= DreamHack Open Cluj-Napoca 2015 =

Counter-Strike: Global Offensive Major championship

- 2015
- The DreamHack Cluj-Napoca 2015 logo

Tournament information
- Sport: Counter-Strike: Global Offensive
- Location: Cluj-Napoca, Romania
- Dates: October 28, 2015–November 1, 2015
- Administrator: Valve; DreamHack
- Tournament format(s): 16 team round-robin group stage Eight team single-elimination playoff
- Venue: Polyvalent Hall
- Teams: 16 teams
- Purse: $250,000 USD

Final positions
- Champions: Team EnVyUs (1st title)
- 1st runners-up: Natus Vincere
- 2nd runners-up: G2 Esports; Ninjas in Pyjamas
- MVP: Kenny "kennyS" Schrub

DreamHack Open Cluj-Napoca 2015 was the seventh Counter-Strike: Global Offensive Major Championship that was held from October 28 – November 1, 2015 at the Sala Polivalentă in Cluj-Napoca, Romania. It was organized by DreamHack with help from Valve and the Professional Gamers League. The tournament had a total prize pool of US$250,000.

Eight teams were featured in the playoffs. Fnatic, G2 Esports, Luminosity Gaming, Natus Vincere, Ninjas in Pyjamas, Team EnVyUs, Team SoloMid, and Virtus.pro – all Legends from the last major – were once again Legends as no Challenger took their spots. Team EnVyUs, which defeated Fnatic and G2 Esports, was the winner of the event, defeating Natus Vincere, which defeated Luminosity Gaming and Ninjas in Pyjamas, in the finals, 2–0. This came after Team EnVyUs placed second at the previous major, including a game in which Fnatic came back from a large deficit in the first game of grand finals.

== Format ==
The top eight teams from ESL One Cologne 2015 ("Legends") received direct invitations to Cluj-Napoca. This was the first Major to fill the other eight Major spots from a single Major qualifier, instead of directly from various regional qualifiers. For the Cluj-Napoca Major cycle, the regional qualifiers sent teams to DreamHack Open Stockholm 2015, where they faced off against the bottom eight teams from Cologne 2015. The top eight teams from DreamHack Open Stockholm 2015 then advanced to the Major as the "Challengers"

Teams were split up into four groups, and all group matches were best-of-ones with the exception of the final decider match. The highest seed would play the lowest seed in each group and the second and third seeds would play against each other. The winner of those two matches would play each other to determine which team moved on to the playoff stage, while the losers of the first round of matches also played. The loser of the lower match was then eliminated from the tournament. With one team advanced and one eliminated, the two remaining teams would play a best-of-three elimination match for the second playoff spot. This format is known as the GSL format, named for the Global StarCraft II League.

The playoffs bracket consisted of eight teams, two from each group. All of these matches were best-of-three, single elimination. Teams advanced in the bracket until a winner was decided.

=== Map Pool ===
The seven-map pool did not change from Cologne 2015. Before each best-of-one match in the group stage, teams alternated banning maps until five maps had been banned. One of the two remaining maps was randomly selected, and the team that that did not get a third ban then selected which side it wanted to start on. In all best-of-three series, each team first banned a map, leaving a five-map pool. Each team then chose a map, with the opposing team selecting which side they wanted to start on for their opponent's map choice. The two map picks were the first two maps in the best-of-three. If the series were to require a third map, the map was randomly selected from the three remaining maps.

Maps

- Cache
- Cobblestone
- Dust II
- Inferno
- Mirage
- Overpass
- Train

== Main Qualifier ==
=== Regional Qualifiers ===
Two teams from the first European qualifier moved on to the major. Eight teams that were eliminated in the said qualifier moved to the second European qualifier. Three teams from that qualifier moved on to the major. Two teams from the North American qualifier moved on to the major and one team from the Asian qualifier moved on to the major.

==== Europe Qualifiers ====
Europe Qualifier #1

Round 1
Team Dignitas	0
k1ck eSports.hu	2
Reason Gaming.dk	2
Los Jefes	0
Copenhagen Wolves	2
EURONICS Gaming	0
PENTA Sports	2
Torpedo Gaming	1
SK Gaming	2
Infinity	0
Dobry&Gaming	2
MIXCAT	1
Space Soldiers	1
London Conspiracy	2
HellRaisers	2
Wizards e-Sports Club	1

Round 2
k1ck eSports.hu	2
Reason Gaming.dk	0
Copenhagen Wolves	2
PENTA Sports	1
SK Gaming	2
Dobry&Gaming	0
London Conspiracy	0
HellRaisers	2

Round 3
k1ck eSports.hu	0
Copenhagen Wolves	2
SK Gaming	0
HellRaisers	2

DH Cluj-Napoca 2015
Copenhagen Wolves	Q
HellRaisers	Q

Europe Qualifier #2

Round 1
SK Gaming	2
NIGHT RAID	0
Torpedo Gaming	1
MIXCAT	2
London Conspiracy	2
x6tence	1
Dobry&Gaming	2
OverGaming	0
PENTA Sports	1
Team LDLC.com Blue	2
Reason Gaming.dk	2
Space Soldiers	0
Team Dignitas	2
AWTR	0
k1ck eSports.hu	2
WorstPlayers	0

Round 2
SK Gaming	0
MIXCAT	2
London Conspiracy	0
Dobry&Gaming	2
Team LDLC.com Blue	0
Reason Gaming.dk	2
Team Dignitas	2
k1ck eSports.hu	0

Round 3
MIXCAT	0
Dobry&Gaming	2
Reason Gaming.dk	0
Team Dignitas	2

DH Cluj-Napoca 2015
Dobry&Gaming	Q
Team Dignitas	Q
3rd Place DHCN Qualifier
MIXCAT	2
Reason Gaming.dk	1

==== North American Qualifier ====
North American Qualifier

Quarterfinals
Team Liquid	2
h00liGaNz	2
3sUP Enterprises	0
compLexity Gaming	2
Mythic	2
Method	1
Games Academy	0
Conquest	2

Semifinals
Team Liquid	2
compLexity Gaming	0
Mythic	2
Conquest	1

Finals
Team Liquid	Q
Mythic	Q

==== Asian Qualifier ====
Asian Qualifier

Quarterfinals
m0nster.kr	0
ExsequoR	2
QeeYou	2
iSg.vA	0
Skyred	2
Team nxl	1
MVP Karnal	1
TyLoo	2

Semifinals
ExsequoR	0
QeeYou	2
Skyred	2
TyLoo	0

Finals
QeeYou	2
Skyred	0

=== Main Qualifier ===
The 16 teams at the major qualifier played at DreamHack Open Stockholm 2015. The bottom eight teams from ESL One Cologne 2015, five teams from two European qualifiers, two teams from the North American qualifier, and one team from the Asian qualifier.

Teams were divided into four groups and the top two from each group made it to the major.

ESL One Cologne 2015 Bottom 8

- Counter Logic Gaming
- Cloud9
- Renegades
- Flipsid3 Tactics
- Vexed Gaming
- Team Immunity
- Titan
- mousesports

Regional Qualifiers

- Copenhagen Wolves (Europe Qualifier 1)
- HellRaisers (Europe Qualifier 1)
- Lounge Gaming (Note: Lounge Gaming signed the entire Dobry&Gaming lineup.) (Europe Qualifier 2)
- Team Dignitas (Europe Qualifier 2)
- Team ROCCAT (Note: MIXCAT signed with Team ROCCAT.) (Europe Qualifier 2)
- Team Liquid (North America Qualifier)
- Winterfox (Note: Mythic was signed by Winterfox.) (North America Qualifier)
- Skyred (Note: The Asia Qualifier champion, QeeYou, had passport issues and could not attend. Skyred was the runner-up of the qualifier and took its place at the main qualifier.) (Asia Qualifier)

=== DreamHack Open Stockholm 2015 ===
The main qualifier took place at DreamHack Open Stockholm 2015. Group A

Pos	Team	W	L	RF	RA	RD	Pts
1	Cloud9	2	0	64	40	+24	6
2	Team Dignitas	2	1	93	89	+4	6
3	Team Immunity	1	2	89	97	−8	3
4	Team ROCCAT	0	2	44	64	−20	0

Group A Results
Cloud9	2	0	Team ROCCAT
Team Immunity	0	2	Team Dignitas
Cloud9	2	0	Team Dignitas
Team Immunity	2	0	Team ROCCAT
Team Dignitas	2	1	Team Immunity

Group B

Pos	Team	W	L	RF	RA	RD	Pts
1	Titan	2	0	72	51	+21	6
2	Vexed Gaming	2	1	89	98	−9	6
3	HellRaisers	1	2	108	97	+11	3
4	Skyred	0	2	41	64	−23	0

Group B Results
Titan	2	0	Skyred
Vexed Gaming	0	2	HellRaisers
Titan	2	1	HellRaisers
Vexed Gaming	2	0	Skyred
HellRaisers	1	2	Vexed Gaming

Group C

Pos	Team	W	L	RF	RA	RD	Pts
1	mousesports	2	0	67	47	+20	6
2	Team Liquid	2	1	97	77	+20	6
3	Renegades	1	2	77	101	−24	3
4	Winterfox	0	2	51	67	−16	0

Group C Results
mousesports	2	0	Winterfox
Renegades	1	2	Team Liquid
mousesports	2	0	Team Liquid
Renegades	2	0	Winterfox
Team Liquid	2	0	Renegades

Group D

Pos	Team	W	L	RF	RA	RD	Pts
1	Counter Logic Gaming	2	0	81	66	+15	6
2	FlipSid3 Tactics	2	1	90	68	+22	6
3	Copenhagen Wolves	1	2	82	95	−13	3
4	Lounge Gaming	0	2	71	95	−24	0

Group D Results
FlipSid3 Tactics	2	0	Copenhagen Wolves
Counter Logic Gaming	2	1	Lounge Gaming
FlipSid3 Tactics	0	2	Counter Logic Gaming
Copenhagen Wolves	2	1	Lounge Gaming
FlipSid3 Tactics	2	0	Copenhagen Wolves

== Broadcast talent ==
Hosts

- Paul "ReDeYe" Chaloner
- Richard Lewis

Interviewers

- Pala "Mantrousse" Gilroy Sen
- Scott "SirScoots" Smith

Analysts

- Robin "Fifflaren" Johansson
- Joona "natu" Leppänen
- Jason "moses" O'Toole
- Duncan "Thorin " Shields

Commentators

- James Bardolph
- Anders Blume
- Henry "HenryG" Greer
- Daniel "ddk" Kapadia
- Auguste "Semmler" Massonnat
- Matthew "Sadokist" Trivett

=== Broadcasts ===
All streams were broadcast on Twitch in various languages.

- DreamHackCS
- 99Damage
- BiDa
- cadiaN
- cnon3
- DreamHackCS Spain
- Excello
- GamermagTV
- Gameshow
- GamingLive
- GEC TV
- Hungarian Esport TV
- HuntingDuck
- IzakOOO
- striimIT
- Subzidite
- svtplay

== Teams ==
Legends

- Fnatic
- Team EnVyUs
- Team SoloMid
- Virtus.pro
- G2 Esports (Note: Team Kinguin partnered with G2 Esports and the players played under the G2 name.)
- Ninjas in Pyjamas
- Luminosity Gaming
- Natus Vincere

Qualifiers

- Counter Logic Gaming
- mousesports
- Cloud9
- Team Dignitas
- Flipsid3 Tactics
- Team Liquid
- Vexed Gaming (Note: The roster of Team eBettle played under the name Vexed Gaming due to the organization wanting to distance its eSports and betting operations.)
- Titan

=== Pre-Major Ranking ===
The HLTV.org October 26, 2015 ranking of teams, displayed below, was the final ranking released before the Major.

HLTV.org Pre-Major Ranking

World Ranking
Place	Team	Points	Move^{†}
1	Team SoloMid	892	Steady
2	Fnatic	888	Steady
3	Virtus.pro	805	Steady
4	Team EnVyUs	778	Steady
5	Ninjas in Pyjamas	440	Steady
6	Natus Vincere	432	Steady
7	Cloud9	279	Steady
8	Team Dignitas	214	Steady
9	G2 Esports	209	Steady
10	Counter Logic Gaming	208	Steady
11	Team Liquid	207	▲1
12	Titan	203	▲1
13	mousesports	197	▼2
14	Flipsid3 Tactics	183	Steady
15	Luminosity Gaming	175	Steady
18	Vexed Gaming	102	Steady

^{†}Change since October 19, 2015 ranking

== Group stage ==
=== Group A ===
Pos	Team	W	L	RF	RA	RD	Pts
1	Luminosity Gaming	2	0	32	24	+8	6
2	Fnatic	2	1	61	44	+17	6
3	Cloud9	1	2	45	61	−16	3
4	Vexed Gaming	0	2	23	32	−9	0

Group A Matches
Fnatic	1	0	Vexed Gaming
Luminosity Gaming	1	0	Cloud9
Cloud9	1	0	Vexed Gaming
Fnatic	0	1	Luminosity Gaming
Fnatic	2	0	Cloud9

Group A Scores

Group A Scores
Team	Score	Map	Score	Team
Fnatic	16	Cobblestone	10	Vexed Gaming
Luminosity Gaming	16	Dust II	11	Cloud9
Cloud9	16	Cobblestone	13	Vexed Gaming
Fnatic	13	Inferno	16	Luminosity Gaming
Fnatic	16	Dust II	6	Cloud9
Fnatic	16	Overpass	12	Cloud9
Fnatic	–	Cache	–	Cloud9

=== Group B ===
Pos	Team	W	L	RF	RA	RD	Pts
1	Team SoloMid	2	0	32	12	+20	6
2	G2 Esports	2	1	69	61	+8	6
3	mousesports	1	2	61	71	−10	3
4	FlipSid3 Tactics	0	2	14	32	−18	0

Group B Matches
Team SoloMid	1	0	FlipSid3 Tactics
G2 Esports	1	0	mousesports
mousesports	1	0	FlipSid3 Tactics
Team SoloMid	1	0	G2 Esports
G2 Esports	2	1	mousesports

Group B Scores

Group B Scores
Team	Score	Map	Score	Team
Team SoloMid	16	Cache	6	FlipSid3 Tactics
G2 Esports	16	Inferno	8	mousesports
mousesports	16	Overpass	8	FlipSid3 Tactics
Team SoloMid	16	Dust II	6	G2 Esports
G2 Esports	19	Mirage	16	mousesports
G2 Esports	12	Inferno	16	mousesports
G2 Esports	16	Cache	5	mousesports

=== Group C ===
Pos	Team	W	L	RF	RA	RD	Pts
1	Virtus.pro	2	0	35	22	+13	6
2	Ninjas in Pyjamas	2	1	61	42	+19	6
3	Titan	1	2	38	61	−23	3
4	Team Liquid	0	2	26	35	−9	0

Group C Matches
Virtus.pro	1	0	Team Liquid
Ninjas in Pyjamas	0	1	Titan
Ninjas in Pyjamas	1	0	Team Liquid
Virtus.pro	1	0	Titan
Titan	0	2	Ninjas in Pyjamas

Group C Scores

Group C Scores
Team	Score	Map	Score	Team
Virtus.pro	19	Cobblestone	15	Team Liquid
Ninjas in Pyjamas	13	Cobblestone	16	Titan
Ninjas in Pyjamas	16	Mirage	11	Team Liquid
Virtus.pro	16	Train	7	Titan
Titan	14	Cache	16	Ninjas in Pyjamas
Titan	1	Dust II	16	Ninjas in Pyjamas
Titan	–	Overpass	–	Ninjas in Pyjamas

=== Group D ===
Pos	Team	W	L	RF	RA	RD	Pts
1	Team EnVyUs	2	0	32	15	+17	6
2	Natus Vincere	2	1	67	61	+6	6
3	Counter Logic Gaming	1	2	61	72	−11	3
4	Team Dignitas	0	2	20	32	−12	0

Group D Matches
Team EnVyUs	1	0	Team Dignitas
Natus Vincere	1	0	Counter Logic Gaming
Counter Logic Gaming	1	0	Team Dignitas
Team EnVyUs	1	0	Natus Vincere
Natus Vincere	2	1	Counter Logic Gaming

Group D Scores

Group D Scores
Team	Score	Map	Score	Team
Team EnVyUs	16	Cobblestone	6	Team Dignitas
Natus Vincere	16	Cobblestone	12	Counter Logic Gaming
Counter Logic Gaming	16	Cobblestone	14	Team Dignitas
Team EnVyUs	16	Mirage	9	Natus Vincere
Natus Vincere	16	Train	9	Counter Logic Gaming
Natus Vincere	10	Cobblestone	16	Counter Logic Gaming
Natus Vincere	16	Inferno	8	Counter Logic Gaming

== Playoffs ==
Quarterfinals
D1	Team EnVyUs	2
A2	Fnatic	1
C1	Virtus.pro	0
B2	G2 Esports	2
B1	Team SoloMid	0
C2	Ninjas in Pyjamas	2
A1	Luminosity Gaming	0
D2	Natus Vincere	2

Semifinals
D1	Team EnVyUs	2
B2	G2 Esports	1
C2	Ninjas in Pyjamas	0
D2	Natus Vincere	2

Finals
D1	Team EnVyUs	2
D2	Natus Vincere	0

=== Quarterfinals ===
==== Team EnVyUs vs. Fnatic ====
Casters: Anders Blume & Semmler

Team EnVyUs vs. Fnatic
Team	Score	Map	Score	Team
Team EnVyUs	9	Mirage	16	Fnatic
Team EnVyUs	16	Cobblestone	9	Fnatic
Team EnVyUs	16	Cache	2	Fnatic

==== Virtus.pro vs. G2 Esports ====
Casters: James Bardolph & ddk

Virtus.pro vs. G2 Esports
Team	Score	Map	Score	Team
Virtus.pro	10	Cache	16	G2 Esports
Virtus.pro	17	Train	19	G2 Esports
Virtus.pro	–	Mirage	–	G2 Esports

==== Team SoloMid vs. Ninjas in Pyjamas ====
Casters: Anders Blume & moses

Team SoloMid vs. Ninjas in Pyjamas
Team	Score	Map	Score	Team
Team SoloMid	10	Train	16	Ninjas in Pyjamas
Team SoloMid	8	Dust II	16	Ninjas in Pyjamas
Team SoloMid	–	Inferno	–	Ninjas in Pyjamas

==== Luminosity Gaming vs. Natus Vincere ====
Casters: Sadokist & HenryG

Luminosity Gaming vs. Natus Vincere
Team	Score	Map	Score	Team
Luminosity Gaming	14	Dust II	16	Natus Vincere
Luminosity Gaming	13	Overpass	16	Natus Vincere
Luminosity Gaming	–	Inferno	–	Natus Vincere

=== Semifinals ===
==== Team EnVyUs vs. G2 Esports ====
Casters: James Bardolph & ddk

Team EnVyUs vs. G2 Esports
Team	Score	Map	Score	Team
Team EnVyUs	10	Dust II	16	G2 Esports
Team EnVyUs	25	Inferno	21	G2 Esports
Team EnVyUs	16	Cache	7	G2 Esports

==== Ninjas in Pyjamas vs. Natus Vincere ====
Casters: Sadokist & HenryG

Ninjas in Pyjamas vs. Natus Vincere
Team	Score	Map	Score	Team
Ninjas in Pyjamas	3	Train	16	Natus Vincere
Ninjas in Pyjamas	6	Dust II	16	Natus Vincere
Ninjas in Pyjamas	–	Inferno	–	Natus Vincere

=== Finals ===
Casters: Anders Blume & Semmler

Team EnVyUs won its first title. kennyS and apEX had their first major title and NBK-, kioShiMa, and Happy won their second title, their first being with Team LDLC.com at DreamHack Winter 2014.

Team EnVyUs vs. Natus Vincere
Team	Score	Map	Score	Team
Team EnVyUs	16	Train	14	Natus Vincere
Team EnVyUs	16	Cobblestone	5	Natus Vincere
Team EnVyUs	–	Dust II	–	Natus Vincere

== Final standings ==
Place	Team	Prize Money	Seed	Roster	Coach
1st	Team EnVyUs	$100,000	MLG Columbus 2016	kioShiMa, Happy, kennyS, NBK, apEX	Next
2nd	Natus Vincere	$50,000	MLG Columbus 2016	Edward, Zeus, seized, flamie, GuardiaN	starix
3rd–4th	G2 Esports	$22,000	MLG Columbus 2016	Maikelele, fox, dennis, jkaem, rain	zbM
3rd–4th	Ninjas in Pyjamas	$22,000	MLG Columbus 2016	f0rest, GeT RiGhT, Xizt, friberg, allu	HeatoN
5–8th	Fnatic	$10,000	MLG Columbus 2016	JW, flusha, pronax, olofmeister, KRiMZ	vuggo
5–8th	Virtus.pro	$10,000	MLG Columbus 2016	TaZ, NEO, pashaBiceps, byali, Snax	kuben
5–8th	Team SoloMid	$10,000	MLG Columbus 2016	karrigan, dev1ce, cajunb, dupreeh, Xyp9x	3k2
5–8th	Luminosity Gaming	$10,000	MLG Columbus 2016	FalleN, fer, steel, coldzera, boltz	nak
9–12th	Cloud9	$2,000	MLG Columbus 2016 Qualifier	Skadoodle, sgares, fREAKAZOiD, n0thing, shroud	stunna
9–12th	mousesports	$2,000	MLG Columbus 2016 Qualifier	gob b, nex, denis, chrisj, NiKo	PsYcHo
9–12th	Titan	$2,000	MLG Columbus 2016 Qualifier	RpK, shox, SmithZz, Ex6TenZ, ScreaM	NiaK
9–12th	Counter Logic Gaming	$2,000	MLG Columbus 2016 Qualifier	hazed, reltuC, tarik, jdm64, FNS	–
13–16th	Vexed Gaming	$2,000	MLG Columbus 2016 Qualifier	peet, GruBy, Hyper, rallen, Furlan	–
13–16th	FlipSid3 Tactics	$2,000	MLG Columbus 2016 Qualifier	B1ad3, bondik, markeloff, WorldEdit, DavCost	Johnta
13–16th	Team Liquid	$2,000	MLG Columbus 2016 Qualifier	Hiko, adreN, EliGE, FugLy, nitr0	GBJame^s
13–16th	Team Dignitas	$2,000	MLG Columbus 2016 Qualifier	MSL, Pimp, aizy, Kjaerbye, tenzki	zonic

=== Post-Major Ranking ===
The HLTV.org November 3, 2015 rankings of teams in the major is displayed below. The ranking was the first one released after the major.

HLTV.org Post-Major Ranking

World Ranking
Place	Team	Points	Move^{†}
1	Team EnVyUs	949	▲3
2	Team SoloMid	821	▼1
3	Fnatic	785	▼1
4	Virtus.pro	722	▼1
5	Natus Vincere	598	▲1
6	Ninjas in Pyjamas	491	▼1
7	G2 Esports	308	▲2
8	Cloud9	273	▼1
9	Luminosity Gaming	222	▲6
10	Counter Logic Gaming	220	Steady
11	Titan	201	▲1
12	Team Dignitas	199	▼4
13	mousesports	198	Steady
14	Team Liquid	196	▼3
15	Flipsid3 Tactics	178	▼1
18	Vexed Gaming	90	Steady

^{†}Change since October 26, 2015 ranking
