= ESL One Katowice 2015 =

Esports tournament

- 2015
- The ESL One Katowice 2015 logo

Tournament information
- Sport: Counter-Strike: Global Offensive
- Location: Katowice, Silesian Voivodeship, Poland
- Dates: March 12, 2015–March 15, 2015
- Administrator: Valve; ESL
- Tournament format(s): 16 team GSL group stage Eight team single-elimination playoff
- Venue: Spodek Arena
- Teams: 16 teams
- Purse: US$250,000

Final positions
- Champions: Fnatic (2nd title)
- 1st runners-up: Ninjas in Pyjamas
- 2nd runners-up: Team EnVyUs; Virtus.pro
- MVP: Olof "olofmeister" Kajbjer

ESL One Katowice 2015, also known as Katowice 2015, was the fifth Counter-Strike: Global Offensive Major Championship, held from March 12 to March 15, 2015, at the Spodek Arena in Katowice, Poland. It was the first CS:GO Major of 2015. It was organized by Electronic Sports League with sponsorship from Valve. The tournament had a total prize pool of US$250,000. The defending champion was Team EnVyUs, whose roster had won the previous Major as Team LDLC.com.

Eight teams advanced from the group stage to a playoff bracket, earning "Legends" status and automatic qualification to the following Major. Fnatic, Team EnVyUs, Ninjas in Pyjamas, Virtus.pro, Natus Vincere, PENTA Sports, and Team SoloMid were returning Legends from the previous Major. Keyd Stars was the only new Legends and became the first South American team to play in a Major and qualify to the playoff bracket. HellRaisers lost its Legends status after losing to Counter Logic Gaming and Keyd Stars in the group stage. The grand finals featured two Swedish teams. Fnatic defeated PENTA Sports and Virtus.pro in the bracket while Ninjas in Pyjamas defeated Team SoloMid and Team EnVyUs on their way to the grand finals. Fnatic then beat Ninjas in Pyjamas 2–1 in the finals. Fnatic became the first team to win a second Major, and remained the only team to do so until MIBR (attending Katowice 2015 as Keyd Stars) won MLG Columbus 2016 and ESL One Cologne 2016.

== Format ==
The top eight teams from DreamHack Winter 2014 ("Legends") received direct invitations to Katowice. In addition, eight other teams (the "Challengers") emerged from offline qualifiers.

Teams were split up into four groups, and all group matches were best-of-ones. The highest seed would play the lowest seed in each group and the second and third seeds would play against each other. The winner of those two matches would play each other to determine which team moved on to the playoff stage, while the losers of the first round of matches also played. The loser of the lower match was then eliminated from the tournament. With one team advanced and one eliminated, the two remaining teams would play an elimination match for the second playoff spot. This format is known as the GSL format, named for the Global StarCraft II League.

The playoffs bracket consisted of eight teams, two from each group. All of these matches were best-of-three, single elimination. Teams advanced in the bracket until a winner was decided.

=== Map Pool ===
The seven-map pool did not change from DreamHack Winter 2014. Before each match in the group stage, both teams banned two maps. The map for the match was then randomly selected from the remaining three maps. In the playoffs, each team first banned one map, then chose one map. The two chosen maps were the first two maps in the best-of-three. If the series were to require a third map, the map was randomly selected from the three remaining maps.

Maps

- Cache
- Cobblestone
- Dust II
- Inferno
- Mirage
- Nuke
- Overpass

== Main qualifier ==
The 16 teams at the main qualifier were separated into two groups of 8. The teams played in a double-elimination, best of one bracket. Four teams from each group, two from the winner's bracket and two from the loser's bracket, advanced to the Major.

Invited (Note: Only seven teams received direct invites because four of the five players from Team iBUYPOWER were banned by Valve for their role in the North American match fixing scandal. The bans were officially made permanent on January 5, 2016.)

- Cloud9
- Gamers2 (Note: Team WinneR was found to be guilty of match fixing, so the team was disqualified. 3DMAX took the vacant spot. Players of ESC Gaming were also accused of match fixing, but they were cleared of any wrongdoing.)
- KaBuM.TD
- Team Dignitas
- Team Liquid
- Titan
- Vox Eminor

Regional Qualifiers

- Copenhagen Wolves (Europe Qualifier 1)
- mousesports (Europe Qualifier 1)
- Flipsid3 Tactics (Europe Qualifier 2)
- 3DMAX^{2} (Europe Qualifier 2)
- LGB eSports (Europe Qualifier 1)
- PiTER (CIS Qualifier)
- INSHOCK (Poland Qualifier)
- Counter Logic Gaming (NA Qualifier)
- ESC Gaming (Note: The Polish roster of ESC Gaming was picked up by Gamers2. ESC Gaming would go on to pick up a Danish roster.) (EU Last Chance)

=== Group A ===
Upper round 1
Titan	28
PiTER	24
Counter Logic Gaming	16
Gamers2	14
Team Liquid	14
FlipSid3 Tactics	16
Copenhagen Wolves	8
LGB eSports	16
Lower round 1
PiTER	19
Gamers2	17
Team Liquid	10
CPH Wolves	16

Upper round 2
Titan	14
Counter Logic Gaming	16
FlipSid3 Tactics	11
LGB eSports	16
Lower round 2
FlipSid3 Tactics	16
PiTER	3
Titan	16
Copenhagen Wolves	4

Qualified
Counter Logic Gaming
LGB eSports
Qualified
FlipSid3 Tactics
Titan

=== Group B ===
Upper round 1
Cloud9	16
INSHOCK	2
mousesports	16
KaBuM.TD	10
3DMAX	11
Vox Eminor	16
ESC Gaming	11
Team Dignitas	16
Lower round 1
INSHOCK	11
KaBuM.TD	16
3DMAX	16
ESC Gaming	8

Upper round 2
Cloud9	16
mousesports	14
Vox Eminor	16
Team Dignitas	13
Lower round 2
Team Dignitas	3
KaBuM.TD	16
mousesports	8
3DMAX	16

Qualified
Cloud9
Vox Eminor
Qualified
KaBuM.TD
3DMAX

== Broadcast Talent ==
Hosts

- Sean Charles
- Alex "Machine" Richardson

Analysts

- Casper "cadiaN" Møller
- Spencer "Hiko" Martin

Commentators

- Leigh "Deman" Smith
- Anders Blume
- Lauren "Pansy" Scott
- Stuart "TosspoT" Saw

Observers

- Joshua "steel" Nissan
- Yanko "YNk" Paunović

== Teams ==
Legends

- Team SoloMid (Note: The roster of Team Dignitas was acquired by Team SoloMid.)
- Fnatic
- Hellraisers
- Ninjas in Pyjamas
- Team EnVyUs (Note: Team EnVyUs acquired the full roster of Team LDLC.com.)
- PENTA Sports
- Virtus.pro
- Natus Vincere

Main qualifier teams

- Counter Logic Gaming
- LBG eSports
- Cloud9
- Vox Eminor
- Flipsid3 Tactics
- Keyd Stars
- 3DMAX
- Titan

== Group stage ==
=== Group A ===
Pos	Team	W	L	RF	RA	RD	Pts
1	Fnatic	2	0	32	10	+22	6
2	Natus Vincere	2	1	39	21	+18	6
3	Vox Eminor	1	2	22	34	−12	3
4	FlipSid3 Tactics	0	2	4	32	−28	0

Group A matches
Team	Score	Map	Score	Team
Natus Vincere	16	Mirage	2	FlipSid3 Tactics
Fnatic	16	Inferno	3	Vox Eminor
FlipSid3 Tactics	2	Cache	16	Vox Eminor
Natus Vincere	7	Cobblestone	16	Fnatic
Natus Vincere	16	Inferno	3	Vox Eminor

=== Group B ===
Pos	Team	W	L	RF	RA	RD	Pts
1	Team EnVyUs	2	0	32	22	+10	6
2	PENTA Sports	2	1	35	32	+3	6
3	LGB eSports	1	2	36	35	+1	3
4	Titan	0	2	18	32	−14	0

Group B matches
Team	Score	Map	Score	Team
Team EnVyUs	16	Cobblestone	14	Titan
PENTA Sports	3	Dust II	16	LGB eSports
Team EnVyUs	16	Cache	8	LGB eSports
PENTA Sports	16	Cache	4	Titan
LGB eSports	12	Dust II	16	PENTA Sports

=== Group C ===
Pos	Team	W	L	RF	RA	RD	Pts
1	Ninjas in Pyjamas	2	0	32	16	+16	6
2	Keyd Stars	2	1	41	36	+5	6
3	Counter Logic Gaming	1	2	31	46	−15	3
4	HellRaisers	0	2	26	32	−6	0

Group C matches
Team	Score	Map	Score	Team
Ninjas in Pyjamas	16	Inferno	9	Keyd Stars
HellRaisers	14	Nuke	16	Counter Logic Gaming
Ninjas in Pyjamas	16	Mirage	7	Counter Logic Gaming
HellRaisers	12	Inferno	16	Keyd Stars
Counter Logic Gaming	8	Dust II	16	Keyd Stars

=== Group D ===
Pos	Team	W	L	RF	RA	RD	Pts
1	Virtus.pro	2	0	32	16	+16	6
2	Team SoloMid	2	1	46	34	+12	6
3	Cloud9	1	2	35	46	−11	3
4	3DMAX	0	2	15	32	−17	0

Group D matches
Team	Score	Map	Score	Team
Virtus.pro	16	Overpass	5	3DMAX
Team SoloMid	14	Nuke	16	Cloud9
Virtus.pro	16	Inferno	11	Cloud9
Team SoloMid	16	Nuke	10	3DMAX
Cloud9	8	Overpass	16	Team SoloMid

== Playoffs ==
The winner of each group played the runner-up of a different group for each quarterfinals match.

=== Bracket ===
Quarterfinals
A1	Fnatic	2
B2	PENTA Sports	0
D1	Virtus.pro	2
C2	Keyd Stars	1
B1	Team EnVyUs	2
A2	Natus Vincere	1
C1	Ninjas in Pyjamas	2
D2	Team SoloMid	1

Semifinals
A1	Fnatic	2
D1	Virtus.pro	0
B1	Team EnVyUs	0
C1	Ninjas in Pyjamas	2

Finals
A1	Fnatic	2
C1	Ninjas in Pyjamas	1

=== Quarterfinals ===
==== Fnatic vs. PENTA Sports ====
Casters: Deman & SPUNJ

Fnatic vs. PENTA Sports Scores
Team	Score	Map	Score	Team
Fnatic	16	Inferno	8	PENTA Sports
Fnatic	16	Cache	7	PENTA Sports
Fnatic	–	Overpass	–	PENTA Sports

==== Virtus.pro vs. Keyd Stars ====
Casters: TosspoT & seang@res

Virtus.pro vs. Keyd Stars Scores
Team	Score	Map	Score	Team
Virtus.pro	16	Mirage	4	Keyd Stars
Virtus.pro	17	Overpass	19	Keyd Stars
Virtus.pro	16	Nuke	1	Keyd Stars

==== Team EnVyUs vs. Natus Vincere ====
Casters: Pansy & natu

Team EnVyUs vs. Natus Vincere Scores
Team	Score	Map	Score	Team
Team EnVyUs	16	Cache	12	Natus Vincere
Team EnVyUs	14	Dust II	16	Natus Vincere
Team EnVyUs	16	Mirage	3	Natus Vincere

==== Ninjas in Pyjamas vs. Team SoloMid ====
Casters: Anders Blume & natu

Ninjas in Pyjamas vs. Team SoloMid Scores
Team	Score	Map	Score	Team
Ninjas in Pyjamas	16	Dust II	8	Team SoloMid
Ninjas in Pyjamas	4	Inferno	16	Team SoloMid
Ninjas in Pyjamas	16	Nuke	12	Team SoloMid

=== Semifinals ===
==== Fnatic vs. Virtus.pro ====
Casters: Anders Blume & SEMPHIS

Fnatic vs. Virtus.pro Scores
Team	Score	Map	Score	Team
Fnatic	19	Cobblestone	17	Virtus.pro
Fnatic	16	Mirage	8	Virtus.pro
Fnatic	–	Overpass	–	Virtus.pro

==== Team EnVyUs vs. Ninjas in Pyjamas ====
Casters: Deman & seang@res

Team EnVyUs vs. Ninjas in Pyjamas Scores
Team	Score	Map	Score	Team
Team EnVyUs	9	Cache	16	Ninjas in Pyjamas
Team EnVyUs	10	Dust II	16	Ninjas in Pyjamas
Team EnVyUs	–	Mirage	–	Ninjas in Pyjamas

=== Finals ===
Both teams in the final had at one point been considered the best team in the world, and the head-to-head was split right down the middle, with Fnatic having a 16–15 lead.

Casters: Anders Blume, TossopT, & seang@res

Fnatic vs. Ninjas in Pyjamas Scores
Team	Score	Map	Score	Team
Fnatic	16	Dust II	14	Ninjas in Pyjamas
Fnatic	10	Cache	16	Ninjas in Pyjamas
Fnatic	16	Inferno	13	Ninjas in Pyjamas

== Final standings ==
Place	Team	Prize Money	Seed for ESL One Cologne 2015	Roster	Coach
1st	Fnatic	US$100,000	Legends status	JW, flusha, pronax, olofmeister, KRiMZ	Devilwalk
2nd	Ninjas in Pyjamas	US$50,000	Legends status	f0rest, GeT RiGhT, Xizt, friberg, allu	pita
3rd–4th	Team EnVyUs	US$22,000	Legends status	kioShiMa, Happy, SmithZz, NBK, shox	–
3rd–4th	Virtus.pro	US$22,000	Legends status	TaZ, NEO, pashaBiceps, byali, Snax	kuben
5–8th	Keyd Stars	US$10,000	Legends status	FalleN, fer, steel, zqk, boltz	–
5–8th	Natus Vincere	US$10,000	Legends status	Edward, Zeus, starix, seized, GuardiaN	Ugin
5–8th	Team SoloMid	US$10,000	Legends status	karrigan, dev1ce, cajunb, dupreeh, Xyp9x	3k2
5–8th	PENTA Sports	US$10,000	Legends status	nex, Spidii, denis, kRYSTAL, Troubley	alexRr
9–12th	Vox Eminor	US$2,000	–	SPUNJ, Havoc, jks, AZR, topguN	–
9–12th	LGB eSports	US$2,000	–	RUBINO, rain, jkaem, zEVES, Polly	–
9–12th	Cloud9	US$2,000	–	ShahZam, sgares, n0thing, shroud, Semphis	–
9–12th	Counter Logic Gaming	US$2,000	–	hazed, reltuC, tarik, ptr, FNS	–
13–16th	Titan	US$2,000	–	kennyS, Rpk, apEX, Maniac, Ex6TenZ	–
13–16th	FlipSid3 Tactics	US$2,000	–	B1ad3, bondik, markeloff, WorldEdit, DavCost	–
13–16th	HellRaisers	US$2,000	–	ANGE1, kucher, flamie, Dosia, AdreN	–
13–16th	3DMAX	US$2,000	–	diSTURBED, natu, KHRN, stonde, xartE	–
