= ESL One Cologne 2014 =

Esports tournament

- 2014
- The ESL One Cologne 2014 logo

Tournament information
- Sport: Counter-Strike: Global Offensive
- Location: Cologne, North Rhine-Westphalia, Germany
- Dates: August 14, 2014–August 17, 2014
- Administrator: Valve; ESL
- Tournament format(s): 16 team round-robin group stage Eight team single-elimination playoff
- Host: Gamescom 2014
- Venue: Cologne Exhibition Centre
- Teams: 16 teams
- Purse: US$250,000

Final positions
- Champions: Ninjas in Pyjamas (1st title)
- 1st runners-up: Fnatic
- 2nd runners-up: Team LDLC.com; Team Dignitas
- MVP: Adam "friberg" Friberg

Electronic Sports League One Cologne 2014, also known as ESL One Cologne 2014, was the third Counter-Strike: Global Offensive Major Championship. The tournament was held during Gamescom 2014 from August 14–17, 2014 at the Cologne Exhibition Centre in Cologne, Germany. It was the second CS:GO Major of 2014. It was organized by Electronic Sports League with sponsorship from Valve. The tournament had a total prize pool of US$250,000.

Ninjas in Pyjamas won the event by beating Fnatic 2–1 in the finals. The tournament was livestreamed on the official ESL Twitch channel. Over 400,000 concurrent viewers watched the grand finals, while 2,950,600 total unique viewers watched the event across four days.

== Format ==
The top seven teams from EMS One Katowice 2014 qualified as Legends. LGB eSports would have had a Legends spot as the eighth finalist from Katowice 2014, but disbanded before Cologne 2014. Six teams from Europe, one team from North America, one team from the Oceanic region, and one team from India played online qualifiers in order to play in the tournament

Teams were split into four seeded groups, and all group matches were best-of-one. In the first round of matches, the highest and lowest seeds faced each other, and the second and third seeds played each other. The winner of those two matches then played to determine the first team to move on to the playoff stage, while the losers played to eliminate one team from the tournament. With one team advanced and one eliminated, the final two teams faced off to decide the remaining playoff spot. This format is known as the GSL format, named for the Global StarCraft II League.

The playoff bracket consisted of eight teams, two from each group. All of these matches were single elimination, best-of-three. Teams advanced in the bracket until a winner was decided.

=== Map Pool ===
There were seven maps to choose from, two more than the previous Major. Train was removed for the tournament, while Cache, Overpass, and Cobblestone were added. Overpass was released by Valve only a month before the tournament, and the decision to add a new map on such short notice before a Major caused some controversy.

Before each match in the group stage, both teams banned two maps. The map for the match was then randomly selected from the remaining three maps. In the playoffs, each team first banned one map, then chose one map. The two chosen maps were the first two maps in the best-of-three. If the series were to require a third map, the map was randomly selected from the three remaining maps.

Maps

- Cache
- Cobblestone
- Dust II
- Inferno
- Mirage
- Nuke
- Overpass

== Qualifiers ==
=== European Qualifier ===
There were 16 teams in the main European qualifier. Four teams from each regional qualifier – Open, North, Southeast, and Southwest – were in the tournament. The tournament was a best of three, double-elimination bracket, with six teams qualifying to the Major.

Winner's Bracket

Round 1
Natus Vincere	2
USSR Team	0
London Conspiracy	2
k1ck eSports Club	1
mousesports	0
dAT Team	2
ESC Gaming	1
ESG!	2
Epsilon eSports	2
mTw	0
unu.Ain	0
Copenhagen Wolves	2
ENCPOE	2
Planetkey Dynamics	0
tomtebloss	0
Titan	2

Round 2
Natus Vincere	1
London Conspiracy	2
dAT Team	2
ESG!	1
Epsilon eSports	2
Copenhagen Wolves	1
ENCORE	0
Titan	2

Qualified
London Conspiracy	Q
dAT Team	Q
Epsilon eSports	Q
Titan	Q

Cologne 2014
Cologne 2014	→
Cologne 2014	→

Loser's Bracket

Quarterfinals
ENCORE	2
k1ck eSports Club	0
Copenhagen Wolves	2
mousesports	0
ESG!	2
unu.Ain	1
Natus Vincere	2
Planetkey Dynamics	0

Semifinals
ENCORE	0
Copenhagen Wolves	2
ESG!	1
Natus Vincere	2

Finals
Copenhagen Wolves	Q
Natus Vincere	Q

=== North American Qualifier ===
This was a 16 team, single elimination bracket with just one team qualifying for the Major.

NA Qualifier Bracket

Round of 16
Team iBUYPOWER	→
BYE
Anonymous 5	0
devastation	1
Team JustUs	0
Defiant Ghosts	1
xero error gaming	0
tNt	1
LunatiK eSports	1
fujiboyz	0
Exertus eSports	1
Mobility Gaming	0
Armata Gaming	0
Adaptation	1
BYE
Flaming Rainbows	→

Quarterfinals
Team iBUYPOWER	2
devastation	0
Defiant Ghosts	0
tNt	2
LunatiK eSports	2
Exertus eSports	0
Adaptation	0
Flaming Rainbows	2

Semifinals
Team iBUYPOWER	2
tNt	0
LunatiK eSports	2
Flaming Rainbows	0

Cologne 2014
Team iBUYPOWER	2
LunatiK eSports	0

=== Oceanic Qualifier ===
This was an 8 team, single elimination bracket with just one team qualifying for the Major.

Oceania Qualifier Bracket

Quarterfinals
Vox Eminor	2
Athletico Esports	0
Fallen	2
Qlimax Crew	0
Team Immunity	2
Control e-Sports	1
auRa eSports	0
Avant Garde	2

Semifinals
Vox Eminor	2
Fallen	0
Team Immunity	2
Avant Garde	1

Finals
Vox Eminor	2
Team Immunity	0

=== Indian Qualifier ===
LGB eSports, which placed third at the previous Major, disbanded, so only seven Legends remained. The tournament organizers decided to fill up the remaining spot with a team from India. This qualifier had 8 teams. The teams played in a robin round and the top four teams played in a double elimination bracket.

Indian Qualifier Grand Final

Cologne 2014
Team Wolf	2
Virtual Impact	0

== Broadcast Talent ==
Hosts

- Paul "ReDeYe" Chaloner
- Scott "SirScoots" Smith

Analyst

- Richard Lewis

Commentators

- Anders Blume
- Auguste "Semmler" Massonnat
- Joshua "steel" Nissan
- Stuart "TosspoT" Saw
- Lauren "Pansy" Scott

== Teams ==
Legends

- Cloud9
- Fnatic
- Hellraisers
- Ninjas in Pyjamas
- Team Dignitas
- Team LDLC.com
- Virtus.pro

Qualifiers

- Copenhagen Wolves
- dAt Team (Note: One of the players on dAT Team, Egor "flamie" Vasilyev, was alleged to have cheated in a qualifier by using an account that may not have been his. Ultimately he was allowed to compete.)
- Epsilon eSports
- London Conspiracy
- Natus Vincere
- Team iBUYPOWER
- Team Wolf
- Titan
- Vox Eminor

== Group stage ==
=== Group A ===
Pos	Team	W	L	RF	RA	RD	Pts
1	Epsilon eSports	2	0	32	7	+25	6
2	Ninjas in Pyjamas	2	1	38	34	+4	6
3	HellRaisers	1	2	26	33	−7	3
4	Team Wolf	0	2	11	32	−21	0

Group A matches
Team	Score	Map	Score	Team
Ninjas in Pyjamas	16	Dust II	7	Team Wolf
HellRaisers	1	Inferno	16	Epsilon eSports
HellRaisers	16	Mirage	4	Team Wolf
Ninjas in Pyjamas	6	Cobblestone	16	Epsilon eSports
Ninjas in Pyjamas	16	Overpass	11	HellRaisers

=== Group B ===
Pos	Team	W	L	RF	RA	RD	Pts
1	Team LDLC.com	2	0	32	14	+18	6
2	Natus Vincere	2	1	47	39	+8	6
3	Copenhagen Wolves	1	2	39	40	−1	3
4	London Conspiracy	0	2	7	32	−25	0

Group B matches
Team	Score	Map	Score	Team
Team LDLC.com	16	Nuke	2	London Conspiracy
Natus Vincere	16	Inferno	4	Copenhagen Wolves
Copenhagen Wolves	16	Cache	5	London Conspiracy
Team LDLC.com	16	Inferno	12	Natus Vincere
Natus Vincere	19	Dust II	17	Copenhagen Wolves

=== Group C ===
Pos	Team	W	L	RF	RA	RD	Pts
1	Fnatic	2	0	35	23	+12	6
2	Virtus.pro	2	1	48	28	+20	6
3	Team iBUYPOWER	1	2	33	45	−12	3
4	dAT Team	0	2	15	32	−17	0

Group C matches
Team	Score	Map	Score	Team
Virtus.pro	16	Overpass	7	dAT Team
Fnatic	16	Cobblestone	7	Team iBUYPOWER
Team iBUYPOWER	16	Cobblestone	6	dAT Team
Virtus.pro	16	Overpass	19	Fnatic
Virtus.pro	16	Cache	2	Team iBUYPOWER

=== Group D ===
Pos	Team	W	L	RF	RA	RD	Pts
1	Cloud9	2	0	38	32	+4	6
2	Team Dignitas	2	1	46	26	+20	6
3	Titan	1	2	35	39	−4	3
4	Vox Eminor	0	2	10	32	−22	0

Group D matches
Team	Score	Map	Score	Team
Team Dignitas	16	Dust II	9	Vox Eminor
Cloud9	22	Dust II	18	Titan
Titan	16	Nuke	1	Vox Eminor
Team Dignitas	14	Mirage	16	Cloud9
Team Dignitas	16	Nuke	2	Titan

== Playoffs ==
=== Bracket ===
Quarterfinals
Fnatic	2
Natus Vincere	1
Epsilon eSports	0
Team Dignitas	2
Team LDLC.com	2
Virtus.pro	0
Cloud9	1
Ninjas in Pyjamas	2

Semifinals
Fnatic	2
Team Dignitas	0
Team LDLC.com	1
Ninjas in Pyjamas	2

Finals
Fnatic	1
Ninjas in Pyjamas	2

=== Quarterfinals ===
Fnatic vs Natus Vincere
Team	Score	Map	Score	Team
Fnatic	16	Inferno	11	Natus Vincere
Fnatic	7	Dust II	16	Natus Vincere
Fnatic	16	Nuke	14	Natus Vincere

Epsilon eSports vs Team Dignitas
Team	Score	Map	Score	Team
Epsilon eSports	9	Dust II	16	Team Dignitas
Epsilon eSports	8	Inferno	16	Team Dignitas
Epsilon eSports	–	Overpass	–	Team Dignitas

Team LDLC.com vs Virtus.pro
Team	Score	Map	Score	Team
Team LDLC.com	16	Dust II	14	Virtus.pro
Team LDLC.com	16	Mirage	12	Virtus.pro
Team LDLC.com	–	Inferno	–	Virtus.pro

Cloud9 vs Ninjas in Pyjamas
Team	Score	Map	Score	Team
Cloud9	16	Nuke	8	Ninjas in Pyjamas
Cloud9	14	Dust II	16	Ninjas in Pyjamas
Cloud9	14	Cobblestone	16	Ninjas in Pyjamas

=== Semifinals ===
Fnatic vs Team Dignitas
Team	Score	Map	Score	Team
Fnatic	16	Dust II	11	Team Dignitas
Fnatic	16	Overpass	14	Team Dignitas
Fnatic	–	Inferno	–	Team Dignitas

Team LDLC.com vs Ninjas in Pyjamas
Team	Score	Map	Score	Team
Team LDLC.com	16	Inferno	10	Ninjas in Pyjamas
Team LDLC.com	6	Nuke	16	Ninjas in Pyjamas
Team LDLC.com	14	Cobblestone	16	Ninjas in Pyjamas

=== Finals ===
Fnatic vs Ninjas in Pyjamas
Team	Score	Map	Score	Team
Fnatic	11	Cobblestone	16	Ninjas in Pyjamas
Fnatic	16	Cache	8	Ninjas in Pyjamas
Fnatic	13	Inferno	16	Ninjas in Pyjamas

== Final standings ==
Place	Prize Money	Team	Seed for DreamHack Winter 2014	Roster	Coach
1st	US$100,000	Ninjas in Pyjamas	Legends status	f0rest, GeT RiGhT, Xizt, friberg, Fifflaren	pita
2nd	US$50,000	Fnatic	Legends status	JW, flusha, pronax, olofmeister, KRiMZ	Devilwalk
3rd–4th	US$22,000	Team Dignitas	Legends status	FeTiSh, dev1ce, aizy, dupreeh, Xyp9x	3k2
3rd–4th	US$22,000	Team LDLC.com	Legends status	Uzzziii, Happy, KQLY, apEX, Maniac	MoMan
5–8th	$10,000	Epsilon eSports	Legends status	Sf, fxy0, kioShiMa, GMX, shox	–
5–8th	$10,000	Natus Vincere	Legends status	Edward, Zeus, starix, seized, GuardiaN	–
5–8th	$10,000	Virtus.pro	Legends status	TaZ, NEO, pashaBiceps, byali, Snax	–
5–8th	$10,000	Cloud9	Legends status	Hiko, sgares, n0thing, shroud, Semphis	–
9–12th	$2,000	HellRaisers	–	ANGE1, kucher, markeloff, AdreN Dosia	–
9–12th	$2,000	Copenhagen Wolves	–	gla1ve, Pimp, cajunb, karrigan, Nico	–
9–12th	$2,000	Titan	–	kennyS, SmithZz, NBK, ScreaM, Ex6TenZ	–
9–12th	$2,000	Team iBUYPOWER	–	DaZeD, Skadoodle, swag, steel, AZK	–
13–16th	$2,000	Team Wolf	–	RiTz, RiX, aStarrr, Ace, MithilF	kassad
13–16th	$2,000	London Conspiracy	–	RUBINO, rain, Skurk, prb, Polly	–
13–16th	$2,000	dAT Team	–	WorldEdit, flamie, ub1que, bondik, B1ad3	–
13–16th	$2,000	Vox Eminor	–	AZR, Havoc, SPUNJ, jks, topguN	–
