= Happy (gamer) =

French professional Valorant player

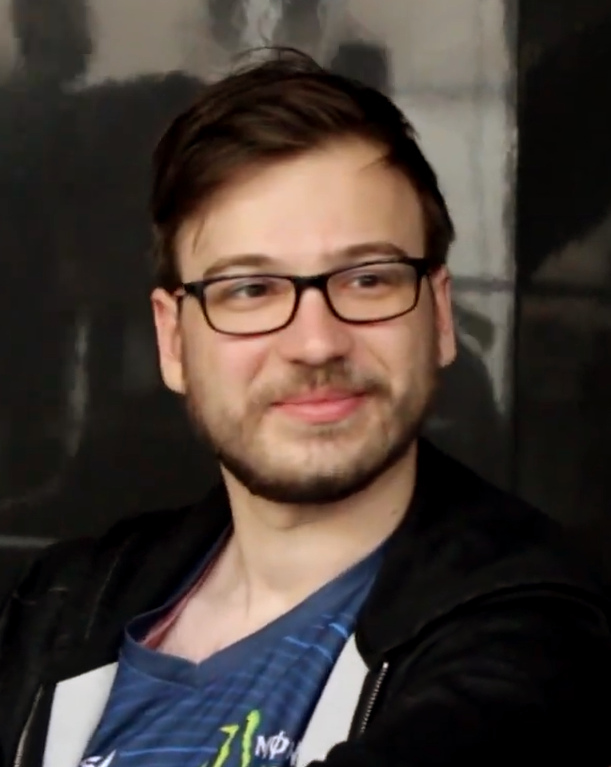
- Schopenhauer in 2017

Personal information
- Name: Vincent Cervoni Schopenhauer
- Nationality: French

Current team
- Team: MIBR
- Role: Assistant coach
- Game: Valorant

Career information
- Games: Counter-Strike: Source; Counter-Strike: Global Offensive; Valorant
- Playing career: 2007–2022
- Coaching career: 2023–present

Team history

As player:
- Counter-Strike: Global Offensive
- 2012: PRIME
- 2012–2013: eXtensive!
- 2013: LDLC
- 2013: WE GOT GAME
- 2013–2014: Recursive
- 2014: Nameless
- 2014–2015: LDLC
- 2015–2018: Team Envy
- 2018: Team Vitality
- 2019–2020: LDLC
- Valorant
- 2020: StartedFromCS
- 2021: Giants Gaming
- 2021: Excel Esports
- 2021–2022: Team BDS

As coach:
- 2023–2024: M80
- 2024–2026: Natus Vincere
- 2026-present: Made in Brazil

Career highlights and awards
- 2× CS:GO Major champion (Jönköping 2014, Cluj-Napoca 2015); 2× HLTV Top 20 Player of the Year (2014-2015) - CS:GO; HLTV Major MVP (Jönköping 2014) - CS:GO; 3× HLTV MVP - CS:GO

Vincent Cervoni Schopenhauer, better known as Happy, is a French professional Valorant coach for Made in Brazil. He formerly played professional Counter-Strike: Global Offensive (CS:GO) as a lurker/rifler for Team LDLC. As the in-game leader for Team Envy, and before that Team LDLC, Happy won two CS:GO Majors – DreamHack Winter 2014 and DreamHack Open Cluj-Napoca 2015 – and finished second at another – ESL One Cologne 2015, a performance record that led to him being ranked as one of the best players in the game's history. Happy is considered a star of the French CS:GO scene and along with Ex6TenZ, one of the country's best in-game leaders. Before CS:GO, he played Counter-Strike: Source under the name EMSTQD.

== Counter-Strike: Source ==
Vincent Cervoni Schopenhauer began his Counter-Strike: Source (CSS) career in December 2007 under the name "EMSTQD" when he joined with Ex6TenZ's team GlobalTeam. Based on their results, they signed with Epsilon eSports in February 2008. They became one of the best teams in France after adding RpK and shokkk to the roster, and in July, they won The eXperience LAN in Denmark.

Happy left the team to captain his own team, Creativ' in 2009. In October 2009, Happy decided to re-join Ex6TenZ's team called redLine, who were later signed by VeryGames. Together, they managed to win EPS France VI, place 2nd in Dreamhack Winter and MaXlan later that year. In February 2010 Happy left VeryGames to focus on academics. Over the next couple of years he was in-game leader in several small teams, most notably for the 2011 3DMAX squad which also featured shox, ScreaM, and apEX, with whom he managed to finish third at the 2011 Copenhagen Games.

== Counter-Strike: Global Offensive ==
=== Early CS:GO career and Team LDLC ===
After Counter-Strike: Global Offensive was released in August 2012, Vincent Cervoni Schopenhauer changed his nickname to "Happy" and formed a new team called PRIME in September 2012 with apEX and Maniac. The following month they were picked up by Team eXtensive! which became LDLC.com in January 2013.

Due to poor results LDLC decided to disband their CS:GO team in August 2013. After this Happy formed another mixed team called WE GOT GAME with players such as fxy0 or GMX. They later added kennyS, Maniac, and Uzzziii to the team. This squad was signed by Recursive eSports before the first CS:GO Major sponsored by Valve, DreamHack Winter 2013. At DreamHack, they beat Universal Soldiers and iBUYPOWER on their way to a 2nd-place finish in the group behind Ninjas in Pyjamas (NiP). In the quarter-finals they played Fnatic, who beat them 2-1 and went on to win the tournament.

Due to lack of financial resources, Recursive eSports parted ways with their CS:GO division on 20 January 2014; despite this, players stayed together and created team Nameless. After rumours that Nameless and Clan-Mystik planned to merge their teams, Happy, together with Uzzziii, Maniac, along with KQLY and apEX from Clan-Mystik, joined LDLC in February 2014.

Happy led this team to 1st place in DreamHack Valencia 2014 and a T5 placing in the second CS:GO major, EMS One Katowice, where they were defeated 0-2 by eventual Major champion Virtus.Pro. Happy led LDLC to a T3 placing at the next CS:GO Major, ESL One: Cologne 2014, where they beat Virtus.Pro in the quarterfinals before falling to eventual champion Ninjas in Pyjamas 1-2 after a 14–16 loss on the last map.

At the beginning of September 2014, a few weeks after ESL One: Cologne 2014, three LDLC players, KQLY, apEX and Maniac, left the Happy-led LDLC squad and signed with another leading French CS:GO team, Titan eSports. In response, LDLC released their roster, and Happy formed a short-lived mix team called Mercenary, which contained Shox, NBK, SmithZz and kioShiMa, and was picked up by LDLC after two days.

By late 2014, Happy was the best player on LDLC and one of the top players in the world. Happy became known for his play on the B site on the Counter-terrorist side of the Inferno map. Before the next CS:GO major, LDLC was considered to be the second-best team in the world. At DreamHack Winter in November 2014, Happy led the LDLC squad to victory over Fnatic (who withdrew after using an illegal boost in their quarterfinal round against LDLC), Natus Vincere, and Ninjas in Pyjamas (NIP) in the grand finals. In the grand finals, Happy almost had double the kills of any other player in the first round, and his play carried LDLC from a 13–15 deficit into overtime on the third and final map. For his high level of play, Happy was named tournament MVP. This victory made Happy's LDLC squad the official CS:GO world champions and possibly the best team in the world, given their victory at the major and string of second-place finishes in less important tournaments beforehand.

In January 2015, Happy led LDLC to victory at the MLG Aspen Invitational, the first CS:GO tournament organized by Major League Gaming. Happy had two crucial three-kill rounds against NIP in the first map of the grand finals, a rematch of the previous CS:GO major. Happy was the standout player of the tournament finals and was voted match MVP.

=== Team EnVyUs ===
Shortly afterwards, the players signed more lucrative contracts with Team EnVyUs. Happy's squad continued to have good results, winning 5 more 1st place titles before swapping Shox and SmithZz with Titan's KennyS and apEX. Originally it was thought that this new lineup would be less impressive than the first, but Happy lead the new lineup to another Major final at ESL One: Cologne 2015 and several other international titles in 2015.

EnVyUs won DreamHack Open London 2015 and Happy achieved an all-kill of the Team SoloMid team using a Desert Eagle that was described by Kotaku Australia as "one of the most impressive Counter-Strike plays in recent memory" and as one of the best aces in CS:GO history by Expressen.

In November 2015, EnVyUs won a second CS:GO major at DreamHack Open Cluj-Napoca, where they defeated Natus Vincere 2–0 in the grand finals. In the first match of the grand finals, played on the Train map, Happy successfully played mind games with Natus Vincere, and made a key play in the 28th round by holding the B bomb site against enemy defuse attempts using an AK-47.

In December 2015, Happy led EnVyUs to a 2–0 victory over Fnatic in the group stage of the ESL ESEA Pro League Season II finals that took them into the playoffs at their top of their group and as favourites to win the event.

In March 2016, Happy's EnVyUs team was ranked 10th in ESPN.com's CS:GO powerrankings amidst speculation that roster changes were incoming. By mid-March, Happy was replaced as EnVyUs's in-game leader by teammate NBK, with whom he had sometimes shared in-game leader duties.

Later that month at the MLG Major Championship: Columbus, Happy's streak of making the playoff bracket at every CS:GO Major was broken after EnVyUs was upset by Gambit Gaming, and became the first Legend (i.e. a top four finisher at the previous Major) to be eliminated in the group stage.

At DreamHack Masters Malmö in April 2016, Happy led EnVyUs to a comeback victory against Team Dignitas in the first game of the quarterfinals, which EnVyUs ended up winning 2–0. Happy's team was then defeated 2–0 in the semifinals by Na'vi.

=== Team Vitality ===
After a four-month break from professional Counter-Strike, happy moved to a newly founded team "Team Vitality", along with fellow French players NBK-, apEX and RpK. He would be "benched" on 28 December 2018.

=== Playstyle and leadership ===
Happy's in-game leadership style is considered controversial for its aggressive style and frequent assumption of risks such as higher than average use of force buys, executing plans with a focus on speed, and the use of baiting. Tomi Kovanen, writing for PC Gamer, argued that Happy's leadership was overshadowed by the pure skill of the team he leads, and that Happy was better as a fragger than as an in-game leader.

In September 2015, PC Gamer named Happy the 4th best CS:GO player and the best player who played in a lurker role at the time, noting that his ability to use the AWP, lead his team, and play with all the weapons in the game made him "almost a complete player". It also named Happy as possibly the most individually successful in-game leader in CS:GO history because of his status as the best player on EnVyUS, which was a top three team for 2015.

In a January 2016 interview with Splyce, Happy said that he had "kind of destroyed the strats heavy meta" because of his preference for flexible, unorthodox strategies.

Happy is known for his play on the B site on the Counterterrorist side of the Inferno map.

== Tournament results ==
Bold denotes a CS:GO Major

=== Recursive eSports ===
- 5 - 8th — **DreamHack Winter 2013**

=== Team LDLC.com ===
- 5 - 8th — **EMS One Katowice 2014**
- 3 - 4th — **ESL One: Cologne 2014**
- 2nd — ESWC 2014
- 1st — **DreamHack Winter 2014**
- 1st — MLG X Games Aspen Invitational

=== Team EnVyUs ===
- 3-4th — Electronic Sports World Cup 2015
- 2nd — **ESL One: Cologne 2015**
- 1st — **DreamHack Open Cluj-Napoca 2015**
- 13th – 16th — **ESL One: Cologne 2016**
- 5-8th — ELEAGUE Season 1
- 1st - WESG World Finals 2016
- 1st - Dreamhack Atlanta 2017
