= Olofmeister =

Swedish Counter-Strike player

olofmeister
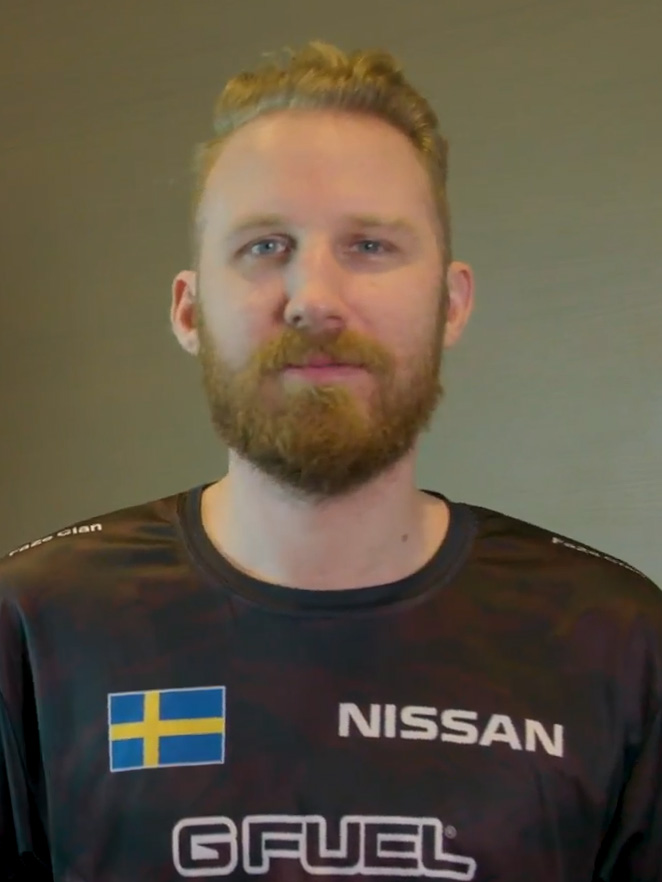
- Gustafsson in 2020

Personal information
- Name: Olof Kajbjer Gustafsson
- Born: 31 January 1992 (age 34); Sweden
- Nationality: Swedish

Current team
- Team: FaZe Clan
- Games: Counter-Strike: Global Offensive; Counter-Strike 2

Career information
- Playing career: 2012–present

Team history
- 2012: H2k
- 2013: Absolute Legends
- 2013–2014: LGB eSports
- 2014–2017: Fnatic
- 2017–present: FaZe Clan (Note: Inactive since January 2022.)

Career highlights and awards
- 2× CS:GO Major champion (Katowice 2015, Cologne 2015); HLTV Major MVP (Katowice 2015); HLTV Player of the Year (2015); 3× HLTV Top 20 Player of the Year (2014, 2016-2017); 5× HLTV MVP; 2025 HLTV Hall of Fame inductee

Olof Kajbjer Gustafsson (born 31 January 1992), better known as olofmeister, is a Swedish professional Counter-Strike 2 player for FaZe Clan. He has previously played for H2k, Absolute Legends, LGB eSports, Fnatic, and FaZe Clan. Gustafsson is widely regarded as one of the best CS:GO players in history. He has won two CSGO Majors, ESL One Katowice 2015 and ESL One Cologne 2015, as well as many other tournaments. He was inducted into the HLTV Hall of Fame in 2025.

== Early life ==
Gustafsson grew up in Tyresö. He has a brother, Karl, and a sister, Hanna. He developed an interest in playing football at the young age of four and remained active in the sport until he sustained a knee injury at the age of fifteen. He is a fan of Arsenal. The injury eventually became a catalyst for his transition from playing Counter-Strike casually, into taking it more seriously.

== Career ==
=== H2k ===
In H2k, Gustafsson played with Joel "emilio" Mako, André "keiz" Carlsson, John "wenton" Eriksson, and Hugo "huggan" Lopez.

=== Absolute Legends ===
Gustafsson quietly began his Counter-Strike: Global Offensive career in Absolute Legends and H2k without garnering much attention. The roster had their most successful run at EMS One Katowice 2014 where they placed 3rd-4th after losing 1:2 to Virtus Pro. In Absolute Legends, Gustafsson played with Andreas "schneider" Lindberg, Markus "pronax" Wallsten, Dennis "dennis" Edman, and Alexander "rdl" Redl. Following the teams break up in 2013, Andreas "schneider" Lindberg and Markus "pronax" Wallsten eventually joined Fnatic, the team Gustafsson later joined in 2014, then replacing Andreas "schneider" Lindberg.

=== LGB eSports ===
It was not until he joined LGB eSports in June 2013 where he began to rise to prominence. In LGB eSports, Gustafsson played with his former Fnatic teammates Dennis "dennis" Edman and Freddy "KRIMZ" Johansson, as well as Simon "twist" Eliasson and Isak "cype" Rydman.

=== Fnatic ===
==== 2014 ====
Along with his teammate Freddy "KRIMZ" Johansson, Gustafsson left LGB and joined fnatic in June. There, he found immediate success, helping his team to a second-place finish at the ESL One Cologne 2014 Major Championship. During one of the games in this tournament against Team Dignitas, on the map Overpass, he gained widespread attention by defusing the bomb milliseconds before a Molotov could kill him, securing match point. Subsequently, commemorative graffiti was added on the map and a weapon skin to Glock-18 (Glock-18 | Sacrifice in CS20 case) was added in the game. In the months following, Fnatic saw tremendous success, and were favorites going into DreamHack Winter 2014, the following Major Championship. After advancing from a second-place finish in their group, Fnatic were seeded against rivals Team LDLC in the quarter-final. During the match, Gustafsson became the center of controversy when he was boosted by his teammates into an, unbeknownst to him, illegal position which allowed his team to comeback from a nine-round deficit and win the match. After LDLC filed a complaint against them which ruled that the match had to be replayed, Fnatic filed a counter complaint, pointing out that LDLC had used a similar position in the first half. The tournament organiser ruled that the entire map should be replayed, however Fnatic forfeited the game and withdrew from the tournament. The incident became infamous in the CS:GO community where Gustafsson and the map Overpass were nicknamed "Boostmeister" and "Olofpass" respectively.

Following the event, Gustafsson considered leaving Fnatic and the game all together, but wound up staying after a successful run at the ESEA Invite Season 17 Global Finals.

==== 2015 ====
In February, Fnatic won the IOS Pantamera tournament after beating Titan in the finals. In March, Fnatic won ESL One Katowice 2015, the first Major Championship of the year. In August, Fnatic became the first team to win two consecutive Major Championships in a row, as they were crowned champions of ESL One Cologne 2015. At DreamHack Open Cluj-Napoca 2015, the third Major Championship of the year, Fnatic finished 5-8th.

After Markus "pronax" Wallsten left Fnatic on the 12 November 2015, they recruited Gustafsson's long-time friend and former teammate Dennis "dennis" Edman. The team proceeded to win all three remaining tournaments of the year: FACEIT DreamHack Winter 2015, Fragbite Masters Season 5, and ESL ESEA Pro League Season II - Finals.

Gustafsson was widely regarded as the best Counter-Strike player of 2015.

==== 2016 ====
In January, Gustafsson and his team won the SLTV Starseries XIV over Natus Vincere. On 5 March, Gustafsson and Fnatic won the IEM Katowice World Championship 2016, beating Luminosity Gaming 3–0 in the finals. Fnatic placed 5–8th at the MLG Major Championship: Columbus in April. Shortly thereafter on 8 April, it was announced that Gustafsson would be taking a break from competitive play due to a repetitive strain injury of a hand and would be temporarily replaced by Niclas "Plessen" Plessen; whom was shortly replaced by John "wenton" Eriksson.

=== FaZe Clan ===
On 20 August 2017, Gustafsson officially signed with FaZe Clan, ending his 3-year tenure with Fnatic. Since joining the team, Gustafsson temporarily left the team for personal reasons, requiring the team to use stand-ins 'Xizt', a Swedish coach/analyst for NiP, and 'Cromen', a Norwegian player who is currently inactive. On 25 May 2018, FaZe announced Gustafsson's return to the team, but after a short while, it was confirmed that Gustafsson was 'not ready' to play. Since then, Gustafsson made his return to competitive play on 10 July. Gustafsson again stepped away from competitive play on 23 May 2020. However, he returned to FaZe Clan as a stand-in in October.

Since joining FaZe Clan, he has won 10 events including: ESL One: New York 2017, Epicenter 2018 and Blast Pro Series Copenhagen 2019, yet he has not won a major playing with FaZe Clan. He reached the grand final of ELEAGUE Major: Boston 2018, but they were defeated by Cloud9 in the finals.

In May 2020, Gustafsson announced that he will take an indefinite break from Counter-Strike and FaZe Clan, citing in a statement that he had become "increasingly fatigued" and "losing [...] motivation". On 28 October, Gustafsson returned to FaZe Clan's starting lineup as a stand-in, upon the departure of Nikola "NiKo" Kovač. Following the departure of Coldzera, Olofmeister returned to the active roster on June 14, 2021, as a permanent member.

== Bibliography ==
- CS:GO Player Profiles - olofmeister - Fnatic. Perf. Dreamhack and Valve. YouTube. YouTube, Oct.-Nov. 2015. Web. 21 Feb. 2016.
- "CSGObuff | olofmeister Olof Kajbjer Professional Profile. News, Matches, Teams." CSGObuff. N.p., n.d. Web. 21 Feb. 2016.
