= DreamHack Winter 2014 =

Counter-Strike video game championship

- 2014
- The DreamHack Winter 2014 logo

Tournament information
- Sport: Counter-Strike: Global Offensive
- Location: Jönköping, Sweden
- Dates: November 27, 2014–November 29, 2014
- Administrator: Valve; DreamHack
- Tournament format(s): 16 team round-robin group stage Eight team single-elimination playoff
- Host: DreamHack
- Venue: Elmia
- Teams: 16
- Purse: $250,000 USD

Final positions
- Champions: Team LDLC.com (1st title)
- 1st runners-up: Ninjas in Pyjamas
- 2nd runners-up: Virtus.pro; Natus Vincere
- MVP: Vincent "Happy" Schopenhauer

DreamHack Winter 2014 was the fourth Counter-Strike: Global Offensive Major Championship, held from November 27–29, 2014 at Elmia in Jönköping. It was organized by DreamHack and sponsored by Valve. The tournament had a total prize pool of US$250,000. The eight quarter-finalists from the previous Major, ESL One Cologne 2014, received direct invitations, while qualifiers were held for the remaining spots.

The tournament was the setting of one of the earliest significant controversies in Global Offensive esports. In the third game of the quarterfinal matchup between Fnatic and Team LDLC, Fnatic player Olof "olofmeister" Kajbjer Gustafsson performed a controversial "pixelwalk" boost to help his team come back from a 13–3 deficit to win the deciding map. Following the matchup, DreamHack ordered the game to be replayed, after both teams were found to have used the glitch, although to differing levels of success. Following significant community backlash, Fnatic forfeited the match and withdrew from the tournament.

Team LDLC would then go on to win the event after beating Ninjas in Pyjamas 2–1 in the finals.

== Format ==
The top eight teams from ESL One Cologne 2014 ("Legends") received direct invitations to DreamHack Winter 2014. Two of these invitations were rescinded after a cheating scandal, leaving ten spots (the "Challengers") to be filled by a mixtures of qualifiers and invites. Five teams from Europe, one team from North America, and two teams from a "Last Call LAN Qualifier" qualified for the tournament. After the scheduled qualifiers were completed, two teams were directly invited to the Major to fill the final two spots.

Teams were split up into four groups, and all group matches were best-of-ones. The highest seed would play the lowest seed in each group and the second and third seeds would play against each other. The winner of those two matches would play each other to determine which team moved on to the playoff stage, while the losers of the first round of matches also played. The loser of the lower match was then eliminated from the tournament. With one team advanced and one eliminated, the two remaining teams would play an elimination match for the second playoff spot. This format is known as the GSL format, named for the Global StarCraft II League.

The playoffs bracket consisted of eight teams, two from each group. All of these matches were best-of-three, single elimination. Teams advanced in the bracket until a winner was decided.

=== Map pool ===
The seven-map pool did not change from ESL One Cologne 2014. Before each match in the group stage, both teams banned two maps. The map for the match was then randomly selected from the remaining three maps. In the playoffs, each team first banned one map, then chose one map. The two chosen maps were the first two maps in the best-of-three. If the series were to require a third map, the map was randomly selected from the three remaining maps.

Maps

- Cache
- Cobblestone
- Dust II
- Inferno
- Mirage
- Nuke
- Overpass

== Olofboost controversy ==
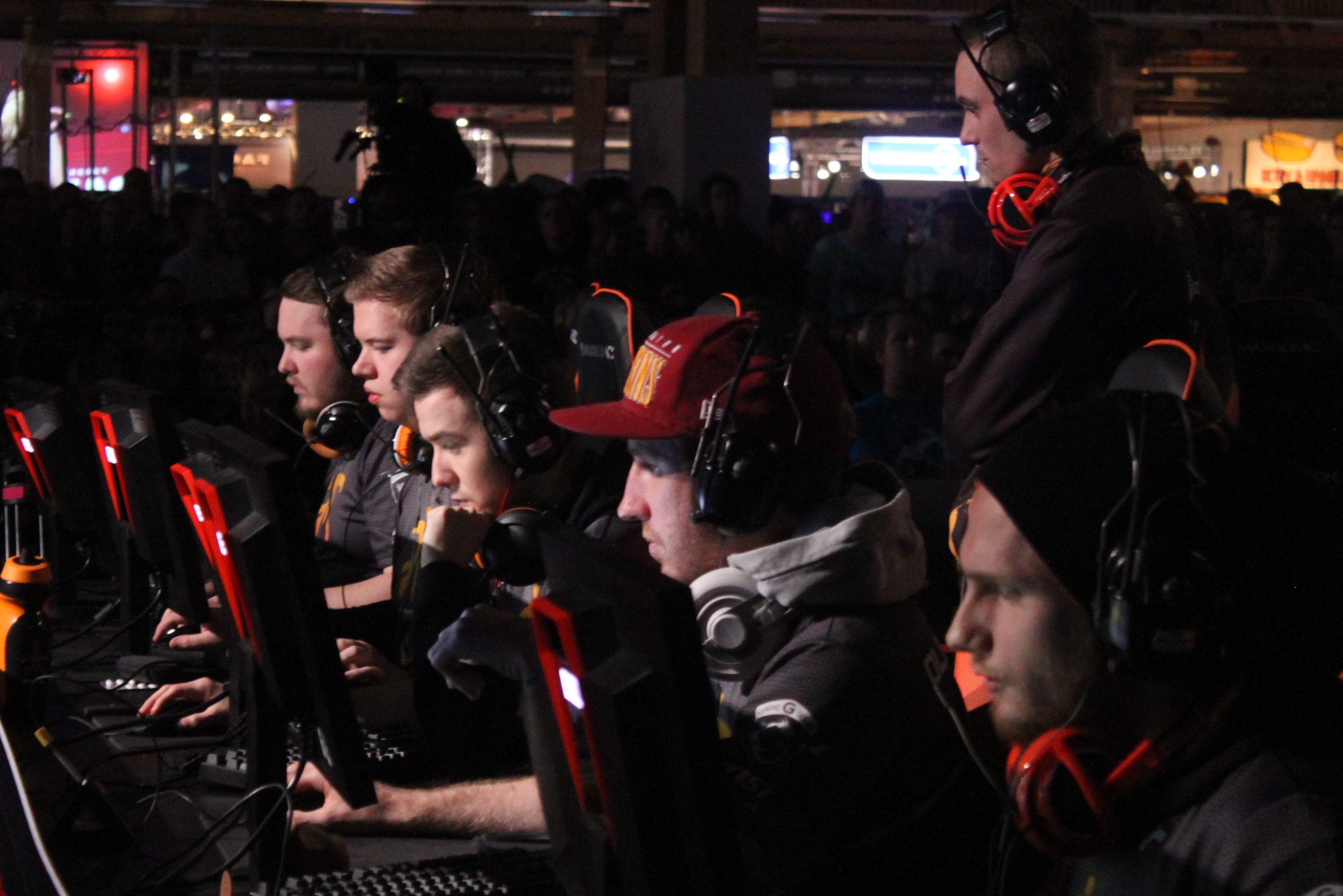
Fnatic competing at DreamHack Winter 2014.

DreamHack Winter 2014 was the site of the Fnatic pixel-walking controversy, more commonly referred to as the Olofboost. The dispute centered on a series of controversial plays made by Swedish Counter-Strike: Global Offensive (CS:GO) player Olof "olofmeister" Kajbjer Gustafsson. Fnatic and Team LDLC.com (LDLC) had advanced in the group stage phase of the tournament, where the would play each other in the quarterfinals. LDLC won the first game of the match on Dust II 16–10 while Fnatic came back to win the second game 16–8 on Cache.

The third game of the match was played on Overpass. LDLC won the first half of the game 12–3. Following a first–round win by LDLC that brought the score to 13–3, olofmeister exploited an invisible "pixel-walk" glitch, allowing him to use a series of illegal boosts and jumps to place himself at an increased height; this enabled him to see a greater portion of the map and shoot from a greater height, unseen by LDLC. Fnatic would win thirteen rounds in a row unanswered and won the game 16–13, advancing to the semi-finals.

=== Reactions and aftermath ===
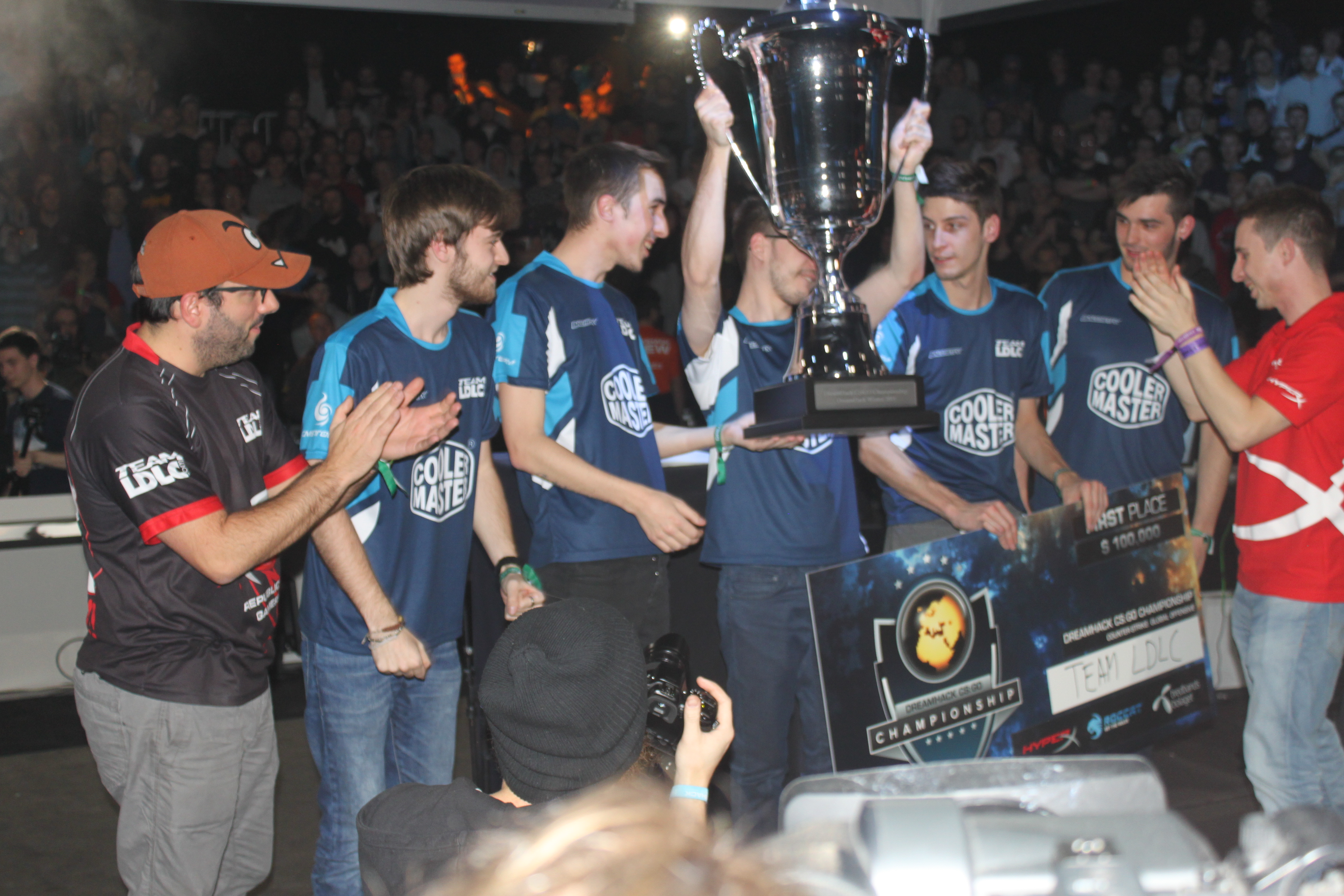
After Fnatic forfeited the third game, Team LDLC.com would go on to win their first Major tournament.

After winning the match, Fnatic coach Jonatan "Devilwalk" Lundberg gave an interview where he revealed that the team had been practicing the boost strat two months before the Major.

Following the matchup, LDLC lodged a protest to DreamHack, the tournament organizers, claiming that Fnatic and olofmeister used an illegal "pixelwalk" on invisible ledges outside of the map geometry not intended for player use. LDLC player Nathan "NBK" Schmidt criticized the move, saying that "the CS:GO scene will turn into a joke" if Fnatic weren't disqualified. Semifinalists Ninjas in Pyjamas and Virtus.pro both supported LDLC, with Virtus.pro tweeting that Fnatic had "no respect for the fans."

DreamHack ruled in favor of LDLC and ordered the second half of the game to be replayed. Fnatic launched a counter-protest claiming LDLC also used a pixelwalk during the match. DreamHack then ordered the entire game to be replayed, but following intense backlash from fans and players Fnatic decided to forfeit the map, becoming the first team to forfeit a match in Major history.

LDLC advanced to the semifinals against Natus Vincere and won the series 2–0. LDLC would defeat defending Major champions Ninjas in Pyjamas in the grand final, winning the organization's first Major championship. Fnatic would later win ESL One Katowice 2015 and ESL One Cologne 2015 to become the first organization to win multiple Majors and the first to win back-to-back Majors.

=== Legacy ===
Valve released a patch after the tournament that removed the pixel-walk from the map, which also included a sign reading "Geländer übersteigen verboten!" (German for "Climbing over railings prohibited!") below where the incident took place.

The controversy was featured in Red Bull Gaming's documentary Memories of CS:GO. Devilwalk reflected that Fnatic were "completely isolated" from the professional Counter-Strike scene after the Olofboost controversy. Olofmeister said in an interview that he was "very close to quitting."

== Regional qualifiers ==
=== European Closed Qualifier ===
European Qualifier

Round 1
Team LDLC.com	2
AliGon	0
dAT Team	1
myXMG	2
3DMAX	1
Flipsid3 Tactics	2
mousesports	0
Planetkey Dynamics	2
Copenhagen Wolves	0
ESC Gaming	2
London Conspiracy	1
Team Alternate	2
x6tence	0
PENTA Sports	2
HellRaisers	2
duttdutt	0

Round 2
Team LDLC.com	2
myXMG	0
Flipsid3 Tactics	0
Planetkey Dynamics	2
ESC Gaming	2
Team Alternate	0
PENTA Sports	2
HellRaisers	0

DH Winter 2014
Team LDLC.com	Q
Planetkey Dynamics	Q
ESC Gaming	Q
PENTA Sports	Q

DH Winter 2014
DreamHack Winter 2014	→
DreamHack Winter 2014	→

5th Place Decider
myXMG	2
Flipsid3 Tactics	1
Team Alternate	0
HellRaisers	2

DH Winter 2014
myXMG	0
HellRaisers	2

=== North America Closed Qualifier ===
North America Qualifier

Quarterfinals
Team iBUYPOWER	16
WeRidePonies	2
eLevate	16
'SapphireKelwona	5
NetCodeGuides.com	16
dxm	5
Denial eSports	16
The Stream Team	14

Semifinals
Team iBUYPOWER	16
eLevate	7
NetCodeGuides.com	16
Denial eSports	10

Finals
Team iBUYPOWER	2
NetCodeGuides.com	1

=== Last Call LAN Qualifier ===
Last Call Qualifier; Stockholm, Sweden

5th Place Decider
Copenhagen Wolves	2
3DMAX	1
Flipsid3 Tactics	2
London Conspiracy	0

DH Winter 2014
Copenhagen Wolves	16
Flipsid3 Tactics	6

== Broadcast talent ==
Host

- Scott "SirScoots" Smith

Stage Host

- James Duffield

Analyst

- Duncan "Thorin" Shields

Commentators

- Auguste "Semmler" Massonnat
- Anders Blume
- Robin "Fifflaren" Johansson
- Stuart "TosspoT" Saw

== Teams ==
The most notable pre-Major team change came after a cheating scandal involving three French players. Two teams that achieved Legends status at the previous Major were dropped from their Legends spots. Titan, whose roster achieved Legends status as Team LDLC.com, was disqualified from the tournament after Hovik "KQLY" Tovmassian was caught cheating. At the same time, Epsilon eSports was disqualified after Gordon "Sf" Giry was found to be cheating. The two players and Simon "smn" Beck were then VAC banned by Valve and were permanently banned from any Valve-sponsored tournaments, including Majors. Titan and Epsilons' spots were then filled by Copenhagen Wolves and Flipsid3 Tactics, teams advancing from a new qualifier.

Legends

- Ninjas in Pyjamas
- Fnatic
- Team Dignitas
- Natus Vincere
- Cloud9
- Virtus.pro

Challengers

- Team LDLC.com
- Planetkey Dynamics
- PENTA Sports
- ESC Gaming
- HellRaisers
- Team iBUYPOWER
- Copenhagen Wolves
- Flipsid3 Tactics
- myXMG (Note: Bravado Gaming and myXMG were directly invited to the tournament. Bravado did not play in any qualifier. myXMG failed to qualify through the European qualifier but was still invited.)
- Bravado Gaming

== Group stage ==
=== Group A ===
Pos	Team	W	L	RF	RA	RD	Pts
1	HellRaisers	2	0	32	19	+13	6
2	Fnatic	2	1	46	23	+23	6
3	Cloud9	1	2	26	33	−7	3
4	Bravado Gaming	0	2	3	32	−29	0

Group A Matches
Team	Score	Map	Score	Team
Fnatic	16	Mirage	2	Bravado Gaming
Cloud9	5	Inferno	16	HellRaisers
Fnatic	14	Mirage	16	HellRaisers
Cloud9	16	Cache	1	Bravado Gaming
Fnatic	16	Dust II	5	Cloud9

=== Group B ===
Pos	Team	W	L	RF	RA	RD	Pts
1	Team Dignitas	2	0	32	16	+16	6
2	PENTA Sports	2	1	41	41	+0	6
3	Team iBUYPOWER	1	2	36	36	+0	3
4	Copenhagen Wolves	0	2	16	32	−16	0

Group B Matches
Team	Score	Map	Score	Team
Team Dignitas	16	Nuke	9	PENTA Sports
Team iBUYPOWER	16	Nuke	4	Copenhagen Wolves
Team Dignitas	16	Nuke	7	Team iBUYPOWER
PENTA Sports	16	Dust II	12	Copenhagen Wolves
Team iBUYPOWER	13	Inferno	16	PENTA Sports

=== Group C ===
Pos	Team	W	L	RF	RA	RD	Pts
1	Team LDLC.com	2	0	32	17	+15	6
2	Ninjas in Pyjamas	2	1	41	36	+5	6
3	ESC Gaming	1	2	33	45	−12	3
4	Planetkey Dynamics	0	2	15	32	−17	0

Group C Matches
Team	Score	Map	Score	Team
Ninjas in Pyjamas	16	Overpass	2	Planetkey Dynamics
Team LDLC.com	16	Cobblestone	4	ESC Gaming
Ninjas in Pyjamas	13	Overpass	16	Team LDLC.com
ESC Gaming	16	Mirage	13	Planetkey Dynamics
Ninjas in Pyjamas	16	Cache	13	ESC Gaming

=== Group D ===
Pos	Team	W	L	RF	RA	RD	Pts
1	Virtus.pro	2	0	32	4	+28	6
2	Natus Vincere	2	1	37	39	−2	6
3	Flipsid3 Tactics	1	2	39	46	−7	3
4	myXMG	0	2	13	32	−19	0

Group D Matches
Team	Score	Map	Score	Team
Virtus.pro	16	Inferno	2	myXMG
Natus Vincere	16	Mirage	8	Flipsid3 Tactics
Virtus.pro	16	Nuke	2	Natus Vincere
Flipsid3 Tactics	16	Mirage	11	myXMG
Natus Vincere	19	Overpass	15	Flipsid3 Tactics

== Playoffs ==
=== Bracket ===
Quarterfinals
HellRaisers	0
Ninjas in Pyjamas	2
Virtus.pro	2
PENTA Sports	0
Team LDLC.com	2 (Note: The third map originally ended with a Fnatic win. However, the match was to be replayed due to both teams violating in-game rules. After community backlash directed at Fnatic, Fnatic forfeited the match.)
Fnatic	1
Team Dignitas	0
Natus Vincere	2

Semifinals
Ninjas in Pyjamas	2
Virtus.pro	0
Team LDLC.com	2
Natus Vincere	0

Finals
Ninjas in Pyjamas	1
Team LDLC.com	2

=== Quarterfinals scores ===
==== HellRaisers vs. Ninjas in Pyjamas ====
Casters: Anders Blume & Semmler

HellRaisers vs. Ninjas in Pyjamas
Team	Score	Map	Score	Team
HellRaisers	5	Dust II	16	Ninjas in Pyjamas
HellRaisers	5	Inferno	16	Ninjas in Pyjamas
HellRaisers	–	Overpass	–	Ninjas in Pyjamas

==== Virtus.pro vs. PENTA Sports ====
Casters: TosspoT & Fifflaren

Virtus.pro vs. PENTA Sports
Team	Score	Map	Score	Team
Virtus.pro	16	Cache	9	PENTA Sports
Virtus.pro	16	Mirage	5	PENTA Sports
Virtus.pro	–	Nuke	–	PENTA Sports

==== Team LDLC.com vs. Fnatic ====
Casters: Anders Blume & Semmler

Team LDLC.com vs. Fnatic
Team	Score	Map	Score	Team
Team LDLC.com	16	Dust II	10	Fnatic
Team LDLC.com	8	Cache	16	Fnatic
Team LDLC.com	W	Overpass	F	Fnatic

==== Team Dignitas vs. Natus Vincere ====
Casters: TosspoT & Fifflaren

Team Dignitas vs. Natus Vincere
Team	Score	Map	Score	Team
Team Dignitas	3	Cobblestone	16	Natus Vincere
Team Dignitas	13	Mirage	16	Natus Vincere
Team Dignitas	–	Overpass	–	Natus Vincere

=== Semifinals scores ===
==== Ninjas in Pyjamas vs. Virtus.pro ====
Casters: TosspoT vs. Fifflaren

Ninjas in Pyjamas vs. Virtus.pro
Team	Score	Map	Score	Team
Ninjas in Pyjamas	22	Nuke	20	Virtus.pro
Ninjas in Pyjamas	10	Cache	16	Virtus.pro
Ninjas in Pyjamas	16	Inferno	8	Virtus.pro

==== Team LDLC.com vs. Natus Vincere ====
Casters: Anders Blume & Semmler

Team LDLC.com vs. Natus Vincere
Team	Score	Map	Score	Team
Team LDLC.com	16	Mirage	11	Natus Vincere
Team LDLC.com	16	Inferno	11	Natus Vincere
Team LDLC.com	–	Cobblestone	–	Natus Vincere

=== Finals scores ===
NiP was the defending Major champions and was also making its fourth straight Major final appearance. Team LDLC.com became the first French team to appear in a CS:GO Major final.

Casters: Anders Blume & Semmler

Ninjas in Pyjamas vs. Team LDLC.com
Team	Score	Map	Score	Team
Ninjas in Pyjamas	10	Dust II	16	Team LDLC.com
Ninjas in Pyjamas	16	Inferno	4	Team LDLC.com
Ninjas in Pyjamas	16	Overpass	19	Team LDLC.com

== Final standings ==
Place	Prize Money	Team	Seed for ESL One Katowice 2015	Roster	Coach
1st	US$100,000	Team LDLC.com	Legends status	kioShiMa, Happy, SmithZz, NBK, shox	MoMaN
2nd	US$50,000	Ninjas in Pyjamas	Legends status	f0rest, GeT RiGhT, Xizt, friberg, Maikelele	pita
3rd–4th	US$22,000	Natus Vincere	Legends status	Edward, Zeus, starix, seized, GuardiaN	–
3rd–4th	US$22,000	Virtus.pro	Legends status	TaZ, NEO, pashaBiceps, byali, Snax	–
5–8th	US$10,000	HellRaisers	Legends status	ANGE1, kucher, markeloff, s1mple, Dosia	B1ad3
5–8th	US$10,000	Fnatic	Legends status	JW, flusha, pronax, olofmeister, KRiMZ	Devilwalk
5–8th	US$10,000	Team Dignitas	Legends status	FeTiSh, dev1ce, cajunb, dupreeh, Xyp9x	3k2
5–8th	US$10,000	PENTA Sports	Legends status	r0bs3n, Spidii, denis, kRYSTAL, fel1x	–
9–12th	US$2,000	Flipsid3 Tactics	Main Qualifier invitation	twist, berg, zende, BENDJI, Dumas	–
9–12th	US$2,000	ESC Gaming	Main Qualifier invitation	innocent, SZPERO, mouz, MINISE, rallen	–
9–12th	US$2,000	Cloud9	Main Qualifier invitation	Hiko, sgares, n0thing, shroud, SEMPHIS	–
9–12th	US$2,000	Team iBuyPower	Main Qualifier invitation	nitr0, Skadoodle, swag, desi, AZK	lrukandji
13–16th	US$2,000	Bravado Gaming	Main Qualifier invitation	Cent, Detrony, Racno, bLacKpoisoN, deviaNt	–
13–16th	US$2,000	Copenhagen Wolves	Main Qualifier invitation	gla1ve, Pimp, tenzki, Kjaerbye, cadiaN	–
13–16th	US$2,000	Planetkey Dynamics	Main Qualifier invitation	strux1, alexRr, Troubley, nex, stavros	–
13–16th	US$2,000	myXMG	Main Qualifier invitation	MSL, HUNDEN, AcilioN, Friis, smF	–
