= ESL One Cologne 2015 =

Sixth CS:GO major championship

- 2015
- The ESL One Cologne 2015 logo

Tournament information
- Sport: Counter-Strike: Global Offensive
- Location: Cologne, North Rhine-Westphalia, Germany
- Dates: August 14, 2015–August 18, 2015
- Administrator: Valve; ESL
- Tournament format(s): GSL double elimination group stage Eight team single elimination playoff
- Venue: Lanxess Arena
- Teams: 16 teams
- Purse: $250,000 USD

Final positions
- Champions: Fnatic (3rd title)
- 1st runners-up: Team EnVyUs
- 2nd runners-up: Virtus.pro; Team SoloMid
- MVP: Robin "flusha" Rönnquist

ESL One Cologne 2015 was the sixth Counter-Strike: Global Offensive Major Championship that was held from August 14–18, 2015 at the Lanxess Arena in Cologne. It was organized by Electronic Sports League. The Cologne event was the first ESL tournament that required competitors to take drug tests, which all came up negative. The tournament had a total prize pool of US$250,000. The online livestream was viewed by around 27 million viewers with a peak of 1.3 million concurrent viewers.

Eight teams were in the playoffs. Fnatic, Luminosity Gaming, Natus Vincere, Ninjas in Pyjamas, Team EnVyUs, Team SoloMid, and Virtus.pro were returning Legends. Team Kinguin was the only new Legend in the tournament, replacing mousesports, which failed to make the top eight. Fnatic, which defeated Luminosity Gaming and Virtus.pro, was the winner of the event after defeating Team EnVyUs, which defeated Natus Vincere and Team SoloMid, 2–0. Fnatic was the first team to have consecutive major titles and would be the only team to do so until SK Gaming (which was Luminosity Gaming at this tournament) when the Brazilian team won MLG Columbus 2016 and ESL One Cologne 2016.

== Format ==
The top eight teams from ESL One Katowice 2015 ("Legends") received direct invitations to Katowice. In addition, eight other teams (the "Challengers") emerged from offline qualifiers: four from the European qualifier, two from the Asian qualifier, and two from the North American qualifier.

Teams were split up into four groups, and all group matches were best-of-ones. In the first group stage, the highest seed played the lowest seed in each group and the second and third seeds played each other. The winner of those two matches then played each other to determine which team moved on to the playoff stage; the loser of this match received a "high seed" in the second group stage. The two losers from the initial matches were given "low seeds" in the second group stage, while the high seed received a bye. In the second group stage, the groups were shuffled so that teams faced new opponents. However, each group still contained one high seed and two low seeds. The two low seeds in each group played each other, and the winner of that match played the high seed in the group. The winner of that match qualified for the playoff stage.

The playoffs bracket consisted of eight teams, two from each group. All of these matches were best-of-three, single elimination. Teams advanced in the bracket until a winner was decided.

=== Map pool ===
There were seven maps to choose from. However, Nuke was taken out of the active map pool and Train was brought back in for the first time since the second Major, EMS One Katowice 2014. Before each match in the group stage, both teams banned two maps. The map for the match was then randomly selected from the remaining three maps. In the playoffs, each team first banned one map, then chose one map. The two chosen maps were the first two maps in the best-of-three. If the series were to require a third map, the map was randomly selected from the three remaining maps.

Maps

- Cache
- Cobblestone
- Dust II
- Inferno
- Mirage
- Overpass
- Train

== Qualifiers ==
Four teams from the European Qualifier, two teams from the Asian Qualifier, and two teams from the North American Qualifier moved on to the major.

Sixteen European teams were placed in two separate brackets. Two teams from each bracket moved on to the major. In the Asian and North American Qualifiers, eight teams were placed in two groups and were played out like in previous majors' group stages. The top two moved on to a four team bracket. The winners of the matches move on to the major.

=== European Qualifier ===
EU Group A Bracket; Cologne, Germany

Upper round 1	Upper round 2	Upper final	Qualified
Team Property	16
PiTER	7
Team Property	14
Team Dignitas	16
Team Dignitas	16
OverGaming	9
Team Dignitas	8
Team Kinguin	16
FlipSid3 Tactics	14
KILLERFISH	16
KILLERFISH	8
Team Kinguin	16
Team Kinguin	16
PENTA Sports	9	Team Kinguin
FlipSid3 Tactics
Lower round 1	Lower round 2	Lower round 3	Lower final
KILLERFISH	16
PiTER	8	OverGaming	8	Team Dignitas	16
OverGaming	16	KILLERFISH	16	FlipSid3 Tactics	19
FlipSid3 Tactics	19
Team Property	3
FlipSid3 Tactics	19	FlipSid3 Tactics	16
PENTA Sports	17

EU Group B Bracket; Cologne, Germany

Upper round 1	Upper round 2	Upper final	Qualified
HellRaisers	19
LGB eSports	17
HellRaisers	14
Team eBettle	16
Epiphany Bolt	19
Team eBettle	22
Team eBettle	25
Titan	23
Team ROCCAT	9
k1ck eSports.hu	16
k1ck eSports.hu	8
Titan	16
Gamers2	5
Titan	16	Team eBettle
Titan
Lower round 1	Lower round 2	Lower round 3	Lower final
k1ck eSports.hu	9
LGB eSports	16	LGB eSports	16	Titan	16
Epiphany Bolt	11	LGB eSports	16	LGB eSports	2
HellRaisers	7
HellRaisers	16
Team ROCCAT	5	Gamers2	9
Gamers2	16

=== Asian Qualifier ===
Asian Qualifier Bracket; Kuala Lumpur, Malaysia

Semifinals
Team Immunity	2
MVP Karnal	0
Renegades	2
myRevenge.kr	0

Qualified
Team Immunity
Renegades

=== North American Qualifier ===
NA Qualifier Bracket; Burbank, California

Semifinals
Cloud9	2
eLevate	0
Counter Logic Gaming	2
Team Liquid	0

Qualified
Cloud9
Counter Logic Gaming

== Broadcast talent ==
Hosts

- Oliver James "OJ Borg" Borg D'Anastasi
- William "Chobra" Cho

Analysts

- Henry "HenryG" Greer
- Robin "Fifflaren" Johansson
- Casper "cadiaN" Møller
- Jason "moses" O'Toole

Commentators

- Anders Blume
- Jason "JKaplan" Kaplan
- Auguste "Semmler" Massonnat
- Joe Miller
- Alex "Machine" Richardson
- Lauren "Pansy" Scott
- Leigh "Deman" Smith

Observers

- Yanko "YNk" Paunović
- Simon "pAn" Schumacher

Others

- Sean Charles (Reporting)
- Soe "Soembie" Gschwind-Penski (Esports in Cinemas)

=== Broadcasts ===
All streams were broadcast on Twitch in various languages.

- ESL CSGO
- 99Damage
- Bebe
- BiDa
- Castpoint
- CNONE
- ESL China
- ESL CZSK
- ESL Italy
- ESL Poland
- ESL Spain
- ESL Turkey
- Fraglider
- GPlayTV
- Hungarian Esport TV
- KeitaTV
- Mito
- NVIDIA France
- ON
- Storm Studio
- striimIT
- Strimok
- VsnT
- WeAreInVICtus

== Teams ==
Legends

- Fnatic
- Ninjas in Pyjamas
- Team EnVyUs
- Virtus.pro
- Luminosity Gaming (Note: The roster of Keyd Stars was signed by Luminosity Gaming.)
- mousesports (Note: mousesports acquire PENTA Sports's Legends spot after signing Johannes "nex" Maget, Timo "Spiidi" Richter, and Denis "denis" Howell.)
- Natus Vincere
- Team SoloMid

Challengers

- Cloud9
- Counter Logic Gaming
- FlipSid3 Tactics
- Renegades
- Team eBettle
- Team Immunity
- Team Kinguin
- Titan

== Group stage 1 ==
Key
Team automatically advanced to Playoffs
Team advanced to second Group Stage as high seed
Team advanced to second Group Stage as low seed

=== Group A ===
Pos	Team	W	L	RF	RA	RD	Pts
1	Team SoloMid	2	0	32	24	+18	6
2	Ninjas in Pyjamas	1	1	19	29	−10	3
3	Counter Logic Gaming	0	1	13	16	−3	0
4	Renegades	0	1	11	16	−5	0

Group A Scores
Team	Score	Map	Score	Team
Ninjas in Pyjamas	16	Dust II	13	Counter Logic Gaming
Team SoloMid	16	Train	11	Renegades
Ninjas in Pyjamas	3	Cache	16	Team SoloMid

=== Group B ===
Pos	Team	W	L	RF	RA	RD	Pts
1	Team EnVyUs	2	0	35	19	+16	6
2	Luminosity Gaming	1	1	32	25	+7	3
3	Team Kinguin	0	1	6	16	−10	0
4	FlipSid3 Tactics	0	1	3	16	−13	0

Group B Scores
Team	Score	Map	Score	Team
Team EnVyUs	16	Inferno	3	FlipSid3 Tactics
Luminosity Gaming	16	Overpass	6	Team Kinguin
Team EnVyUs	19	Cobblestone	16	Luminosity Gaming

=== Group C ===
Pos	Team	W	L	RF	RA	RD	Pts
1	Fnatic	2	0	32	4	+28	6
2	Natus Vincere	1	1	21	33	−12	3
3	Titan	0	1	17	19	−2	0
4	Team eBettle	0	1	2	16	−14	0

Group C Scores
Team	Score	Map	Score	Team
Fnatic	16	Mirage	2	Team eBettle
Natus Vincere	19	Overpass	17	Titan
Fnatic	16	Inferno	2	Natus Vincere

=== Group D ===
Pos	Team	W	L	RF	RA	RD	Pts
1	Virtus.pro	2	0	32	16	+16	6
2	Cloud9	1	1	24	26	−2	3
3	mousesports	0	1	10	16	−10	0
4	Team Immunity	0	1	8	16	−8	0

Group D Scores
Team	Score	Map	Score	Team
Virtus.pro	16	Cobblestone	8	Team Immunity
mousesports	10	Overpass	16	Cloud9
Virtus.pro	16	Cobblestone	8	Cloud9

== Group stage 2 ==
Key
Qualified for Playoffs
Eliminated from tournament

=== Group E ===
Pos	Team	W	L	RF	RA	RD	Pts
1	Natus Vincere	1	0	16	14	+2	3
2	Counter Logic Gaming	1	1	30	30	+0	3
3	Team eBettle	0	1	14	16	−2	0

Group E Scores
Team	Score	Map	Score	Team
Counter Logic Gaming	16	Mirage	14	Team eBettle
Natus Vincere	16	Cobblestone	14	Counter Logic Gaming

=== Group F ===
Pos	Team	W	L	RF	RA	RD	Pts
1	Team Kinguin	2	0	32	26	+6	6
2	Cloud9	0	1	13	16	−3	0
3	Team Immunity	0	1	13	16	−3	0

Group F Scores
Team	Score	Map	Score	Team
Team Kinguin	16	Dust II	13	Team Immunity
Cloud9	13	Dust II	16	Team Kinguin

=== Group G ===
Pos	Team	W	L	RF	RA	RD	Pts
1	Ninjas in Pyjamas	1	0	16	5	+11	3
2	Renegades	1	1	21	25	−4	3
3	Titan	0	1	9	16	−7	0

Group G Scores
Team	Score	Map	Score	Team
Titan	9	Mirage	16	Renegades
Ninjas in Pyjamas	16	Inferno	5	Renegades

=== Group H ===
Pos	Team	W	L	RF	RA	RD	Pts
1	Luminosity Gaming	1	0	22	18	+4	3
2	FlipSid3 Tactics	1	1	34	36	−2	3
3	mousesports	0	1	14	16	−2	0

Group H Scores
Team	Score	Map	Score	Team
mousesports	14	Cobblestone	16	FlipSid3 Tactics
Luminosity Gaming	22	Cobblestone	18	FlipSid3 Tactics

== Playoffs ==
=== Bracket ===
Quarterfinals
B	Team EnVyUs	2
E	Natus Vincere	0
A	Team SoloMid	2
F	Team Kinguin	0
D	Virtus.pro	2
G	Ninjas in Pyjamas	0
C	Fnatic	2
H	Luminosity Gaming	0

Semifinals
B	Team EnVyUs	2
A	Team SoloMid	1
D	Virtus.pro	1
C	Fnatic	2

Finals
B	Team EnVyUs	0
C	Fnatic	2

=== Quarterfinals ===
==== Team EnVyUs vs. Natus Vincere ====
Casters: Anders Blume, Deman, & JKaplan

Team EnVyUs vs. Natus Vincere Scores
Team	Score	Map	Score	Team
Team EnVyUs	16	Inferno	13	Natus Vincere
Team EnVyUs	16	Mirage	10	Natus Vincere
Team EnVyUs	–	Dust II	–	Natus Vincere

==== Team SoloMid vs. Team Kinguin ====
Casters: Pansy, HenryG, & Machine

Team SoloMid vs. Team Kinguin
Team	Score	Map	Score	Team
Team SoloMid	16	Dust II	6	Team Kinguin
Team SoloMid	16	Overpass	8	Team Kinguin
Team SoloMid	–	Inferno	–	Team Kinguin

==== Virtus.pro vs. Ninjas in Pyjamas ====
Casters: Anders Blume, Semmler, & moses

Virtus.pro vs. Ninjas in Pyjamas
Team	Score	Map	Score	Team
Virtus.pro	16	Train	14	Ninjas in Pyjamas
Virtus.pro	16	Inferno	5	Ninjas in Pyjamas
Virtus.pro	–	Cache	–	Ninjas in Pyjamas

==== Fnatic vs. Luminosity Gaming ====
Casters: Deman, Joe Miller, & Fifflaren

Fnatic vs. Luminosity Gaming
Team	Score	Map	Score	Team
Fnatic	16	Train	5	Luminosity Gaming
Fnatic	16	Mirage	14	Luminosity Gaming
Fnatic	–	Cache	–	Luminosity Gaming

=== Semifinals ===
==== Team EnVyUs vs. Team SoloMid ====
Casters: Anders Blume, Semmler, & moses

Team EnVyUs vs. Team SoloMid
Team	Score	Map	Score	Team
Team EnVyUs	16	Cache	12	Team SoloMid
Team EnVyUs	8	Dust II	16	Team SoloMid
Team EnVyUs	16	Inferno	9	Team SoloMid

==== Virtus.pro vs. Fnatic ====
Casters: Pansy, Machine, & Fifflaren

Virtus.pro vs. Fnatic
Team	Score	Map	Score	Team
Virtus.pro	16	Mirage	6	Fnatic
Virtus.pro	14	Inferno	16	Fnatic
Virtus.pro	7	Cobblestone	16	Fnatic

=== Finals ===
Casters: Deman, Anders Blume, & HenryG

With its third title, Fnatic would be the only team to win back-to-back majors and have multiple titles until SK Gaming, which won MLG Columbus 2016 and ESL One Cologne 2016. Flusha was named the most valuable player of Cologne 2015.

Team EnVyUs vs. Fnatic
Team	Score	Map	Score	Team
Team EnVyUs	15	Dust II	19	Fnatic
Team EnVyUs	7	Cobblestone	16	Fnatic
Team EnVyUs	–	Inferno	–	Fnatic

== Final standings ==
Place	Team	Prize Money	Seed for DreamHack Open Cluj-Napoca 2015	Roster	Coach
1st	Fnatic	US$100,000	Legends status	JW, flusha, pronax, olofmeister, KRiMZ	vuggo
2nd	Team EnVyUs	US$50,000	Legends status	kioShiMa, Happy, kennyS, NBK, apEX	–
3rd–4th	Team SoloMid	US$22,000	Legends status	karrigan, dev1ce, cajunb, dupreeh, Xyp9x	3k2
3rd–4th	Virtus.pro	US$22,000	Legends status	TaZ, NEO, pashaBiceps, byali, Snax	kuben
5–8th	Luminosity Gaming	US$10,000	Legends status	FalleN, fer, steel, coldzera, boltz	nak
5–8th	Natus Vincere	US$10,000	Legends status	Edward, Zeus, seized, flamie, GuardiaN	starix
5–8th	Ninjas in Pyjamas	US$10,000	Legends status	f0rest, GeT RiGhT, Xizt, friberg, allu	natu
5–8th	Team Kinguin	US$10,000	Legends status	Maikelele, dennis, fox, ScreaM, rain	LEGIJA
9–12th	Cloud9	US$2,000	Main qualifier invitation	Skadoodle, sgares, fREAKAZOiD, n0thing, shroud	–
9–12th	Counter Logic Gaming	US$2,000	Main qualifier invitation	hazed, reltuC, tarik, jdm64, FNS	–
9–12th	FlipSid3 Tactics	US$2,000	Main qualifier invitation	B1ad3, bondik, markeloff, WorldEdit, DavCost	Johnta
9–12th	Renegades	US$2,000	Main qualifier invitation	SPUNJ, Havoc, jks, AZR, Yam	–
13–16th	mousesports	US$2,000	Main qualifier invitation	nex, Spidii, denis, chrisJ, gob b	–
13–16th	Team eBettle	US$2,000	Main qualifier invitation	peet, GruBy, Hyper, rallen, Furlan	–
13–16th	Team Immunity	US$2,000	Main qualifier invitation	SnypeR, USTILO, Rickeh, James, emagine	–
13–16th	Titan	US$2,000	Main qualifier invitation	shox, Rpk, SmithZz, Maniac, Ex6TenZ	–
