= GeT RiGhT =

Swedish esports player (born 1990)

GeT_RiGhT
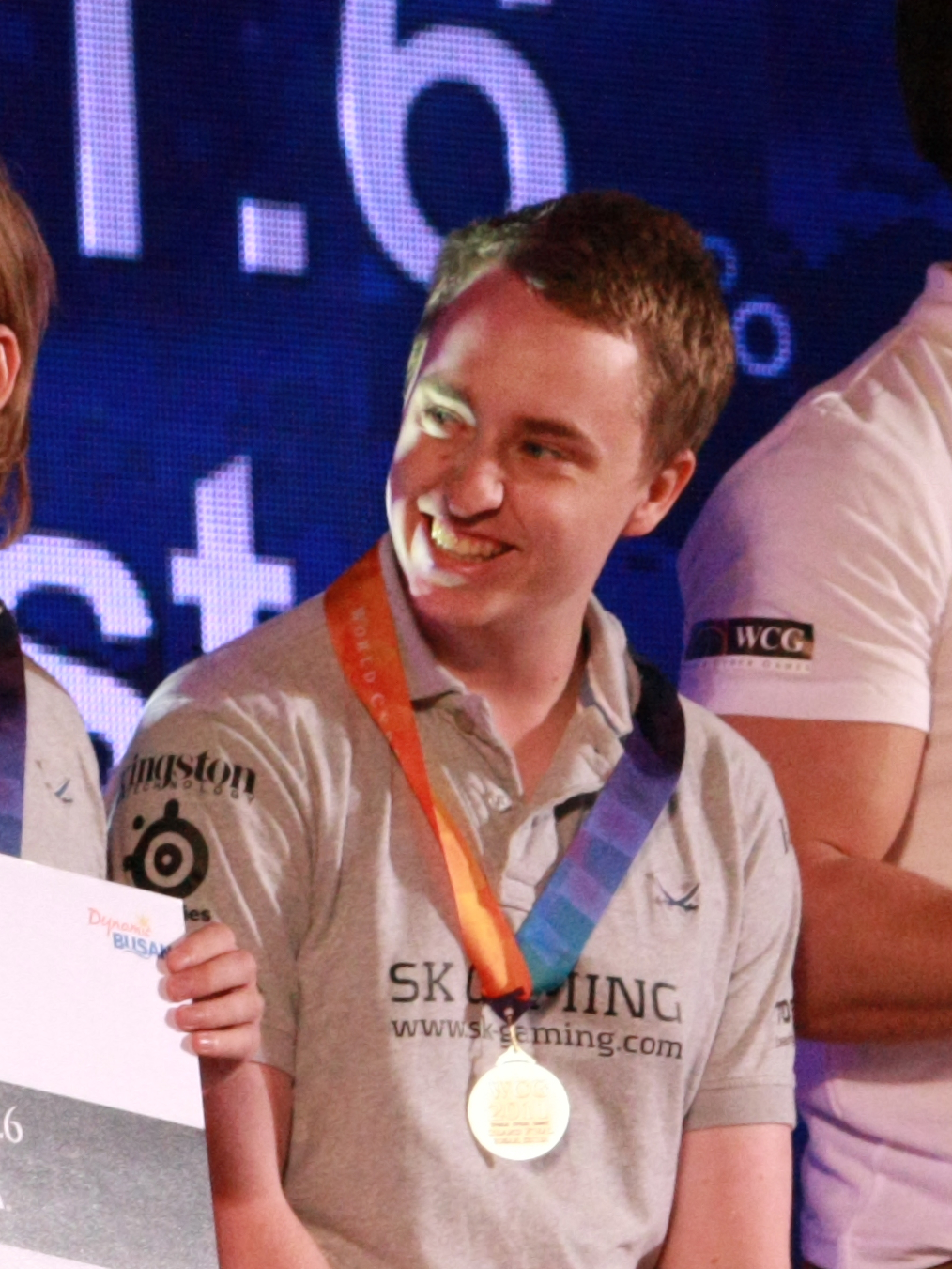
- Alesund at the World Cyber Games 2011 Finals

Personal information
- Name: Christopher Alesund
- Born: May 29, 1990 (age 36); Spånga, Stockholm, Sweden
- Nationality: Swedish

Career information
- Games: Counter-Strike; Counter-Strike: Global Offensive
- Playing career: 2007–2021
- Role: Rifler (lurker)

Team history
- 2007: Begrip Gaming
- 2009–2010: Fnatic
- 2010–2012: SK Gaming
- 2012–2019: Ninjas in Pyjamas
- 2020: Dignitas

Career highlights and awards
- CS:GO Major champion (Cologne 2014); 5x CS:GO Major finalist (2013–2015); 2x HLTV Player of the Year (2013, 2014); 2x HLTV Top 20 Player of the Year (2015, 2016); 10x HLTV MVP; HLTV Hall of Fame inductee (2025)

Christopher Carl Albin Alesund (born 29 May 1990), better known by his in-game name GeT_RiGhT, is a retired Swedish professional Counter-Strike player widely regarded as one of the greatest players in the history of the series. He began playing competitively in 2007 and is best known for his long tenure with Ninjas in Pyjamas (NiP), with whom he was part of the lineup that achieved an unprecedented 87–0 LAN map winning streak in 2012–13 and won the ESL One Cologne 2014 Major. HLTV ranked him the best player in the world in both 2013 and 2014. He is credited with popularizing the lurker role in competitive play and was inducted into the HLTV Hall of Fame in 2025.

== Early life ==
Christopher Carl Albin Alesund was born on 29 May 1990 in Spånga, Stockholm. Alesund was introduced to Counter-Strike 1.6 by his older brother Robin, which sparked his interest in competitive gaming.

== Career ==
=== Counter-Strike ===
Alesund entered the professional Counter-Strike 1.6 scene in 2007 at the age of 17, joining Begrip Gaming. The team placed 2nd at spiXelania 2007. Later that year, he joined SK Gaming, which placed 4th at the EM II Finals on 9 March 2008.

In early 2009, Alesund joined Fnatic, replacing Oskar "ins" Holm. The team won the WEG e-Stars 2009: King of the Game soon after. In March, Alesund won his first major, IEM Season III against the Polish super team MeetYourMakers. Fnatic then won KODE5 2009, WEG e-Stars 2009, IEM IV Dubai, and placed 2nd at IEM IV Chengdu. Alesund also won the European Nations Championship, representing the Swedish national team. They had second-place finish at World Cyber Games 2009, this time losing to the same Polish team of AGAiN. In December, they topped off the 2009 season with a victory at World e-Sports Masters 2009. Fnatic's 2009 had been the most successful for the organisation at the time. Alesund was then named e-Sports Player of the Year and Counter-Strike Player of the Year. In 2010, Fnatic weren't as successful, but continued to perform well, getting 2nd at the IEM IV European Championships, and IEM IV at the start of the year. After a very successful individual year, Alesund placed 2nd on HLTV's top 20 of 2010.

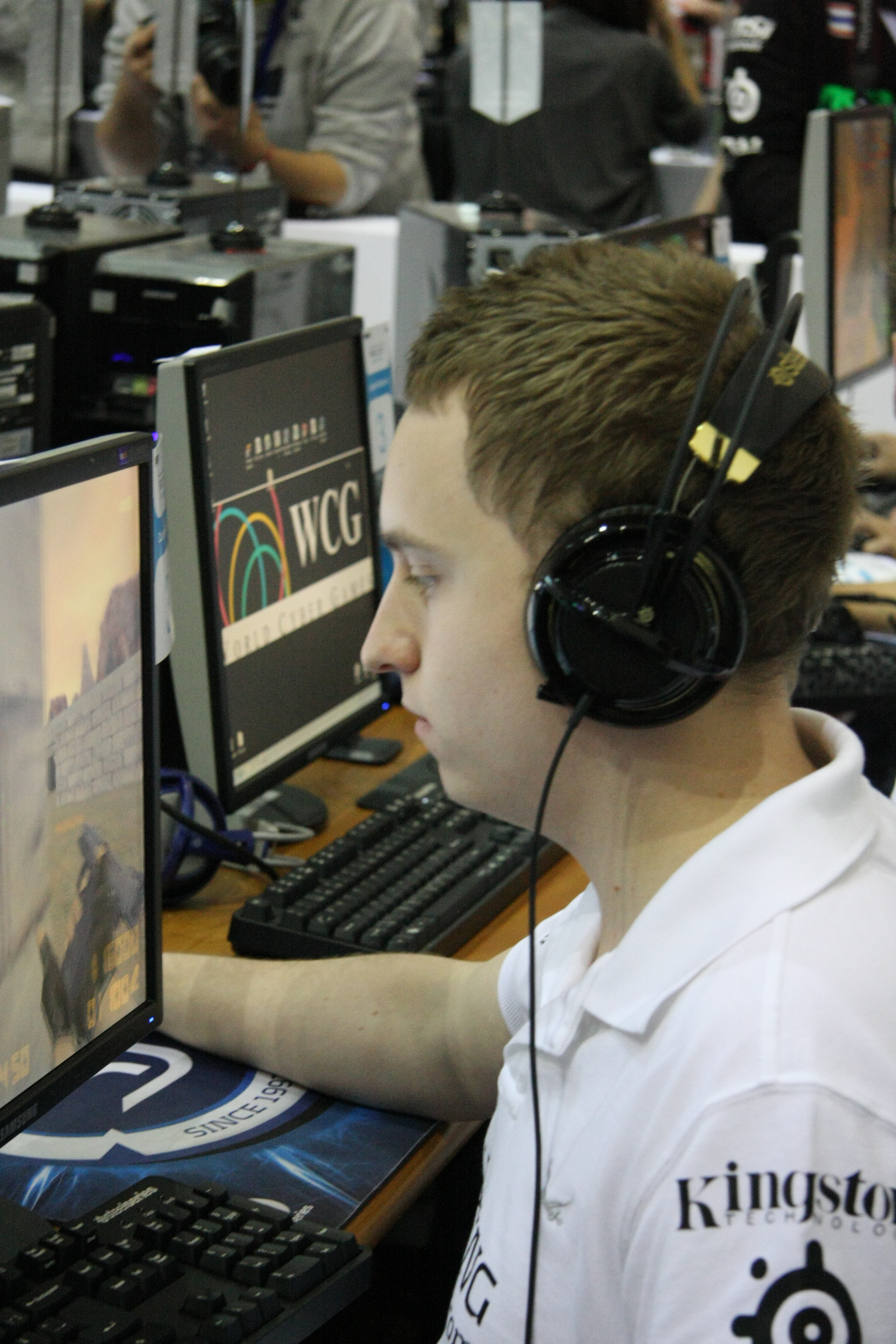
Alesund at World Cyber Games 2011

In 2011, Alesund started a third stint at SK Gaming, and was joined by Fnatic teammates Patrik "f0rest" Lindberg and Rasmus "Gux" Ståhl. After a few minor results, SK won DreamHack Summer 2011, with Alesund being selected as the MVP. SK continued to have some success, winning IEM6 6C New York and a Counter-Strike Major, ESWC 2011. Once again, Alesund was placed #2 on HLTV's top 20, this time for 2011.

=== Counter-Strike: Global Offensive ===
==== Ninjas in Pyjamas and the 87–0 streak (2012–2014) ====
In July 2012, in anticipation of switching Counter-Strike versions to Counter-Strike: Global Offensive, Alesund left SK Gaming and joined Ninjas in Pyjamas (NiP). He formed a roster alongside Richard "Xizt" Landström, Patrik "f0rest" Lindberg, Adam "friberg" Friberg, and Robin "Fifflaren" Johansson. This lineup achieved an unprecedented 87–0 LAN map winning streak from August 2012 to April 2013, during which they did not drop a single map across ten tournaments. The streak ended at StarSeries Season V finals in April 2013, where Virtus.pro became the first team to defeat them.

NiP won the ESL Major Series One 2013 spring tournament, defeating Fnatic 2–0. The pinnacle of this era came at ESL One Cologne 2014, where Alesund starred in NiP's 2–1 grand final victory over Fnatic on 17 August 2014, securing the organisation's sole CS:GO Major title. Alesund's consistent play and clutch performances during this period earned him recognition as the top player globally. HLTV.org rated him as the best player in the world in both 2013 and 2014.

==== Continued success and adaptation (2015–2018) ====
Following his peak years, Alesund continued to perform at a high level, though NiP faced increasing competition from emerging teams. In 2015, he was ranked 11th on HLTV's Top 20 players list. NiP and Alesund finished tied for 5th–8th at ESWC 2015. The next month, NiP finished 5th at ESL One Cologne 2015.

In 2016, Alesund overhauled his playstyle on the Terrorist side to adopt a much more aggressive role, which proved instrumental in NiP's resurgence. NiP won DreamHack Masters Malmö in April 2016, defeating Natus Vincere 2–0 in the grand final. He was ranked 18th on HLTV's Top 20 players list for 2016, marking his sixth consecutive appearance in the rankings. In November 2017, NiP defended their IEM Oakland title by defeating FaZe Clan 3–2 in the final.

==== Departure from NiP (2019) ====
In 2019, Alesund was reportedly set to be replaced after the StarLadder Major: Berlin 2019. Alesund officially stepped down from the roster in late September.

==== Dignitas and retirement (2020–2021) ====
On 21 January 2020, Alesund reunited with his former NiP teammates (f0rest, Xizt, Friberg and Fifflaren) in Dignitas. After a series of lackluster performances, Alesund was benched by Dignitas in September, with the organisation promising to assist with transitioning to the next phase of his career. In January 2021, Alesund announced that he was stepping away from professional competition and would become a content creator for Dignitas. He briefly returned to competitive play in September 2022, joining former NiP teammates f0rest and friberg in a team under the name d00m for a Regional Major Ranking qualifier.

== Playing style and legacy ==
Alesund is widely considered to be one of the greatest Counter-Strike players in both versions of the game. He is known for his highly consistency, success in high-pressure situations, and for popularizing the "Lurker" role in teams.

Alesund defined the lurker role as "someone who's taking care of the flanks when you're a Terrorist" and "someone who tries to see openings in the enemy's defense without taking big risks." His tactical approach emphasized passive positioning in obscure locations, gathering information for his team, and catching rotating defenders unaware. He has been considered "the best lurker in the history of CS:GO and Counter-Strike in general."

In 2025, Alesund was inducted into the inaugural class of the HLTV Hall of Fame alongside fellow Swedish legends f0rest, HeatoN, and Potti, with the induction ceremony taking place on 11 January 2025 in Belgrade, Serbia.

== Notable tournament results ==
Bold denotes a CS:GO Major

Game	Year	Place	Tournament	Team	Winning score	Opponent	Prize money
CS:GO	2014	1st	**ESL One: Cologne 2014**	Ninjas in Pyjamas	2–1	fnatic	$100,000.00
CS:GO	2014	2nd	**Dreamhack Winter 2014**	Ninjas in Pyjamas	1–2	LDLC	$50,000.00
CS:GO	2013	2nd	**Dreamhack Winter 2013**	Ninjas in Pyjamas	1–2	fnatic	$50,000.00
CS:GO	2017	1st	Intel Extreme Masters Season XII – Oakland	Ninjas in Pyjamas	3–2	FaZe Clan	$125,000.00
CS:GO	2016	1st	DreamHack Masters Malmö 2016	Ninjas in Pyjamas	2–0	Natus Vincere	$100,000.00
Counter-Strike	2009	1st	IEM Season III	Fnatic	16–13 (Bo1)	MeetYourMakers	$50,000.00
