= SmithZz =

French esports player

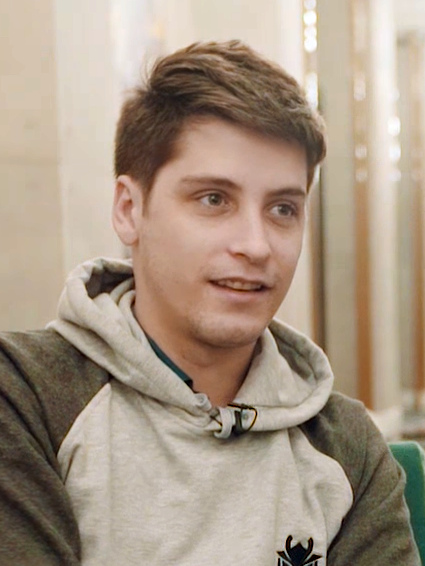
- Dubourdeaux in 2018

Personal information
- Name: Edouard Dubourdeaux
- Nationality: French

Career information
- Games: Counter-Strike: Source; Counter-Strike: Global Offensive
- Playing career: Until 2020
- Coaching career: 2017–2018

Team history

As player:
- 2012–2013: VeryGames
- 2014–2015: Titan
- 2015: Team EnVyUs
- 2016–2020: G2 Esports

As coach:
- 2017–2018: G2 Esports

Career highlights and awards
- CS:GO Major champion (Jönköping 2014); HLTV Top 20 Player of the Year (2013)

Edouard Dubourdeaux or SmithZz is a French former professional Counter-Strike: Global Offensive and former Counter-Strike: Source player.

== Career ==
SmithZz first joined VeryGames back in 2008 and went on to have great success in the Counter-Strike: Source scene through the years. With some on and off time in the French giants, he finally returned in August 2012 to replace Dan "apEX" Madesclaire, and complete the lineup that would around a month later together switch to Counter-Strike: Global Offensive.

He was voted the 17th best CS:GO player of 2013 by HLTV.org.

SmithZz previously joined G2.Kinguin (which later became G2 Esports) and has since then been moved into the coaching role in the '2017 French Shuffle.'

In the 2018 French Shuffle, he was reinstated into a playing role for HIFK Esports as part of Richard 'shox' Papillon's project.

On 26 November 2018, G2 Esports announced the signing of Lucky and JaCkz in replacement of SmithZz and his teammate Ex6tenZ

On 3 February 2020, SmithZz announced his retirement as a professional player and his transition to streaming.

== Tournament results ==
Bold denotes a CSGO Major

=== VeryGames ===
- 3-4th — **2013 DreamHack Counter-Strike: Global Offensive Championship**

=== Titan ===
- 9-12th — **EMS One Katowice 2014**

=== Team LDLC.com ===
- 1st — **DreamHack Winter 2014**

=== Team EnVyUs ===
- 3rd — **ESL One Katowice 2015**

=== Titan ===
- 9-12th — **ESL One Cologne 2014**
- 13-16th — **ESL One Cologne 2015**
- 9-12th — **DreamHack Open Cluj-Napoca 2015**

=== G2 Esports ===
- 9-12th — **MLG Major Championship: Columbus**
- 13-16th — **ESL One Cologne 2016**
- 11-14th — ELEAGUE Season 1
- 9-12th — ELEAGUE Season 2
- 12-14th — **ELEAGUE Major 2017**
