= Mouz =

German esports organisation

MOUZ
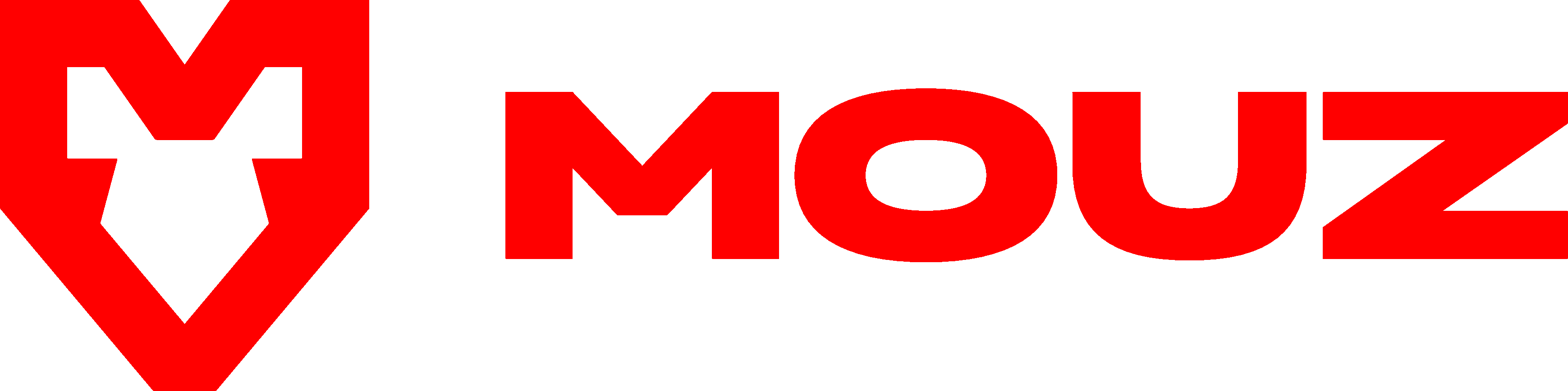
- Divisions: Counter-Strike 2 Valorant; StarCraft II: Legacy of the Void; Street Fighter V DOTA 2 Rennsport
- Founded: 2002
- Location: Hamburg, Germany
- Manager: Stefan Wendt
- Partners: RAZER; HanseMerkur; NITRADO; BMW M
- Website: www.mousesports.com

Mouz (stylized as MOUZ), formerly mousesports, is a professional esports organisation based in Germany. It fields teams in several games but is particularly known for its CS2 team. MOUZ was one of the founding members of the G7 Teams.

== History ==
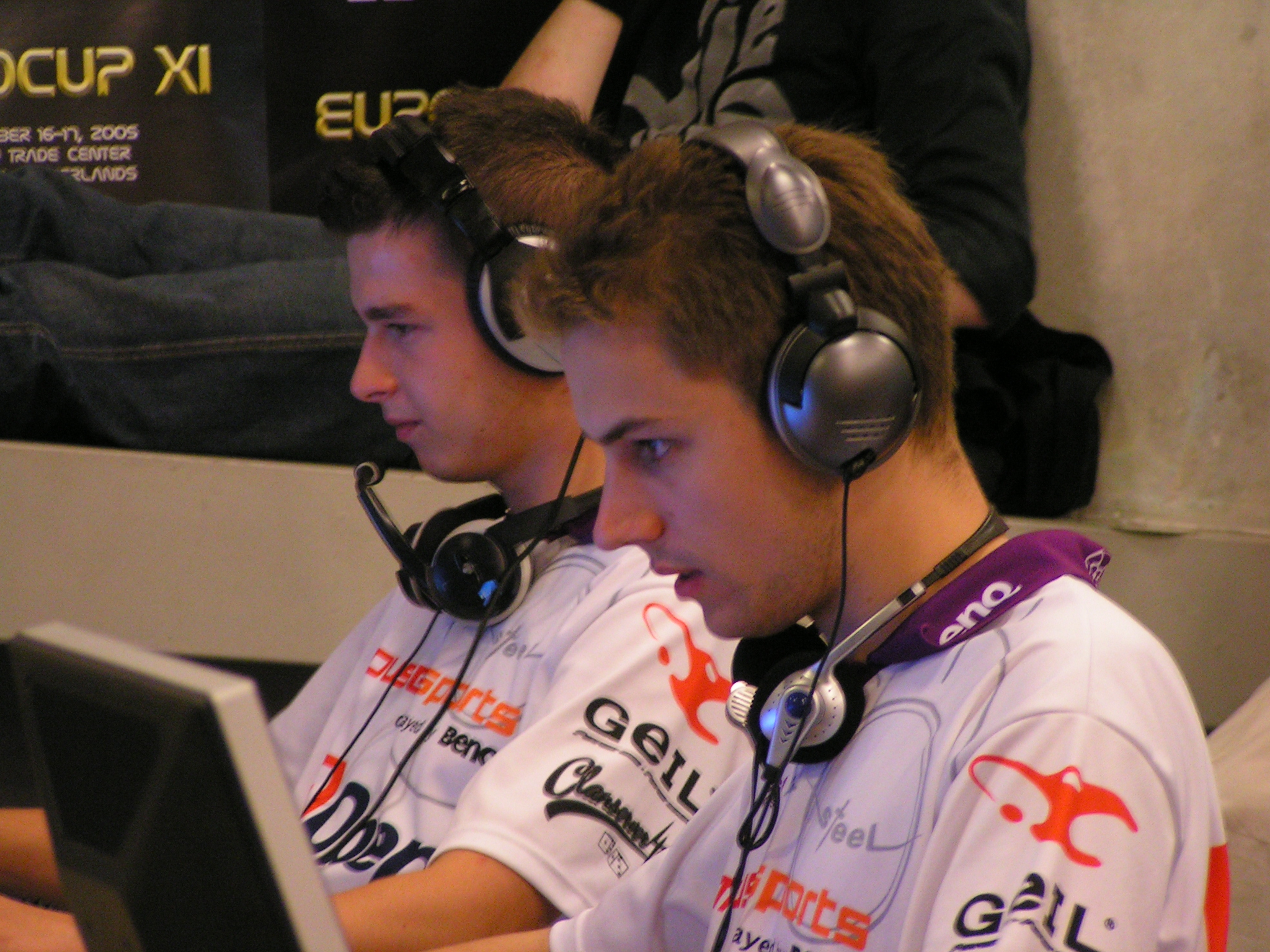
Mousesports Unreal Tournament players competing in a 2005 tournament

Mousesports was formed in 2002 in Berlin, Germany, as a Counter-Strike team. The team began to compete in small tournaments, which gradually led to their progression in larger ones, as well. By 2006, when G7 Teams was created, mousesports was one of the greatest gaming organisations in Europe, consisting of Counter-Strike, Warcraft III, Quake 4, Battlefield 1942 and Unreal Tournament divisions.

On 13 May 2007, mousesports announced that it had acquired Nihilum, the officially recognised premiere worldwide World of Warcraft organisation, with Nihilum recognised as a subsidiary of mousesports. The guild was remade into a community called "Nihilum: mousesports MMO". Nihilum was mousesports' consistently strongest gaming team in the European competition. However, the relations between mousesports and Nihilum grew uncertain in the fall of 2008 and finally, on 10 November, it was announced that the former PvE team of SK Gaming would be merging with the players of Nihilum, effectively ending the partnership that lasted for over a year and a half. Despite this, however, mousesports continued to maintain the Nihilum brand and on 1 August 2009, launched a new community website to connect the World of Warcraft guild Method, along with the WotLK Wiki and the Nihilum brand under a single domain.

In a quarter-final played on 19 June 2025, MOUZ eliminated defending Major champions Team Spirit in a dramatic 2–1 victory at the Blast Austin Major 2025, advancing to the semi-finals. On 20 April 2009, mousesports announced that it would be withdrawing its support for Defense of the Ancients despite the huge amount of success they were having. In early 2010, the organisation announced the addition of a star-studded StarCraft: Brood War roster, which originally consisted of several American, Canadian, German, Polish and Ukrainian players. Since their original induction into the organisation, the team completely switched focus to StarCraft II during the Wings of Liberty beta period and has since become one of the greatest-renowned teams. In one of the greatest-known tragedies in electronic sports history, mouz Counter-Strike player Antonio "cyx" Daniloski died on 29 July 2010 in a car accident caused by tire failure after missing a flight to China to compete for his team. The aftermath of his death featured numerous memorials, tributes, eulogies and a permanent dedication on the official mousesports website. Several months following Daniloski's death, mousesports announced the retirement of remaining Counter-Strike players Fatih "gob b" Dayik, Navid "Kapio" Javadi and stand-in Christian "Blizzard" Chmiel, effective following the ESL Pro Series Season XVII Finals.

In March 2012, mousesports announced that it would be ending its support of its Counter-Strike division, citing the organisation's perception of the lack of market, considering the rising prominence of Dota 2 and League of Legends. Mouz picked up a new Counter-Strike: Global Offensive roster later that year.

In April 2017, mousesports signed the roster of the former Dota 2 team, Ad Finem, marking the first return for the organisation to the game in nearly two years.

On 2 August, Christian 'loWel' Garcia was released from his contract with mousesports. On 4 August former Penta Sports player Miikka 'suNny' Kemppi was announced as his replacement. Less than a week later, on 8 August, mousesports released Denis 'denis' Howell from his contract and signed Martin 'STYKO' Styk to replace him, formerly of HellRaisers.

In December 2017, the mousesports Dota 2 team disbanded.

In March 2018, mousesports signed their first full roster for competition in Tom Clancy's Rainbow Six Siege.

On 27 June, mousesports announced the acquisition of Janusz "Snax" Pogorzelski from Virtus.pro as a replacement for the benched Martin "STYKO" Styk.

On 30 July, mousesports announced that they were acquiring the Rocket League team of Tigreee, Alex161, and Skyline. Alex161 and Skyline previously played under Servette Esports, with Tigreee being acquired from Team Secret. This Mousesports team began play in RLCS Season 6, as Alex161 and Skyline retained their qualified spot won under Servette.

On 15 October, mousesports announced the return of Martin "STYKO" Styk to the starting line-up.

On 15 November, the coach of the Tom Clancy's Rainbow Six Siege team announced the team was dropped by mousesports and he would not stay with the team.

On 10 January 2019, mousesports announced the acquisition of Linus "al0t" Möllergren from compLexity Gaming, replacing Skyline.

On 13 February 2019, mousesports announced the signing of their second Tom Clancy's Rainbow Six Siege team, the former ENCE esports Tom Clancy's Rainbow Six Siege roster, as well as coach Michiel "oVie" van Dartel but later dropped the team on 1 July 2019.

On 14 March, mousesports revamps their roster with the acquisition of woxic, frozen, and karrigan. While oskar is released, suNny and STYKO is benched from the line-up.

On 22 June 2020, mousesports announced their withdrawal from the RLCS and competitive Rocket League as a whole and released their roster.

In March 2024, MOUZ returned to Dota 2 by upsetting The International 2023 champions Team Spirit 1–0 in the opening day of the 1win Series Dota 2 Spring group stage.

On 17 December 2024, MOUZ announced their withdrawal from the League of Legends scene, MOUZ's League of Legends team recently competed in the ESL Pro Series, having formerly competed in the European Challenger Series.

== Roster ==
=== Counter-Strike 2 ===
MOUZ Counter-Strike 2 roster
Players
Coaches

Handle	Name	Nationality
torzsi	Torzsás, Ádám	Hungary
xertioN	Berman, Dorian	Israel
Spinx	Giladi, Lotan	Israel
xelex	Vincze, Adrian	Hungary
PR	Nový, Oldřich	Czech Republic

Head coach

Dennis "sycrone" Nielsen

Assistant coach(es)

Andreas "Xyp9x" Højsleth

Legend:
- (I) Inactive
- (S) Suspended
- Substitute
- (injured) Injury / Illness

Latest roster transaction: 7 July 2026.

=== DOTA 2 ===
MOUZ DOTA 2 roster
Players
Coaches

Handle	Name	Nationality
Crystallis	Arets, Remco	Netherlands
Yamich	Lazebnyy, Daniyal	Russia
BOOM	Bičan, Miroslav	Czech Republic
MidOne	Zheng, Yeik Nai	Malaysia
Panto	Balaganin, Nikita	Belarus

Head coach

Daniel "ImmortalFaith" Moza

Legend:
- (I) Inactive
- (S) Suspended
- Substitute
- (injured) Injury / Illness

Latest roster transaction: 18 May 2026.

== Tournament results ==
=== Counter-Strike ===
- 3rd — World Cyber Games 2002
- 3rd — CPL Europe Cannes 2002
- 3rd — CPL Europe Copenhagen 2002
- 3rd — CPL Winter 2003
- 5–8th — ESWC 2004
- 7th — CPL Summer 2004
- 3rd — World e-Sports Games Season 1
- 1st — CPL Spain 2005
- 3rd — ESWC 2005
- 5th — Intel Summer Championship 2006
- 5–6th — IEM Season I World Championship
- 4th — WSVG Louisville 2007
- 1st — IEM Season II World Championship
- 3rd — ESWC Masters of Paris
- 4th — ESWC 2008
- 1st — IEM Season III Global Challenge Dubai
- 2nd — World e-Sports Masters 2008
- 3rd — ESWC Masters of Cheonan
- 1st — GameGune 2009
- 1st — IEM Season IV Global Challenge Gamescon
- 1st — IEM Season IV European Championship
- 2nd — Arbalet Cup Dallas 2010
- 5–8th — Copenhagen Games 2011
- 5–6th — World e-Sports Games: e-Stars Seoul 2011
- 2nd — IEM Season VI Global Challenge Guangzhou
- 3rd — ESWC 2011
- 4th — DreamHack Winter 2011

=== Counter-Strike: Global Offensive ===
==== 2012 ====
- 3rd–4th — Sound Blaster CS:GO Challenge
- 3rd–4th — DreamHack Winter 2012

==== 2014 ====
- 13–16th — EMS One Katowice 2014
- 5–8th — Gfinity G3
- 7–8th — ESEA S17 LAN
- 4th — Acer A-Split Invitational

==== 2015 ====
- 4th — ESEA S18 LAN
- 3rd–4th — Gfinity Summer Masters I
- 3rd–4th — CEVO S7 LAN
- 2nd — Acer Predator Masters Season 1
- 4th — IEM Season X Gamescom
- 13–16th — ESL One Cologne 2015
- 9–12th — DreamHack Open Cluj-Napoca 2015
- 2nd — CEVO S8 LAN

==== 2016 ====
- 1st — Acer Predator Masters Season 2
- 7–8th — IEM Season X World Championship
- 9–12th — MLG Major Championship: Columbus
- 5–8th — DreamHack Masters Malmö 2016
- 9–12th — ESL One Cologne 2016
- 3rd–4th — ELeague Season 1
- 3rd–4th — ESL Pro League Season 4 Finals

==== 2017 ====
- 12–14th — ELEAGUE Major 2017
- 5–8th — DreamHack Masters Las Vegas 2017
- 12–14th — PGL Major Kraków 2017
- 1st — ESG Tour: Mykonos, 2017
- 3rd–4th — DreamHack Open Denver 2017
- 2nd — ECS Season 4 Finals

==== 2018 ====
- 5–8th — ELEAGUE Major: Boston 2018
- 1st — StarLadder Starseries & iLeague Season 4
- 1st — V4 Future Sports Festival
- 3rd–4th — StarSeries i-League Season 5
- 5–6th — ESL Pro League Season 7
- 15–16th — FACEIT Major: London 2018
- 1st — ESL One New York 2018

==== 2019 ====
- 1st — Dreamhack Open Tours 2019
- 3rd–4th — ESL Pro League Season 9 Finals
- 9–11th — StarLadder Major: Berlin 2019
- 1st — CS:GO Asia Championships
- 1st — ESL Pro League Season 10 Finals
- 1st — CS_Summit 5
- 2nd — EPICENTER 2019

==== 2020 ====
- 1st — ICE Challenge 2020.
- 2nd — ESL Pro League Season 11
- 1st–2nd — BLAST Premier Fall 2020 Showdown
- 2nd — Dreamhack Masters Winter 2020 Europe
- 7th–8th — BLAST Premier Fall 2020

==== 2021 ====
- 3rd–4th — cs_summit 7
- 1st — Flashpoint Season 3 (RMR)
- 12th–14th — PGL Major Stockholm 2021

==== 2022 ====
- 2nd — Global Esports Tour Dubai 2022
- 3rd–4th — IEM Rio Major 2022

==== 2023 ====
- 13th–16th — IEM Katowice 2023
- 5th–8th — ESL Pro League Season 17
- 13th–16th — IEM Rio 2023
- 3rd–4th — Elisa Invitational Spring 2023
- 23rd–24th — BLAST.tv Paris Major 2023
- 2nd — IEM Dallas 2023
- 1st — ESL Pro League Season 18

=== Counter-Strike 2 ===
==== 2023 ====
- 3-4th — IEM Sydney 2023
- 1st — ESL Pro League Season 18

==== 2024 ====
- 1st — ESL Pro League Season 19

==== 2025 ====
- 1st — PGL Cluj-Napoca 2025
- 2nd — ESL Pro League Season 21
- 2nd — Blast Open Lisbon 2025
- 3-4th — IEM Melbourne 2025
- 3-4th — BLAST Rivals Spring 2025
- 2nd — Intel Extreme Masters Dallas 2025
- 3-4th — BLAST.tv Austin Major 2025
- 2nd — IEM Cologne 2025

==== 2026 ====
- 1st — IEM Beijing 2026, defeating The MongolZ 3–0 in the final without losing a map throughout the tournament.
