= LDLC OL =

French esports organization

- Divisions: Counter-Strike: Global Offensive; Fortnite Battle Royale; League of Legends; PlayerUnknown's Battlegrounds; World Rally Championship
- Founded: 1 August 2010
- Folded: July 2023
- Based in: Lyon
- Location: France
- Manager: Stéphan "Umibozu" Euthine

LDLC OL was a French esports organization best known for its teams in Counter-Strike. The organization also sponsored teams in Fortnite Battle Royale, League of Legends, PlayerUnknown's Battlegrounds and World Rally Championship.

Originally known as Team LDLC.com, it was named after a French company. On 7 January 2020, Team LDLC officially renamed to LDLC OL, following an announcement of partnership with the French football club Olympique Lyonnais. On 16 May 2023, LDLC announced the end of the partnership with Olympique Lyonnais and the cessation of all esports operations at the end of July 2023.

== History ==
=== Counter-Strike: Global Offensive ===
LDLC placed 5–8th at the CS:GO Major EMS One Katowice 2014. They later won the CS:GO Major DreamHack Winter 2014 in November. Team LDLC's Counter-Strike team won the X Games CS:GO tournament in January 2015. On 2 February, LDLC's roster left the team and was acquired by Team EnVyUs.

On 27 February, the team announced that it had signed the former Awsomiac squad whose players were Kevin "madc" Ducourtioux, Charbel "BouLy" Naoum, David "HEdm" Thalien, Guillame "XpG" Veron, and Julien "PetitSkel" Marcantoni.

Shortly after competing at ESL One Cologne 2014 as a player for Team LDLC, Hovik "KQLY" Tovmassian received a Valve Anti-Cheat ban for Counter-Strike: Global Offensive, permanently restricting his account from playing. The ban's timing caused speculation among followers of the game's professional play that cheating software influenced his performance at the tournament. Tovmassian took an opportunity shortly after the incident to state he had not cheated during any LAN tournaments.

In March 2015, LDLC signed the Platinum Esports roster as a second CS:GO team, dubbed LDLC Blue.

In November 2017, Team LDLC won the ESWC 2017 at the Paris Games Week after already winning in 2015.

=== Rally games ===
LDLC signed Nexl, who was a multi-time champion in World Rally Championship.

Awards and achievements
Preceded by ESL One Cologne 2014; Ninjas in Pyjamas	DreamHack Winter 2014 winner 2014	Succeeded by ESL One Katowice 2015; Fnatic
