= ESL Pro League Season 1 =

Counter-Strike: Global Offensive tournament

ESL Pro League
- 2015

Tournament information
- Sport: Counter-Strike: Global Offensive
- Location: Cologne, Germany
- Dates: May 4, 2015–July 5, 2015
- Administrator: Electronic Sports League (ESL)
- Teams: 24 teams
- Purse: US$500,000 for Finals

Final positions
- Champions: Fnatic
- 1st runners-up: Cloud9
- 2nd runners-up: Counter Logic Gaming; Virtus.pro

ESL Pro League Season 1, officially known as ESL ESEA Pro League Season 1 and shortened as EPL Season 1, was an Electronic Sports League (ESL) Counter-Strike: Global Offensive tournament. It was the first season of the ESL Pro League. The Finals took place in Cologne, Germany from July 2, 2015, to July 5, 2015. Teams from two continents, North America and Europe, competed in twelve team leagues and play against each other twice to determine the top four teams from each continent would play in the Finals.

The regular season for Europe began on May 4, 2015, with Team Dignitas beating Titan and ended on June 24, 2015, with the same two teams with the same result. North America's season began on the same date and kicked off with Luminosity Gaming defeating Method and ended with Method defeating mouseSpaz. The season officially concluded with Fnatic defeating Cloud9 in a close best of five finals, 3–1.

== Format ==
On April 28, 2015, ESL announced a joint venture with ESEA to provide a Counter-Strike: Global Offensive league with US$1,000,000 in total prize money in 2015. ESL invited twelve teams to each league to participate in its professional league. Each team would face off against every other team twice to play in twenty-two games throughout the eight week season. The top four teams from each continent would move on to the finals in Germany and would be automatically invited to the next season. Teams that placed fifth to ninth would not qualify for the finals, but would still be invited to Season 2. Teams that placed tenth and eleventh would have to play in a relegation phase, in which those teams and teams that placed second and third in ESEA Season 19's Premier League, the league under the Pro League, would face off to qualify for two spots in next season's Pro League. The team that placed first in the Premier League would qualify for Season 2. The team that placed twelfth in the Pro League would automatically be demoted to the Premier League.

The finals consisted of eight teams, four from Europe and four from North America. The teams would be placed in two groups and play in a four team, double elimination GSL group stage. In each group, the highest seed played against the lowest seed and then the other two teams would play a best of one game. Then, the winners would play against each other to determine which team takes the top spot. The losers would fight it out to determine which team goes home. The top seed would earn an automatic berth to the semifinals. The playoffs consisted of six teams. The loser of the winners' match and the winner of the losers' match in the group stage would face off against each other in the Round of 6 in a best of three. The winners of those matches went on to face the opposite group stage winner, such that the top seed of Group A would face off against the runner-up of Group B, and vice versa. The winners of those matches would move on to the finals in a best of five series.

== Teams ==
North America

- ACE Gaming
- affiNity
- Cloud9
- Counter Logic Gaming
- eLevate
- Keyd Stars
- Luminosity Gaming
- Method
- mouseSpaz
- Nihilum Gaming
- Team Liquid
- Tempo Storm

Europe

- FlipSid3 Tactics
- Fnatic
- HellRaisers
- mousesports
- Natus Vincere
- Ninjas in Pyjamas
- PENTA Sports
- Team Dignitas
- Team EnVyUs
- Team SoloMid
- Titan
- Virtus.pro

== North America ==
=== Final standings ===
Final Standings
Place	Prize Money	Team	W-L	RF-RA	RD	Pts	Roster	Coach
1st	US$18,000	Cloud9	19–3	334–214	+120	57	fREAKAZOiD, n0thing, seang@res, Skadoodle, shroud	GBJame^s
2nd	US$16,500	Keyd Stars	17–5	347–272	+75	51	boltz, FalleN, fer, steel, zqk	
3rd	US$15,000	Luminosity Gaming	16–6	345–257	+88	48	anger, LeX, ptr, NAF, pyth	
4th	US$13,500	Counter Logic Gaming	14–8	333–253	+80	42	hazed, jdm64, reltuC, tarik, FNS	
5th	US$13,000	Team Liquid	14–8	311–245	+66	42	adreN, ELiGE, flowsicK, FugLy, nitr0	dmode
6th	US$11,500	Nihilum Gaming	13–9	292–293	−1	39	autimatic, Hiko, sancz, valens, Semphis	LEGIJA
7th	US$10,000	eLevate	11–11	311–291	+20	33	Professor_Chaos, roca, RUSH, Storm, Xp3	
8th	US$8,500	Tempo Storm	10–12	272–277	−5	30	glorinsz, hades, stanislaw, ryx, ShahZaM	
9th	US$7,000	affiNity	8–14	260–293	−33	24	abE, arya, focs, DAVEY, jasonR	
10th	US$5,500	Method	6–16	256–316	−60	18	Eley, just9n, MAiNLiNE, SileNt3m, streboR	
11th	US$4,000	mouseSpaz	2–20	186–342	−156	6	dmize, impsta, pauLy, zecK, fruit	
12th	US$2,500	ACE Gaming	2–20	145–345	−200	6	Grt, PEX, vEz, decipLe, Maxaki	

== Europe ==
Final Standings
Place	Prize Money	Team	W-L	RF-RA	RD	Pts	Roster	Coach
1st	US$18,000	Fnatic	17–5	325–179	+146	51	flusha, KRiMZ, JW, olofmeister, pronax	vuggo
2nd	US$16,500	Virtus.pro	17–5	329–251	+78	51	byali, NEO, pashaBiceps, Snax, TaZ	kuben
3rd	US$15,000	Team SoloMid	16–6	319–248	+71	48	cajunb, dev1ce, dupreeh, karrigan, Xyp9x	3k2
4th	US$13,500	Team EnVyUs	16–6	312–215	+97	48	Happy, kioShiMa, NBK-, shox, SmithZz	
5th	US$13,000	Ninjas in Pyjamas	14–8	292–261	+31	42	f0rest, friberg, GeT RiGhT, Xizt, allu	natu
6th	US$11,500	HellRaisers	12–10	317–297	+20	36	ANGE1, AdreN, Dosia, kUcheR, mous	lmbt
7th	US$10,000	Natus Vincere	11–11	300–268	+32	33	Edward, flamie, GuardiaN, seized, Zeus	starix
8th	US$8,500	Team Dignitas	9–13	247–282	−35	27	aizy, Kjaerbye, MSL, Nico, Pimp	
9th	US$7,000	Titan	12–10	270–294	−24	36	Rpk, shox, SmithZz, Ex6TenZ, ScreaM	
10th	US$5,500	mousesports	9–13	262–294	−44	21	denis, gob b, nex, Spiidi, chrisJ	
11th	US$4,000	PENTA Sports	2–20	166–340	−174	6	kRYSTAL, strux1, tabseN, Troubley, stavros	
12th	US$2,500	FlipSid3 Tactics	2–20	154–330	−176	6	B1ad3, bondik, DavCost, markeloff, WorldEdit	Johnta

== Finals ==
The finalized teams are shown below.

North America

- Cloud9
- Keyd Stars
- Luminosity Gaming
- Counter Logic Gaming

Europe

- Fnatic
- Virtus.pro
- Team SoloMid
- Team EnVyUs

=== Broadcast Talent ===
Host

- Alex "Machine" Richardson

Commentators

- Anders Blume
- Jason "JKaplan" Kaplan
- Auguste "Semmler" Massonnat
- John "BLU" Mullen
- Lauren "Pansy" Scott
- Leigh "Deman" Smith

Analysts

- Jonatan "Devilwalk" Lundberg
- Joona "natu" Leppänen
- Jason "moses" O'Toole

Observers

- Janko "YNk" Paunović
- Simon "pAn" Schumacher

=== Group stage ===
==== Group A ====
Pos	Team	W	L	RF	RA	RD	Pts
1	Virtus.pro	2	0	32	14	+18	6
2	Cloud9	1	1	26	29	−3	3
3	Team EnVyUs	1	1	29	23	+6	3
4	Luminosity Gaming	0	2	43	76	−33	0

Group A Matches
Team	Score	Map	Score	Team
Virtus.pro	16	Cobblestone	4	Luminosity Gaming
Cloud9	16	Cache	13	Team EnVyUs
Cloud9	10	Overpass	16	Virtus.pro
Luminosity Gaming	7	Dust II	16	Team EnVyUs

==== Group B ====
Pos	Team	W	L	RF	RA	RD	Pts
1	Counter Logic Gaming	2	0	32	21	+11	6
2	Keyd Stars	1	1	25	28	−3	3
3	Fnatic	1	1	29	30	−2	3
4	Team SoloMid	0	2	26	32	−6	0

Group B Matches
Team	Score	Map	Score	Team
Fnatic	12	Mirage	16	Counter Logic Gaming
Keyd Stars	16	Inferno	12	Team SoloMid
Keyd Stars	9	Cache	16	Counter Logic Gaming
Fnatic	16	Overpass	12	Team SoloMid

Round of 6
A2	Cloud9	2
A3	Team EnVyUs	0
B2	Keyd Stars	0
B3	Fnatic	2

Semifinals
B1	Counter Logic G.	0
A2	Cloud9	2
A1	Virtus.pro	1
B3	Fnatic	2

Finals
A2	Cloud9	1
B3	Fnatic	3

==== Round of 6 ====
Round of 6
Team	Score	Map	Score	Team
Cloud9	16	Dust II	12	Team EnVyUs
Cloud9	16	Cache	12	Team EnVyUs
Cloud9	–	Train	–	Team EnVyUs
Keyd Stars	5	Inferno	16	Fnatic
Keyd Stars	16	Train	19	Fnatic
Keyd Stars	–	Dust II	–	Fnatic

==== Semifinals ====
Semifinals
Team	Score	Map	Score	Team
Counter Logic Gaming	5	Cache	16	Cloud9
Counter Logic Gaming	8	Dust II	16	Cloud9
Counter Logic Gaming	–	Overpass	–	Cloud9
Virtus.pro	16	Cache	12	Fnatic
Virtus.pro	3	Train	16	Fnatic
Virtus.pro	9	Dust II	16	Fnatic

==== Finals ====
Finals
Team	Score	Map	Score	Team
Cloud9	16	Cobblestone	14	Fnatic
Cloud9	6	Cache	16	Fnatic
Cloud9	14	Overpass	16	Fnatic
Cloud9	15	Dust II	19	Fnatic
Cloud9	–	Inferno	–	Fnatic
