= ESL Pro League Season 8 =

2018 Counter-Strike: Global Offensive tournament

ESL Pro League
- 2018

Tournament information
- Sport: Counter-Strike: Global Offensive
- Location: Odense, Denmark
- Dates: September 26, 2018–December 9, 2018
- Administrator: Electronic Sports League (ESL)
- Venue: Sparekassen Fyn Arena
- Teams: 54 teams
- Purse: ~US$1,004,686.63

Final positions
- Champions: Astralis
- 1st runners-up: Team Liquid
- 2nd runners-up: MIBR mousesports
- MVP: Nicolai "dev1ce" Reedtz

ESL Pro League Season 8 (shortened as EPL Season 8) is a Counter-Strike: Global Offensive tournament run by ESL. It is the eighth season of the ESL Pro League. Teams from five continents, North America, Europe, Asia, Australia, and South America, will compete in six leagues to attempt to qualify for the Finals. The EPL finals returned to Odense, Denmark. The regular season started on September 26, 2018, and will end on November 14, 2018. China's season started with ViCi Gaming upsetting TyLoo in a best of three series. Southeast Asia's season started with B.O.O.T-dream[S]cape taking down Recca Esports, which included a 16–0 map. Europe's season started with Space Soldiers defeating Ninjas in Pyjamas and ended with HellRaisers defeating G2 Esports. North America's season kicked off with Renegades dominating eUnited and ended with eUnited defeating Luminosity Gaming.

The finals started on December 4, 2018, and ended on December 9, 2018. In the finals Astralis defeated Team Liquid in four maps in a five-game series to take home a second straight EPL title.

This tournament is the ninth tournament of the first season of the Intel Grand Slam, which is a list of premier tournaments run by ESL and DreamHack. The first team to win four titles would earn an extra $1,000,000. Astralis claimed this title after winning DreamHack Masters Marseille 2018, ESL Pro League Season 7, Intel Extreme Masters Season XIII – Chicago, and this event.

== Format ==
The eighth season saw used the same format as the seventh season. ESL announced on February 20, 2018, that the EPL Finals would be expanded to 16 teams. On March 5, 2018, EPL announced the creation of the Asia-Pacific (APAC) division, which would divide teams up into three regions and then feature eight teams in an APAC regional. The eighth season would split up this region into three leagues, which includes China (effectively East Asia), Southeast Asia, and Oceania. EPL later announced on March 15, 2018, that a South American division, called the LA LEAGUE, would be created and would feature eight teams from a sixteen team closed qualifier.

North America and Europe featured the top 9 and 11 teams, respectively from last season's ESL Pro League Season 6, one team from the ESEA Season 27: Premier Finals and two teams from the Season 7 Relegation, which featured the bottom two teams from each league from Season 7 and the two runner-ups from the ESEA Season 27: Premier Finals. The China, Southeast Asia, and India regions were grouped into the Asia group; China and Southeast Asia had 8 teams each and India had twelve teams. The Oceania region featured eight teams. Seven teams from Europe, six teams from North America, one team from Asia, one team from Oceania, and one team from South America will make up the sixteen teams in the Finals.

During the regular season for North America and Europe, each team will play every team in its league in two best-of-ones. The winner of each game will receive three points and the loser of each game will receive zero points. If a game ends to overtime, the winner will receive two points and the loser will receive one point. The top six teams in North America and the top seven teams in Europe by the end of the season from each region will head to the Finals. Teams that placed seventh through ninth in North America and eighth through eleventh in Europe will not head to the playoffs but will secure a spot in next season's EPL. Teams that came in last will automatically be demoted to the Premier Division. The next two bottom teams will go through a relegation phase, in which those teams will be placed in a four team double elimination bracket, along with teams that placed second and third in the ESEA Season 27: Premier Division of their region. The top two teams move on to EPL Season 8. The winner of ESEA Season 27: Premier Division will automatically be invited to EPL Season 8. It would later be announced the Europe's league would feature sixteen teams next season, so Ninjas in Pyjamas and Fnatic would be safe from relegation and be invited next season.

There were also periods in which no matches were played. After week 1, no matches were played for one week due to StarSeries & i-League CS:GO Season 6 in Ukraine featuring six EPL teams. After a hefty week 2, no matches were played with EPICENTER 2018 featuring four EPL teams. After week 3, no matches were played twelve days due to BLAST Pro Series: Copenhagen 2018 from November 2 to 3 featuring six EPL teams, cs_summit 3 from November 1 to 4 featuring six EPL teams, and Intel Extreme Masters Season XIII – Chicago from November 6 to 11 featuring fourteen EPL teams.

The Finals will feature sixteen teams. Teams will be split into two groups and placed in an eight team, double elimination bracket. The top three teams from each group will move on to the playoffs. The winners of the groups will earn a bye to the semifinals and the other four teams will play in the quarterfinals. Teams play until a winner is decided.

== Qualifiers ==
=== Season 7 relegation ===
Before each season, three spots need to be filled up in each league. The team that came in last place in each league is automatically relegated to the Premier division for the following season, season 27. Meanwhile, the winner of the Premier division's season 26 is automatically promoted to the professional division. For the last two spots, the two runner ups of season 27 of the Premier division will be placed in a four team, best of three, double elimination bracket against the teams that placed twelfth and thirteenth in EPL Season 6. The final two teams are promoted to EPL Season 8 and the other two teams are demoted to ESEA Premier Division Season 28.

==== North America relegation ====
Season 7 Relegation

- compLexity Gaming (Season 7 #10)
- ex-Splyce (Season 7 #11)
- Swole Patrol (ESEA Season 27 #2)
- Torqued (ESEA Season 27 #3)

Upper round 1
1	compLexity G.	2
4	Torqued	0
2	ex-Splyce	2
3	Swole Patrol	0
Lower round 1
4	Torqued	0
3	Swole Patrol	2

Upper final
1	compLexity G.	2
2	ex-Splyce	0
Lower final
2	ex-Splyce	2
3	Swole Patrol	1

Qualified
1	compLexity G.
2	ex-Splyce

==== Europe relegation ====
Season 7 Relegation

- Team EnVyUs (Season 7 #12)
- AGO Esports (Season 7 #13)
- Windigo Gaming (ESEA Season 27 #2)
- Team Spirit (ESEA Season 27 #3)

Upper round 1
1	Team EnVyUs	2
4	Team Spirit	1
2	AGO Esports	2
3	Windigo Gaming	1
Lower round 1
4	Team Spirit	0
3	Windigo Gam.	2

Upper final
1	Team EnVyUs	0
2	AGO Esports	2
Lower final
1	Team EnVyUs	1
3	Windigo Gam.	2

Qualified
2	AGO Esports
3	Windigo Gam.

== Teams ==
North America

- Team Liquid (Season 7 #1)
- NRG eSports (Season 7 #2)
- Cloud9 (Season 7 #4)
- Renegades (Season 7 #5)
- Rogue (Season 7 #7)
- Luminosity Gaming (Season 7 #8)
- Ghost Gaming (Season 7 #9)
- MIBR (Note: OpTic Gaming decide to move to Europe's league, putting OpTic Gaming into Europe's Premier Division. ESL decide to give OpTic's spot to MIBR.)
- INTZ eSports (Note: INTZ eSports acquires SK Gaming's spot as SK was unable to field a team in time for the season.)
- eUnited (ESEA Premier Season 27)
- compLexity Gaming (Season 7 Relegation)
- Team EnVyUs (Note: Splyce's EPL slot is taken by Team EnVyUs after EnVyUs released its French team and signed the core of Splyce players who were released by Splyce.) (Season 7 Relegation)

Europe

- mousesports (Season 7 #1)
- Ninjas in Pyjamas (Season 7 #2)
- Natus Vincere (Season 7 #3)
- FaZe Clan (Season 7 #4)
- ex-Space Soldiers (Note: The Space Soldiers players refused to play under the organization after failing to negotiate salaries.) (Season 7 #5)
- Astralis (Season 7 #6)
- HellRaisers (Season 7 #7)
- Heroic (Season 7 #8)
- North (Season 7 #9)
- G2 Esports (Season 7 #10)
- Fnatic (Season 7 #11)
- BIG (ESEA Premier Season 27)
- AGO Esports (Season 7 Relegation)
- Windigo Gaming (Season 7 Relegation)

Asia

- 2ez Gaming
- Beyond Esports
- B.O.O.T-dream[S]cape
- CyberZen
- EHOME
- EXECUTIONERS
- Flash Gaming
- FrostFire
- GOSU (Note: 5Power Gaming withdraw from the league. GOSU is brought in to replace 5Power.)
- Lucid Dream
- MVP PK
- OpTic India (Note: OpTic India's Nikhil "forsaken" Kumawat was caught using cheats at eXTREMESLAND ZOWIE Asia 2018 and his contract was terminated. OpTic then released the entire OpTic India team as ESL investigated the issue. On October 22, ESL confirmed that forsaken was cheating in the India finals.)
- Recca Esports
- SCARZ Absolute
- Signature Gaming
- Slaughter Rage Army
- Team Brutality
- TNC Pro Team
- TyLoo
- ViCi Gaming

Oceania

- Chiefs eSports Club
- Grayhound Gaming
- Ground Zero Gaming
- Legacy Esports
- madlikewizards
- ORDER
- Paradox Gaming
- Tainted Minds

Latin America

- Bragantino e-Sports
- Imperial e-Sports
- Isurus Gaming
- No2B e-Sports Clube
- Santos e-Sports
- Sharks Esports
- Team Wild
- W7M Gaming

== North America ==
=== Broadcast talent ===
Host

- James Banks

Commentators

- Tim "brainstorm" Dunne
- Conner "Scrawny" Girvan
- Mohan "launders" Govindasamy
- Jordan "Elfishguy" Mays
- Mitch "Pili" Pilipowski
- Iain "SnypeR" Turner
- Kevin "KaRath" Zhu

Analyst

- Joona "natu" Leppänen

Observers

- Heather "sapphiRe" Garozzo
- DJ "Prius" Kuntz

=== Standings ===
The North American standings are shown below. Each team's in-game leader is shown first. Rosters reflect what they look like by the end of the regular season. For instance, Brandon "-Ace" Winn of eUnited was benched in favor of Pujan "FNS" Mehta. Therefore, FNS's name is shown in the eUnited roster below rather than -Ace's.

MIBR was the first team to qualify for the Finals in just the second week of play after the team defeated NRG Esports in two maps; after losing to eUnited, MIBR went on an 8–0 run to clinch a spot. Ghost Gaming clinched its spot a day after MIBR clinched when the Canadian team defeated INTZ eSports. Although on an off week, Renegades and Team Liquid clinched their spots on Odense after eUnited went 1–1 in maps against Team EnVyUs and INTZ eSports. NRG eSports clinched in week 4 after winning against the Renegades via forfeit.

Going into the final day, just one spot was open to a flight to Odense. INTZ eSports was the frontrunner with 29 points, but Cloud9 and eUnited had 26 points, and compLexity Gaming had an outside chance with 24 points. Cloud9 faced off against a revitalized NRG eSports, compLexity had to face off against the team that was running away with North America's top spot in MIBR, INTZ went against a Rogue team that was unproven after the FACEIT Major, and eUnited against an experienced but inconsistent Luminosity Gaming. It came down to the wire by the end of the day. Cloud9 suffered a loss to NRG while eUnited and INTZ defeated their respective opponents, effectively eliminating Cloud9 from Finals contention. compLexity was demolished by MIBR shortly after Cloud9 lost, which would not only eliminate compLexity, but give MIBR the top seed in the league. eUnited did its job by defeating Luminosity, but INTZ fell to Rogue, which would place both teams at 32 points. However, because INTZ won the head-to-head, four points to two, INTZ won the last spot over eUnited. At the bottom of the standings, Rogue was unable to catch up to compLexity and was one point shy after splitting the series against INTZ. Meanwhile, Team EnVyUs had the fortune of playing against a Renegades team that was playing out of the country, meaning EnVyUs had a much easier time taking two maps while Luminosity dropped both maps to eUnited. This means EnVyUs had a second chance at staying in Pro League after starting the season 1–13 by playing in the relegation phase with Rogue while Luminosity would automatically be demoted to the Premier Division.

Standings
Place	Prize Money	Team	W–L	OT W–L	RD	Pts	Roster	Coach
1st	TBD	MIBR	17–3	2–0	+122	55	FalleN, coldzera, fer, Stewie2K, tarik	YNk
2nd	TBD	Ghost Gaming	14–6	2–0	+72	46	steel, Subroza, Wardell, koosta, neptune	JamezIRL
3rd	TBD	Team Liquid	13–8	0–1	+39	40	nitr0, EliGE, NAF, Twistzz, TACO	zews
4th	TBD	NRG Esports	12–8	2–0	+60	40	daps, Brehze, FugLy, nahtE, CeRq	ImAPet
5th	TBD	Renegades	11–7	1–3	+33	38	AZR, Gratisfaction, jks, liazz, jkaem	kassad
6th	TBD	INTZ eSports	10–10	0–2	−5	32	horvy, chelo, felps, kNgV-, xand	Apoka
7th	US$27,000	eUnited	10–11	1–0	−13	32	FNS, dapr, dazzLe, -Relyks, moose	osorandom
8th	US$23,000	Cloud9	9–12	1–0	−26	29	Golden, flusha, kioShiMa, autimatic, RUSH	valens
9th	US$19,000	compLexity Gaming	7–13	1–1	−24	24	stanislaw, ANDROIDx23, ShahZaM, yay, dephh	Rambo
10th	US$17,500	Rogue	6–12	1–3	−57	23	MSL, Hiko, SicK, vice, Rickeh	mCe
11th	US$15,000	Team EnVyUs	6–14	0–2	−102	20	Nifty, Drone, jdm64, Pollo, reltuC	Eley
12th	US$11,500	Luminosity Gaming	5–16	1–0	−99	17	steel, HEN1, LUCAS1, NEKIZ, yeL	zakk

North America Results

Results
	Liquid	NRG	C9	RNG	Rogue	LG	Ghost	MIBR	INTZ	eU	coL	nV
Liquid		16–14; 15–19	16–10; 13–16	16–14; 14–16	16–2; 10–16	16–8; 10–16	16–12; 11–16	1–16; 9–16	16–6; 16–14	16–7; 16–5	10–16; 16–10	16–6; 16–7
NRG	14–16; 19–15		16–4; 11–16	W-FF; W-FF^{1}	22–19; 16–9	16–8; 11–16	12–16; 14–16	14–16; 13–16	16–13; 16–5	16–8; 16–9	16–13; 12–16	16–3; 16–10
C9	10–16; 16–13	4–16; 16–11		14–16; 19–15	16–9; 16–12	11–16; 14–16	16–14; 16–14	9–16; 8–16	10–16; 16–6	6–16; 16–9	16–8; 10–16	7–16; 11–16
RNG	14–16; 16–14	FF-W; FF-W^{1}	16–14; 15–19		16–11; 16–10	16–3; 16–12	17–19; 17–19	10–16; 11–16	16–10; 16–14	16–3; 16–7	22–19; 16–12	6–16; 13–16
Rogue	2–16; 16–10	19–22; 9–16	9–16; 12–16	11–16; 10–16		16–5; 16–5	5–16; 7–16	17–19; 7–16	12–16; 16–12	1–16; 10–16	20–22; 16–14	16–6; 22–19
LG	8–16; 16–10	8–16; 16–11	16–11; 16–14	3–16; 12–16	5–16; 5–16		11–16; 7–16	10–16; 8–16	10–16; 12–16	2–16; 11–16	5–16; 11–16	19–15; 16–9
Ghost	12–16; 16–11	16–12; 16–14	14–16; 14–16	19–17; 19–17	16–5; 16–7	16–11; 16–7		16–6; 16–14	13–16; 16–7	14–16; 16–10	6–16; 16–8	16–12; 16–9
MIBR	16–1; 16–9	16–14; 16–13	16–9; 16–8	16–10; 16–11	19–17; 16–7	16–10; 16–8	6–16; 14–16		19–15; 16–4	16–13; 14–16	16–5; 16–12	16–4; 16–4
INTZ	6–16; 14–16	13–16; 5–16	16–10; 16–6	10–16; 14–16	16–12; 12–16	16–10; 16–12	16–13; 7–16	15–19; 4–16		16–7; 20–22	16–13; 16–4	16–3; 16–6
eU	7–16; 5–16	8–16; 9–16	16–6; 9–16	3–16; 7–16	16–1; 16–10	16–2; 16–11	16–14; 10–16	13–16; 16–14	7–16; 22–20		16–9; 16–11	13–16; 16–12
coL	16–10; 10–16	13–16; 16–12	8–16; 16–10	19–22; 12–16	22–20; 14–16	16–5; 16–11	16–6; 8–16	5–16; 12–16	13–16; 4–16	9–16; 11–16		14–16; 16–6
nV	6–16; 7–16	3–16; 10–16	16–7; 16–11	16–6; 16–13	6–16; 19–22	15–19; 9–16	12–16; 9–16	4–16; 4–16	3–16; 6–16	16–13; 12–16	16–14; 6–16	

^{1}Renegades forfeited both matches to NRG Esports as the team was in Australis in preparation of the Intel Extreme Masters Season XIII – World Championship Asia Minor Oceanic qualifier. However, they decided to play against Team EnVyUs despite the poor connection.

== Europe ==
=== Broadcast talent ===
Host

- Tres "stunna" Saranthus

Commentators

- Alex "Snodz" Byfield
- Hugo Byron
- Benjamin "Esio" Doughty
- Jack "Jacky" Peters
- Harry "JustHarry" Russell

Analyst

- Chad "SPUNJ" Burchill
- Jacob "Pimp" Winneche

Observers

- Alex "Rushly" Rush

=== Standings ===
The European final standings are shown below. Each team's in-game leaders are shown first. Rosters reflect what they look like by the end of the regular season. For instance, at the beginning of the season, mousesports had Janusz "Snax" Pogorzelski on the roster, but he was later replaced by Martin "STYKO" Styk. Therefore, STYKO's name is shown on the mousesports roster below.

Astralis was the first team to clinch a spot as the red hot Danes guaranteed at least one team would be playing in front of its home crowd after HellRaisers overtook FaZe Clan for the number seven spot in the standings. Natus Vincere was close by after taking a map off of AGO Esports. BIG did not play in the third week, but since FaZe Clan only had two maps to play with 31 points, the mixed squad could not catch up to BIG's 44 or North's 41, allowing the Germans and Danes to book a spot at the Finals. G2 Esports clinched the next spot after sweeping AGO Esports. Astralis clinched the first seed after defeating AGO Esports on the final day of the regular season.

Going into the final day, the last two spots were up for grabs with five teams vying for a spot, with mousesports sitting at 37 points, HellRaisers at 36, ex-Space Soldiers at 33, Windigo Gaming at 32, and FaZe Clan at 31. ex-Space Soldiers faced off against a struggling Fnatic, mousesports against an inconsistent Ninjas in Pyjamas, Windigo against the hot and cold North, FaZe against a middle-of-the-pack team in Heroic, and HellRaisers against another inconsistent team in G2. FaZe was demolished be Heroic in the first map, effectively eliminating FaZe from playoff contention. Windigo lost to North, which would eliminate the Bulgarians in their first season in Pro League from Finals contention. mousesports locked up a spot after scraping past Ninjas in Pyjamas. ex-Space Soldiers lost to Fnatic in overtime, meaning that HellRaisers needed to win in regulation to take the last spot. HellRaisers did secure a win, but it was an overtime win, meaning it would need the second map. Fnatic easily took down ex-Space Soldiers, so HellRaisers survived and went to another EPL Finals. Because of Heroic's sweep over FaZe and NiP's one loss to mousesports, this allowed Heroic to jump FaZe and NiP in the standings and securing a spot for next season while the two Swedish teams would need to play in a relegation bracket.

Final Standings
Place	Prize Money	Team	W–L	OT W–L	RD	Pts	Roster	Coach
1st	TBD	Astralis	19–3	1–3	+126	62	gla1ve, dev1ce, dupreeh, Magisk, Xyp9x	zonic
2nd	TBD	Natus Vincere	16–6	2–2	+55	54	Zeus, Edward, s1mple, electronic, flamie	kane
3rd	TBD	BIG	13–7	4–2	+77	49	gob b, nex, tabseN, tiziaN, smooya	LEGIJA
4th	TBD	North	12–10	4–0	+42	44	cadiaN, aizy, gade, Kjaerbye, valde	ave
5th	TBD	HellRaisers	11–10	3–2	−21	41	ANGE1, DeadFox, woxic, HObbit, ISSAA	Johnta
6th	TBD	mousesports	13–12	0–1	+46	40	chrisJ, oskar, ropz, STYKO, suNny	lmbt
7th	TBD	G2 Esports	13–12	0–1	−25	40	Ex6TenZ, bodyy, kennyS, shox, SmithZz	NiaK
8th	US$23,000	Windigo Gaming	10–12	1–3	−6	35	bubble, blocker, pNshr, SHiPZ, v1c7oR	ToH1o
9th	US$19,000	ex-Space Soldiers	10–13	1–2	−21	34	MAJ3R, Calyx, ngiN, paz, XANTARES	hardstyle
10th	US$17,500	Heroic	10–15	1–0	−44	32	AcilioN, es3tag, mertz, friberg, MODDII	naSu
11th	US$15,000	FaZe Clan	10–15	0–1	−34	31	NiKo, GuardiaN, karrigan, olofmeister, rain	RobbaN
12th	US$11,500	Ninjas in Pyjamas	10–16	0–0	−66	30	Lekr0, dennis, f0rest, GeT_RiGhT, REZ	pita
13th	US$8,000	Fnatic	8–15	2–1	−32	29	Xizt, JW, KRiMZ, twist, ScreaM	Jumpy
14th	US$4,000	AGO Gaming	7–16	1–2	−97	25	TOAO, Furlan, GruBy, phr, SZPERO	miNlr0x

Europe Results

Results
	mouz	NiP	Na'Vi	FaZe	SS	Astralis	HR	Heroic	North	G2	Fnatic	BIG	AGO	WG
mouz		16–14; 14–16	16–11; 8–16	13–16; 16–13	7–16; 16–9	13–16; 11–16	16–9; 16–4	16–13; 16–3	12–16; 16–6	16–5; 16–8	13–16; 16–5	16–19; 9–16	16–4; 10–16	13–16; 14–16
NiP	14–16; 16–14		13–16; 11–16	16–11; 16–11	6–16; 2–16	4–16; 16–7	16–7; 11–16	13–16; 11–16	16–9; 9–16	2–16; 5–16	16–11; 5–16	16–13; 5–16	16–11; 13–16	11–16; 16–11
Na'Vi	11–16; 16–8	16–13; 16–11		16–14; 16–14	16–9; 16–5	4–16; 19–16	14–16; 16–8	16–9; 16–6	16–14; 17–19	11–16; 16–9	22–20; 16–11	5–16; 17–19	7–16; 16–8	16–8; 16–11
FaZe	16–13; 13–16	11–16; 11–16	14–16; 14–16		12–16; 16–13	7–16; 4–16	17–19; 9–16	3–16; 6–16	16–10; 14–16	9–16; 16–14	5–16; 16–11	9–16; 16–11	16–5; 16–3	16–5; 16–8
SS	16–7; 9–16	16–6; 16–2	9–16; 5–16	16–12; 13–16		21–25; 19–15	9–16; 10–16	16–12; 10–16	7–16; 6–16	16–7; 14–16	16–19; 4–16	16–6; 4–16	16–6; 10–16	16–8; 16–14
Astralis	16–13; 16–11	16–4; 7–16	16–4; 16–19	16–7; 16–4	25–21; 15–19		16–6; 16–10	16–5; 16–9	17–19; 16–13	16–3; 16–2	16–12; 16–4	16–9; 13–16	16–11; 10–16	16–13; 16–14
HR	9–16; 4–16	7–16; 16–11	16–14; 8–16	19–17; 16–9	16–9; 16–10	7–16; 10–16		14–16; 16–14	15–19; 16–14	22–18; 16–5	16–5; 16–13	16–10; 2–16	28–24; 13–16	15–19; 1–16
Heroic	13–16; 3–16	16–13; 16–11	9–16; 6–16	16–3; 16–6	12–16; 16–10	5–16; 9–16	16–14; 14–16		6–16; 10–16	12–16; 6–16	16–13; 10–16	16–11; 10–16	16–7; 16–14	10–16; 22–19
North	12–16; 6–16	9–16; 16–9	14–16; 19–17	10–16; 16–14	16–7; 16–6	19–17; 13–16	19–15; 14–16	16–6; 16–10		16–8; 13–16	16–11; 9–16	22–20; 13–16	16–6; 16–10	16–7; 5–16
G2	5–16; 8–16	16–2; 16–5	16–11; 9–16	16–9; 14–16	7–16; 16–14	3–16; 2–16	18–22; 5–16	16–12; 16–6	8–16; 16–13		16–10; 10–16	6–16; 16–11	16–6; 16–4	16–14; 3–16
Fnatic	16–13; 5–16	11–16; 16–5	20–22; 11–16	16–5; 11–16	19–16; 16–4	12–16; 4–16	5–16; 13–16	13–16; 16–10	11–16; 16–9	16–10; 10–16		5–16; 22–19	8–16; 16–11	10–16; 14–16
BIG	19–16; 16–9	13–16; 16–5	16–5; 19–17	16–9; 11–16	6–16; 16–4	9–16; 16–13	10–16; 16–2	11–16; 16–10	20–22; 16–13	16–6; 11–16	16–5; 19–22		16–9; 19–17	19–17; 16–4
AGO	4–16; 16–10	11–16; 16–13	16–11; 8–16	5–16; 3–16	6–16; 16–10	11–16; 16–10	24–28; 16–13	7–16; 14–16	6–16; 10–16	6–16; 4–16	16–8; 11–16	9–16; 17–16		7–16; 19–17
WG	16–13; 16–14	16–11; 11–16	8–16; 11–16	5–16; 8–16	8–16; 14–16	13–16; 14–16	19–15; 16–1	16–10; 19–22	7–16; 16–5	14–16; 16–3	16–10; 16–14	17–19; 4–16	16–7; 17–19	

== Asia ==
The Asia finals will feature two teams from China, one team from Southeast Asia, and one team from India. China and Southeast Asia played in an eight team, double elimination, best of three bracket, with the exception of the finals, which was a best of five with the team from the winner's side receiving an automatic 1–0 advantage. India's qualifier was part of the ESL India Premiership 2018 Fall. Teams played in a twelve team group stage, in which each team played each other once. The top four teams move on to the bracket stage in a best of three, four team bracket. The finals will feature a four team, single elimination, best of three bracket.

=== China ===
ViCi Gaming had an unexpected run after upsetting TyLoo and MVP PK to take the top seed in the Asia Finals. CyberZen had the same result through a different path, upsetting Asia's two best teams to take the second spot in the China qualifier.

Upper round 1	Upper round 2	Upper final	Qualified
1	TyLoo	1
8	ViCi Gaming	2
8	ViCi Gaming	2
5	CyberZen	0
4	SZ Absolute	0
5	CyberZen	2
8	ViCi Gaming	2
3	MVP PK	1
2	Flash Gaming	0
7	GOSU	2
7	GOSU	1
3	MVP PK	2
3	MVP PK	2
6	EHOME	1	8	ViCi Gaming
5	CyberZen
Lower round 1	Lower round 2	Lower round 3	Lower final
7	GOSU	0
1	TyLoo	2	1	TyLoo	2	3	MVP PK	1
4	SZ Absolute	0	1	TyLoo	1	5	CyberZen	2
5	CyberZen	2
2	Flash Gaming	1
2	Flash Gaming	W	5	CyberZen	2
6	EHOME	FF

=== Southeast Asia ===
After falling to the Singaporean team B.O.O.T-dream[S]cape, Lucid Dream defeated FrostFire and B.O.O.T-dream[S]cape before beating Signature Gaming in the final two maps of the finals.

Upper round 1	Upper round 2	Upper final	Final
1	B.O.O.T-d[S]	2
8	Recca Esports	0
1	B.O.O.T-d[S]	2
4	Lucid Dream	0
4	Lucid Dream	2
5	EXECU.	0
1	B.O.O.T-d[S]	0
2	Signature G.	2
2	Signature G.	2
7	Beyond Esports	2
2	Signature G.	2
6	FrostFire	0
3	TNC Pro Team	1
6	FrostFire	2	2	Signature G.	2
4	Lucid Dream	3
Lower round 1	Lower round 2	Lower round 3	Lower final
6	FrostFire	2
8	Recca Esports	2	8	Recca Esports	1	1	B.O.O.T-d[S]	1
5	EXECU.	0	6	FrostFire	1	4	Lucid Dream	2
4	Lucid Dream	2
4	Lucid Dream	2
7	Beyond Esp.	2	7	Beyond Esports	1
3	TNC Pro Team	0

=== China and Southeast Asia final standings ===
Both Asian leagues' standings are shown below. Each team's in-game leaders are shown below.

Place	Team	Roster	Coach
1st	Lucid Dream	Leaf, JUSTCAUSE, NIFFY, wannafly, Zendy	0bi
1st	ViCi Gaming	advent, aumaN, zhokiNg, Freeman, kaze	
2nd	CyberZen	tb, bottle, HZ, Savage, tb, Viva	Addingwll
2nd	Signature Gaming	Reality, husk!!e, j9, PPOverdose, RoLEX	
3rd	B.O.O.T-dream[S]cape	ImpressioN, Bobosaur, moxie, splashske, Tommy	dsn
3rd	MVP PK	solo, glow, minixeta, XigN, zeff	termi
4th	FrostFire	aimaNNN, acAp, CHAPMAN, d4v41, Subbey	
4th	TyLoo	BnTeT, captainMo, DD, somebody, xccurate	CruSad3
5th – 6th	Beyond Esports	TOR, cbbk, Geniuss, Olivia, stk	
5th – 6th	Flash Gaming	Summer, Artill, Attacker, Ayaya, LOVEYY	z8z
5th – 6th	GOSU	Lakia, HSK, Jinx, SeokE, stax	
5th – 6th	Recca Esports	asterisk, Eeyore, FrostMisty, roseau, Sys	
7th – 8th	EHOME	Karsa, Ayeon, despacitolan, HaoKing, Marek	
7th – 8th	EXECUTIONERS	Ace, adrnkiNg, blaZeK1ng, kr0, Wnd	bali
7th – 8th	SCARZ Absolute	Laz, barce, crow, Reita, takej	
7th – 8th	TNC Pro Team	Papichulo, BORKUM, Kenzyy, Pro., witz	

=== India ===
==== Group stage ====
The group stage standings are shown below. Rosters are shown in alphabetical order. Teams that placed fifth through eighth earned roughly US$1,034.92 each and the teams that placed ninth through twelfth earned roughly US$517.46 each.

Place	Team	W–L	RD	Roster	Pts
1	OpTic India	11–0	+83	Antitode, forsaken, haiVann, Marzil, yb	33
2	Team Brutality	8–3	+71	astaRR, Fox, Juventa, RiX, V3nom	24
3	Slaughter Rage Army	8–3	+26	Aflekx, DreaM, JaguaR, MaChO, The_Guru	24
4	2ez Gaming	8–3	+18	BadmaN, PoKI, RecoilMaster, ReX, t1toSAVAGE	24
5	Entity eSports	7–4	+44	Amaterasu, DEATHMAKER, Excali, HellrangeR, HuntR	21
6	Team iNvictus	7–4	+42	BinaryBUG, blackhawk, Manan, pashasahil, ribbiz	21
7	JHS	6–5	+10	BADlove, HArsH, JuveN, NEPU, STARRRRR	18
8	God Partivles	4–7	−20	EmbeR, KnightRider, MagicieN, sh1vy, spyder	12
9	ATE Gaming	4–7	−16	Bogeymanh, BusterrR, Impale, KappA, spyderKav1sh	12
10	Team Malhars	2–9	−45	Anakil, HellfightRR, PokerF, ProuD, Shabby	6
11	MaG PuneF1ve	1–10	−37	karam1L, Mav1s, NeverGiv3uP, RSN, vel0city	3
12	~~darks1d3~~^{1}	0–11	0	Alghanimzzzzz, cHinGii, n1ex, Nem0, t0tti	0

^{1} darks1d3 drops out

==== India Finals ====
After Nikhil "forsaken" Kumawat was caught cheating and given a five-year ban from the Esports Integrity Coalition and after OpTic Gaming released its OpTic India team, ESL announced that the former OpTic India players would forfeit their spot. ESL announced that 2ez Gaming, the loser to OpTic India in the semifinals, and Slaughter Rage Army, the loser to OpTic India in the finals, would play to determine the final spot in the Asia Finals.

2ez Gaming would scrape past Slaughter Rage Army to take the final spot in the Asia Finals. Team Brutality earned about US$1,687, Slaughter Rage Army earned about US$3,375, and 2ez Gaming earned about US$6,750. OpTic India did not earn any money as a result of being disqualified.

Semifinals
~~OpTic India~~	DQ
2ez Gaming	W
Team Brutality	0
Slaughter Rage Army	2

Finals
2ez Gaming	2
Slaughter Rage Army	0

=== Asia Finals ===
Prize money was handed out in the Asia finals. The semifinalists earned US$7,000 each and the runner-up earned US$15,000

ViCi Gaming took the first map over 2ez Gaming 16–12, but the Indians were able to surprise the Asian scene and take a map off of the Chinese with the same 16–12 score. However, ViCi adjusted well and dominated the final map 16–3 to head to the grand finals. Meanwhile, CyberZen nearly blew an 11–4 lead against Lucid Dream, but came up on top 16–12 before shutting down the Thai team 16–3 in the second map. In a close two-game sweep, ViCi took down CyberZen and went to Odense as Asia's representative.

Semifinals
CHN1	ViCi Gaming	2
IND	2ez Gaming	1
SEA	Lucid Dream	0
CHN2	CyberZen	2

EPLS8 Finals Qualifier
CHN1	ViCi Gaming	2
CHN2	CyberZen	0

== Oceania ==
The Oceania region featured an eight team, best of three, double elimination bracket. Five teams from Australia and one team from New Zealand were invited and another two teams qualified through online qualifiers. The winners earned a spot in the Odense Finals.

The two expected teams reached the finals, but both teams lost players to the Renegades, with Grayhound Gaming's star AWPer Sean "Gratisfaction"' Kaiwai and ORDER's Jay "liazz" Tregillgas leaving their respective teams to join Oceania's best team playing in North America. After some close games, ORDER was the team to come out on top and headed to Denmark for the Finals.

Upper round 1	Upper round 2	Upper final	Final
1	Grayhound G.	W
8	Paradox G.	FF
1	Grayhound G.	2
5	Chiefs ESC	0
4	Legacy Esports	1
5	Chiefs ESC	2
1	Grayhound G.	1
2	ORDER	2
2	ORDER	2
7	Ground Zero	2
2	ORDER	2
3	Tainted Minds	1
3	Tainted Minds	2
6	madlikewizards	0	2	ORDER	3
1	Grayhound G.	1
Lower round 1	Lower round 2	Lower round 3	Lower final
3	Tainted Minds	2
8	Paradox G.	1	4	Legacy Esports	0	1	Grayhound G.	2
4	Legacy Esp.	2	3	Tainted Minds	1	5	Chiefs ESC	0
5	Chiefs ESC	2
5	Chiefs ESC	2
7	Ground Zero	2	7	Ground Zero	1
6	madlikewizards	0

=== Oceania standings ===
The final Oceania standings are shown below. Each team's in-game leader is shown first. The in-game leader for Paradox Gaming is unknown. Second placed earned US$15,000, third place earned US$9,000, and fourth placed earned US$5,000.

Place	Team	Roster	Coach
1st	ORDER	emagine, aliStair, hatz, INS, zepg	Elmapuddy
2nd	Grayhound Gaming	erkaSt, dexter, DickStacy, malta, sterling	
3rd	Chiefs eSports Club	MoeycQ, flickz, Infrequent, lyeN, Texta	
4th	Tainted Minds	apoc, ofnu, sico, zewsy, USTILO	ferg
5th – 6th	Ground Zero	NikkeZ, bURNRUOk, deStiny, kyoto, Xtinct	PeetyG
5th – 6th	Legacy Esports	LONS, BL1TZ, stat, Lacore, soju_j	Kingfisher
7th – 8th	madlikewizards	Dezibel, Ayrez, chelleos, JS, smooth_criminal22	
7th – 8th	Paradox Gaming	Chiswell, Chub, keeyto, Mayker, Valiance	

== Latin America ==
South America's league was part of ESL Latin American League Season 2. Teams were split up into two groups of four and played a standard GSL, double elimination format. The two finalists played in an offline final in São Paulo, Brazil, and the winner of that series earned a spot in the EPL Season 8 Finals.

Group A

Pos	Team	W	L	RF	RA	RD	Pts
1	Sharks Esports	2	0	71	42	+29	6
2	Isurus Gaming	2	1	92	76	+16	6
3	No2B e-Sports Clube	1	2	70	98	−28	3
4	Santos e-Sports	0	2	45	64	−19	0

Group A Results
Sharks Esports	2	0	No2B e-Sports Clube
Isurus Gaming	2	0	Santos e-Sports
Santos e-Sports	0	2	No2B e-Sports Clube
Sharks Esports	2	1	Isurus Gaming
Isurus Gaming	2	0	No2B e-Sports Clube

Group B

Pos	Team	W	L	RF	RA	RD	Pts
1	Imperial e-Sports	2	0	64	42	+22	6
2	Team Wild	2	1	83	74	+9	6
3	W7M Gaming	1	2	81	79	+2	3
4	Bragantino e-Sports	0	1	31	64	−33	0

Group B Results
Team Wild	2	0	Bragantino e-Sports
W7M Gaming	2	0	Imperial e-Sports
W7M Gaming	2	0	Bragantino e-Sports
Team Wild	0	2	Imperial e-Sports
Team Wild	2	0	W7M Gaming

Isurus Gaming was able to scrape past Imperial e-Sports after an intense third map that saw Imperial have a 12–3 and then a 14–5 lead before Isurus made a huge comeback to win 16–14. Sharks Esports easily took down Team Wild in the first map 16–8, but needed to go to overtime to sweep the series in a 19–16 victory. Sharks and Isurus each had 16–5 wins, but a 16–9 and a close 16–14 win in favor of Sharks allowed the Brazilians to repeat at Latin America champions and head back to another EPL Finals.

Semifinals
A1	Sharks Esports	2
B2	Team Wild	0
B1	Imperial e-Sports	1
A2	Isurus Gaming	2

Finals
A1	Sharks Esports	3
A2	Isurus Gaming	1

=== South America standings ===
The final South America standings are shown below.

Place	Prize Money	Team	Roster	Coach
1st	TBD	Sharks Esports	exit, jnt, leo_drunky, nak, RCF	coachi
2nd	R$20,000	Isurus Gaming	1962, nbl, Noktse, Reversive, Tutehen	pino
3rd – 4th	R$7,000	Imperial e-Sports	dzt, shz, SHOOWTiME, tifa, zqk	Kaos
3rd – 4th	R$7,000	Team Wild	destinyy, KHTEX, land1n, PKL, tatazin	bruno
5th – 6th	R$2,000	No2B e-Sports Clube	dug, frt1, ovr, pesadelooo, Tuurtle	
5th – 6th	R$2,000	W7M Gaming	pancc, raafa, RMN, ryotzz, YJ	Peu
7th – 8th	R$1,000	Bragantino e-Sports	DANVIET, DrG, koe, r4ul, SoweLL	
7th – 8th	R$1,000	Santos e-Sports	ALLE, cadelao, delboNi, fP1, LeoGOD	ZaMpA

== Finals ==
The finalized teams are shown below. Each team's HLTV.org ranking for December 3, 2018 – the final rankings before the Finals – is shown next to the team.

North America

- MIBR (5)
- Ghost Gaming (25)
- Renegades (19)
- NRG Esports (6)
- Team Liquid (3)
- INTZ eSports (39)

Europe

- Astralis (1)
- Natus Vincere (2)
- BIG (9)
- North (10)
- HellRaisers (13)
- mousesports (8)
- G2 Esports (28)

Asia

- ViCi Gaming (66)

Oceania

- ORDER (62)

South America

- Sharks Esports (92)

=== Broadcast talent ===
Desk host

- Tres "stunna" Saranthus

Stage host

- OJ Borg

Interviewer

- James Banks

Commentators

- Hugo Byron
- Tim "brainstorm" Dunne
- Henry "HenryG" Greer
- Geordie "Mac" McAleer
- Jake "Hysterics" Osypenko
- Mitch "pili" Pilipowski
- Harry "JustHarry" Russell
- Matthew "Sadokist" Trivett

Analysts

- Chad "SPUNJ" Burchill
- Joona "natu" Leppänen
- Jacob "Pimp" Winneche

Observers

- Alex "Rushly" Rush

=== Group stage ===
The format of the group stage is a two group, eight team, double elimination bracket. The teams that win their brackets will move on to the semifinals while the next two teams will be in the quarterfinals.

==== Group A ====
Astralis kicked off the EPL Season 8 Finals by taking down ViCi after a close first half only to put on a show with its signature counter-terrorist side in the second half. HellRaisers put up a 13–2 halftime lead against the Renegades and never looked back after that. G2's struggles continued against Team Liquid after putting up a close first half; Liquid held G2 to one round in the second half to put the French away. BIG took down one of the newest additions to EPL in INTZ eSports in a somewhat close game. Renegades continued its domination over Asian teams by taking down ViCi to send the first team home. After splitting two maps, G2 and INTZ had a long fight that extended to double overtime; G2 shut out INTZ in the second overtime to stay alive despite Kenny "kennyS" Schrub struggling. HellRaisers managed to take the first map against the world's best in Astralis and had a chance to sweep the Danes, but Astralis hung on. Astralis took that momentum in ran over HellRaisers to secure a playoff spot. Liquid stifled BIG in the other winner's semifinals and Liquid and Astralis met once again in tournament. BIG's exceptional season came is a disappointing end as the Germans lost a best of three to the Renegades, losing badly in the maps they lost as BIG's star players in Owen "smooya" Butterfield and Johannes "tabseN" Wodarz did not show up. HellRaisers dominated G2 on the map the international squad won, but G2 had the more important result by taking two maps, both in comeback fashion as Edouard "SmithZz" Dubourdeaux and Kevin "Ex6TenZ" Droolans looked to close out their stints with G2 with success. Astralis had no problem dealing with Liquid again as the Danes swept the North Americas in two maps, including extending their Nuke win streak. In the loser's side, G2 had a chance to take clinch a playoff berth, but it was the newly formed Renegades lineup that came away in the end.

Upper round 1
EU1	Astralis	1
AS	ViCi Gaming	0
EU5	HellRaisers	1
NA5	Renegades	0
NA3	Team Liquid	1
EU7	G2 Esports	0
EU3	BIG	1
NA6	INTZ eSports	0
Lower round 1
AS	ViCi Gaming	0
NA5	Renegades	2
EU7	G2 Esports	2
NA6	INTZ eSports	1

Upper round 2
EU1	Astralis	2
EU5	HellRaisers	1
NA3	Team Liquid	2
EU3	BIG	0
Lower round 2
EU3	BIG	1
NA5	Renegades	2
EU5	HellRaisers	1
EU7	G2 Esports	2

Upper final
EU1	Astralis	2
NA3	Team Liquid	0
Lower qualifier
NA5	Renegades	2
EU7	G2 Esports	1

Group A Results

Group A matches
Team	Score	Map	Score	Team
Astralis	16	Inferno	8	ViCi Gaming
HellRaisers	16	Mirage	5	Renegades
Team Liquid	16	Nuke	8	G2 Esports
BIG	16	Train	10	INTZ eSports
Astralis	8	Mirage	16	HellRaisers
Astralis	16	Dust II	13	HellRaisers
Astralis	16	Inferno	4	HellRaisers
Team Liquid	16	Inferno	6	BIG
Team Liquid	16	Dust II	6	BIG
Team Liquid	–	Nuke	–	BIG
ViCi Gaming	12	Inferno	16	Renegades
ViCi Gaming	9	Mirage	16	Renegades
ViCi Gaming	–	Train	–	Renegades
G2 Esports	16	Overpass	6	INTZ eSports
G2 Esports	8	Mirage	16	INTZ eSports
G2 Esports	22	Dust II	18	INTZ eSports
BIG	5	Cache	16	Renegades
BIG	16	Overpass	14	Renegades
BIG	7	Train	16	Renegades
HellRaisers	13	Dust II	16	G2 Esports
HellRaisers	16	Inferno	5	G2 Esports
HellRaisers	13	Overpass	16	G2 Esports
Astralis	16	Inferno	12	Team Liquid
Astralis	16	Nuke	8	Team Liquid
Astralis	–	Overpass	–	Team Liquid
Renegades	10	Overpass	16	G2 Esports
Renegades	16	Train	13	G2 Esports
Renegades	16	Cache	8	G2 Esports

==== Group B ====
MIBR started off group B by thrashing its compatriots in Sharks Esports as Leonardo "leo_drunky" Oliveira went the whole map without getting a kill; although he did get two kills, he killed one of his teammates and killed himself to set his kill total back to zero. NRG and North had an extremely close game, but NRG managed to come out in the end after winning four of the last five rounds. Ghost could not keep up its superb EPL season against mousesports as the majority-Canadian team could not get much done on either side of the map. Natus Vincere (Na'Vi) and ORDER played in a sloppy game, but Na'Vi came back from a 10–5 deficit and then again at 14–13 to barely scrape past the Australians to move on in the winner's bracket. Sharks pulled off a massive upset over North, and the win was not a close one as Sharks completely dominated the Danes. In the other lower bracket game, Ghost easily took down ORDER in the first map, but was forced to come back from an 8–13 deficit in the second map as Ghost eliminated the Australians. MIBR and NRG dominated each other's picks, but MIBR came back from a 5–10 deficit and then a 12–15 disadvantage to go on and win in overtime to secure a playoffs spot. Na'Vi was able to win its initial match when, in the past, the win eluded them, but the CIS team was smashed by mousesports as mousesports cruised its way to a playoff berth. Na'Vi easily defeated Sharks in two maps to send South America's representative home. Ghost and NRG had a very close series. NRG barely defeated Ghost in the first map and Ghost had only a slightly easier time in the second map. In the third map, NRG had a comfortable 11–4 halftime lead, but its performance against MIBR nearly replicated itself as Ghost came all the way back to win the game 16–14, thanks in part to Yassine "Subroza" Taoufik's 26 kills. In the final winner's match, MIBR barely defeated mousesports, but then easily took the second map to win the group. In the lower bracket side, Ghost surprisingly took the first map against Na'Vi. In the second map, Na'Vi had a 15–11 lead, but Ghost came back to tie the game; however, Na'Vi was able to win the game in overtime. Na'Vi carried that momentum and took advantage of Ghost's inexperience to easily take the third map and take the final playoff spot.

Upper round 1
NA1	MIBR	1
SA	Sharks Esports	0
NA4	NRG Esports	1
EU4	North	0
NA2	Ghost Gaming	0
EU6	mousesports	1
EU2	Natus Vincere	1
OC	ORDER	0
Lower round 1
SA	Sharks Esports	2
EU4	North	0
NA2	Ghost Gaming	2
OC	ORDER	0

Upper round 2
NA1	MIBR	2
NA4	NRG Esports	1
EU6	mousesports	2
EU2	Natus Vincere	0
Lower round 2
EU2	Natus Vincere	2
SA	Sharks Esports	0
NA4	NRG Esports	1
NA2	Ghost Gaming	2

Upper final
NA1	MIBR	2
EU6	mousesports	0
Lower qualifier
EU2	Natus Vincere	2
NA2	Ghost Gaming	1

Group B Results

Group B matches
Team	Score	Map	Score	Team
MIBR	16	Inferno	2	Sharks Esports
NRG Esports	16	Train	13	North
Ghost Gaming	5	Train	16	mousesports
Natus Vincere	16	Mirage	14	ORDER
MIBR	16	Overpass	7	NRG Esports
MIBR	8	Inferno	16	NRG Esports
MIBR	19	Mirage	16	NRG Esports
mousesports	16	Nuke	6	Natus Vincere
mousesports	16	Train	4	Natus Vincere
mousesports	–	Mirage	–	Natus Vincere
Sharks Esports	16	Mirage	4	North
Sharks Esports	16	Inferno	7	North
Sharks Esports	–	Nuke	–	North
Ghost Gaming	16	Cache	5	ORDER
Ghost Gaming	16	Train	14	ORDER
Ghost Gaming	–	Inferno	–	ORDER
Natus Vincere	16	Nuke	9	Sharks Esports
Natus Vincere	16	Dust II	3	Sharks Esports
Natus Vincere	–	Mirage	–	Sharks Esports
NRG Esports	16	Inferno	14	Ghost Gaming
NRG Esports	11	Cache	16	Ghost Gaming
NRG Esports	11	Mirage	16	Ghost Gaming
MIBR	16	Train	14	mousesports
MIBR	16	Inferno	6	mousesports
MIBR	–	Mirage	–	mousesports
Natus Vincere	11	Inferno	16	Ghost Gaming
Natus Vincere	19	Train	16	Ghost Gaming
Natus Vincere	19	Mirage	6	Ghost Gaming

=== Playoffs ===
The two runner-ups from each group will each face off in the quarterfinals. The top seeds in each group will earn automatic berths to the playoffs. The quarterfinals and semifinals will be best of three matches and the finals will be a best of five.

Quarterfinals
B2	mousesports	2
A3	Renegades	1
A2	Team Liquid	2
B3	Natus Vincere	0

Semifinals
A1	Astralis	2
B2	mousesports	0
B1	MIBR	0
A2	Team Liquid	2

Grand Finals
A1	Astralis	3
A2	Team Liquid	1

==== Round of 6 ====
The playoffs started off on Cache, Renegades' map choice and the Australians proved why they like to play on the map after a 14–1 halftime lead. mousesports saw limited success in the second half by getting three rounds, but Renegades had almost zero problems closing out the first map. The next map would prove to be a close one as mousesports took an 8–7 lead by the half. However, Renegades took the next nine of twelve rounds to suddenly take a 14–11 lead and was on the brink of eliminating a strong European team. However, Tomáš "oskar" Šťastný came alive and saved his team as mousesports took the last five rounds to sneak by with a 16–14 win and tied the series. Train was the next map and mousesports ran away with the first half with a 12–3 lead. Renegades started to make a run, but the deficit proved to be too much as mousesports moved on the face Astralis in the semifinals.

Two powerhouses in the Global Offensive scene faced off in the first phase of the playoffs. On the first map, Natus Vincere struggled massively despite Oleksandr "s1mple" Kostyliev's 18 kills to try to aid the Ukrainian-Russian team. Two unexpected players showed up for Liquid as Epitácio "TACO" de Melo, who is mainly known for his support role to help his teammates succeed, and Russel "Twistzz" Van Dulken, who had been struggling with health issues, came out on top for Liquid as the North American team cruised. Natus Vincere looked to get back in the groove as Liquid took just a three-round lead by the half. However, Liquid's defense stomped Natus Vincere's terrorist side in the second half and Liquid dismantled the CIS team as TACO would go on to face his former team with Liquid.

Round of 6 matches
Team	Score	Map	Score	Team
mousesports	4	Cache	16	Renegades
mousesports	16	Mirage	14	Renegades
mousesports	16	Train	9	Renegades
Team Liquid	16	Dust II	4	Natus Vincere
Team Liquid	16	Inferno	6	Natus Vincere
Team Liquid	–	Mirage	–	Natus Vincere

==== Semifinals ====
The first semifinals match went to Mirage. mousesports took the first two rounds before Astralis struck back with three. mousesports retook the lead at 5–3, but Astralis had a six-round win streak and ended the half with a 9–6 lead. Astralis would extend its lead to 13–6, but the international team came back to make it 13–11. Astralis would then slowly walk away with the victory by taking the last three of four rounds. The next map went to Inferno. mousesports started on the counter-terrorist side, but Astralis's offense would only allow a smattering of mousesports rounds to go through as mousesports could not string consecutive rounds together. The second half showcased the infamous Astralis Inferno counter-terrorist side as the Danes let nothing go through and took the series.

The next was won by North America's best versus arguably the best core in Global Offensive history. The first map was won definitively by Liquid, which showed a strong defense, its Keith "NAF" Markovic leading with 21 kills. Liquid would carry that momentum into the second map by taking a 12–3 halftime lead on Overpass. MIBR started to show some signs of comeback in the second half, but Liquid eventually took the game with 31 kills by NAF, leading Team Liquid to again face Astralis in the grand finals.

Semifinals matches
Team	Score	Map	Score	Team
Astralis	16	Mirage	12	mousesports
Astralis	16	Inferno	5	mousesports
Astralis	–	Dust II	–	mousesports
MIBR	2	Cache	16	Team Liquid
MIBR	8	Overpass	16	Team Liquid
MIBR	–	Inferno	–	Team Liquid

==== Grand finals ====
The grand finals started off Team Liquid starting off very strong as it completely overran the coveted Astralis defense to take an 11–4 halftime lead. Astralis would make it close by taking the first four rounds of the second half, but Liquid followed up with five unanswered rounds of its own to take the first map with relative ease. Liquid had another solid first half after taking a 9–6 lead. However, Astralis's counter-terrorist side finally came alive as Liquid only gained two rounds in the second half and Astralis dominated in that half, including winning seven consecutive rounds. Astralis rode that momentum into the next map as it took 10 rounds on its terrorist side before moving onto its Inferno counter-terrorist side, something that many teams could not break. In this case, it looked like Liquid broke down whatever Astralis's setups and strategies were, something only MIBR could seemingly do, as it tied the game at 11. However, Astralis adjusted and shut down whatever Liquid had to offer and took the last five rounds and took the map. On Dust II, Astralis took a 4–0 lead, but Liquid struck back with five rounds. The teams went back and forth and Liquid came out on top 8–7 by the end of the first half. In the second half, Astralis rocketed to the lead by starting off with a booming seven round win streak to start the second half. That streak would prove too much for the North Americans as Liquid only got two rounds. Astralis took the last two rounds of the map and clinched its second straight EPL title.

With this win, Astralis won four Intel Grand Slam tournaments, meaning it won the first Intel Grand Slam and earned a bonus one million dollars.

Finals matches
Team	Score	Map	Score	Team
Astralis	8	Train	16	Team Liquid
Astralis	16	Mirage	11	Team Liquid
Astralis	16	Inferno	11	Team Liquid
Astralis	16	Dust II	10	Team Liquid
Astralis	–	Overpass	–	Team Liquid

=== Finals standings ===
Place	Team	Prize Money
1st	Astralis	US$250,000
2nd	Team Liquid	US$110,000
3rd – 4th	MIBR	US$55,000
3rd – 4th	mousesports	US$55,000
5th–6th	Natus Vincere	US$32,000
5th–6th	Renegades	US$32,000
7th–8th	G2 Esports	US$24,000
7th–8th	Ghost Gaming	US$24,000
9th–12th	BIG	US$22,000
9th–12th	HellRaisers	US$22,000
9th–12th	NRG Esports	US$22,000
9th–12th	Sharks Esports	US$22,000
13th–16th	INTZ eSports	US$20,000
13th–16th	North	US$20,000
13th–16th	ORDER	US$20,000
13th–16th	ViCi Gaming	US$20,000
