= ESL Pro League Season 2 =

ESL Pro League
- 2016

Tournament information
- Sport: Counter-Strike: Global Offensive
- Location: London, United Kingdom
- Dates: February 9, 2016–May 15, 2016.
- Administrator: Electronic Sports League (ESL)
- Teams: 24 teams
- Purse: US$250,000 for Finals; US$125,000 for Preliminaries

Final positions
- Champions: Fnatic
- 1st runners-up: Natus Vincere
- 2nd runners-up: ? (ex-TSM); Team EnVyUs

ESL Pro League Season 2 (officially known as ESL ESEA Pro League Season 2; shortened as EPL Season 2) was an Electronic Sports League (ESL) Counter-Strike: Global Offensive tournament. It was the second season of the ESL Pro League. The Finals took place in Burbank, California, United States from December 10 to December 13, 2015. The regular season for Europe began on September 9, 2015, with Ninjas in Pyjamas beating Team EnVyUs and ended with Team EnVyUs defeating mousesports. North America's season began on the same date and kicked off with compLexity Gaming defeating Enemy and concluded with Team Liquid defeating Enemy. The season ended with Fnatic defeating Natus Vincere in a close best of five finals, 3–2. Teams from two continents, North America and Europe, competed in twelve team leagues and play against each other twice to determine the top four teams from each continent would play in the Finals.

== Format ==
Each continent featured the top nine teams from last season's ESL Pro League Season 1, the winning team from ESEA Season 19: Premier Division for North America and the winning team from ESEA Season 21: Premier Division for Europe, and two teams from the ESL Pro League Season 1 Relegation. North America had one more spot remaining after roster of eLevate disbanded, so ESL invited one more team to complete the twelve team league. Teams within each continent will play each other twice to determine the top four teams to the Finals in Burbank. The regular season spanned to eleven weeks of play and all these matches were played online.

The top four teams after the conclusion of the regular season moved on to Burbank to play in the Finals; in addition, those teams were invited to next season's ESL Pro League. Teams that placed fifth to ninth place did not make the Finals, but were invited to next season's ESL Pro League. The teams in ninth and tenth place were required to play in Season 2's Relegation match, in which two teams from each continent play to see which team moves on to next season's ESL Pro League. The teams in twelfth place would have no chance to redeem themselves and were automatically demoted to the premier division.

The Finals consisted of eight teams, four from Europe and four from North America. These teams will be separated into two groups – the first and third seeds from North America and the second and fourth seeds from Europe will be in one group and the other teams in the other group. The group stage will consist of the highest seed going against the lowest seed and the middle two seeds against each other, both games in a best of one format. The winners will play in a best of one to determine one team in the Playoffs; the losers will play in a best of three to determine which team gets eliminated from the tournament. The remaining two teams will play in a best of three to determine which team will be the second team in the group to move on to the Playoffs. In the Playoffs, the semifinals will be a best of three and the finals will be a best of five. The winner of the finals will win the tournament and the top prize. All games in the Finals will be played offline.

== Teams ==
North America

- Cloud9 (Season 1 #1)
- Luminosity Gaming (Season 1 #2)
- Winterfox (Season 1 #3)
- Counter Logic Gaming (Season 1 #4)
- Team Liquid (Season 1 #5)
- compLexity Gaming (Season 1 #6)
- Conquest (Season 1 #8)
- 3sUP Enterprises (Season 1 #9)
- SapphireKelownaDotCom (Invited)
- Coastless (Premier Season 19)
- Enemy (Season 1 Relegation)
- Method (Season 1 Relegation)

Europe

- Fnatic (Season 1 #1)
- Virtus.pro (Season 1 #2)
- Team SoloMid (Season 1 #3)
- Team EnVyUs (Season 1 #4)
- Ninjas in Pyjamas (Season 1 #5)
- HellRaisers (Season 1 #6)
- Natus Vincere (Season 1 #7)
- Team Dignitas (Season 1 #8)
- Titan (Season 1 #9)
- SK Gaming (Premier Season 21)
- mousesports (Season 1 Relegation)
- PENTA Sports (Season 1 Relegation)

== North America ==
=== Broadcast Talent ===
Commentators

- Cory "megaman" Gilbert
- John "BLU" Mullen
- Jason "moses" O'Toole

=== Final standings ===
Final Standings
Place	Prize Money	Team	W-L	RF-RA	RD	Pts	Roster	Coach
1st	US$18,000	Team Liquid	18-4	340-212	+128	54	adreN, ELiGE, FugLy, Hiko, nitr0	GBJame^s
2nd	US$16,500	Luminosity Gaming	16-6	294-197	+97	48	boltz, coldzera, FalleN, fer, steel	nak
3rd	US$15,000	Conquest	15-7	324-236	+88	45	daps, NAF, stanislaw, RUSH, ShahZaM	pauLy
4th	US$13,500	Counter Logic Gaming	14-8	301-245	+56	42	hazed, jdm64, reltuC, tarik, FNS	
5th	US$13,000	compLexity Gaming	12-10	341-293	+48	36	autimatic, roca, sancz, valens, Semphis	Warden
6th	US$11,500	Cloud9	12-10	295-246	+49	36	fREAKAZOiD, n0thing, sgares, Skadoodle, shroud	
7th	US$10,000	3sUP Enterprises	11-11	284-280	+4	33	abE, arya, Professor_Chaos, jasonR, wabbit	
8th	US$8,500	Enemy	10-12	276-291	-15	30	Anomaly, koosta, MAiNLiNE, Relyks, Uber	Ryu
9th	US$7,000	SapphireKelownaDotCom	8-14	250-291	-41	24	els, hades, OCEAN, FGB, inVert	
10th	US$5,500	Method	8-14	246-276	-30	24	just9n, SileNt3m, streboR, Toy, DAVEY	
11th	US$4,000	Winterfox	8-14	270-302	-32	24	anger, desi, flowsicK, LeX, Xp3	
12th	–	Coastless^{1}	–	–	–	–	draWsouL, lemz, ScrunK	

^{1}Coastless disbands before the season starts, forcing the team to forfeit all games.

== Europe ==
=== Broadcast Talent ===
Commentators

- Anders Blume
- Mitch "Uber" Leslie
- Auguste "Semmler" Massonnat
- Alex "Machine" Richardson
- Lauren "Pansy" Scott
- Leigh "Deman" Smith

Final Standings
Place	Prize Money	Team	W-L	RF-RA	RD	Pts	Roster	Coach
1st	US$18,000	Team SoloMid	18-4	342-215	+127	54	cajunb, dev1ce, dupreeh, karrigan, Xyp9x	3k2
2nd	US$16,500	Fnatic	17-5	337-255	+82	51	dennis, flusha, KRiMZ, JW, olofmeister	vuggo
3rd	US$15,000	Natus Vincere	14-8	325-267	+58	42	Edward, flamie, GuardiaN, seized, Zeus	starix
4th	US$13,500	Team EnVyUs	14-8	311-266	+45	42	apEX, Happy, kennyS, kioShiMa, NBK-	
5th	US$13,000	Titan	12-10	270-294	-24	36	Rpk, shox, SmithZz, Ex6TenZ, ScreaM	
6th	US$11,500	Team Dignitas	12-10	269-287	-18	36	Kjaerbye, k0nfig, MSL, tenzki, RUBINO	zonic
7th	US$10,000	Ninjas in Pyjamas	11-11	294-265	+29	33	f0rest, friberg, GeT RiGhT, Xizt, allu	
8th	US$8,500	mousesports	9-13	278-298	-20	27	denis, gob b, nex, chrisJ, NiKo	
9th	US$7,000	Virtus.pro	8-14	257-322	-65	24	byali, NEO, pashaBiceps, Snax, TaZ	kuben
10th	US$5,500	SK Gaming	6-16	256-304	-48	18	AcillioN, cadiaN, Friis, Magiskb0y, MODDII	
11th	US$4,000	HellRaisers	6-16	256-304	-61	18	ANGE1, kUcheR, oskar, schenider, STYKO	
12th	US$2,500	PENTA Sports	5-17	213-318	-105	15	kRYSTAL, Spiidi, strux1, tabseN, tahsiN	

== Finals ==
The finalized teams are shown below. Each team's world ranking for December 8, 2015 is also shown.

North America

- Team Liquid (9)
- Luminosity Gaming (7)
- Conquest (16)
- Counter Logic Gaming (13)

Europe

- ? (3)
- Fnatic (1)
- Natus Vincere (5)
- Team EnVyUs (2)

=== Broadcast Talent ===
Host

- Alex "Machine" Richardson

Commentators

- Anders Blume
- Sean "sgares" Gares
- Corey "Megaman" Gilbert
- Robin "Fifflaren" Johansson
- Auguste "Semmler" Massonnat
- John "BLU" Mullen
- Jason "moses" O'Toole
- Lauren "Pansy" Scott
- Matthew "Sadokist" Trivett

Observers

- Heather "sapphiRe" Garrozo

=== Group stage ===
==== Group A ====
Pos	Team	W	L	RF	RA	RD	Pts
1	Team EnVyUs	2	0	64	36	+28	6
2	Fnatic	2	1	81	68	+13	6
3	Team Liquid	1	2	85	93	-8	3
4	Conquest	0	2	43	76	-33	0

Group A Matches
Team Liquid	0	2	Team EnVyUs
Fnatic	2	0	Conquest
Fnatic	0	2	Team EnVyUs
Team Liquid	2	1	Conquest
Fnatic	2	0	Team Liquid

Group A Scores

Group A Scores
Team	Score	Map	Score	Team
Team Liquid	14	Cobblestone	16	Team EnVyUs
Team Liquid	5	Cache	16	Team EnVyUs
Team Liquid	–	Mirage	–	Team EnVyUs
Fnatic	16	Mirage	4	Conquest
Fnatic	16	Inferno	10	Conquest
Fnatic	–	Cache	–	Conquest
Fnatic	11	Cobblestone	16	Team EnVyUs
Fnatic	6	Inferno	16	Team EnVyUs
Fnatic	–	Mirage	–	Team EnVyUs
Team Liquid	12	Inferno	16	Conquest
Team Liquid	16	Cache	7	Conquest
Team Liquid	16	Overpass	6	Conquest
Fnatic	16	Cache	14	Tean Liquid
Fnatic	16	Mirage	8	Tean Liquid
Fnatic	–	Dust II	–	Team Liquid

==== Group B ====
Pos	Team	W	L	RF	RA	RD	Pts
1	?	2	0	64	43	+21	6
2	Natus Vincere	2	1	104	85	+19	6
3	Luminosity Gaming	1	2	85	96	-11	3
4	Counter Logic Gaming	0	2	38	64	-26	0

Group B Matches
?	2	0	Counter Logic Gaming
Luminosity Gaming	0	2	Natus Vincere
?	2	0	Natus Vincere
Luminosity Gaming	2	0	Counter Logic Gaming
Natus Vincere	2	1	Luminosity Gaming

Group B Scores

Group B Scores
Team	Score	Map	Score	Team
?	16	Mirage	12	Counter Logic Gaming
?	16	Infenro	6	Counter Logic Gaming
?	–	Train	–	Counter Logic Gaming
Luminosity Gaming	5	Dust II	16	Natus Vincere
Luminosity Gaming	15	Inferno	19	Natus Vincere
Luminosity Gaming	–	Overpass	–	Natus Vincere
?	16	Train	12	Natus Vincere
?	16	Inferno	13	Natus Vincere
?	–	Mirage	–	Natus Vincere
Luminosity Gaming	16	Mirage	8	Counter Logic Gaming
Luminosity Gaming	16	Overpass	12	Counter Logic Gaming
Luminosity Gaming	–	Cache	–	Counter Logic Gaming
Natus Vincere	16	Cobblestone	11	Luminosity Gaming
Natus Vincere	12	Cobblestone	16	Luminosity Gaming
Natus Vincere	16	Mirage	6	Luminosity Gaming

=== Playoffs ===
==== Bracket ====
Semifinals
Team EnVyUs	0
Natus Vincere	2
?	0
Fnatic	2

Finals
Natus Vincere	2
Fnatic	3

==== Semifinals ====
Semifinals
Team	Score	Map	Score	Team
Team EnVyUs	9	Dust II	16	Natus Vincere
Team EnVyUs	18	Cobblestone	22	Natus Vincere
Team EnVyUs	–	Mirage	–	Natus Vincere
?	12	Inferno	16	Fnatic
?	14	Mirage	16	Fnatic
?	–	Dust II	–	Fnatic

==== Finals ====
Finals
Team	Score	Map	Score	Team
Natus Vincere	14	Inferno	16	Fnatic
Natus Vincere	14	Dust II	16	Fnatic
Natus Vincere	16	Mirage	6	Fnatic
Natus Vincere	16	Train	14	Fnatic
Natus Vincere	6	Cobblestone	16	Fnatic

=== Finals Standings ===
Final Standings
Place	Prize Money	Team	Roster	Coach
1st	US$100,000	Fnatic	dennis, flusha, KRiMZ, JW, olofmeister	vuggo
2nd	US$60,000	Natus Vincere	Edward, flamie, GuardiaN, seized, Zeus	starix
3rd – 4th	US$25,000	?	cajunb, dev1ce, dupreeh, karrigan, Xyp9x	
3rd – 4th	US$25,000	Team EnVyUs	apEX, Happy, kennyS, kioShiMa, NBK-	Next
5th – 6th	US$12,500	Luminosity Gaming	coldzera, FalleN, fer, fnx, TACO	zews
5th – 6th	US$12,500	Team Liquid	adreN, ELiGE, FugLy, Hiko, m0E, nitr0	GBJame^s
7th – 8th	US$7,500	Conquest	daps, NAF, stanislaw, RUSH, ShahZaM	
7th – 8th	US$7,500	Counter Logic Gaming	hazed, jdm64, reltuC, tarik, FNS	

Between the end of the online season and the start of the finals, an unexpected number of changes took place.

The players of Team SoloMid opted out of their contracts, leaving the players without a team. Before the players started their own organization, which would be called Astralis, the team played under the name "?", which is pronounced "Question Mark."

Team EnVyUs pick up a new coach, Jordan "Next" Savelli.

Jonathan "EliGE" Jablonowski had final exams for his high school on the first day of finals, so Team Liquid brought in former Counter-Strike: Source professional turned streamer Mohamad "m0E" Assad as a replacement in Liquid's match against EnVyUs.

Luminosity Gaming replaced Ricardo "boltz" Prass, Lucas "steel" Lopes, and Renato "nak" Nakano and brought up Lincoln "fnx" Lau, Epitácio "TACO" de Melo, and Wilton "zews" Prado from Games Academy, an organization FalleN is the owner of.
