= ESL Pro League Season 4 =

Esports league season

ESL Pro League
- 2016

Tournament information
- Sport: Counter-Strike: Global Offensive
- Location: São Paulo, Brazil
- Dates: August 17, 2016–October 30, 2016
- Administrator: Electronic Sports League (ESL)
- Teams: 28 teams
- Purse: US$750,000

Final positions
- Champions: Cloud9
- 1st runners-up: SK Gaming
- 2nd runners-up: mousesports Ninjas in Pyjamas
- MVP: Timothy "autimatic" Ta

ESL Pro League Season 4 (shortened as EPL Season 4) was a Counter-Strike: Global Offensive tournament run by ESL. It was the fourth season of the ESL Pro League, and had an overall prize pool of $750,000 . For the first time, the Finals took place in South America – São Paulo, Brazil, from October 28 to October 30. Teams from two continents, North America and Europe competed in fourteen team leagues to attempt to qualify for the Finals. Europe's season began with FaZe Clan defeating Team X (which later formed into Heroic) and ended with Team Dignitas defeating Virtus.pro in a best of three 6th place decider. North America's season started with Cloud9 defeating Team Liquid and ended with Immortals defeating Echo Fox. In the finals, Cloud9 defeated SK Gaming 2–1 to become the ESL Pro League Season 4 Champions and take home $200,000 prize money; this upset would also mark the first time a North American won an international premier event since iBUYPOWER won ESEA Season 16 - Global Invite Division in 2014.

== Format ==
The format was slightly different to the previous renditions of the tournament.

Each continent featured the top 11 teams from ESL Pro League Season 3, one team from the ESEA Season 21: Premier Division Qualifier, one team from the ESL Pro League Season 3 Relegation, and one team from the Wild Card Qualifier. Teams within each continent played each other twice to determine the top four qualifiers to the Finals in Brazil. There was a total of nine weeks in this phase of the tournament. All games were played online.

Teams that placed seventh to eleventh are automatically invited to next season's ESL Pro League. 12th and 13th place are invited to Season 4's Relegation and 14th place will be placed in the ESEA Premier Season 24.

The Finals consisted of twelve teams, six from Europe and six from North America. These teams were separated into two groups. The group stage consisted of every team in each group playing against each other. The top three teams in each group moved on to the Playoffs. The knockout stages were a best of three format. All games in the Finals were played offline. The top team in each group received a bye and automatically moved onto the Semifinals. The other four teams played in the Round of Six. The winners of those two games moved on to the Semifinals, and the winner of the Semifinals moved onto the Finals.

== Teams ==
North America

- SK Gaming (Season 3 #1)
- Cloud9 (Season 3 Top #2)
- OpTic Gaming (Season 3 #3)
- Team Liquid (Season 3 #4)
- NRG eSports (Season 3 Top #5)
- Selfless Gaming (Season 3 #6)
- Renegades (Season 3 #7)
- Winterfox (Season 3 #8)
- Splyce (Season 3 #9)
- Counter Logic Gaming (Season 3 #10)
- compLexity Gaming (Season 3 #11)
- Immortals (ESEA Premier Season 21)
- eUnited (Season 3 Relegation)
- Echo Fox (Wild Card)

Europe

- Ninjas in Pyjamas (Season 3 #1)
- Astralis (Season 3 #2)
- Fnatic (Season 3 #3)
- G2 Esports (Season 3 #4)
- Natus Vincere (Season 3 #5)
- Team Dignitas (Season 3 #6)
- FaZe Clan (Season 3 #7)
- mousesports (Season 3 #8)
- Team EnVyUs (Season 3 #9)
- Heroic (Season 3 #10)
- Flipsid3 Tactics (Season 3 #11)
- HellRaisers (ESEA Premier Season 21)
- PENTA Sports (Season 3 Relegation)
- Virtus.pro (Wild Card)

== North America ==
=== Broadcast Talent ===
Host

- Tom "Tsquared" Taylor

Commentators

- Sam "DaZeD" Marine
- John "BLU" Mullen
- Jason "moses" O'Toole

Analysts

- Steve "Ryu" Rattacasa
- Erik "da_bears" Stromberg

Observers

- Heather "sapphiRe" Garozzo
- DJ "Prius" Kuntz

=== Standings ===
The final standings are shown below. Each team's in-game leader is shown first. The rosters that are shown are the rosters that were in place by the end of the season. For instance, Skyler "Relyks" Weaver left eUnited in the middle of the season and was replaced with Jacob "kaboose" McDonald. Thus, kaboose's name is shown below and Relyks's name is not shown.

North America Final Standings
| Place | Prize Money | Team | W-L | RF-RA | RD | Pts | Roster |
|---|---|---|---|---|---|---|---|
| 1st | TBD | Cloud9 | 25-1 | 383-225 | +158 | 75 | Stewie2k, autimatic, n0thing, Skadoodle, shroud |
| 2nd | TBD | Immortals | 20-6 | 385-234 | +151 | 60 | zews, boltz, felps, HEN1, LUCAS1 |
| 3rd | TBD | SK Gaming | 18-8 | 341-225 | +116 | 54 | FalleN, coldzera, fer, fnx, TACO |
| 4th | TBD | OpTic Gaming | 17-9 | 376-306 | +70 | 51 | stanislaw, NAF, tarik, RUSH, mixwell |
| 5th | US$18,000 | Renegades | 17-9 | 371-271 | +100 | 51 | AZR, jks, Yam, USTILO, Rickeh |
| 6th | TBD | NRG Esports | 17-9 | 344-278 | +76 | 51 | gob b, LEGIJA, tabseN, FugLy, ptr |
| 7th | TBD | Team Liquid | 15-11 | 370-318 | +52 | 45 | Hiko, EliGE, jdm64, nitr0, Pimp |
| 8th | US$15,500 | Echo Fox | 13-13 | 337-353 | -16 | 39 | sgares, fREAKAZOiD, roca, ryx, ShahZam |
| 9th | US$13,000 | Counter Logic Gaming | 10-16 | 288-377 | -89 | 30 | reltuC, hazed, koosta, nahtE, Subroza |
| 10th | US$10,500 | Winterfox | 9-17 | 273-364 | -93 | 27 | emagine, apoc, dexter, ofnu, zewsy |
| 11th | US$8,000 | compLexity Gaming | 9-17 | 269-377 | -108 | 27 | Uber, androidx23, APE, dephh, Surreal |
| 12th | US$5,500 | Selfless Gaming | 7-19 | 302-387 | -85 | 21 | Nifty, Brehze, kaboose, mitch, no_one |
| 13th | US$3,000 | Splyce | 3-23 | 240-402 | -162 | 9 | arya, AcillioN, CRUC1AL, DAVEY, Machinegun |
| 14th | US$1,500 | eUnited | 2-24 | 239-409 | -170 | 6 | shinobi, a2z, cJ, Marved, vice |

North America Results

Results
| | SK | C9 | OpTic | Liquid | NRG | SLF | RNG | WFX | SPY | CLG | coL | IMT | eU | FOX |
|---|---|---|---|---|---|---|---|---|---|---|---|---|---|---|
| SK | | FF-W; FF-W | 16-8; 19-15 | 10-16; 13-16 | 16-14; 16-7 | 16-9; 16-7 | 12-16; 0-16 | W-FF; W-FF | 16-10; 16-6 | 16-7; 16-4 | 16-7; 16-1 | 11-16; 4-16 | 16-8; 16-3 | 16-12; 16-11 |
| C9 | W-FF; W-FF | | 16-3; 16-12 | 16-8; 16-10 | 16-5; 16-10 | 16-12; 16-12 | 16-12; 19-16 | 16-11; 16-7 | 16-13; 16-2 | 16-11; 16-10 | 16-9; 16-5 | 16-5; 16-14 | 16-6; 16-8 | 12-16; 16-8 |
| OpTic | 8-16; 15-19 | 3-16; 12-16 | | 3-16; 20-22 | 16-10; 12-16 | 16-13; 22-20 | 16-13; 12-16 | 16-8; 16-6 | 16-8; 16-9 | 16-9; 16-5 | 16-4; 16-6 | 13-16; 16-12 | 16-2; 16-12 | 16-5; 16-11 |
| Liquid | 16-10; 16-13 | 8-16; 10-16 | 16-3; 22-20 | | 14-16; 7-16 | 13-16; 16-6 | 10-16; 12-16 | 16-14; 16-11 | 16-8; 16-6 | 16-5; 12-16 | 16-11; 16-7 | 16-12; 12-16 | 16-2; 16-11 | 10-16; 16-19 |
| NRG | 14-16; 7-16 | 5-16; 10-16 | 10-16; 16-12 | 16-14; 16-7 | | 16-5; 16-5 | 9-16; 16-10 | 16-5; 16-5 | 16-4; 16-8 | 14-16; 16-9 | 16-10; 16-4 | 6-16; 7-16 | 16-8; 16-8 | 16-11; 16-9 |
| SLF | 9-16; 7-16 | 12-16; 12-16 | 13-16; 20-22 | 13-16; 6-16 | 5-16; 5-16 | | 13-16; 10-16 | 16-13; 16-19 | 16-13; 16-14 | 15-19; 16-5 | 9-16; 16-7 | 1-16; 8-16 | 12-16; 16-6 | 13-16; 14-16 |
| RNG | 16-12; 16-0 | 12-16; 16-19 | 13-16; 16-12 | 16-10; 16-12 | 16-9; 10-16 | 16-3; 16-10 | | 16-3; 16-8 | 16-6; 16-3 | 16-2; 9-16 | 10-16; 16-8 | 2-16; 13-16 | 16-5; 16-13 | 16-8; 14-16 |
| WFX | FF-W; FF-W | 11-16; 7-16 | 8-16; 6-16 | 14-16; 11-16 | 5-16; 5-16 | 13-16; 19-16 | 3-16; 8-16 | | 16-13; 16-7 | 16-11; 16-13 | 16-1; 14-16 | 7-16; 1-16 | 16-12; 16-11 | 11-16; 16-8 |
| SPY | 10-16; 6-16 | 13-16; 2-16 | 8-16; 9-16 | 8-16; 6-16 | 4-16; 8-16 | 13-16; 14-16 | 6-16; 3-16 | 13-16; 7-16 | | 9-16; 15-19 | 16-14; 11-16 | 7-16; 4-16 | 16-14; 16-3 | 10-16; 6-16 |
| CLG | 7-16; 4-16 | 11-16; 10-16 | 9-16; 5-16 | 5-16; 16-12 | 16-14; 9-16 | 19-15; 5-16 | 2-16; 16-9 | 11-16; 13-16 | 16-9; 19-15 | | 16-9; 8-16 | 8-16; 3-16 | 16-10; 16-14 | 16-14; 12-16 |
| coL | 7-16; 1-16 | 9-16; 5-16 | 4-16; 6-16 | 11-16; 7-16 | 10-16; 4-16 | 16-9; 7-16 | 16-10; 8-16 | 11-16; 16-14 | 14-16; 16-11 | 9-16; 16-8 | | 7-16; 16-12 | 16-11; 19-15 | 9-16; 19-15 |
| IMT | 16-11; 16-4 | 5-16; 14-16 | 16-13; 12-16 | 12-16; 16-12 | 16-6; 16-7 | 16-1; 16-8 | 16-2; 16-13 | 16-7; 16-1 | 16-7; 16-4 | 16-8; 16-3 | 16-7; 12-16 | | 16-10; 10-16 | 16-10; 16-4 |
| eU | 8-16; 3-16 | 6-16; 8-16 | 2-16; 12-16 | 2-16; 11-16 | 8-16; 8-16 | 16-12; 6-16 | 5-16; 13-16 | 12-16; 11-16 | 14-16; 3-16 | 10-16; 14-16 | 11-16; 15-19 | 10-16; 16-10 | | 7-16; 8-16 |
| FOX | 12-16; 11-16 | 12-16; 8-16 | 5-16; 11-16 | 16-10; 19-16 | 11-16; 9-16 | 16-13; 16-14 | 8-16; 16-14 | 16-11; 8-16 | 16-10; 16-6 | 14-16; 16-12 | 16-9; 15-19 | 10-16; 4-16 | 16-7; 16-8 | |

== Europe ==
=== Broadcast Talent ===
Host

- Alex "Machine" Richardson

Commentators

- Henry "HenryG" Greer
- Mitch "Uber" Leslie
- Lauren "Pansy" Scott
- Matthew "Sadokist" Trivett

Analyst

- Janko "YNk" Paunović

Observers

- Alex "Rushly" Rush

=== Standings ===
The final standings are shown below. Each team's in-game leader is shown first. The rosters shown reflect the rosters as they were by the end of the season. For instance, Timothée "DEVIL" Démolon was replaced with Christophe "SIXER" Xia on Team EnVyUS midway through the season. Therefore, SIXER's name is shown instead of DEVIL's.

Europe Final Standings
| Place | Prize Money | Team | W-L | RF-RA | RD | Pts | Roster |
|---|---|---|---|---|---|---|---|
| 1st | – | Fnatic | 19-7 | 401-322 | +79 | 57 | wenton, olofmeister, twist, dennis, Lekr0 |
| 2nd | – | Ninjas in Pyjamas | 19-7 | 387-282 | +105 | 57 | Xizt, f0rest, friberg, GeT RiGhT, disco doplan |
| 3rd | – | mousesports | 18-8 | 381-304 | +77 | 54 | denis, Spiidi, chrisJ, IoWel, NiKo |
| 4th | – | FaZe Clan | 18-8 | 378-350 | +28 | 54 | karrigan^{1}, allu, aizy, jkaem, rain |
| 5th | – | Team EnVyUs | 16-10 | 337-301 | +36 | 48 | Happy, apEX, kennyS, NBK-, SIXER |
| 6th | – | Team Dignitas | 14-12 | 359-327 | +32 | 42 | MSL, cajunb, k0nfig, Magiskb0Y, RUBINO |
| 7th | US$18,000 | Virtus.pro | 14-12 | 334-339 | -5 | 42 | NEO, byali, pashaBiceps, Snax, TaZ |
| 8th | US$15,500 | Natus Vincere | 13-13 | 330-344 | -14 | 39 | seized, Edward, flamie, s1mple, GuardiaN |
| 9th | US$13,000 | G2 Esports | 13-13 | 354-346 | +8 | 39 | shox, bodyy, Rpk, SmithZz, ScreaM |
| 10th | US$10,500 | Astralis | 12-14 | 353-335 | +18 | 36 | karrigan^{1}, dev1ce, dupreeh, Kjaerbye, Xyp9x |
| 11th | US$8,000 | Hellraisers | 9-16 | 321-352 | -31 | 27 | ANGE1, bondik, Deadfox, STYKO, Zero |
| 12th | US$5,500 | Heroic | 8-18 | 316-375 | -59 | 24 | Snappi, Friis, gla1ve, valde, MODDII |
| 13th | US$3,000 | PENTA Sports | 5-21 | 291-410 | -119 | 15 | kRTSYAL, tahsiN, stfN, mikeS, weber |
| 14th | US$1,500 | FlipSid3 Tactics | 4-22 | 226-378 | -152 | 12 | Blad3, electronic, markeloff, WorldEdit, waylander |

Europe Results

Results
| | NiP | Astralis | Fnatic | G2 | Na'Vi | dig | FaZe | mouz | nV | Heroic | F3 | HR | PENTA | VP |
|---|---|---|---|---|---|---|---|---|---|---|---|---|---|---|
| NiP | | 16-14; 7-16 | 14-16; 9-16 | 16-10; 16-5 | 8-16; 16-11 | 16-8; 10-16 | 16-3; 16-12 | 16-13; 16-5 | 15-19; 16-6 | 16-14; 16-8 | 16-1; 16-7 | 19-16; 16-11 | 16-7; 16-5 | 16-8; 17-19 |
| Astralis | 14-16; 16-7 | | 13-16; 19-17 | 4-16; 14-16 | 7-16; 6-16 | 16-10; 16-6 | 16-19; 16-11 | 10-16; 2-16 | 14-16; 16-3 | 13-16; 13-16 | 6-16; 16-12 | 16-13; 16-8 | 14-16; 16-5 | 14-16; 14-16 |
| Fnatic | 16-14; 16-9 | 16-13; 17-19 | | 13-16; 16-8 | 16-3; 16-6 | 11-16; 9-16 | 9-16; 22-18 | 16-12; 16-14 | 14-16; 16-8 | 16-14; 16-12 | 16-2; 16-9 | 19-17; 15-19 | 16-11; 16-12 | 16-14; 16-8 |
| G2 | 10-16; 5-16 | 16-4; 16-14 | 16-13; 8-16 | | 12-16; 11-16 | 16-13; 14-16 | 12-16; 12-16 | 11-16; 16-6 | 14-16; 6-16 | 19-16; 12-16 | 16-12; 16-6 | 16-5; 16-9 | 16-11; 16-14 | 16-19; 16-12 |
| Na'Vi | 16-8; 11-16 | 16-7; 16-6 | 3-16; 6-16 | 16-12; 16-11 | | 8-16; 14-16 | 23-25; 15-19 | 16-8; 13-16 | 17-19; 16-10 | 4-16; 16-7 | 16-12; 16-7 | 7-16; 5-16 | 19-17; 16-7 | 3-16; 16-9 |
| dig | 8-16; 16-10 | 10-16; 6-16 | 16-11; 16-9 | 13-16; 16-14 | 16-8; 16-4 | | 4-16; 17-19 | 14-16; 14-16 | 12-16; 9-16 | 16-3; 16-12 | 16-5; 16-9 | 18-22; 19-17 | 16-10; 16-7 | 7-16; 16-7 |
| FaZe | 3-16; 12-16 | 19-16; 11-16 | 16-9; 18-22 | 16-12; 16-12 | 25-23; 19-15 | 16-4; 19-17 | | 6-16; 3-16 | 6-16; 16-10 | 16-13; 16-5 | 16-14; 7-16 | 16-14; 16-11 | 22-18; 16-10 | 16-8; 16-5 |
| mouz | 13-16; 5-16 | 10-16; 16-2 | 12-16; 14-16 | 16-11; 6-16 | 8-16; 16-13 | 16-14; 16-14 | 16-6; 16-3 | | 16-9; 16-9 | 16-14; 16-4 | 16-4; 16-9 | 16-8; 16-12 | 16-11; 16-13 | 16-8; 25-28 |
| nV | 19-15; 6-16 | 16-14; 3-16 | 16-14; 8-16 | 16-14; 16-6 | 19-17; 10-16 | 16-12; 16-9 | 16-6; 10-16 | 9-16; 9-16 | | 16-7; 10-16 | 16-4; 16-5 | 16-9; 16-10 | 16-10; 16-5 | FF-W^{2} 10-16 |
| Heroic | 14-16; 8-16 | 16-13; 16-13 | 14-16; 12-16 | 16-19; 16-12 | 16-4; 16-7 | 3-16; 12-16 | 13-16; 5-16 | 14-16; 4-16 | 7-16; 16-10 | | 7-16; 16-9 | 14-16; 16-6 | 16-19; 16-14 | 12-16; 10-16 |
| F3 | 1-16; 7-16 | 6-16; 12-16 | 2-16; 9-16 | 12-16; 6-16 | 12-16; 7-16 | 5-16; 9-16 | 14-16; 16-7 | 4-16; 9-16 | 4-16; 5-16 | 16-7; 9-16 | | 7-16; 3-16 | 14-16; 16-7 | 16-5; 5-16 |
| HR | 16-19; 11-16 | 13-16; 8-16 | 17-19; 19-15 | 5-16; 9-16 | 16-7; 16-5 | 22-18; 17-19 | 14-16; 11-16 | 8-16; 12-16 | 9-16; 10-16 | 16-14; 6-16 | 16-7; 16-3 | | 11-16; 16-7 | 16-14; 7-16 |
| PENTA | 7-16; 5-16 | 16-14; 5-16 | 11-16; 12-16 | 11-16; 14-16 | 17-19; 7-16 | 10-16; 7-16 | 18-22; 10-16 | 11-16; 13-16 | 10-16; 5-16 | 19-16; 14-16 | 16-14; 7-16 | 16-11; 7-16 | | 7-16; 16-7 |
| VP | 8-16; 19-17 | 16-14; 16-14 | 14-16; 8-16 | 19-16; 12-16 | 16-3; 9-16 | 16-7; 7-16 | 8-16; 5-16 | 8-16; 28-25 | W-FF^{1} 16-10 | 16-12; 16-10 | 5-16; 16-5 | 14-16; 16-7 | 16-7; 10-16 | |

Team Dignitas vs. Virtus.pro Tie-breaker
| Team | Score | Map | Score | Team |
|---|---|---|---|---|
| Team Dignitas | 16 | Nuke | 5 | Virtus.pro |
| Team Dignitas | 16 | Cobblestone | 12 | Virtus.pro |
| Team Dignitas | – | Mirage | – | Virtus.pro |

^{1}Finn "karrigan" Andersen was on the Astralis until the end of the regular season. However, FaZe Clan acquired the Danish in-game leader before the São Paulo Finals. Since Astralis did not qualify for the Finals and FaZe did, karrigan's name is shown in both Astralis's and FaZe's rosters.

^{2}Team EnVyUs was forced to forfeit its first map to Virtus.pro as two of its players could not log on to their accounts. The second map was played as normal.

== Finals ==
The finalized teams are shown below. Each team's world ranking for October 24, 2016 is also shown.

North America

- Cloud9 (7)
- Immortals (13)
- SK Gaming (3)
- OpTic Gaming (11)
- NRG Esports (25)
- Team Liquid (8)

Europe

- Fnatic (9)
- Ninjas in Pyjamas (6)
- mousesports (14)
- FaZe Clan (15)
- Team EnVyUs (10)
- Team Dignitas (2)

=== Broadcast Talent ===
Host

- Beatriz "Bia" Bauer

Desk Host

- Alex "Machine" Richardson

Commentators

- Henry "HenryG" Greer
- John "BLU" Mullen
- Jason "moses" O'Toole
- Matthew "Sadokist" Trivett

Analysts

- Chad "SPUNJ" Burchill
- Janko "YNk" Paunović
- Luis "peacemaker" Tadeu

Observers

- Heather "sapphiRe" Garozzo
- Davis DJ "Prius" Kuntz
- Alex "Rushly" Rush

=== Group stage ===
==== Group A ====
| Pos | Team | W | L | RF | RA | RD |
|---|---|---|---|---|---|---|
| 1 | mousesports | 3 | 1 | 62 | 47 | +15 |
| 2 | Team EnVyUs | 3 | 1 | 57 | 30 | +27 |
| 3 | OpTic Gaming | 2 | 2 | 47 | 38 | +9 |
| 4 | Team Liquid^{1} | 1 | 3 | 34 | 62 | -28 |
| 5 | Immortals | 1 | 3 | 41 | 60 | -19 |
| 6 | Fnatic^{2} | 0 | 0 | 0 | 0 | 0 |

Group A matches
| Team | Score | Map | Score | Team |
|---|---|---|---|---|
| OpTic Gaming | 16 | Train | 2 | Team Liquid |
| Immortals | 5 | Cobblestone | 16 | Team EnVyUs |
| mousesports | 16 | Mirage | 12 | Team Liquid |
| Immortals | 4 | Cobblestone | 16 | OpTic Gaming |
| Team EnVyUs | 16 | Dust II | 4 | Team Liquid |
| mousesports | 16 | Cache | 10 | OpTic Gaming |
| Immortals | 16 | Mirage | 14 | mousesports |
| OpTic Gaming | 5 | Cobblestone | 16 | Team EnVyUs |
| Immortals | 14 | Mirage | 16 | Team Liquid |
| mousesports | 16 | Cache | 9 | Team EnVyUs |

^{1}Team Liquid takes Renegades's spot in the EPL Finals due to Renegades opting out of the trip to Brazil and instead headed to play in the ELEAGUE Major 2017 Asia Minor in Johor Bahru, Malaysia.

^{2} Fnatic withdraw from the tournament due to personal problems

==== Group B ====
| Pos | Team | W | L | RF | RA | RD |
|---|---|---|---|---|---|---|
| 1 | SK Gaming | 4 | 1 | 74 | 35 | +41 |
| 2 | Cloud9 | 4 | 1 | 54 | 48 | +6 |
| 3 | Ninjas in Pyjamas | 3 | 2 | 71 | 63 | +8 |
| 4 | FaZe Clan | 2 | 3 | 61 | 75 | -14 |
| 5 | Team Dignitas | 2 | 3 | 46 | 49 | -3 |
| 6 | NRG Esports | 0 | 5 | 56 | 86 | -30 |

Group B matches
| Team | Score | Map | Score | Team |
|---|---|---|---|---|
| Cloud9 | 16 | Dust II | 14 | FaZe Clan |
| NRG Esports | 3 | Mirage | 16 | Team Dignitas |
| Ninjas in Pyjamas | 16 | Cobblestone | 10 | SK Gaming |
| Cloud9 | 16 | Cache | 9 | NRG Esports |
| Ninjas in Pyjamas | 14 | Nuke | 16 | Team Dignitas |
| SK Gaming | 16 | Overpass | 2 | FaZe Clan |
| Ninjas in Pyjamas | 16 | Cache | 14 | NRG Esports |
| FaZe Clan | 16 | Mirage | 7 | Team Dignitas |
| Cloud9 | 6 | Dust II | 16 | SK Gaming |
| FaZe Clan | 22 | Dust II | 20 | NRG Esports |
| SK Gaming | 16 | Cobblestone | 7 | Team Dignitas |
| Cloud9 | 16 | Dust II | 9 | Ninjas in Pyjamas |
| SK Gaming | 16 | Cobblestone | 10 | NRG Esports |
| Cloud9 | 16 | Mirage | 13 | Team Dignitas |
| Ninjas in Pyjamas | 16 | Overpass | 7 | FaZe Clan |

=== Playoffs ===
==== Bracket ====
Round of 6
Cloud9 | 2
OpTic Gaming | 0
Team EnVyUs | 0
Ninjas in Pyjamas | 2

Semifinals
mousesports | 0
Cloud9 | 2
SK Gaming | 2
Ninjas in Pyjamas | 1

Finals
Cloud9 | 2
SK Gaming | 1

==== Round of 6 Scores ====
Round of 6
| Team | Score | Map | Score | Team |
|---|---|---|---|---|
| Cloud9 | 16 | Dust II | 12 | OpTic Gaming |
| Cloud9 | 16 | Cobblestone | 2 | OpTic Gaming |
| Cloud9 | – | Overpass | – | OpTic Gaming |
| Team EnVyUs | 9 | Nuke | 16 | Ninjas in Pyjamas |
| Team EnVyUs | 17 | Dust II | 19 | Ninjas in Pyjamas |
| Team EnVyUs | – | Nuke | – | Ninjas in Pyjamas |

==== Semifinals Scores ====
Semifinals
| Team | Score | Map | Score | Team |
|---|---|---|---|---|
| mousesports | 9 | Cobblestone | 16 | Cloud9 |
| mousesports | 10 | Mirage | 16 | Cloud9 |
| mousesports | – | Dust II | – | Cloud9 |
| SK Gaming | 10 | Nuke | 16 | Ninjas in Pyjamas |
| SK Gaming | 16 | Overpass | 7 | Ninjas in Pyjamas |
| SK Gaming | 16 | Cobblestone | 10 | Ninjas in Pyjamas |

==== Finals Scores ====
Finals
| Team | Score | Map | Score | Team |
|---|---|---|---|---|
| Cloud9 | 17 | Overpass | 19 | SK Gaming |
| Cloud9 | 16 | Mirage | 6 | SK Gaming |
| Cloud9 | 16 | Dust II | 5 | SK Gaming |

=== Finals standings ===
Final Standings
| Place | Prize Money | Team |
|---|---|---|
| 1st | US$200,000 | Cloud9 |
| 2nd | US$90,000 | SK Gaming |
| 3rd – 4th | US$45,000 | mousesports |
| 3rd – 4th | US$45,000 | Ninjas in Pyjamas |
| 5th – 6th | US$35,000 | OpTic Gaming |
| 5th – 6th | US$35,000 | Team EnVyUs |
| 7th – 8th | US$30,000 | Team Liquid |
| 7th – 8th | US$30,000 | FaZe Clan |
| 9th – 10th | US$25,000 | Immortals |
| 9th – 10th | US$25,000 | Team Dignitas |
| 11th – 12th | US$20,000 | Fnatic |
| 11th – 12th | US$20,000 | NRG Esports |
