= Pro League =

Pro League may also refer to various association football leagues:

- Belgian Pro League, the top tier of football in Belgium
- ESL Pro League, an international Counter-Strike: Global Offensive competition
- Men's FIH Pro League, an international men's field hockey competition
- Women's FIH Pro League, an international women's field hockey competition
- League of Legends Pro League, top tier of League of Legends in China
- Lega Pro, a third-tier football league in Italy
- Malagasy Pro League, the top tier of football in Madagascar
- Persian Gulf Pro League, the top tier of football in Iran
- Provincial League, a former football league in Thailand
- TT Pro League, the top tier of football in Trinidad and Tobago
- UAE Pro League, the top tier of football in the United Arab Emirates
- USL Pro, a third-tier football league in the United States
- Uzbekistan Pro League, the second football league in Uzbekistan

== See also ==
- Sports league
- Professional sports league organization
