= Shroud (gamer) =

Canadian streamer and former professional esports player (born 1994)

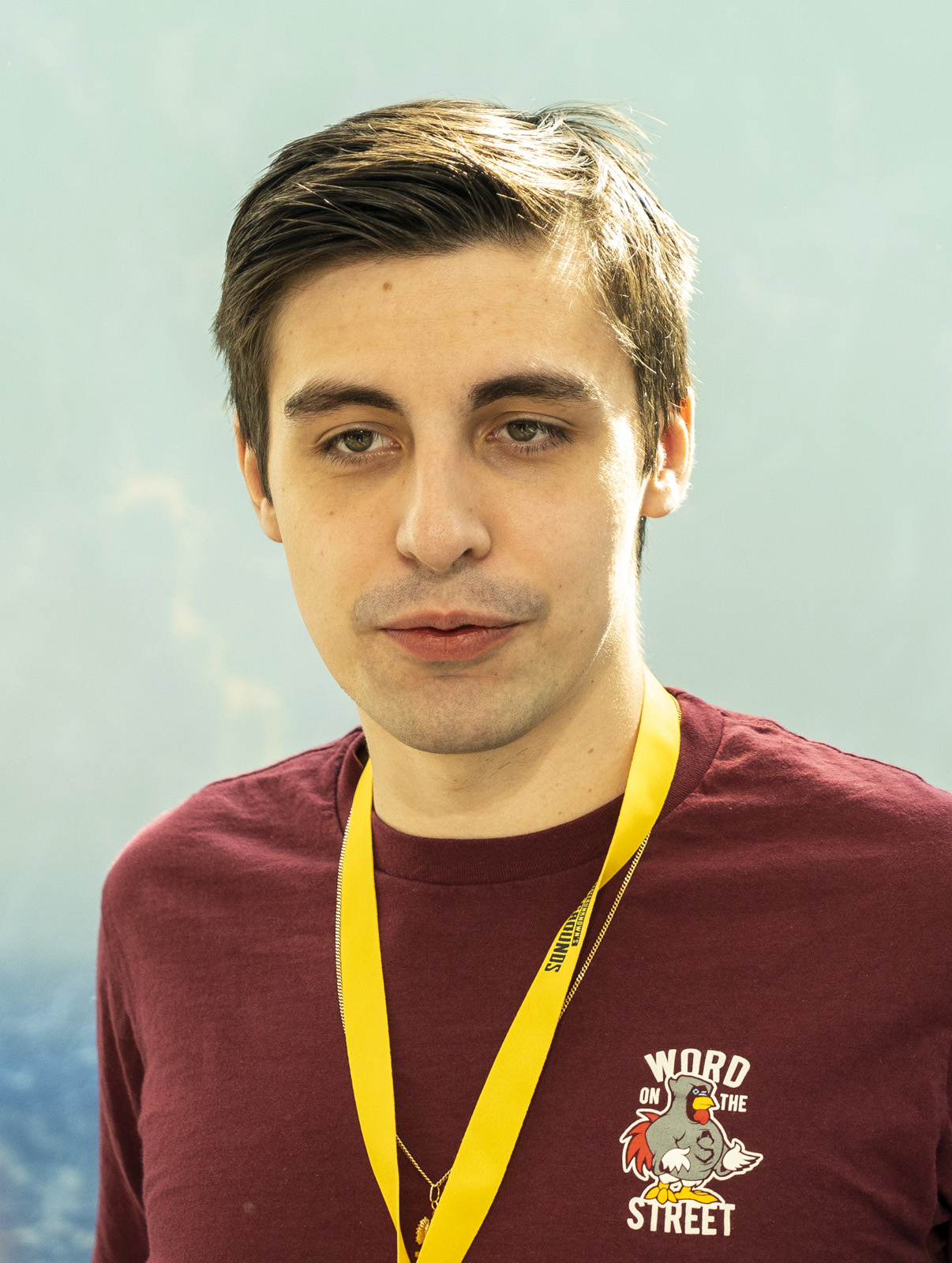
- Grzesiek in 2018

Personal information
- Name: Michael Grzesiek
- Born: June 2, 1994 (age 32); Toronto, Ontario, Canada

Career information
- Games: Counter-Strike: Global Offensive; Valorant; Counter-Strike 2
- Playing career: 2013–2017, 2022–present

Team history
- Counter-Strike: Global Offensive
- 2013–2014: Slow Motion
- 2014: Exertus eSports
- 2014: Manajuma
- 2014: compLexity Gaming
- 2014–2017: Cloud9
- Valorant
- 2022: Sentinels

Career highlights and awards
- EPL champion (2016)

Twitch information
- Channel: shroud
- Followers: 11.1 million

YouTube information
- Channel: Shroud
- Years active: 2014–present
- Subscribers: 6.83 million
- Views: 1.21 billion
- Last updated: 6 February 2025

Michael Grzesiek (born June 2, 1994), better known as Shroud (formerly mEclipse), is a Canadian streamer, YouTuber, former professional Valorant player, and formerly professional Counter-Strike: Global Offensive player. As of October 2025, his Twitch channel has 11.3 million followers and his YouTube channel has over 6.8 million subscribers.

== Career ==
=== Counter-Strike: Global Offensive ===
Grzesiek started his Counter-Strike: Global Offensive (CS:GO) career with several ESEA teams, particularly Exertus eSports and Manajuma. He was soon signed by compLexity Gaming as a stand-in, and later by Cloud9 in August 2014 when they acquired compLexity's roster. He helped lead Cloud9 to a first-place finish at ESL Pro League Season 4 in 2016. He stepped down from the starting roster in 2017 to move to full-time streaming for Cloud9.

=== Streaming and content creation ===
On April 18, 2018, Grzesiek left Cloud9 and officially retired from professional CS:GO.

On March 10, 2019, Grzesiek reached 100,000 Twitch subscribers, gaining another 14,000 the next day, making his subscriber count more than double the streamer with the second most at the time—TimTheTatman. He continued to stream full-time on Twitch until October 2019, when he announced his move from Twitch to Microsoft streaming platform Mixer. He would be broadcasting exclusively on Mixer, following the steps of fellow streamer Tyler "Ninja" Blevins, who announced a similar deal earlier that year. At The Game Awards 2019 he won Content Creator of the Year.

On June 22, 2020, Microsoft announced that it would be shutting down Mixer and instead partner with Facebook Gaming. It was alleged that Grzesiek received an offer from Facebook that would have financially exceeded that of Mixer. Grzesiek declined the offer and received the remainder of the current contract payout.

On August 11, 2020, Grzesiek announced that he would return to stream exclusively on Twitch. His first stream back the following day peaked at over 516,000 concurrent viewers.

At the inaugural edition of The Streamer Awards in 2022, Grzesiek won Gamer of the Year and was nominated for Best FPS streamer. At the February 2024 Streamer Awards, he was nominated for Gamer of the Year. At the December 2024 Streamer Awards, Grzesiek won the Legacy Award and was nominated for Best FPS Streamer.

=== Valorant ===
On July 8, 2022, Grzesiek signed with Sentinels as a player for their Valorant team for the North American Last Chance Qualifier for the 2022 Valorant Champions tournament. His opening match against The Guard, a 2-1 loss, had over 600,000 peak viewers, setting the record for a non-international level match that was only surpassed in March 2024. In the lower bracket, they eliminated Shopify Rebellion and were eliminated by 100 Thieves, who defeated The Guard in the LCQ finals.

=== Game development ===
In 2022 Grzesiek partnered with Mountaintop Studios with an initial investment to create 'Spectre Divide' as Lead Advisor and Investor. On February 25, 2025 the first season of the video game released and while the all-time peak on Steam was 26,232 players, the studio chose to shut down the game due to "performance" and ended April 12, 2025. CEO of Mountaintop Studios, Nate Mitchell stated "most of the funds of the video game was spent on getting the console release done for Season 1, the budget was consumed earlier than they forecasted."

== Personal life ==
Born in Toronto, Canada with Polish heritage, he has been living in the United States for several years. In 2021, he purchased a $9.4 million house in Los Angeles where he currently lives with his girlfriend, Hannah Kennedy, aka Bnans.

== Awards and nominations ==
Award	Year	Category	Result	Ref.
Esports Awards	2019	Streamer of the Year	Nominated	
Streamy Awards	2020	Live Streamer	Nominated	
Streamy Awards	2021	Live Streamer	Nominated	
The Game Awards	2017	Trending Gamer	Nominated	
The Game Awards	2019	Content Creator of the Year	Won	
The Streamer Awards	2021	Best FPS Streamer	Nominated	
The Streamer Awards	2021	Gamer of the Year	Won	
The Streamer Awards	2023	Gamer of the Year	Nominated	
The Streamer Awards	2024	Best FPS Streamer	Nominated	
The Streamer Awards	2024	Legacy award	Won	

== See also ==
- List of most-followed Twitch channels
