= N0thing =

American professional esports player

n0thing
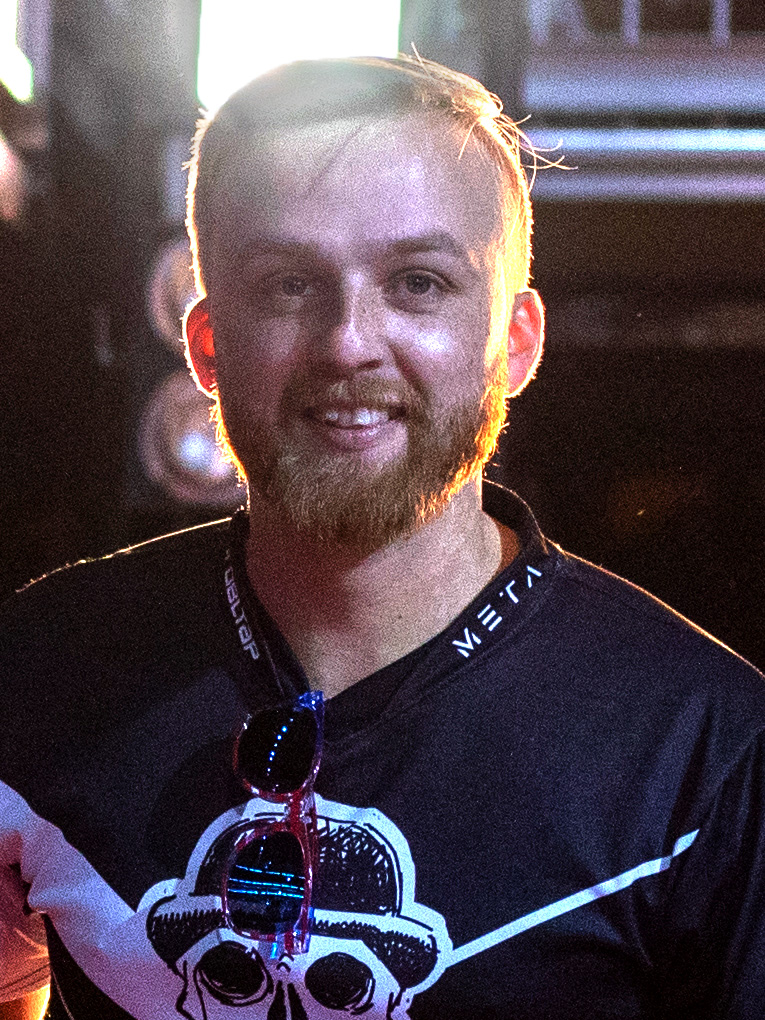
- n0thing at Intel Extreme Masters Chicago 2019

Personal information
- Name: Jordan Gilbert
- Born: October 25, 1990 (age 36)
- Nationality: American

Career information
- Games: Counter-Strike: Global Offensive
- Role: Structural artist / Support

Team history
- 2008–2012: Evil Geniuses
- 2013–2014: Complexity Gaming
- 2014–2017: Cloud9
- 2018–2018: Old Guys Club
- 2018–2019: Complexity Gaming (Stand-in)

Jordan Gilbert (born October 25, 1990), better known as n0thing (pronounced as "nothing"), is an American retired professional Counter-Strike: Global Offensive player. He previously played as a rifler/lurker for Cloud9. n0thing is one of the most experienced North American players. Before playing Global Offensive, n0thing was a professional Counter Strike 1.6 player. Jordan won his first LAN tournament at just 10 years old. Since then, he has grown into a major figure in the CS:GO scene. His large following has garnered him popularity outside the esports scene, even appearing on The Joe Rogan Experience.

== Career ==
=== Counter-Strike 1.6 ===
During Counter Strike 1.6, n0thing was best known as the star player on Evil Geniuses, who signed him in March 2008. He was nominated from the North American region as Best Newcomer in 2008, and the eSports Player of the Year in 2008 and 2009.

In 2011, he was named as the 11th best player of the previous year in a ranking by HLTV. This was based on his performance in 2010, which included leading his team to victory in seasons 5–7 of ESEA League's Invitational tournaments and finishing second at both Intel Extreme Masters American Championship Finals and the World Cyber Games's Pan-American Championship. During his time playing 1.6, n0thing was one of the players who participated in DirecTV's failed Championship Gaming Series.

=== Counter-Strike: Global Offensive ===
n0thing previously competed for CompLexity Gaming, an outfit acquired by Cloud9 on July 30, 2014. In the summer of 2015, n0thing's team made the grand finals of three tournaments in a month. After the departure of three of his teammates, including ingame leader Sgares, after that successful Summer 2015 run, n0thing stepped in as IGL until replaced by Slemmy before DreamHack Open Austin 2016.

In May 2016, n0thing had a highlight play against Luminosity Gaming in ELEAGUE Season 1's group stage final, where he snuck through a deployed smoke grenade, killed Luminosity's sniper with his pistol, and then picked up the dropped rifle to eliminate half of the enemy team. Although they lost the group stage finals 2–1, they advanced to the playoffs when Luminosity was subsequently disqualified.

In October 2016, n0thing's Cloud9 team became the first North American team since 2006 to win a major tournament, after they won ESL Pro League Season 4 and US$200,000 over SK Gaming. Despite n0thing having played Counter-Strike professionally for his entire adult life, it was his first time winning a major international CS:GO tournament.

In November 2016, n0thing's performance against OpTic Gaming at Dreamhack Winter 2016 led Cloud9 to 2-0 their North American counterparts and start their run in the loser's bracket.

In December 2016, n0thing's performance in the Americas Minor against Team SoloMid helped Cloud9 make the major qualifier for the ELEAGUE Major 2017.

Outside of competitive play, n0thing created a dance move based around the flashbang grenade animations in the game. In 2014, he was a notable victim of a Swatting hoax while he was live streaming, an incident that was covered in an episode of French television show L'Effet Papillon on Canal+. n0thing also makes videos instructing viewers on how to improve at playing Counter-Strike. As of 2016, n0thing was one of the three player representatives in the Professional Esports Association.

== Honours ==
- ESL One Cologne 2017 - 2nd;
- Esports Championship Series Season 3
- ESL Pro League Season 4 — 1st;
- ELEAGUE Season 1 - 5th-8th;
- Esports Championship Series Season 1 - 5th-6th;
- iBUYPOWER Cup 2015 — 1st;
- ESL Pro League Season 1 — 2nd;
- ESL ESEA NA Pro League Season 1 —1st;
- ESL One Cologne 2014 - 5th-8th.
