= CaptainMo =

Chinese professional CS:GO player

captainMo
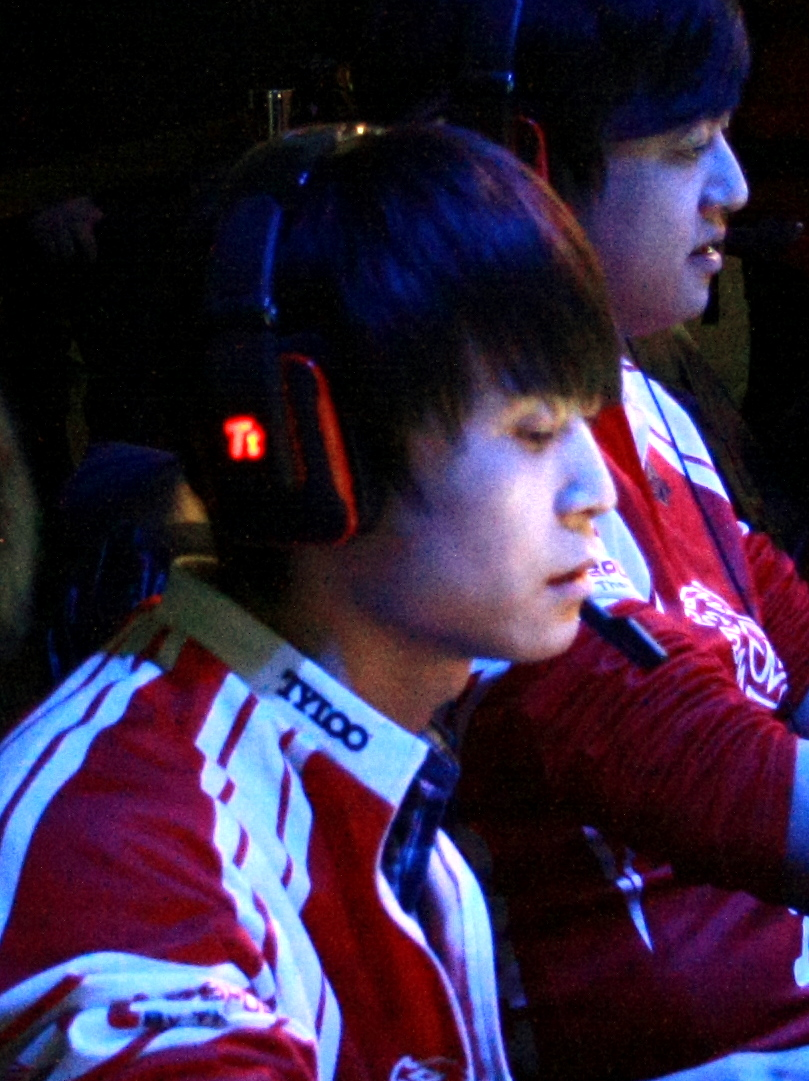
- Liu in 2012

Personal information
- Name: Liu Ke
- Born: 1989 or 1990 (age 36–37)

Current team
- Team: Steel Helmet
- Role: AWPer, Rifler
- Game: Counter-Strike 2

Career information
- Playing career: 2011–present

Team history
- 2011–2019: Tyloo
- 2019–2020: OneThree
- 2020–2021: Triumphant Song Gaming
- 2021–present: Steel Helmet

Liu Ke (Chinese: 刘珂), better known as captainMo, is a Chinese professional Counter-Strike 2 player and former Counter-Strike: Global Offensive (CS:GO), Counter-Strike: Source (CS:S) and Counter-Strike (CS) player. CaptainMo played for TYLOO for most of his career and is currently playing for Steel Helmet.

== Professional career ==
After team wNv, the first Chinese CS team won the world title, was disbanded in 2010, team Tyloo became the only big club which remained its CS roster in China. In 2011, captainMo joined Tyloo after the release of game Counter-Strike: Global Offensive (CS:GO). Later, captainMo became the in-game leader of Tyloo because of his good skills and game sense. He was well known in CS:GO community after Tyloo beat Team LG and Team Liquid in DreamHack Masters Malmö 2016. In 2018, Tyloo beat Team Spirit 2:0 in the final and became the first Asian team that advanced to CS:GO Major.

== Notable Results ==
Placement	Tournament	Location	Date
With Team Tyloo
2nd place, silver medalist(s)	Intel Extreme Masters XIII - Shanghai	Shanghai, China	August 1, 2018 – August 6, 2018
1st place, gold medalist(s)	StarLadder & ImbaTV Invitational Chongqing 2018	Chongqing, China	March 22, 2018 – March 25, 2018
2nd place, silver medalist(s)	ROG Masters 2017	Kuala Lumpur, Malaysia	December 7, 2017 – December 10, 2017
1st place, gold medalist(s)	China Cup 1	Shijiazhuang, China	March 17, 2017 – March 19, 2017
1st place, gold medalist(s)	Asia Minor Championship - Atlanta 2017	Johor Bahru, Malaysia	October 26, 2016 – October 30, 2016
1st place, gold medalist(s)	NEA Beijing Esports Open 2016	Beijing, China	July 1, 2016 – July 3, 2016
1st place, gold medalist(s)	Asia Minor Championship - Cologne 2016	Seoul, South Korea	May 5, 2016 – May 8, 2016
1st place, gold medalist(s)	Counter Strike Online World Championship 2013	Shanghai, China	December 7, 2013 – December 8, 2013
1st place, gold medalist(s)	K1 League 2013 Season 3	Shanghai, China	May 28, 2013 – June 30, 2013
1st place, gold medalist(s)	World Cyber Games 2012	Kunshan, China	November 29, 2012 – December 2, 2012
With Team TSG
1st place, gold medalist(s)	5e Open Cup Invitational 2020	Hangzhou, China	November 27, 2020 – November 29, 2020

== Live Stream ==
On March 13, 2019, captainMo started his live streaming with former professional Counter-Strike (CS) player Maxixi in Huya TV. They formed a group called CSBOY that has more than 2.2 million followers on stream.

== Personal life ==
On May 28, 2020, captainMo married Liu Daxi.
