= EHOME =

Chinese Dota 2 team

EHOME.cn
- Sport: Honor of Kings; Dota 2 Overwatch; Counter-Strike: Global Offensive; Warcraft 3
- Founded: 2004
- Folded: 2023
- Location: China
- Colors: Black, Gray, White

EHOME is a Chinese Dota 2 team. The team was founded in 2004 and consisted of Warcraft III and Counter-Strike teams. The Dota division was started in 2007. EHOME is one of the most successful Dota teams of all time. EHOME disbanded after The International 2012 but rebuilt in 2015. Now, EHOME is one of the highest ranked Dota 2 teams in China.

== History ==
The EHOME e-sports club was founded in March 2004.

A DotA division was established in 2007, following the signing of a team that had previously competed under the tag "HTML." The organization first gained international recognition in 2008 by winning WCG Asia 2008 in Singapore.

Shortly thereafter, two players—"2009" and "LongDD"—left the team. Through a series of transfers, two new members, "820" and "357," joined EHOME from another DotA team, CaNt.

Soon, "KingJ" and "BurNIng" joined the team, which necessitated a change in roles for some of the players. These adjustments proved beneficial, as the team went on to win the ESWC tournament and subsequently secured second place at the ESTC. In addition, the team participated in numerous other DotA tournaments.

Following these stunning results, "KingJ" and "BurNIng" left the team. They were replaced by "LongDD" and "Lanm", after which the team failed to secure top placements in many tournaments, with the exception of DMT.

== Tournament results ==
- 2nd — The International 2011
- 9–12th — Dota 2 Asia Championships
- 5–6th — The International 2015
- 4th — Frankfurt Major 2015
- 9–12th — Shanghai Major 2016
- 5–6th — The International 2016
- 1st — The Bucharest Minor
