= Freakazoid (gamer) =

American professional esports player

FREAKAZOiD
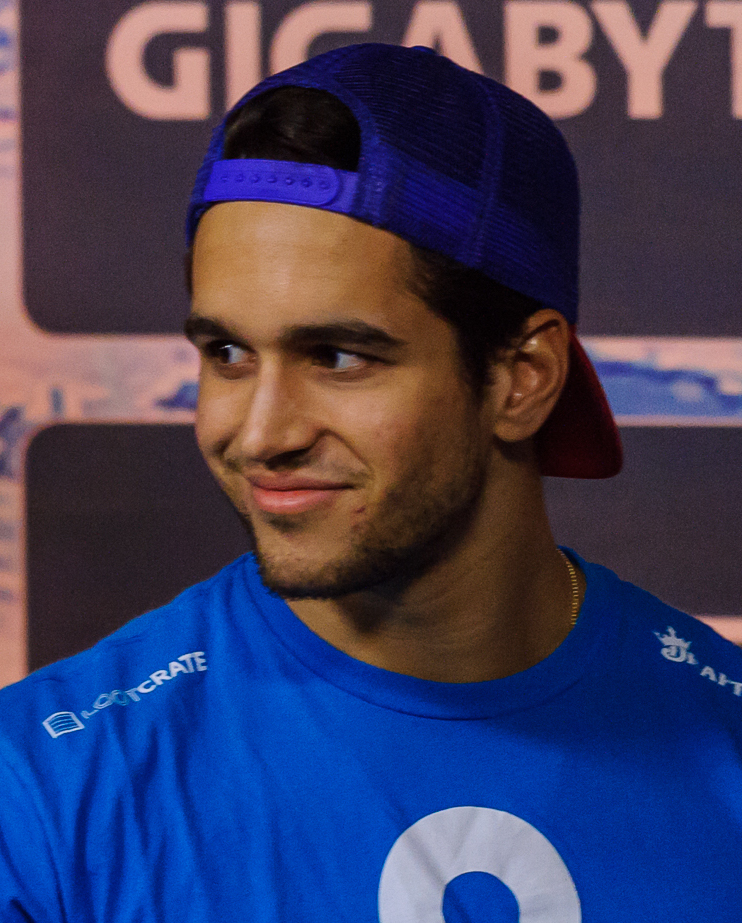
- Abadir at IEM San Jose 2015

Personal information
- Name: Ryan Abadir
- Born: November 25, 1992 (age 33)
- Nationality: American

Current team
- Team: no team
- Role: Rifler
- Game: Counter-Strike 2

Career information
- Games: Counter-Strike; Counter-Strike: Global Offensive; Counter-Strike 2
- Playing career: 2010–2020; 2022–present

Team history
- 2012: Team Dynamic
- 2012–2013: Frost Gaming
- 2013–2014: Homeless
- 2015–2016: Cloud9
- 2016–2018: Echo Fox
- 2018–2019: Swole Patrol
- 2019: Ghost Gaming
- 2019–2020: eUnited
- 2020: Swole Patrol
- 2022–2024: Mythic

Ryan Abadir (born November 25, 1992), better known as FREAKAZOiD, is an American professional Counter-Strike 2 player. He has played with teams such as Cloud9 and Echo Fox. Abadir was the last player under contract with Echo Fox, which ended in January 2018. In May 2020, Abadir announced his retirement from CS:GO to pursue a career in Valorant. He returned to professional Counter-Strike in January 2022 with the Mythic roster. In November 2024 he announced departure from Mythic.

== Professional career ==
=== Early career (2010–2014) ===
Abadir began competing professionally in Counter-Strike: Source before transitioning to Counter-Strike: Global Offensive (CS:GO) in 2012.

During the early years of CS:GO, he played for North American teams including Team Dynamic, Frost Gaming, and Homeless, primarily competing in ESEA and CEVO leagues.

=== Cloud9 (2015–2016) ===
Abadir joined Cloud9 on April 29, 2015, along with Tyler "Skadoodle" Latham. On July 9–12 C9 played at ESWC 2015 and finished 2nd behind Natus Vincere.

In February 2016 he was deducted a month's pay and attended an anti-bullying seminar after he was caught incorrectly treating Team Liquid player Oleksandr "s1mple" Kostylev during a FACEIT Pro League online match.

Abadir was dropped from the C9 roster on April 13, 2016. On April 26 he was announced as a stand in for Splyce in place of Abraham "abE" Fazli and got 7-8t at DreamHack Austin 2016.

=== Echo Fox (2016–2017) ===
On May 31, 2016, Abadir joined Echo Fox, reuniting with former C9 teammate Sean "sgares" Gares.Abadir remained with Echo Fox into 2017. He departed the organisation in early 2018.

=== Swole Patrol, Ghost Gaming, and eUnited (2018–2020) ===
In January 2018, Abadir joined Swole Patrol a North American CS:GO team.

In January 2019, after year in Swole Patrol, he signed with Ghost Gaming.

In September 2019, Abadir joined eUnited. He competed with the team at ESL One New York 2019 and in ESL Pro League matches. After eUnited released its CS:GO roster in March 2020, the team core competed under the Swole Patrol name.

=== Retirement and Valorant transition (2020) ===
On May 10, 2020, Abadir announced his retirement from professional CS:GO in order to pursue a competitive career in Valorant.

=== Mythic (2022–2024) ===
In January 2022, Abadir returned to professional Counter-Strike by signing with Mythic.

On November 27, 2024, he stepped down from Mythic's active roster.

== Team history ==
| Years | Team |
|---|---|
| 2010–2012 | Various North American teams |
| 2012 | Team Dynamic |
| 2012–2014 | Frost Gaming / Homeless |
| 2015–2016 | Cloud9 |
| 2016–2017 | Echo Fox |
| 2018–2019 | Swole Patrol |
| 2019 | Ghost Gaming |
| 2019–2020 | eUnited |
| 2020 | Swole Patrol |
| 2022–2024 | Mythic |
