= ESL Pro League =

Professional Counter-Strike 2 league

- Current season, competition or edition: ESL Pro League Season 23
- Formerly: ESL ESEA Pro League
- Game: Counter-Strike 2
- Founded: 2015
- First season: May 4, 2015
- Owner: ESL
- No. of teams: 24
- Region: International
- Most recent champion: Natus Vincere (Season 23)
- Most titles: Fnatic, MOUZ, Astralis, Team Vitality and Natus Vincere (3 titles each)
- Broadcaster: Twitch
- Sponsor: Intel
- Website: pro.eslgaming.com/csgo/proleague/

The ESL Pro League (formerly ESL ESEA Pro League; shortened as EPL) is a Counter-Strike 2 (CS2) professional esports league, produced by ESL. It was previously based on four regions: Europe, the Americas, Asia, and Oceania but following a format revamp in season 13, regional leagues were discontinued and unified into one league. ESL Pro League currently comprises 24 teams each season. The ESL Pro League is considered to be the premier professional CS2 league in the world and is one of the major professional leagues in esports. The ESL Pro League began as a venture between the Electronic Sports League (ESL) and E-Sports Entertainment Association League (ESEA). Its inaugural season started on May 4, 2015.

== History ==
In early November 2014, the German-based Electronic Sports League announced the creation of the ESL Pro League as the European ESL league. On April 28, 2015, ESL announced a joint venture with the North American-based E-Sports Entertainment Association League to provide a Counter-Strike: Global Offensive league with US$500,000 in total prize money in the first season between two continents. It later expanded to fourteen teams per region and raised its prize pool to US$1,000,000, with two seasons running each year. The prize pool increased once more in 2018, with ESL making the teams fight for $1,000,000 in the Finals, raising the season prize pool by $250,000. In addition, the number of teams in the finals rose to sixteen, with more teams from regions other than North American and Europe participating in the Finals.

On February 18, 2020, ESL would announce the Louvre Agreement, a revenue sharing partnership between ESL and the teams. Teams that signed on also qualified automatically for ESL Pro League as Permanent Partner Teams. The Louvre Agreement would expire at the end of 2024, as Valve, the game's developer, ended any form of partnership agreements within professional Counter-Strike in 2025.

In 2020, due to the onset of the COVID-19 pandemic, seasons 11 and 12 did not have a global final, instead regional finals were held in Europe and North America. In 2021, starting from ESL Pro League Season 13, the organization announced a changed format, with one league replacing the four regional leagues that existed prior to the pandemic. All 24 teams would travel to Europe to participate in the league, with the top 12 teams of the 24-team regular season proceeding to the playoffs. With the consolidation of the tournament into one event, the prize pool was reduced to $750,000. During ESL Pro League seasons 17 and 18, the prize pool was increased to $850,000 as a result of increasing the number of teams from 24 to 32. This was reduced back to $750,000 for seasons 19 and 20, before increasing to $1,000,000 for Seasons 21 and 22, which contracted the league back to 24 teams.

== Format ==
Prior to ESL Pro League Season 11, the league was split into 3 different regional leagues, Europe, Americas, and Asia-Pacific, with the top teams in each league qualifying for the season finals. However, due to the onset of the COVID-19 pandemic, season 11 only included two leagues: Europe and North America whereas season 12 was changed to have 5 regional leagues(Europe, North America, South America, Oceania, and Asia). Starting from ESL Pro League season 13, regional leagues were discontinued with teams from each region playing together in a unified league. Teams qualified to ESL Pro League based on their permanent partner team status, ESL World Ranking, or through qualifying from regional Pro League Conference tournaments, ESL Challenger League tournaments, and ESL Challenger Tournaments.

Starting from ESL Pro League Season 14, ESL announced a change to the playoffs format, removing the play-ins stage of the playoffs.

Before ESL Pro League season 17, the format was as follows:

- Group Stage:
  - Four single round-robin format groups
    - Each group has six teams
    - All teams play each other once
    - All matches are Best of 3s
  - Group 1st place teams advance to the Quarterfinals
  - Group 2nd & 3rd place teams advance to the Round of 12
- Playoffs:
  - Single-Elimination bracket
  - All matches (excl. Grand Final) are Best of 3s
  - The Grand Final is Best of 5

Following a format revamp by ESL, which saw the removal of the round-robin format and an increase to 32 teams rather than 24 teams of the previous iterations. This ESL Pro League format, used up until 2024, was as follows:

- Group Stage:
  - Four triple-elimination format groups
    - Each group has eight teams
    - All matches are Best of 3s
  - The top four teams from each group advance to the Playoffs:
    - Group stage winners advance to the Quarterfinals
    - Group stage runners-up advance to the Round of 12 as the High Seeds
    - Group stage 3rd place teams advance to the Round of 16 as the High Seeds
    - Group stage 4th place teams advance to the Round of 16 as the Low Seeds
- Playoffs:
  - Single-Elimination bracket
  - All matches (excl. Grand Final) are Best of 3s
  - The Grand Final is Best of 5

Following Valve's decision to permanently remove partnerships from the Counter-Strike esports ecosystem in 2025, the format changed once more, with the number of teams reduced back to 24 teams. The current format follows the same one used at the Majors since 2018, with two Swiss stages of 16 teams followed by an 8 team knockout stage, albeit with all Swiss matches at Pro League being best of 3s and the final being a best of 5. Teams qualify via their ranking in the global Valve Regional Standings, the ESL Challenger League or via auxiliary competitions.

== Seasons ==
The list of seasons and the top two teams in each season are in shown below. The number next to the teams showed what positions they placed during the regular season in their respective leagues. Regional leagues were discontinued in Season 13. Starting from Season 23, only the playoffs would occur in person, with the first two stages held online.

No.	Location	Winner	Score	Runner-up	Prize money	Ref
1	Cologne	Fnatic (EU 1)	3–1	Cloud9 (NA 1)	US$250,000	
2	Burbank	Fnatic (EU 2)	3–2	Natus Vincere (EU 3)	US$250,000	
3	London	Luminosity Gaming (NA 1)	3–2	G2 Esports (EU 4)	US$512,000	
4	São Paulo	Cloud9 (NA 1)	2–1	SK Gaming (NA 3)	US$600,000	
5	Dallas	G2 Esports (EU 2)	3–1	North (EU 1)	US$750,000	
6	Odense	SK Gaming (NA 2)	3–1	FaZe Clan (EU 3)	US$750,000	
7	Dallas	Astralis (EU 6)	3–1	Team Liquid (NA 1)	US$750,000	
8	Odense	Astralis (EU 1)	3–1	Team Liquid (NA 3)	US$750,000	
9	Montpellier	Team Liquid (NA 2)	3–1	G2 Esports (EU 3)	US$600,000	
10	Odense	mousesports (EU 1)	3–0	Fnatic (EU 8)	US$600,000	
11 EU	Online	Fnatic (EU 1)	3–2	mousesports (EU 3)	US$531,000	(Note: Seasons 11 and 12 were originally intended to be an offline event, with the finals taking place at Denver, Colorado, United States. However, due to the global COVID-19 pandemic, ESL announced that both the regular season and the finals will be split into regions: Europe and North America for Season 11 and Europe, North America, South America, Oceania, and Asia for Season 12, and that the regular season and the finals will be played entirely online. This was decided based on health and safety reasons and to minimize movement across regions.)
11 NA	Online	Team Liquid (NA 1)	3–0	Evil Geniuses (NA 2)	US$219,000	
12 EU	Online	Astralis (EU 1)	3–2	Natus Vincere (EU 2)	US$450,000	
12 NA	Online	Furia Esports (NA 1)	3–0	100 Thieves (NA 2)	US$225,000	
13	Online	Heroic	3–2	Gambit Esports	US$750,000	
14	Online	Natus Vincere	3–2	Team Vitality	US$750,000	
15	Düsseldorf	FaZe Clan	3–1	ENCE	US$850,000	
16	Naxxar	Team Vitality	3–2	Team Liquid	US$835,000	
17	Saint Julian's	FaZe Clan	3–1	Cloud9	US$850,000	
18	Saint Julian's	MOUZ	3–0	Natus Vincere	US$850,000	
19	Saint Julian's	MOUZ	3–0	Team Vitality	US$750,000	
20	Saint Julian's	Natus Vincere	3–2	Eternal Fire	US$750,000	
21	Stockholm	Team Vitality	3–0	MOUZ	US$1,000,000	
22	Stockholm	Team Vitality	3–0	Team Falcons	US$1,000,000	
23	Stockholm	Natus Vincere	3-1	Aurora Gaming	US$1,000,000	
24	Katowice	Team Vitality	3-0	MOUZ	US$1,000,000	
25	TBD, Saudi Arabia				US$1,000,000	

== Other leagues ==
ESL also operated other leagues outside of Counter-Strike. The Rainbow Six Pro League ran for 10 seasons (with an 11th being cancelled due to the COVID-19 pandemic), before FACEIT and later BLAST operated the game's pro circuit. The PENTA Sports/G2 Esports core won the most titles with four, those being the Year 1 Season 1, Year 2 Season 1, Year 2 Season 2, and Season 8 titles. ESL also ran the Halo Championship Series in its inception and, via ESL's acquisition of Esports Engine in 2023, currently operate the league with Halo Studios the game's developer. However, the two leagues are much less prominent than the Counter-Strike league, as Rainbow Six only had a $248,000 prize pool in 2019 compared to CS:GO's $600,000 prize pool.

== See also ==
- Intel Extreme Masters
