= ShahZaM =

American professional esports player

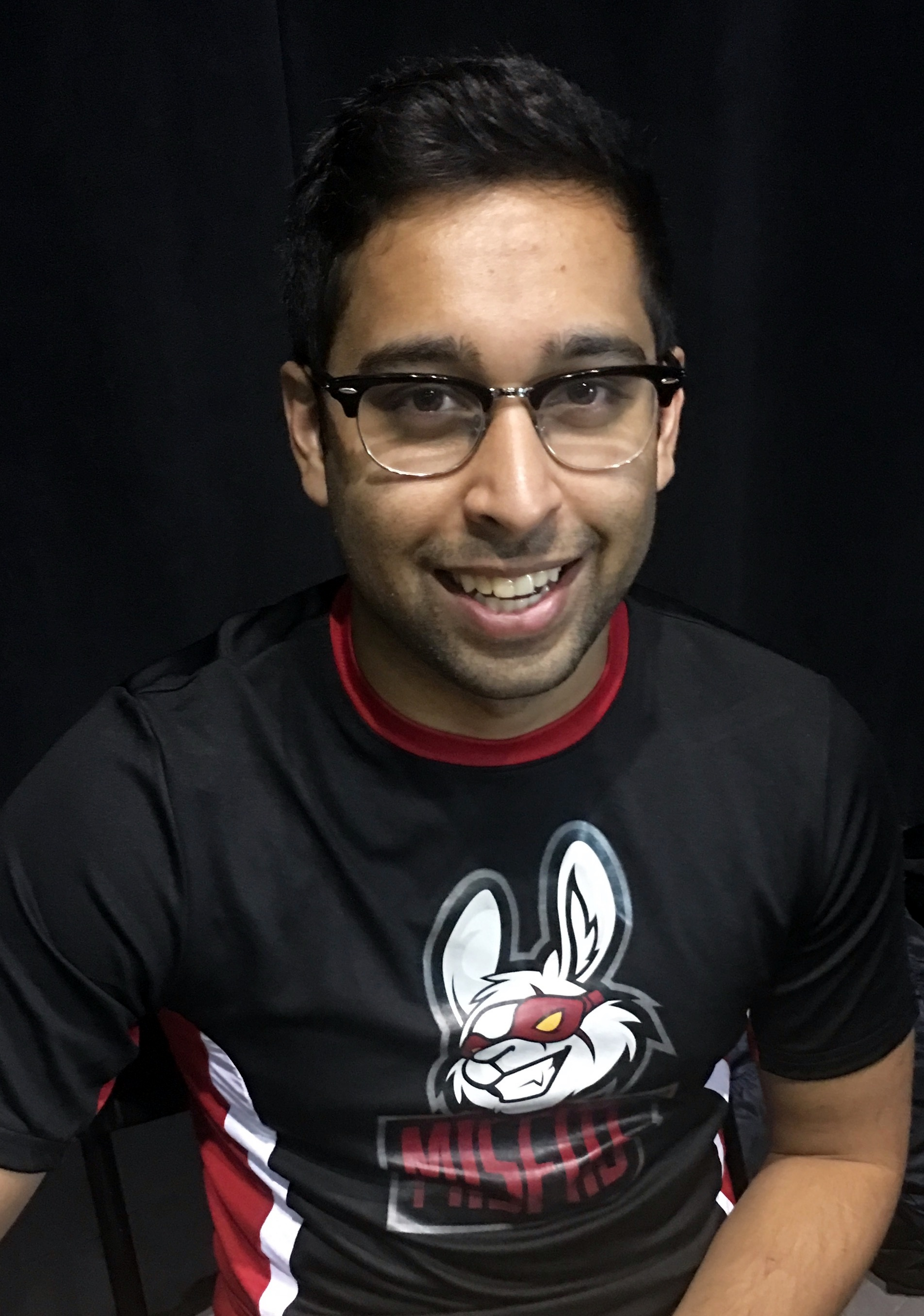
- Khan in 2017

Personal information
- Name: Shahzeb Asghar Khan
- Born: October 8, 1993 (age 33)
- Nationality: Pakistani-American

Career information
- Games: Counter-Strike; Valorant
- Role: In-game Leader

Team history
- Counter-Strike: Global Offensive
- 2014: Denial eSports
- 2014–2015: Cloud9
- 2015: Tempo Storm
- 2015: Sponsorless
- 2015: Conquest
- 2016: OpTic Gaming
- 2016: Echo Fox
- 2016–2017: Team SoloMid
- 2017–2018: Misfits Gaming
- 2018: OpTic Gaming
- 2018–2019: compLexity Gaming
- Valorant
- 2020–2022: Sentinels
- 2022–2023: G2 Esports

Shahzeb Asghar Khan (born October 8, 1993), better known as ShahZaM, is a content creator and streamer. He was a former CS:GO professional player before announcing that he would be officially making the switch to Riot Games' Valorant. He would find most of his success in Valorant as he went on to win their first international LAN tournament in Reykjavík, Iceland. As captain of Sentinels, he led the team to the title at VCT 2021 Stage 2 Masters Reykjavík.

== Early life and career history ==
Khan grew up in Maryland. On December 15, 2014, he joined Cloud9.

Khan was central in uncovering the iBuyPower and NetcodeGuides match fixing scandal, after he issued a statement confirming that the match at issue had been thrown.

On April 13, 2016, he was released from OpTic Gaming.

On May 19, 2016 Echo Fox replaced AWPer Mohamad "m0E" Assad (who was promoted to general manager), picking up ShahZaM as his replacement.

On December 15, 2016, ShahZaM and Sgares joined Team SoloMid.

On January 17, 2017, ShahZaM and the rest of the Team SoloMid roster were acquired by Misfits Gaming.

On February 7, 2018, ShahZaM joined OpTic Gaming.

On April 27, 2018, ShahZaM joined compLexity Gaming as an AWPer.

On October 28, 2019, ShahZaM was removed from the active roster of compLexity Gaming. The announcement was made in the wake of Complexity's poor performance during the months prior, including their early elimination from the StarSeries Berlin Major. ShahZaM later communicated on his Twitch stream that the team had struggled in large part due to the relative inexperience of many of the team's members, which included the then 16 year old Owen "oBo" Schlatter. ShahZaM expressed frustration with not being able to focus on his primary role of AWPing due to constantly having to perform in-game duties that on a more experienced roster would have been able to take on.

On November 26, 2019, ShahZaM announced his free-agency via Twitter, bringing an official end to his time with CompLexity Gaming. ShahZaM also mentioned his eagerness to find a new team as quickly as possible.

On April 28, 2020, ShahZaM signed with Sentinels, officially making the switch over to Valorant.

On October 6, 2022, ShahZaM was informed live on his Twitch stream that he would not be offered a renewed contract with Sentinels when his current contract expires at the end of the year.

== Awards and nominations ==
Year	Ceremony	Category	Result	Ref.
2022	The Streamer Awards	Best Valorant Streamer	Nominated	
