= ESL Pro League Season 3 =

Esports league season

ESL Pro League
- 2016

Tournament information
- Sport: Counter-Strike: Global Offensive
- Location: London, United Kingdom
- Dates: February 9, 2016–May 15, 2016.
- Administrator: Electronic Sports League (ESL)
- Teams: 24 teams
- Purse: US$510,000 for Finals; US$190,000 for Preliminaries

Final positions
- Champions: (Brazil) Luminosity Gaming
- 1st runners-up: (France) G2 Esports
- 2nd runners-up: (Sweden) Ninjas in Pyjamas (Sweden) Fnatic
- MVP: (Brazil) Marcelo "coldzera" David

ESL Pro League Season 3 (shortened as EPL Season 3) was an Electronic Sports League Counter-Strike: Global Offensive tournament. It was the third season of the ESL Pro League. The Finals took place in London, United Kingdom from May 11 to May 15, 2016. Europe's regular season began on February 9, with Astralis beating Natus Vincere and ended with Ninjas in Pyjamas defeating G2 Esports. North America's season started with Renegades defeating Enemy (which later signed with Selfless Gaming) and ended with Team Liquid defeating Splyce The finals concluded with Luminosity Gaming defeating G2 Esports in a close best of five grand finals, which many consider to be a classic. Teams from two continents, North America and Europe competed in twelve team leagues and play against each other twice to determine the top four teams from each continent that would play in the Finals. The finals will offer a prize pool of US$510,000.

== Format ==
Each continent featured the top nine teams from last season's ESL Pro League Season 2, two teams from the ESL Pro League Season 2 Relegation, and one team from the Wild Card. Teams within each continent will play each other twice to determine the top four qualifier to the Finals in London. There will be a total of nine weeks in this phase of the tournament. All games in the preliminaries will be played online.

The top four teams after the conclusion of the regular season moved on to London to play in the Finals; in addition, those teams were invited to next season's ESL Pro League. Teams that placed fifth to eleventh place did not make the Finals, but were invited to next season's ESL Pro League. The teams in 12th place were required to play in Season 3's Relegation match, in which two teams from each continent play to see which team moves on to next season's ESL Pro League

The Finals consisted of eight teams, four from Europe and four from North America. These teams were separated into two groups – the first and third seeds from North America and the second and fourth seeds from Europe will be in one group and the other teams in the other group. The group stage consisted of the highest seed going against the lowest seed and the middle two seeds against each other, both games in a best of one format. The winners will play in a best of one to determine one team in the Playoffs; the losers will play in a best of three to determine which team gets eliminated from the tournament. The remaining two teams will play in a best of three to determine which team will be the second team in the group to move on to the Playoffs. In the Playoffs, the semifinals will be a best of three and the finals will be a best of five. The winner of the finals will win the tournament and the top prize. All games in the Finals were played offline.

== Teams ==
North America

- (Brazil) Luminosity Gaming (Season 2 Top 9)
- (United States) Team Liquid (Season 2 Top 9)
- (Canada) OpTic Gaming (Season 2 Top 9)
- (United States) Cloud9 (Season 2 Top 9)
- (United States) compLexity Gaming (Season 2 Top 9)
- (United States) Splyce (Season 2 Top 9)
- (United States) Selfless Gaming (Season 2 Top 9)
- (United States) Counter Logic Gaming (Season 2 Top 9)
- (United States) KKona (Season 2 Top 9)
- (United States) Winterfox (Season 2 Relegation)
- (United States) NRG eSports (Season 2 Relegation)
- (Australia) Renegades (Wild Card)

Europe

- (Denmark) Astralis (Season 2 Top 9)
- (Sweden) Fnatic (Season 2 Top 9)
- (Ukraine) Natus Vincere (Season 2 Top 9)
- (France) Team EnVyUs (Season 2 Top 9)
- (France) G2 Esports (Season 2 Top 9)
- (Denmark) Team Dignitas (Season 2 Top 9)
- (Sweden) Ninjas in Pyjamas (Season 2 Top 9)
- (Germany) mousesports (Season 2 Top 9)
- (Poland) Virtus.pro (Season 2 Top 9)
- (Denmark) SK Gaming (Season 2 Relegation)
- (Ukraine) FlipSid3 Tactics (Season 2 Relegation)
- (European Union) FaZe Clan (Wild Card)

== North America ==
=== Broadcast Talent ===
Commentators

- (United States) Cory "megaman" Gilbert
- (United States) John "BLU" Mullen
- (United States) Jason "moses" O'Toole

=== Final standings ===
Final Standings
Place	Prize Money	Team	W-L	RF-RA	RD	Pts	Roster	Coach
1st	TBD	(Brazil) Luminosity Gaming	18-4	304-223	+81	54	(Brazil) FalleN, (Brazil) coldzera, (Brazil) TACO, (Brazil) fnx, (Brazil) fer	(Brazil) zews
2nd	TBD	(United States) Cloud9	16-6	306-229	+77	48	(United States) n0thing, (United States) Stewie2k, (United States) Skadoodle, (United States) fREAKAZOiD, (Canada) shroud	(United States) lrukandji
3rd	TBD	(Canada) OpTic Gaming	15-7	311-211	+100	45	(Canada) daps, (Canada) NAF, (Canada) stanislaw, (United States) RUSH, (Spain) mixwell	
4th	TBD	(United States) Team Liquid	14-8	321-245	+76	42	(United States) Hiko, (United States) nitr0, (United States) EliGE, (United States) koosta, (United States) adreN, (Ukraine) s1mple	
5th	US$27,000	(United States) NRG eSports	14-8	291-259	+32	42	(United States) ptr, (United States) just9n, (United States) Silent3m, (Germany) gob b, (Serbia) LEGIJA	
6th	US$23,500	(United States) Selfless Gaming	13-9	305-260	+45	39	(United States) MAiNLiNE, (United States) Relyks, (United States) Nifty, (United States) mitch, (United States) Lucky, (Canada) Uber	(United States) Ryu
7th	US$20,000	(Australia) Renegades	13-9	287-249	+38	39	(Australia) AZR, (Australia) jks, (Australia) Yam, (Australia) USTILO, (Australia) SPUNJ	(Australia) peekay
8th	US$16,500	(United States) Winterfox	11-11	246-271	-25	33	(United States) LeX, (United States) anger, (United States) flowsicK, (Canada) hades, (France) Xp3	(United States) paradox
9th	US$13,000	(United States) Splyce	8-14	226-297	-71	24	(United States) arya, (United States) abE, (United States) Professor_Chaos, (Canada) jasonR, (Canada) DAVEY	
10th	US$9,500	(United States) Counter Logic Gaming	5-17	220-333	-113	15	(United States) reltuC, (United States) jdm64, (United States) hazed, (United States) FugLy, (United States) tarik	(Bosnia and Herzegovina) pita
11th	US$6,000	(United States) compLexity Gaming	4-18	257-346	-89	12	(United States) witmer, (Canada) Uber, (Canada) androidx23 (United Kingdom) Surreal, (United Kingdom) dephh	(United States) Warden
12th	US$3,500	(Canada) KKona	1-21	199-350	-151	3	(United States) inVert, (United States) rooRoooo, (United States) vice, (United States) dayV1D, (Canada) OCEAN, (Canada) els	

==== Scores ====
North America Results

Results
	Liquid	LG	OpTic	CLG	coL	Cloud9	Splyce	Selfless	KKona	WFX	NRG	RNG
Liquid		13-16; 11-16	16-10; 16-12	16-5; 22-19	8-16; 16-14	16-8; 16-5	14-16; 16-4	9-16; 16-11	16-1; 16-1	16-8; 11-16	14-16; 16-12	11-16; 16-7
LG	16-13; 16-11		F-W; F-W^{1}	16-9; 16-12	16-2; 16-9	13-16; 16-7	16-11; 16-8	16-14; 16-6	16-13; 16-5	16-11; 3-16	16-3; 16-9	16-3; 16-13
OpTic	10-16; 12-16	W-F; W-F^{1}		16-7; 16-7	16-10; 16-4	16-13; 16-7	16-4; 16-6	10-16; 14-16	16-10; 16-11	16-5; 6-16	10-16; 16-8	16-7; 9-16
CLG	5-16; 19-22	9-16; 12-16	7-16; 7-16		19-17; 16-10	12-16; 5-16	8-16; 13-16	16-12; 6-16	16-6; 16-10	10-16; 13-16	F-W; F-W^{1}	5-16; 6-16
coL	16-8; 14-16	2-16; 9-16	10-16; 4-16	17-19; 10-16		15-19; 2-16	7-16; 16-14	16-12; 13-16	22-18; 8-16	12-16; 14-16	13-16; 13-16	11-16; 13-16
Cloud9	8-16; 5-16	16-13; 7-16	13-16; 7-16	16-12; 16-5	19-15; 16-2		16-7; 16-5	16-10; 4-16	16-9; 16-4	16-7; 16-3	16-12; 16-5	19-16; 16-8
Splyce	14-16; 4-16	11-16; 8-16	4-16; 6-16	16-8; 16-13	16-7; 14-16	7-16; 5-16		5-16; 11-16	16-12; 16-6	16-2; 3-16	16-11; 10-16	4-16; 6-16
Selfless	16-9; 11-16	14-16; 6-16	16-10; 16-14	12-16; 16-6	12-16; 16-13	10-16; 16-4	16-5; 16-11		16-11; 16-11	10-16; 16-5	16-7; 10-16	12-16; 10-16
KKona	1-16; 1-16	13-16; 5-16	10-16; 11-16	6-16; 10-16	18-22; 16-8	9-16; 4-16	12-16; 6-16	11-16; 11-16		7-16; 6-16	10-16; 14-16	6-16; 12-16
WFX	8-16; 16-11	11-16; 16-3	5-16; 16-6	16-10; 16-13	16-12; 16-14	7-16; 3-16	2-16; 16-3	16-10; 5-16	16-7; 16-6		10-16; 12-16	4-16; 3-16
NRG	16-14; 12-16	3-16; 9-16	16-10; 8-16	W-F; W-F^{1}	11-16; 16-10	12-16; 5-16	16-14; 12-16	16-7; 16-10	16-10; 16-14	16-10; 16-12		16-2; 16-13
RNG	16-11; 7-16	3-16; 13-16	7-16; 16-9	16-5; 16-6	16-11; 16-13	16-19; 8-16	16-4; 16-6	16-12; 10-16	16-6; 16-12	16-4; 16-3	2-16; 13-16	

^{1}Luminosity Gaming and Counter Logic Gaming forfeited their matches against OpTic Gaming and NRG eSports, respectively, since both teams were attending DreamHack Masters Malmö 2016 in Sweden.

== Europe ==
=== Broadcast Talent ===
Commentators

- (United States) Anders Blume
- (Finland) Joona "natu" Leppänen
- (Australia) Mitch "Uber" Leslie
- (United States) Auguste "Semmler" Massonnat
- (United States) Jason "moses" O'Toole
- (United Kingdom) Lauren "Pansy" Scott
- (Denmark) Niels Christian "NaToSaphiX" Sillassen
- (Canada) Matthew "Sadokist" Trivett

Analysts

- (Australia) Chad "SPUNJ" Burchill
- (Norway) Halvor "vENdetta" Gulestøl
- (Serbia) Janko "YNk" Paunović
- (United Kingdom) Leigh "Deman" Smith

Observer

- (United Kingdom) Alex "Rushly" Rush

=== Final standings ===
Final Standings
Place	Prize Money	Team	W-L	RF-RA	RD	Pts	Roster	Coach
1st	TBD	(Sweden) Ninjas in Pyjamas	19-3	346-209	+137	57	(Sweden) GeT RiGhT, (Sweden) f0rest, (Sweden) Xizt, (Sweden) friberg, (Sweden) pyth	(Sweden) THREAT
2nd	TBD	(Denmark) Astralis	16-6	316-233	+83	48	(Denmark) dev1ce, (Denmark) karrigan, (Denmark) Xyp9x, (Denmark) dupreeh, (Denmark) cajunb	(Denmark) zonic
3rd	TBD	(Sweden) Fnatic	15-7	308-251	+57	45	(Sweden) flusha, (Sweden) olofmeister, (Sweden) JW, (Sweden) dennis, (Sweden) KRiMZ	(Sweden) vuggo
4th	TBD	(France) G2 Esports	14-8	306-263	+43	42	(France) shox, (France) bodyy, (France) Rpk, (France) SmithZz, (Belgium) ScreaM	
5th	US$27,000	(Ukraine) Natus Vincere	14-8	304-291	+13	42	(Ukraine) Zeus, (Ukraine) Edward, (Russia) flamie, (Russia) seized, (Slovakia) GuardiaN	(Ukraine) starix
6th	US$23,500	(Denmark) Team Dignitas	11-11	264-293	-29	33	(Denmark) Kjaerbye, (Denmark) k0nfig, (Denmark) Magiskb0Y, (Denmark) MSL, (Norway) RUBINO	
7th	US$20,000	(European Union) FaZe Clan	10-12	308-280	+28	30	(Portugal) fox, (Norway) rain, (Norway) jkaem, (Denmark) aizy, (France) kioShiMa	(Sweden) RobbaN
8th	US$16,500	(Germany) mousesports	9-13	302-321	-19	27	(Germany) denis, (Germany) nex (Germany) Spiidi, (Netherlands) chrisJ, (Bosnia and Herzegovina) NiKo	
9th	US$13,000	(France) Team EnVyUs	7-15	275-318	-43	21	(France) kennyS, (France) Happy, (France) apEX, (France) DEVIL, (France) NBK-	(Switzerland) Maniac
10th	US$9,500	(Denmark) SK Gaming	7-15	263-347	-84	21	(Denmark) Friis, (Denmark) AcilioN, (Denmark) Magiskb0Y, (Denmark) Pimp, (Sweden) MODDII	
11th	US$6,000	(Ukraine) FlipSid3 Tactics	6-16	240-308	-68	18	(Ukraine) Blad3, (Ukraine) markeloff, (Ukraine) Shara, (Russia) WorldEdit, (Finland) waylander	
12th	US$3,500	(Poland) Virtus.pro	4-18	233-351	-118	12	(Poland) TaZ, (Poland) NEO, (Poland) pashaBiceps, (Poland) Snax, (Poland) byali	(Poland) kuben

==== Scores ====
Europe Results

Results
	Astralis	Fnatic	Na'Vi	EnVyUs	G2	Dig	NiP	mouz	VP	SK	F3	FaZe
Astralis		16-5; 19-22	16-13; 14-16	16-10; 7-16	16-10; 8-16	16-11; 16-5	8-16; 4-16	16-12; 16-4	16-3; 16-11	16-7; 16-5	16-7; 16-7	16-12; 16-9
Fnatic	5-16; 22-19		16-11; 13-16	16-4; 5-16	16-5; 16-7	16-6; 16-5	6-16; 16-10	16-4; 17-19	16-12; 16-9	16-11; 16-6	16-13; 16-14	6-16; 10-16
Na'Vi	13-16; 16-14	11-16; 16-13		16-11; 16-7	19-16; 3-16	16-14; 16-3	16-13; 10-16	16-10; 10-16	16-9; 16-12	7-16; 12-16	16-12; 8-16	19-16; 16-12
EnVyUs	10-16; 16-7	4-16; 16-5	11-16; 7-16		11-16; 12-16	14-16; 7-16	10-16; 3-16	19-22; 8-16	20-22; 16-13	22-19; 16-6	16-9; 16-7	14-16; 7-16
G2	10-16; 16-8	5-16; 7-16	16-19; 16-3	16-11; 16-12		16-6; 10-16	16-13; 10-16	16-13; 10-16	14-16; 16-6	16-5; 16-13	16-12; 16-7	16-13; 16-10
Dig	11-16; 5-16	6-16; 5-16	14-16; 3-16	16-14; 16-7	6-16; 16-10		8-16; 8-16	19-16; 16-10	16-5; 16-14	25-23; 16-2	16-3; 16-7	16-9; 7-16
NiP	16-8; 16-4	16-6; 10-16	13-16; 16-10	16-10; 16-3	13-16; 16-10	16-8; 16-8		19-15; 16-14	16-2; 16-11	16-8; 19-16	16-4; 16-8	16-7; 16-9
mouz	12-16; 4-16	4-16; 19-17	10-16; 16-10	22-19; 16-8	13-16; 16-10	16-19; 10-16	15-19; 14-16		16-5; 15-19	16-8; 11-16	12-16; 13-16	16-14; 16-13
VP	3-16; 11-16	12-16; 9-16	9-16; 12-16	22-20; 13-16	16-14; 6-16	5-16; 14-16	2-16; 11-16	5-16; 15-19		11-16; 12-16	16-14; 6-16	9-16; 10-16
SK	7-16; 5-16	11-16; 6-16	16-7; 16-12	19-22; 6-16	13-16; 6-16	23-25; 2-16	8-16; 16-19	8-16; 16-11	16-11; 16-12		10-16; 16-13	25-23; 3-16
F3	7-16; 7-16	13-16; 14-16	16-12; 8-16	9-16; 7-16	12-16; 7-16	16-3; 7-16	4-16; 8-16	16-12; 16-13	14-16; 16-6	16-10; 13-16		8-16; 2-16
FaZe	12-16; 9-16	16-6; 16-10	17-19; 12-16	16-14; 16-7	13-16; 10-16	9-16; 16-7	7-16; 9-16	14-16; 13-16	16-9; 16-10	23-25; 16-3	16-8; 16-2	

== Finals ==
The finalized teams are shown below. Each team's world ranking for May 11, 2016 is also shown.

North America

- (Brazil) Luminosity Gaming (1)
- (United States) Cloud9 (15)
- (Canada) OpTic Gaming (24)
- (United States) Team Liquid (9)

Europe

- (Sweden) Ninjas in Pyjamas (5)
- (Denmark) Astralis (4)
- (Sweden) Fnatic (3)
- (France) G2 Esports (19)

=== Broadcast Talent ===
Host

- (United Kingdom) Oliver James "OJ Borg" Borg D'Anastasi

Desk Host

- (United Kingdom) Alex "Machine" Richardson

Commentators

- (Denmark) Anders Blume
- (United Kingdom) Henry "HenryG" Greer
- (United States) Auguste "Semmler" Massonnat
- (United States) John "BLU" Mullen
- (United States) Jason "moses" O'Toole
- (United Kingdom) Lauren "Pansy" Scott
- (Canada) Matthew" Sadokist" Trivett

Analyst

- (Serbia) Janko "YNk" Paunović

Observers

- (United States) Heather "sapphiRe" Garrozo
- (United Kingdom) Alex "Rushly" Rush

=== Group stage ===
==== Group A ====
Pos	Team	W	L	RF	RA	RD	Pts
1	(France) G2 Esports	2	0	32	19	+13	6
2	(Brazil) Luminosity Gaming	2	1	85	82	+3	6
3	(Canada) OpTic Gaming	1	2	48	55	-7	3
4	(Denmark) Astralis	0	2	48	57	-9	0

Group A Matches
(Denmark) Astralis	0	1	(Canada) OpTic Gaming
(Brazil) Luminosity Gaming	0	1	(France) G2 Esports
(Canada) OpTic Gaming	0	1	(France) G2 Esports
(Brazil) Luminosity Gaming	2	1	(Denmark) Astralis
(Canada) OpTic Gaming	0	2	(Brazil) Luminosity Gaming

Group A Scores
Team	Score	Map	Score	Team
(Denmark) Astralis	7	Inferno	16	(Canada) OpTic Gaming
(Brazil) Luminosity Gaming	12	Train	16	(France) G2 Esports
(Canada) OpTic Gaming	7	Cobblestone	16	(France) G2 Esports
(Brazil) Luminosity Gaming	9	Dust II	16	(Denmark) Astralis
(Brazil) Luminosity Gaming	16	Overpass	12	(Denmark) Astralis
(Brazil) Luminosity Gaming	16	Train	13	(Denmark) Astralis
(Canada) OpTic Gaming	12	Inferno	16	(Brazil) Luminosity Gaming
(Canada) OpTic Gaming	13	Overpass	16	(Brazil) Luminosity Gaming
(Canada) OpTic Gaming	–	Cobblestone	–	(Brazil) Luminosity Gaming

==== Group B ====
Pos	Team	W	L	RF	RA	RD	Pts
1	(Sweden) Ninjas in Pyjamas	2	0	38	27	+11	6
2	(Sweden) Fnatic	2	1	57	45	+12	6
3	(United States) Team Liquid	1	2	72	80	-8	3
4	(United States) Cloud9	0	2	36	51	-15	0

Group B Matches
(United States) Cloud9	0	1	(Sweden) Fnatic
(Sweden) Ninjas in Pyjamas	1	0	(United States) Team Liquid
(Sweden) Ninjas in Pyjamas	1	0	(Sweden) Fnatic
(United States) Cloud9	0	2	(United States) Team Liquid
(Sweden) Fnatic	2	0	(United States) Team Liquid

Group B Scores
Team	Score	Map	Score	Team
(United States) Cloud9	10	Inferno	16	(Sweden) Fnatic
(Sweden) Ninjas in Pyjamas	22	Dust II	18	(United States) Team Liquid
(Sweden) Ninjas in Pyjamas	16	Train	9	(Sweden) Fnatic
(United States) Cloud9	16	Dust II	19	(United States) Team Liquid
(United States) Cloud9	10	Cobblestone	16	(United States) Team Liquid
(United States) Cloud9	–	Cache	–	(United States) Team Liquid
(Sweden) Fnatic	16	Mirage	13	(United States) Team Liquid
(Sweden) Fnatic	16	Cache	6	(United States) Team Liquid
(Sweden) Fnatic	–	Overpass	–	(United States) Team Liquid

=== Playoffs ===
==== Bracket ====
Semifinals
(France)	G2 Esports	2
(Sweden)	Fnatic	1
(Sweden)	Ninjas in Pyjamas	1
(Brazil)	Luminosity Gaming	2

Finals
(France)	G2 Esports	2
(Brazil)	Luminosity Gaming	3

==== Semifinals ====
Semifinals
Team	Score	Map	Score	Team
(France) G2 Esports	14	Inferno	16	(Sweden) Fnatic
(France) G2 Esports	16	Cache	8	(Sweden) Fnatic
(France) G2 Esports	16	Train	12	(Sweden) Fnatic
(Sweden) Ninjas in Pyjamas	4	Overpass	16	(Brazil) Luminosity Gaming
(Sweden) Ninjas in Pyjamas	16	Dust II	8	(Brazil) Luminosity Gaming
(Sweden) Ninjas in Pyjamas	10	Cobblestone	16	(Brazil) Luminosity Gaming

==== Finals ====
Finals
Team	Score	Map	Score	Team
(France) G2 Esports	16	Overpass	10	(Brazil) Luminosity Gaming
(France) G2 Esports	13	Train	16	(Brazil) Luminosity Gaming
(France) G2 Esports	16	Cobblestone	10	(Brazil) Luminosity Gaming
(France) G2 Esports	11	Dust II	16	(Brazil) Luminosity Gaming
(France) G2 Esports	16	Inferno	19	(Brazil) Luminosity Gaming

=== Finals Standings ===
Final Standings
Place	Prize Money	Team
1st	US$200,000	(Brazil) Luminosity Gaming
2nd	US$90,000	(France) G2 Esports
3rd – 4th	US$44,000	(Sweden) Ninjas in Pyjamas
3rd – 4th	US$44,000	(Sweden) Fnatic
5th – 6th	US$36,000	(Canada) OpTic Gaming
5th – 6th	US$36,000	(United States) Team Liquid
7th – 8th	US$31,000	(Denmark) Astralis
7th – 8th	US$31,000	(United States) Cloud9
