= ZywOo =

French Counter-Strike player

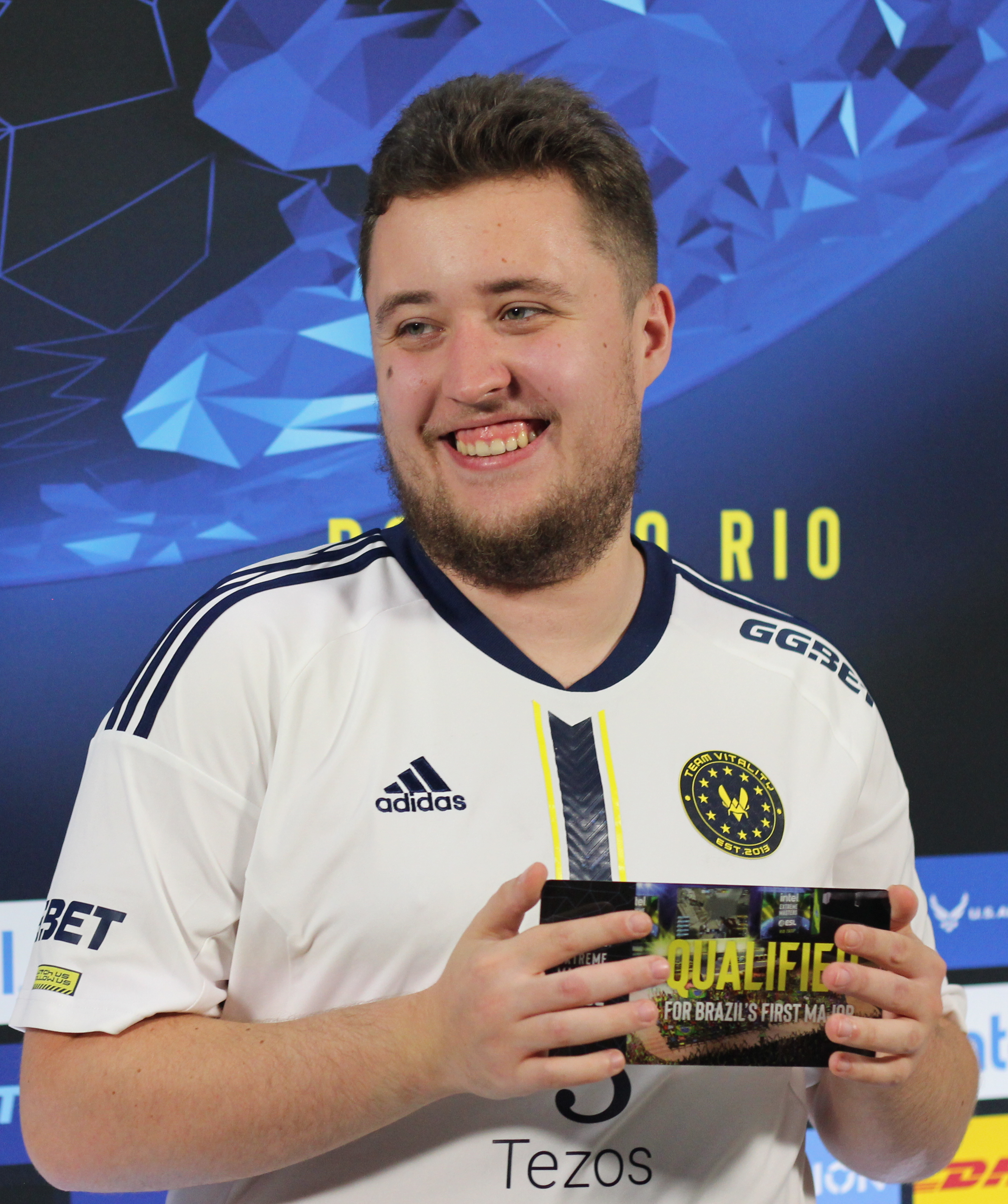
- ZywOo at the IEM Rio RMR in 2022

Personal information
- Name: Mathieu Herbaut
- Born: 9 November 2000 (age 26)
- Nationality: French

Current team
- Team: Team Vitality
- Role: AWPer, Rifler
- Game: Counter-Strike 2

Team history
- 2018–present: Team Vitality

Career highlights and awards
- 3× Major champion (Paris 2023, Austin 2025, Budapest 2025); 3× HLTV Major MVP (Paris 2023, Austin 2025, Budapest 2025); 2× ESL Grand Slam champion (Season 5, Season 6); 4× HLTV Player of the Year (2019, 2020, 2023, 2025); 7× HLTV Top 20 Player of the Year (2019–2025); 34× HLTV MVP; HLTV 2025 AWPer of the Year

Mathieu Herbaut (born 9 November 2000), known by the pseudonym ZywOo, is a French professional Counter-Strike player for Team Vitality. Considered one of the greatest players in Counter-Strike history for his dominance in both Counter-Strike: Global Offensive and Counter-Strike 2, he has been ranked the No. 1 player in the world by HLTV in 2019, 2020, 2023 and 2025, the No.2 player in 2021 and 2022, and No.3 in 2024. He is the second-youngest ever HLTV Player of the Year at 19 years old, and one of only three players, alongside coldzera and donk, to be named the HLTV Player of the Year in their first full year as a professional player.

== Early life ==
He started playing at age seven with his brother but was only allowed to play for less than an hour per day by his mother. After becoming a teenager, he still never "played in the middle of the night" or "did 4-5 hour sessions", his family always keeping an eye on what he was doing. His mother also encouraged him to get into video games, and from time to time even played with him. But before allowing him to participate in esports, she demanded that he first finish his secondary education and acquire his baccalauréat, which he did.

== Career ==
=== 2018 ===
After completing his baccalauréat, Mathieu was able to take up esports professionally, joining Team Vitality in October. The results came quickly, as they won DreamHack Open Atlanta 2018 in November. The next month, he and his team qualified for the minor qualifier for the next Major, Katowice Major 2019. In the Minors, Vitality landed in second place, securing a spot for the Major in Katowice.

=== 2019 ===
The results of ZywOo and his team were not that brilliant in the Majors: as they ended up finishing in 9-11th in Katowice Major 2019 and then a 5-8th place in StarLadder Berlin Major 2019. They still went on to win in two top-tier tournaments of the season, ECS Season 7 Finals and EPICENTER 2019, and finished second twice at ESL One Cologne 2019 and DreamHack Masters Malmö 2019.

Mathieu's individual stats were impressive for that year: he finished MVP 5 times and had a 1.30 overall rating in LAN events. In January 2020, Mathieu Herbaut was chosen as the World's Best Player of the Year 2019 by HLTV.org, thus becoming the first French and the youngest player to receive this award since its inception in 2010, and matching Marcelo 'coldzera' David's feat of receiving it in his first full year as a professional player.

=== 2020 ===
During 2020, many tournaments either transitioned to an online format or did not take place, due to COVID-19. Mathieu became the #1 player on HLTV.org's ranking for the second time in a row, with Natus Vincere's Oleksandr 's1mple' Kostyliev, and Nicolai 'device' Reedtz from Astralis behind him.

=== 2021 ===
After qualifying for the PGL Major Stockholm 2021, Team Vitality would lose against Natus Vincere during the quarter finals, and place 5th in the major. He was ranked the 2nd best player of 2021 by HLTV, with s1mple claiming the #1 spot.

=== 2022 ===
ZywOo was named MVP of the ESL Pro League Season 16, recording the most kills ever in a series with 143, breaking the previous record of 130 set by coldzera. Team Vitality dropped out of the PGL Major Antwerp 2022 on day 5, losing against Heroic. He was ranked the 2nd best player of 2022 by HLTV, with s1mple claiming the #1 spot.

=== 2023 ===
He received the MVP in Blast Paris Major 2023, the tournament that Team Vitality won against GamerLegion, beating them 2–0 in the final. ZywOo was awarded his sixteenth MVP award following Vitality's victory over ENCE in the grand finals of Gamers8 2023.

He was named the player of year by HLTV for a third time, tying s1mple's record.

=== 2024 ===
Team Vitality dropped out of PGL Major Copenhagen 2024 in the semi-final to FaZe Clan, who went on to lose the final to Natus Vincere

For the second major of 2024, Perfect World Shanghai Major 2024, Team Vitality went out in quarterfinals, once again to FaZe Clan.

ZywOo was ranked the 3rd best player of 2024, only behind m0NESY (#2), and donk (#1).

=== 2025 ===
Team Vitality won 7 out of 8 entered events in the first half of 2025, where ZywOo would win his 21st to 27th HLTV MVPs at IEM Katowice 2025, ESL Pro League Season 21, BLAST Open Lisbon 2025, IEM Melbourne 2025, Blast Rivals 2025 Season 1, IEM Dallas 2025, and the BLAST Austin Major 2025 respectively. With his 22nd win, ZywOo overtook the record for most HLTV MVPs previously held by s1mple, and by the 23rd MVP ZywOo overtook the record for LAN MVPs with 17 LAN MVPs, previously also held by s1mple. With the victory at IEM Melbourne 2025, Vitality have also completed the ESL Grand Slam Season 5.

At the Austin Major, ZywOo won his second Major after Paris 2023, where he would also receive his second Major MVP award, becoming the third player to receive multiple after Marcelo "coldzera" David and Nicolai "dev1ce" Reedtz.

After a 4-month drought of tournament wins, Vitality won ESL Pro League Season 22, making it the first tournament ever won by Vitality since his joining where ZywOo did not get the HLTV MVP, which instead went to m0NESY, from Team Falcons.

On August 25, 2025, ZywOo was awarded the Esports Breakthrough Player of the Decade at the 2025 Esports Decade Awards. On November 19, 2025, he also won the 2025 PC Player of the Year at the Esports Awards. In addition, he was nominated for the Best Esports Athlete at The Games Awards 2025, but did not win.

On December 14, 2025, ZywOo and Vitality were crowned champions of the StarLadder Budapest Major 2025, his third Major title. He was also awarded his third Major MVP, the most of any player. He became the first back-to-back Major MVP since coldzera in 2016. ZywOo matched s1mple's 2021 record for the most medals in a single calendar year, with eight total MVPs. All eight of his MVPs were at Big Events, surpassing dev1ce's record of seven Big Event MVPs set in 2018.

ZywOo was named the player of the year for a record-breaking fourth time by HLTV, breaking a tie with s1mple.

=== 2026 ===
Team Vitality won IEM Kraków 2026, with ZywOo winning his 29th HLTV MVP. ZywOo recorded a 1.59 rating, his highest ever at a Big Event. At PGL Cluj-Napoca 2026, which Vitality won, ZywOo achieved his 30th HLTV MVP. Team Vitality won IEM Rio 2026, with ZywOo earning his 31st HLTV MVP. Team Vitality won BLAST Rivals 2026 Season 1 Finals, with ZywOo winning his 32nd HLTV MVP. After this, Team Vitality would not see another tournament win until September, where the team won StarLadder StarSeries Fall 2026, where ZywOo would claim his 33rd HLTV MVP.

== Awards and recognition ==
- #1 player of 2019 by HLTV.
- #1 player of 2020 by HLTV.
- #2 player of 2021 by HLTV.
- #2 player of 2022 by HLTV.
- #1 player of 2023 by HLTV.
- #3 player of 2024 by HLTV.
- #1 player of 2025 by HLTV.
- 34 HLTV MVP medals.
- Esports Breakthrough Player of the Decade at the 2025 Esports Decade Awards.
- PC Player of the Year at the 2025 Esports Awards.
