= ELeague CS:GO Premier =

Esports league season

ELEAGUE
- 2017

Tournament information
- Sport: Counter-Strike: Global Offensive
- Location: Atlanta, Georgia, United States
- Dates: September 1, 2017–October 13, 2017
- Administrator: Turner Sports; William Morris Endeavor
- Tournament format(s): Group Stage (Bo1/Bo3); Single-Elimination Brackets (Bo3)
- Venue: Turner Studios
- Teams: 16 teams

Final positions
- Champions: FaZe Clan
- 1st runners-up: Astralis
- 2nd runners-up: Cloud9; North
- MVP: Håvard "rain" Nygaard

ELEAGUE CS:GO Premier was the fourth season of ELEAGUE that started on September 1, 2017, and ended on October 13, 2017. It was broadcast on the American cable television network TBS. The season featured 16 teams from across the world competing in a season, which included a regular season and a playoffs. The broadcast were simultaneously available on the online streaming service Twitch and YouTube Gaming, but when on television, a limited broadcast would appear on Twitch and YouTube.

The season kicked off with FaZe Clan defeating Renegades in Group A and the first televised match of the season featured FaZe Clan defeating Natus Vincere. The season concluded with FaZe Clan defeating Astralis in the finals 2–0 as FaZe dropped zero games throughout the whole tournament.

== Format ==
The format reflected that of ELEAGUE Season 2. A total of 16 teams will compete in the tournament. 12 teams will be invited and a four teams, two from the Americas qualifier and two from the Europe qualifier, will have to qualify for the tournament.

The 12 teams will be invited based on their past performances from the previous ELEAGUE seasons. Each closed qualifier will be played online and will be held from August 26, 2017, to August 27, 2017. One team, OpTic Gaming, would later have its invite taken away due to violation of ELEAGUE rules after roster changes.

The group stage featured four groups, making four teams per group. Teams will play in a double elimination group stage. The highest seed in the group will play against the lowest seed and the other two teams will play against each other in best of one games. The two winners and two losers will then play against each other. The winners match was a best of one and the loser's match was a best of three. The winner of the winners match will move on to the Playoffs and the loser of the winners match will play a third match against the winner of the losers match. The loser of the losers match is eliminated from the tournament. The last two teams in the group will play in a best of three; the winner of the match will get a spot in the Playoffs and the loser will head home. The top two teams in each group will advance to the Playoffs.

The Playoffs will consist of the eight teams. Teams will play in a single elimination, best of three bracket and will keep playing until a winner is decided. Each group winner will face off against a group runner-up in the quarterfinals. In addition, each team will not face another team from the same group until the finals if it ever reaches that point.

== Qualifiers ==
A maximum of 512 teams each competed in the European and Americas qualifiers. Both qualifiers took place online and were completed within two days. Shown below are the top 16 teams of each qualifier, with two from the European qualifier and three from the Americas qualifier moving on. Teams played in a single elimination bracket.

=== European Qualifier ===
Round of 16
Gambit Esports	14
AGO Gaming	16
Space Soldiers	10
Vega Squadron	16
Heroic	16
RedFear eSPORTS	2
FlipSid3 Tactics	16
Orion Gaming	8
HellRaisers	7
Red Reserve	16
Team EnVyUs	16
samba	3
Forcebuy	7
ARES	16
BIG	8
Tricked Esport	16

Quarterfinals
AGO Gaming	2
Vega Squadron	0
Heroic	2
FlipSid3 Tactics	0
Red Reserve	0
Team EnVyUs	2
ARES	2
Tricked Esport	0

Semifinals
AGO Gaming	0
Heroic	2
Team EnVyUs	2
ARES	0

Qualified
Heroic	Q
Team EnVyUs	Q

=== Americas Qualifier ===
Round of 16
Immortals	16
Denial eSports	9
Splyce	16
Bunch of chads	4
Counter Logic Gaming	12
Broken Alliance	16
Misfits	11
Rise Nation	16
NRG Esports	16
Final Feature Gaming	13
Renegades	16
Guerrilla Tactics	4
compLexity Gaming	7
Luminosity Gaming	16
Team Liquid	16
CLG Academy	4

Quarterfinals
Immortals	2
Splyce	0
Broken Alliance	2
Rise Nation	0
NRG Esports	0
Renegades	2
Luminosity Gaming	0
Team Liquid	2

Semifinals
Immortals	2
Broken Alliance	0
Renegades	1
Team Liquid	2

Qualified
Immortals	Q
Team Liquid	Q
Third Place Decider
Broken Alliance	0
Renegades	2

== Teams Competing ==
Eleven invited teams from will be joined by five other teams, two from each closed qualifier with an additional one from the Americas qualifier.

- Astralis (Invited)
- Cloud9 (Invited)
- FaZe Clan (Invited)
- Fnatic (Invited)
- G2 Esports (Invited)
- mousesports (Invited)
- Natus Vincere (Invited)
- Ninjas in Pyjamas (Invited)
- North (Invited)
- SK Gaming (Invited)
- Virtus.pro (Invited)
- Heroic (European Qualifier)
- Team EnVyUs (European Qualifier)
- Immortals (Americas Qualifier)
- Team Liquid (Americas Qualifier)
- Renegades (Americas Qualifier)^{1}

The twelve teams were invited based on their past results during the two Counter-Strike ELEAGUE seasons.

Past ELEAGUE Results
Team	EL S1	EL S2
Astralis	5th	2nd
Cloud9	5th	9th
FaZe Clan	9th	3rd
Fnatic	2nd	9th
G2 Esports	11th	9th
Heroic	DQ^{2}	N/A^{3}
Immortals	N/A^{3}	13th
mousesports	3rd	5th
Natus Vincere	3rd	9th
Ninjas in Pyjamas	5th	5th
North	15th	5th
Renegades	9th	N/A^{3}
SK Gaming	DQ^{2}	3rd
Team Liquid	17th	N/A^{3}
Cloud9	5th	9th
Virtus.pro	1st	5th

^{1} – ELEAGUE Season 2 champion OpTic Gaming had its invite taken back by ELEAGUE after the team replaced the majority of its players. Oscar "mixwell" Cañellas and Keith "NAF" Markovic stayed with the team. Tarik "tarik" Celik and Will "RUSH" Wierzba transferred to Cloud9 to replace Jordan "n0thing" Gilbert and Michael "shroud" Grzesiek on its active roster. OpTic signed former longtime Ninjas in Pyjamas member Adam "friberg" Friberg, former FaZe Clan AWPer Aleksi "allu" Jalli, and former North star Emil "Magisk" Reif. OpTic's spot will be filled in by a third team from the Americas qualifier.

^{2} – During ELEAGUE Season 1, Luminosity Gaming (now with SK Gaming) and SK Gaming (now with Heroic) were in a contract dispute. The Brazilians had agreed to sign with SK Gaming first when it was still under the organization Keyd Stars, but signed with Luminosity first during that time. In the middle of ELEAGUE Season 1 and some time prior to ESL One Cologne 2016, SK Gaming brought up the contract. After the two organizations came to an agreement, in which the Danes were released from SK Gaming and the Brazilians transferred to SK Gaming, ELEAGUE commissioner Min-Sik Ko stated that the transfer did "not comply with" ELEAGUE rules, thus resulting in the disqualification of the two teams.

^{3} – "N/A" indicates the team was not in the ELEAGUE season for any reason. Heroic was not invited to any open qualifier for ELEAGUE Season 2. Immortals was not invited to ELEAGUE Season 1 when it was signed with Tempo Storm. After Tempo Storm owner Andrey "Reynad" Yanyuk said that a person associated with ELEAGUE and he had an argument, thus ELEAGUE not wanting Tempo Storm in the tournament despite being ranked higher than many of the teams. reynad later sold the team to Immortals to give the team a better chance at more tournaments and Immortals later qualified for Season 2. Team Liquid was upset by Echo Fox in the ELEAGUE Season 2 Americas qualifiers. Renegades was defeated by OpTic Gaming in the Americas qualifier for Season 2.

== Broadcast Talent ==
Host

- Richard Lewis

Interviewer

- Sue "Smix" Lee

Commentators

- James Bardolph
- Anders Blume
- Daniel "ddk" Kapadia
- Auguste "Semmler" Massonnat
- Jason "moses" O'Toole

Producer

- Jason "Alchemist" Baker

== Group stage ==
=== Group A ===
Seed	Team	Record	RF-RA	RD	Points
1	FaZe Clan	2–0	32–15	+17	6
2	G2 Esports	2–1	74–53	+21	6
3	Natus Vincere	1–2	48–58	−10	3
4	Renegades	0–2	20–48	−28	0

Group A Results
FaZe Clan	1	0	Renegades
G2 Esports	0	1	Natus Vincere
FaZe Clan	1	0	Natus Vincere
G2 Esports	2	0	Renegades
Natus Vincere	0	2	G2 Esports

Group A Scores

Group A Scores
Team	Score	Map	Score	Team
FaZe Clan	16	Mirage	9	Renegades
G2 Esports	10	Inferno	16	Natus Vincere
FaZe Clan	16	Inferno^{†}	6	Natus Vincere
G2 Esports	16	Mirage	9	Renegades
G2 Esports	16	Nuke	2	Renegades
G2 Esports	–	Cobblestone	–	Renegades
Natus Vincere	12	Cobblestone	16	G2 Esports
Natus Vincere	14	Inferno	16	G2 Esports
Natus Vincere	–	Overpass	–	G2 Esports

=== Group B ===
Seed	Team	Record	RF-RA	RD	Points
1	North	2–0	38–34	+4	6
2	Fnatic	2–1	91–74	+17	6
3	Immortals	1–2	60–62	−2	3
4	mousesports	0–2	42–61	−19	0

Group B Results
mousesports	0	1	Immortals
North	1	0	Fnatic
North	1	0	Immortals
mousesports	1	2	Fnatic
Immortals	0	2	Fnatic

Group B Scores

Group B Scores
Team	Score	Map	Score	Team
mousesports	8	Cobblestone	16	Immortals
North	16	Mirage	14	Fnatic
North	22	Cobblestone^{†}	20	Immortals
mousesports	5	Train	16	Fnatic
mousesports	16	Mirage	13	Fnatic
mousesports	13	Cobblestone	16	Fnatic
Immortals	10	Train	16	Fnatic
Immortals	14	Inferno	16	Fnatic
Immortals	–	Cache	–	Fnatic

=== Group C ===
Seed	Team	Record	RF-RA	RD	Points
1	Cloud9	2–0	32–8	+24	6
2	Team EnVyUs	2–1	59–53	+6	6
3	Ninjas in Pyjamas	1–2	69–70	−1	3
4	Virtus.pro	0–2	19–48	−29	0

Group C Results
Virtus.pro	0	1	Team EnVyUs
Ninjas in Pyjamas	0	1	Cloud9
Cloud9	1	0	Team EnVyUs
Virtus.pro	0	2	Ninjas in Pyjamas
Team EnVyUs	2	1	Ninjas in Pyjamas

Group C Scores

Group C Scores
Team	Score	Map	Score	Team
Virtus.pro	6	Cobblestone	16	Team EnVyUs
Ninjas in Pyjamas	6	Mirage	16	Cloud9
Cloud9	16	Train^{†}	2	Team EnVyUs
Virtus.pro	8	Overpass	16	Ninjas in Pyjamas
Virtus.pro	5	Train	16	Ninjas in Pyjamas
Virtus.pro	–	Mirage	–	Ninjas in Pyjamas
Team EnVyUs	9	Cobblestone	16	Ninjas in Pyjamas
Team EnVyUs	16	Cache	9	Ninjas in Pyjamas
Team EnVyUs	16	Nuke	6	Ninjas in Pyjamas

=== Group D ===
Seed	Team	Record	RF-RA	RD	Points
1	Astralis	2–0	32–13	+19	6
2	Heroic	2–1	58–50	+8	6
3	SK Gaming	1–2	75–97	−22	3
4	Team Liquid	0–2	52–59	−7	0

Group D Results
Astralis	1	0	Team Liquid
SK Gaming	0	1	Heroic
Astralis	1	0	Heroic
SK Gaming	2	1	Team Liquid
Heroic	2	1	SK Gaming

Group D Scores

Group D Scores
Team	Score	Map	Score	Team
Astralis	16	Overpass	11	Team Liquid
SK Gaming	5	Train	16	Heroic
Astralis	16	Train^{†}	2	Heroic
SK Gaming	8	Inferno	16	Team Liquid
SK Gaming	16	Overpass	8	Team Liquid
SK Gaming	19	Mirage	17	Team Liquid
Heroic	8	Overpass	16	SK Gaming
Heroic	16	Inferno	5	SK Gaming
Heroic	16	Mirage	8	SK Gaming

^{†}Game was broadcast on TBS.

== Playoffs ==
Quarterfinals
Cloud9	2
G2 Esports	0
Astralis	2
Fnatic	0
FaZe Clan	2
Team EnVyUs	0
North	2
Heroic	0

Semifinals
Cloud9	1
Astralis	2
FaZe Clan	2
North	0

Finals
Astralis	0
FaZe Clan	2

Quarterfinals
Team	Score	Map	Score	Team
Cloud9	16	Cobblestone	12	G2 Esports
Cloud9	16	Inferno	8	G2 Esports
Cloud9	–	Cache	–	G2 Esports
Astralis	16	Train	5	Fnatic
Astralis	16	Overpass	12	Fnatic
Astralis	–	Mirage	–	Fnatic
FaZe Clan	16	Nuke	12	Team EnVyUs
FaZe Clan	16	Overpass	3	Team EnVyUs
FaZe Clan	–	Inferno	–	Team EnVyUs
North	16	Overpass	7	Heroic
North	16	Mirage	7	Heroic
North	–	Inferno	–	Heroic

Semifinals
Team	Score	Map	Score	Team
Cloud9	16	Mirage	12	Astralis
Cloud9	14	Overpass	16	Astralis
Cloud9	4	Inferno	16	Astralis
FaZe Clan	16	Mirage	12	North
FaZe Clan	16	Inferno	10	North
FaZe Clan	–	Train	–	North

Finals
Team	Score	Map	Score	Team
Astralis	14	Cache	16	FaZe Clan
Astralis	7	Overpass	16	FaZe Clan
Astralis	–	Inferno	–	FaZe Clan

== Final standings ==
The final standings, prize money distribution, and teams' rosters and coaches are shown below. Each team's in-game leader is shown first.

Final Standings
Place	Prize Money	Team	Roster	Coach
1st	US$500,000	FaZe Clan	karrigan, GuardiaN, NiKo, olofmeister, rain	RobbaN
2nd	US$150,000	Astralis	gla1ve, dev1ce, dupreeh, Kjaerbye, Xyp9x	zonic
3rd – 4th	US$70,000	Cloud9	tarik, autimatic, RUSH, Skadoodle, Stewie2K	valens
3rd – 4th	US$70,000	North	MSL, aizy, cajunb, k0nfig, valde	ruggah
5th – 8th	US$35,000	Fnatic	Golden, flusha, JW, KRiMZ, Lekr0	Jumpy
5th – 8th	US$35,000	G2 Esports	shox, apEX, bodyy, kennyS, NBK-	SmithZz
5th – 8th	US$35,000	Heroic	Snappi, es3tag, JUGi, niko, MODDII	FeTiSh
5th – 8th	US$35,000	Team EnVyUs	Happy, Rpk, SIXER, xms, ScreaM	maLek
9th – 12th	US$8,750	Immortals	steel, boltz, cogu^{1}, HEN1, LUCAS1	zakk
9th – 12th	US$8,750	Natus Vincere	Zeus, Edward, s1mple, flamie, seized	kane
9th – 12th	US$8,750	Ninjas in Pyjamas	Xizt, draken, f0rest, GeT RiGhT, REZ	THREAT
9th – 12th	US$8,750	SK Gaming	FalleN, coldzera, felps, fer, TACO	
13th – 16th	US$8,750	mousesports	chrisJ, oskar, ropz, STYKO, suNny	lmbt
13th – 16th	US$8,750	Renegades	Nifty, AZR, jks, USTILO, NAF	kassad
13th – 16th	US$8,750	Team Liquid	nitr0, ELiGE, jdm64, stanislaw, Twistzz	zews
13th – 16th	US$8,750	Virtus.pro	NEO, byali, pashaBiceps, Snax, TaZ	kuben

^{1} Immortals signed Vito "kNgV-" Giuseppe for the PGL Major 2017 after benching Lincoln "fnx" Lau. However, after placing second at DreamHack Montreal 2017, kNgV- went back to Brazil to clear visa issues. Counter-Strike 1.6 legend Raphael "cogu" Camargo took his place at ELEAGUE.
