= Geaves =

Geaves is a surname. Notable people with the surname include:

- Fiona Geaves (born 1967), English squash player
- Richard Geaves (1854–1935), Mexican footballer
- Ron Geaves (born 1948), English religious studies professor

== See also ==
- Gleaves
- Graves (surname)
