= Gla1ve =

Danish esports player

gla1ve
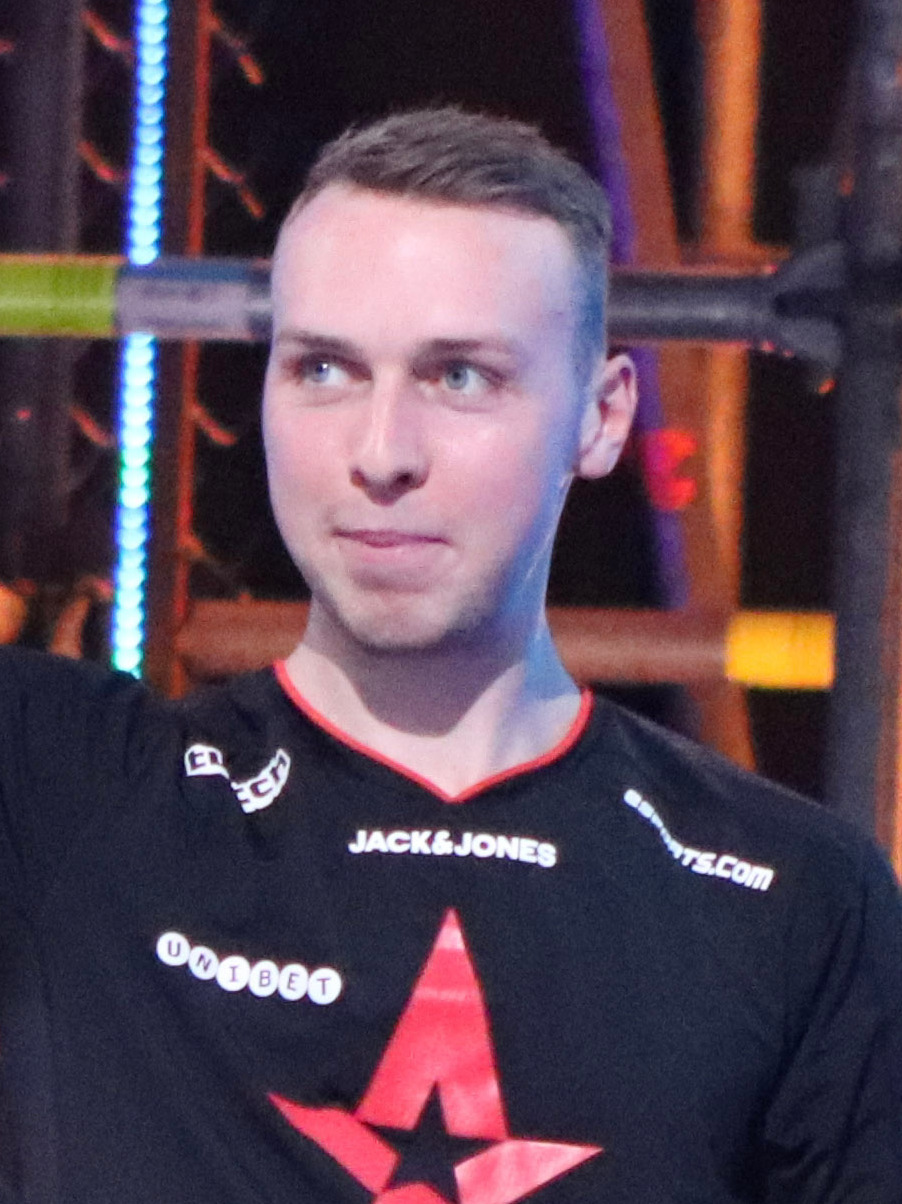
- gla1ve during IEM Katowice 2019

Personal information
- Name: Lukas Rossander
- Born: 7 June 1995 (age 31)
- Nationality: Danish

Current team
- Team: 100 Thieves
- Role: Head coach
- Game: Counter-Strike 2

Career information
- Games: Counter-Strike: Source; Counter-Strike: Global Offensive; Counter-Strike 2

Team history

As player:
- 2012; 2014; 2016: Copenhagen Wolves
- 2016: Heroic
- 2016–2023: Astralis
- 2023–2025: ENCE

As coach:
- 2025–present: 100 Thieves

Career highlights and awards
- 4× CS:GO Major champion (Atlanta 2017, London 2018, Katowice 2019, Berlin 2019); IEM Grand Slam champion (Season 1); HLTV Top 20 Player of the Year (2018); HLTV MVP

Lukas Egholm Rossander (born 7 June 1995), better known as gla1ve, is a Danish professional Counter-Strike 2 coach and former player who is the head coach of 100 Thieves. Considered one of the best captains in Counter-Strike: Global Offensive, he became the first (along with three of his teammates) to win 4 majors in CS:GO, and to win 3 majors consecutively.

== Career ==
=== Source career ===
Gla1ve's first Counter-Strike game he played at a professional level was Counter-Strike: Source, where he played with teams such as Reason Gaming and Epsilon Esports. Throughout his entire Source career, he found modest success and won $4924.99 in total.

=== 2012/2013 ===
Gla1ve's debut in professional CS:GO came in the form of a briefly lived TT Dragons roster, before he ended up in his first top team, Anexis Esports, along with Mathias "MSL" Lauridsen, Nichlas "Nille" Busk, Jacob "Pimp" Winneche, and Nicolaj "Nico" Jensen. Western Wolves found minor success, and placed 2nd at Copenhagen Games 2013, losing to the dominant team at the time Ninjas in Pyjamas, and also finished 3rd place at Mad Catz Invitational: Birmingham. However, despite these early successes, Western Wolves soon fell apart due to gla1ve and the team's star AWPer Nicolaj "Nico" Jensen's educational commitments.

=== 2014/2015 ===
Gla1ve would return to Copenhagen Wolves in mid 2014. At the GDK LAN finals, a dispute originated between the tournament organizer and gla1ve, after he said he would boycott the tournament unless his girlfriend was allowed on stage. According to the organiser's rules, only 5 players and 1 manager would be allowed on to the stage. Nicolaj "Nico" Jensen's girlfriend had already been registered as the manager, and the finals ended up being delayed for 45 minutes. Afterwards, gla1ve would be handed a ban from all GDK tournaments, along with an 1800 DKK fine. After this incident, gla1ve was removed from Copenhagen Wolves with the team citing unprofessionalism. This ended up being a major setback in his career, and he spent the 2015 at a semi-professional level on no top teams.

=== 2016 ===
In early 2016, gla1ve returned to Copenhagen Wolves in a revamped Danish lineup containing Marco "Snappi" Pfeiffer, Danny "smF" Dyg, Valdemar "valde" Bjørn Vangså, and Daniel "mertz" Mertz. gla1ve suffered from health issues at this time, and had multiple collapsed lungs. The roster was eventually signed by Heroic, containing gla1ve, Snappi, valde, along with Michael "Friis" Jørgensen and Andreas "MODDII" Fridh. gla1ve would stand-in for his future team Astralis at ESL One Cologne 2016 for Markus "Kjaerbye" Kjærbye who was a recent addition that had already played with another team at a major qualifier. In Heroic gla1ve found moderate success, including a 3rd-place finish at Northern Arena 2016 in Toronto, and a quarterfinals appearance at Starladder and i-League StarSeries Season 2. In Heroic, gla1ve and Snappi would share in game leadership duties between them, and gla1ve was considered a secondary caller. Gla1ve would soon transfer to Astralis, replacing the former in-game leader Finn "karrigan" Andersen. Astralis would immediately find success, earning a 2nd-place finish at ELEAGUE Season 2, and they won at the ECS Season 2 Finals.

=== 2017 ===
gla1ve started off the year by leading his team to the ELEAGUE Major 2017 trophy in Atlanta, taking home $500,000. They would follow this up with a win at IEM Katowice 2017, and a 2nd-place finish at Starladder & i-League Season 3. At the second major of the year, PGL Major Kraków 2017, Astralis were upset in the semifinals by the underdogs Gambit, who went on to win the event. Astralis managed two more 2nd-place finishes in 2017 at ELEAGUE CS:GO Premier 2017, and at BLAST Pro Series: Copenhagen 2017.

=== 2018 ===
Astralis would exit ELEAGUE Major: Boston 2018 in the group stage. This led to Markus "Kjærbye" Kjærbye leaving Astralis for the lower ranked Danish team North, a move which was considered by many of his former teammates to be a major surprise. Astralis replaced him with Emil "Magisk" Reif. After a semifinal exit at IEM Katowice 2018, Astralis won multiple LAN tournaments including the FACEIT Major: London 2018. Astralis won the first Intel Grand Slam, which handed out 1 million dollars to whoever won 4 ESL/Dreamhack organized tournaments within a 10 event window. gla1ve, along with their coach Danny "zonic" Sørensen are credited with creating the tactical system which led to Astralis' success. Astralis achieved one of the all-time best streaks on Nuke: 31 consecutive wins on LAN. For gla1ve, 2019 was a stand-out individual year for himself, leading to him achieving the #8 spot on the HLTV Top 20 Players of the year and getting his career first MVP at IEM Beijing 2019, which was a high rank for an In Game Leader.

=== 2019 ===
Gla1ve led Astralis to their third victory in IEM Katowice 2019 over Finnish team ENCE. Hence, the 4 Astralis players excluding Magisk are currently tied with the fnatic players of Robin "flusha" Rönnquist, Jesper "JW" Wecksell, and Markus "pronax" Wallsten in terms of major wins. Astralis were described by many people to be the greatest CS:GO team of all time following their second consecutive major victory. However, despite this success, their form soon dropped off, as they won their last event at BLAST Pro Series: São Paulo 2019.
