= Glaves =

Glaves is a surname. Notable people with the surname include:

- Gordon Glaves, the namesake of the Gordon Glaves Memorial Pathway, a portion of the Hamilton–Brantford–Cambridge Trails, Canada
- Helen Glaves, Senior Data Scientist at the British Geological Survey
- Noel David Glaves James (1912-1993), English author and historian of forestry
- Rory Glaves (born 1982), Canadian professional lacrosse player

== See also ==
- Glave (disambiguation)
