= M0NESY =

Russian professional esports player

m0NESY
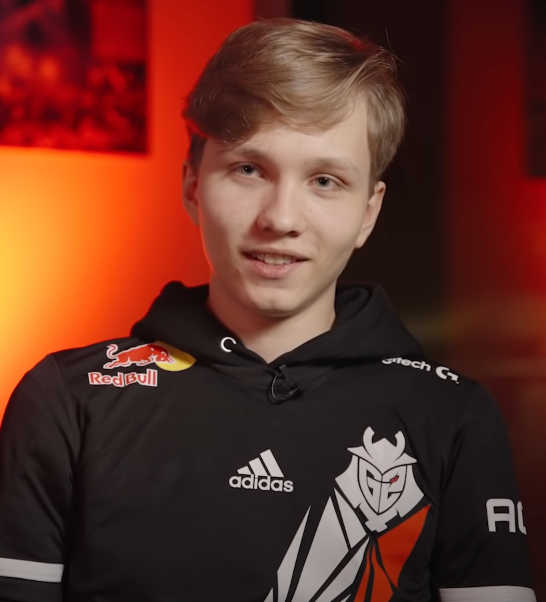

Personal information
- Name: Ilya Vyacheslavovich Osipov
- Nickname(s): The Flash, Baby Goat
- Born: May 1, 2005 (age 21); Orekhovo-Zuevo, Russia
- Nationality: Russian

Current team
- Team: Team Falcons
- Role: AWPer
- Game: Counter-Strike 2

Career information
- Playing career: 2020–present

Team history
- 2020–2022: NAVI Junior
- 2022–2025: G2 Esports
- 2025–present: Team Falcons

Career highlights and awards
- Counter-Strike Major champion (Cologne 2026); HLTV Major MVP (Cologne 2026); 7× HLTV "Big Event" Champion; 4× HLTV Top 20 Player of the Year (2022-2025); 7× HLTV MVP; HLTV 2022 Rookie of the Year; HLTV 2024 AWPer of the Year

Ilya Vyacheslavovich Osipov (Russian: Илья Вячеславович Осипов, born May 1, 2005), better known as m0NESY, is a Russian professional Counter-Strike 2 player for Team Falcons.

He is recognized for his skills and is considered one of the top young talents in the Counter-Strike scene. m0NESY was ranked as the 7th best player of 2022, the 4th best player of 2023, the 2nd best player of 2024 by HLTV, and the 4th best player of 2025. He also is the 2nd youngest player to be named an HLTV MVP at a "Big Event" (17 years, 7 months, 18 days), and the 3rd youngest player overall to receive an HLTV MVP award at the same age.

In 2022, m0NESY was awarded Rookie of the Year and Highlight of the Year by HLTV, as well as Esports PC Rookie of the Year by the Esports Awards. He was named the HLTV MVP of the BLAST Premier: World Final 2022.

== Early life ==
m0NESY started playing Counter-Strike 1.6 when he was just 5 years old on his brother's computer, and switched to Counter-Strike: Global Offensive three years later. At the age of ten, he reached the highest rank in the game — Global Elite, and by 12 years old, he had reached the maximum level on the Faceit platform. He was invited to FPL (Faceit Pro League) in March 2020 at just 14 years old.

== Career ==
=== NAVI Junior ===
In January 2020, he was accepted on a trial basis into NAVI Junior.

At the end of 2020, he and his team reached the semifinals of the European Development Championship Season 1.

From July 19 to August 8, 2021, the WePlay Academy League Season 1 tournament was held in Kyiv, where NAVI Junior took 5th place, not making it to the playoffs. In the second season of the tournament, NAVI Junior also participated and took third place, meeting MOUZ NXT in the finals. Later, NAVI Junior took second place in the WePlay Academy League Season 2 Finals, earning prize money.

=== G2 Esports ===
At the beginning of 2022, m0NESY joined the G2 roster, replacing François "AMANEK" Delaunay. In a 2026 interview, Ilya said that he had received offers from several teams while playing for NAVI Junior, but chose G2 and had never regretted the decision.

The first major tournament for the new roster was IEM Katowice 2022, where the team defeated Virtus.pro and the then-strongest Natus Vincere in the playoffs, but lost to FaZe Clan in the final.

m0NESY was nominated for Forbes' 2022 list of 30 Most Promising Russians Under 30 in the "Sports and Esports" category.

m0NESY and his team won the Blast Premier World Final 2022.

In 2023, m0NESY and his team won two Intel Extreme Masters series tournaments: Katowice and Cologne. By the end of the year, he ranked 4th in the HLTV world player rankings.

In June 2024, m0NESY contributed to G2 Esports' victory at IEM Dallas 2024, achieving his fourth HLTV "Big Event" championship. He also secured his second HLTV MVP.

In September 2024, m0NESY helped contribute to G2 Esports' victory at the Blast Premier Fall Final 2024, where he also achieved his third HLTV MVP of the tournament.

In November 2024, following a disappointing group stage exit from IEM Rio 2024, m0NESY and G2 Esports secured first place at the BLAST Premier World Final 2024. He earned his fourth HLTV MVP medal during the event.

On April 13th 2025, G2 Esports confirmed the sale of m0NESY to Team Falcons.

=== Falcons Esports ===
On April 14th 2025, Falcons Esports announced the signing of m0NESY.

m0NESY along with Falcons Esports reached the final in their debut event; IEM Melbourne, where they lost to Team Vitality in the final

Following his strong performances during the early months with Falcons, including a finals appearance at IEM Melbourne 2025, Osipov was named “Person of the Month” by Esports.ru

m0NESY earned his first HLTV MVP of 2025 in ESL Pro League Season 22 where they lost in the final to Team Vitality, and only around a month later, he would get another HLTV MVP in another losing tournament; BLAST Rivals 2025 Season 2, where this time, Team Falcons lost to FURIA

On the 21st of June, just 62 days after the team picked up Karrigan, m0NESY broke his own 8 final-loss streak by winning the IEM Cologne Major 2026 together with falcons. Falcons won 3-0 over Furia esports. m0NESY was picked by HLTV as the tournaments MVP, his first major mvp, and his 7th big event mvp, overtaking coldzera(6) for most big event mvps
