= Dev1ce =

Danish esports player

dev1ce
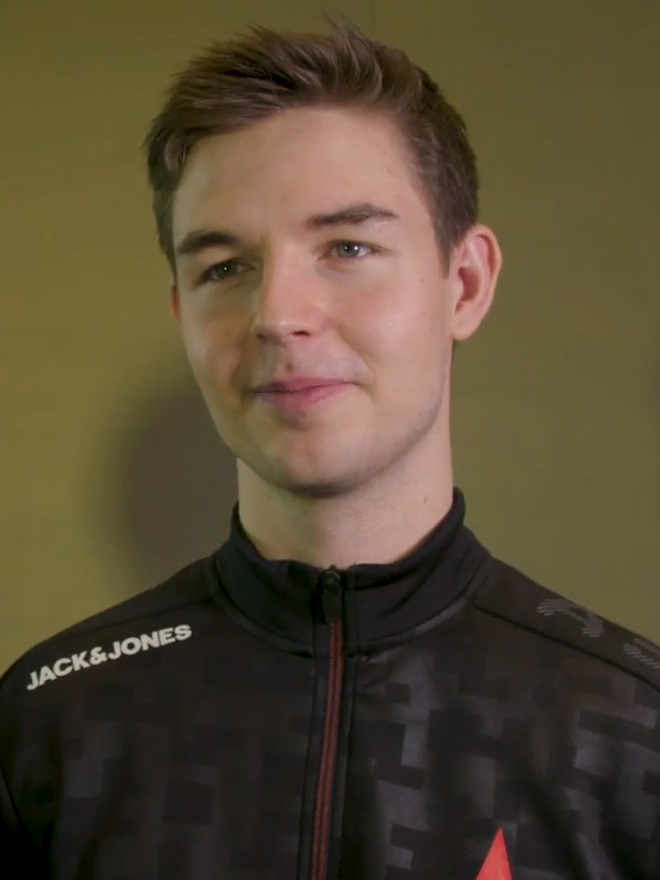
- Reedtz in 2020

Personal information
- Name: Nicolai Reedtz
- Nickname(s): sundev1ce, devve, devveking, device
- Born: 8 September 1995 (age 31)
- Nationality: Danish

Current team
- Team: 100 Thieves
- Role: AWPer
- Game: Counter-Strike 2

Career information
- Games: Counter-Strike: Source; Counter-Strike: Global Offensive; Counter-Strike 2

Team history
- 2013–2014: Copenhagen Wolves
- 2014–2015: Dignitas
- 2015: Team SoloMid
- 2016–2021: Astralis
- 2021–2022: Ninjas in Pyjamas
- 2022–2026: Astralis
- 2026–present: 100 Thieves

Career highlights and awards
- 4× CS:GO Major champion (Atlanta 2017, London 2018, Katowice 2019, Berlin 2019); 2× HLTV Major MVP (London 2018, Berlin 2019); IEM Grand Slam champion (Season 1); 9× HLTV Top 20 Player of the Year (2014–2021, 2023); 19× HLTV MVP

Nicolai Hvilshøj Reedtz (born 8 September 1995), known by the pseudonym dev1ce (pronounced and sometimes spelled as device, formerly devve), is a Danish professional Counter-Strike 2 player for 100 Thieves. On his first stint in Astralis, he became the first (along with three of his then-teammates) to win four Majors in Counter-Strike: Global Offensive (CS:GO), and to win three consecutive Majors. He is regarded as one of the best players of all time in CS:GO, consistently playing at a very high individual level since 2014. He ranked as the No. 2 player in the world by HLTV in 2018, and the No. 3 player in 2015, 2016, 2019 and 2020.

== Early life ==
Dev1ce was born on 8 September 1995 in Vejle, Region of Southern Denmark. He began playing video games when he was a teen with his brother as his talent was immediately noticeable. He was also an exceptional badminton player. In fact, at age 14, approximately two years after the creation of his Steam account, the big clubs in Denmark wanted him to play for them. He turned their offers down, citing a knee injury and a higher level of passion for video games. He began his esports career in Counter-Strike: Source, playing for Copenhagen Wolves.

== Career ==
=== 2013 ===
Dev1ce's first official CS:GO debut was with the Swedish team Fnatic as a temporary stand-in in March 2013 in the ESL Major Series One – Spring 2013: Cup #4. After that, he started in the Copenhagen Wolves team with Nico, cajunb, dupreeh and FeTiSh. He won several small events with Copenhagen Wolves and in the DreamHack Winter 2013, the biggest event in 2013, he finished at fifth to eighth place.

=== 2014 ===
In February 2014 he was hired by the United Kingdom organization Team Dignitas with cajunb, dupreeh, Xyp9x and FeTiSh (FeTiSh was replaced with Karrigan in December 2014). Dev1ce played well with this team but never won first place in any tournament; they often won third place. He claimed the 20th place in a top 20 CS:GO players in the world of 2014.

=== 2015 ===
In 2015, with the same lineup, they switched to the American organization Team SoloMid (TSM). Dev1ce started with the new organization and competed in many tournaments and won the top place. He finished the year being number 3 out of the top 20 players in the world on HLTV.org.

=== 2016-2018 ===
At the end of 2015, dev1ce and teammates separated from Team SoloMid and continued without any organization with the same teammates in the team named Question Mark. In January 2016, they created their own organization called “Astralis”. At the end of 2016, he claimed the 3rd place in top a 20 players in the world of 2016. In 2017, Astralis won the major tournament ELEAGUE Major 2017 and claimed the 1st team ranking in the world in 2017 and have been so throughout most of 2018 on HLTV.org. Device placed #2 in 2018, surpassing GeT_RiGhT's record for the most tournament MVP's earned in a single year (6 in 2013), earning his seventh at the ECS S6 Finals.

=== 2019–present ===
Dev1ce won four Major titles with Astralis and two MVP titles at the FACEIT Major: London 2018 and the StarLadder Major: Berlin 2019. On 23 April 2021 he joined Ninjas in Pyjamas (NIP). On 27 October 2022, dev1ce rejoined Astralis on a multi-year deal.

Dev1ce was named listed on Forbes 30 Under 30 Europe: Sports & Games in 2020.
