= Gleave =

Gleave is a surname. Notable people with the surname include:

- Alfred Gleave (1911–1999), Canadian politician
- Elliot Gleave (born 1982), stage name Example, English singer, songwriter, and rapper
- Fred Gleave, English rugby league footballer in the 1900s and 1910s
- Joseph Lea Gleave (1907–1965), British architect
- Lisa Gleave (born 1976), Australian-American glamour model and TV personality
- Martin Gleave, Canadian surgeon and cancer researcher
- Robert Gleave, professor of Arabic studies
- Todd Gleave (born 1995), English rugby union player
- Tom Gleave (1908–1993), British RAF fighter pilot during the Second World War
- William Richard Gleave (1868–1933), English surveyor and architect

== See also ==
- Gleaves, another surname
