= Coldzera =

Brazilian esports player

coldzera
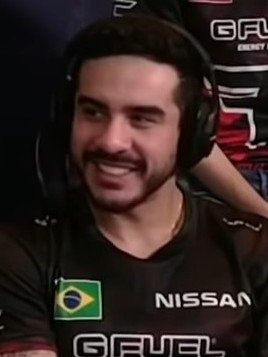
- coldzera in 2020

Personal information
- Name: Marcelo Augusto David
- Nickname: Cold
- Born: 31 October 1994 (age 32)
- Nationality: Brazilian

Current team
- Team: Oddik
- Role: Rifler (lurker)
- Game: Counter-Strike: Global Offensive Counter-Strike 2

Career information
- Playing career: 2014–present

Team history
- 2014–2015: Dexterity Team
- 2015–2016: Luminosity Gaming
- 2016–2018: SK Gaming
- 2018–2019: MIBR
- 2019–2021: FaZe Clan
- 2021: Complexity Gaming
- 2022–2023: 00 Nation
- 2023: Fake Natty
- 2023–2024: Legacy
- 2024–2025: RED Canids
- 2025: ODDIK
- 2025-present: Fake do Biru

Career highlights and awards
- 2× CS:GO Major champion (Columbus 2016, Cologne 2016); 2× HLTV Player of the Year (2016, 2017); HLTV Top 20 Player of the Year (2018); 2× HLTV Major MVP (Columbus 2016, Cologne 2016); 6× HLTV MVP; 2× EPL Champion (Season 3, Season 6)

Marcelo Augusto David (born 31 October 1994), better known as coldzera, is a Brazilian professional Counter-Strike 2 player and a former professional Counter Strike: Global Offensive player who currently plays for Fake do Biru. He is widely considered as one of the greatest players in Counter Strike history, He was named the best CS:GO player in both 2016 and 2017 by Counter Strike news website HLTV.

== Career ==
In August 2015, coldzera was signed by Luminosity Gaming, his first contract. His first tournament for the new team was ESL One Cologne 2015, where he managed to get his team through the group stage to reach the quarterfinals of the tournament.

=== Jumping AWP play ===
In 2016, coldzera, along with his team Luminosity, managed to get out of the group stage in every tournament they participated in, bar one, with two finals appearances. However, it was not until April that they were able to win their first tournament: MLG Columbus 2016. During the semi-final of the tournament, coldzera produced a notable play against Team Liquid on the map Mirage, eliminating four opponents with an AWP while defending the B bombsite. His jumping no-scope shot killed EliGE and s1mple with a single bullet. The play helped Luminosity recover from a 15–9 deficit to win the map in overtime, before winning the series and the tournament. In recognition of coldzera's play, Valve added graffiti depicting a winged AWP with four skulls and no scope to the B bombsite on Mirage.

Coldzera was selected as the Most Valuable Player for the tournament, making him the first Brazilian win the award at a Major. After this, his team won two more tournaments for the Luminosity organization: DreamHack Austin and ESL Pro League Season 3. The team's last tournament for the organization was ECS Season 1, where they finished second, losing to the G2 Esports team. In July 2016 the five players who played for Luminosity Gaming were hired by the organization SK Gaming.

The team's first championship for the new organization was ESL One: Cologne 2016 in July, just days after the acquisition by SK Gaming was announced. Again, the team managed to take first place, becoming a two-time Major winning roster, a feat that only the Swedish Fnatic team and the French LDLC/EnVyUs lineup had ever achieved. Coldzera again took the tournament's MVP award. As a result of these performances and the team's dominance, coldzera was ranked as the top player in the world by HLTV in both 2016 and 2017.

On June 23, 2018, coldzera, Fer, FalleN, Stewie2K and boltz were signed by Made In Brazil, with a lineup that had only formed shortly before moving to the new team, with boltz and Stewie2k replacing TACO and felps. Without much success, tarik joined the team and boltz left the team, but even still with this lineup, cold and his team only won the 2018 ZOTAC Cup Masters, and did not achieve expected levels of performance. Then, on December 21, 2018, the organization announced the return of TACO, felps and zews. With this line, coldzera stood out individually, but that was not enough to yield great achievements as his team did not work collectively, but this individual highlight earned him the tenth position in the top 20 best players in the world in 2018, according to HLTV.org.

On July 12, 2019, it was confirmed by MIBR that coldzera would go to the team bench and zews would provisionally take his place, eventually playing the Major in Germany. On September 25, coldzera officially left MIBR and was transferred to FaZe Clan.

== Awards and recognition ==
- Was voted the best player of 2016 by HLTV.org.
- Was voted the best player of 2017 by HLTV.org.
- Was voted the 10th best player of 2018 by HLTV.org.
- Was voted the MVP of 8 different tournaments, including 2 Major MVPs.
