= Broky =

Latvian Counter-Strike player

broky
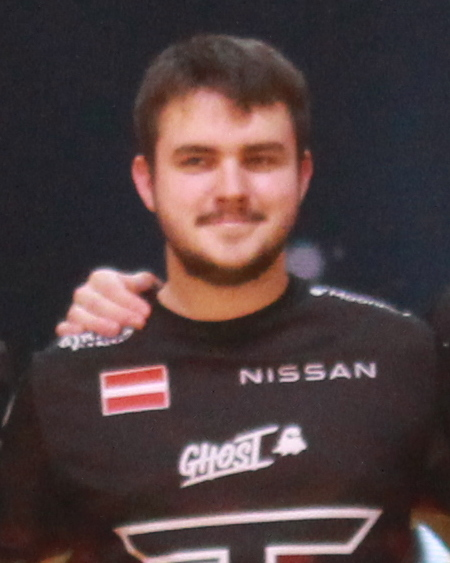
- Saukants at PGL Major Antwerp 2022

Personal information
- Name: Helvijs Saukants
- Born: 14 February 2001 (age 25)
- Nationality: Latvian

Current team
- Team: FaZe Clan
- Role: AWPer
- Game: Counter-Strike 2

Career information
- Playing career: 2019–present

Team history
- 2019: Epsilon
- 2019–2026 (Benched): FaZe Clan

Career highlights and awards
- CS:GO Major champion (Antwerp 2022); IEM Grand Slam champion (Season 4); 4x HLTV Top 20 Player of the Year (2021–2024); 3x HLTV MVP

Helvijs Saukants (born February 14, 2001), better known as broky, is a Latvian former professional Counter-Strike 2 player for FaZe Clan as the AWPer and a former Counter-Strike: Global Offensive player.

He is the first and only Counter-Strike player from Latvia to have won a major – the largest and most notable tournament in the game.

Saukants is also the first esports player to be nominated as Latvia's Sportsman of the Year in the Technical Sports category.

== Career ==
Saukants started his professional career in January 2019 with team Epsilon Esports. In September 2019 he moved to the Faze Clan team. With his new team he achieved a win at the BLAST Pro Series: Copenhagen 2019 in 2019, a 3rd–4th place. Place at the Intel Extreme Masters XIV – Beijing and fourth place at the BLAST Pro Series: Global Final 2019.

In 2022, he won the IEM Katowice 2022 with a 3–0 win against G2 Esports and then the ESL Pro League Season 15. For his achievements, he was recognized by HLTV as the best player in a tournament for the first time at IEM Katowice. He then won his first major tournament with the PGL Major Antwerp 2022 after a 2–0 win against Natus Vincere. The same year he also won the IEM Cologne 2022 with a 3–2 win against Natus Vincere. He also reached the finals of the Roobet Cup and the Blast Premier: Fall Finals 2022. For his individual achievements, he received another MVP award in the Blast Premier: Fall Finals 2022. He was also voted 6th in the list of best players.

In 2024, he competed in the PGL Major Copenhagen 2024 finals, marking the second time on the grand final stage in the most notable event in Counter-Strike. This time, FaZe Clan lost to NAVI with a score of 1–2 and placed 2nd in the tournament. After the major, he with his team FaZe Clan participated in IEM Chengdu 2024 and won the 1st place with a score 2–0 against Mouz. he also made the finals in Perfect world Shanghai major 2024, where he lost to Team Spirit

With prize money of over $1,000,000, he is Latvia's most successful e-athlete in terms of prize money as well as the first one to cross the $1 million mark in winnings.

== Notable achievements ==
Placement	Tier	Type	Tournament	Team	Date	Prize
2nd place, silver medalist(s)	S-Tier	LAN	Starladder Budapest Major 2025	FaZe Clan	2025-12-14	$170,000
2nd place, silver medalist(s)	S-Tier	LAN	Perfect World Shanghai Major 2024	FaZe Clan	2024-12-15	$170,000
1st place, gold medalist(s)	S-Tier	LAN	IEM Chengdu 2024	FaZe Clan	2024-4-14	$100,000
2nd place, silver medalist(s)	S-Tier	LAN	PGL CS2 Copenhagen Major 2024	FaZe Clan	2024-3-31	$170,000
2nd place, silver medalist(s)	S-Tier	LAN	IEM Katowice 2024	FaZe Clan	2024-2-11	$180,000
2nd place, silver medalist(s)	S-Tier	LAN	BLAST Premier: World Final 2023	FaZe Clan	2023-12-17	$250,000
1st place, gold medalist(s)	S-Tier	LAN	CS Asia Championships 2023	FaZe Clan	2023-11-12	$250,000
1st place, gold medalist(s)	S-Tier	Online	Thunderpick World Championship 2023	FaZe Clan	2023-11-05	$250,000
1st place, gold medalist(s)	S-Tier	LAN	Intel Extreme Masters Sydney 2023	FaZe Clan	2023-10-22	$100,000
1st place, gold medalist(s)	S-Tier	LAN	Intel Grand Slam Season 4	FaZe Clan	2023-03-26	$1,000,000
1st place, gold medalist(s)	S-Tier	LAN	ESL Pro League Season 17	FaZe Clan	2023-03-26	$200,000
1st place, gold medalist(s)	S-Tier	LAN	Intel Extreme Masters XVII – Cologne	FaZe Clan	2022-07-17	$400,000
1st place, gold medalist(s)	S-Tier	LAN	PGL Major Antwerp 2022	FaZe Clan	2022-05-22	$500,000
1st place, gold medalist(s)	S-Tier	LAN	ESL Pro League Season 15	FaZe Clan	2022-04-10	$190,000
1st place, gold medalist(s)	S-Tier	LAN	Intel Extreme Masters XVI – Katowice	FaZe Clan	2022-02-27	$400,000

== Individual awards and accolades ==
=== MVPs ===
Was named the HLTV MVP of the following tournaments:

- IEM Katowice 2022
- BLAST Premier: Fall Finals 2022
- IEM Chengdu 2024

=== Best Player Awards ===
Was ranked as one of the best player of the year by HLTV:

- 20th best player of 2021
- 6th best player of 2022
- 10th best player of 2023
- 8th best player of 2024
