= HLTV =

Counter-Strike news website and forum

- Owner: Better Collective
- Founders: Martin "Rosenchef" Rosenbæk; Per "Nomad" Lambæk
- Editors: Lucas "LucasAM" Aznar Miles; Luis "MIRAA" Mira; Milan "Striker" Švejda; Zvonimir "Professeur" Burazin; Bünyamin "BenjaCS" Bektaş
- Key people: Martin "Rosenchef" Rosenbæk (CEO); Per "Nomad" Lambæk (CTO); Petar "Tgwri1s" Milovanovic (CCO)
- Website: www.hltv.org
- Current status: Active

HLTV, formerly an initialism of Half-Life Television, is a news website and forum which covers professional Counter-Strike 2 esports news, tournaments and statistics. It is one of the leading websites within the Counter-Strike community with over 4 million unique visitors each month. In February 2020, the site was acquired by the sports betting group Better Collective.

== History ==
HLTV's old logo

HLTV was founded in 2002 by Martin "Martin" Rosenbæk and Per "Nomad" Lambæk. It was initially created to host recordings of Counter-Strike 1.6 matches, although it grew to include Counter-Strike and Half-Life news. HLTV started storing GOTV demos for Counter-Strike: Global Offensive when they were introduced in 2012. It has since evolved to include news, statistics, and analysis for the professional esports scene of Global Offensive.

Since late 2015, HLTV ranks the teams based on their own rating system. HLTV have awarded Most Valuable Player (MVP) medals to the highest performing player at each tournament. They also award Exceptionally Valuable Player (EVP) medals to players putting in an above average performance. In 2016, HLTV launched dust2.dk, a website dedicated to the Counter-Strike scene in Denmark. They followed this up in 2017 by launching dust2.us, a local website for the Americas. Data, such as professional match results, are fed through from the subsidiary websites to HLTV. Since 2010 with the first version of Counter-Strike, HLTV has ranked all the professional Counter-Strike players based on their performance that year. In May 2019, HLTV was officially integrated into Global Offensive, providing professional tournament schedules using data from HLTV.

HLTV has received many visual updates throughout the years, with the most recent one taking place in 2017.

In 2020, HLTV announced that it and sister site dust2.dk had been acquired by Better Collective, a sports betting group based in Denmark.

== HLTV rating ==
The HLTV rating is the most widely used rating system in Counter Strike 2, and is often used outside of HLTV.

=== Rating 1.0 ===
Rating 1.0 was introduced to HLTV in 2010 with the first version of Counter-Strike. This rating was based on the number of kills per round, the survival rate of a player per round, and the amount of multikills a player got, which is known as the impact rating. The higher each of these values are, the higher rating a player would get. The HLTV 1.0 rating came under criticism for being too similar to the Kill/Death ratio.

=== Rating 2.0 ===
Rating 2.0 was introduced to HLTV on June 6, 2017, as an update to Rating 1.0. Added were two new factors, Kill/Assist/Survival/Traded (KAST) and Average Damage per Round (ADR), along with a changed impact rating. KAST measures the percentage of rounds where a player contributes by killing an enemy, assisting a teammate, surviving a round or getting revenge on an enemy for killing a teammate, known as trading. Impact rating is based on the number of multi-kills, opening kills, 1vX situations (clutches) won and other undisclosed factors. Rating 2.0 is meant to be more accurate than Rating 1.0, since it includes more factors to measure the player's performance. Despite these new adjustments, it is still considered by some to not cover enough. Generally speaking, AWPers and so-called "star riflers" are favored by this rating. The sniper generally has a higher K/D ratio due to the nature of the weapon, while the star riflers will be put in the most impactful positions on the map. Meanwhile, the players who set up the star players will generally not be favored by this system. This can be through the form of a sacrificial entry fragger who will be traded or a support player throwing utility from the back.

=== Rating 2.1 ===
Rating 2.1 was introduced in October 2024 to refine the Rating 2.0 formula for Counter-Strike 2. Key changes include reducing the reward for saving in lost rounds, rebalancing sub-ratings for consistency, and updating averages to align with CS2's mechanics, such as MR12 format and 26-damage assists. This update restores the average player rating to 1.00 over an event, as originally intended for Rating 2.0.

The five sub-ratings—Kill, Survival, Damage, KAST, and Impact—were recalibrated to carry equal weight. Saving without contributing to the round now impacts ratings negatively, while assisted kills are rewarded more than before. These changes aim to better reflect player contributions, penalizing passive playstyles and rewarding impactful actions.

Rating 2.1 is seen as an interim solution while a broader Rating 3.0 overhaul is under development.

=== Rating 3.0 ===
Rating 3.0 was introduced in August 2025 as an update to Rating 2.1. A significant overhaul of its Counter-Strike 2 player rating system, introducing a new "Round Swing" metric to assess player impact on round win probability, removing the old Impact rating, and implementing economy-adjusted stats for all metrics, which gives more value to kills in harder economic situations and less to "eco frags". Assists were reset to CS:GO value of 40 damage for all purposes, and a concept of Trade Denials.

The six sub-ratings—Kill, Survival, Damage, KAST, Multi-Kills and brand new Round Swing are now adjusted based on economy. Round Swing replaces Impact and measures a team's win probability before and after each kill, factoring in map, side, and round economy, while kills against players with superior gear are weighted more heavily than players who "eco frags" (kills against players on a low buy). Round Swing also assigns credit for kills based on damage share, flash assists, and whether it was a trade kill. Trade Denials were also introduced as a concept on Rating 3.0. It accounts for a player's ability to prevent an enemy from trading their teammate's kill. A positive "trade denial" occurs when a player successfully prevents a death and denies an opponent an easy kill that would be a "trade kill", and failed trades (punishing the second player, and rewarding the first, if both die within 5 seconds) within the sub-ratings. The new changes are intended to provide more nuanced and accurate reflection of player performance by incorporating contextual factors like economic situations into the rating calculations.

== HLTV MVPs ==
HLTV awards an MVP medal at notable events, which is given to the player they consider had the most impact in the tournament. Starting in 2016, players who win an MVP award are provided a physical medal which are either gold, silver or bronze depending on the significance of the event which it was awarded.

== Hall Of Fame ==
In November 2024, HLTV announced the Hall of Fame, an award given to honor notable retired professional Counter-Strike players. Each Hall of Fame inductee will receive a Rolex watch featuring a Hall of Fame inscription on the back of the case. They will also receive a special player profile on the HLTV's website.

=== Inductees ===
==== 2024 ====
- Christopher "GeT_RiGhT" Alesund
- Patrik "f0rest" Lindberg
- Emil "HeatoN" Christensen
- Tommy "Potti" Ingemarsson

==== 2025 ====
- Raphael "'''cogu'''" Camargo
- Olof "olofmeister" Kajbjer
- Yegor "'''markeloff'''" Markelov

== HLTV Top 20 players ==
Each year, the HLTV staff rank professional Counter-Strike players based on their performance, and write an article explaining their choice. These rankings are based on how successful the player's team is, the individual performance based on the HLTV Rating 1.0 and Rating 2.0, and MVP/EVP awards given by HLTV. They have ranked both Counter-Strike and Global Offensive players. 2012 was excluded due to it being a transition year between Counter-Strike and Counter-Strike: Source to Global Offensive.

2010

1. Yegor "markeloff" Markelov
2. Christopher "GeT_RiGhT" Alesund
3. Martin "trace" Heldt
4. Sergey "starix" Ischuk
5. Ioann "Edward" Sukhariev
6. Patrik "f0rest" Lindberg
7. Filip "NEO" Kubski
8. Danny "zonic" Sørensen
9. Andreas "MODDII" Fridh
10. Marucus "delpan" Larsson
11. Jordan "n0thing" Gilbert
12. Rasmus "Gux" Ståhl
13. Christophe "SIXER" Xia
14. Danny "fRoD" Montaner
15. Roman "roman" Ausserdorfer
16. Johan "face" Klasson
17. Bum-Ki "peri" Jung
18. Richard "Xizt" Landström
19. Danylo "Zeus" Teslenko
20. Harley "dsn" Örwall

2011

1. Filip "NEO" Kubski
2. Christopher "GeT_RiGhT" Alesund
3. Yegor "markeloff" Markelov
4. Martin "trace" Heldt
5. Patrik "f0rest" Lindberg
6. Wiktor "TaZ" Wojtas
7. Michael "Friis" Jørgensen
8. Finn "karrigan" Andersen
9. Marcus "delpan" Larsson
10. Rasmus "Gux" Ståhl
11. Karl-William "kalle" Haraldsen
12. Eduard "ed1k" Ivanov
13. Richard "Xizt" Landström
14. Johan "face" Klasson
15. Ioann "Edward" Sukhariev
16. Andreas "MODDII" Fridh
17. Timi "aslak" Verkkoperä
18. Jarosław "pashaBiceps" Jarząbkowski
19. Mihail "Dosia" Stolyarov
20. Sergey "starix" Ischuk

2013

1. Christopher "GeT_RiGhT" Alesund
2. Patrik "f0rest" Lindberg
3. Richard "shox" Papillon
4. Mihail "Dosia" Stolyarov
5. Nathan "NBK-" Schmitt
6. Richard "Xizt" Landström
7. Adil "ScreaM" Benrlitom
8. Jesper "JW" Wecksell
9. Spencer "Hiko" Martin
10. Ladislav "GuardiaN" Kovács
11. Adam "friberg" Friberg
12. Kenny "kennyS" Schrub
13. Robin "flusha" Rönnquist
14. Nicolaj "Nico" Jensen
15. Yegor "markeloff" Markelov
16. Ioann "Edward" Sukhariev
17. Eduoard "SmithZz" Dubourdeaux
18. Peter "dupreeh" Rasmussen
19. Jarosław "pashaBiceps" Jarząbkowski
20. Andreas "Xyp9x" Højsleth

2014

1. Christopher "GeT_RiGhT" Alesund
2. Robin "flusha" Rönnquist
3. Jarosław "pashaBiceps" Jarząbkowski
4. Janusz "Snax" Pogorzelski
5. Jesper "JW" Wecksell
6. Kenny "kennyS" Schrub
7. Patrik "f0rest" Lindberg
8. Richard "shox" Papillon
9. Freddy "KRIMZ" Johansson
10. Vincent "Happy" Cervoni
11. Ladislav "GuardiaN" Kovács
12. Olof "olofmeister" Kajbjer
13. Paweł "byali" Bieliński
14. Adam "friberg" Friberg
15. Dan "apEX" Madesclaire
16. Peter "dupreeh" Rasmussen
17. Nathan "NBK-" Schmitt
18. Braxton "swag" Pierce
19. Fabien "KioShiMa" Fiey
20. Nicolai "dev1ce" Reedtz

2015

1. Olof "olofmeister" Kajbjer
2. Ladislav "GuardiaN" Kovács
3. Nicolai "dev1ce" Reedtz
4. Janusz "Snax" Pogorzelski
5. Robin "flusha" Rönnquist
6. Kenny "kennyS" Schrub
7. Freddy "KRIMZ" Johansson
8. Vincent "Happy" Schopenhauer
9. Nathan "NBK-" Schmitt
10. Jesper "JW" Wecksell
11. Christopher "GeT_RiGhT" Alesund
12. Peter "dupreeh" Rasmussen
13. Richard "shox" Papillon
14. Egor "flamie" Vasilyev
15. René "cajunb" Borg
16. Patrik "f0rest" Lindberg
17. Filip "NEO" Kubski
18. Dan "apEX" Madesclaire
19. Aleksi "allu" Jalli
20. Tyler "Skadoodle" Latham

2016

1. Marcelo "coldzera" David
2. Gabriel "FalleN" Toledo
3. Nicolai "dev1ce" Reedtz
4. Oleksandr "s1mple" Kostyliev
5. Janusz "Snax" Pogorzelski
6. Richard "shox" Papillon
7. Patrik "f0rest" Lindberg
8. Olof "olofmeister" Kajbjer
9. Adil "ScreaM" Benrlitom
10. Robin "flusha" Rönnquist
11. Nikola "NiKo" Kovač
12. Egor "flamie" Vasilyev
13. Kenny "kennyS" Schrub
14. Emil "Magisk" Reif
15. Fernando "fer" Alvarenga
16. Markus "Kjaerbye" Kjærbye
17. Ladislav "GuardiaN" Kovács
18. Christopher "GeT_RiGhT" Alesund
19. Lincoln "fnx" Lau
20. Dennis "dennis" Edman

2017

1. Marcelo "coldzera" David
2. Nikola "NiKo" Kovač
3. Fernando "fer" Alvarenga
4. Håvard "rain" Nygaard
5. Nicolai "dev1ce" Reedtz
6. Gabriel "FalleN" Toledo
7. Kenny "kennyS" Schrub
8. Oleksandr "s1mple" Kostyliev
9. Ladislav "GuardiaN" Kovács
10. Peter "dupreeh" Rasmussen
11. Abay "HObbit" Khassenov
12. Jonathan "EliGE" Jablonowski
13. Andreas "Xyp9x" Højsleth
14. Kristian "k0nfig" Wienecke
15. Markus "Kjaerbye" Kjærbye
16. Tomáš "oskar" Šťastný
17. Dauren "AdreN" Kystaubayev
18. Ricardo "boltz" Prass
19. Olof "olofmeister" Kajbjer
20. Janusz "Snax" Pogorzelski

2018

1. Oleksandr "s1mple" Kostyliev
2. Nicolai "dev1ce" Reedtz
3. Nikola "NiKo" Kovač
4. Denis "electronic" Sharipov
5. Peter "dupreeh" Rasmussen
6. Keith "NAF" Markovic
7. Emil "Magisk" Reif
8. Lukas "gla1ve" Rossander
9. Freddy "KRIMZ" Johansson
10. Marcelo "coldzera" David
11. Ladislav "GuardiaN" Kovács
12. Russel "Twistzz" Van Dulken
13. Andreas "Xyp9x" Højsleth
14. Tomáš "oskar" Štastný
15. Jonathan "EliGE" Jablonowski
16. Miika "suNny" Kemppi
17. Timothy "autimatic" Ta
18. Håvard "rain" Nygaard
19. Robin "ropz" Kool
20. Valdemar "valde" Bjørn Vangså

2019

1. Mathieu "ZywOo" Herbaut
2. Oleksandr "s1mple" Kostyliev
3. Nicolai "device" Reedtz
4. Jonathan "EliGE" Jablonowski
5. Emil "Magisk" Reif
6. Denis "electronic" Sharipov
7. Keith "NAF" Markovic
8. Vincent "Brehze" Cayonte
9. Russel "Twistzz" Van Dulken
10. Robin "ropz" Kool
11. Nikola "NiKo" Kovac
12. Özgür "woxic" Eker
13. Jere "sergej" Salo
14. Andreas "Xyp9x" Højslet
15. Justin "jks" Savage
16. Peter "dupreeh" Rasmussen
17. Freddy "KRIMZ" Johansson
18. Tsvetelin "CeRq" Dimitrov
19. Ludvig "Brollan" Brolin
20. Ethan "Ethan" Arnold

2020

1. Mathieu "ZywOo" Herbaut
2. Oleksandr "s1mple" Kostyliev
3. Nicolai "device" Reedtz
4. Nikola "NiKo" Kovač
5. Denis "electronic" Sharipov
6. Benjamin "blameF" Bremer
7. Robin "ropz" Kool
8. Jonathan "EliGE" Jablonowski
9. Peter "dupreeh" Rasmussen
10. Florian "syrsoN" Rische
11. Emil "Magisk" Reif
12. Martin "stavn" Lund
13. Nemanja "huNter-" Kovač
14. Yuri "yuurih" Santos
15. Ludvig "Brollan" Brolin
16. Henrique "HEN1" Teles
17. Freddy "KRIMZ" Johansson
18. Kaike "KSCERATO" Cerato
19. Justin "jks" Savage
20. Vincent "Brehze" Cayonte

2021

1. Oleksandr "s1mple" Kostyliev
2. Mathieu "ZywOo" Herbaut
3. Nikola "NiKo" Kovač
4. Dmitriy "sh1ro" Sokolov
5. Sergey "Ax1Le" Rykhtorov
6. Abai "HObbit" Khassenov
7. Denis "electroNic" Sharipov
8. Mareks "YEKINDAR" Gaļinskis
9. Valeriy "b1t" Vakhovskiy
10. Dzhami "Jame" Ali
11. Nicolai "dev1ce" Reedtz
12. Nemanja "huNter-" Kovač
13. Benjamin "blameF" Bremer
14. Keith "NAF" Markovic
15. Kaike "KSCERATO" Cerato
16. Martin "stavn" Lund
17. Russel "Twistzz" Van Dulken
18. Robin "ropz" Kool
19. Jonathan "EliGE" Jablonowski
20. Helvijs "broky" Saukants

2022

1. Oleksandr "s1mple" Kostyliev
2. Mathieu "ZywOo" Herbaut
3. Dmitry "sh1ro" Sokolov
4. Sergey "Ax1Le" Rykhtorov
5. Nikola "NiKo" Kovač
6. Helvijs "broky" Saukants
7. Ilya "m0NESY" Osipov
8. Robin "ropz" Kool
9. Kaike "KSCERATO" Cerato
10. Martin "stavn" Lund
11. Russel "Twistzz" Van Dulken
12. Benjamin "blameF" Bremer
13. Håvard "rain" Nygaard
14. Nemanja "huNter-" Kovač
15. Mareks "YEKINDAR" Gaļinskis
16. Valeriy "b1t" Vakhovskiy
17. David "frozen" Čerňanský
18. Lotan "Spinx" Giladi
19. Yuri "yuurih" Santos
20. Dzhami "Jame" Ali

2023

1. Mathieu "ZywOo" Herbaut
2. Nikola "NiKo" Kovač
3. Robin "ropz" Kool
4. Ilya "m0NESY" Osipov
5. Lotan "Spinx" Giladi
6. Álvaro "SunPayus" García
7. Oleksandr "s1mple" Kostyliev
8. Dmitry "sh1ro" Sokolov
9. Martin "stavn" Lund
10. Helvijs "broky" Saukants
11. Nicolai "dev1ce" Reedtz
12. David "frozen" Čerňanský
13. Nemanja "huNter-" Kovač
14. Guy "NertZ" Iluz
15. Jakob "jabbi" Nygaard
16. Benjamin "blameF" Bremer
17. Emil "Magisk" Reif
18. Casper "cadiaN" Møller
19. Kaike "KSCERATO" Cerato
20. Russel "Twistzz" Van Dulken

2024

1. Danil "donk" Kryshkovets
2. Ilya "m0NESY" Osipov
3. Mathieu "ZywOo" Herbaut
4. Nikola "NiKo" Kovač
5. Justinas "jL" Lekavičius
6. Dmitry "sh1ro" Sokolov
7. Shahar "flameZ" Shushan
8. Helvijs "broky" Saukants
9. Valeriy "b1t" Vakhovskiy
10. David "frozen" Čerňanský
11. Ihor "w0nderful" Zhdanov
12. Mario "malbsMd" Samayoa
13. Lotan "Spinx" Giladi
14. Dorian "xertioN" Berman
15. İsmailcan "XANTARES" Dörtkardeş
16. Mihai "iM" Ivan
17. Jimi "Jimpphat" Salo
18. Robin "ropz" Kool
19. Jonathan "EliGE" Jablonowski
20. Ádám "torzsi" Torzsás

2025

1. Mathieu "ZywOo" Herbaut
2. Danil "donk" Kryshkovets
3. Robin "ropz" Kool
4. Ilya "m0NESY" Osipov
5. Dmitry "sh1ro" Sokolov
6. Danil "molodoy" Golubenko
7. Shahar "flameZ" Shushan
8. David "frozen" Čerňanský
9. Kaike "KSCERATO" Cerato
10. Lotan "Spinx" Giladi
11. Russel "Twistzz" Van Dulken
12. William "mezii" Merriman
13. Azbayar "Senzu" Munkhbold
14. İsmailcan "XANTARES" Dörtkardeş
15. Mareks "YEKINDAR" Gaļinskis
16. Dorian "xertioN" Berman
17. Ádám "torzsi" Torzsás
18. Nikola "NiKo" Kovač
19. Mihai "iM" Ivan
20. Valeriy "b1t" Vakhovskiy
