= B1t =

Ukrainian esports player

b1t

Personal information
- Name: Валерій Євгенійович Ваховський (Valerii Yevheniiovych Vakhovskyi)
- Born: January 5, 2003 (age 23); Dnipro, Ukraine
- Nationality: Ukraine

Current team
- Team: NAVI
- Role: Rifler
- Game: Counter-Strike 2

Career information
- Playing career: 2019–present

Team history
- 2019–2021: NAVI junior
- 2021: NAVI (Substitute)
- 2021–present: NAVI

Career highlights and awards
- 4× HLTV Top 20 Player of the Year (2021, 2022, 2024, 2025); 2x Counter-Strike Major winner; 1× HLTV MVP; HLTV 2024 Anchor of the Year; IEM Grand Slam champion (Season 3)

Valerii Yevheniiovych Vakhovskyi (born January 5, 2003), better known as "b1t", (Note: Formerly stylized as B1T and B1t) is a Ukrainian professional Counter-Strike 2 player for Natus Vincere and a former Counter-Strike: Global Offensive player.

b1t is a young player in the Counter-Strike: Global Offensive and Counter-Strike 2 scene and named in the top 20 players worldwide. In 2021, he and the Natus Vincere roster (primarily composed of b1t, s1mple, Boombl4, Perfecto, and electronic) won the Intel Grand Slam, 4 tournaments from the ESL organization (including Intel Extreme Masters) and DreamHack during the gaming season. With this roster, NAVI came out on top in the Regional Qualifiers for the PGL Major 2021. They won IEM Cologne 2021, DreamHack Masters Spring 2021, and ESL Pro League Season 14. On November 7, 2021, b1t won his first Major, PGL Major Stockholm 2021.

On March 31, 2024, Vakhovskyi won his second Major, PGL CS2 Major Copenhagen 2024.

== Personal life ==
Vakhovskyi learned about Counter-Strike at a young age, when he saw his uncle play the game.

== Career ==
b1t's first notable success was the victory with team NOTBAD at the open qualifiers of the CIS Minor Championship – Berlin 2019. b1t then participated in Natus Vincere's "Esports Camp", a seasonal program throughout which aspiring professional gamers compete to join their youth roster, where he showed an outstanding performance and later became one of the first to receive an invitation to NAVI's "Junior" team.

=== NAVI ===
In late 2020, b1t became the sixth player of Natus Vincere's CS:GO team. He usually substituted flamie on map Inferno.

Between January 19 and 24, Vakhovskyi won the BLAST Premier Global Final 2020, and in April of the following year, he became part of the main roster, replacing flamie permanently.

On September 12, 2021, Vakhovskyi, along with NAVI, won the 3rd season of the IEM Grand Slam after NAVI winning the following events: IEM Katowice 2020, DreamHack Masters Spring 2021, IEM Cologne 2021, ESL Pro League Season 14 This made Valerii the youngest player to ever win the IEM Grand Slam at 18 years and 250 days old.

On November 7, 2021, b1t won his first Major PGL Major Stockholm 2021. 3 years later, on March 31, 2024, Vakhovskyi won his second Major PGL CS2 Major Copenhagen 2024.

On July 21, 2024, b1t earned his career first HLTV MVP at the 2024 Esports World Cup.

== Notable achievements ==
Placement	Tournament	Location	Date
With Natus Vincere
1st place, gold medalist(s)	BLAST Premier: Global Final 2020	Europe (Online)	January 19, 2021 – January 24, 2021
1st place, gold medalist(s)	BLAST Premier: Spring Groups 2021	Europe (Online)	February 4, 2021 – February 14, 2021
1st place, gold medalist(s)	DreamHack Masters Spring 2021	Europe (Online)	April 29, 2021 – May 9, 2021
2nd place, silver medalist(s)	Blast Premier: Spring Finals 2021	Europe (Online)	June 15, 2021 – June 20, 2021
1st place, gold medalist(s)	IEM Cologne 2021	Cologne, Germany	July 6, 2021 – July 18, 2021
1st place, gold medalist(s)	ESL Pro League Season 14	Europe (Online)	August 16 – September 12, 2021
1st place, gold medalist(s)	PGL Major Stockholm 2021	Stockholm, Sweden	October 26, 2021 – November 7, 2021
1st place, gold medalist(s)	Blast Premier: Fall Finals 2021	Copenhagen, Denmark	November 24, 2021 – November 28, 2021
1st place, gold medalist(s)	Blast Premier: World Final 2021	Copenhagen, Denmark	December 14, 2021 – December 19, 2021
2nd place, silver medalist(s)	PGL Major Antwerp 2022	Antwerp, Belgium	May 9, 2021 – May 22, 2021
1st place, gold medalist(s)	BLAST Premier: Spring Finals 2022	Lisbon, Portugal	June 15, 2021 – June 19, 2021
2nd place, silver medalist(s)	IEM Cologne 2022	Cologne, Germany	July 7, 2022 – July 17, 2022
3rd place, bronze medalist(s)	IEM Katowice 2023	Katowice, Poland	Feb 4 – 12, 2023
3rd place, bronze medalist(s)	ESL Pro League Season 17	Malta	Feb 22 – March 26, 2023
3rd place, bronze medalist(s)	IEM Rio 2023	Rio de Janeiro, Brazil	Apr 17 – 23, 2023
2nd place, silver medalist(s)	ESL Pro League Season 18	Malta	Aug 30 – October 1, 2023
3rd place, bronze medalist(s)	Blast Premier: World Final 2023	Abu Dhabi, UAE	Dec 13 – 17, 2023
1st place, gold medalist(s)	PGL CS2 Major Copenhagen 2024	Copenhagen, Denmark	Mar 21 – 31, 2024
2nd place, silver medalist(s)	Blast Premier: Spring Finals 2024	London, United Kingdom	Jun 12 – 16, 2024
1st place, gold medalist(s)	Esports World Cup 2024	Riyadh, Saudi Arabia	Jul 17 – 21, 2024
2nd place, silver medalist(s)	IEM Cologne 2024	Cologne, Germany	Aug 10 – 18, 2024
1st place, gold medalist(s)	ESL Pro League Season 20	Malta	Sep 3 – 22, 2024
2nd place, silver medalist(s)	Blast Premier: Fall Finals 2024	Copenhagen, Denmark	Sep 25 – 29, 2024
1st place, gold medalist(s)	IEM Rio 2024	Rio de Janeiro, Brazil	Oct 7 – 13, 2024
1st place, gold medalist(s)	StarLadder StarSeries Fall 2025	Budapest, Hungary	Sep 18 – 21, 2025
2nd place, silver medalist(s)	Thunderpick World Championship 2025	Malta	Oct 15 – 19, 2025
1st place, gold medalist(s)	ESL Pro League Season 23	Stockholm, Sweden	Mar 13 - 15, 2026
2nd place, silver medalist(s)	BLAST Open Rotterdam 2026	Rotterdam, Netherlands	Mar 18 - 29, 2026
2nd place, silver medalist(s)	BLAST Rivals 2026 Season 1	Fort Worth, Texas, United States	Apr 29 - May 3, 2026
1st place, gold medalist(s)	IEM Atlanta 2026	Atlanta, Georgia, United States	May 11 - May 17, 2026
