= Glave (disambiguation) =

A glave or glaive is a European pole weapon.

Glave, GLAVE, or Glaive may also refer to:

== People ==
- Edward James Glave (1863–1895), English travel writer
- Matthew Glave (born 1963), American actor
- Thomas Glave (born 1964), American author
- Marisa Glave (born 1981), Peruvian politician
- Romell Glave (born 1999), British sprinter
- Glaive (musician) (born 2005), American singer-songwriter
- Lukas Rossander (born 1995), Danish professional Counter-Strike player known by his nickname gla1ve

== Other ==
- "Glaive," a fictional weapon in the 1983 film Krull, which is actually most similar to a chakram in style
- Glaves
