= Xizt =

Swedish professional Counter-Strike 2 coach

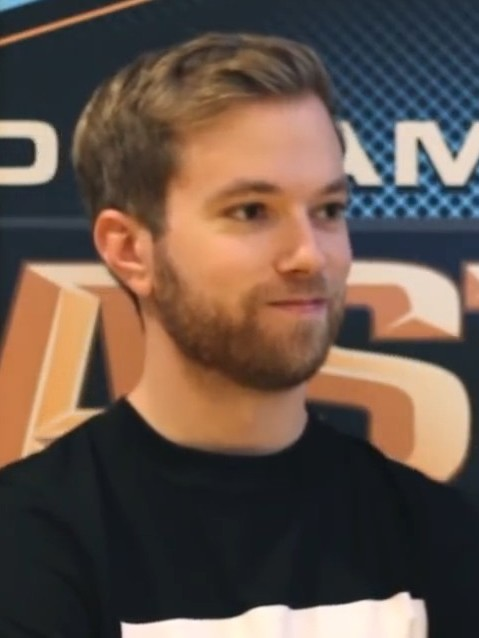
- Landström at DreamHack Masters Malmö 2017

Personal information
- Name: Richard Landström
- Born: 1991 or 1992 (age 34–35)
- Nationality: Swedish

Career information
- Games: Counter-Strike; Counter-Strike: Global Offensive; Counter-Strike 2
- Playing career: 2010–2021
- Role(s): Coach, Rifler, IGL
- Coaching career: 2021–present

Team history

As player:
- 2010: Oslo Lions
- 2010–2012: Fnatic
- 2012–2018: Ninjas in Pyjamas
- 2018–2020: Fnatic
- 2020–2021: Dignitas

As coach:
- 2021–2023: Heroic
- 2024–present: Ninjas in Pyjamas

Career highlights and awards
- CS:GO Major champion (Cologne 2014); HLTV Top 20 Player of the Year (2013); 2x HLTV MVP

Richard Landström, better known as Xizt, is a Swedish former professional Counter-Strike player and coach who is the current head coach of Ninjas in Pyjamas.

Until February 2018, he played for Ninjas in Pyjamas, but stepped down following a stretch of poor results. On March 11, 2018, he played for Fnatic as in-game leader to replace Golden. On January 21, 2020, he reunited with former teammates and was part of Dignitas's Male Counter-Strike: Global Offensive (CS:GO) Team. Landström's biggest result was winning ESL One Cologne 2014, one of Counter-Strike's majors.

== Playing career ==
Landström was the primary IGL for Ninjas in Pyjamas from the formation of the roster to him stepping down in February 2018. Even though he normally wasn't the best performing player on the NiP roster, HLTV ranked him among the top 20 players in 2010 (18th), 2011 (13th) and 2013 (6th).

In April 2018 Landström joined FaZe Clan as a substitute for Olofmeister due to him taking a short break from competitive Counter-Strike. In May 2018 Olofmeister rejoined FaZe Clan and Landström left.

On March 11, 2018, Landström signed with Fnatic. Many viewed this as a reunion as he had played with Fnatic before, in 2009–2012. He played with Fnatic until October 21, 2019, when he was benched by the organization from the active roster.

On September 18, 2019, Team Dignitas announced they would re-enter male competitive CS:GO. Later on January 21, 2020, Dignitas confirmed the signing of the former NiP roster of Patrik "F0rest" Lindberg, Christopher "GeT_RiGhT" Alesund, Adam "friberg" Friberg, and Richard "Xizt" Landström while adding rising Norwegian star Håkon "Hallzerk" Fjærli with Robin "Fifflaren" Johansson as a coach/manager.

Landström announced his retirement from competitive Counter-Strike on September 23, 2021, ending his 12-year professional career.

== Coaching career ==
Landström joined Heroic in October 2021 as an analyst and temporary coach for PGL Major Stockholm 2021. He became the team's full-time coach in March 2022, after signing a one-year contract extension.

Heroic announced the departure of Landström on December 12, 2023. He was replaced by previous ENCE coach Eetu "sAw" Saha.

In March 2024, Landström was named the head coach of Ninjas in Pyjamas, marking his return to the team after his six-year stint with the organization from 2012 to 2018.
