= Gleaves =

Gleaves is a (patronymic or paternal) family name. Variant spellings include Gleave, Glave and Glares.

Notable people with this surname include:

- Albert Gleaves (1858–1937), American admiral
- Richard Howell Gleaves (1819–1907), American lawyer, merchant and politician
- Nicholas Gleaves, English actor and playwright
- Sam Gleaves, English football manager

== See also ==
- Gleaves-class destroyer, named after Admiral Gleaves
  - USS Gleaves, lead ship of the class
