= GuardiaN =

Slovak professional Counter-Strike player

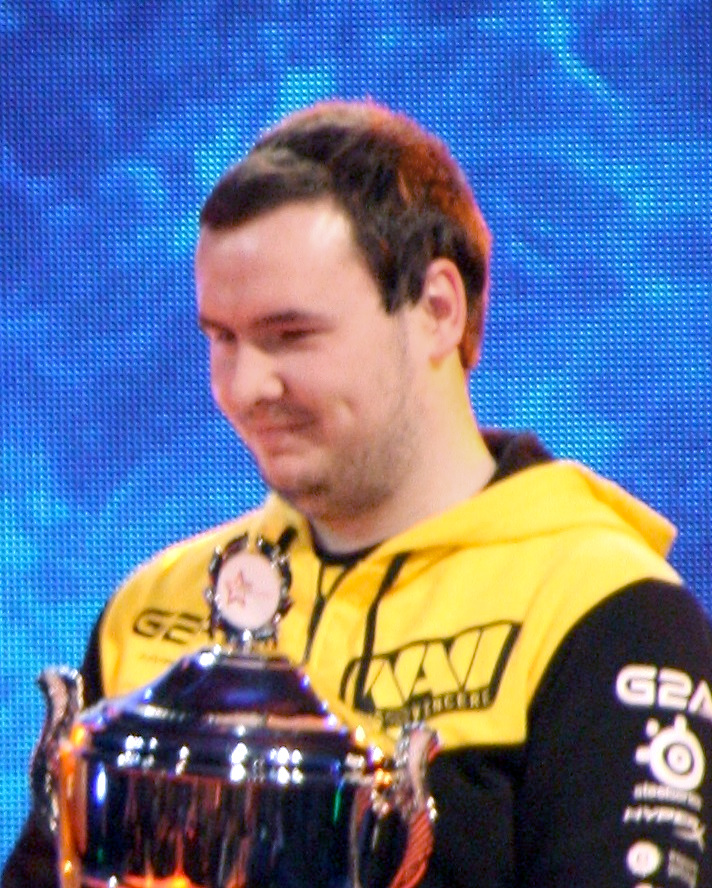
- GuardiaN at Dreamhack Leipzig 2016

Personal information
- Born: Ladislav Kovács; July 9, 1991 (age 35); Komárno, Slovakia

Career information
- Games: CS, CS:S, CS:GO
- Playing career: 2006–2022
- Role: AWPer

Team history
- 2013: 3DMAX
- 2013: Virtus.pro
- 2013–2017: Natus Vincere
- 2017–2019: FaZe Clan
- 2019–2021: Natus Vincere
- 2021: Trident Clan
- 2021: BEZ ZP
- 2021–2022: Team Singularity
- 2022: Team Sampi

Career highlights and awards
- 6x HLTV Top 20 Player of the Year (2013-2018); 8x HLTV MVP

Ladislav Kovács (born July 9, 1991), known professionally as GuardiaN, is a Slovak former professional Counter-Strike: Global Offensive (CS:GO), Counter-Strike: Source (CS:S) and Counter-Strike (CS) player. He is known for being one of the best players with the AWP and one of the best players overall. He played for team Natus Vincere (Na'Vi) for most of his career in CS:GO until entering free agency in February 2021. He announced his retirement on March 4, 2025.

== Professional career ==
Before the release of Counter-Strike : Global Offensive in 2012, the Slovak played both CS and CS:S professionally. He was first introduced to Counter-Strike by his brother, who bought the game on a CD when it was not well known at the time.

He liked the game, so he kept playing it and developing as a player and some time later he found himself a team and took part in his first LAN tournaments. Due to the low number of CS events at his home soil, he decided to switch onto CS:S. He had been playing for the ranks of Reason Gaming for two years. This led him to a lot of victories while playing CS:S. Despite having been offered a spot from a number of top European teams, GuardiaN switched back to CS and started playing for such squads as IQFIGHTERS, DEFEATERS, Corecell, and SGC as well as for his national team, Slovakia. In addition, he was frequently honored with a number of different awards (both as a team member and as a player).

GuardiaN moved on to CS:GO in the middle of 2012. He played for myDGB.net, ePz, TCM-Gaming and 3DMAX before playing well in the Virtus.pro roster. He joined the ranks of Natus Vincere in December 2013. After a 4-year long tenure with Natus Vincere, he left the organization in August 2017 to join FaZe Clan as the AWPer, taking over from Aleksi "allu" Jalli.

Despite saying that FaZe would be his last team, GuardiaN returned to Natus Vincere in September 2019. GuardiaN was benched in January 2020 to be replaced by Ilya "Perfecto" Zalutskiy.

During March 2020, GuardiaN was a stand-in for Dignitas at Flashpoint for Håkon "Hallzerk" Fjærli, due to visa issues.

GuardiaN has earned a total of $807,658 throughout his career in esports.

== Awards and recognition ==
- Was named the 10th best player of 2013 by HLTV.org.
- Was named the 11th best player of 2014 by HLTV.org.
- Was named the 2nd best player of 2015 by HLTV.org.
- Was named the 17th best player of 2016 by HLTV.org.
- Was named the 9th best player of 2017 by HLTV.org.
- Was named the 11th best player of 2018 by HLTV.org.
- Was named the MVP of 8 different tournaments.
