= Flusha =

Swedish eSports player

flusha
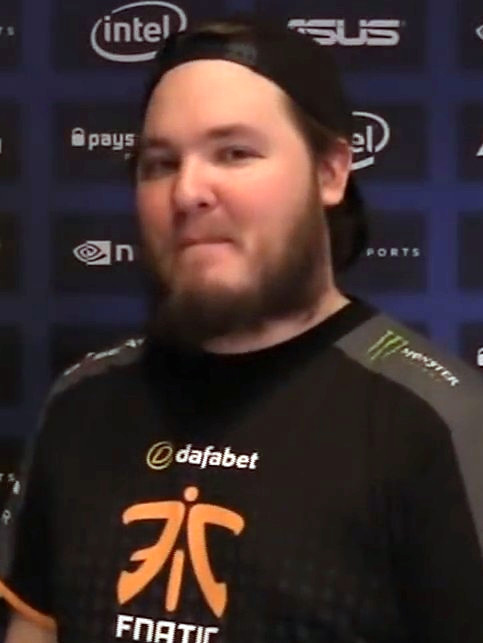
- flusha at ESL One Cologne 2016

Personal information
- Name: Robin Rönnquist
- Born: August 12, 1993 (age 33)
- Nationality: Swedish

Current team
- Team: EYEBALLERS
- Role: Rifler
- Game: Counter-Strike: Global Offensive

Career information
- Games: Counter-Strike 1.6; Counter-Strike: Global Offensive
- Playing career: 2011–2023

Team history
- 2012: SY_b
- 2012: Western Wolves
- 2013: Epsilon eSports
- 2013: SY_b
- 2013–2016: Fnatic
- 2016–2017: GODSENT
- 2017–2018: Fnatic
- 2018–2019: Cloud9
- 2019–2021: Fnatic
- 2021–2022: GORILLAZ
- 2022: Hellslayers
- 2022–2023: EYEBALLERS

Career highlights and awards
- 3× CS:GO Major champion (Jönköping 2013, Katowice 2015, Cologne 2015); 4× HLTV MVP; 4× HLTV Top 20 Player of the Year (2013-2016)

Robin Rönnquist (born August 12, 1993), better known as flusha, is a Swedish former professional Counter-Strike: Global Offensive player. He previously played for teams such as fnatic and Cloud9. flusha has won 3 CS:GO majors: Dreamhack Winter 2013, ESL One Katowice 2015 and ESL One Cologne 2015.

== Professional career ==
=== Counter-Strike 1.6 ===
flusha started playing Counter-Strike professionally in 2011. His team qualified, for Dreamhack Winter 2011, but ended up exiting out in the group stage. His teams did not qualify for any other significant events in 1.6.

=== Early Years in CS:GO ===
After transitioning to CS:GO, flusha wandered around many Swedish teams, including Epsilon eSports and Western Wolves. flusha was a part of the first lineup which defeated Ninjas in Pyjamas (NiP), the dominant team at the time, in an online match. flusha's team developed a reputation of being "onliners," a derogative term used to describe teams which perform better in online matches than ones in a LAN environment (LANs are used to describe tournaments where players play in the same building against each other). In March 2013, the team flusha was on at the time, Epsilon was disqualified RaidCall EMS One #1 after one of his teammates, Jerry "xelos" Råberg was found to be cheating. Epsilon finished 2nd at Dreamhack Summer 2013, placing behind Nip. The team was soon dropped, even after this result. They ended up being signed by fnatic, an organisation which has traditionally been behind the top Swedish rosters.

=== 2013 with fnatic ===
flusha's teammates in the first iteration of fnatic included Jesper "JW" Wecksell, Jonatan "devilwalk" Lundberg, Andreas "MODDII" Fridh, and Andreas "schneider" Lindberg.

==== Dreamhack Bucharest 2013 ====
At DreamHack Bucharest 2013, fnatic beat Nip in a group stage match. The tournament admins had the match played in a MR5 format, meaning each team will play 5 rounds as each side (Counter-Terrorist and Terrorist), and the team which reaches 6 wins the overtime match. If it's tied 5-5, another round of tiebreakers begin. According to DreamHack rules, the match should have been played in a MR3 tiebreaker format, where each team plays 3 rounds a side. Nip complained to the organisers, and DreamHack ordered the tiebreaker to be replayed, with fnatic up 2-1 from the first 3 rounds of the MR5 they played before. fnatic won the match, but afterwards, they refused to shake hands with Christopher "GeT_RiGhT" Alesund, and insulted Nip. flusha did not take part in the insults, and fnatic later apologised for the incident.

==== DreamHack Winter 2013 ====
flusha was briefly forced to take on the role of In-Game Leading, but the team soon signed a new IGL in the form of Markus "pronax" Wallsten in November 2013. fnatic consistently reached the playoffs, but they didn't win any tournaments until the first CS:GO major, Dreamhack Winter 2013. In the finals, fnatic beat the favourites, Nip in a 3 map series. On the first map Dust II, fnatic were down 12–3 at the end of the first half, but managed to make a comeback and win the map 16–14. On this map, flusha had 25 kills, and a 1.31 HLTV rating, the highest on the server. Despite the Ninjas winning the second map, Inferno, fnatic beat Nip 16–2 on the last map Train, winning them the major. flusha's teammate JW was awarded the MVP for this event; flusha was the 6th best rated at the event, and the 3rd best on his team. flusha was considered a consistent performer for fnatic, and was awarded the 13th spot on the HLTV top 20 in 2013.

=== 2014 ===
fnatic were not able to repeat the same form they had against Nip in the start of 2014, and at the first major of the year, EMS One Katowice, fnatic went out in the quarterfinals. fnatic would go out in groups at Dreamhack Summer 2014, and replaced schneider (also known as znajder) and Devilwalk with ex-LGB esports players Olof "olofmeister" Kajbjer and Freddy "KRIMZ" Johnasson. After a 3rd-place finish at Gfinity 3, fnatic came into the second major of the year, ESL One Cologne 2014 as one of the underdogs. fnatic topped their group, and faced Natus Vincere in the quarterfinals. flusha posted 30 kills on the third map, Nuke, and fnatic managed to win 16–14. After beating Dignitas, fnatic faced Nip in the finals. Even though Nip was considered as the best team in CS:GO at the time, they were in a major slump and were considered the underdogs by this point. Despite this, Nip won 13–16 on the third map, and won their first and only major. After this, fnatic would finally win their first event in 2014, at SLTV StarSeries X Finals, with flusha earning the MVP. After a semifinal finish at Dreamhack Masters Stockholm, fnatic won the next 3 tournaments. Unlike the earlier tournaments, flusha wasn't the best performer at two of these, and only won 1 MVP: Fragbite Masters Season 3.

==== Cheating Allegations ====
On November 20, Titan's AWPer Hovik "KQLY" Tomvassian and Epsilon's Gordon "Sf" Giry were VAC banned. There was already questions about many of flusha's plays after xelos' ban, but this caused a considerable amount of new speculation about flusha. NiP coach Faruk "pita" Pita, LDLC player Richard "shox" Papillon, and Jacob "Pimp" Winneche all called out flusha for cheating. pita called for flusha to be blocked from playing at DreamHack Winter 2014, saying "[It would be] a fcking disgrace...if @csgo_dev put flusha thru to play Dreamhack [Winter 2014]. Its obvious as it can be."

==== Dreamhack Winter 2014 ====
After winning the 3 previous LANs, fnatic came into DreamHack Winter 2014 as the favourites, with Team LDLC.com being considered the 2nd best team. fnatic came out of the groups 2–1, and faced LDLC in the quarterfinals. The series was tied 1-1, and on the 3rd map, Overpass, LDLC were up 13–3. fnatic then utilised a "boost," where players stand on top of other players' heads to gain height, and this allowed them to see over a wall. Olof "olofmeister" Kajbjer was boosted up, and fnatic utilised this advantage to win the game 16–13. LDLC protested that fnatic were using a "pixel-walk," but there was no section in the DreamHack rulebook prohibiting pixel-walks. It was later discovered the boost fnatic used meant they couldn't be shot from certain angles due to transparent textures, so the half was going to be replayed. However, further investigation by DreamHack revealed LDLC had used a similar boost in the first half, so the entire game was to be replayed. Due to fnatic's bad reputation at the time resulting from flusha's cheating accusations, fnatic faced considerable community backlash, and forfeited the match. LDLC went on to win the event.

=== 2015 ===
fnatic won ESL One Katowice 2015 at the start of the year. fnatic would continue to win numerous tournaments in 2015, including Dreamhack Open Tours 2015, Dreamhack Open Summer 2015, and ESL Pro League Season 1 Finals. fnatic also won ESL One Cologne 2015. flusha had a 1.38 HLTV rating at the event, and won the MVP (most valuable player) medal. At the time, fnatic were the only CS:GO lineup to win 2 majors in a row, 3 majors in total. Following this, fnatic would struggle to win tournaments and placed 5th-8th at the third major of the year, Dreamhack Open Cluj-Napoca 2015. Following internal divisions within the team, fnatic replaced IGL Markus "pronax" Wallsten with G2 Esports player Dennis "dennis" Edman, forcing flusha to once again take on In-Game Leading duties. flusha's personal form dropped off, but fnatic would win 3 tournaments in a row, FACEIT 2015 Stage 3 Finals, Fragbite Masters Season 5, and ESL Pro League Season 2 Finals.

=== 2016/2017 ===
At the start of 2016 with dennis, fnatic would win another 3 LANs, StarSeries Season XIV, ESL Barcelona, and IEM Katowice 2016. bringing their total streak up to 6. fnatic's string of results in late 2014 and early 2016/late 2015 has led to people calling this time period "the fnatic era" (sometimes only 2015). fnatic's dominance had ended after MLG Columbus 2016, where olofmeister suffered a hand injury. After not fnatic didn't find much success, flusha, along with teammates JW and KRIMZ decided to join pronax's team, GODSENT. GODSENT would struggle to place throughout the rest of 2016, with their best result being a semifinals finish at DreamHack Winter 2016. GODSENT went on to place 9th-11th at ELEAGUE Major: Atlanta 2017; flusha and JW subsequently returned to fnatic. Despite these changes, fnatic would continue their slump, and did not have any major results during 2017. In August 2017, fnatic's star player, olofmeister, departed fnatic for FaZe Clan.

=== 2018–2022 ===
After struggling for results for the past two years, fnatic had an upset victory at IEM Katowice 2018. flusha would be awarded the MVP after two aces against FaZe in the final map of the finals. fnatic followed this up by winning World Electronic Sports Games 2018, taking the largest prize in the game at the time, $800,000. Even with these results, fnatic would soon make more roster changes after a few poor performances, dropping In-Game Leader Maikil "Golden" Selim. After failing to make the playoffs of a CS:GO major for the first time, fnatic decided to replace flusha. flusha joined North American team Cloud9 in September. flusha once again acted as the In-Game Leader, but Cloud9 had one notable result, a second-place finish at the ELEAGUE CS:GO Invitational 2019. After a period of inactivity, flusha returned to fnatic in September 2019. flusha continued playing in the Professional CSGO ESL Challenger League and was a member of the team EYEBALLERS.

=== 2023 ===
In August 2023, flusha announced his retirement from professional CS:GO.
