= EliGE =

American professional Counter-Strike player

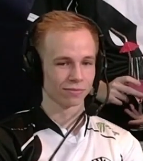

Personal information
- Name: Jonathan Jablonowski
- Born: 16 July 1997 (age 29)
- Nationality: American

Current team
- Team: Team Liquid
- Role: Entry Fragger
- Games: Counter-Strike: Global Offensive; Counter-Strike 2

Career information
- Playing career: 2013–present
- Role: Entry Fragger

Team history
- 2014: Justus Pro
- 2015: Elevate
- 2015–2023: Team Liquid
- 2023–2024: Complexity Gaming
- 2025: FaZe Clan
- 2025–present: Team Liquid

Career highlights and awards
- IEM Grand Slam champion (Season 2); 6× HLTV Top 20 Player of the Year (2017–2021, 2024); 4× HLTV MVP; 35x HLTV EVP

Jonathan Jablonowski, better known as EliGE is an American professional Counter-Strike 2 player. Currently playing for Team Liquid, he is considered to be the greatest American Counter-Strike player of all time. On 7 July 2019, Jablonowski and his teammates on Liquid won an Intel Grand Slam in a record 63 days, and he was ranked the No. 4 player in the world by HLTV that year.

== Personal life ==
Jonathan was born in Carbondale, Pennsylvania in 1997 to Loretta Jablonowski. He has an older brother and sister and a twin sister. He is of Polish descent. He has enjoyed video games since the time he was four. During that period, his brother played games quite often. So, EliGE wanted to play the same games as his older brother and become better than him. He claims that this rivalry at a young age made him as competitive as he is today.

Jablonoski was the valedictorian at his High School and was named a scholar of the year.

== Individual awards and accolades ==
Rankings

- HLTV Top 20 Players: 12th (2017), 15th (2018), 4th (2019), 8th (2020), 19th (2021), 19th (2024)

MVP

- DreamHack Masters Dallas 2019
- ESL Pro League Season 9 Finals
- IEM Chicago 2019
- ESL Pro League Season 11 North America

Other awards

- Intel Grand Slam Season 2 Winner
