= KennyS =

French professional CS:GO player

kennyS
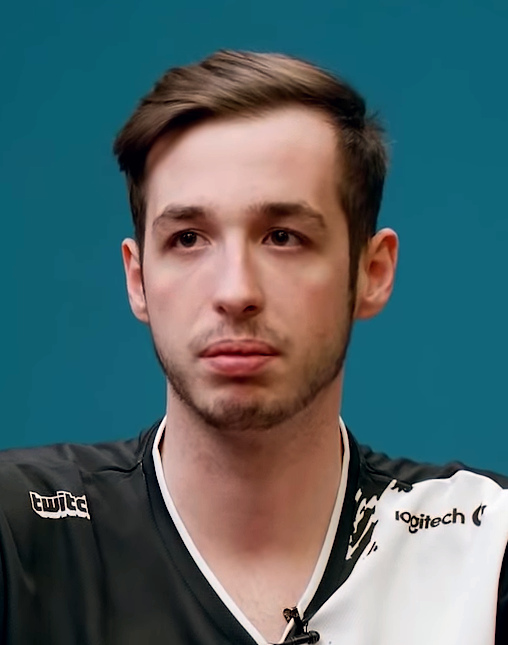
- Schrub in 2019

Personal information
- Name: Kenny Schrub
- Born: May 19, 1995 (age 31); Sarrebourg (Moselle, France)
- Nationality: French

Career information
- Games: Counter-Strike: Source; Counter-Strike: Global Offensive
- Playing career: 2012–2023

Team history
- 2012–2013: VeryGames
- 2014: Clan-Mystik
- 2014–2015: Titan
- 2015–2017: Team EnVyUs
- 2017–2022: G2 Esports
- 2022–2023: Team Falcons

Career highlights and awards
- CS:GO Major champion (Cluj-Napoca 2015); 5x HLTV Top 20 Player of the Year (2013–2017); HLTV Major MVP (Cluj-Napoca 2015); 9x HLTV MVP

Kenny Schrub (born May 19, 1995 in Sarrebourg (Moselle, France)), better known as kennyS, is a French former professional Counter-Strike: Global Offensive player. He was named "eSports Player of the Year" at The Game Awards 2015. He was considered the best sniper in the game, and Duncan Shields, a Counter-Strike analyst, has called him the best player in the game prior to the sniper being changed. Some of his previous teams include Titan, VeryGames, Team LDLC.com, Recursive eSports, Clan-Mystik, Team EnVyUs and G2 Esports. He was a professional Counter-Strike: Source player before transitioning to Global Offensive in 2012. Schrub announced his retirement from competitive Counter-Strike on May 20, 2023, before the semifinal between Team Vitality and Apeks at the Blast Paris Major in Paris and one day following his 28th birthday.

== Early life ==
Schrub started playing Counter-Strike at a young age in France. He was introduced to Counter-Strike at the age of 6 by his brother; he and his brothers have a 10-year age difference, but by the age of 8, Schrub was already better than his brothers. When he was 11, they decided to enter a local tournament and won. After this victory, his brother pushed him to pursue his dream of becoming a professional player. His skill led him to be invited to tournaments in Arles.

== Career ==
=== VeryGames ===
Schrub began his professional Counter-Strike career in earnest in 2012, joining team VeryGames to compete in Counter-Strike: Source. Shortly afterwards, he transitioned to playing Counter-Strike: Global Offensive. He and the team reached the finals of DreamHack Valencia, ESWC, DreamHack Winter, and ESH Prague; all four times, they fell to Ninjas in Pyjamas. In May 2013, VeryGames released Schrub after internal disputes with the team.

=== Titan ===
After playing in several lower-tier tournaments for over a year, Schrub joined Titan, a team that had acquired the members of Schrub's old team VeryGames. Titan placed 13-16th at ESL One Katowice 2015 in March.

=== Team EnVyUs ===
On July 20, 2015, Schrub and Dan "apEX" Madesclaire were traded to Team EnVyUs in exchange for Richard "shox" Papillon and Edouard "SmithZz" Dubourdeaux. The next month in August, EnVyUs placed second at the second Major, ESL One Cologne 2015. At the third and final Major of 2015, DreamHack Open Cluj-Napoca 2015, kennyS and EnVyUs won the tournament after beating Natus Vincere in the finals.

Although EnVyUs finished 13th – 16th at ESL One Cologne 2016, Schrub played well, finishing with a positive kill/death ratio in both maps. EnVyUs placed 1st in Global eSports Cup-Season 1, beginning the year well with a prize of $80,000. Later in the year, they placed 5-8th in ELEAGUE Season 1, winning a prize that totaled $1,000,000 considering the minor placing. In September, EnvyUS attended the GFINITY CS:GO INVITATIONAL, winning the tournament after defeating Mousesports in the final. Kenny attended ELEAGUE Major: Atlanta in January with EnVyUs where they placed 9th-12th place.

=== G2 Esports ===
On February 3, 2017, Schrub was revealed to be on a new roster under G2 eSports along with Nathan “NBK” Schmitt, Dan “apEX” Madesclaire, Richard “shox” Papillion, and Alexandre “bodyy” Pianaro. Edouard “SmithZz” Dubourdeaux was revealed to be their new coach. G2 eSports attended EPICENTER 2017 in October where they placed 3rd-4th after losing to Virtus.Pro in the semifinals. G2 won ESL Pro League Finals Season 5 and Dreamhack Masters Malmö 2017. Schrub received the MVP title in both events. G2 attended ELEAGUE Boston Major in January and finished 5th-8th after losing to Cloud9 in the quarterfinals.

== Achievements and awards ==
At The Game Awards 2015, Schrub won Esports Player of the Year.

Titan

- 13-16th — ESL One Katowice 2015
- 1st — Dreamhack Stockholm 2014
- 1st — Gamers Assembly 2015

Team EnVyUs

- 2nd — ESL One Cologne 2015
- 1st — IEM Gamescom 2015
- 1st — Dreamhack Open London 2015
- 1st — Gfinity Champion of Champions 2015
- 1st — DreamHack Open Cluj-Napoca 2015
- 1st — Game Show Global eSports Cup 2016
- 13th – 16th — ESL One Cologne 2016
- 5-8th — ELeague Season 1
- 1st — World Electronic Sports Games

G2 Esports

- 1st — DreamHack Tours 2017
- 1st — HTC 2vs2 Invitational by PGL
- 1st-2nd — DreamHack Open Austin 2017
- 1st — ESL Pro League Season 5
- 1st — DreamHack Masters Malmö 2017
