= N. D. G. James =

Noel David Glaves James, known as "Jimmy," (1912-1993) was an English author and historian of forestry. His works included:

- The Forester's Companion (1955)
- A Pictorial Guide to Bicton Gardens (1970)
- A History of English Forestry (1981)
- A Forestry Centenary: the history of the Royal Forestry Society of England, Wales, and Northern Ireland (1982)
- Plain Soldiering. A history of the armed forces on Salisbury Plain (1987)
- An Historical Dictionary of Forestry and Woodland Terms (1991)
