= Friberg (gamer) =

Swedish professional gamer

friberg
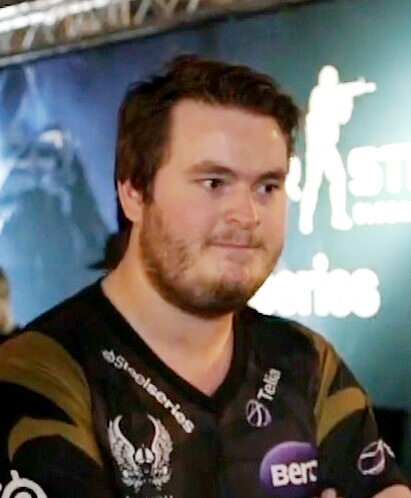
- Friberg during Dreamhack Winter 2013

Personal information
- Name: Adam Friberg
- Nationality: Swedish

Career information
- Games: Counter-Strike: Source; Counter-Strike: Global Offensive
- Playing career: 2010–2022
- Role: Entry fragger

Team history
- 2012–2017: Ninjas In Pyjamas
- 2017–2018: OpTic Gaming
- 2018–2019: Heroic
- 2020–2022: Dignitas

Career highlights and awards
- CS:GO Major champion (Cologne 2014); 2x HLTV Top 20 Player of the Year (2013-2014); HLTV Major MVP (Cologne 2014)

Adam Friberg is a Swedish former professional Counter-Strike: Global Offensive player who last played for Dignitas. He is the cousin of Erik Friberg, a footballer who previously played for Seattle Sounders FC. Friberg previously played for Ninjas in Pyjamas where he won his only CS:GO Major, ESL One Cologne 2014.

== Career ==
=== Counter-Strike ===
Friberg began his professional esports career in 2009 playing for Games4u.se in Counter-Strike: Source.

=== Counter-Strike: Global Offensive ===
After playing with several teams from 2010 to 2012, Friberg signed with Ninjas in Pyjamas (NiP). During his time with the team, he helped them go on a record 87-map win streak on LAN, and took home the Major trophy from ESL One Cologne 2014. On July 31, 2017, Friberg parted ways with the team.

In August 2017, Friberg signed with OpTic Gaming.

Friberg signed with team Heroic in May 2018. In his 18 months with the team, he won several tournaments, including the GG.Bet Sydney Invitational in March and TOYOTA Master CS:GO Bangkok in November 2018. In August 2019, he was released from the team.

In January 2020, Friberg, along with Patrik "f0rest" Lindberg, Richard "Xizt" Landström, Christopher "GeT_RiGhT" Alesund, was signed by Dignitas, reuniting with former NiP teammates, until the team was disbanded in 2022.

== Merchandise ==
In October 2015, NiP in co-operation with Alvesta Glass released an ice cream in Friberg's honor, called "King Of Banana", referring to his nickname as the "king" of a certain part on a CS:GO map (de_inferno) called "Banana".
