= Shox (gamer) =

French gamer

shox
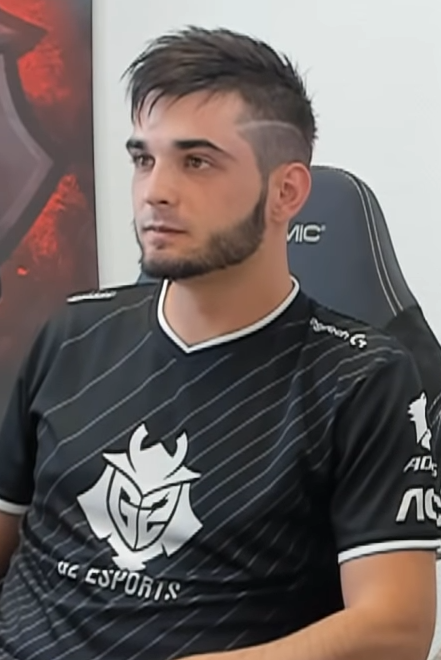
- shox in 2018

Personal information
- Name: Richard Papillon
- Nickname(s): shoxie, shoxieJESUS
- Born: 27 May 1992 (age 34)
- Nationality: French

Career information
- Game: Counter-Strike: Global Offensive
- Playing career: 2007–present

Team history
- 2014: Titan
- 2014–2015: Team LDLC
- 2015: Team EnVyUs
- 2015–2016: Titan
- 2016–2019: G2 Esports
- 2019–2021: Team Vitality
- 2021–2022: Team Liquid
- 2022–2023: Apeks
- 2023–2023: Nakama Esports

Career highlights and awards
- CS:GO Major champion (Jönköping 2014); 4× HLTV Top 20 Player of the Year (2013-2016); 4× HLTV MVP

Richard Papillon (born 27 May 1992), better known as shox, is a French professional Counter-Strike player. He is considered one of the greatest players in Counter-Strike: Global Offensive history, known for his high skill and longevity in the scene, and featured in HLTV's Top 20 Players list from 2013 to 2016. He has won over a dozen international tournaments, as well as one Major Championship: DreamHack Winter 2014.

== Early life ==
Shox began playing Counter-Strike when he was nine years old, and was introduced to the series by his older brother. His parents allowed him to take a year off from studies to pursue the game which led to him joining his first successful teams in Counter-Strike: Source around 2007. His handle referenced a model of Nike shoes that were popular at the time.

== Career ==
Shox is best known for playing for a number of French Counter-Strike teams, including VeryGames, Titan, Team LDLC, EnVyUs, G2, and Team Vitality. Shox began playing competitive Counter-Strike in 2006 but made his name in Counter-Strike: Source with French squads that dominated the game. Shox was a part of the VeryGames team that won ESWC 2011, his first Major. He rejoined VeryGames after Counter-Strike: Global Offensive was released, becoming the best player in the world in late 2013 and early 2014.

In 2021 he joined a non-French team for the first time, signing with Team Liquid. Just six months later, he was moved to the bench after disappointing results. He then signed with a Norwegian organization, Apeks, in August 2022.
