= Dupreeh =

Danish professional gamer

dupreeh
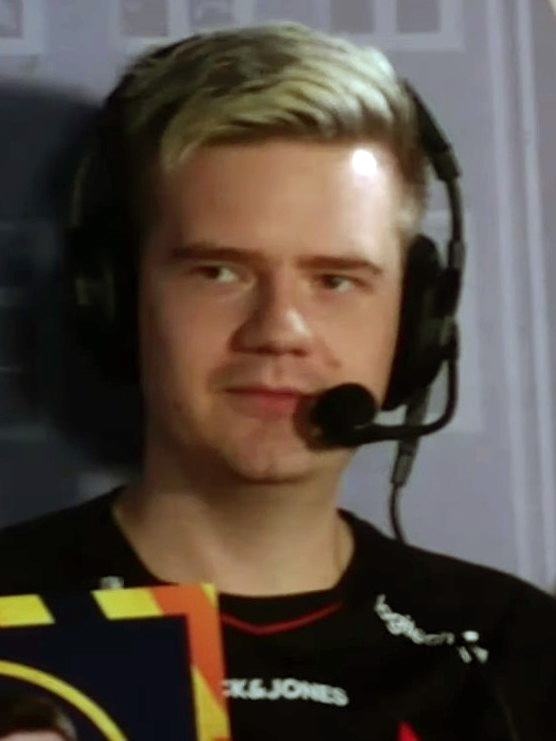
- Rasmussen in 2018

Personal information
- Name: Peter Rothmann Rasmussen
- Born: 26 March 1993 (age 33); Allerød, Denmark

Career information
- Game: Counter-Strike: Global Offensive; Counter-Strike 2
- Playing career: 2012–2025
- Role: Rifler

Team history
- 2012–2013: 3DMAX
- 2013: Copenhagen Wolves
- 2013–2014: über G33KZ
- 2014–2015: Team Dignitas
- 2015: Team SoloMid
- 2015–2021: Astralis (Note: Known as ? (Team Questionmark) from 2015 to 2016.)
- 2022–2023: Team Vitality
- 2023: Heroic
- 2023–2024: Preasy
- 2024–2025: Team Falcons

Career highlights and awards
- 5× CS:GO Major champion (Atlanta 2017, London 2018, Katowice 2019, Berlin 2019, Paris 2023); IEM Grand Slam champion (Season 1); 7× HLTV Top 20 Player of the Year (2013-2015, 2017-2020); 2× HLTV MVP

Peter Rothmann Rasmussen (born 26 March 1993), better known as dupreeh, is a Danish former professional Counter-Strike 2 player who most recently played for Team Falcons. He has played for Team Dignitas, Team SoloMid, Astralis, Team Vitality and Heroic. In 2023 with Team Vitality, he became the first and only player to win five majors in Counter-Strike: Global Offensive history, beating his own record of four majors (shared with three of his teammates) reached with Astralis in 2019. Rasmussen is the only player to have participated in every CS:GO Major.

He was sidelined during ESL One Cologne 2016 after developing appendicitis on 6 July 2016. Rasmussen left Astralis in December 2021, along with Emil "Magisk" Reif and coach Danny "zonic" Sørensen. All three joined Team Vitality in January 2022.

On 23 October 2023, Rasmussen signed to Heroic for the remainder of the year.

On 28 December 2023, Rasmussen signed to Danish team Preasy.

On 26 March 2024, Team Falcons announced the signing of Rasmussen. However, he was subsequently benched in November after Falcons had failed to qualify for the Perfect World Shanghai Major 2024.

On 22 June 2025, Rasmussen announced his retirement from professional Counter-Strike on the Grand Finals stage of the Blast Austin Major 2025.

Rasmussen decided to go down the route of game developing after his professional Counter-Strike career and became a minority partner and investor in Trinor Entertainment to create the game Skyward Masters. alongside Frederik Byskov who is one of the original founders of Astralis.
