= 2006 in esports =

This article lists the top four teams or players in each of the various eSports world championships of the 2006 season.

== Counter-Strike ==
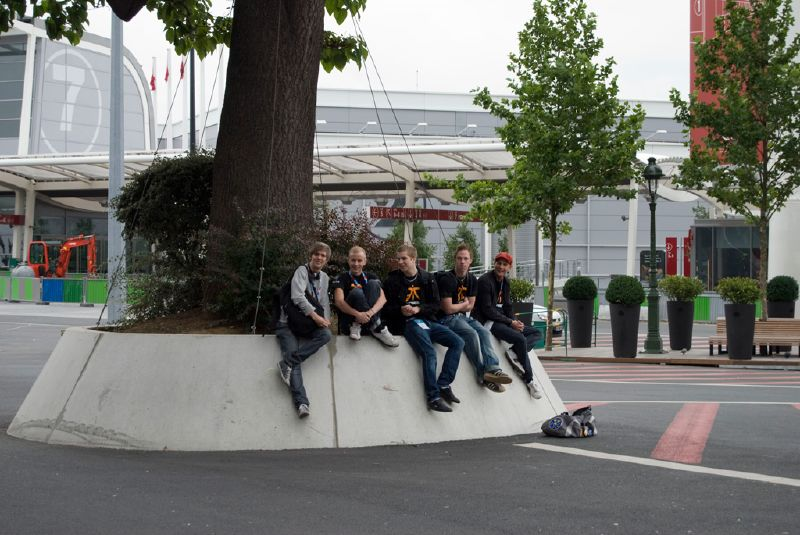
Fnatic, the Counter-Strike team that won the E-Sports Team of the Year Award in 2006. Showing from left: dsn, cArn, f0rest and Archi, as well as Oskar "ins" Holm. Tentpole left fnatic after the team's victory at CPL Winter 2006.

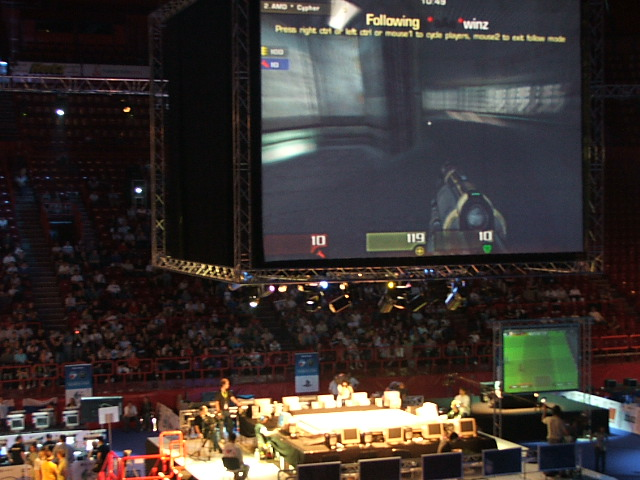
The 2006 Electronic Sports World Cup was held in the Bercy Arena in Paris.

Championship	1st place, gold medalist(s)	2nd place, silver medalist(s)	3rd place, bronze medalist(s)	4th
CPL 2006	(Australia) fnatic: (Sweden) Oscar "Archi" Torgersen; (Sweden) Patrik "cArn" Sättermon; (Sweden) Harley "dsn" Orwall; (Sweden) Patrik "f0rest" Lindberg; (Sweden) Kristoffer "Tentpole" Nordlund	(Denmark) MeetYourMakers: (Norway) Ola "elemeNt" Moum; (Norway) Lasse "Xione" Stokke; (Norway) Preben "prb" Gammelsæter; (Norway) Geir-Stian "juven9le" Svendsen; (Norway) Sondre "REAL" Svanevik	(Poland) Pentagram: (Poland) Łukasz "LUq" Wnek; (Poland) Mariusz "Loord" Cybulski; (Poland) Wiktor "TaZ" Wojtas; (Poland) Filip "Neo" Kubski; (Poland) Jakub "kuben" Gurczyński	(France) Against All Authority: (France) Guillaume "Geno" Ntep; (France) Marc "bisou" Naoum; (France) Steeve "Ozstrik3r" Flavigni; (Australia) Fergus "ferg" Stephenson; (France) David "Xp3" Garrido
WSVG 2006	(Germany) aTTaX: (Germany) David "CHEF-KOCH" Nagel; (Germany) Peter "Chucky" Schlosser; (Germany) Navid "Kapio" Javadi; (Germany) Jan "mooN" Stolle; (Germany) Roman "roman" Ausserdorfer	(United States) Team3D: (United States) Josh "Dominator" Sievers; (United States) Mikey "Method" So; (Canada) Griffin "shaGuar" Benger; (United States) Ron "Rambo" Kim; (United States) Salvatore "Volcano" Garozzo	(Australia) fnatic: (Sweden) Oscar "Archi" Torgersen; (Sweden) Patrik "cArn" Sättermon; (Sweden) Harley "dsn" Orwall; (Sweden) Patrik "f0rest" Lindberg; (Sweden) Kristoffer "Tentpole" Nordlund	(United States) Pandemic: (United States) Chad "Daffsta" White; (Canada) Garett "grt" Bambrough; (United States) Jonny "Ph33R" Schwan; (United States) Hoang "s0nNy" Tran; (United States) Mark "mastern00k" Torrez
World Cyber Games 2006	(Poland) Pentagram: (Poland) Łukasz "LUq" Wnek; (Poland) Mariusz "Loord" Cybulski; (Poland) Wiktor "TaZ" Wojtas; (Poland) Filip "Neo" Kubski; (Poland) Jakub "kuben" Gurczyński	(Sweden) Ninjas in Pyjamas: (Sweden) Dennis "walle" Wallenberg; (Sweden) Robert "RobbaN" Dahlstrom; (Sweden) Oskar "ins" Holm; (Sweden) Marcus "zet" Sundstrom; (Sweden) Abdisamad "SpawN" Mohamed	(Germany) hoorai: (Finland) Juuso "contE" Sajakoski; (Finland) Tomi "lurppis" Kovanen; (Finland) Niko "naSu" Kovanen; (Finland) Max "ruuit" Aspe; (Finland) Toni "toNppa" Luhtapuro	(Norway) Team NoA: (Denmark) Alexander "ave" Holdt; (Denmark) Brian "hpx" Christensen; (Denmark) Muhamed "mJe" Eid; (Denmark) Christian "Paddy" Juhl; (Denmark) Danny "zonic" Sørensen
ESWC 2006	Made in Brazil: (Brazil) Carlos Henrique "KIKOOOO" Segal; (Brazil) Renato "nak" Nakano; (Brazil) Raphael "cogu" Camargo; (Brazil) Lincoln "fnx" Lau; (Brazil) Bruno "bruno" Ono	(Australia) fnatic: (Sweden) Oscar "Archi" Torgersen; (Sweden) Patrik "cArn" Sättermon; (Sweden) Harley "dsn" Orwall; (Sweden) Patrik "f0rest" Lindberg; (Sweden) Kristoffer "Tentpole" Nordlund	(Germany) aTTaX: (Germany) David "CHEF-KOCH" Nagel; (Germany) Manuel "TiXo" Makohl; (Germany) Navid "Kapio" Javadi; (Germany) Jan "mooN" Stolle; (Germany) Tim "silver" Hochgrebe	(United States) Team 3D: (United States) Dave "moto" Geffon; (United States) Mikey "Method" So; (Canada) Griffin "shaGuar" Benger; (United States) Ron "Rambo" Kim; (United States) Salvatore "Volcano" Garozzo
KODE5 2006	(Sweden) Ninjas in Pyjamas: (Sweden) Dennis "walle" Wallenberg; (Sweden) Robert "RobbaN" Dahlstrom; (Sweden) Oskar "ins" Holm; (Sweden) Marcus "zet" Sundstrom; (Sweden) Abdisamad "SpawN" Mohamed	(China) wNv: (China) Chao "Aqi" Zhang; (China) Hao "bigun" Huo; (China) Ke Fei "Jungle" Yang; (China) Run Bo "sakula" Wu; (China) Zhen Wei "alex" Bian	(Germany) hoorai: (Finland) Juuso "contE" Sajakoski; (Finland) Tomi "lurppis" Kovanen; (Finland) Niko "naSu" Kovanen; (Finland) Max "ruuit" Aspe; (Finland) Toni "toNppa" Luhtapuro	Made in Brazil: (Brazil) Carlos Henrique "KIKOOOO" Segal; (Brazil) Renato "nak" Nakano; (Brazil) Rafael "pava" Pavanelli; (Brazil) Lincoln "fnx" Lau; (Brazil) Bruno "bruno" Ono
WEG Masters	(China) wNv: (China) Jiang "Mikk" Pu; (China) Minwoo Xing Ju "tK" Ma; (China) Ke Fei "Jungle" Yang; (China) Run Bo "sakula" Wu; (China) Zhen Wei "alex" Bian	(United States) Complexity: (United States) Matt "warden" Dickens; (United States) Tyler "Storm" Wood; (United States) Danny "fRoD" Mountainer; (United States) Corey "tr1p" Dodd; (United States) Justin "sunman" Summy	(China) Hacker.project: (South Korea) YoungHwan "ryu" Ryu; (South Korea) SunHo "termi" Pyun; (South Korea) JinHee "hee" Park; (South Korea) GeunChul "solo" Kang; (South Korea) SungJae "BaiL" Lee	(Norway) Catch-Gamer: (Norway) Jonas "bsl" Vikan; (Norway) Geir-Stian "juve9le" Svendsen; (Norway) Lars "Naikon" Olaisen; (Norway) Preben "OOPS" Josdal; (Norway) Sondre "REAL" Svanevik

== Quake 4 ==
Championship	1st place, gold medalist(s)	2nd place, silver medalist(s)	3rd place, bronze medalist(s)	4th
WSVG 2006	(Sweden) Johan "Toxic" Quick	(United States) Johnathan "Fatal1ty" Wendel	(United States) Jason "Socrates_" Sylka	(Russia) Anton "Cooller" Singov
WCG 2006	(Sweden) Johan "Toxic" Quick	(United States) Jason "Socrates_" Sylka	(Italy) Alessandro "Stermy" Avallone	(Sweden) Magnus "fox" Olsson
ESWC 2006	(France) Michael "winz" Bignet	(Belarus) Alexey "Cypher" Yanusheuski	(Netherlands) Ivo "Forever" Lindhout	(Russia) Anton "Cooller" Singov
KODE5 2006	(Sweden) Johan "Toxic" Quick	(Germany) Marcel "k1ller" Paul (Note: Singov, who was originally placed for the finals, failed to attend the final match and was therefore disqualified from the tournament. Paul was chosen to play in the finals against Quick as a replacement for Singov. Singov did not receive his award; instead, it was awarded to Bryant, who had been moved up to third place as a result. Avallone and Lindhout were moved up and tied for fourth place.)	(United States) Rafik "LoSt-CaUsE" Bryant	(Italy) Avallone / (Netherlands) Lindhout
QuakeCon 2006	(Sweden) Johan "Toxic" Quick	(Russia) Anton "Cooller" Singov	(Sweden) Alexander "Ztrider" Ingarv	(Poland) Maciej "av3k" Krzykowski

== Quake 3 ==
Championship	1st place, gold medalist(s)	2nd place, silver medalist(s)	3rd place, bronze medalist(s)	4th
CPL 2006	(United States) Paul "czm" Nelson	(China) Zhibo "Jibo" Fan	(Russia) Anton "Cooller" Singov	(Sweden) Alexander "Z4muZ" Ihrfohrs

== Warcraft III: The Frozen Throne ==
Championship	1st place, gold medalist(s)	2nd place, silver medalist(s)	3rd place, bronze medalist(s)	4th
WSVG 2006	(Netherlands) Manuel "Grubby" Schenkhuizen	(South Korea) Jung Hee "Sweet" Chun	(South Korea) Dae Hui "FoV" Cho	(United States) Dennis “Shortround" Chan
IEST 2006	(South Korea) Jang "Moon" Jae Ho	(China) Xiaofeng "Sky" Li	(South Korea) Jae Wook "Lucifer" Noh	(Bulgaria) Zdravko "Insomnia" Georgiev
WCG 2006	(China) Xiaofeng "Sky" Li	(France) Yoan "ToD" Merlo	(Ukraine) Mykhaylo "HoT" Novopashyn	(Russia) Mikhail "xyligan" Ryabkov
ESWC 2006	(South Korea) Jae Wook "Lucifer" Noh	(Croatia) Ivica "Zeus[19]" Markovic	(China) Xiaofeng "Sky" Li	(Bulgaria) Zdravko "Insomnia" Georgiev
KODE5 2006	(Russia) Andrey "Deadman" Sobolev	(France) Yoan "ToD" Merlo	(Netherlands) Manuel "Grubby" Schenkhuizen	(South Korea) Dae Hui "FoV" Cho
PGL	(China) Xiaofeng "Sky" Li	(China) Weiliang "Fly100%" Lu	(South Korea) Dae Hui "FoV" Cho	(South Korea) Lee "Check" Hyung Joo
WEF 2006	(Netherlands) Manuel "Grubby" Schenkhuizen	(France) Yoan "ToD" Merlo	(China) Hao "suhO" Su	(Sweden) Kim "SaSe" Hammar
WEG Masters	(France) Yoan "ToD" Merlo	(Netherlands) Manuel "Grubby" Schenkhuizen	(China) Xiaofeng "Sky" Li	(South Korea) Jang "Moon" Jae Ho
BWI 2006	(South Korea) Jung Hee "Sweet" Chun	(Netherlands) Manuel "Grubby" Schenkhuizen	(South Korea) Daeho 'Showtime' Kim	(South Korea) Hong "FarSeer" Won

== Warcraft III: The Frozen Throne – Team Events ==
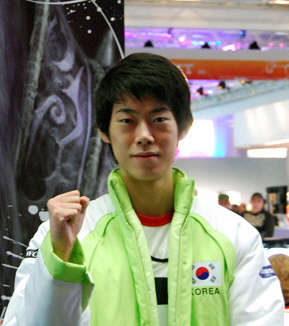
Warcraft III player Jang "Moon" Jae-ho, who fell in a short slump in 2005, returned "stronger than ever" in 2006.

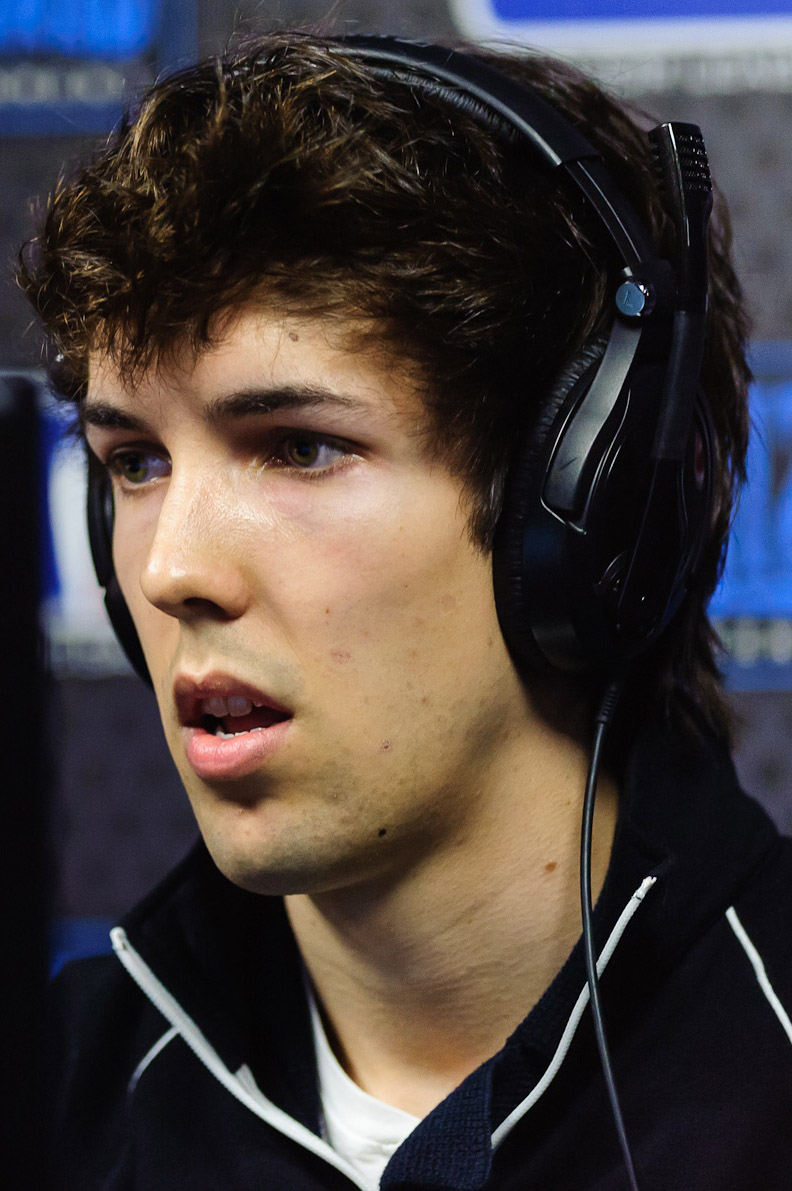
"Grubby" Schenkhuisen won the Gosu Gamer of the Year award in 2006 for his "superior gaming technique, good manners and display [of] great sportsmanship."

Championship	1st place, gold medalist(s)	2nd place, silver medalist(s)	3rd place, bronze medalist(s)	4th
WC3L Season IX	(Denmark) MeetYourMakers: (South Korea) Jung-Ki "Susiria" Oh; (South Korea) JaeWook "Lucifer" Noh; (South Korea) Jang "Moon" Jae Ho; (South Korea) Kim "Storm" JaeWoong	(United Kingdom) Four Kings: (Netherlands) Manuel "Grubby" Schenkhuizen; (France) Yoan "ToD" Merlo; (South Korea) Dae Hui "FoV" Cho; (Norway) Olav "Creolophus" Undheim; (Sweden) Sebastian "FuRy" Pesic; (Croatia) Ivica "Zeus[19] " Markovic	(Germany) SK Gaming: (Russia) Andrey "Deadman" Sobolev; (Bulgaria) Zdravko "Insomnia" Georgiev; (Ukraine) Mykhaylo "HoT" Novopashyn; (South Korea) Tae min "Zacard" Hwang	(China) World Elite: (South Korea) Sung "ReMinD" Sik Kim; (China) Xiaofeng "Sky" Li; (South Korea) Lee "Check" Hyung Joo; (China) Hao "suhO" Su; (South Korea) Lee Sung "SoJu" Duk
NGL One season I	(Denmark) MeetYourMakers: (South Korea) Jung-Ki "Susiria" Oh; (South Korea) JaeWook "Lucifer" Noh; (South Korea) Jang "Moon" Jae Ho; (South Korea) Jin Sung "BerA" Lee	(Germany) SK Gaming: (Russia) Andrey "Deadman" Sobolev; (Bulgaria) Zdravko "Insomnia" Georgiev; (South Korea) Jung Hee "Sweet" Chun; (South Korea) Tae min "Zacard" Hwang	(United Kingdom) Four Kings: (Netherlands) Manuel "Grubby" Schenkhuizen; (France) Yoan "ToD" Merlo; (South Korea) Dae Hui "FoV" Cho; (Norway) Olav "Creolophus" Undheim; (Croatia) Ivica "Zeus[19] " Markovic	(Germany) Mousesports: (Germany) Minh “Spell” Nguyen; (Germany) Dennis "HasuObs" Schneider; (Sweden) Kim "SaSe" Hammar; (Czech Republic) Michael "Giacomo" Hladik
Stars War III	Team China: (China) Xiaofeng "Sky" Li; (China) Su "suhO" Hao; (China) Weiliang "Fly100%" Lu; (China) Hongliang "xTiGer" Liu; (China) Zhengkun "Guangmo" Guo	(European Union) Team Europe: (Netherlands) Manuel "Grubby" Schenkhuizen; (France) Yoan "ToD" Merlo; (Bulgaria) Zdravko "Insomnia" Georgiev; (Bulgaria) Dimitar "DIDI8" Aleksandrov; (Norway) Olav "Creolophus" Undheim	(South Korea) Team Korea: (South Korea) Lee "Check" Hyung Joo; (South Korea) Rainbow; (South Korea) Seo Woo "ReiGn" Kang; (South Korea) Jung Hee "Sweet" Chun; (South Korea) Park "Lyn" Jun	
Stars War II	(South Korea) Team Korea: (South Korea) Dae Hui "FoV" Cho; (South Korea) JaeWook "Lucifer" Noh; (South Korea) Jang "Moon" Jae Ho; (South Korea) Jung Hee "Sweet" Chun; (South Korea) Tae min "Zacard" Hwang	Team China: (China) Xiaofeng "Sky" Li; (China) Hao "suhO" Su; (China) Liwei "XiaOt" Sun; (China) QcH[ATi]Gstar; (China) Zhengkun "Guangmo" Guo	(European Union) Team Europe: (Netherlands) Manuel "Grubby" Schenkhuizen; (France) Yoan "ToD" Merlo; (Bulgaria) Zdravko "Insomnia" Georgiev; (Sweden) Kim "SaSe" Hammar; (Ukraine) Mykhaylo "HoT" Novopashyn	

Championship	1st place, gold medalist(s)	2nd place, silver medalist(s)	3rd place, bronze medalist(s)	4th
WCG 2006	(United States) Wesley "ch0mpr" Cwiklo	(Sweden) Christopher "McLaren_F1" Hogfeldt	(Finland) Erno "FinPro" Kuronen	(France) Philippe "YggdrasiL" Vaillant

== Need for Speed: Most Wanted ==
Championship	1st place, gold medalist(s)	2nd place, silver medalist(s)	3rd place, bronze medalist(s)	4th
WCG 2006	(Russia) Alan "Alan" Enileev	(Russia) Nikolay "MrRASER" Frontov	(Netherlands) Steffan "Steffan" Amende	(Brazil) Rodrigo "Speed" Nunes

== See also ==
- World Cyber Games 2006
- 2006 CPL World Season
