= TaZ =

Polish professional Counter-Strike 2 coach

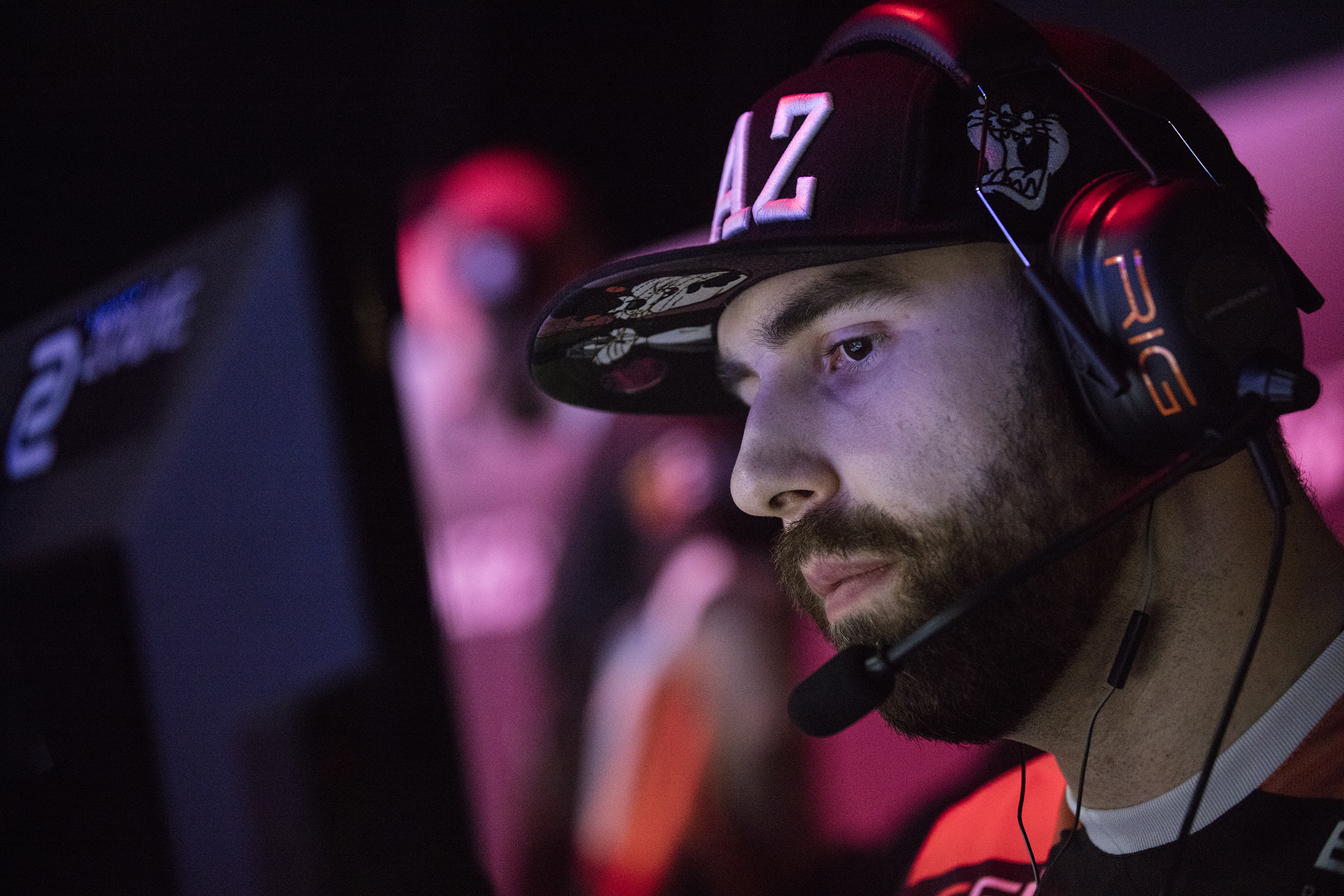

Personal information
- Name: Wiktor Wojtas
- Born: 6 June 1986 (age 40)
- Nationality: Polish

Career information
- Games: Counter-Strike 1.6; Counter-Strike: Global Offensive; Counter-Strike 2
- Playing career: 2004–2023
- Role: Coach
- Coaching career: 2023–present

Team history
- 2004–2007: Pentagram G-Shock
- 2007–2009: MeetYourMakers
- 2009: Wicked eSports
- 2009: Vitriolic
- 2009–2010: AGAiN
- 2010–2011: Frag eXecutors
- 2011: AGAiN
- 2011–2013: ESC Gaming
- 2013: Universal Soldiers
- 2013–2014: AGAiN
- 2014–2018: Virtus.pro
- 2018–2019: Kinguin
- 2019: devils.one
- 2019: Aristocracy
- 2019–2020: ARCY
- 2020–2023: Honoris

As coach:
- 2023–2025: G2 Esports

Career highlights and awards
- CS:GO Major champion (Katowice 2014)

Wiktor Wojtas, better known as TaZ, is a Polish Counter-Strike 2 coach and former Counter-Strike and Counter-Strike: Global Offensive player, who is currently the head coach for BC.game Esports. He is one of the "Golden Five" group of Polish CS players who won many tournaments with a number of different esports teams. He has played for Virtus.pro, AGAiN, Universal Soldiers, ESC Gaming, Frag eXecutors, Vitriolic, Wicked eSports, Meet Your Makers, and Pentagram G-Shock. Wojtas has been playing professionally since 2004.

TaZ and Virtus.pro won EMS One Katowice 2014, which was the first major to be held in Poland. They defeated Ninjas in Pyjamas 2–0 in the grand final. Over the years, TaZ and co. would rack up many tournament wins, giving them the nickname of "Virtus plow", and they became known for their ability to chain rounds together against their opponents in a momentum-driven playstyle. TaZ is considered one of the greatest Polish players to play Counter-Strike, alongside NEO, pasha, Loord, and LUq. TaZ and Virtus.pro won ELeague Season 1 over fnatic in the finals on July 30, 2016, ending the slump Virtus pro had been in. This would be one of the final victories VP would enjoy, and the roster which had held together since late 2013 disbanded in early 2018. As of October 2016, TaZ had won $476,809, the largest single prize being $80,000 from winning ELeague Season 1.

On December 11, 2023, TaZ began coaching Counter-Strike and was unveiled as G2 Esports new coach.

== Tournament results ==
Bold denotes a CS:GO Major

=== Pentagram ===
- 1st — 2006 Cyberathlete Professional League Championship Finals

=== PGS Gaming ===
- 1st — World Cyber Games 2006

=== AGAiN ===
- 1st — World Cyber Games 2009

=== Frag-Executors ===
- 3rd — World Cyber Games 2010

=== PGS Gaming ===
- 1st — World Cyber Games 2011

=== Universal Soldiers ===
- 9th-12th — **DreamHack Winter 2013**

=== Virtus.pro ===
- 1st — **EMS One Katowice 2014**
- 3–4th — **DreamHack Winter 2014**
- 3-4th — **ESL One Katowice 2015**
- 3-4th — **ESL One Cologne 2015**
- 5-8th — **DreamHack Open Cluj-Napoca 2015**
- 5-8th — Intel Extreme Masters Season X – World Championship
- 5-8th — **MLG Major Championship: Columbus**
- 3–4th — **ESL One Cologne 2016**
- 1st — ELeague Season 1
- 1st — DreamHack ZOWIE Open Bucharest 2016
- 3rd — WESG 2016 World Finals
- 2nd — **ELEAGUE Major 2017**
- 1st — DreamHack Masters Las Vegas 2017
- 7-8th — Intel Extreme Masters Season XI - World Championship
