= 2006 Cyberathlete Professional League World Season =

The 2006 CPL World Season was a series of electronic sports competitions organized by the Cyberathlete Professional League in the fall of 2006. It was a follow-up of the 2005 CPL World Tour and was announced by the CPL on July 1, 2006.

The tour featured two games, Counter-Strike and Quake 3. After a total of seven qualifier events, the finals were held on 16–20 December 2006 at the Hyatt Regency hotel in Dallas, Texas. The championship finals had a total prize purse of $150,000 and were won by fnatic (Counter-Strike) and Paul "czm" Nelson (Quake 3).

== Results ==
=== Counter-Strike ===
Championship Finals	Gold	Silver	Bronze	4th
(United States) Dallas	(Sweden) fnatic (Sweden) Oscar "Archi" Torgersen (Sweden) Patrik "cArn" Sättermon (Sweden) Harley "dsn" Orwall (Sweden) Patrik "f0rest" Lindberg (Sweden) Kristoffer "Tentpole" Nordlund	(Denmark) MeetYourMakers (Norway) Ola "elemeNt" Moum (Norway) Lasse "Xione" Stokke (Norway) Preben "prb" Gammelsæter (Norway) Geir-Stian "juven9le" Svendsen (Norway) Sondre "REAL" Svanevik	(Poland) Pentagram (Poland) Lukasz "LUq" Wnek (Poland) Mariusz "Loord" Cybulski (Poland) Wiktor "TaZ" Wojtas (Poland) Filip "Neo" Kubski (Poland) Jakub "kuben" Gurczynski	(France) Against All Authority (France) Guillaume "Geno" Ntep (France) Marc "bisou" Naoum (France) Steeve "Ozstrik3r" Flavigni (Australia) Fergus "ferg" Stephenson (France) David "Xp3" Garrido
Season Stop	Gold	Silver	Bronze	4th
Nordic	(Sweden) Ninjas in Pyjamas	(Netherlands) H2k-Gaming	(Finland) 69°N-28°E	(Norway) Fainted
South Korea	(South Korea) Lavega Gaming	(South Korea) Project_kr	(South Korea) gehenna	(South Korea) Series of Win
China	(China) Star.ex	(China) Hacker.Gaming	(China) wNv Gaming	(China) TR
Italy	(France) Against All Authority	(Germany) A-Losers	(France) Goodgame	(Germany) TBH.e-Sports
Brazil	(Brazil) g3nerationX	Made in Brazil	(Brazil) Team Bye	(Brazil) GameCrashers
Singapore	(Sweden) fnatic	(Germany) Team Speed-Link	(Malaysia) Team Hybrid	(China) Hacker.Gaming

=== Quake III ===
Championship Finals	Gold	Silver	Bronze	4th
(United States) Dallas	(United States) Paul "czm" Nelson	(China) Zhibo "Jibo" Fan	(Russia) Anton "Cooller" Singov	(Sweden) Alexander "Z4muZ" Ihrfohrs
Season Stop	Gold	Silver	Bronze	4th
Nordic	(China) Zhibo "Jibo" Fan	(Sweden) Sebastian "Spart1e" Siira	(Sweden) Alexander "ZamuZ" Ihrfors	(Poland) Maciej "zik" Jaku
Australia	(Australia) Andrew "Python" Chacha	(Australia) Peter "Ventz" Kidson	(Australia) Sean "Hotw1rd" Dalton	(Australia) Robert "Kiddie" Kidson
Italy	(Sweden) Magnus "fojji" Olsson	(Germany) Marcel "k1ller" Paul	(China) Zhibo "Jibo" Fan	(Russia) Alexey "apo5tol" Altshuller
Brazil	(Brazil) Daniel "Ryu" Souza De Lima	(Brazil) Diogo "met" Fressato	(Brazil) Vitor "apo" Proto	(Brazil) Rodrigo "agu" Lima Wanderley
Singapore	(China) Zhibo "Jibo" Fan	(United States) Brian "DKT" Flanders	(Australia) Andrew "Python" Chacha	(China) Meng "RocketBoy" Yang

== World Season events ==
=== Singapore ===
- Location: Singapore
- Date: September 15–17, 2006
- Games: Counter-Strike, Quake 3
- Winners: (Sweden) fnatic, (China) Fan "Jibo" Zhibo

=== Brazil ===
- Location: São Paulo
- Date: November 15–19, 2006
- Games: Counter-Strike, Quake 3
- Winners: (Brazil) g3nerationX, (Brazil) Daniel "Ryu" Souza De Lima

=== Italy ===
- Location: Verona
- Date: November 24–26, 2006
- Games: Counter-Strike, Quake 3
- Winners: (France) Against All Authority, (Sweden) Magnus "fojji" Olsson

=== Australia ===
- Location: Perth
- Date: November 25–26, 2006
- Games: Quake 3
- Winner: (Australia) Andrew "Python" Chacha

=== China ===
- Location: Chengdu
- Date: November 25–26, 2006
- Games: Counter-Strike
- Winners: (China) Star.ex

=== South Korea ===
- Location: Seoul
- Date: November 27, 2006
- Games: Counter-Strike
- Winners: (South Korea) Lavega Gaming

=== Nordic ===
- Location: Jönköping
- Date: November 30 - December 3, 2006
- Games: Counter-Strike, Quake 3
- Winners: (Sweden) Ninjas in Pyjamas, (China) Fan "Jibo" Zhibo

=== Championship finals ===
- Location: Dallas
- Date: December 16–20, 2006
- Games: Counter-Strike, Quake 3
- Winners: (Sweden) fnatic, (United States) Paul "czm" Nelson
