= DreamHack Winter 2013 =

Counter-Strike: Global Offensive championship

- 2013
- The DreamHack Winter 2013 logo

Tournament information
- Sport: Counter-Strike: Global Offensive
- Location: Jönköping, Sweden
- Dates: 28 November 2013–30 November 2013
- Administrator: Valve; DreamHack
- Tournament format(s): 16 team group stage Eight team single-elimination playoff
- Venue: Elmia Exhibition and Convention Centre
- Teams: 16 teams
- Purse: $250,000 USD

Final positions
- Champions: Fnatic (1st title)
- 1st runners-up: Ninjas in Pyjamas
- 2nd runners-up: compLexity Gaming; VeryGames
- MVP: Jesper "JW" Wecksell

The 2013 DreamHack SteelSeries Counter Strike: Global Offensive Championship, also known as DreamHack Winter 2013, was the first Counter-Strike: Global Offensive Major Championship. The tournament was organized by DreamHack and sponsored by Valve. The competition was held during the Winter 2013 DreamHack digital festival at the Elmia Exhibition and Convention Centre in Jönköping, Sweden. Six invitees joined ten qualifiers to form the sixteen team event. Community funding helped to build the US$250,000 prize pool. The tournament had a peak 145,000 concurrent viewers on Twitch and the in-game viewing client.

== Format ==
Six teams – Astana Dragons, compLexity Gaming, VeryGames, Clan-Mystik, Fnatic, and Team iBuyPower – were directly invited to participate in the tournament.

In addition to those six teams, ten other teams qualified through other tournaments. For instance, Ninjas in Pyjamas qualified by winning the DreamHack Summer 2013 tournament; Copenhagen Wolves qualified by winning EMS One Fall 2013; LGB eSports qualified through an online qualifier; and Reason Gaming qualified through the BYOC qualifier.

Teams were split up into four groups, and all group matches were best-of-ones. The highest seed would play the lowest seed in each group and the second and third seeds would play against each other. The winner of those two matches would play each other to determine which team moved on to the playoff stage, while the losers of the first round of matches also played. The loser of the lower match was then eliminated from the tournament. With one team advanced and one eliminated, the two remaining teams would play an elimination match for the second playoff spot. This format is known as the GSL format, named for the Global StarCraft II League.

The playoff bracket consisted of eight teams, two from each group. All of these matches were best-of-three, single elimination. Teams advanced in the bracket until a final winner was decided, and the eight teams to make the playoff bracket earned automatic invitations to the next Major, EMS One Katowice 2014.

=== Map pool ===
There were five maps to choose from. In the group stage, each team bans two maps so that one remains. In the playoffs, each team bans one map and chooses one map; the remaining map would be the decider map of the series.

Maps

- Dust II
- Inferno
- Mirage
- Nuke
- Train

== Broadcast talent ==
Hosts

- Scott "SirScoots" Smith
- Jonas "bsl" Vikan

Commentators

- Corey "dunN" Dunn
- Tomi "lurppis" Kovanen
- Stuart "TosspoT" Saw

Analyst

- Duncan "Thorin" Shields"

== Teams ==
Direct invitation

- Astana Dragons
- Clan-Mystik
- compLexity Gaming
- Fnatic
- iBUYPOWER
- VeryGames

Qualifiers

- Copenhagen Wolves (Note: 3rd–4th place at EMS One Fall 2013)
- LGB eSports (Note: DreamHack Winter 2013 Online Qualifiers winners)
- Natus Vincere (Note: 3rd place at TECHLABS Cup 2013 Finals)
- Ninjas in Pyjamas (Note: 1st place at DreamHack Summer 2013)
- n!faculty (Note: 1st place at DreamHack Valencia 2013)

- Reason Gaming (Note: DreamHack Winter 2013 BYOC Qualifier winners)
- Recursive eSports
- SK Gaming (Note: 2nd place at DreamHack Bucharest 2013)
- Universal Soldiers
- Xapso

== Group stage ==
=== Group A ===
Pos	Team	W	L	RF	RA	RD	Pts
1	Fnatic	2	0	32	15	+17	6
2	LGB eSports	2	1	46	31	+15	6
3	Clan-Mystik	1	2	24	46	−22	3
4	Natus Vincere	0	2	22	32	−10	0

Opening matches

28 November 2013; 10:54 CET (UTC+1)	Fnatic	16–9; Mirage	Natus Vincere

28 November 2013; 11:00 CET (UTC+1)	Clan-Mystik	16–14; Dust II	LGB eSports

Elimination match

28 November 2013; 12:04 CET (UTC+1)	LGB Esports	16–13; Mirage	Natus Vincere

Winners' match

28 November 2013; 12:18 CET (UTC+1)	Clan-Mystik	6–16; Inferno	Fnatic

Decider match

28 November 2013; 13:15 CET (UTC+1)	Clan-Mystik	2–16; Inferno	LGB eSports

=== Group B ===
Pos	Team	W	L	RF	RA	RD	Pts
1	Ninjas in Pyjamas	2	0	32	17	+15	6
2	Recursive eSports	2	1	45	37	+8	6
3	Universal Soldiers	1	2	33	41	−8	3
4	iBUYPOWER	0	2	17	32	−15	0

Opening matches

28 November 2013; 15:23 CET (UTC+1)	Ninjas in Pyjamas	16–13; Inferno	Recursive eSports

28 November 2013; 15:33 CET (UTC+1)	iBUYPOWER	9–16; Dust II	Universal Soldiers

Elimination match

28 November 2013; 16:38 CET (UTC+1)	iBUYPOWER	8–16; Inferno	Recursive eSports

Winners' match

28 November 2013; 18:20 CET (UTC+1)	Ninjas in Pyjamas	16–4; Inferno	Universal Soldiers

Decider match

28 November 2013; 19:58 CET (UTC+1)	Universal Soldiers	13–16; Inferno	Recursive eSports

=== Group C ===
Pos	Team	W	L	RF	RA	RD	Pts
1	compLexity Gaming	2	0	32	19	+13	6
2	VeryGames	2	1	46	33	+13	6
3	n!faculty	1	2	30	37	−7	3
4	Xapso	0	2	13	32	−19	0

Opening matches

29 November 2013; 09:43 CET (UTC+1)	n!faculty	5–16; Inferno	compLexity Gaming

29 November 2013; 09:45 CET (UTC+1)	VeryGames	16–8; Inferno	Xapso

Winners' match

29 November 2013; 11:07 CET (UTC+1)	compLexity Gaming	16–14; Inferno	VeryGames

Elimination match

29 November 2013; 11:20 CET (UTC+1)	n!faculty	16–5; Train	Xapso

Decider match

29 November 2013; 12:39 CET (UTC+1)	n!faculty	9–16; Dust II	VeryGames

=== Group D ===
Pos	Team	W	L	RF	RA	RD	Pts
1	Copenhagen Wolves	2	0	32	18	+14	6
2	Astana Dragons	2	1	39	40	−1	6
3	Reason Gaming	1	2	40	32	+8	3
4	SK Gaming	0	2	14	32	−18	0

Opening matches

29 November 2013; 15:03 CET (UTC+1)	Copenhagen Wolves	16–11; Inferno	SK Gaming

29 November 2013; 15:06 CET (UTC+1)	Astana Dragons	16–11; Inferno	Reason Gaming

Winners' match

29 November 2013; 16:15 CET (UTC+1)	Astana Dragons	7–16; Nuke	Copenhagen Wolves

Elimination match

29 November 2013; 16:21 CET (UTC+1)	SK Gaming	3–16; Inferno	Reason Gaming

Decider match

29 November 2013; 17:30 CET (UTC+1)	Astana Dragons	16–13; Nuke	Reason Gaming

== Playoffs ==
=== Bracket ===
Quarter-finals
28 November 2013
LGB eSports	1
Ninjas in Pyjamas	2
29 November 2013
Copenhagen Wolves	1
VeryGames	2
28 November 2013
Fnatic	2
Recursive eSports	1
29 November 2013
compLexity Gaming	2
Astana Dragons	1

Semi-finals
30 November 2013
Ninjas in Pyjamas	2
VeryGames	1
30 November 2013
Fnatic	2
compLexity Gaming	0

Final
30 November 2013
Ninjas in Pyjamas	1
Fnatic	2

=== Quarterfinals ===
28 November 2013; 22:29 CET (UTC+1)	LGB eSports	16–14; Dust II	Ninjas in Pyjamas

28 November 2013; 23:41 CET (UTC+1)	LGB eSports	9–16; Train	Ninjas in Pyjamas

29 November 2013; 00:34 CET (UTC+1)	LGB eSports	7–16; Mirage	Ninjas in Pyjamas

Ninjas in Pyjamas won series 2–1

29 November 2013; 20:00 CET (UTC+1)	Copenhagen Wolves	6–16; Dust II	VeryGames

29 November 2013; 20:49 CET (UTC+1)	Copenhagen Wolves	16–5; Inferno	VeryGames

29 November 2013; 21:42 CET (UTC+1)	Copenhagen Wolves	12–16; Mirage	VeryGames

VeryGames won series 2–1

28 November 2013; 22:21 CET (UTC+1)	Fnatic	16–9; Inferno	Recursive eSports

28 November 2013; 23:10 CET (UTC+1)	Fnatic	13–16; Dust II	Recursive eSports

29 November 2013; 00:11 CET (UTC+1)	Fnatic	16–10; Train	Recursive eSports

Fnatic won series 2–1

29 November 2013; 19:58 CET (UTC+1)	compLextity Gaming	9–16; Nuke	Astana Dragons

29 November 2013; 20:36 CET (UTC+1)	compLextity Gaming	16–7; Dust II	Astana Dragons

29 November 2013; 21:47 CET (UTC+1)	compLextity Gaming	16–12; Inferno	Astana Dragons

compLextity Gaming won series 2–1

=== Semifinals ===
30 November 2013; 14:17 CET (UTC+1)	Ninjas in Pyjamas	16–13; Dust II	VeryGames

30 November 2013; 15:45 CET (UTC+1)	Ninjas in Pyjamas	6–16; Inferno	VeryGames

30 November 2013; 16:35 CET (UTC+1)	Ninjas in Pyjamas	16–5; Nuke	VeryGames

Ninjas in Pyjamas won series 2–1

30 November 2013; 17:56 CET (UTC+1)	Fnatic	16–7; Train	compLexity Gaming

30 November 2013; 18:54 CET (UTC+1)	Fnatic	16–7; Mirage	compLexity Gaming

Fnatic won series 2–0

=== Finals ===
30 November 2013; 22:47 CET (UTC+1)	Ninjas in Pyjamas	14–16; Dust II	Fnatic

30 November 2013; 23:45 CET (UTC+1)	Ninjas in Pyjamas	16–6; Inferno	Fnatic

1 December 2013; 00:49 CET (UTC+1)	Ninjas in Pyjamas	2–16; Train	Fnatic

Fnatic won series 2–1

== Final standings ==
Place	Team	Prize Money	Seed for EMS One Katowice 2014	Roster	Coach
1st	Fnatic	US$100,000	Legends status	Devilwalk, JW, flusha, pronax, schneider	cArn
2nd	Ninjas in Pyjamas	US$50,000	Legends status	f0rest, GeT RiGhT, Xizt, friberg, Fifflaren	–
3rd–4th	compLexity Gaming	US$22,000	Legends status	Hiko, n0thing, swag, sgares, Semphis	–
3rd–4th	VeryGames	US$22,000	Legends status	shox, SmithZz, NBK, ScreaM, Ex6TenZ	–
5–8th	LGB eSports	US$10,000	Legends status	dennis, olofmeister, KRiMZ, eksem, SKYTTEN	–
5–8th	Astana Dragons	US$10,000	Legends status	kucher, Dosia, ANGE1, markeloff, AdreN	–
5–8th	Recursive eSports	US$10,000	Legends status	Uzzziii, Happy, GMX, kennyS, Maniac	–
5–8th	Copenhagen Wolves	US$10,000	Legends status	FeTiSh, dev1ce, Nico, dupreeh, Xyp9x	3k2
9–12th	Clan-Mystik	US$2,000	–	apEX, HaRts, KQLY, ioRek, kioShiMa	–
9–12th	Universal Soldiers	US$2,000	–	TaZ, NEO, pashaBiceps, byali, Snax	–
9–12th	n!faculty	US$2,000	–	karrigan, gla1ve, Pimp, cajunb, raalz	–
9–12th	Reason Gaming	US$2,000	–	coloN, MSL, smF, EXR, LOMME	–
13–16th	SK Gaming	US$2,000	–	MODDII, twist, xelos, Delpan, pita	–
13–16th	Xapso	US$2,000	–	ultra, centeks, cadiaN, aizy, robiin	–
13–16th	Team iBUYPOWER	US$2,000	–	Skadoodle, adreN, DaZeD, anger, AZK	–
13–16th	Natus Vincere	US$2,000	–	ceh9, Zeus, starix, seized, kibaken	–
