= EMS One Katowice 2014 =

Counter-Strike video game championship

- 2014
- The EMS One Katowice 2014 logo

Tournament information
- Sport: Counter-Strike: Global Offensive
- Location: Katowice, Poland
- Dates: March 13, 2014–March 16, 2014
- Administrator: Valve; ESL
- Tournament format(s): 16 team round-robin group stage Eight team single-elimination playoff
- Venue: Spodek Arena
- Teams: 16 teams
- Purse: $250,000 USD

Final positions
- Champions: Virtus.pro
- 1st runners-up: Ninjas in Pyjamas
- 2nd runners-up: Team Dignitas; LGB eSports
- MVP: Jarosław "pashaBiceps" Jarząbkowski

Electronic Sports League Major Series One Katowice 2014, also known as EMS One Katowice 2014, was the second Counter-Strike: Global Offensive Major Championship. The tournament was held from March 13–16, 2014 at the Spodek Arena in Katowice, Silesian Voivodeship, Poland. It was organized by Electronic Sports League and sponsored by the game's developers Valve. The tournament had a total prize pool of US$250,000. The Polish roster of Virtus.pro won the event by beating Ninjas in Pyjamas in the finals. EMS One Katowice 2014 was streamed on Twitch and had a peak of over 250,000 concurrent viewers.

== Format ==
The top eight teams from Dreamhack Winter 2013 qualified as Legends. Two teams were directly invited to participate in the tournament, while the remaining six teams qualified through an online qualifier that consisted of sixteen teams.

Teams were split up into four groups, and all group matches were best-of-ones. The highest seed would play the lowest seed in each group and the second and third seeds would play against each other. The winner of those two matches would play each other to determine which team moved on to the playoff stage, while the losers of the first round of matches also played. The loser of the lower match was then eliminated from the tournament. With one team advanced and one eliminated, the two remaining teams would play an elimination match for the second playoff spot. This format is known as the GSL format, named for the Global StarCraft II League.

The playoffs bracket consisted of eight teams, two from each group. All of these matches were best-of-three, single elimination. Teams advanced in the bracket until a winner was decided.

=== Map Pool ===
There were five maps to choose from: Dust II, Inferno, Mirage, Nuke, and Train. In the group stage, each team banned two maps and the match was played on the remaining map. In the playoffs, each team banned one map and chose one map; the remaining map would be the decider map of the best-of-three series, if needed.

== Main Qualifier ==
Only teams from Europe competed in the main qualifier tournament. One team from the Nordic region, one team from France, one from the United Kingdom, one from Germany, two from the CIS region, and two from Poland played in their respective regional qualifiers to qualify for the main qualifier. In addition, four teams each advanced from two general European qualifiers to the main qualifier.

The main qualifier was a 16 team, best of three, double elimination bracket. A total of six teams advanced to the Major. Team iBUYPOWER from the United States and Vox Eminor from Australia did not have to play in any qualifier and were invited to play in the Major.

=== Teams Competing ===
Regional Qualifiers

- 3DMAX (Nordic)
- Clan-Mystic (France)
- hudzGs TEAM (UK)
- mousesports (Germany)
- Natus Vincere (CIS)
- USSR Team (CIS)
- Meet Your Makers (Poland)
- Virtus.pro (Poland)

Europe Qualifiers

- oFF Balance Gaming (Europe 1)
- To Be Announced (Europe 1)
- Team Alternate (Europe 1)
- Reason Gaming (Europe 1)
- GreyFaceNoSpace (Europe 2)
- H2k Gaming (Europe 2)
- partyastronauts (Europe 2)
- Wizards e-Sports Club (Europe 2)

=== Bracket ===
Winner's Bracket

Round 1
Virtus.pro	2
GreyFaceNoSpace	0
Team Alternate	2
USSR Team	1
3DMAX	2
oFF Balance Gaming	0
Wizards e-Sports Club	0
Clan-Mystik	2
mousesports	2
H2k Gaming	0
Reason Gaming	2
hudsGz TEAM	1
Meet Your Makers	0
To Be Announced	2
partyastronauts	0
Natus Vincere	2

Round 2
Virtus.pro	2
Team Alternate	0
3DMAX	1
Clan-Mystik	2
mousesports	0
Reason Gaming	2
To Be Announced	1
Natus Vincere	2

Qualified
Virtus.pro	Q
Clan-Mystik	Q
Reason Gaming	Q
Natus Vincere	Q

Katowice 2014
Katowice 2014	→
Katowice 2014	→

Loser's Bracket

Quarterfinals
To Be Announced	2
USSR Team	1
mousesports	2
Wizards e-Sports Club	0
3DMAX	2
H2k Gaming	1
Team Alternate	2
Meet Your Makers	1

Semifinals
To Be Announced	0
mousesports	2
3DMAX	2
Team Alternate	1

Finals
mousesports	Q
3DMAX	Q

== Broadcast Talent ==
Host

- Sean Charles

Analysts

- Scott "SirScoots" Smith
- Duncan "Thorin" Shields

Commentators

- Lauren "Pansy" Scott
- Stuart "TosspoT" Saw
- Jason Kaplan

Observer

- Joshua "steel" Nissan

== Teams ==
Legends

- compLexity Gaming
- Fnatic
- HellRaisers (Note: The Astana Dragons roster moved to HellRaisers.)
- LGB eSports
- Ninjas in Pyjamas
- Team Dignitas (Note: Team Dignitas took Copenhagen Wolves' Legends spot by signing FeTiSh, Xyp9x and device.)
- Team LDLC.com (Note: Team LDLC.com took Recursive eSports' Legends spot by signing Happy, Uzzziii and Maniac.)
- Titan (Note: The VeryGames roster moved to Titan.)

Challengers

- Team iBUYPOWER
- Vox Eminor
- 3DMAX
- Clan-Mystik
- mousesports
- Natus Vincere
- Reason Gaming
- Virtus.pro

== Group stage ==
=== Group A ===
Pos	Team	W	L	RF	RA	RD	Pts
1	Virtus.pro	2	0	35	23	+12	6
2	HellRaisers	2	1	48	32	+6	6
3	Titan	1	2	37	37	=0	3
4	mousesports	0	2	14	32	−18	0

Group A matches
Team	Score	Map	Score	Team
Titan	16	Dust II	5	mousesports
HellRaisers	16	Mirage	19	Virtus.pro
Titan	7	Mirage	16	Virtus.pro
HellRaisers	16	Dust II	9	mousesports
Titan	14	Inferno	16	HellRaisers

=== Group B ===
Pos	Team	W	L	RF	RA	RD	Pts
1	Ninjas in Pyjamas	2	0	32	12	+20	6
2	Team LDLC.com	2	1	39	42	−3	6
3	3DMAX	1	2	34	39	−5	3
4	Vox Eminor	0	2	20	32	−12	0

Group B matches
Team	Score	Map	Score	Team
Ninjas in Pyjamas	16	Dust II	5	3DMAX
Team LDLC.com	16	Inferno	13	Vox Eminor
Ninjas in Pyjamas	16	Inferno	7	Team LDLC.com
Vox Eminor	7	Inferno	16	3DMAX
Team LDLC.com	16	Inferno	13	3DMAX

=== Group C ===
Pos	Team	W	L	RF	RA	RD	Pts
1	Team Dignitas	2	0	32	16	+16	6
2	Fnatic	2	1	44	35	+13	6
3	Reason Gaming	1	2	30	44	−14	3
4	Team iBUYPOWER	0	2	21	32	−11	0

Group C matches
Team	Score	Map	Score	Team
Fnatic	12	Inferno	16	Reason Gaming
Team Dignitas	16	Nuke	8	Team iBUYPOWER
Team Dignitas	16	Inferno	8	Reason Gaming
Fnatic	16	Inferno	13	Team iBUYPOWER
Reason Gaming	6	Inferno	16	Fnatic

=== Group D ===
Pos	Team	W	L	RF	RA	RD	Pts
1	LGB eSports	2	0	32	19	+13	6
2	compLexity Gaming	2	1	43	38	+5	6
3	Clan-Mystik	1	2	34	44	−10	3
4	Natus Vincere	0	2	21	32	−11	0

Group D matches
Team	Score	Map	Score	Team
compLexity Gaming	16	Inferno	6	Clan-Mystik
LGB eSports	16	Inferno	8	Natus Vincere
compLexity Gaming	11	Dust II	16	LGB eSports
Clan-Mystik	16	Dust II	13	Natus Vincere
compLexity Gaming	16	Nuke	12	Clan-Mystik

== Playoffs ==
=== Bracket ===
Quarterfinals
Ninjas in Pyjamas	2
compLexity Gaming	1
Team Dignitas	2
HellRaisers	0
Virtus.pro	2
Team LDLC.com	0
Fnatic	1
LGB eSports	2

Semifinals
Ninjas in Pyjamas	2
Team Dignitas	0
Virtus.pro	2
LGB eSports	1

Finals
Ninjas in Pyjamas	0
Virtus.pro	2

=== Quarterfinals ===
Ninjas in Pyjamas vs compLexity Gaming
Team	Score	Map	Score	Team
Ninjas in Pyjamas	12	Dust II	16	compLexity Gaming
Ninjas in Pyjamas	16	Nuke	2	compLexity Gaming
Ninjas in Pyjamas	16	Train	11	compLexity Gaming

Team Dignitas vs HellRaisers
Team	Score	Map	Score	Team
Team Dignitas	16	Dust II	7	HellRaisers
Team Dignitas	16	Mirage	11	HellRaisers
Team Dignitas	–	Inferno	–	HellRaisers

Virtus.pro vs Team LDLC.com
Team	Score	Map	Score	Team
Virtus.pro	16	Mirage	3	Team LDLC.com
Virtus.pro	16	Inferno	8	Team LDLC.com
Virtus.pro	–	Train	–	Team LDLC.com

Fnatic vs LGB eSports
Team	Score	Map	Score	Team
Fnatic	16	Inferno	11	LGB eSports
Fnatic	12	Mirage	16	LGB eSports
Fnatic	14	Train	16	LGB eSports

=== Semifinals ===
Ninjas in Pyjamas vs Team Dignitas
Team	Score	Map	Score	Team
Ninjas in Pyjamas	16	Inferno	6	Team Dignitas
Ninjas in Pyjamas	16	Nuke	5	Team Dignitas
Ninjas in Pyjamas	–	–	–	Team Dignitas

Virtus.pro vs LGB eSports
Team	Score	Map	Score	Team
Virtus.pro	16	Inferno	8	LGB eSports
Virtus.pro	14	Mirage	16	LGB eSports
Virtus.pro	16	Train	7	LGB eSports

=== Finals ===
Ninjas in Pyjamas vs Virtus.pro
Team	Score	Map	Score	Team
Ninjas in Pyjamas	9	Mirage	16	Virtus.pro
Ninjas in Pyjamas	10	Inferno	16	Virtus.pro
Ninjas in Pyjamas	–	Dust II	–	Virtus.pro

== Final standings ==
Place	Team	Prize Money	Seed for ESL One Cologne 2014	Roster	Coach
1st	Virtus.pro	US$100,000	Legends status	TaZ, NEO, pashaBiceps, byali, Snax	–
2nd	Ninjas in Pyjamas	US$50,000	Legends status	f0rest, GeT RiGhT, Xizt, friberg, Fifflaren	–
3rd–4th	Team Dignitas	US$22,000	Legends status	FeTiSh, dev1ce, cajunb, dupreeh, Xyp9x	3k2
3rd–4th	LGB eSports	US$22,000	Legends status	dennis, olofmeister, KRiMZ, twist, cype	–
5–8th	compLexity Gaming	US$10,000	Legends status	Hiko, n0thing, swag, sgares, Semphis	–
5–8th	HellRaisers	US$10,000	Legends status	ANGE1, kucher, markeloff, Dosia, AdreN	–
5–8th	Team LDLC.com	US$10,000	Legends status	Uzzziii, Happy, KQLY, apEX, Maniac	MoMan
5–8th	Fnatic	US$10,000	Legends status	Devilwalk, JW, flusha, pronax, schneider	cArn
9–12th	Titan	US$2,000	–	shox, SmithZz, NBK, ScreaM, Ex6TenZ	–
9–12th	3DMAX	US$2,000	–	aizy, gla1ve, Pimp, raalz, MSL	–
9–12th	Reason Gaming	US$2,000	–	EXR, LOMME, Friis, karrigan, smF	–
9–12th	Clan-Mystik	US$2,000	–	kioShiMa, kennyS, HaRts, GMX, Sf	–
13–16th	mousesports	US$2,000	–	tiziaN, tabseN, chrisJ, cadiaN, LEGIJA	–
13–16th	Vox Eminor	US$2,000	–	SPUNJ, AZR, Havoc, SnypeR, topguN	–
13–16th	Team iBUYPOWER	US$2,000	–	Skadoodle, adreN, DaZeD, anger, AZK	–
13–16th	Natus Vincere	US$2,000	–	Edward, Zeus, starix, seized, GuardiaN	–
