= ELEAGUE Season 1 =

Esports league season

ELEAGUE
- 2016

Tournament information
- Sport: Counter-Strike: Global Offensive
- Location: Atlanta, Georgia, United States
- Dates: May 24, 2016–July 30, 2016
- Administrator: Turner Sports; William Morris Endeavor
- Tournament format(s): Group Stage (Bo1/Bo3); Single-Elimination Brackets (Bo3)
- Venue: Turner Studios
- Teams: 24 teams
- Purse: $1,400,000 USD

Final positions
- Champions: Virtus.pro
- 1st runners-up: Fnatic
- 2nd runners-up: Natus Vincere mousesports
- MVP: Janusz "Snax" Pogorzelski

ELEAGUE Season 1 was the inaugural season of the ELEAGUE Counter-Strike: Global Offensive league, running from May 24, 2016, to July 30, 2016. This was the first CS:GO league to be broadcast on cable television in the United States, airing on TBS and streaming online on Twitch. The season featured 24 teams from across the world to compete in a 10-week season, which included a regular season and a playoffs.

On September 24, 2015 Turner Broadcasting announced that it was partnering with talent agency WME/IMG for a new esports project. Matches were broadcast live on TBS on Friday nights, starting on May 27, 2016. The broadcast was simultaneously available on the online streaming service Twitch. Matches were played at the Turner Studios facility in Atlanta, Georgia, United States. The semifinals and final were played at the Cobb Energy Center.

Turner partnered with online streaming services to bring additional video content. One such program featured the Renegades' move from Australia to the United States. Additional content was available on Bleacher Report's Team Stream App. The finals between Virtus.pro and Fnatic was also broadcast on Twitter. The production and broadcast team received positive reviews.

The season started with Luminosity Gaming sweeping Renegades in Group A's best of two and the first televised CS:GO match featured Luminosity Gaming defeating Cloud9 2–1. The season ended with Virtus.pro defeating Fnatic 2–0 to take home the first edition of ELEAGUE. At the end of the season 1 finals, analyst Richard Lewis announced that the second season of ELEAGUE would air on October 7, 2016.

== Teams competing ==
The first season's full team list was announced on April 21, 2016.

There were a total number of 24 teams competing in the league and it offers about US$1,400,000 in prize money per season. It debuted on May 24, 2016. 23 invited teams and 1 team from the qualifier will compete in ELEAGUE

- Astralis
- Cloud9
- compLexity Gaming
- Counter Logic Gaming
- Echo Fox
- FaZe Clan
- FlipSid3 Tactics
- Fnatic

- Gambit Gaming
- G2 Esports
- Luminosity Gaming
- mousesports
- Natus Vincere
- Ninjas in Pyjamas
- NRG eSports
- OpTic Gaming

- Renegades
- Selfless Gaming
- SK Gaming
- Team Dignitas
- Team EnVyUs
- Team Liquid
- Team SoloMid
- Virtus.pro

== Broadcast talent ==
Host

- Richard Lewis

Interviewers

- Chris Puckett
- Rachel "Seltzer" Quirico

Commentators

- James Bardolph
- Anders Blume
- Daniel "ddk" Kapadia
- Auguste "Semmler" Massonnat

Analysts

- Mohamad "m0E" Assad
- Dustin "dusT" Mouret
- Jason "moses" O'Toole
- Duncan "Thorin" Shields

Observers

- Heather "sapphiRe" Garozzo
- DJ "Prius" Kuntz

Producer

- Jason "Alchemist" Baker

== Format ==
Teams will be separated into six groups of four. Every week, one group will compete at a time. Tuesday and Wednesday will consist of group play to determine the standings of the group. One win gives one point to the winning team and a loss gives zero points. Each team will play the other three teams in its group twice. On Thursday, the group playoffs begin with the group semifinals, in which the team with the most points faces off against the team with the fewest points and the other two teams facing off against each other. The semifinals are in a best of three format, so the first team to win two games moves on to the group finals. The winner of those two series will face off Friday, live on TBS in the group finals, which is also a best of three. The winner of that game will move into the playoffs and the loser of that game will go into the Last Chance Qualifier bracket. In addition, the top two third place teams will also go into the Last Chance Qualifier to accommodate the last two spots in the bracket. A third place team is determined by the team with the higher seed of the two losing teams in the group semifinals.

The Last Chance Qualifier consists of eight teams – the six group runners-up and the top two third place teams. Teams will play in a single elimination bracket and each match is in a best of three format. The bracket continues until two teams remain. These two teams will earn spots in the Playoffs bracket.

The Playoffs consists of the six group winners and the top two teams out of the Last Chance Qualifier. This bracket is also a single elimination, best of three format. Teams will play and winners will advance in the bracket until a winner is decided.

== Group stage ==
Key
Team automatically advanced to Playoffs Groups
Team advanced to Last Chance Qualifier Bracket via second-place finish or via top two third-place finish in group stage
Team was eliminated in group stage

=== Group A ===
Seed	Team	Record	+/-	Points
1	Luminosity Gaming	6–0	+45	6
2	Cloud9	3–3	+8	3
3	Renegades	3–3	−14	3
4	Team Liquid	0–6	−39	0

Group A Results
Luminosity Gaming	2	0	Renegades
Team Liquid	0	2	Cloud9
Luminosity Gaming	2	0	Team Liquid
Team Liquid	0	2	Renegades
Luminosity Gaming	2	0	Cloud9
Cloud9	1	1	Renegades

Group A Scores

Group A Scores
Team	Score	Map	Score	Team
Luminosity Gaming	19	Cobblestone	17	Renegades
Luminosity Gaming	16	Train	0	Renegades
Team Liquid	11	Dust II	16	Cloud9
Team Liquid	2	Cache	16	Cloud9
Luminosity Gaming	16	Dust II	6	Team Liquid
Luminosity Gaming	16	Cobblestone	14	Team Liquid
Team Liquid	14	Mirage	16	Renegades
Team Liquid	10	Train	16	Renegades
Luminosity Gaming	16	Dust II	7	Cloud9
Luminosity Gaming	16	Train	10	Cloud9
Cloud9	16	Train	7	Renegades
Cloud9	11	Cobblestone	16	Renegades

==== Group A Bracket ====
Semifinals
A1	Luminosity Gaming	2
A4	Team Liquid	0
A2	Cloud9	2
A3	Renegades	0

Finals
A1	Luminosity Gaming	2
A2	Cloud9	1

Group A Bracket Scores

Group A Bracket Scores
Team	Score	Map	Score	Team
Luminosity Gaming	16	Mirage	6	Team Liquid
Luminosity Gaming	16	Nuke	12	Team Liquid
Luminosity Gaming	–	Dust II	–	Team Liquid
Cloud9	16	Cobblestone	3	Renegades
Cloud9	16	Cache	11	Renegades
Cloud9	–	Train	–	Renegades
Luminosity Gaming	11	Mirage^{†}	16	Cloud9
Luminosity Gaming	19	Cobblestone^{†}	16	Cloud9
Luminosity Gaming	16	Dust II^{†}	9	Cloud9

=== Group B ===
Seed	Team	Record	+/-	Points
1	G2 Esports	6–0	+33	6
2	Ninjas in Pyjamas	4–2	+18	4
3	OpTic Gaming	2–4	−15	2
4	Selfless Gaming	0–6	−36	0

Group B Results
Ninjas in Pyjamas	2	0	OpTic Gaming
G2 Esports	2	0	Selfless Gaming
Ninjas in Pyjamas	0	2	G2 Esports
G2 Esports	2	0	OpTic Gaming
Ninjas in Pyjamas	2	0	Selfless Gaming
OpTic Gaming	2	0	Selfless Gaming

Group B Scores

Group B Scores
Team	Score	Map	Score	Team
Ninjas in Pyjamas	16	Cobblestone	4	OpTic Gaming
Ninjas in Pyjamas	16	Train	10	OpTic Gaming
G2 Esports	16	Cobblestone	12	Selfess Gaming
G2 Esports	16	Cache	12	Selfless Gaming
Ninjas in Pyjamas	9	Train	16	G2 Esports
Ninjas in Pyjamas	12	Dust II	16	G2 Esports
G2 Esports	16	Train	14	OpTic Gaming
G2 Esports	16	Nuke	10	OpTic Gaming
Ninjas in Pyjamas	16	Cobblestone	9	Selfess Gaming
Ninjas in Pyjamas	16	Cache	12	Selfless Gaming
Selfless Gaming	1	Cobblestone	16	OpTic Gaming
Selfless Gaming	14	Mirage	16	OpTic Gaming

==== Group B Bracket ====
Semifinals
B1	G2 Esports	2
B4	Selfless Gaming	0
B2	Ninjas in Pyjamas	2
B3	OpTic Gaming	1

Finals
B1	G2 Esports	1
B2	Ninjas in Pyjamas	2

Group B Bracket Scores

Group B Bracket Scores
Team	Score	Map	Score	Team
G2 Esports	16	Cache	2	Selfless Gaming
G2 Esports	16	Train	8	Selfless Gaming
G2 Esports	–	Cobblestone	–	Selfless Gaming
Ninjas in Pyjamas	3	Cobblestone	16	OpTic Gaming
Ninjas in Pyjamas	16	Overpass	2	OpTic Gaming
Ninjas in Pyjamas	16	Train	14	OpTic Gaming
G2 Esports	9	Cache^{†}	16	Ninjas in Pyjamas
G2 Esports	3	Train^{†}	16	Ninjas in Pyjamas
G2 Esports	–	Cobblestone	–	Ninjas in Pyjamas

=== Group C ===
Seed	Team	Record	+/-	Points
1	Astralis	5–1	+29	5
2	SK Gaming	4–2	+31	4
3	Counter Logic Gaming	2–4	−28	2
4	NRG eSports	1–5	−32	1

Group C Results
Astralis	2	0	NRG eSports
SK Gaming	1	1	Counter Logic Gaming
Astralis	2	0	Counter Logic Gaming
Counter Logic Gaming	1	1	NRG eSports
Astralis	1	1	SK Gaming
SK Gaming	2	0	NRG eSports

Group C Scores

Group C Scores
Team	Score	Map	Score	Team
Astralis	16	Cache	12	NRG eSports
Astralis	16	Nuke	3	NRG eSports
SK Gaming	16	Nuke	3	Counter Logic Gaming
SK Gaming	14	Train	16	Counter Logic Gaming
Astralis	16	Overpass	2	Counter Logic Gaming
Astralis	16	Train	6	Counter Logic Gaming
Counter Logic Gaming	16	Train	7	NRG eSports
Counter Logic Gaming	14	Dust II	16	NRG eSports
Astralis	6	Train	16	SK Gaming
Astralis	16	Overpass	7	SK Gaming
SK Gaming	16	Nuke	8	NRG eSports
SK Gaming	16	Cobblestone	5	NRG eSports

==== Group C Bracket ====
Semifinals
C1	Astralis	2
C4	NRG eSports	0
C2	SK Gaming	1
C3	Counter Logic G.	2

Finals
C1	Astralis	2
C3	Counter Logic G.	1

Group C Bracket Scores

Group C Bracket Scores
Team	Score	Map	Score	Team
Astralis	16	Overpass	13	NRG eSports
Astralis	19	Cache	16	NRG eSports
Astralis	–	Cobblestone	–	NRG eSports
SK Gaming	16	Train	6	Counter Logic Gaming
SK Gaming	14	Overpass	16	Counter Logic Gaming
SK Gaming	10	Cobblestone	16	Counter Logic Gaming
Astralis	16	Mirage^{†}	7	Counter Logic Gaming
Astralis	16	Dust II^{†}	19	Counter Logic Gaming
Astralis	16	Overpass^{†}	11	Counter Logic Gaming

=== Group D ===
Seed	Team	Record	+/-	Points
1	Fnatic	5–1	+41	5
2	FaZe Clan	5–1	+20	5
3	Team Dignitas	2–4	−29	2
4	Team SoloMid	0–6	−32	0

Group D matches
Fnatic	2	0	Team SoloMid
FaZe Clan	2	0	Team Dignitas
Fnatic	1	1	FaZe Clan
FaZe Clan	2	0	Team SoloMid
Fnatic	2	0	Team Dignitas
Team Dignitas	2	0	Team SoloMid

Group D Scores

Group D Scores
Team	Score	Map	Score	Team
Fnatic	16	Cache	13	Team SoloMid
Fnatic	16	Mirage	3	Team SoloMid
FaZe Clan	16	Cobblestone	5	Team Dignitas
FaZe Clan	16	Mirage	6	Team Dignitas
Fnatic	16	Cobblestone	0	FaZe Clan
Fnatic	8	Mirage	16	FaZe Clan
FaZe Clan	16	Cobblestone	13	Team SoloMid
FaZe Clan	16	Train	12	Team SoloMid
Fnatic	16	Cobblestone	9	Team SoloMid
Fnatic	16	Dust II	6	Team SoloMid
Team Dignitas	16	Mirage	12	Team SoloMid
Team Dignitas	16	Dust II	11	Team SoloMid

==== Group D Bracket ====
Semifinals
D1	Fnatic	2
D4	Team SoloMid	1
D2	FaZe Clan	2
D3	Team Dignitas	1

Finals
D1	Fnatic	2
D2	FaZe Clan	0

Group D Bracket Scores

Group D Bracket Scores
Team	Score	Map	Score	Team
Fnatic	16	Cache	12	Team SoloMid
Fnatic	11	Mirage	16	Team SoloMid
Fnatic	16	Cobblestone	6	Team SoloMid
FaZe Clan	16	Cache	10	Team Dignitas
FaZe Clan	14	Overpass	16	Team Dignitas
FaZe Clan	16	Mirage	14	Team Dignitas
Fnatic	16	Cache^{†}	12	FaZe Clan
Fnatic	16	Cobblestone^{†}	5	FaZe Clan
Fnatic	–	Nuke	–	FaZe Clan

=== Group E ===
Seed	Team	Record	+/-	Points
1	Natus Vincere	4–2	+23	4
2	mousesports	4–2	0	4
3	FlipSid3 Tactics	2–4	−8	2
4	Echo Fox	2–4	−15	2

Group E Results
Natus Vincere	1	1	Echo Fox
mousesports	1	1	FlipSid3 Tactics
Natus Vincere	1	1	mousesports
mousesports	2	0	Echo Fox
Natus Vincere	2	0	FlipSid3 Tactics
FlipSid3 Tactucs	1	1	Echo Fox

Group E Scores

Group E Scores
Team	Score	Map	Score	Team
Natus Vincere	16	Train	6	Echo Fox
Natus Vincere	11	Dust II	16	Echo Fox
mousesports	19	Train	16	FlipSid3 Tactics
mousesports	6	Cobblestone	16	FlipSid3 Tactics
Natus Vincere	6	Mirage	16	mousesports
Natus Vincere	16	Cobblestone	6	mousesports
mousesports	16	Cobblestone	12	Echo Fox
mousesports	16	Train	13	Echo Fox
Natus Vincere	16	Overpass	8	FlipSid3 Tactics
Natus Vincere	16	Train	6	FlipSid3 Tactics
FlipSid3 Tactics	5	Nuke	16	Echo Fox
FlipSid3 Tactics	16	Train	2	Echo Fox

==== Group E Bracket ====
Semifinals
E1	Natus Vincere	2
E4	Echo Fox	0
E2	mousesports	0
E3	FlipSid3 Tactics	2

Finals
E1	Natus Vincere	2
E3	FlipSid3 Tactics	0

Group E Bracket Scores

Group E Bracket Scores
Team	Score	Map	Score	Team
Natus Vincere	16	Nuke	9	Echo Fox
Natus Vincere	16	Overpass	4	Echo Fox
Natus Vincere	–	Cobblestone	–	Echo Fox
mousesports	9	Overpass	16	FlipSid3 Tactics
mousesports	9	Cache	16	FlipSid3 Tactics
mousesports	–	Train	–	FlipSid3 Tactics
Natus Vincere	16	Train^{†}	13	FlipSid3 Tactics
Natus Vincere	16	Mirage^{†}	2	FlipSid3 Tactics
Natus Vincere	–	Overpass	–	FlipSid3 Tactics

=== Group F ===
Seed	Team	Record	+/-	Points
1	Team EnVyUs	5–1	+23	5
2	Virtus.pro	4–2	+15	4
3	Gambit Gaming	2–4	−12	2
4	compLexity Gaming	1–5	−26	1

Group F Results
Virtus.pro	2	0	compLexity Gaming
Team EnVyUs	2	0	Gambit Gaming
Virtus.pro	1	1	Team EnVyUs
Team EnVyUs	2	0	compLexity Gaming
Virtus.pro	1	1	Gambit Gaming
Gambit Gaming	1	1	compLexity Gaming

Group F Scores

Group F Scores
Team	Score	Map	Score	Team
Virtus.pro	16	Overpass	7	compLexity Gaming
Virtus.pro	16	Cobblestone	11	compLexity Gaming
Team EnVyUs	16	Dust II	13	Gambit Gaming
Team EnVyUs	16	Cobblestone	9	Gambit Gaming
Virtus.pro	19	Mirage	16	Team EnVyUs
Virtus.pro	11	Cache	16	Team EnVyUs
Team EnVyUs	16	Train	12	compLexity Gaming
Team EnVyUs	16	Cobblestone	9	compLexity Gaming
Virtus.pro	12	Nuke	16	Gambit Gaming
Virtus.pro	16	Train	9	Gambit Gaming
Gambit Gaming	14	Cache	16	compLexity Gaming
Gambit Gaming	16	Train	13	compLexity Gaming

==== Group F Bracket ====
Semifinals
F1	Team EnVyUs	2
F4	compLexity Gaming	0
F2	Virtus.pro	2
F3	Gambit Gaming	0

Finals
F1	Team EnVyUs	2
F2	Virtus.pro	0

Group F Bracket Scores

Group F Bracket Scores
Team	Score	Map	Score	Team
Team EnVyUs	16	Dust II	9	compLexity Gaming
Team EnVyUs	16	Cache	8	compLexity Gaming
Team EnVyUs	–	Dust II	–	compLexity Gaming
Virtus.pro	16	Mirage	6	Gambit Gaming
Virtus.pro	16	Cobblestone	6	Gambit Gaming
Virtus.pro	–	Train	–	Gambit Gaming
Team EnVyUs	16	Train^{†}	11	Virtus.pro
Team EnVyUs	16	Cache^{†}	8	Virtus.pro
Team EnVyUs	–	Cobblestone	–	Virtus.pro

=== Third place team standings ===
The top two teams in this list will join the second place teams in the Last Chance Qualifier bracket. However, since Luminosity Gaming and SK Gaming were disqualified, Cloud9 took Luminosity's first seed and Renegades took Cloud9's second seed. Thus, Gambit Gaming was considered the second team in the third-place rankings.

Seed	Team	Record	+/-	Points
1	SK Gaming	4–2	+33	4
2	mousesports	4–2	0	4
3	Renegades	3–3	−14	3
4	Gambit Gaming	2–4	−12	2
5	OpTic Gaming	2–4	−18	2
6	Team Dignitas	2–4	−35	2

=== Regular season standings ===
Final Standings
Place	Team	W-L	RF-RA	RD	Points
1	Luminosity Gaming	10–1	177–113	+64	12
2	Team EnVyUs	9–1	160–109	+51	11
3	Fnatic	9–2	152–93	+59	11
4	Astralis	9–2	152–93	+59	11
5	Natus Vincere	8–2	145–86	+59	10
6	Ninjas in Pyjamas	8–3	152–111	+41	10
7	G2 Esports	8–2	140–105	+35	8
8	FaZe Clan	7–2	143–132	+11	7
9	Virtus.pro	6–4	141–119	+22	6
10	Cloud9	5–4	149–128	+21	5
11	Counter Logic Gaming	5–7	132–133	−1	4
12	FlipSid3 Tactics	4–6	114–125	−11	4
13	SK Gaming	5–4	125–92	+33	4
14	mousesports	4–4	97–111	−14	4
15	Renegades	3–5	86–118	−32	3
16	OpTic Gaming	3–6	96–114	−18	2
17	Gambit Gaming	2–6	89–121	−33	2
18	Echo Fox	2–4	78–112	−34	2
19	Team Dignitas	3–6	98–133	−35	2
20	NRG eSports	1–7	91–128	−39	1
21	compLexity Gaming	1–7	79–126	−47	1
22	Team SoloMid	1–8	98–139	−41	0
23	Team Liquid	0–8	75–128	−53	0
24	Selfless Gaming	0–8	70–128	−58	0

^{†}Game was broadcast on TBS.

== Last Chance bracket ==
Quarterfinals
E2	FlipSid3 Tactics	0
A3	Renegades	2
F2	Virtus.pro	2
F3	Gambit Gaming	0
B2	G2 Esports	1
E3	mousesports	2
D2	FaZe Clan	2
C2	Counter Logic G.	1

Semifinals
A3	Renegades	0
F2	Virtus.pro	2
E3	mousesports	2
D2	FaZe Clan	1

Finals
F2	Virtus.pro	Q
E3	mousesports	Q

Quarterfinals Scores

Quarterfinals
Team	Score	Map	Score	Team
FlipSid3 Tactics	5	Cobblestone	16	Renegades
FlipSid3 Tactics	5	Train	16	Renegades
FlipSid3 Tactics	–	Nuke	–	Renegades
Virtus.pro	19	Dust II	17	Gambit Gaming
Virtus.pro	16	Mirage	6	Gambit Gaming
Virtus.pro	–	Train	–	Gambit Gaming
G2 Esports	9	Dust II	16	mousesports
G2 Esports	25	Cache	22	mousesports
G2 Esports	17	Overpass	19	mousesports
Counter Logic Gaming	4	Overpass	16	FaZe Clan
Counter Logic Gaming	16	Nuke	14	FaZe Clan
Counter Logic Gaming	19	Cache	22	FaZe Clan

Semifinals Scores

Semifinals
Team	Score	Map	Score	Team
Renegades	9	Cobblestone	16	Virtus.pro
Renegades	20	Mirage	22	Virtus.pro
Renegades	–	Train	–	Virtus.pro
mousesports	9	Train^{†}	16	FaZe Clan
mousesports	16	Dust II^{†}	3	FaZe Clan
mousesports	19	Cache^{†}	17	FaZe Clan

^{†} Game was broadcast on TBS.

== Playoffs ==
Quarterfinals
F1	Team EnVyUs	0
D1	Fnatic	2
E1	Natus Vincere	2
A2	Cloud9	0
C1	Astralis	0
E3	mousesports	2
F2	Virtus.pro	2
B1	Ninjas in Pyjamas	0

Semifinals
D1	Fnatic	2
E1	Natus Vincere	0
E3	mousesports	0
F2	Virtus.pro	2

Finals
D1	Fnatic	0
F2	Virtus.pro	2

Quarterfinals Scores

Quarterfinals
Team	Score	Map	Score	Team
Team EnVyUs	13	Cobblestone	16	Fnatic
Team EnVyUs	7	Dust II	16	Fnatic
Team EnVyUs	–	Nuke	–	Fnatic
Natus Vincere	19	Dust II	15	Cloud9
Natus Vincere	9	Mirage	16	Cloud9
Natus Vincere	16	Dust II	14	Cloud9
Astralis	2	Mirage	16	mousesports
Astralis	12	Dust II	16	mousesports
Astralis	–	Cache	–	mousesports
Ninjas in Pyjamas	8	Dust II^{†}	16	Virtus.pro
Ninjas in Pyjamas	9	Cobblestone^{†}	16	Virtus.pro
Ninjas in Pyjamas	–	Train	–	Virtus.pro

Semifinals Scores

Semifinals
Team	Score	Map	Score	Team
Fnatic	16	Cobblestone	4	Natus Vincere
Fnatic	16	Train	14	Natus Vincere
Fnatic	–	Train	–	Natus Vincere
mousesports	7	Train^{†}	16	Virtus.pro
mousesports	10	Train^{†}	16	Virtus.pro
mousesports	–	Train	–	Virtus.pro

Finals Scores

Finals
Team	Score	Map	Score	Team
Fnatic	10	Cobblestone^{†}	16	Virtus.pro
Fnatic	8	Mirage^{†}	16	Virtus.pro
Fnatic	–	Train	–	Virtus.pro

^{†} Game was broadcast on TBS.

== Final standings ==
Final Standings
Place	Prize Money	Team	Roster
1st	$400,000	Virtus.pro^{1}	TaZ, NEO, pashaBiceps, Snax, byali
2nd	$140,000	Fnatic	flusha, olofmeister, JW, dennis, KRiMZ
3rd – 4th	$70,000	mousesports^{1}	nex, denis, Spiidi, chrisJ, NiKo
3rd – 4th	$60,000	Natus Vincere	Zeus, Edward, flamie, seized, GuardiaN
5th – 8th	$50,000	Team EnVyUs	kennyS, Happy, apEX, DEVIL, NBK-
5th – 8th	$50,000	Cloud9^{2}	Stewie2K, Skadoodle, n0thing, Slemmy, shroud
5th – 8th	$50,000	Astralis	dev1ce, karrigan, Xyp9x, dupreeh, Kjaerbye, zonic
5th – 8th	$50,000	Ninjas in Pyjamas	GeT RiGhT, f0rest, Xizt, friberg, pyth
9th – 10th	$40,000	Renegades^{2}	AZR, jks, Yam, USTILO, Rickeh, SPUNJ
9th – 10th	$40,000	FaZe Clan	fox, rain, jkaem, aizy, kioShiMa
11th – 14th	$40,000	Flipsid3 Tactics	Blad3, markeloff, Shara, WorldEdit, waylander
11th – 14th	$40,000	Gambit Gaming^{2}	hooch, Dosia, spaze, DavCost, mou, AdreN
11th – 14th	$40,000	G2 Esports	shox, bodyy, Rpk, SmithZz, Fuks, ScreaM
11th – 14th	$40,000	Counter Logic Gaming	reltuC, tarik, hazed, jdm64, koosta, pita
15th – 16th	$30,000	OpTic Gaming	daps, NAF, stanislaw, RUSH, mixwell
15th – 16th	$30,000	Team Dignitas	cajunb, k0nfig, tenzki, MSL, RUBINO
17th – 22nd	$30,000	Echo Fox	sgares, ryx, roca, ShahZam, fREAKAZOiD
17th – 22nd	$30,000	NRG eSports	ptr, FugLy, tabseN, gob b, LEGIJA
17th – 22nd	$30,000	compLexity Gaming	sancz, witmer, dephh, Surreal, androidx23
17th – 22nd	$30,000	Team SoloMid	autimatic, SicK, Semphis, FNS, Cadian
17th – 22nd	$30,000	Team Liquid	Hiko, nitr0, EliGE, koosta, adreN
17th – 22nd	$30,000	Selfless Gaming	Relyks, MAiNLiNE, Nifty, mitch, CoNnOrRr93
DQ	–	Luminosity Gaming^{2, 3}	FalleN, coldzera, TACO, fnx, fer
DQ	–	SK Gaming^{2, 3}	Friis, AcilioN, Magiskb0Y, Pimp, MODDII

^{1}Virtus.pro and mousesports received an additional $10,000 for winning the Last Chance Qualifier

^{2}Luminosity Gaming and SK Gaming were disqualified from the tournament due to SK Gaming letting go of its Danish squad and acquiring Luminosity Gaming's team. This does "not comply with" ELEAGUE rules, according to the commissioner at ELEAGUE. Cloud9 took Luminosity's spot in the playoffs, Renegades took Cloud9's spot in the Last Chance Qualifier, and Gambit Gaming took SK Gaming's spot in the third place group stage standings, which lead the Russians to the Last Chance Qualifier.

^{3}Luminosity Gaming (now with SK Gaming) and SK Gaming (now with Team X) were still eligible for unspecified winnings, despite the rulebook stating that disqualified teams forfeit all potential winnings.
