= F0rest =

Swedish esports player (born 1988)

f0rest
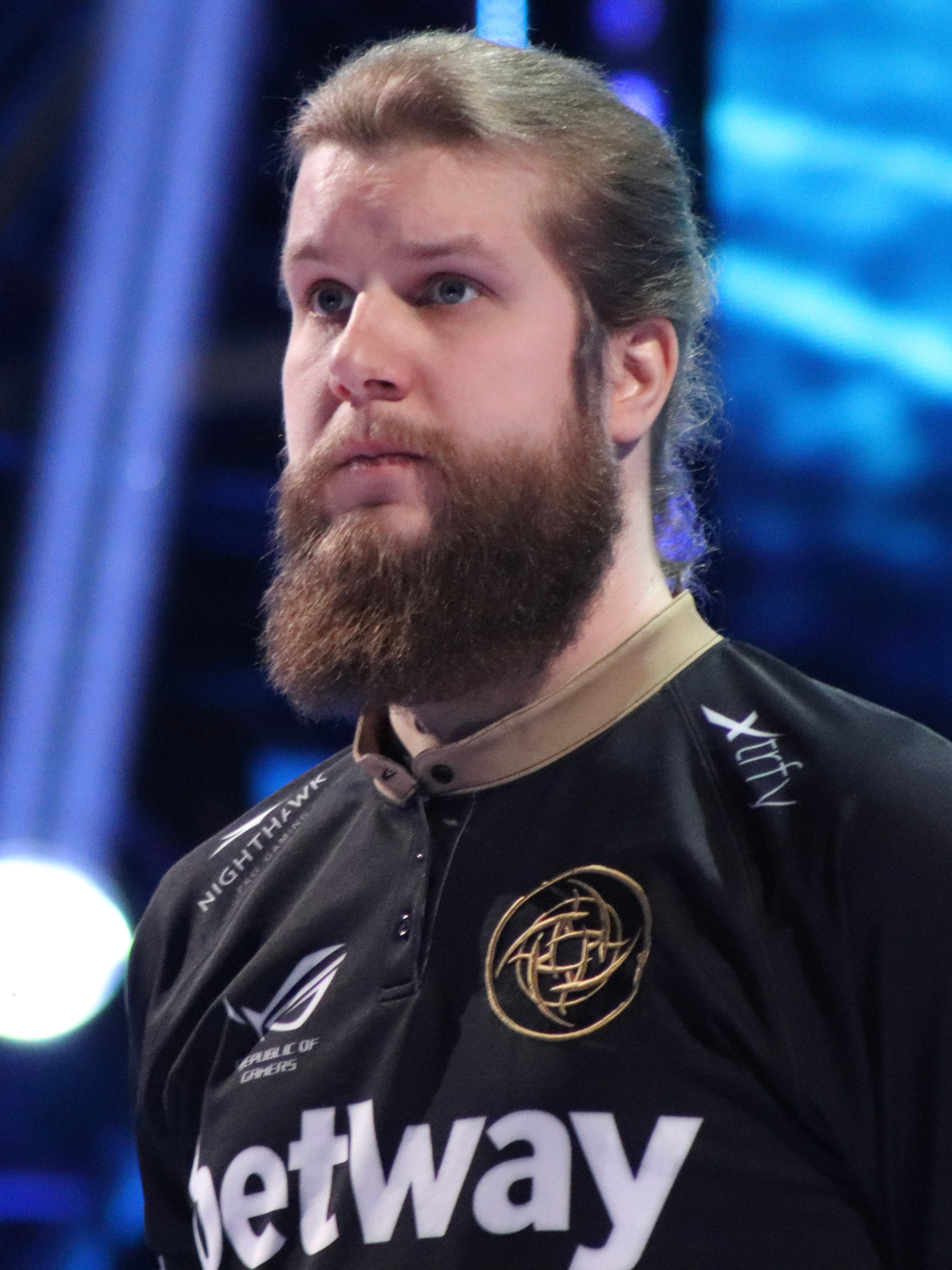
- Lindberg in 2019

Personal information
- Name: Patrik Lindberg
- Born: June 10, 1988 (age 38)
- Nationality: Swedish

Career information
- Games: Counter Strike; Counter-Strike: Global Offensive
- Playing career: 2005–2024
- Role(s): Rifler, AWPer

Team history
- 2005–2006: Begrip Gaming
- 2006–2010: Fnatic
- 2010–2012: SK Gaming
- 2012–2020: Ninjas in Pyjamas
- 2020–2022: Dignitas

Career highlights and awards
- CS:GO Major champion (Cologne 2014); 4x HLTV Top 20 Player of the Year (2013–2016); 8x HLTV MVP; GGL Counter-Strike Player of 2006; HLTV Hall of Fame inductee (2024)
Medal record
Esports
Representing Sweden
European Nations Champions
| Gold medal – first place | 2008 Leipzig | Counter-Strike |
| Gold medal – first place | 2006 Leipzig | Counter-Strike |
Nations Cup
| Gold medal – first place | NationsCup XV | Counter-Strike |
| Bronze medal – third place | NationsCup XI | Counter-Strike |

Patrik Lindberg (born June 10, 1988), known by the pseudonym f0rest, is a Swedish esports player who is considered to be one of the best Counter-Strike players in the world. Having played competitively since 2005, Lindberg has been widely regarded within the esports scene as the greatest player in Counter-Strike history. Lindberg is best known for his four years of tenure on the Fnatic roster, which he helped bring to prominence as the dominant team of 2009, during which year the team broke the record for the highest-earning team in Counter-Strike history. Near the end of 2010, Lindberg left Fnatic and joined SK Gaming, which he remained with until July 2012. Soon after, he transitioned over to Counter-Strike: Global Offensive and joined the team Ninjas in Pyjamas. In 2020, Lindberg left NiP to join Dignitas.

== Professional career ==
Lindberg began his professional gaming career in early 2005, when he made his international debut at the global finals in South Korea for the World e-Sports Games, alongside the new Swedish team of Begrip Gaming. There, Begrip defeated all opponents, including the defending champions Catch-Gamers and won the prize pot of 50,000 USD. Following this victory, Lindberg dropped out of high school to concentrate on his Counter-Strike career. In 2005, Lindberg was nominated for the eSports Award 2005, under the categories for "Newcomer of the Year" and "Best Counter-Strike Player". In early 2006, Lindberg left Begrip alongside his teammate Kristoffer "Tentpole" Nordlund, and signed a contract with Fnatic and became a permanent member of the team.

Lindberg's first year in Fnatic proved to be successful, having the team earn upwards of US$100,000, which was acknowledged by Turtle Entertainment. During 2006, Fnatic won the Cyberathlete Professional League Championship, the World Tour, along with a silver medal at the Electronic Sports World Cup. Lindberg was once again nominated for the eSports Award and won the Counter-Strike Player of the Year Award. However, Fnatic faced a major slump from 2007 through 2008, as the team failed to win any major tournaments and only achieved a handful of medals. The team regained its form and chemistry in 2009, however, with the retirement of Oscar "Archi" Torgersen and Oscar "ins" Holm and the recruitment of Christopher "GeT_Right" Alesund and Rasmus "GuX" Ståhl. During 2009, Fnatic was the single most-dominant team, having garnered gold medal victories at the Intel Extreme Masters Global Challenge, European Finals and World Championship, ESWC 2009, e-Stars Seoul, KODE5 and World eSports Masters. In 2009, Lindberg was nominated for the eSports Award 2009, under the category of "Regional eSports Player of the Year Northern Europe", but lost to his teammate Alesund, who won the main category for eSports Player of the Year.

Fnatic could not repeat its success from 2009 in the 2010 season, however, as the team found itself at odds with the Ukrainians from Natus Vincere, with their winnings being upward of US$220,000. Following this underwhelming year, Lindberg, along with his teammates Alesund and Ståhl, attempted to have Fnatic replace the team's in-game leader, Patrik "cArn" Sättermon, as well as its captain, Harley "dsn" Örwall, with SK Gaming's Jimmy "allen" Allén and Robert "RobbaN" Dahlström. This was, however, not approved, so Lindberg and Alesund left Fnatic and joined SK Gaming. Early 2011 proved to be slow for SK, as they failed to impress at their first event, IEM European Championship Finals, being unable to surpass the group stage, while Lindberg's previous team won the event themselves. SK Gaming managed to regain their form, however, and finished as the second highest-earning team of 2011, behind the Polish team of ESC Gaming.

On July 26, 2012, it was reported that SK Gaming had gone into a state of disarray, with the head coach, Anton Budak, resigning from the organization, along with Patrik Lindberg and his teammates Robert Dahlström and Christopher Alesund. According to Budak, this came as a result of SK refusing to send the players to GameGune 2012. The following August, it was announced that Lindberg would be making a transition over to Counter-Strike: Global Offensive, by joining the team Ninjas in Pyjamas, which included Alesund in its roster. From the beginning of the competitive Counter-Strike: Global Offensive scene in 2012, Ninjas in Pyjamas became the single most dominant team, having won the vast majority of the tournaments they attended, as well as maintaining an 87-map winning streak for a time. Ninjas in Pyjamas has maintained their dominance for the years of 2012 and 2013. Ninjas in Pyjamas reached the grand finals of all major $250,000 Counter-Strike: Global Offensive tournaments until ESL One Cologne 2015. In August 2014 they won ESL One Cologne. At Dreamhack Cluj-Napoca where they were ousted by NaVi in the semi-finals.

== Notable tournament results ==
Bold denotes a CS:GO Major

| Game | Year | Place | Tournament | Team | Winning score | Opponent | Prize money | Awards |
|---|---|---|---|---|---|---|---|---|
| Counter-Strike | 2005 | 1st | World e-Sports Games Grand Finals | Begrip Gaming | 2–0 | Catch-Gamer | $50,000.00 | |
| Counter-Strike | 2006 | 1st | Counter-Strike Champions League | Fnatic | 2–0 | Mousesports | $10,000.00 | |
| Counter-Strike | 2006 | 1st | CPL World Tour | Fnatic | 16–6 (Bo1) | Speed-Link | $10,000.00 | |
| Counter-Strike | 2006 | 1st | CPL Winter 2006 | Fnatic | 2–1 | MeetYourMakers | $30,000.00 | |
| Counter-Strike | 2007 | 1st | GameGune 2007 | Fnatic | 2–0 | Made in Brazil | $12,000.00 | |
| Counter-Strike | 2007 | 1st | World e-Sports Games Seoul | Fnatic | 2–0 | X7-Hacker | $25,000.00 | |
| Counter-Strike | 2007 | 1st | NLG One | Fnatic | 2–0 | SK Gaming | $20,000.00 | |
| Counter-Strike | 2007 | 1st | Intel Extreme Masters Los Angeles | Fnatic | 16–5 (Bo1) | SK Gaming | $25,000.00 | |
| Counter-Strike | 2008 | 1st | NLG One | Fnatic | 3–2 | Roccat | $20,000.00 | |
| Counter-Strike | 2008 | 1st | Samsung Euro Championship 2008 | Fnatic | 2–1 | MeetYourMakers | $19,700.00 | |
| Counter-Strike | 2008 | 1st | IEM III Global Challenge Montreal | Fnatic | 2–1 | SK Gaming | $25,000.00 | |
| Counter-Strike | 2009 | 1st | IEM Season III | Fnatic | 16–13 (Bo1) | MeetYourMakers | $50,000.00 | |
| Counter-Strike | 2009 | 1st | Electronic Sports World Cup 2009 | Fnatic | 2–0 | SK Gaming | $20,000.00 | |
| Counter-Strike | 2009 | 1st | KODE5 Global Finals | Fnatic | 2–0 | SK Gaming | $25,000.00 | |
| Counter-Strike | 2009 | 1st | World e-Sports Games Seoul | Fnatic | 2–0 | WeMade FOX | $12,000.00 | |
| Counter-Strike | 2009 | 1st | Intel Extreme Masters Dubai | Fnatic | 2–0 | MeetYourMakers | $10,000.00 | |
| Counter-Strike | 2009 | 1st | World e-Sports Masters | Fnatic | 2–0 | Power Gaming | $22,500.00 | |
| Counter-Strike | 2010 | 1st | Arbalet Cup 2010 | Fnatic | 2–1 | Natus Vincere | $15,000.00 | |
| Counter-Strike | 2010 | 1st | GameGune 2010 | Fnatic | 2–1 | Frag eXecutors | $15,500.00 | |
| Counter-Strike | 2010 | 1st | Intel Extreme Masters Shanghai | Fnatic | 2–0 | TyLoo.raw | $14,000.00 | |
| Counter-Strike | 2010 | 1st | Komplett Gamer Challenge | Fnatic | 2–0 | Full-Gaming | $19,400.00 | |
| Counter-Strike | 2011 | 1st | IOL FINAL4 2011 | SK Gaming | 2–0 | Fnatic | $8,000.00 | |
| Counter-Strike | 2011 | 1st | DreamHack Summer 2011 | SK Gaming | 2–0 | mTw | $9,600.00 | |
| Counter-Strike | 2011 | 1st | Intel Challenge Super Cup 8 | SK Gaming | 2–1 | Moscow Five | $5,000.00 | |
| Counter-Strike | 2011 | 1st | GameGune 2011 | SK Gaming | 16–14 (Bo1) | ESC Gaming | $17,223.00 | |
| Counter-Strike | 2011 | 1st | Intel Extreme Masters New York | SK Gaming | 2–0 | WinFakt | $16,000.00 | |
| Counter-Strike | 2011 | 1st | Electronic Sports World Cup 2011 | SK Gaming | 2–0 | Natus Vincere | $12,000.00 | |
| Counter-Strike | 2012 | 1st | Copenhagen Games 2012 Challenge | SK Gaming | 16–13 (Bo1) | ESC Gaming | $1,314.00 | |
| Counter-Strike | 2012 | 1st | Esport SM Stockholm | SK Gaming | 2–1 | Fnatic | $1,314.00 | |
| Counter-Strike | 2012 | 1st | 3rd Intel Core Challenge | SK Gaming | 2–0 | Fnatic | $10,000.00 | |
| CS:GO | 2012 | 1st | SteelSeries GO | Ninjas in Pyjamas | 2–0 | BuggIT | $4,546.00 | |
| CS:GO | 2012 | 1st | DreamHack Valencia 2012 | Ninjas in Pyjamas | 2–0 | VeryGames | $3,236.00 | HLTV MVP |
| CS:GO | 2012 | 1st | Electronic Sports World Cup 2012 | Ninjas in Pyjamas | 2–0 | VeryGames | $10,000.00 | |
| CS:GO | 2012 | 1st | DreamHack Winter 2012 | Ninjas in Pyjamas | 2–0 | VeryGames | $22,600.00 | |
| CS:GO | 2012 | 1st | AMD Sapphire | Ninjas in Pyjamas | 2–0 | VeryGames | $10,000.00 | |
| CS:GO | 2012 | 1st | THOR Open 2012 | Ninjas in Pyjamas | 2–0 | Curse | $15,100.00 | |
| CS:GO | 2012 | 1st | NorthCon 2012 | Ninjas in Pyjamas | 2–0 | ESC Gaming | $6,580.00 | HLTV MVP |
| CS:GO | 2013 | 1st | ESL Major Series Winter 2012 | Ninjas in Pyjamas | 2–0 | Imaginary Gaming | $3,365.00 | |
| CS:GO | 2013 | 1st | Copenhagen Games 2013 | Ninjas in Pyjamas | 16–2 (Bo1) | Western Wolves | $21,156.00 | HLTV MVP |
| CS:GO | 2013 | 1st | ESEA Invite Season 13 Finals | Ninjas in Pyjamas | 2–0 | Denial eSports | $17,500.00 | |
| CS:GO | 2013 | 1st | Svecup Västerås 2013 | Ninjas in Pyjamas | 2–0 | Crave Gaming | $4,500.00 | |
| CS:GO | 2013 | 1st | Swedish Championship 2013 | Ninjas in Pyjamas | 2–1 | Epsilon | $15,500.00 | |
| CS:GO | 2013 | 1st | Dreamhack Summer 2013 | Ninjas in Pyjamas | 2–0 | Epsilon | $10,800.00 | HLTV MVP |
| CS:GO | 2013 | 1st | SLTV StarSeries VI | Ninjas in Pyjamas | 3–2 | Natus Vincere | $6,000.00 | |
| CS:GO | 2013 | 1st | ESEA Season 14 Finals | Ninjas in Pyjamas | 2–1 | compLexity | $20,000.00 | |
| CS:GO | 2013 | 2nd | **DreamHack Winter 2013** | Ninjas in Pyjamas | 1–2 | Fnatic | $50,000.00 | |
| CS:GO | 2014 | 2nd | **EMS One Katowice 2014** | Ninjas in Pyjamas | 0–2 | Virtus.pro | $50,000.00 | |
| CS:GO | 2014 | 1st | Copenhagen Games | Ninjas in Pyjamas | 2–1 | Virtus.pro | $19,370.00 | |
| CS:GO | 2014 | 1st | Dreamhack Summer 2014 | Ninjas in Pyjamas | 2–0 | Natus Vincere | $10,000.00 | HLTV MVP |
| CS:GO | 2014 | 1st | IronGaming | Ninjas in Pyjamas | 2–0 | Natus Vincere | $10,000.00 | |
| CS:GO | 2014 | 1st | **ESL One Cologne 2014** | Ninjas in Pyjamas | 2–1 | Fnatic | $100,000.00 | |
| CS:GO | 2015 | 2nd | **DreamHack Winter 2014** | Ninjas in Pyjamas | 1–2 | Team LDLC.com | $50,000.00 | |
| CS:GO | 2015 | 1st | ASUS ROG Winter 2015 | Ninjas in Pyjamas | 2–0 | Titan | $12,000.00 | |
| CS:GO | 2015 | 2nd | **ESL One Katowice 2015** | Ninjas in Pyjamas | 1–2 | Fnatic | $50,000.00 | |
| CS:GO | 2015 | 5–8th | **ESL One Cologne 2015** | Ninjas in Pyjamas | 0–2 | Virtus.pro | $10,000.00 | |
| CS:GO | 2015 | 3–4th | **DreamHack Open Cluj-Napoca 2015** | Ninjas in Pyjamas | 0–2 | Natus Vincere | $22,000.00 | |
| CS:GO | 2016 | 5–8th | **MLG Major Championship: Columbus** | Ninjas in Pyjamas | 0–2 | Natus Vincere | $35,000.00 | |
| CS:GO | 2016 | 1st | Dreamhack Masters Malmö | Ninjas in Pyjamas | 2–0 | Natus Vincere | $100,000.00 | |
| CS:GO | 2016 | 9–12th | **ESL One Cologne 2016** | Ninjas in Pyjamas | 1–2 | FlipSid3 Tactics | $8,750.00 | |
| CS:GO | 2016 | 5–8th | ELeague Season 1 | Ninjas in Pyjamas | 0–2 | Virtus.pro | $50,000.00 | |
| CS:GO | 2016 | 1st | StarLadder i-League StarSeries Season 2 | Ninjas in Pyjamas | 2–0 | G2 Esports | $130,000.00 | HLTV MVP |
| CS:GO | 2016 | 1st | Intel Extreme Masters 2016 Oakland | Ninjas in Pyjamas | 2–1 | SK Gaming | $128,000.00 | HLTV MVP |
| CS:GO | 2017 | 1st | DreamHack Open Valencia 2017 | Ninjas in Pyjamas | 2–1 | Red Reserve | $50,000.00 | |
| CS:GO | 2017 | 1st | Intel Extreme Masters 2017 Oakland | Ninjas in Pyjamas | 3–2 | FaZe Clan | $128,000.00 | |
| CS:GO | 2019 | 5–8th | **Intel Extreme Masters Season XIII – World Championship Major** | Ninjas in Pyjamas | 0–2 | Astralis | $35,000.00 | |
