= Iloveoov =

Korean professional StarCraft player

iloveoov
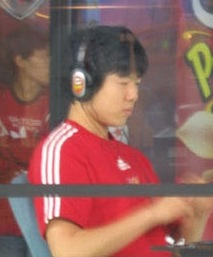
- Choi in 2008 at the MSL

Personal information
- Name: 최연성 (Choi Yeon-sung)
- Nickname: oov
- Born: 1983 or 1984 (age 42–43)
- Nationality: South Korean

Career information
- Games: StarCraft; League of Legends
- Playing career: 2003–2011
- Role: Terran, coach (StarCraft); Coach (League of Legends)
- Coaching career: 2016–2020

Team history

As player:
- 2003: Orion
- 2003–2004: 4 Union
- 2004–2011: SK Telecom T1

As coach:
- 2008–2016: SK Telecom T1
- 2016–2020: Afreeca Freecs

Career highlights and awards
- WCG champion (2006)

Choi Yeon-sung (Korean: 최연성; Hanja: 崔然星, born November 5, 1983), also known as iloveoov, is a retired professional Korean StarCraft player, and formerly a coach for the Afreeca Freecs' League of Legends team. As a Terran player he was known for his excellent macromanagement, leading to his nickname "Cheater Terran". However he is better known as "Monster Terran" (Gweh_Mool Terran) because of his ability to produce a massive number of units. The 'oov' in his nickname is believed to be the ASCII emotion icon of a face and two fingers forming letter 'V' which stands for victory.

== Career ==
He sees Lim Yo-Hwan, who was on the same team as him, as an older brother or mentor. Lim scouted Choi through a match in battlenet after losing to Choi's Terran, Zerg and Protoss. Choi beat Lim 3:2 in 2004 during the Ongamenet Ever Starleague finals.

He announced his retirement as a pro-gamer as a result of a wrist injury, to become a coach for his team. Since then, Choi returned to the active roster as a "player coach".

In 2016 SK Telecom T1 disbanded their Starcraft 2 roster and Choi became head coach for the Afreeca Freecs League of Legends team. He led the team to a quarterfinals berth at the 2018 League of Legends World Championship but was ultimately defeated 3-0 by Cloud9 and eliminated.

In subsequent seasons he failed to replicate his success, failing to qualify for the World Championship in 2019 and also failing to make playoffs in the 2020 Spring Split. In November 2020, Choi parted ways with Afreeca Freecs.

== Personal life ==
In April 2008, Choi announced his engagement to his girlfriend. Choi and his fiancée had been together for six years, even when he was training to become a professional gamer.

== Tournament results ==
- TriGem MSL Champion – September – November 2003
- HanaFOS MSL Champion – January – March 2004
- Gillette OnGameNet Starleague 3rd place – April – July 2004
- Spris MSL Champion – May – August 2004
- Ever OSL Champion – August – November 2004
- UZOO MSL 4th place – June – August 2005
- So1 OSL 3rd place – August – November 2005
- CKCG China-Korea Cyber Games Champion – October 2005
- CYON MSL 3rd place – October – January 2006
- Shinhan OSL Champion – December 2005 – March 2006
- World Cyber Games 2006 Champion – October 2006
- Second player to win 3 MSLs, after NaDa.
- 2018 League of Legends World Championship 5-8th Place - October 2018

=== Streaks ===
His streaks versus Zerg are particularly notable.

Record: 79 wins – 37 losses (68.10%)

Best Streak: 27 wins Worst Streak: 4 losses Current Streak: 1 win

=== Overall Record ===
- All: 228–143 (61.46%)
- vT: 82–62 (56.94%)
- vZ: 79–37 (68.10%)
- vP: 67–44 (60.36%)

== See also ==
- StarCraft professional competition
