= Neo (gamer) =

Polish professional Counter-Strike coach

NEO
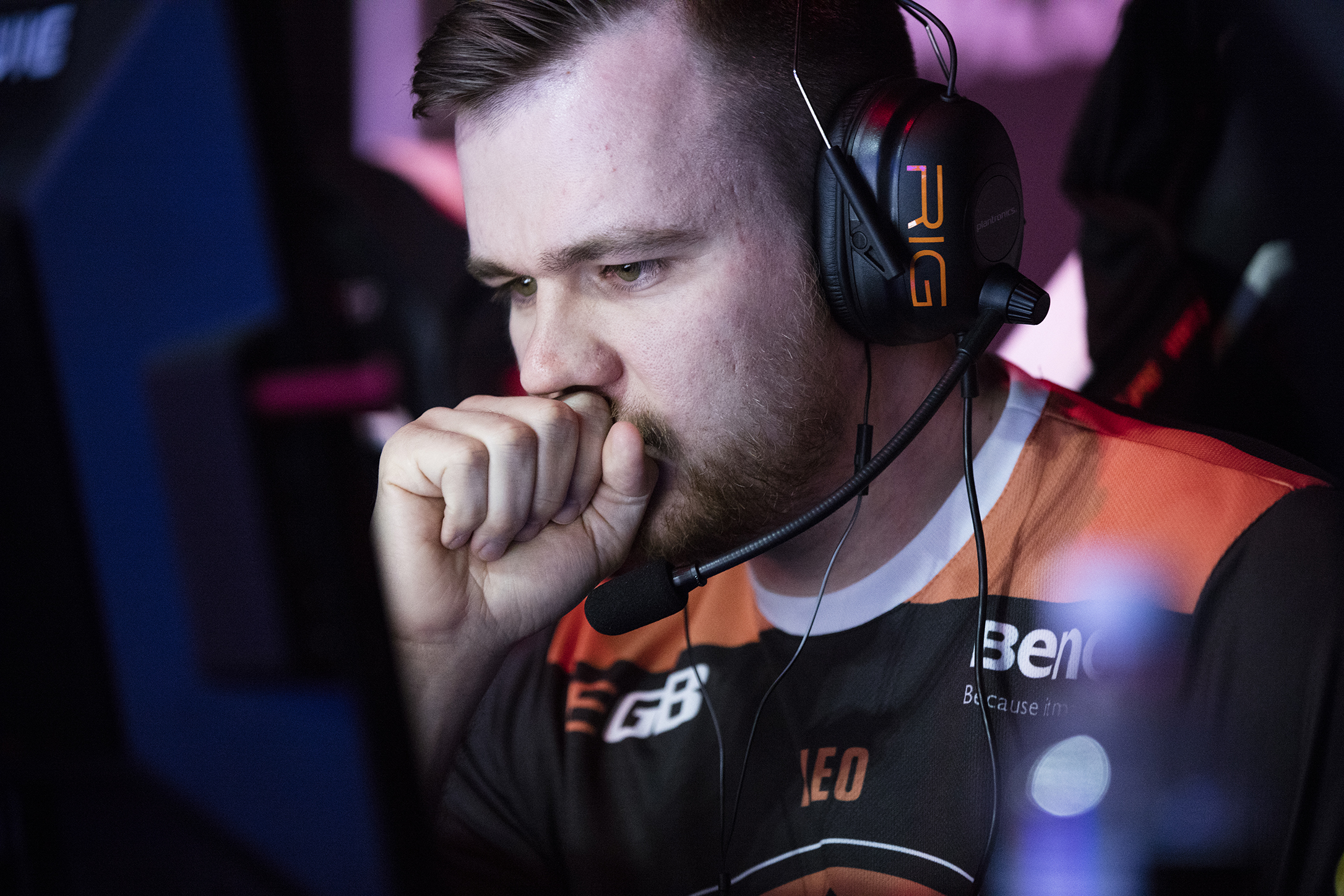

Personal information
- Name: Filip Kubski
- Born: June 15, 1987 (age 39)
- Nationality: Polish

Current team
- Team: Astralis
- Role: Coach
- Game: Counter-Strike 2

Career information
- Games: Counter-Strike; Counter-Strike: Global Offensive; Counter-Strike 2
- Playing career: 2000–2023
- Coaching career: 2023–present

Team history
- 2004–2007: Pentagram G-Shock
- 2007–2009: MeetYourMakers
- 2009: Wicked eSports
- 2009: Vitriolic
- 2009–2010: AGAiN
- 2010–2011: Frag eXecutors
- 2011: AGAiN
- 2011–2013: ESC Gaming
- 2013: Universal Soldiers
- 2013–2014: AGAiN
- 2014–2019: Virtus.pro
- 2019: FaZe Clan (Trial)
- 2020: ARCY
- 2020–2023: Honoris

As coach:
- 2023–2026: FaZe Clan
- 2026-Now: Astralis

Career highlights and awards
- CS:GO Major champion (Katowice 2014)

Filip Borys Kubski (born June 15, 1987), better known as NEO, is a Polish former professional Counter-Strike: Global Offensive and Counter-Strike player, and current professional Counter-Strike 2 coach for Astralis. NEO is considered to be one of the best players in Counter-Strike history. He was also one of the "Golden Five" group of Polish CS players. He has played for Virtus.pro, AGAiN, Universal Soldiers, ESC Gaming, Frag eXecutors, Vitriolic, Wicked eSports, Meet Your Makers, and Pentagram G-Shock. Kubski has been playing professionally since 2004.

NEO is considered to be a mechanically gifted player, with an intelligent mind for the game. Kubski is also considered to be very good at Counter-Strike 1.6's in-game movement, which makes him difficult to counter. In 2010, HLTV users voted Kubski the greatest Counter-Strike player of the decade. He also won the eSports Award for eSports Player of the Year in 2007 and 2008, and was rated by HLTV.org as the best player of 2011.

== Counter-Strike 1.6 career ==
NEO first started playing Counter-Strike at the age of 12. NEO wandered around some Polish teams before joining Pentagram G-Shock, along with what has been called the "Golden Five" lineup of Wiktor "TaZ" Wojtas, Łukasz "LUq" Wnęk, Mariusz "Loord" Cybulski, and Jakub "kuben" Gurczyński. With this lineup, they won 4 majors, World Cyber Games 2006, ESWC 2007, ESWC 2008, and WCG 2009. Even though there were no Valve organised tournaments in 1.6, generally, ESWC, CPL, WCG, and IEM are considered to be a CS 1.6 major. LUq was eventually replaced by Jarosław "pashaBiceps" Jarząbkowski in 2010. The previous Golden Five lineup is considered one of the best of all time in 1.6, and NEO was by far their best player. Following this change, the lineup would hit a slump. The team ended up winning the last 2 majors in CS 1.6 with ESC Gaming. NEO would be called by many the greatest CS 1.6 player ever. He was also given the #1 spot on the HLTV top 20 ranking in 2011.

== Counter-Strike: Global Offensive career ==
=== 2012–2018 ===
NEO continued playing with ESC Gaming, in Global Offensive. He found little success at first, winning only 2 StarLadder events. Loord and kuben were replaced by Janusz "Snax" Pogorzelski and Paweł "byali" Bieliński. Loord reacted negatively to this, but said NEO was the only one he didn't hold a grudge against. It wasn't until EMS One Katowice 2014 that NEO won a big tournament, this time with Virtus.pro. At the end of 2015, NEO was awarded the #17 spot on HLTV's top 20 of 2015. Despite this, NEO was no longer by far the best player on his team. His individual skill had dropped off significantly from his performance in 1.6. In May 2016, Virtus.pro won the first season of ELEAGUE, one of the biggest prize pools at the time. In early 2017, Virtus.pro came second to Astralis at ELEAGUE Major 2017. They followed this with a win at DreamHack Masters Las Vegas 2017. Despite these results, VP eventually hit a massive slump. They had a few decent results after this, including a semifinals finish at PGL Major Kraków, and a second place appearance at EPICENTER 2017.

=== 2018–present ===
At the ELEAGUE Major 2018, Virtus.pro went out in last place, losing 3 games and winning none. Following this, Virtus.pro ended the longest standing roster in CS:GO history by replacing Wiktor "TaZ" Wojtas with Michał "MICHU" Müller. Him and NEO had been playing together for 12 years by this point. Despite this, Virtus.pro would continue their slump, and NEO was replaced in February. His individual form continued to drop off since 2017, but he was signed by FaZe Clan, replacing Dauren "AdreN" Kystaubayev. FaZe needed an In-Game Leader, and NEO had previously been one of the IGLs for Virtus.pro. With FaZe, NEO came second at BLAST Pro Series: Los Angeles, but at the major, he would once again exit in the group stage. His trial with FaZe Clan eventually came to an end, and his contract was not renewed. Before IEM Cologne 2023 FaZe's long time coach, "Robert "RobbaN" Dahlström" surprisingly decided to quit coaching. FaZe then registered NEO as their full time coach. After a coaching stint that saw FaZe reach three Major finals in Copenhagen, Shanghai and Budapest as well as winning four S-tier tournaments, NEO would part ways with FaZe on 16 March 2026, following poor results to start the year.

== Notable Results ==
Bold denotes a CS:GO Major

Placement	Tournament	Location	Date
Counter-Strike
With Pentagram G-Shock
1st place, gold medalist(s)	World Cyber Games 2006	Monza, Italy	2006-10-18 – 2006-10-22
3rd place, bronze medalist(s)	CPL Winter 2006	Dallas, United States	2006-12-16 – 2006-12-20
1st place, gold medalist(s)	IEM I	Hannover, Germany	2007-03-15 – 2007-03-21
1st place, gold medalist(s)	ESWC 2007	Paris, France	2007-07-03 – 2007-07-08
With MeetYourMakers
1st place, gold medalist(s)	Dreamhack Summer 2008	Jönköping, Sweden	2008-06-15 – 2008-06-17
1st place, gold medalist(s)	ESWC 2008	San Jose, California, United States	2008-08-24 – 2008-08-27
2nd place, silver medalist(s)	IEM III	Hannover, Germany	2009-03-06 – 2009-03-08
With AGAiN (2009)
1st place, gold medalist(s)	World Cyber Games 2009	Chengdu, China	2009-11-11 – 2009-11-15
With Frag eXecutors
4th	ESWC 2010	Paris, France	2010-06-30 – 2010-07-04
1st place, gold medalist(s)	World eSports Games: e-Stars 2010	Seoul, South Korea	2010-08-13 – 2010-08-15
2nd place, silver medalist(s)	IEM V	Hannover, Germany	2011-03-01 – 2011-03-05
1st place, gold medalist(s)	World eSports Games: e-Stars 2011	Seoul, South Korea	2011-08-18 – 2011-08-20
1st place, gold medalist(s)	Samsung European Championship 2011	Warsaw, Poland	2011-10-07 – 2011-10-09
With AGAiN (2011)
4th	ESWC 2011- CS 1.6	Paris, France	2011-10-20 – 2011-10-25
With ESC Gaming
1st place, gold medalist(s)	World Cyber Games 2011	Busan, South Korea	2011-12-08 – 2011-12-11
1st place, gold medalist(s)	IEM VI	Hannover, Germany	2012-03-06 – 2012-03-10
Counter-Strike: Global Offensive
With ESC Gaming
1st place, gold medalist(s)	StarLadder StarSeries IV	Kyiv, Ukraine	2012-12-20 – 2012-12-23
With AGAiN (2013)
1st place, gold medalist(s)	StarLadder StarSeries VIII	Kyiv, Ukraine	2013-12-20 – 2012-12-23
With Virtus.pro
1st place, gold medalist(s)	**EMS One Katowice 2014**	Katowice, Poland	2014-03-13 – 2014-03-16
2nd place, silver medalist(s)	Copenhagen Games 2014	Copenhagen, Denmark	2014-04-16 – 2014-04-20
1st place, gold medalist(s)	FACEIT Spring League 2014	N/A	2014-04-30 – 2014-06-01
1st place, gold medalist(s)	Gfinity G3	London, United Kingdom	2014-08-02 – 2014-08-03
3rd place, bronze medalist(s)	**Dreamhack Winter 2014**	Jönköping, Sweden	2014-11-27 – 2014-11-29
3rd place, bronze medalist(s)	**ESL One Katowice 2015**	Katowice, Poland	2015-03-12 – 2015-03-15
1st place, gold medalist(s)	Copenhagen Games 2015	Copenhagen, Denmark	2015-04-01 – 2015-04-05
1st place, gold medalist(s)	ESEA Season 18 Finals	Dallas, United States	2015-04-17 – 2015-04-19
2nd place, silver medalist(s)	Gfinity Spring Masters 2	London, United Kingdom	2015-05-15 – 2015-05-17
1st place, gold medalist(s)	CEVO Season 7 Finals	Columbus, United States	2015-04-24 – 2015-07-26
3rd place, bronze medalist(s)	ESL One Cologne 2015	Cologne, Germany	2015-08-20 – 2015-08-23
1st place, gold medalist(s)	ESL ESEA Pro League Invitational	Dubai, United Arab Emirates	2015-09-10 – 2015-09-12
2nd place, silver medalist(s)	PGL CS:GO Championship Series Season 1: Finals	Bucharest, Romania	2015-10-02 – 2015-10-04
1st place, gold medalist(s)	CEVO Season 8 Finals	Columbus, United States	2015-08-16 – 2015-11-08
1st place, gold medalist(s)	StarLadder i-League Invitational #1	Kyiv, Ukraine	2016-05-19 – 2016-05-22
3rd place, bronze medalist(s)	**ESL One Cologne 2016**	Cologne, Germany	2016-07-05 – 2016-07-10
1st place, gold medalist(s)	ELEAGUE Season 1	Atlanta, United States	2016-05-24 – 2016-07-30
1st place, gold medalist(s)	DreamHack Open Bucharest 2016	Bucharest, Romania	2016-09-16 – 2016-09-18
2nd place, silver medalist(s)	ESL One: New York 2016	New York, United States	2016-09-30 – 2016-10-02
2nd place, silver medalist(s)	EPICENTER 2016	Moscow, Russia	2016-10-17 – 2016-10-23
2nd place, silver medalist(s)	**ELEAGUE Major 2017**	Atlanta, United States	2017-01-22 – 2017-01-29
1st place, gold medalist(s)	DreamHack Masters Las Vegas 2017	Las Vegas, United States	2017-02-15 – 2017-02-19
1st place, gold medalist(s)	Adrenaline Cyber League 2017	Moscow, Russia	2017-06-18
3rd place, bronze medalist(s)	**PGL Major Kraków 2017**	Kraków, Poland	2017-07-16 – 2017-07-23
2nd place, silver medalist(s)	EPICENTER 2017	Saint Petersburg, Russia	2017-10-24 – 2017-10-29
2nd place, silver medalist(s)	StarLadder i-League Invitational #2	Shanghai, China	2017-11-02 – 2017-11-05
2nd place, silver medalist(s)	V4 Future Sports Festival - Budapest 2018	Budapest, Hungary	2018-03-23 – 2018-03-25
2nd place, silver medalist(s)	CS:GO Asia Championships 2018	Shanghai, China	2018-06-14 – 2018-06-18
With FaZe Clan
2nd place, silver medalist(s)	BLAST Pro Series: Los Angeles 2019	Los Angeles, United States	2019-07-13 – 2019-07-14

== Personal Awards ==
- eSports Player of the Year: 2007, 2008
- HLTV player of the decade
- HLTV top 20: #7 of 2010, #1 of 2011, #15 of 2015

== See also ==
- Wiktor "TaZ" Wojtas, fellow "Golden Five" teammate.
