= Sgares =

American electronic sports player

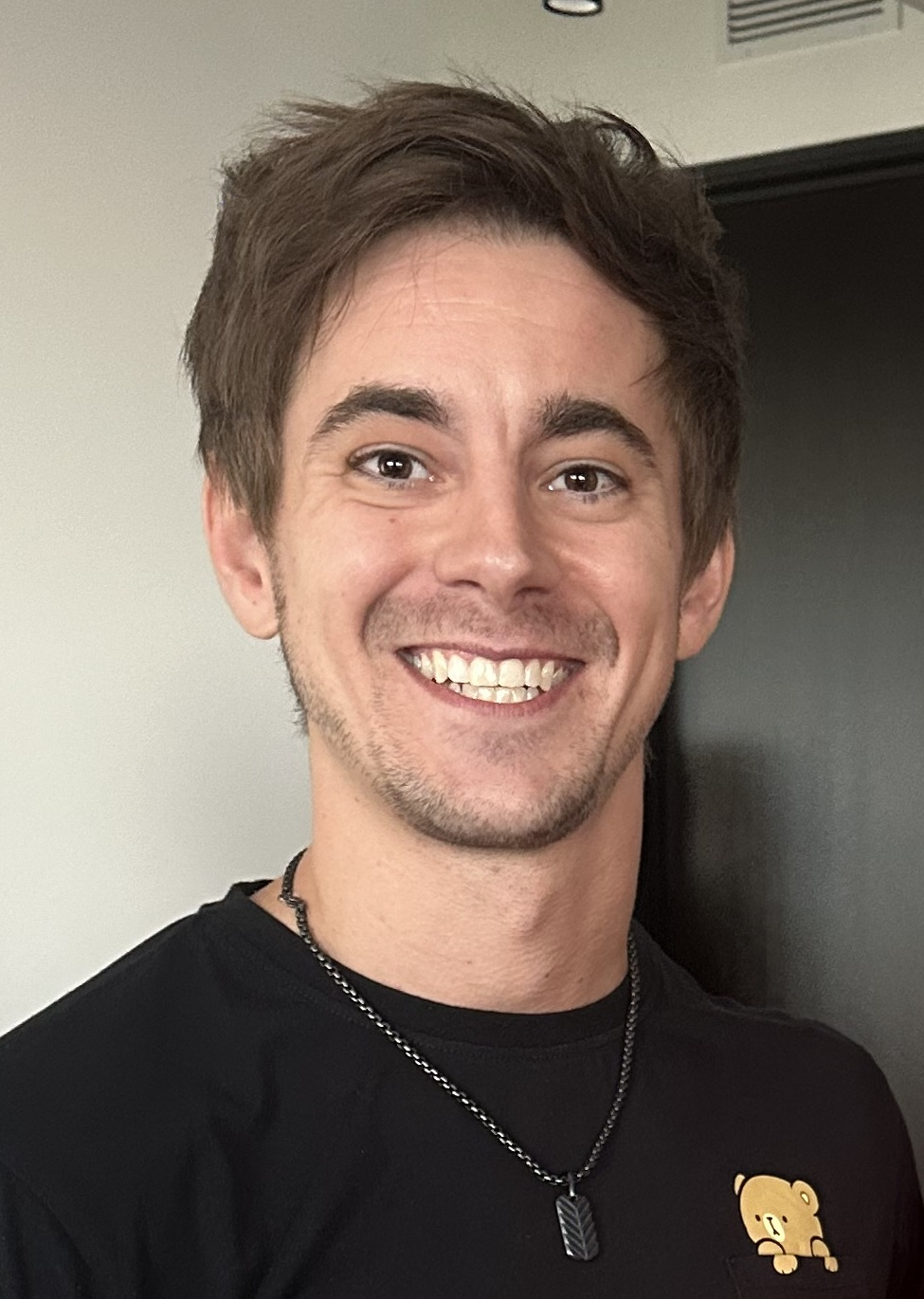
- Sgares in October 2024

Personal information
- Name: Sean Michael Gares
- Born: June 10, 1988 (age 38); Metairie, Louisiana, U.S.
- Nationality: American

Current team
- Team: 100 Thieves
- Role: Head of FPS

Career information
- Games: Counter-Strike 2 Counter-Strike: Global Offensive; Valorant
- Playing career: 2009–2019
- Coaching career: 2022

Team history

As player:
- 2009–2010: Emazing Gaming
- 2012: Maximum Effort
- 2013–2014: Complexity Gaming
- 2014–2015: Cloud9
- 2016: Echo Fox
- 2016: Team SoloMid
- 2017–2018: Misfits Gaming
- 2018–2019: Old Guys Club

As coach:
- 2022: 100 Thieves

Sean Michael Gares (born June 10, 1988), better known as sgares or Seang@res, is an American content creator, esports commentator, and former professional Counter-Strike: Global Offensive player. He currently works for 100 Thieves as the Head of FPS. In December 2016, he was released from TSM for supporting an open letter against the Professional Esports Association and played for Misfits between January 2017 and January 2018.

== Early life ==
Gares graduated from Arizona State University with a bachelor's degree in medical biochemistry. He joined his first professional team Emazing Gaming in 2009.

== Career ==
Starting from local Arizona teams before 2010, when he joined Ruins, Gares distinguished himself for being one of the most aggressive AWPers in North America. During his tenure in Ruins, the team was undefeated and won ESEA-M, moving up to ESEA-I.

Gares played at Arbalet Cup in Dallas placing in Group B with SK Gaming, mTw and lions. Ruins began to have internal problems after the tournament, so Gares moved to Loaded in early August of that year, whose captain and in-game leader (IGL) was ex-Evil Geniuses Nazar "steno" Vynnytsky. Vynnytsky's would introduce IGL'ing to Gares's life.

In October of the same year, the roster was acquired by Damage Incorporated (DiNC). Composed by Sean Gares, Steno, Paul "pauLy" Guerboyan, Scott "evolution" Cavallero and Liridon "quas" Ademaj, the team's first challenge was IEM V NYC. The team did great and finished 3rd losing to EG in the semi-final. In early 2011, Nazar "steno" Vynnytsky left the team and Gares went on to join Full Gaming as an IGL with his former teammate from Ruins Kory "Semphis" Friesen, and the new talent in NA, Braxton "swag" Pierce.

They would play together ESEA Invite Season 9 with Full Gaming where they would finish 2nd. Gares then joined Back2Back in 2012, with Kory "Semphis" Friesen, Brennan "ele1Nt" Webster, Jordan "n0thing" Gilbert and Braxton "swag" Pierce. With Gares being the IGL, this team won ESEA Invite Season 10 and would win ESEA Invite Season 11 under the name Maximum Effort.

Gares gained fame when Counter Strike: Global Offensive came out in 2012. He joined Area 51 in early August 2012 with Sam "DaZeD" Marine, former CS: Source player; Spencer "Hiko" Martin, Semphis, and Josh "PineKone" O'Connor. They would win the ESWC 2012 Na Qualifier, the first CSGO tournament they played. After swapping Pinekone with Trey "tck" Martin they would play ESWC 2012 where they would lose to VeryGames and finish 3rd. They would later win ESEA Invite Season 12. Gares and his teammates moved to team 4Nothing for 1 month and then to Lurking and Working. After 4 months and some roster changes, in May 2013 they were acquired by Quantic Gaming and in August they moved to Complexity Gaming with a roster including Spencer "Hiko" Martin, Braxton "swag" Pierce, Jordan "n0thing" Gilbert, Kory "Semphis" Frieson. This team had many impressive finishes, including a 3rd-4th-place finish at Dreamhack Winter 2013, the first ever CS:GO Major. Complexity was then considered the best Counter-Strike team in North America. However, losing Pierce cost them that title. He was replaced by Todd "anger" Williams. This team remained a close second. In the summer of 2014, Cloud9 acquired the Complexity roster. They dropped Williams and acquired Mike "shroud" Grzesiek. Martin was disappointed with the team's lackluster results and left the team in January 2015, replaced by Shahzeb "ShahZam" Khan.

Things went pretty poorly until iBUYPOWER was banned in March 2015. This left Cloud9 as the best in North America. Cloud9 replaced Khan and Friesen with Ryan "fREAKAZOiD" Abadir and Tyler "Skadoodle" Latham. This was Gares' most famous lineup as in-game leader and captain of Cloud9. With his strong ability to read the enemy and anti-strategize, he led his team to the ESL ESEA Pro League Season Finals, Faceit 2015 stage 2 and the Electronic Sports World Cup 2015. Cloud9 then won almost every event in North America, acquiring a huge fan base. The team's performances dropped off over the year until Gares left the team in November 2015, announcing that he would take a break. However, in January 2016 he returned to the game with his new team Echo Fox made up of A2z, Moe, Tck, and Ryx. In April the roster would improve by swapping A2z, Moe, and Tck for Freakazoid, ShaZham, and Roca. This team qualified for the 2 million dollars E-League on TBS. Later that year in October EchoFox showed poor performance at ELeague Season 2 and got offered to leave the organization and pursue other offers.

In December 2016 Gares signed with TSM but was fired from the team just a week later over his support of an open letter against the Professional Esports Association. TSM's CS:GO roster ultimately disbanded in January 2017, with the organization citing its deteriorating relationship with its remaining players and the latter's desire to continue playing with Gares. A day after the split, Gares and the rest of the former TSM CS:GO roster were signed by Misfits Gaming. The team would play qualifiers, DreamHack Las Vegas, and IBuypower Invitational 2017- Spring.

In April they swapped Twistzz and Relyks for AmaneK and Devoduvek, 2 players from France, chosen by Gares mainly because of stats in HLTV. The team saw a lot of improvement, finishing 10th in ESL Pro League Season 5, qualifying for the Eleague Boston Major in 2018 and finishing in the top 4 in ESL Pro League Season 6.

In 2018, Gares competed as a member of team Old Guys Club.

In March 2022, Gares joined 100 Thieves as the head coach for their Valorant division. He later departed the role in order to focus on his family.

On May 16, 2025, Gares published a video to his X account, claiming that the second tier of the Valorant professional scene was rife with match-fixing.

On November 12, 2025, Gares returned to 100 Thieves as the Head of FPS, primarily working for their Valorant and Counter-Strike 2 divisions.

== Tournament results ==
=== compLexity Gaming ===
- 3–4th — 2013 DreamHack Counter-Strike: Global Offensive Championship

=== Cloud9 ===
- 9–12th — DreamHack Open Cluj-Napoca 2015
- 5–8th — ESL One Cologne 2014

=== Echo Fox ===
- 17th–22nd — ELeague Season 1
- 17th–22nd — ELeague Season 2
