= World Cyber Games 2006 =

The World Cyber Games 2006 was held from October 18 to October 22, 2006 in Monza, Italy.

== Official games ==
=== PC games ===
- FIFA Soccer 2006
- Counter-Strike 1.6
- Need For Speed: Most Wanted
- StarCraft: Brood War
- Warcraft III: The Frozen Throne
- Dawn of War: Winter Assault

=== Xbox games ===
- Dead or Alive 4
- Project Gotham Racing 3

=== Special tournament game ===
- PangYa

=== Invitational tournament game ===
- Carom 3D
- Quake 4 (All Stars)

== Results ==
=== Official ===
| Event | Gold | | Silver | | Bronze | |
| FIFA Soccer 2006 | (Germany) Daniel Schellhase (SK|hero) | | (Romania) Ovidiu Patrascu (Eq-ovvy) | | (Russia) Victor Gusev (x4-alexx) | |
| Counter-Strike | PGS (Poland) | Jakub Gurczyński (kuben) | NiP (Sweden) | Oskar Holm (ins) | hoorai (Finland) | Juuso Sajakoski (contE) |
| Counter-Strike | PGS (Poland) | Lukasz Wnęk (LUq) | NiP (Sweden) | Abdisamad Mohamed (SpawN) | hoorai (Finland) | Niko Kovanen (naSu) |
| Counter-Strike | PGS (Poland) | Wiktor Wojtas (Taz) | NiP (Sweden) | Marcus Sundström (zet) | hoorai (Finland) | Toni Luhtapuro (toNppa) |
| Counter-Strike | PGS (Poland) | Mariusz Cybulski (Loord) | NiP (Sweden) | Robert Dahlström (RobbaN) | hoorai (Finland) | Tomi Kovanen (lurppis) |
| Counter-Strike | PGS (Poland) | Filip Kubski (neo) | NiP (Sweden) | Dennis Wallenberg (walle) | hoorai (Finland) | Max Oskari Aspe (ruuit) |
| Need For Speed | (Russia) Alan Enileev (Alan) | | (Russia) Nikolay Frontov (USSRxMrRASER) | | (Netherlands) Steffan Amende (Steffan) | |
| StarCraft: Brood War | (South Korea) Yun-Sung Choi (iloveoov) | | (South Korea) Sung-Joon Park (JulyZerg) | | (South Korea) Jeon Sang-wook (midas[gm]) | |
| Warcraft III: The Frozen Throne | (China) Li Xiaofeng (WE/Sky) | | (France) Yoan Merlo (4K^ToD) | | (Ukraine) Mykhaylo Novopashyn (SK|HoT) | |
| Dawn of War: Winter Assault | (South Korea) Kyung-Hyun Ryoo (SeleCT) | | (Brazil) Gregorio Costa (DeathGun) | | (Germany) Karsten Hager (sCa_Phoenix) | |
| Dead or Alive 4 | (Canada) Ryan Ward (Offbeat_Ninja) | | (Mexico) Israel Navidad (DIVINO_XMAS) | | (France) Stephane Maine (arngrine) | |
| Project Gotham Racing 3 | (United States) Wesley Cwiklo (TTR_Ch0mpr) | | (Sweden) Christopher Hogfeldt (TTR_Mclaren_F1) | | (Finland) Erno Kuronen (TTR_FinPro) | |

=== Special ===
| Event | Gold | Silver | Bronze |
| PangYa | (South Korea) Jae-Heum Rhim (COR_임제흠) | (South Korea) Suk-Joung Kim (COR_김석중) | (Japan) Naoto Chiba (JPN_NAOTO) |

=== Invitational ===
| Event | Gold | Silver | Bronze |
| Carom 3D | ? | ? | ? |
| Quake 4 (All Stars) | (Sweden) Johan Quick (Toxic) | (United States) Jason Sylka (Socrates_) | (Italy) Alessandro Avallone (Stermy) |
