= MeetYourMakers =

Defunct German esports organization

- Short name: MYM, mYm
- Founded: 2001
- Location: Germany, Denmark (former)

MeetYourMakers (MYM or mYm) was a German professional esports organization founded in Denmark in 2001. It formerly had teams competing in Warcraft III, Counter-Strike: Global Offensive, League of Legends, Dota 2, Hearthstone, Battlefield 4, StarCraft II and PlayerUnknown's Battlegrounds.

== History ==
Founded in Denmark by Mark and Peter "Mercy" Fries in 2000, the organization was not officially established publicly until 2001. In 2002, the decision was made to turn MeetYourMakers into a professional esports organization.

MeetYourMakers was well known for its Warcraft III team, having signed players such as Grubby and Moon.

In 2008 MeetYourMakers acquired the "Golden Five" Polish Counter-Strike players: Wiktor "TaZ" Wojtas, Filip "NEO" Kubski, Łukasz "LUq" Wnęk, Mariusz "loord" Cybulski, and Jakub "Kuben" Gurczyński. MeetYourMakers parted ways with their WarCraft III team in 2009, due to financial difficulties.

The organization was sold to an investor in June 2012, and has since been based in Germany.

After the dissolution of their previous League of Legends team, MeetYourMakers acquired EU LCS team Supa Hot Crew on 8 December 2014, playing in the league until it disbanded in mid-2015.

In July 2015, MeetYourMakers was embroiled in controversy after the team's manager threatened to take Marcin "Kori" Wolski's house away as a consequence of him leaving the team.

The organization was dissolved in June 2020. In August 2022, the company was dissolved.
