= Ninjas in Pyjamas =

Swedish esports organisation

- Short name: NIP, NiP
- Teams: Counter-Strike 2; Rainbow Six Siege; Valorant; FIFA; League of Legends; Rocket League; Mobile Legends: Bang Bang
- Founded: 2000; 2012 (reform)
- Based in: Stockholm
- Location: Sweden
- Colours: Neon Yellow, Black, Grey, White, Sky Blue
- CEO: Hicham Chahine
- Partners: Red Bull, Rainbet, Fila, BYD Auto, Chiliz
- Parent group: NIP Group
- Website: nip.gl

Ninjas in Pyjamas (often abbreviated to NIP and NiP) is a professional esports organisation based in Sweden that is best known for its Counter-Strike teams. In 2012, the team reformed with a Counter Strike: Global Offensive lineup upon the release of the game. Aside from Counter-Strike, the organisation has teams in Valorant, Rainbow Six Siege, FIFA, Rocket League, Apex Legends, Fortnite Battle Royale and League of Legends. They formerly had teams in Overwatch, PlayerUnknown's Battlegrounds and Paladins.

== History ==
Ninjas in Pyjamas were formed in June 2000. Their biggest success was winning the 2001 Cyberathlete Professional League World Championships after an extremely close final with X3 (a forerunner to Team 3D). Ninjas in Pyjamas struggled to find a sponsor, and as a result, joined the prominent esports organization SK Gaming and were known by the names SK Scandinavia and later SK Sweden. At SK, they continued their success. The prize money from their tournament victories in 2003 totalled approximately US$170,000, and every CPL event that year.

Feeling they could secure a larger share of sponsorship money, the team left SK in early 2005. Later in the year, some members returned to SK Gaming, forcing NIP to replace them.

Emil Christensen with Tommy Ingemarsson, Managing Directors Peter Hedlund and Victor Lindqvist reformed NIP as a Swedish limited liability company in 2005, due to problems with SK. NIP continued to participate in international tournaments, placing high in many events. They signed some of the biggest sponsorship deals in the scene at that time. The team received about 100,000 members on their website in Europe during their first two years and was also the first team outside of Asia to enter the Asian market. Within six months, they had about 90,000 members on their Asian website. The team was among the most outspoken opponents to the change from the original version of Counter-Strike to the newer Counter-Strike: Source.

On 13 November 2015, NIP parted ways with its Dota 2 team, consisting of Elias 'Sealkid' Merta, Jonas 'Jonassomfan' Lindholm, Adrian 'Era' Kryeziu, Simon 'Handsken' Haag and Linus 'Limmp' Blomdin. The cited reason was disappointment over recent performances, as the team had failed to qualify for both The International 2015 and Frankfurt Major.

Since then, NIP have had two Dota 2 teams, one formed in 2017 that disbanded later that year, as well as another which formed in 2018. Christopher "GeT RiGhT" Alesund, one of the original 2012 NIP roster, left after the StarLadder Major Berlin 2019, being replaced by Simon "twist" Eliasson, a former player for Fnatic, leaving f0rest as the only remaining member of the original roster (until he left in 2020 to return to the 2014 NIP roster on Dignitas).

In July 2020, it was announced that NIP would be merging with Chinese esports organization Victory Five and enter the Chinese League of Legends scene by participating in the League of Legends Pro League (LPL). The merger was officially completed in January 2023, and Ninjas in Pyjamas debuted in LPL on 15 January 2023, against Ultra Prime with Xiao-Bing "Invincible" Li as toplaner, Xiao-Long "XLB" Li as jungler, Wen-Xiang "Dream" Tan as midlaner, Qi-Shen "Photic" Ying as AD Carry and Xu-Zhuo "Zhuo" Wang as support. For their first split in LPL, the team finished 13th out of 17 teams, with 5 wins and 11 losses.

Ninjas in Pyjamas started to compete on Valorant in April 2020 by re-signing their former Paladins 2019 world champions roster. However, that first roster did not last long, and in July 2020 the organization announced a completely revamped roster made of former Counter-Strike: Global Offensive pros CREA, Fearoth, luckeRRR and Rhyme as well as former Overwatch pro HyP. The organization did not meet a lot of success and over the course of the next two years, many players came and left. This led to the decision, in January 2022, to quit the European scene, and instead invest into a Brazilian team.

The team failed to get into the Riot games partnership program in September 2022, thus leaving Ninjas in Pyjamas without a VCT spot. Following this, NIP announced they would drop their male roster and instead compete in VCT Game Changers, Valorant's female scene. The first three players were announced in early January 2023 and the roster was fully completed and announced as Ninjas in Pyjamas Lightning team in April 2023.

Ninjas in Pyjamas won RLCS 2022-23 - Winter: South America Regional 3 - Winter Invitational.

On 6 May 2024, the Esports World Cup Foundation, funded by the Saudi Arabia Public Investment Fund and organizers of the Esports World Cup tournament series, announced the 30 organizations (known in the ESWC as Clubs) who would make up the Club Support Program, with NIP being one of them. This program gives teams a one-time six-figure stipend if an organization is willing to enter new esports, as well as additional funding each year if they drive viewership and fan engagement to the Esports World Cup.

== Rosters ==
Ninjas in Pyjamas rosters

Counter-Strike 2
| Handle | Name | Nationality |
|---|---|---|
| sjuush | Beck, Rasmus | Denmark |
| Krimbo | Moussa, Karim | Germany |
| xKacpersky | Gabara, Kacper | Poland |
| stavn | Lund, Martin | Denmark |
| adamb | Ångström, Adam | Sweden |

Rainbow Six Siege
| Handle | Name | Nationality |
|---|---|---|
| Kondz | Romão, Raul | Brazil |
| Psycho | Rigal, Gustavo | Brazil |
| Fntzy | Dutra, Diego | Brazil |
| Hatez | Kobuszewski, Gabriel | Brazil |
| pino | Fernandes, Gabriel | Brazil |

Apex Legends
| Handle | Name | Nationality |
|---|---|---|
| Vein | Hobbs, Nicholas | United States |
| Cole | Wilson, Cole | United States |
| Kurev | Riffel, Matias | Argentina |

Rocket League
| Handle | Name | Nationality |
|---|---|---|
| crr | Fernández Raigal, Cristian | Spain |
| Joreuz | Robben, Joris | Netherlands |
| oaly. | van Doorn, Ole | Netherlands |

FIFA
| Handle | Name | Nationality |
|---|---|---|
| Ollelito | Arbin, Olle | Sweden |

League of Legends
| Handle | Name | Nationality |
|---|---|---|
| Shanji | Deng, Zi-Jian | China |
| Leyan | Lu, Jue | China |
| Aki | Mao, An | China |
| Rookie | Song, Eui-Jin | South Korea |
| Photic | Ying, Qi-Shen | China |
| Zhuo | Wang, Xu-Zhuo | China |
| Zero | Yoon, Kyung-Sup | South Korea |

Fortnite
| Handle | Name | Nationality |
|---|---|---|
| Refsgaard | Refsgaard, Oscar | Denmark |

Legend:
- (I) Inactive
- (S) Suspended
- (L) On loan
- (2W) Two-way player
- Substitute
- (injured) Injury / Illness

Awards and achievements
| Preceded by EMS One Katowice 2014; Virtus.pro | ESL One Cologne 2014 winner 2014 | Succeeded by DreamHack Winter 2014; Team LDLC.com |
| Preceded by Spacestation Gaming | Six Invitational winner 2021 | Succeeded by TSM |
