= Warcraft III in esports =

Expansion to Warcraft III

The expansion to the computer game Warcraft III: Reign of Chaos, known as The Frozen Throne, had an active professional competition scene, particularly in China, Germany, and South Korea. The game was featured at eSports festivals including the World Cyber Games, the Electronic Sports World Cup, the World e-Sports Games, the World Series of Video Games and the International E-Sports Festival. Outside of the professional circuit, the game had many active competitive circuits, with users at Battle.net ranging between 70,000 and 100,000 at any given moment. In China, in which Warcraft III was extremely popular due to it being easily available through piracy, fans and users often used an alternative client due to the country's poor internet connections to the outside world. Around 3,000,000 copies of the game were sold in the country. 500,000 Chinese competed in the Chinese qualifiers for the 2006 World Cyber Games. The amount of prize money through the years has been significant with top players winning hundreds of thousands of dollars. As usual in competitive gaming, income for Warcraft III professional players flowed from various sources like team salaries from pro-gaming teams and sponsorships usually computer technology related. A famous example was the Danish gaming organization known as Meet Your Makers which boasted of paying their players US$300,000 on an annual basis. Similar to older games with huge competitive scenes like StarCraft: Brood War and Counter-Strike 1.6, the popularity of Warcraft III steadily declined and towards the end of the previous decade almost all tournaments and players were Chinese. After 2010, with StarCraft II, League of Legends, and Dota 2 being released and becoming popular, Warcraft III gave up its position as one of the prime eSports titles.

== Professional Warcraft III players ==
- Sky — Li Xiaofeng

Li Xiaofeng won the 2005 and 2006 World Cyber Games representing China, regarded as Warcraft III's premier individual competition, his victories earned him a massive fanbase and turned him into an icon of China's professional gaming scene on a national and international level. He was recognized as the Warcraft III player of 2006 by competitive gaming media and is a member of the World Cyber Games hall of fame. He is known for revolutionizing the way the Human race is played in Warcraft III and has been considered the top player of the race alongside Frenchman Yoan Merlo since 2005. He has been considered China's number one player since the country's emergence as a major supporter of professional Warcraft III. He has been signed with Chinese based World Elite throughout his professional career.

- ToD — Yoan Merlo

He is one of the most successful Warcraft III players ever, holding among other achievements first places at the World e-Sports Games, Blizzard Worldwide Invitational and Cyberathlete Professional League competitions. He is also a World Cyber Games silver and bronze medalist. He was recognized as the Warcraft III player of 2007.

- Infi — Wang Xuwen

Wang Xuwen started gaining recognition in international in team World Elite. In 2007, he won the International E-Sports Festival 2007 and became the first non-Korean champion in this tournament and also the first non-Korean champion in a tournament which was held in Korea. From 2007 to 2010, he got many Champions of premier tournaments. He won KODE5 in Moscow and World e-Sports Games in 2008. He was also the champion of World Cyber Games 2009 representing China and the runner-up of the BlizzCon Season VIII. He was considered one of the best Human player in the world. In team World Elite, he helped World Elite get the champion of Warcraft III Champions League Season XIV. Wang Xuwen has the nickname "Tower Race" or "the Six Race". It is because he always builds many towers to defense and offensive.

- TH000 — Huang Xiang

Huang Xiang is a Chinese Human player. He is one of the best Human players after 2008 and also one of the best random players. He used Undead and Night Elf in premier individual or team competitions and also used Orc in some tournaments. He also created many tactics for Human, Undead and Night Elf. From 2008 to 2011, Chinese Warcraft III was dominated by 4 players, Lu "Fly100%" Weiliang, Li "Sky" Xiaofeng, Wang "infi" Xuwen and Huang "TH000" Xiang. They were considered the 4 kings in Chinese Warcraft III. He won ZOTAC Cup 16 times. He was the back to back champion of ProGamer League and the champion of World e-Sports Games 2010 and Cyberathlete Professional League 2011. He also got bronze medals of the International E-Sports Festival two times. He is the last Warcraft III champion of World Cyber Games.

- Grubby — Manuel Schenkhuizen

Schenkhuizen won the 2004 and 2008 World Cyber Games representing The Netherlands and has been considered the western world's premier Warcraft III player ever since. He is known for his strength in international competition winning such tournaments as the 2005 Electronic Sports World Cup and the 2006 World Series of Video Games. He was signed with British based Four Kings, until the team's 2008 dissolution. Schenkhuizen has been a key player throughout his professional career. The Four Kings Warcraft III team was recognized as the 2005 eSport Team of the Year. Individually he has been recognized as Warcraft III player of 2005, 2006 and the eSports Player of 2006. Known as the "Orc Emperor" in televised leagues, he has been considered one of the world's best players.

- Lyn — Park June

Park June is a Korean Orc player. He is the only player who won almost all of the premier tournaments which include World Cyber Games, Electronic Sports World Cup, Battle.Net and Intel Extreme Masters. For Intel Extreme Master, he got the champion of Global Challenge in Los Angeles in 2007 and World Championship in 2008. The only two premier tournaments which he has never won are the World e-Sports Games and International E-Sports Festival, but he has won the silver medal of the World e-Sports Games in 2008 and 2010, and the silver medal of the International E-Sports Festival in 2007. He helped the team World Elite win the Warcraft III Champions League Season XI. He was the first top player to use the Blade Master as the race's core hero and collect low price items to increase the skills of the Blade Master.

- Fly100% — Lu Weiliang

Lu Weiliang is a Chinese Orc player. He is considered one of the best Orc players and is one of the professional players of Warcraft III with the longest careers. Liu Weiliang began his professional e-sports career in team Hacker and started gaining international recognition after joining the Mousesports. From 2008 to 2009, he won multiple tournaments like the International E-Sports Festival 2009, ProGamer League IV, Electronic Sports World Cup Asian master and Intel Extreme Masters Global Challenge 2010. Lu Weiliang reached the grand final of World Cyber Games in 2009 and World Cyber Games 2012, placing second both times, and won the bronze medal in WCG 2011. He also placed second in the Warcraft III Champions League Season XV and NGL One season III in Mousesports.

- Moon — Jang Jae-ho

Jang is known for his domination of televised competition in South Korea since Reign of Chaos, he won six televised leagues and the last five seasons of the ongoing MBCGame World War series. He has won over 200,000 USD in prize money since 2005 and reportedly earns 9,000 USD in monthly salary. He currently plays for the Korea-based team WeMade FOX and resides in South Korea. Widely considered the world's best Night Elf player, Moon has been a top contender in the professional circuit for many years. Known for his inventive playstyle and popularizing of many Night Elf strategies, Moon has been nicknamed "The Fifth Race".

- Sweet — Chun Jung Hee

Chun has been recognized among the top Warcraft III players since the beginning of the professional competitive scene and has won two world championships as well as several professional events in South Korea. Sweet's lengthy career includes being recognized as the Warcraft III Player of 2004, winning the 3rd edition of the World e-Sports Games and the 2nd edition of the Blizzard Worldwide Invitational. Sweet was the first Korean to move to China to compete as a member of the China-based Beijing eSport Team [BeT].

- MaDFroG — Fredrik Johansson

Johansson was a dominating Warcraft III player from 2003 till 2004 and is regarded as an icon of professional gaming. He was the runner-up of the 2003 Electronic Sports World Cup representing Sweden and following this tournament travelled to Seoul, South Korea to compete in the country's televised leagues. He stayed there for eleven months in which he won the first Blizzard Worldwide Invitational and joined a Korean professional gaming team. Upon his return to Europe, he became the runner-up of the 2004 Electronic Sports World Cup and was recognized as the eSports Player of 2004. After briefly playing StarCraft II upon its release in July 2010, MaDFrog is no longer active as a professional gamer.

== Warcraft III World Championships ==
There have been various Warcraft III world championships, see Warcraft III World Championships for an overview.

== Korean Warcraft III Championships ==
Due to the intensely competitive nature of Korean televised competition, the top tier tournaments are often considered on the same level as world championships, see Korean Warcraft III Championships for an overview of prominent Korean competitions.

== Professional Warcraft III squads ==
Various gaming teams have a professional Warcraft III squad. These squads represent their team in such leagues as the Warcraft III Champions League and the NGL One professional league. Players also represent their team in various individual leagues. This needs to be updated.

=== MeetYourMakers - Denmark ===
Meet Your Makers rose to prominence as one of Warcraft III strongest's teams after moving to an all Korean line-up in 2005 signing several players that lead the team until today such as JaeWook Noh, Jung-Ki Oh and Jang Jae Ho. They stopped a long era of Four Kings domination by winning Warcraft III Champions League IX in 2006 as well as the first season of the NGL One Professional League, becoming the only team to ever hold two major titles at the same time. Following the dissolution of Four Kings in 2008, they added longtime rival Manuel "Grubby" Schenkhuizen.

=== SK Gaming - Germany ===
SK Gaming has competed in high-level Warcraft III since 2002 and was considered the dominant western team of 2002-2003 (there was no offline competition between teams in those days nor international clashes between European and Asian teams). In 2007 SK Gaming defeated MeetYourMakers 3-1 in the WC3L offline championship after acquiring Kim Sung "Remind" Sik, Lee Sung "SoJu" Duk, and June "Lyn" Park.

=== World Elite - China ===
Upon its conception in 2005 World Elite signed a number of prominent Warcraft III players including Jung Chee Chun and LI Xiaofeng and the team was considered one of the world's absolute best right away. They have competed in various offline finals ever since and won the second season of the NGL-One Professional League 2007, making them the only team to win a major league next to Four Kings and Meet Your Makers since 2004. World Elite won two of the Warcraft III Champions League offline finals. In 2008, World Elite were recognized as the eSports Team of 2008 Nowadays the team is led by LI Xiaofeng.

== See also ==
- List of Warcraft III championships
- List of eSports players
