= List of Warcraft III championships =

This is a list of international competitive video-gaming championship events for Warcraft III: Reign of Chaos and Warcraft III: The Frozen Throne.

== Individual competitions ==
=== 2020 ===
	Gold	Silver	Bronze	4th
DreamHack Anaheim (United States) Anaheim	(South Korea) Jang "Moon" Jae Ho	(South Korea) Eom "FoCuS" Hyo Sub	(Ukraine) Andriy "Foggy" Koren (3rd-4th place)	(Russia) Dmitry "Happy" Kostin (3rd-4th place)

=== 2019 ===
	Gold	Silver	Bronze	4th
Warcraft Gold League Winter (China) Shanghai	(South Korea) Park "Lyn" Joon	(Russia) Dmitry "Happy" Kostin	(China) Xu "Romantic" Yuxing	(China) Huang "TH000" Xiang
NetEase Esports X Tournament Autumn (China) Foshan	(China) Wang "Infi" Xuwen	(South Korea) Jang "Moon" Jae Ho	(China) Huang "TH000" Xiang (3rd/4th place)	(China) Guo "eer0" Zixiang (3rd/4th place)
World Cyber Games (China) Xi'an	(China) Wang "Infi" Xuwen	(China) Huang "TH000" Xiang	(South Korea) Jang "Moon" Jae Ho	(Russia) Sergey "HawK" Shcherbakov
Warcraft Gold League Summer (China) Shanghai	(Russia) Dmitry "Happy" Kostin	(South Korea) Jang "Moon" Jae Ho	(China) Huang "TH000" Xiang (3rd/4th place)	(China) Guo "eer0" Zixiang (3rd/4th place)
NetEase Esports X Tournament Spring (China) Shanghai	(China) Huang "TH000" Xiang	(China) Wang "Infi" Xuwen	(China) Park "Lyn" Joon	(South Korea) Jang "Moon" Jae Ho
W-League (China) Shanghai	(China) Huang "TH000" Xiang	(South Korea) Jang "Moon" Jae Ho	(South Korea) Jo "LawLiet" Ju Yeon	(China) Guo "eer0" Zixiang
H & W China vs Korea Masters (China) Beijing	(South Korea) Jang "Moon" Jae Ho	(South Korea) Jo "LawLiet" Ju Yeon	(South Korea) Park "Lyn" Joon	(China) Guo "eer0" Zixiang
Warcraft Gold League 2018 Grand Finals (China) Beijing	(China) Wang "Infi" Xuwen	(China) Huang "TH000" Xiang	(China) Lai "Colorful" Yongyun	(China) Lu "Fly100%" Weiliang

=== 2018 ===
	Gold	Silver	Bronze	4th
Warcraft Gold League Winter (China) Shanghai	(South Korea) Jang "Moon" Jae Ho	(Ukraine) Andriy "Foggy" Koren	(China) Wang "Infi" Xuwen	(South Korea) Park "Lyn" Joon
Master's Coliseum (China) Shanghai	(China) Guo "eer0" Zixiang	(China) Wang "Infi" Xuwen	(South Korea) Park "Lyn" Joon (3rd/4th place)	(Ukraine) Andriy "Foggy" Koren (3rd/4th place)
Golden Championship Series Summer (China) Shanghai	(China) Huang "TH000" Xiang	(China) Lu "Fly100%" Weiliang	(China) Wang "Infi" Xuwen	(South Korea) Jo "LawLiet" Ju Yeon
Golden Championship Series 2017 Grand Finals (China) Shanghai	(China) Guo "eer0" Zixiang	(China) Huang "TH000" Xiang	(China) Xu "Romantic" Yuxing (3rd/4th place)	(China) Wang "Infi" Xuwen (3rd/4th place)

=== 2017 ===
	Gold	Silver	Bronze	4th
Golden Championship Series Winter (China) Shanghai	(China) Huang "TH000" Xiang	(Ukraine) Andriy "Foggy" Koren	(South Korea) Eom "FoCuS" Hyo Sub	(South Korea) Lee "Check" Hyung Joo
Golden Championship Series Summer (China) Shanghai	(China) Guo "eer0" Zixiang	(China) Wang "Infi" Xuwen	(Ukraine) Andriy "Foggy" Koren	(China) Xu "Romantic" Yuxing
Neo Star League Season 4 (China) Shanghai	(China) Huang "TH000" Xiang	(South Korea) Jang "Moon" Jae Ho	(South Korea) Kim "ReMinD" Sung Sik	(China) Wang "Infi" Xuwen
Gold Championship Series 2016 Grand Finals (China) Shanghai	(China) Lu "Fly100%" Weiliang	(China) Wu "WFZ" Fazhen	(China) Huang "TH000" Xiang	(China) Guo "eer0" Zixiang

=== 2016 ===
	Gold	Silver	Bronze	4th
Golden Championship Series Fall (China) Shanghai	(China) Guo "eer0" Zixiang	(South Korea) Park "Lyn" Joon	(Ukraine) Andriy "Foggy" Koren	(China) Huang "TH000" Xiang
World Cyber Arena (China) Yinchuan	(South Korea) Park "Lyn" Joon	(South Korea) Jo Ju "LawLiet" Yeon	(China) Huang "TH000" Xiang	(China) Yu "Yumiko" Jiankai
Pro-Gamer League (China) Wuhan	(South Korea) Jang "Moon" Jae Ho	(China) Huang "TH000" Xiang	(South Korea) Park "Lyn" Joon	(China) Lu "Fly100%" Weiliang
Golden Championship Series Spring (China) Shanghai	(China) Lu "Fly100%" Weiliang	(China) Guo "eer0" Zixiang	(South Korea) Jang "Moon" Jae Ho	(China) Wang "Infi" Xuwen
Golden Championship Series (China) Shanghai	(China) Wang "Infi" Xuwen	(China) Guo "eer0" Zixiang	(South Korea) Kim "ReMinD" Sung Sik	(South Korea) Jang "Moon" Jae Ho

=== 2015 ===
	Gold	Silver	Bronze	4th
PGL - Return of the Kings (China) Beijing	(China) Wang "Infi" Xuwen	(South Korea) Lee "Check" Hyung Joo	(China) Yu "Yumiko" Jiankai	(South Korea) Kim "ReMinD" Sung Sik
World Cyber Arena (China) Yinchuan	(China) Lu "Fly100%" Weiliang	(Germany) Marc "yAwS" Förster	(South Korea) Jo Ju "LawLiet" Yeon	(China) Huang "TH000" Xiang

=== 2014 ===
	Gold	Silver	Bronze	4th
World Cyber Arena (China) Yinchuan	(China) Wang "Infi" Xuwen	(China) Yu "Yumiko" Jiankai	(China) Lu "Fly100%" Weiliang	(China) Huang "TH000" Xiang
World E-sport Championships (China) Hangzhou	(China) Wang "Infi" Xuwen	(South Korea) Lee "ReprisaL" Jong Seok	(Russia) Sergey "HawK" Shcherbakov	(China) Yu "Yumiko" Jiankai

=== 2013 ===
	Gold	Silver	Bronze	4th
World Cyber Games (China) Kunshan	(China) Huang "TH000" Xiang	(South Korea) Jang "Moon" Jae Ho	(South Korea) Eom "FoCuS" Hyo Sub	(China) Ren "EleGaNt" Jingyang

=== 2012 ===
	Gold	Silver	Bronze	4th
World Cyber Games (China) Kunshan	(China) Zeng "TeD" Zhuo	(China) Lu "Fly100%" Weiliang	(China) Li "Sky" Xiaofeng	(South Korea) Jang "Moon" Jae Ho

=== 2011 ===
	Gold	Silver	Bronze	4th
World Cyber Games (South Korea) Busan	(South Korea) Park "Lyn" Joon	(China) Li "Sky" Xiaofeng	(China) Lu "Fly100%" Weiliang	(Russia) Sergey "HawK" Shcherbakov
International E-Sports Festival (South Korea) Yongin	(South Korea) Jang "Moon" Jae Ho	(South Korea) Park "Lyn" Joon	(China) Wang "Infi" Xuwen	(South Korea) Noh "Lucifer" Jae Wook

=== 2010 ===
	Gold	Silver	Bronze	4th
International E-Sports Festival (China) Wuhan	(China) Wang "Infi" Xuwen	(China) Lu "Fly100%" Weiliang	(China) Huang "TH000" Xiang	(Russia) Nikita "nicker" Pomadov
World Cyber Games (United States) Los Angeles	(South Korea) Kim "ReMinD" Sung Sik	(Netherlands) Manuel "Grubby" Schenkhuizen	(South Korea) Park "Lyn" Joon	(Russia) Nikita "nicker" Pomadov
World e-Sports Masters (China) Hangzhou	(China) Huang "TH000" Xiang	(South Korea) Park "Lyn" Joon	(China) Zeng "TeD" Zhuo	(South Korea) Kim "ReMinD" Sung Sik
Electronic Sports World Cup (France) Paris	(South Korea) Park "Lyn" Joon	(South Korea) Jang "Moon" Jae Ho	(South Korea) Kim "ReMinD" Sung Sik	(Russia) Dmitry "Happy" Kostin
Battle.Net Season VIII (BlizzCon) (United States) Anaheim	(South Korea) Kim "ReMinD" Sung Sik	(China) Wang "Infi" Xuwen	(South Korea) Jang "Moon" Jae Ho	(Netherlands) Manuel "Grubby" Schenkhuizen
e-Stars Seoul 2010 Kotg (South Korea) Seoul	(South Korea) Jang "Moon" Jae Ho	(Netherlands) Manuel "Grubby" Schenkhuizen	(South Korea) Park "Lyn" Joon	(Russia) Dmitry "Happy" Kostin
NGL-ONE Season 6 (Germany) Berlin	(South Korea) Jang "Moon" Jae Ho	(Netherlands) Manuel "Grubby" Schenkhuizen	(South Korea) Park "Lyn" Joon	(South Korea) Eom "FoCuS" Hyo Sub

=== 2009 ===
	Gold	Silver	Bronze	4th
International E-Sports Festival (South Korea) Suwon	(China) Lu "Fly100%" Weiliang	(China) Wang "Infi" Xuwen	(China) Huang "TH000" Xiang	(China) Zeng "TeD" Zhuo
PGL Championship Challenge (China) Beijing	(China) Li "Sky" Xiaofeng	(China) Lu"Fly100%" Weiliang	(China) Huang "TH000" Xiang	(South Korea) Lee "Check" Hyung Joo
Electronic Sports World Cup (South Korea) Cheonan	(Spain) Pedro "LucifroN" Moreno Duran	(South Korea) Park "Lyn" Joon	(China) Lu "Fly100%" Weiliang	(Russia) Dmitry "Happy" Kostin
World Cyber Games (China) Chengdu	(China) Wang "Infi" Xuwen	(China) Lu "Fly100%" Weiliang	(South Korea) Park "Lyn" Joon	(Russia) Dmitry "Happy" Kostin
International Electronic Sport Tournament (China) Beijing	(China) Li "Sky" Xiaofeng	(South Korea) Lee "Check" Hyung Joo	(South Korea) Park "Lyn" Joon	(Russia) Dmitry "Happy" Kostin
Intel Extreme Masters; Season IV - Global Challenge (China) Chengdu	(China) Lu "Fly100%" Weiliang	(South Korea) Jang "Moon" Jae Ho	(China) Li "Sky" Xiaofeng	(South Korea) Eom "FoCuS" Hyo Sub
Battle.Net Season VII (BlizzCon) (United States) Anaheim	(South Korea) Park "Lyn" Joon	(Netherlands) Manuel "Grubby" Schenkhuizen	(South Korea) Yoon "SocceR" Deok Man	(South Korea) Park "Shy" Chul Woo
e-Stars Seoul 2009 Kotg (South Korea) Seoul	(Netherlands) Manuel "Grubby" Schenkhuizen	(South Korea) Park "Lyn" Joon	(China) Lu "Fly100% Weiliang	(South Korea) Jang "Moon" Jae Ho
ProGamer League IV (China) Chengdu	(China) Lu "Fly100%" Weiliang	(China) Li "Sky" Xiaofeng	(South Korea) Jang "WhO" Doo Sub (3rd/4th place)	(China) Wang "Infi" Xuwen (3rd/4th place)

=== 2008 ===
	Gold	Silver	Bronze	4th
International E-Sports Festival (China) Wuhan	(South Korea) Jang "Moon" Jae Ho	(China) Li "Sky" Xiaofeng	(France) Yoan "ToD" Merlo	(China) Wang "Infi" Xuwen
Make Games Colorful (China) Wuhan	(China) Zeng "TeD" Zhuo	(China) Lu "Fly100%" Weiliang	(China) Su "suhO" Hao	(South Korea) Jo "FoV" Dae Hui
World Cyber Games (Germany) Cologne	(Netherlands) Manuel "Grubby" Schenkhuizen	(South Korea) Jang "Moon" Jae Ho	(Russia) Dmitry "Happy" Kostin	(Ukraine) Mykhaylo "HoT" Novopashyn
World e-Sports Masters (China) Hangzhou	(China) Wang "Infi" Xuwen	(South Korea) Park "Lyn" Joon	(Netherlands) Manuel "Grubby" Schenkhuizen	(South Korea) Jang "Moon" Jae Ho
Battle.Net Season VI (BlizzCon) (United States) Anaheim	(South Korea) Park "Lyn" Joon	(Spain) Pedro "LucifroN" Moreno Duran	(Russia) Dmitry "Happy" Kostin	(South Korea) Lee "Check" Hyung Joo
Electronic Sports World Cup (United States) San José	(South Korea) Jang "WhO" Doo Sub	(China) Li "Sky" Xiaofeng	(China) Zeng "TeD" Zhuo	(South Korea) Kang "ReiGn" Seo Woo
Blizzard Worldwide Invitational (France) Paris	(South Korea) Jang "Moon" Jae Ho	(South Korea) Park "Lyn" Joon	(Netherlands) Manuel "Grubby" Schenkhuizen (3rd/4th place)	(China) Li "Sky" Xiaofeng (3rd/4th place)
ProGamer League III (China) Beijing	(China) Huang "TH000" Xiang	(South Korea) Jang "Moon" Jae Ho	(China) Li "Sky" Xiaofeng (3rd/4th place)	(China) Lu "Fly100%" Weiliang (3rd/4th place)
KODE5 (Russia) Moscow	(China) Wang "Infi" Xuwen	(South Korea) Yoon "SocceR" Deok Man	(South Korea) Park "Shy" Chul Woo	(Germany) Dennis "HasuObs" Schneider
ProGamer League II (China) Beijing	(South Korea) Jang "Moon" Jae Ho	(China) Li "Sky" Xiaofeng	(South Korea) Chun "Sweet" Jung Hee	(China) Sun "xiaOt" Liwei

=== 2007 ===
	Gold	Silver	Bronze	4th
World Cyber Games (United States) Seattle	(Norway) Olav "Creolophus" Undheim	(China) Li "Sky" Xiaofeng	(South Korea) Jang "Moon" Jae Ho	(Russia) Mikhail "XyLigan" Ryabkov
Battle.Net Season V (BlizzCon) (United States) Anaheim	(Norway) Olav "Creolophus" Undheim	(South Korea) Kim "ReMinD" Sung Sik	(Netherlands) Manuel "Grubby" Schenkhuizen	(South Korea) Park "Shy" Chul Woo
Electronic Sports World Cup (France) Paris	(South Korea) Lee "SoJu" Seong Deok	(Norway) Olav "Creolophus" Undheim	(Netherlands) Manuel "Grubby" Schenkhuizen	(South Korea) Park "Lyn" Joon
Blizzard Worldwide Invitational (South Korea) Seoul	(France) Yoan "ToD" Merlo	(South Korea) Jo "FoV" Dae Hui	(China) Li "Sky" Xiaofeng (3rd/4th place)	(South Korea) Jang "Moon" Jae Ho (3rd/4th place)
WSVG China (China) Wuhan	(South Korea) Jang "Moon" Jae Ho	(China) Li "Sky" Xiaofeng	(South Korea) Oh "Susiria" Jung Ki	(Netherlands) Manuel "Grubby" Schenkhuizen
International E-Sports Festival (South Korea) Seoul	(China) Wang "Infi" Xuwen	(South Korea) Park "Lyn" Joon	(China) Sun "xiaOt" Liwei	(South Korea) Kim "GoStop" Dong Moon
Game-X (Russia) Moscow	(South Korea) Jang "Moon" Jae Ho	(South Korea) Jo "FoV" Dae Hui	(Russia) Andrey "Deadman" Sobolev	(South Korea) Chun "Sweet" Jung Hee
Battle.Net Season IV (Germany) Cologne	(South Korea) Kim "ReMinD" Sung Sik	(South Korea) Noh "Lucifer" Jae Wook	(Netherlands) Manuel "Grubby" Schenkhuizen	(France) Yoan "ToD" Merlo

=== 2006 ===
	Gold	Silver	Bronze	4th
World Series of Video Games (United States) New York	(Netherlands) Manuel "Grubby" Schenkhuizen	(South Korea) Chun "Sweet" Jung Hee	(South Korea) Jo "FoV" Dae Hui	(United States) Dennis "Shortround" Chan
International Electronic Sports Tournament (China) Beijing	(South Korea) Jang "Moon" Jae Ho	(China) Li "Sky" Xiaofeng	(South Korea) Noh "Lucifer" Jae Wook	(Bulgaria) Zdravko "Insomnia" Georgiev
World Cyber Games (Italy) Monza	(China) Li "Sky" Xiaofeng	(France) Yoan "ToD" Merlo	(Ukraine) Mykhaylo "HoT" Novopashyn	(Russia) Mikhail "XyLigan" Ryabkov
Electronic Sports World Cup (France) Paris	(South Korea) Noh "Lucifer" Jae Wook	(Croatia) Ivica "Zeus" Marković	(China) Li "Sky" Xiaofeng	(Bulgaria) Zdravko "Insomnia" Georgiev
KODE5 (China) Beijing	(Russia) Andrey "Deadman" Sobolev	(France) Yoan "ToD" Merlo	(Netherlands) Manuel "Grubby" Schenkhuizen	(South Korea) Jo "FoV" Dae Hui
ProGamer League (China) Beijing	(China) Li "Sky" Xiaofeng	(China) Lu "Fly100%" Weiliang	(South Korea) Jo "FoV" Dae Hui	(South Korea) Lee "Check" Hyung Joo
World e-Sports Festival (China) Qing Dao	(Netherlands) Manuel "Grubby" Schenkhuizen	(France) Yoan "ToD" Merlo	(China) Su "suhO" Hao	(Sweden) Kim "SaSe" Hammar
World e-Sports Games Masters (China) Hangzhou	(France) Yoan "ToD" Merlo	(Netherlands) Manuel "Grubby" Schenkhuizen	(China) Li "Sky" Xiaofeng	(South Korea) Jang "Moon" Jae Ho
Battle.Net Season III (Blizzard Worldwide Invitational) (South Korea) Seoul	(South Korea) Chun "Sweet" Jung Hee	(Netherlands) Manuel "Grubby" Schenkhuizen	(South Korea) Kim "ShowTime" Dae Ho	(South Korea) Hong "FarSeer" Won Ui

=== 2005 ===
	Gold	Silver	Bronze	4th
World E-Sport Games III (South Korea) Seoul	(South Korea) Chun "Sweet" Jung Hee	(South Korea) Kim Dong "Gostop" Moon	(South Korea) Jae Wook "Lucifer" Noh	(Sweden) Björn "ElakeDuck" Ödman
China Internet Gaming (China) Shanghai	(South Korea) Jo "FoV" Dae Hui	(France) Yoan "ToD" Merlo	(South Korea) Jang "Moon" Jae Ho	(South Korea) Kim "ReMinD" Sung Sik
World Cyber Games Singapore	(China) Li "Sky" Xiaofeng	(United States) Dennis "Shortround" Chan	(Netherlands) Manuel "Grubby" Schenkhuizen	(France) Yoan "ToD" Merlo
BlizzCon (United States) Anaheim	(Netherlands) Manuel "Grubby" Schenkhuizen	(South Korea) Hwang "Zacard" Tae Min	(France) Yoan "ToD" Merlo	(United States) Dennis "Shortround" Chan
Electronic Sports World Cup (France) Paris	(Netherlands) Manuel "Grubby" Schenkhuizen	(Russia) Andrey "Deadman" Sobolev	(South Korea) Kang "ReiGn" Seo Woo	(China) Li "Sky" Xiaofeng
Cyberathlete Professional League Summer (United States) Grapevine	(France) Yoan "ToD" Merlo	(Bulgaria) Dimitar "DIDI8" Aleksandrov	(Sweden) Björn "ElakeDuck" Ödman	(United States) David "Suboshi" Lynch
ACON 5 (China) Xi'an	(China) Li "Sky" Xiaofeng	(South Korea) Kim "ReMinD" Sung Sik	(Russia) Andrey "Deadman" Sobolev	(Germany) Daniel "Miou" Holthuis
World E-Sport Games II (South Korea) Seoul	(South Korea) Jang "Moon" Jae Ho	(South Korea) Kim Dong "Gostop" Moon	(Lithuania) Gediminas "WinneR" Rimkus	(United States) Dennis "Shortround" Chan
World E-Sport Games I (South Korea) Seoul	(South Korea) Jang "Moon" Jae Ho	(South Korea) Hwang "Zacard" Tae Min	(China) Li "Sky" Xiaofeng	(China) Zhou "MagicYang" Chen

=== 2004 ===
	Gold	Silver	Bronze	4th
World Cyber Games (United States) San Francisco	(Netherlands) Manuel "Grubby" Schenkhuizen	(South Korea) Hwang "Zacard" Tae Min	(France) Yoan "ToD" Merlo	(United States) Dennis "Shortround" Chan
Electronic Sports World Cup (France) Poitiers	(South Korea) Jo "FoV" Dae Hui	(Sweden) Fredrik "MaDFroG" Johansson	(Sweden) Alborz "HeMaN" Haidarian	(South Korea) Chun "Sweet" Jung Hee
ACON 4 (China) Shanghai	(United States) Matthew "Wizard" Anderson	(Russia) Andrey "Deadman" Sobolev	(South Korea) Chun "Sweet" Jung Hee	(China) Su "suhO" Hao
Blizzard Worldwide Invitational (South Korea) Seoul	(Sweden) Fredrik "MaDFroG" Johansson	(Singapore) Jonathan "duckie" Tan Wei Zhong	(China) Lu "TrustMyself" Aodan	(South Korea) SeoWoo "ReiGn" Kang
Cyber X Gaming (United States) Las Vegas	(Netherlands) Manuel "Grubby" Schenkhuizen	(United States) Matthew "Wizard" Anderson	(Bulgaria) Zdravko "Insomnia" Georgiev	(Croatia) Ivica "Zeus" Marković

=== 2003 ===
	Gold	Silver	Bronze	4th
World Cyber Games (South Korea) Seoul	(Bulgaria) Zdravko "Insomnia" Georgiev	(China) Guo "ChinaHuman" Bin	(Romania) Sorin "EviscEratoR" Popescu	(Chinese Taipei) Chun Yu "ShaMan" Shen
Electronic Sports World Cup (France) Poitiers	(Sweden) Alborz "HeMaN" Haidarian	(Sweden) Fredrik "MaDFroG" Johansson	(France) Antoine "FaTC" Zadri	(France) Yoan "ToD" Merlo
clikarena (France) Toulouse	(Bulgaria) Dimitar "DIDI8" Aleksandrov	(Russia) Ivan "Soul" Demidov	(Bulgaria) Zdravko "Insomnia" Georgiev	(South Korea) Yim Hyo "Anyppi" Jin
Cyberathlete Professional League Cannes (France) Cannes	(France) Eric "InToX" Dieulangard	(Bulgaria) Zdravko "Insomnia" Georgiev	(Bulgaria) Dimitar "DIDI8" Aleksandrov	(Russia) Ivan "Soul" Demidov

== Team competitions ==
=== 2020 ===
	Gold	Silver	Bronze	4th
Warcraft Gold Team League Summer 2020 (China) Online	ELL (China) Guo "eer0" Zixiang (South Korea) Park "Lyn" Joon (South Korea) Jo "LawLiet" Ju Yeon	(China) Rogue Warriors (China) Wang "Infi" Xuwen (China) Huang "TH000" Xiang (China) Lu "Fly100%" Weiliang	(China) LP Club (China) Lai "Colorful" Yongyun (South Korea) Eom "FoCuS" Hyo Sub (China) Xu "Fortitude" Yuxing (China) Chen "XiaoKK" Zuo	(South Korea) Rise Again (South Korea) Jang "Moon" Jae Ho (South Korea) Noh "Michael" Jae Wook (South Korea) Roh "ThundeR" Jin Wook
NetEase Esports X Tournament - Winter (China) Shanghai	(China) LP Club (China) Lai "Colorful" Yongyun (South Korea) Eom "FoCuS" Hyo Sub (China) Xu "Romantic" Yuxing (China) Chen "XiaoKK" Zuo	(China) Rogue Warriors (China) Wang "Infi" Xuwen (China) Lu "Fly100%" Weiliang (China) Huang "TH000" Xiang	(China) Newbee (South Korea) Park "Lyn" Joon (South Korea) Jo "LawLiet" Ju Yeon (China) Guo "eer0" Zixiang	(China) Lucky Future (South Korea) Jeon "Soin" Jin Hwan (China) Wu "WFZ" Fazhen (China) Wang "ice orc" Changpeng (Russia) Dmitry "Happy" Kostin

=== 2019 ===
	Gold	Silver	Bronze	4th
NetEase Esports X Tournament - Winter (China) Guangzhou	(South Korea) Park "Lyn" Joon (South Korea) Jo "LawLiet" Ju Yeon (South Korea) Noh "Lucifer" Jae Wook	(South Korea) Jang "Moon" Jae Ho (South Korea) Lee "Check" Hyung Joo (China) Lai "Colorful" Yongyun	(China) Lu "Fly100%" Weiliang" (South Korea) Moon "Chaemiko" Chae Young (China) Yan "Life" Hao	(China) Guo "eer0" Zixiang (South Korea) Eom "FoCuS" Hyo Sub (South Korea) Jeon "Soin" Jin Hwan

=== 2018 ===
	Gold	Silver	Bronze	4th
NetEase Esports X Tournament - Summer (China) Guangzhou	South Korea (South Korea) Jang "Moon" Jae Ho (South Korea) Park "Lyn" Joon (South Korea) Jeon "Soin" Jin Hwan (South Korea) Eom "FoCuS" Hyo Sub (South Korea) Jo "LawLiet" Ju Yeon	China (China) Lu "Fly100%" Weiliang (China) Huang "TH000" Xiang (China) Wang "Infi" Xuwen (China) Guo "eer0" Zixiang (China) Lai "Colorful" Yongyun	Only two teams participated	Only two teams participated

=== 2016 ===
	Gold	Silver	Bronze	4th
Golden Championship Series Fall 2v2 (China) Shanghai	(China) "Hainiu" (China) Zeng "TeD" Zhou	(China) Lu "Fly100%" Weiliang (China) Zhou "Zhou_Xixi" Xixi	(China) Yu "Yumiko" Jiankai (China) Wu "WFZ" Fazhen	(South Korea) Eom "FoCuS" Hyo Sub (South Korea) Jo "LawLiet" Ju Yeon
World Cyber Arena - China vs. Korea (China) Beijing / Shanghai	South Korea (South Korea) Jo "LawLiet" Ju Yeon (South Korea) Park "Lyn" Joon (South Korea) Eom "FoCuS" Hyo Sub (South Korea) Kim "ReMinD" Sung Sik (South Korea) Lee "Check" Hyung Joo	China (China) Lu "Fly100%" Weiliang (China) Wang "Infi" Xuwen (China) Huang "TH000" Xiang (China) Guo "eer0" Zixiang (China) Yan "Life" Hao	Only two teams participated	Only two teams participated
Golden Championship Series Spring 2v2 (China) Shanghai	(China) Lu "Fly100%" Weiliang (China) Zhou "Zhou_Xixi" Xixi	(China) Yu "Yumiko" Jiankai (China) Wu "WFZ" Fazhen	(China) "Kingstod" (China) Chen "XiaoKK" Zuo	(China) "MoLi" (China) "MonMon"

=== 2015 ===
	Gold	Silver	Bronze	4th
Golden Championship Series 2v2 (China) Shanghai	(South Korea) Lee "Check" Hyung Joo (China) Zeng "TeD" Zhou	(China) "Hainiu" (China) "Kingstod"	(China) Yu "Yumiko" Jiankai (China) Wu "WFZ" Fazhen	(China) "cuplbie" (China) "TJ"

=== 2010 ===
	Gold	Silver	Bronze	4th
Warcraft III Champions League Season XVI	(South Korea) Wemade FOX (South Korea) Jang "Moon" Jae Ho (South Korea) Park "Lyn" Joon (South Korea) Yoon "SocceR" Deok Man	(Germany) MeetYourMakers.WC3 (South Korea) Kim "ReMinD" Sung Sik (Spain) Pedro "LucifroN" Moreno Duran	(Netherlands) Serious Gaming (Sweden) Hjalmar "DowaQ" Högberg (South Korea) Kim "viOLet" Dong Hwan	(China) World Elite (China) Li "Sky" Xiaofeng (China) Zeng "TeD" Zhuo (China) Wang "Infi" Xuwen (China) Li "Like" Kejing (China) Li "Future" Shenghui (China) Su "suhO" Hao

=== 2009 ===
	Gold	Silver	Bronze	4th
Warcraft III Champions League Season XV (China) Beijing	(Germany) Wicked e-Sports (South Korea) Eom "FoCuS" Hyo Sub (South Korea) Park "Shy" Chul Woo (South Korea) Jo "MinHyuk" Min Hyuk (South Korea) Park "Space" Seung Hyun	(Germany) mousesports (Germany) Dennis "HasuObs" Schneider (South Korea) Jo "FoV" Dae Hui (China) Huang"TH000" Xiang (China) Lu "Fly100% Weiliang	(United States) Evil Geniuses (Netherlands) Manuel "Grubby" Schenkhuizen (Russia) Dmitry "Happy" Kostin (Denmark) Rene "Ciara" Krag	(Germany) nGize (South Korea) Lee "Check" Hyung Joo (United Kingdom) Benjamin "DeMuslim" Baker (Spain) Pedro "LucifroN" Moreno Duran (Denmark) Thomas "ThomasG" Glinski (United States) Nicholas "ShrieK" Whittier
Warcraft III Champions League Season XIV (China) Chengdu	(China) World Elite (China) Li "Sky" Xiaofeng (China) Zeng "TeD" Zhuo (China) Wang "Infi" Xuwen (China) Li "Like" Kejing	(Germany) SK Gaming (South Korea) Kim "ReMinD" Sung Sik (South Korea) Lee "SoJu" Seong Deok (South Korea) Park "Lyn" Joon (South Korea) Kang "ReiGn" Seo Woo (South Korea) Kim "viOLet" Dong Hwan	(Denmark) MeetYourMakers (South Korea) Oh "Susiria" Jung Ki (South Korea) Noh "Lucifer" Jae Wook (South Korea) Jang "Moon" Jae Ho (South Korea) Yoon "SocceR" Deok Man (Netherlands) Manuel "Grubby" Schenkhuizen	(Australia) fnatic (South Korea) Eom "FoCuS" Hyo Sub (South Korea) Park "Shy" Chul Woo (South Korea) Dae "Kei" Deok Yoon (South Korea) Jo "MinHyuk" Min Hyuk

=== 2008 ===
	Gold	Silver	Bronze	4th
NGL One season V (Germany) Berlin	(Germany) mTw (South Korea) Lee "Check" Hyung Joo (South Korea) Jo "FoV" Dae Hui (South Korea) Jang "WhO" Doo Sub (South Korea) Kim "WinNers" Jin Woo	(Germany) SK Gaming (South Korea) Kim "ReMinD" Sung Sik (South Korea) Lee "SoJu" Seong Deok (South Korea) Park "Lyn" Joon (South Korea) Kang "ReiGn" Seo Woo	(Denmark) MeetYourMakers (South Korea) Oh "Susiria" Jung Ki (South Korea) Noh "Lucifer" Jae Wook (South Korea) Yoon "SocceR" Deok Man (South Korea) Jang "Moon" Jae Ho (Netherlands) Manuel "Grubby" Schenkhuizen	Only three teams attended at LAN finals
Warcraft III Champions League Season XIII (China) Changsha	(Denmark) MeetYourMakers (South Korea) Oh "Susiria" Jung Ki (South Korea) Noh "Lucifer" Jae Wook (South Korea) Jang "Moon" Jae Ho (Netherlands) Manuel "Grubby" Schenkhuizen	(Germany) mousesports (France) Yoan "ToD" Merlo (Germany) Dennis "HasuObs" Schneider (China) Lu "Fly100% Weiliang (China) Yu "Yumiko" Jiankai	(Germany) SK Gaming (South Korea) Kim "ReMinD" Sung Sik (South Korea) Lee "SoJu" Seong Deok (South Korea) Park "Lyn" Joon (South Korea) Kang "ReiGn" Seo Woo	(China) World Elite (China) Li "Sky" Xiaofeng (China) Su "suhO" Hao (China) Zeng "TeD" Zhuo (China) Wang "Infi" Xuwen (China) Li "Like" Kejing
Road of the King (China) Wuhan	(China) World Elite (China) Li "Sky" Xiaofeng (China) Su "suhO" Hao (China) Zeng "TeD" Zhuo (China) Wang "Infi" Xuwen (China) Li "Like" Kejing	(Germany) SK Gaming (South Korea) Kim "ReMinD" Sung Sik (South Korea) Lee "SoJu" Seong Deok (South Korea) Park "Lyn" Joon (South Korea) Kang "ReiGn" Seo Woo	(Denmark) MeetYourMakers (South Korea) Oh "Susiria" Jung Ki (South Korea) Noh "Lucifer" Jae Wook (South Korea) Jang "Moon" Jae Ho (Netherlands) Manuel "Grubby" Schenkhuizen	(Australia) fnatic (South Korea) Eom "FoCuS" Hyo Sub (South Korea) Park "Shy" Chul Woo (South Korea) Park "Space" Seung Hyun (South Korea) Jo "MinHyuk" Min Hyuk
NGL One season IV (Germany) Berlin	(Denmark) MeetYourMakers (South Korea) Oh "Susiria" Jung Ki (South Korea) Noh "Lucifer" Jae Wook (South Korea) Eom "FoCuS" Hyo Sub (South Korea) Jang "Moon" Jae Ho	(Germany) SK Gaming (South Korea) Kim "ReMinD" Sung Sik (South Korea) Lee "SoJu" Seong Deok (South Korea) Park "Lyn" Joon (South Korea) Kang "ReiGn" Seo Woo	(Germany) mousesports (France) Yoan "ToD" Merlo (Germany) Dennis "HasuObs" Schneider (Sweden) Kim "SaSe" Hammar (Russia) Dmitriy "Happy" Kostin	(Germany) mTw (South Korea) Kim "Rainbow" Tae In (Germany) Lars-Gerriet "Protois" Reichelt (Canada) Jonathan "KiWiKaKi" Garneau (Belarus) Yaroslav "NightSniper" Kuznetsov

=== 2007 ===
	Gold	Silver	Bronze	4th
Warcraft III Champions League Season XII (Germany) Cologne	(Germany) SK Gaming (South Korea) Kim "ReMinD" Sung Sik (South Korea) Lee "SoJu" Seong Deok (South Korea) Park "Lyn" Joon (Bulgaria) Zdravko "Insomnia" Georgiev (Germany) Daniel "miou" Holthuis (Germany) Daniel "XlorD" Spenst	(Denmark) MeetYourMakers (South Korea) Oh "Susiria" Jung Ki (South Korea) Noh "Lucifer" Jae Wook (South Korea) Jang "Moon" Jae Ho (South Korea) Eom "FoCuS" Hyo Sub	(China) World Elite (China) Li "Sky" Xiaofeng (China) Su "suhO" Hao (China) Zeng "TeD" Zhuo (China) Wang "Infi" Xuwen (China) Li "Like" Kejing	(China) Beijing E-Sports Team (South Korea) Lee "Check" Hyung Joo (South Korea) Jo "FoV" Dae Hui (South Korea) Jang "WhO" Doo Sub (South Korea) Kim "WinNers" Jin Woo (South Korea) Chun "Sweet" Jung Hee
NGL One season III (Germany) Leipzig	(Denmark) MeetYourMakers (South Korea) Oh "Susiria" Jung Ki (South Korea) Noh "Lucifer" Jae Wook (South Korea) Eom "FoCuS" Hyo Sub (South Korea) Jang "Moon" Jae Ho	(Germany) mousesports (China) Lu "Fly100% Weiliang (Germany) Dennis "HasuObs" Schneider (Sweden) Kim "SaSe" Hammar (Russia) Dmitriy "Happy" Kostin	(United Kingdom) Four Kings (Netherlands) Manuel "Grubby" Schenkhuizen (France) Yoan "ToD" Merlo (Norway) Olav "Creolophus" Undheim (Sweden) Sebastian "FuRy" Pesic (Croatia) Ivica "Zeus" Marković	(Germany) SK Gaming (Bulgaria) Zdravko "Insomnia" Georgiev (Germany) Andrew "Fire_de" Regendantz (Germany) Tobias "ownitsch" Jacob (Germany) Daniel "XlorD" Spenst (Germany) Daniel "miou" Holthuis
Stars War IV (China) Shanghai	(South Korea) CovaNoil (South Korea) Jo "FoV" Dae Hui (South Korea) Jang "Moon" Jae Ho (South Korea) Lee "SoJu" Seong Deok (South Korea) Kim Sung "ReMinD" Sik (South Korea) Kang "ReiGn" Seo Woo	(European Union) Romantic Elves (France) Yoan "ToD" Merlo (Russia) Yura "Neytpoh" Karev (Sweden) Kim "SaSe" Hammar (Netherlands) Manuel "Grubby" Schenkhuizen	(China) Kylin (China) Li "Sky" Xiaofeng (China) Su "suhO" Hao (China) Zeng "TeD" Zhuo (China) Wang "Infi" Xuwen	(China) Dragon (China) Lu "Fly100% Weiliang (China) Sun "xiaOt" Liwei (China) Yanchao "Lyc" Lv (China) Cheng Long "Sai" Zhou
Warcraft III Champions League Season XI (Germany) Hamburg	(China) World Elite (China) Li "Sky" Xiaofeng (South Korea) Kim "ReMinD" Sung Sik (South Korea) Park "Lyn" Joon (South Korea) Lee "SoJu" Seong Deok (South Korea) Kang "ReiGn" Seo Woo	(United Kingdom) Four Kings (Netherlands) Manuel "Grubby" Schenkhuizen (France) Yoan "ToD" Merlo (Norway) Olav "Creolophus" Undheim (Sweden) Sebastian "FuRy" Pesic (Croatia) Ivica "Zeus" Marković	(Denmark) MeetYourMakers (South Korea) Oh "Susiria" Jung Ki (South Korea) Noh "Lucifer" Jae Wook (South Korea) Park "EVE" Jae Shin (South Korea) Jang "Moon" Jae Ho (South Korea) Eom "FoCuS" Hyo Sub	(Germany) SK Gaming (Bulgaria) Zdravko "Insomnia" Georgiev (Germany) Andrew "Fire_de" Regendantz (Ukraine) Mykhaylo "HoT" Novopashyn (Germany) Daniel "XlorD" Spenst (Germany) Daniel "miou" Holthuis
NGL One season II (Germany) Hanover	(China) World Elite (South Korea) Kim "ReMinD" Sung Sik (South Korea) Park "Lyn" Joon (South Korea) Lee "SoJu" Seong Deok (South Korea) Kang "ReiGn" Seo Woo	(Denmark) MeetYourMakers (South Korea) Oh "Susiria" Jung Ki (South Korea) Noh "Lucifer" Jae Wook (South Korea) Eom "FoCuS" Hyo Sub (South Korea) Jang "Moon" Jae Ho	(United Kingdom) Four Kings (Netherlands) Manuel "Grubby" Schenkhuizen (France) Yoan "ToD" Merlo (Norway) Olav "Creolophus" Undheim (Sweden) Sebastian "FuRy" Pesic (Croatia) Ivica "Zeus" Marković	(Australia) fnatic Team (Sweden) Frederic "triMble" Steinfeld (Netherlands) Kevin "RotterdaM" van der Kooi (Sweden) Björn "ElakeDuck" Ödman (Finland) Samuli "elfittaja" Sihvonen
Warcraft III Champions League Season X (Germany) Cologne	(United Kingdom) Four Kings (Netherlands) Manuel "Grubby" Schenkhuizen (France) Yoan "ToD" Merlo (Norway) Olav "Creolophus" Undheim (Sweden) Sebastian "FuRy" Pesic (Croatia) Ivica "Zeus" Marković	(Denmark) MeetYourMakers (South Korea) Oh "Susiria" Jung Ki (South Korea) Noh "Lucifer" Jae Wook (South Korea) Park "EVE" Jae Shin (South Korea) Jang "Moon" Jae Ho (South Korea) Choi "StoRm" Seok Hwan	(China) World Elite (South Korea) Kim "ReMinD" Sung Sik (South Korea) Park "Lyn" Joon (South Korea) Lee "SoJu" Seong Deok (Germany) Clemens "HoTLiPs" Uhlig	(Germany) mousesports (Germany) Minh "Spell" Nguyen (Germany) Dennis "HasuObs" Schneider (Sweden) Kim "SaSe" Hammar (Czech Republic) Michael "Giacomo" Hladik

=== 2006 ===
	Gold	Silver	Bronze	4th
Warcraft III Champions League Season IX (Germany) Oberhausen	(Denmark) MeetYourMakers (South Korea) Oh "Susiria" Jung Ki (South Korea) Noh "Lucifer" Jae Wook (South Korea) Jang "Moon" Jae Ho (South Korea) Choi "StoRm" Seok Hwan	(United Kingdom) Four Kings (Netherlands) Manuel "Grubby" Schenkhuizen (France) Yoan "ToD" Merlo (South Korea) Jo "FoV" Dae Hui (Norway) Olav "Creolophus" Undheim (Sweden) Sebastian "FuRy" Pesic (Croatia) Ivica "Zeus" Marković	(Germany) SK Gaming (Russia) Andrey "Deadman" Sobolev (Bulgaria) Zdravko "Insomnia" Georgiev (Ukraine) Mykhaylo "HoT" Novopashyn (South Korea) Hwang "Zacard" Tae Min	(China) World Elite (South Korea) Kim "ReMinD" Sung Sik (China) Li "Sky" Xiaofeng (South Korea) Lee "Check" Hyung Joo (China) Su "suhO" Hao (South Korea) Lee "SoJu" Seong Deok
NGL One season I (Germany) Leipzig	(Denmark) MeetYourMakers (South Korea) Oh "Susiria" Jung Ki (South Korea) Noh "Lucifer" Jae Wook (South Korea) Jang "Moon" Jae Ho (South Korea) Lee "BerA" Jin Sung	(Germany) SK Gaming (Russia) Andrey "Deadman" Sobolev (Bulgaria) Zdravko "Insomnia" Georgiev (South Korea) Chun "Sweet" Jung Hee (South Korea) Hwang "Zacard" Tae Min	(United Kingdom) Four Kings (Netherlands) Manuel "Grubby" Schenkhuizen (France) Yoan "ToD" Merlo (South Korea) Jo "FoV" Dae Hui (Norway) Olav "Creolophus" Undheim (Croatia) Ivica "Zeus " Marković	(Germany) mousesports (Germany) Minh "Spell" Nguyen (Germany) Dennis "HasuObs" Schneider (Sweden) Kim "SaSe" Hammar (Czech Republic) Michael "Giacomo" Hladik
Stars War III (China) Xi'an	Team China (China) Li "Sky" Xiaofeng (China) Su "suhO" Hao (China) Lu "Fly100% Weiliang (China) Liu "xTiGer" Hongliang (China) Guo "GuangMo" Zhengkun	(European Union) Team Europe (Netherlands) Manuel "Grubby" Schenkhuizen (France) Yoan "ToD" Merlo (Bulgaria) Zdravko "Insomnia" Georgiev (Bulgaria) Dimitar "DIDI8" Aleksandrov (Norway) Olav "Creolophus" Undheim	(South Korea) Team Korea (South Korea) Lee "Check" Hyung Joo (South Korea) Rainbow (South Korea) Kang "ReiGn" Seo Woo (South Korea) Chun "Sweet" Jung Hee (South Korea) Park "Lyn" Joon	
Stars War II (China) Shanghai	(South Korea) Team Korea (South Korea) Jo "FoV" Dae Hui (South Korea) Noh "Lucifer" Jae Wook (South Korea) Jang "Moon" Jae Ho (South Korea) Chun "Sweet" Jung Hee (South Korea) Hwang "Zacard" Tae Min	Team China (China) Li "Sky" Xiaofeng (China) Su "suhO" Hao (China) Sun "xiaOt" Liwei (China) QcH[ATi]Gstar (China) Guo "GuangMo" Zhengkun	(European Union) Team Europe (Netherlands) Manuel "Grubby" Schenkhuizen (France) Yoan "ToD" Merlo (Bulgaria) Zdravko "Insomnia" Georgiev (Sweden) Kim "SaSe" Hammar (Ukraine) Mykhaylo "HoT" Novopashyn	
Transatlantic Showdown (United States) New York, New York	(South Korea) Destiny (South Korea) Jang "Moon" Jae Ho (South Korea) Noh "Lucifer" Jae Wook	(United States) Revolution Sports (United States) Nick "Axslav" Ranish (United States) Cong "Strifecro" Shu	(United Kingdom) Four Kings (Netherlands) Manuel "Grubby" Schenkhuizen (France) Yoan "ToD" Merlo	(United States) United 5 (United States) Franklin "Nilknarf" Pearsall (United States) Matt "lnclnerator" Schlenker

=== 2005 ===
	Gold	Silver	Bronze	4th
Warcraft III Champions League Season VIII (Germany) Cologne	(United Kingdom) Four Kings (Netherlands) Manuel "Grubby" Schenkhuizen (France) Yoan "ToD" Merlo (Croatia) Ivica "Zeus " Marković	(Denmark) MeetYourMakers (South Korea) Hanbit (South Korea) Oh "Susiria" Jung Ki (South Korea) Choi "StoRm" Seok Hwan (South Korea) Lee "BerA" Jin Sung (South Korea) Park "EVE" Jae Shin	(Germany) mousesports (Germany) Minh "Spell" Nguyen (Germany) Dennis "HasuObs" Schneider (South Korea) Kim Hong "Romeo" Jae (United States) Dennis "Shortround" Chan	(Germany) SK Gaming (Ukraine) Mykhaylo "HoT" Novopashyn (Bulgaria) Zdravko "Insomnia" Georgiev (South Korea) Hwang "Zacard" Tae Min (Sweden) Fredrik "MaDFroG" Johansson (South Korea) Jae Pak "EvenStar" Lee
Warcraft III Champions League Season VII (Germany) Cologne	(United Kingdom) Four Kings (Netherlands) Manuel "Grubby" Schenkhuizen (France) Yoan "ToD" Merlo (Croatia) Ivica "Zeus " Marković (South Korea) Jo "FoV" Dae Hui	(Germany) 64AMD (Lithuania) Gediminas "WinneR" Rimkus (Sweden) Björn "ElakeDuck" Ödman (Norway) Olav "Creolophus" Undheim (Sweden) Kim "SaSe" Hammer	(Germany) SK Gaming (Ukraine) Mykhaylo "HoT" Novopashyn (Bulgaria) Zdravko "Insomnia" Georgiev (South Korea) Hwang "Zacard" Tae Min (Germany) Daniel "Miou" Holthuis	(Denmark) MeetYourMakers (South Korea) Oh "Susiria" Jung Ki (South Korea) Noh "Lucifer" Jae Wook (South Korea) Kim Dong "Gostop" Moon (Denmark) Rene "Ciara" Krag (Denmark) Bjarke "Bjarke" Rasmussen

=== 2004 ===
	Gold	Silver	Bronze	4th
Warcraft III Champions League Season VI (Denmark) Copenhagen	(Germany) 64AMD (Sweden) Robert "Enrique" Stolpe (Sweden) Björn "ElakeDuck" Ödman (Romania) Alex "King.Crimson" Andrei (Russia) Andrey "Deadman" Sobolev (Sweden) Kim "SaSe" Hammer (Russia) Igor "Caravaggio" Lyalin	(Denmark) MeetYourMakers (South Korea) Oh "Susiria" Jung Ki (South Korea) Kim Dong "Gostop" Moon (Denmark) Rene "Ciara" Krag (Denmark) Viktor "ySKhYr" Stauning	(Germany) SK Gaming (Sweden) Fredrik "Survivor" Jansson (France) Antoine "FaTC" Zadri (South Korea) Hwang "Zacard" Tae Min (Sweden) Fredrik "MaDFroG" Johansson (Sweden) Alborz "HeMaN" Haidarian	(Germany) mousesports (Germany) Minh "Spell" Nguyen (Germany) Dennis "HasuObs" Schneider (Greece) Marios "PaNiC" Kalagis (Germany) Jan "Jan" Stötera (Germany) Paul "PuN1sher" M. K. (United States) Dennis "Shortround" Chan (United States) David "Suboshi" Lynch
Warcraft III Champions League Season V (Germany) Cologne	(Germany) mTw (United States) Jeff "Aether" Zhang (Germany) Jan "ThePig" Villwock (United States) Matthew "Wizard" Anderson (Germany) Christopher "Tak3r" Heil (Germany) Dennis "LasH" Hoffmann	(United Kingdom) Four Kings (Netherlands) Arvid "Myth" Fekken (Netherlands) Manuel "Grubby" Schenkhuizen (Denmark) Rasmus "KaJ" Simonsen (Sweden) Sebastian "FuRy" Pesic (Croatia) Ivica "Zeus" Marković (Sweden) Rune "Lawn" Granath	(Germany) SK Gaming (France) Antoine "FaTC" Zadri (Bulgaria) Georgi "Zeerax" Marinov (Bulgaria) Zdravko "Insomnia" Georgiev (Sweden) Fredrik "Survivor" Jansson (Norway) Henrik "DominatoR" Strom (Sweden) Alborz "HeMaN" Haidarian	(France) ArmaTeam (Brazil) Marcus "Skyward" Locatelli (France) Yoan "ToD" Merlo (France) Eric "InToX" Dieulangard (France) Raphaël ";Shore" Benhakoun
Warcraft III Champions League Season IV (France) Paris	(United Kingdom) Four Kings (Netherlands) Arvid "Myth" Fekken (Netherlands) Manuel "Grubby" Schenkhuizen (Denmark) Rasmus "KaJ" Simonsen (Sweden) Sebastian "FuRy" Pesic (Croatia) Ivica "Zeus" Marković (Sweden) Rune "Lawn" Granath	(France) ArmaTeam (United States) Alex "Sabre" B. (United States) RaZ (France) Eric "InToX" Dieulangard (France) Lou "Blatty" Gentet (United States) Dennis "Shortround" Chan	Only two teams attended at LAN finals	Only two teams attended at LAN finals

=== 2003 ===
	Gold	Silver	Bronze	4th
World Cyber Games Nations (South Korea) Seoul	Chinese Taipei (Chinese Taipei) Kai "Slacash" Hsunliu (Chinese Taipei) Cheng "Tapelle" Pinhuang	United Kingdom (United Kingdom) Iain "TillerMaN" Girdwood (United Kingdom) Alex "BoNd" Bond	Netherlands (Netherlands) Arvid "Myth" Fekken (Netherlands) Manuel "Grubby" Schenkhuizen	China (China) Hao "limmouse" Su (China) Guo "ChinaHuman" Bin
