= Fly100% =

Chinese professional Warcraft III player

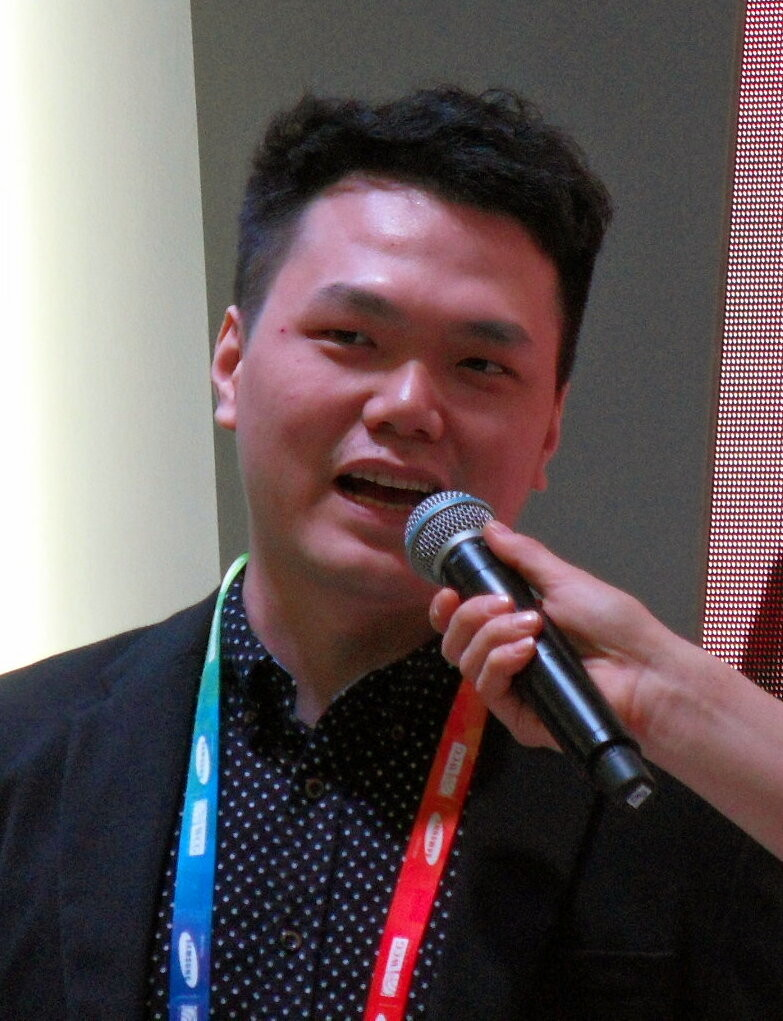
- Wang in 2013

Personal information
- Name: Lu Weiliang
- Born: 1985 or 1986 (age 39–40)
- Nationality: Chinese

Career information
- Games: Warcraft III: The Frozen Throne; StarCraft II

Lu Weiliang (Chinese: 陆维梁; pinyin: Lu Weiliang), who also goes by the pseudonym Fly100%, is a Chinese professional esports player of the real-time strategy game Warcraft III: The Frozen Throne. He previously been a member of Team Hacker, EHOME and Mousesports. He is considered one of the best Orc players. He had one of the longest playing careers of professional players of Warcraft III.

== Career ==
Fly100% started his professional e-sports career in team Hacker and started gaining recognition in international competitive gaming after joining the mousesports. In starWar, he beat Park "Lyn" June, In "Rainbow" Kim Tae and Chun "Sweet" Jung-Hee, and became the MVP in this tournament. In NGL-one, he beat Manuel "Grubby" Schenkhuizen, Yoan "ToD" Merlo and Olav "Creolophus" Undheim and helped the Mousesports get the 2nd. Mousesports also got the runner-up of Warcraft III Champions League Season XVI (WC3L). He joined Chinese team EHOME in 2009. From 2008 to 2009, he won multiple tournaments, like the International E-Sports Festival 2009, ProGamer League IV, ESWC Asian master. World Cyber Games was ever considered the toughest to win of all tournaments and had a player field that included names as Manuel Schenkhuizen, Jang Jae-Ho and Dae Hui Cho. Lu Weiliang won the champion of wcg China in 2009 and reached the grand final of World Cyber Games in 2009 and 2012 but both got runner up and got the 3rd place in WCG 2011. In another premier tournament IEM(ESL), he was the champion of Intel Extreme Masters Global Challenge Chengdu.

In 2011 he played in a single notable StarCraft II tournament, the China 1st 3D Electronic Games. He was knocked out of the tournament in the first round by Infi, who defeated him 2–0.

== Notable accomplishments ==
=== Individual ===
- CEG Beijing (2006)
- CEG Guangzhou (2006)
- ProGamer 2006 (2006)
- 4th ProGamer League Season 1 (2007)
- Electronic Sports World Cup China (2007)
- China Fight (2007)
- WCG China (2007)
- NGTV All Star Invitation (2008)
- NGTV League Season 1 (2008)($12000)
- NWL League Season 1 (2008)
- MGC2008 Global Challenge (2008)
- DCup League Season 4 (2008)
- ProGamer League Season 4 (2009) ($13000)
- Intel Extreme Masters Global Challenge Chengdu (2009)
- EOG2009 (2009) ($5000)
- International E-Sports Festival 2009 (2009) ($10000)
- World Cyber Games 2009 (2009)
- PGL Championship Challenge (2009)
- e-Stars Seoul 2009 Kotg (2009)
- IEST2009 China (2009)
- 4th World e-Sports Masters (2009)
- ECL2010 League Season 2 (2010) ($3000)
- WCG China (2010) ($2000)
- ECL2010 League Season 2 (2010) ($2000)
- International E-Sports Festival 2010 (2010) ($5000)
- ECL2010 Grand Final (2010) ($3000)
- starswar6 (2011)
- WCG China (2010) ($5000)
- World Cyber Games 2011 (2011)($1000)
- ECL2011 Grand Final (2010) ($5000)
- World Cyber Games 2012 (2012)
- World Cyber Arena (2015) ($54,000)

=== Team ===
- Stars War III
- Warcraft III Champions League Season XV
- Warcraft III Champions League Season XV
- NGL One season III
