= Infi =

Chinese professional Warcraft III player

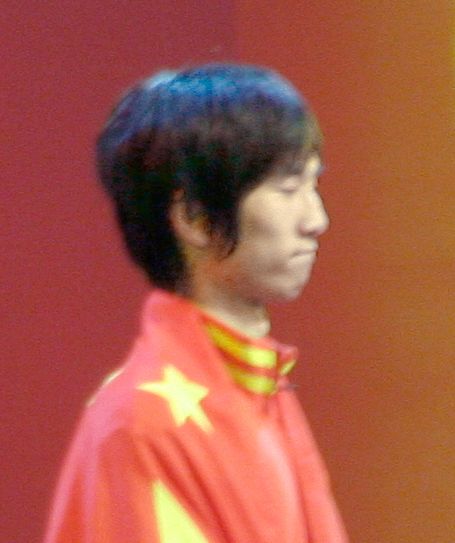
- Wang in 2009

Personal information
- Name: Wang Xuwen
- Nickname(s): Tower Race, Six Race
- Nationality: Chinese

Career information
- Games: Warcraft III; Starcraft II
- Playing career: 2006–2016, 2018–2020

Career highlights and awards
- 2× WCG champion (2009, 2019)

Wang Xuwen (Chinese: 王诩文), who goes by the pseudonym Infi, is a Chinese professional esports player of the real-time strategy games Warcraft III: The Frozen Throne and Starcraft II. He previously served in team World Elite, Tyloo and VICI GAMING. He is considered one of the best Human players in the world. In 2008, World Elite was the best team of the year and Wang Xuwen was the core member. In 2009, Wang Xuwen helped World Elite obtain the champion of Warcraft III Champions League Season XIV. Additionally, Wang Xuwen also has many individual champion titles from various Premier Tournaments such as World Cyber Games and World e-Sports Games. From 2008 to 2011, the Chinese competitive scene for Warcraft III was dominated by 4 players, Lu "Fly100%" Weiliang, Li "Sky" Xiaofeng, Wang "Infi" Xuwen and Huang "TH000"Xiang. Wang "Infi" Xuwen and the other three were considered the four kings in Chinese Warcraft III. He played Starcraft II for a few years before retiring from competitive gaming.

== Playing style ==
Wang "Infi" Xuwen has been nicknamed "Tower Race" or "the Six Race" as he was known for building many towers as a defensive and sometimes offensive strategy. In extreme cases, his towers could control sizable areas of the map. He often builds a large number of towers for detection as well, and then uses invisible Summoned creatures to raid his opponent. He employed this strategy and beat Fly100% in the grand final of World Cyber Games 2009.

== Career ==
Infi started gaining recognition internationally in team World Elite. In 2007, World Elite came 3rd place in Warcraft III Champions League Season XII. In 2008, World Elite was the champion of Road of the King tournament and became the team of year. In 2009, World Elite became the champion of Warcraft III Champions League Season XIV. Wang Xuwen also has many notable individual achievements. In 2007, he beat Dae Hui "FoV" Cho, Sun "xiaOt" Liwei and June "Lyn" Park in the International E-Sports Festival 2007. He is the first non-Korean champion in this tournament and also the first non-Korean champion in a tournament which was held in Korea. In 2008, he was the champion of KODE5 in Moscow and World e-Sports Games. Infi saw success in the World Cyber Games, whose tournaments are considered some of the most important for Warcraft III players. After beating Weiliang "Fly100%" Lu, Dmitry "Happy" Kostin and Jang "Moon" Jae Ho, he won the championship for World Cyber Games 2009. In 2010, he was the runner-up of Battle.Net Season VIII. At the end of 2010, Infi left World Elite and joined team PanDa, which shortly afterwards merged with team Tyloo. He played for ViCi Gaming as a Starcraft II player for a few years before switching back to Warcraft III again.

== Notable accomplishments ==
=== Individual ===
- International E-Sports Festival 2007 (2007) ($10000)
- IEST2007 China (2007) (2007) ($6000)
- Super Wednesday 2007 (2007)
- KODE5 (2008) ($10000)
- DCupII (2008) ($100)
- NSL2 (2008) ($3000)
- xLo Asia Cup (2008) (€100)
- MIP and MVP in the regular season of WC3L (2008)
- World e-Sports Masters (2008) ($15000)
- 4th International E-Sports Festival 2008 (2008) ($1500)
- ProGamer League Season 1 (2008) ($3000)
- International E-Sports Festival 2009 (2009) ($5000)
- World Cyber Games 2009 (2009)
- World Cyber Games 2019 (2019)
- 4th G League Season 8 (2008) ($150)
- Shadow League (2010) (€2250)
- 4thNSL3 China (2010) ($150)
- G League 2010 Season 3 (2010)
- BlizzCon 2010 ($10000)
- International E-Sports Festival 2010 (2010) ($10000)
- G League 2010 Season 4 (2010)
- G League 2010 Season 5 (2010)
- WGT (2010) ($3000)
- ECL 2010 (2010) ($1500)
- ECL 2011 season 1 (2011) ($3000)
- International E-Sports Festival China National Qualify (2011) ($1200)
- International E-Sports Festival 2012 (2012) ($2000)
- G League 2012 Season 2 (2012) ($8000)
- WEC 2014 (2014) ($13000)
- WCA 2014 Grand Final (2014) ($45000)
- World GameMaster Tournaments (2014) ($4800)
- ESCC 2015 (2015) ($12000)
- PGL Return the kings 2015 (2015) ($4600)
- Gold Series 2015 Grand Final (Warcraft III) Season 1 (2016) ($6000)
- Mo Cup (2016) ($450)
- Yuwan Cup (2016) ($1500)
- CIG Nanchang 2017 (2017) ($15000)
- Gold Series Warcraft III 2017 Summer (2017) ($3000)

=== Team ===
- Stars War IV (2007)
- Warcraft III Champions League Season XIII (2007)
- Road of the King(2008) ($10000 for whole team World Elite)
- Warcraft III Champions League Season XIV(2009)($10000 for whole team World Elite)
