= Sweet (gamer) =

South Korean esports player

Personal information
- Name: Chun Jung-Hee
- Nickname(s): Sweet, nOma
- Nationality: South Korean

Career information
- Games: Warcraft III; League of Legends
- Playing career: Until 2008
- Coaching career: 2013–2014

Team history

As player:
- 2003: SAINT
- 2004–2005: SK Gaming
- 2005–2006: World Elite
- 2006–2008: Beijing esports Team

As coach:
- 2013: Prime Optimus

Chun Jung-hee (Korean: 천정희) is a retired South Korean professional player of the real-time strategy game Warcraft III: The Frozen Throne. He used to play for the Chinese professional gaming team Beijing eSport Team. He goes by the gamertag of Sweet (previously nOma) and is a member of clan WeRRa.

He has been recognized among the top tier of Warcraft III players since the beginning of the professional competitive scene and has won two world championships as well as several professional events in South Korea.

After finished his military duty, he became coach of the Jin Air Greenwings League of Legends team.

== Career ==
=== Warcraft III ===
After the release of Warcraft III: Reign of Chaos in 2002 Jung Hee Chun rose to quickly be noticed as one of the strongest players in the South Korean scene, which was at the time known as the most competitive gaming scene in the world.

He participated in several televised leagues and showed strong results, finishing top three in two of the biggest televised leagues played using Reign of Chaos; MBC Sonokong Prime League II and Sonokong OnGamenet II. He represented the SAINT Proteam during this time, which disbanded near 2004 and made Jung Hee Chun as well as his former teammates free agents. The Warcraft III division of the former Saint Proteam was recruited by German professional gaming team SK Gaming to boost their appeal in Asia.

This gave Sweet regular exposure to the international gaming scene, as SK Gaming's team site was widely visited by the competitive gaming community.

By 2004 the professional scene moved on to Warcraft III: The Frozen Throne, and Chun rose to become Korea's face to the world during this time. He qualified for a number of international tournaments that offered very limited slots to Korean participants, and because of the intensity of the competitive Korean scene therefore rarely saw players making more than one appearance at tournaments of this nature.

In 2004, he represented South Korea at the Electronic Sports World Cup 2004 in Paris and ACON4 in Shanghai, reaching the semi-finals of the Korean televised MBC Daum Prime League IV. He finished fourth at the Electronic Sports World Cup and third at ACON4. During the same period, he joined SK Gaming and became the first player worldwide to reach level 50 on the Asian Battle.net ladder.

As a result of this he was recognized as the world's top Warcraft III player in 2004 by a panel of experts. He was awarded the 'Warcraft III Player of The Year' Award by the ESports Award over his teammate the Swedish professional gamer Fredrik "MaDFroG" Johansson who was recognized as the Player of the Year in all of competitive gaming.

Early 2005 Korean players such as Jang "Moon" Jae Ho, Tae min "Zacard" Hwang and Dae Hui "FoV" Cho were getting more and more recognition internationally due their success in international competition. As a result, Jung Hee Chun's status in the international community dropped, though he was still recognized as one of the best players of the world. He was invited for the first edition of the World e-Sports Games, but faced elimination in the first group stage.

Afterwards he signed a contract with a new Chinese based professional gaming team by the name of World Elite in May 2005, cutting off his ties with SK Gaming. At this time he had not won a major competition and his results in Korean competition were dropping.

Nevertheless, he was one of the four Korean players to qualify for the 2005 Electronic Sports World Cup in Paris, where he was beaten in the quarter-finals by the Dutch professional gamer Manuel "Grubby" Schenkhuizen.

His results hit something of a slump after this, months later he qualified for the third edition of the World e-Sports Games and announced that it would be his last tournament before he would leave professional gaming to fulfill South Korea's mandatory army duty.

He went on to win the tournament; beating Korean professional gamer Kim Dong "Gostop" Moon in the final best of five after being down two matches. Winning US$20,000 in the televised league, Jung Hee Chun postponed his army obligations and decided to resume his career as a professional gamer.

=== Move to China ===
After winning the World e-Sports Games he qualified for the second edition of the Blizzard Worldwide Invitational which was to take place in Seoul, South Korea. Players from all over the world were given a chance to qualify for the tournament on line.

He won this tournament beating Manuel "Grubby" Schenkhuizen in the finals after having previously been knocked down in the lower bracket by the Dutchman. This earned him US$10,000 and meant his second world championship victory in a matter of months, it also prompted some to give him the label "comeback kid".

In April 2006 he moved to Zhangzhou, China to participate in the Masters of the World e-Sports Games to try to defend his title. He was not very successful in the tournament, being eliminated his teammate the Chinese professional gamer Li "Sky" Xiaofeng. But he stayed in China nevertheless, leaving World Elite to sign with the Chinese professional team Beijing eSport Team which provided permanent residence for him in Beijing, China.

He also represented SK Gaming in various competitions at this point, as part of a deal that was canceled January 2007 which allowed Jung Hee Chun to compete in various on line leagues for which the Beijing eSport Team was not qualified.

He competed in various tournaments during his stay in China. Some of which with the status of top tier international competitions such as Stars War II, Stars War III, ProGamer League and the World Series of Video Games stop in Chengdu, China which qualified him for the global World Series of Video Games finals in New York.

These global finals took place December 2006 and was his first appearance outside of Asia since the 2005 Electronic Sports World Cup. He confirmed his status as a top tier contender at the event, which was in decline for some time at that point, by taking second place. He was beaten by Manuel "Grubby" Schenkhuizen in the finals whom he had put in the lower bracket the previous day.

=== Return to Korea ===
At some point in 2007, he moved back to South Korea, which improved his ability to compete in online tournaments due to South Korea's stronger internet infrastructure compared with China.

He qualified for the Battle.net Season IV finals in Cologne, Germany which were seen as a continuation of a series of tournaments of which the Blizzard Worldwide Invitational is a part of, thus making him the defending champion of the event.

He finished among the top of the event by taking fifth place. Throughout the remainder of the running season he has shown results along those lines, finishing among the best of the attendees but not entering top three. For instance he took fourth place at Game-X in Moscow, Russia and seventh at the World Series of Video Games stop in Wuhan, China. He retired in April 2008 due to his obligation to serve his military service.

=== League of Legends ===
He started playing League of Legends in 2012, and eventually competed in League of Legends events. He joined Prime Optimus as a coach in October 2013. In September 2014, he moved to Jin Air Greenwings as coach.

== Tournament results ==
=== International ===
- 2008 3rd PGL Season II (China)
- 2007 2nd Digital Life New York (USA) – US$3,500
- 2007 2nd GGL Digital Life Chengdu (China) – US$5,300
- 2007 4th Game-X (Russia) – US$1,000
- 2007 5th Battle.net Season IV (Germany)
- 2006 2nd World Series of Video Games (United States) – US$10,000
- 2006 2nd World Series of Video Games, Chengdu (China) – US$2,500
- 2006 1st Blizzard Worldwide Invitational (Korea) – US$10,000
- 2005 1st World E-Sport Games III (Korea) – US$20,000
- 2005 5th Electronic Sports World Cup (France) – US$2,000
- 2004 4th Electronic Sports World Cup (France) – US$2,000
- 2004 3rd ACON4 (China)

=== Domestic (qualifiers) ===
- 2007 4th China eSport Games, Xi'an (China)
- 2006 2nd China eSport Games, Chengdu (China)
- 2005 2nd World E-Sport Games III (Korea)
- 2005 3rd Electronic Sports World Cup (Korea)
- 2004 3rd MBC Daum Prime League IV (Korea)
- 2004 2nd Electronic Sports World Cup (Korea)
- 2004 1st ACON 4 (Korea)
- 2003 3rd Sonokong OnGamenet II (Korea)
- 2003 2nd MBC Sonokong Prime League II (Korea)

=== Team ===
- 2006 3rd Stars War III (China) – As a member of team Korea
- 2006 1st Stars War II (China) – As a member of team Korea
- 2003 5nd SUMA Ongamenet Proleague (Korea) – As a member of YECA Proteam
- 2003 2nd MBC Movie MBCgame Clan Team Battle (Korea) – As a member of SAINT Proteam
