= Moon (gamer) =

South Korean esports player

moon
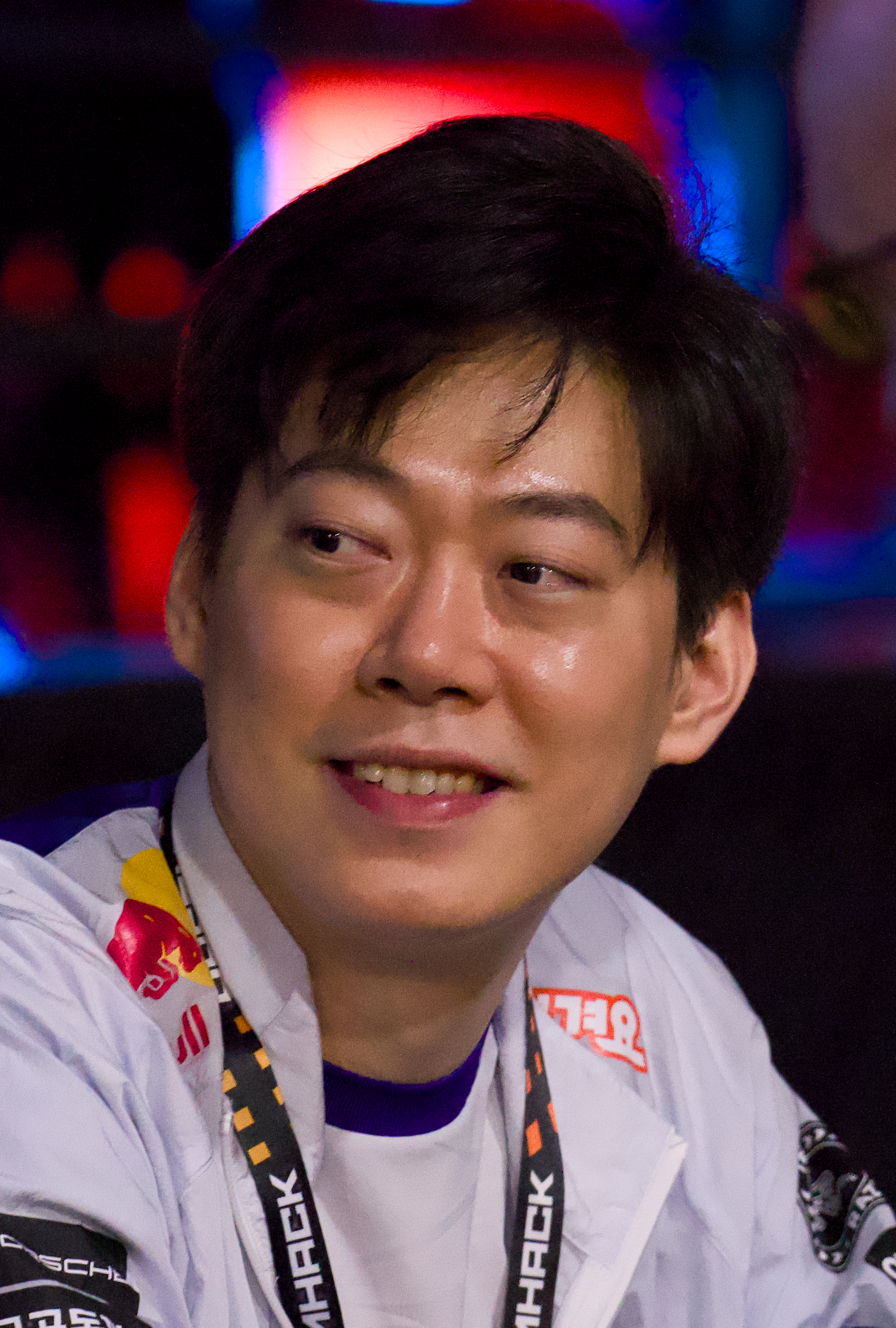
- Jang at ESL StarCraft 2 Masters 2023 Winter

Personal information
- Name: Jang Jae-ho
- Nickname: Fantasista
- Nationality: South Korean

Career information
- Games: Warcraft III; StarCraft II
- Playing career: 2003–2012

Team history
- 2005–2006: Mousesports
- 2006–2008: MeetYourMakers
- 2009–2011: WeMade FOX
- 2012: Fnatic

Career highlights and awards
- 2× IEF champion; WCG champion; 9× MBC Game League champion; 4× NGL-One champion; 2× PGL champion; NeXT champion; 2× IEST champion; 3× WC3L champion; 4× WEG champion

Korean name
- Hangul: 장재호
- RR: Jang Jaeho
- MR: Chang Chaeho

Jang Jae-ho (known as spirit_moon or moon) is a South Korean professional gamer of the popular Blizzard real-time strategy games Warcraft III and StarCraft II. He is seen by many as the best Night Elf player in the world. Jang Jae-ho is a five time world champion and has won three televised national Korean WarCraft III Championships as well as four seasons of MBCGame's World War. He is particularly known for his excellent micromanagement and innovative strategies. He is often seen using strategies that later set the benchmark for many Night Elf players and was nicknamed the "5th Race" by Gametv.com. He has played and won more televised WarCraft III games than any other Warcraft III player. Jang Jae-ho is featured in the documentary film Beyond the Game. Moon transitioned to StarCraft II and was without a team for a while, before retiring from professional gaming in order to fulfill South Korean military service requirements. After completing his military service, Moon returned to Warcraft 3 and is currently active.

== Professional gaming career ==
=== Korean Champion ===
After Warcraft III: The Frozen Throne was released in July 2003 a professional competitive gaming scene supporting the game developed in South Korea. Jang Jae-ho quickly rose to become one of the most prominent players in this scene, winning his first big tournament by beating Chun "Sweet" Jung Hee in the finals of the televised league MBC Sonokong Prime League II in 2003. He defended his championship title in the finals of the next edition of the league (which took place later that year), and lost to Park Se "Swain" Ryong who was at one point down 2 maps (the match is considered one of the greatest comebacks in WarCraft III history).

=== World Champion ===
Known for his innovative strategies, fans nicknamed Jang Jae-ho "Fantasista". After the release of The Frozen Throne he developed into the dominating player of the Korean WarCraft III scene (which he is considered still today). Few major Korean competitions concluded in 2004 (aside from several qualifiers for international tournaments only the MBC Daum Prime League IV). Jang Jae-ho qualified for the 2004 World Cyber Games global finals, meaning he would make his first international appearance.

He was considered the insider favorite for the tournament which took place in San Francisco, California. He was stopped by his countryman Tae Min "Zacard" Hwang in the round of 16 however, considered a major upset since Jang Jae-ho had an unbeaten televised record versus Hwang Tae-min's race of choice, Orc.

Upon his return to Korea he progressed to the last stages of the MBCGame Prime League V and the 2004–2005 Ongamenet War3 TFT Invitational. He eventually progressed to the finals of both which were set to take place in early 2005, he was also invited to a new televised league with an international field of participants named World e-Sports Games meaning he was competing in three televised leagues simultaneously.

He went undefeated in the first season of the World e-Sports Games, beating names as Fredrik Johansson and Li "Sky" Xiaofeng. The eventual finals cast him against the player that knocked him out of the World Cyber Games, Tae Min Zacard, who he proceeded to beat 3–0.

The league was followed intensely by WarCraft III fans around the globe and fully established Jang Jae-ho as a gaming icon. Around the same time he won MBCGame Prime League V and became the runner-up of the 2004–2005 Ongamenet War3 TFT Invitational, losing to Korean prodigy Jang "FreeDoM" Yong Suk in the finals after being up two maps. This further enhanced his reputation as the world's best WarCraft III player and made him one of the best paid gamers of the time; winning US$50,000 in a span of months.

Throughout the rest of 2005 he would win the second season of the World e-Sports Games beating Kim Dong "Gostop" Moon in the grand finals, the MBCGame Warcraft League and several tournaments in China. His winnings in the year were approximately US$83,000 which was by then the largest sum won by any player throughout a year in WarCraft III.

He also signed with the Korean company Pantech & Curitel during this time, representing them in leagues.

During these events a "rivalry" was created between him and Dutch professional gamer Manuel "Grubby" Schenkhuizen by fans. Jang Jae-ho was dominating competitions in South Korea including the globally diverse World e-Sports Games while Manuel Schenkhuizen had what was considered a dominating run in international competition, holding at one point the two most prestigious international titles; that of the World Cyber Games (which he won in 2004) and the Electronic Sports World Cup (which he won in 2005).

As they dominated different circuits they did not meet in any off-line matches throughout the 2005 year . Despite several online matches the rivalry was not resolved during this time as Jang Jae-ho was perceived as having a "racial advantage" with his Night Elf vs. Manuel Schenkhuizen's Orc.

=== 2006 Slump ===
By late 2005 Jang Jae-ho's results weakened, he was eliminated from the second group stage of the World e-Sports Games in the longest tie-breaker (for second place) of the series history which included him, Korean professional gamer Jae Wook "Lucifer" Noh and Swedish professional gamer Kim "SaSe" Hammar.

He signed with Danish professional competitive gaming team MeetYourMakers in February 2006.

He was considered the favorite for the masters of the World e-Sports Games, which took place April 21 – May 3, 2006 in Hangzhou, China. This eight player invitational saw all top two finishers of previous seasons return, and invited a number of players considered the world's strongest at the time.

He went undefeated through the group stages of the tournament, beating French professional gamer Yoan "ToD" Merlo, Kim Dong Moon and Chinese professional gamer Sun Ri "XiaOt" Wai. This cast him against Manuel "Grubby" Schenkhuizen in the semi-finals, which would be their first match in a major international tournament.

Jang Jae-ho lost the match 1–3, which was considered an upset but not totally out of the realm of possibilities as a patch by Blizzard Entertainment as well as strategic adaption to Jang Jae-ho's playing style had made the Night Elf vs. Orc match-up more balanced. He subsequently lost the match for fourth place vs. Xiaofeng Li 2–3, a match widely anticipated by fans as Xiaofeng Li's World Cyber Games victory made him Jang Jae-ho's main WarCraft III rival in Asia.

After that he went through an extended dry spell in tournaments in what is termed a "slump". The professional Korean WarCraft III scene was in decline and Jang Jae-ho had to drop out of the only televised league the country had in the year, MBCGame International League, because it conflicted with the World e-Sports Games.

He did not qualify for any individual international tournament but did have success in team competitions. He was a key factor in Meet Your Makers victory of WarCraft III's most prominent professional team leagues, WarCraft 3 Champions League and the NGL One Professional league. His dry spell ended in October 2006 when he won Global Gaming League's Digital life in New York City, New York, picking up US$5,000. He went on to do well in a series of televised show matches in South Korea, beating Manuel Schenkhuizen 2–0 in a US$10,000 match in the Korean "SuperFight" series.

Manuel Schenkhuizen commented afterward:

"I think the old Moon, the Moon from 2005 is back."

In December he was invited to International Electronic Sports Tournament in Beijing, China, beating Xiaofeng Li in the grand finals he won US$20,000 in the tournament and finished 2006 with a major win.

=== 2007 Domination ===
It was reported February 2007 that Jang Jae-ho had extended his contract with Meet Your Makers for a year with a US$10,000 monthly salary.

Following a strong run at the end of 2006, Jang Jae-ho continued his performance into 2007. During that year, he defended his MBC Game World War title four times. The event is televised series of show matches in South Korea that awards US$10,000 to the seasonal champion.

He won the biggest amount of prize money ever turned out in a WarCraft III competition in Moscow, Russia by winning Game-X. He has also won in China, one of which was considered to be attended by almost all top tier professional Warcraft III players; the World Series of Video Games stop in Wuhan, China. Moon won over US$130,000 in prize money in 2007.

=== 2008 Legendary Status ===
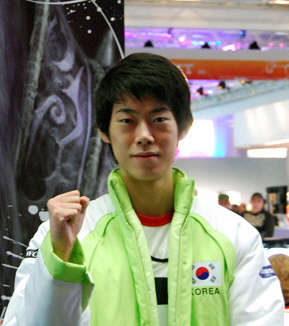
Jang at WCG 2008 Grand Final

Jang Jae-ho started his year with a second-place finish in the Chinese tournament, PGL behind the upcoming Chinese human player TH000. He then went on to win the Blizzard Worldwide Invitational beating at this time the world's best Orc player Lyn in a best 2 out of 3 sets series. The next week he won his second title of the year the ESWC Masters of Paris beating his arch Rival Li "Sky" XiaoFeng in the finals. Although, highly favored to win the ESWC title and solidifying his position as the world's best player, he was knocked out in the group stages alongside his teammate Grubby. However, he managed to qualify for the World Cyber Games taking second place in his country for the second time in a row. At the global finals, he made it to the grand finals only to lose at the hands of his teammate Grubby, the series was widely regarded as the clash of the titans as both Moon and Grubby are the highest earners in terms of prize money. He recently showed that his loss to Grubby did not affect his confidence and managed to win the IEF 2008 tournament in Wuhan beating his arch-rival Li "Sky" XiaoFeng again. On the way, he also defeated French professional player Yoan "ToD" Merlo 3–0 in the group stages.

With the tides turning in racial balance even Moon himself admitted that "Orc was imba", but he has fought on becoming one of the only Night Elf players still able to withstand the Orcish monopoly. However his status not only extends to his playing style but also for the content of his character, known and respected for being humble despite his level of stardom, and even revealed he still lives with his grandmother despite international success.

However, ESNation licensed the franchise rights for all MeetYourMakers teams to Frontspawn ApS, resulting in the MYM WarCraft team being released immediately. The franchisee relaunched the MYM WarCraft team but without Moon on the roster. It was later revealed that Moon had signed a three-year contract with the Korean team WeMade FOX for $500,000 which made him the highest paid esports player at the time, a title which was previously held by Korean professional gamer NaDa (who was also a member of WeMadeFox).

=== Switch to StarCraft II ===
Moon started playing Starcraft II competitive following its release, but it was only after his switch recruitment to Fnatic on January 17, 2012, that he became a full-time player. His first notable achievement was making it into the GOMTV Global Starcraft II League Open Season 2. He has since had little success in the GSL, but has done better in non-Korean tournaments, placing second at the Intel Extreme Masters 5, and being one of the Koreans to play in the North American Star League. Moon also played in the 2011 Summer DreamHack LAN where he placed second, losing the Grand Finals to LiquidHuk for 2–3. He placed 2nd at the IPL4 Pacific Qualifiers, losing to MarineKingPrime. As a result of his achievements in WarCraft 3 and Starcraft 2, he was inducted into the ESL esports Hall of Fame on 7 July 2019.

== Awards ==
=== Won ===
- 2008 Esports Award Best Warcraft 3 Player
- 2008 ESports Award Korea Player of the Year
- 2007 KeSPA Greatest WarCraft III Player Award
- 2007 GGL Warcraft 3 Player of the Year
- 2006 KeSPA Greatest WarCraft III Player Award
- 2005 KeSPA Greatest WarCraft III Player Award

=== Nominated ===
- 2007 ESports Award Best Warcraft 3 Player
- 2006 GGL Warcraft 3 Player of the Year
- 2006 Gosugamers GosuGamer of the Year
- 2006 ESports Award Best Warcraft 3 Player
- 2005 ESports Award eSports Player of the Year
- 2005 ESports Award Best Warcraft 3 Player
