= World Cyber Games 2009 =

International esports event

The 2009 World Cyber Games (also known as WCG 09 or World Cyber Games 09) took place from November 11 to November 15, 2009, in Chengdu, Sichuan, China. It had over 600 participates from 70 countries taking part. The prize money is estimated at around $500,000.

== Official Games ==
Warcraft III, StarCraft, Counter Strike, FIFA 09, Carom3D, Red Stone and TrackMania Nations Forever on PC Guitar Hero: World Tour and Virtua Fighter 5 on Xbox 360 Asphalt4 and Wise Star 2 on Mobile

== Competition Draw ==
The Competition Draws took place on October 19, October 20 and October 21. All competition draws took place on one of these three days.

- Oct. 19: Asphalt 4 > Wise Star 2 > Counter-Strike
- Oct. 20: Guitar Hero > Virtua Fighter 5 > FIFA 09
- Oct. 21: Carom 3D - > Trackmania Nations Forever - > StarCraft - > Warcraft III

== Results ==
=== Official ===
Event	Gold		Silver		Bronze	
WarCraft III : The Frozen Throne	(China) Wang Xuwen (Infi)		(China) Lu Weiliang (Fly100%)		(South Korea) Park June (Lyn)	
Counter-Strike 1.6	AGAiN (Poland)	Jakub Gurczynski (kuben)	fnatic (Sweden)	Patrik Sättermon (cArn)	Mortal Teamwork (Denmark)	Alexander Holdt (ave)
Counter-Strike 1.6	AGAiN (Poland)	Lukasz Wnek (LUq)	fnatic (Sweden)	Patrik Lindberg (f0rest)	Mortal Teamwork (Denmark)	Christoffer Sunde (Sunde)
Counter-Strike 1.6	AGAiN (Poland)	Wiktor Wojtas (Taz)	fnatic (Sweden)	Rasmus Ståhl (Gux)	Mortal Teamwork (Denmark)	Danny Sørensen (zonic)
Counter-Strike 1.6	AGAiN (Poland)	Mariusz Cybulski (Loord)	fnatic (Sweden)	Harley Örwall (dsn)	Mortal Teamwork (Denmark)	Oliver Ari Minet (minet)
Counter-Strike 1.6	AGAiN (Poland)	Filip Kubski (neo)	fnatic (Sweden)	Christopher Alesund (GeT_RiGhT)	Mortal Teamwork (Denmark)	Martin Heldt (trace)
TrackMania Nations Forever	(Sweden) Jesper Karjalainen (KarjeN)		(Sweden) Kalle Mortlund Videkull (FrostBeule)		(Norway) Fredrik Bergmann (Bergie)	
StarCraft: Brood War	(South Korea) Jae-Dong Lee (Jaedong)		(South Korea) Byung-Gu Song (Stork)		(South Korea) Taek-Yong Kim (Bisu)	
FIFA 09	(Germany) Joshua Begehr (SK_Kr0ne)		(Germany) Daniel Schellhase (SK_hero)		(Poland) Piotr Zajkowski (Pio)	
Red Stone	ComeonBaby (South Korea)	Ki-Pyo Kang	HAPPY_SWEETS (Japan)	Hiroto Watanabe	Cool_Runnings (United States)	Jon Lunceford
Red Stone	ComeonBaby (South Korea)	Seung-Ryul Kim	HAPPY_SWEETS (Japan)	Shouta Ueda	Cool_Runnings (United States)	Matt Marcou
Red Stone	ComeonBaby (South Korea)	Sung-Min Song	HAPPY_SWEETS (Japan)	Kuniaki Kitagawa	Cool_Runnings (United States)	Sean Snack
Red Stone	ComeonBaby (South Korea)	Tae-Seok Kim	HAPPY_SWEETS (Japan)	Tomohiro Takami	Cool_Runnings (United States)	Colin Fogle
Carom3D	(South Korea) Hee-Chul Kim (MARCJACOBS)		(Brazil) Jean Monico (jeantek)		(Germany) Andreas Krieger (Protonski)	
Virtua Fighter 5	(Japan) Keita Ai (FOOD)		(South Korea) Eui-Wook Shin (ShinZ_Km)		(South Korea) Dae-Hwan Kim (Rikojjang)	
Guitar Hero World Tour	(Brazil) Fabio Jardim (caiomenudo13)		(United States) Michael Najman (MoB_Shift)		(United States) Robert Michaels (vVv smokyprogg)	
Wise Star 2	(Italy) Enrico Aurora (a.Enrico)		(France) Christophe Limet (Blackbelt)		(United States) Trevor Housten (TorcH)	
Asphalt4 : Elite Racing	(Taiwan) Liu You-chen (TER_BURBERRYqq)		(Singapore) Jared Beins (slyfoxlover)		(South Korea) Won-Joon Lee (KimBuJa)	

=== Promotion ===
Event	Gold	Silver	Bronze
Dungeon and Fighter	(South Korea) Jong-Min Jeong (UraniumHwangjaeM)	(Japan) Shun Ishikawa (CLAY)	(South Korea) Je-Myung Lee (Marenobba)

== Sponsors ==
Samsung Electronics (Worldwide Partner)

== Official theme song ==
The official theme song of the World Cyber Games is called "Beyond the Game" and the title is also the name of the World Cyber Games Motto.

== Videos ==
The World Cyber Games published the different events on their YouTube account and their site.
