= World Cyber Games 2011 =

Esports competition in Busan, South Korea

The 2011 World Cyber Games (also known as WCG 2011) took place from 8 December to 11 December 2011 in Busan, South Korea.

The event has been described as hosting the first international League of Legends competition.

== Official games ==
=== PC games ===
- Counter-Strike 1.6
- CrossFire (developed by Smile Gate)
- FIFA 11
- League of Legends
- Special Force (developed by Dragonfly) (service name Soldier Front in the United States)
- StarCraft II: Wings of Liberty
- Warcraft III: The Frozen Throne
- World of Warcraft: Cataclysm

=== Xbox 360 games ===
- Tekken 6

=== Mobile games ===
- Asphalt 6: Adrenaline

=== Promotion games ===
- Carom 3D
- Dungeon & Fighter
- Lost Saga

== Results ==
=== Official ===
Event	Gold		Silver		Bronze	
Asphalt 6: Adrenaline	(Taiwan) Chang Yung-Chi (IPE-Dark)		(Brazil) Sergio Faria (SOFt)		(Poland) Kamil Zalewski (PLANET)	
Counter-Strike 1.6	ESC Gaming (Poland)	Jarosław Jarząbkowski (pasha)	SK-Gaming (Sweden)	Christopher Alesund (GeT_RiGhT)	Moscow Five (Russia)	Alexander Zobkov (xek)
Counter-Strike 1.6	ESC Gaming (Poland)	Filip Kubski (NEO)	SK-Gaming (Sweden)	Patrik Lindberg (f0rest)	Moscow Five (Russia)	Mihail Stolyarov (Dosia)
Counter-Strike 1.6	ESC Gaming (Poland)	Jakub Gurczynski (kuben)	SK-Gaming (Sweden)	Robert Dahlström (RobbaN)	Moscow Five (Russia)	Eduard Ivanov (ed1k)
Counter-Strike 1.6	ESC Gaming (Poland)	Wiktor Wojtas (TaZ)	SK-Gaming (Sweden)	Johan Klasson (face)	Moscow Five (Russia)	Sergey Stolyarov (Fox)
Counter-Strike 1.6	ESC Gaming (Poland)	Mariusz Cybulski (Loord)	SK-Gaming (Sweden)	Marcus Larsson (Delpan)	Moscow Five (Russia)	Roman Makarov (ROMJkE)
Cross Fire	Liaoning_Dongjia (China)	Lang Shuai (70KGBLL)	HAMMERTIME (United States)	Tyler Newmister (15oL)	ruLegends (Russia)	Sergei Novikov (friker)
Cross Fire	Liaoning_Dongjia (China)	Xu Hongyu (LEE)	HAMMERTIME (United States)	Andrew Miloslavsky (Maverick)	ruLegends (Russia)	Alexey Litvinov (spenkoo)
Cross Fire	Liaoning_Dongjia (China)	Li Yang (Sir)	HAMMERTIME (United States)	Hunter Young (naos)	ruLegends (Russia)	Maxim Shishak (volumftw)
Cross Fire	Liaoning_Dongjia (China)	Zheng Pengfei (Even)	HAMMERTIME (United States)	Brandon Parker (brando)	ruLegends (Russia)	Alexandr Serikov (gnusnus)
Cross Fire	Liaoning_Dongjia (China)	Feng Yongqiang (N1ce)	HAMMERTIME (United States)	Garrett Young (Monstar)	ruLegends (Russia)	Vladislav Chernoivanov (vampiree)
FIFA Soccer 2011	(Germany) Kai Wollin (deto)		(Poland) Bartosz Piętka (hom3r)		(Italy) Mattia Guarracino (Lonewolf92)	
League of Legends	Chicks Dig Elo (United States)	Steve Chau (Chauster)	Gameburg (Poland)	Marcin Marczak (Cinku)	Counter Logic Gaming (Canada)	Michael Tang (bigfatlp)
League of Legends	Chicks Dig Elo (United States)	Andy Dinh (Reginald)	Gameburg (Poland)	Mateusz Szkudlarek (Kikis)	Counter Logic Gaming (Canada)	Cody Sigfusson (Elementz)
League of Legends	Chicks Dig Elo (United States)	Alex Chu (Xpecial)	Gameburg (Poland)	Konrad Kukier (Mokatte)	Counter Logic Gaming (Canada)	Brian Wyllie (TheOddOne)
League of Legends	Chicks Dig Elo (United States)	Marcus Hill (Dyrus)	Gameburg (Poland)	Krystian Przybylski (Czaru)	Counter Logic Gaming (Canada)	Shan Huang (Chaox)
League of Legends	Chicks Dig Elo (United States)	Brandon DiMarco (Saintvicious)	Gameburg (Poland)	Marek Kukier (Makler)	Counter Logic Gaming (Canada)	George Georgallidis (HotshotGG)
Special Force	AnnuL (South Korea)	Chang-Sun Kim (AnnuLNAM)	Amotel (Thailand)	Chiravut Meethong (meethong)	WAYI Spider (Taiwan)	Chun-Chien Liu (TW_Spd_Wiz)
Special Force	AnnuL (South Korea)	Seung-Gyu Na (AnnuLNa)	Amotel (Thailand)	Vuttinan Meethong (supavachara)	WAYI Spider (Taiwan)	Hsun Ying (TW_Spd_Bolt)
Special Force	AnnuL (South Korea)	Seung-Eun Kim (AnnuLKiM)	Amotel (Thailand)	Weerachai Supavachara (penpipatkul)	WAYI Spider (Taiwan)	Jia-Hao Li (TW_Spd_IAN)
Special Force	AnnuL (South Korea)	Seong-Woo Hong (AnnuLSSUN)	Amotel (Thailand)	Wannasak Penpipatkul (kumraksa)	WAYI Spider (Taiwan)	Guan-Heng Lin (TW_Spd_Leo)
Special Force	AnnuL (South Korea)	Hong-Woo Nam (AnnuLHONG)	Amotel (Thailand)	Preeda Kumraksa (jongrak)	WAYI Spider (Taiwan)	Sian-Chih Wang (TW_Spd_King)
StarCraft II: Wings of Liberty	(South Korea) Jung Jong-Hyun (Mvp)		(China) Wang Lei (XiGua)		(Ukraine) Mihaylo Hayda (Kas)	
Tekken 6	(Japan) Daichi Nakayama (NOBI)		(South Korea) Sung-Guk An (dejavu)		(South Korea) Hyun-Jin Kim (JDCR)	
WarCraft III: The Frozen Throne	(South Korea) June Park (PanDa.Lyn)		(China) Li Xiaofeng (WE.GIGABYTE.Sky )		(China) Lu Weiliang (Fly100%)	
World of WarCraft	OMG (South Korea)	Oh Jeong-Min (Goochi)	Kimchi_Man (South Korea)	Park Chang-Gyu (ADOUKEN)	Anarchy-DKP (Taiwan)	Chang-Ru Song
World of WarCraft	OMG (South Korea)	Jeong Ji-Yong (Sleeping)	Kimchi_Man (South Korea)	Shin Jong-Mun (Shotky)	Anarchy-DKP (Taiwan)	Hao-Wei Li
World of WarCraft	OMG (South Korea)	Jeong Ji-Hwan (Jungyup)	Kimchi_Man (South Korea)	Yoon Seung-Taek (Eryuk)	Anarchy-DKP (Taiwan)	Jing-Yang Tao

=== Promotion ===
Event	Gold		Silver		Bronze		4th qualified	
Carom 3D	(Bulgaria) Iliyan Ivanov Kiryakov (InmORtall)		(Brazil) Diego Adelino da Paz (Diieego)		(India) Prince Johal (HI_ISTLER)		(Portugal) TwinS_KluB	
Dungeon & Fighter (1v1)	(South Korea) Sang-Cheon Jeong (Jeongsangcheon)		(China) Dongsheng Qiu (YEMENQIU)		(South Korea) Jae-Hyung Choi (cjh1025)			
Dungeon & Fighter (3v3)	Dream Team (South Korea)	Jin-Seong Lee	Bixu Heima (China)	Zhixun Zhang				
Dungeon & Fighter (3v3)	Dream Team (South Korea)	Seung-Jun Kim	Bixu Heima (China)	Zhiyu Yan				
Dungeon & Fighter (3v3)	Dream Team (South Korea)	Jae-Won Jang	Bixu Heima (China)	Diangtao Huang				
Lost Saga	Team Korea (South Korea)	Joon-Yong Sun	The Foot Clan (United States)	Eric Moore	Fire Cyber (Indonesia)	Aship Na	Entourage; Team Spain	Borja 'hzeros' Pérez
Lost Saga	Team Korea (South Korea)	Sun-Woo Kim	The Foot Clan (United States)	Joshua Thomas	Fire Cyber (Indonesia)	Muhammad Lathif	Entourage; Team Spain	Alberto 'Silverfall' Garrido
Lost Saga	Team Korea (South Korea)	Jin-Seok Lee	The Foot Clan (United States)	Scott Pierre	Fire Cyber (Indonesia)	Muhamad Rizal Firmansyah	Entourage; Team Spain	Antonio 'GalianA' Galiana
