= ToD =

French video gamer

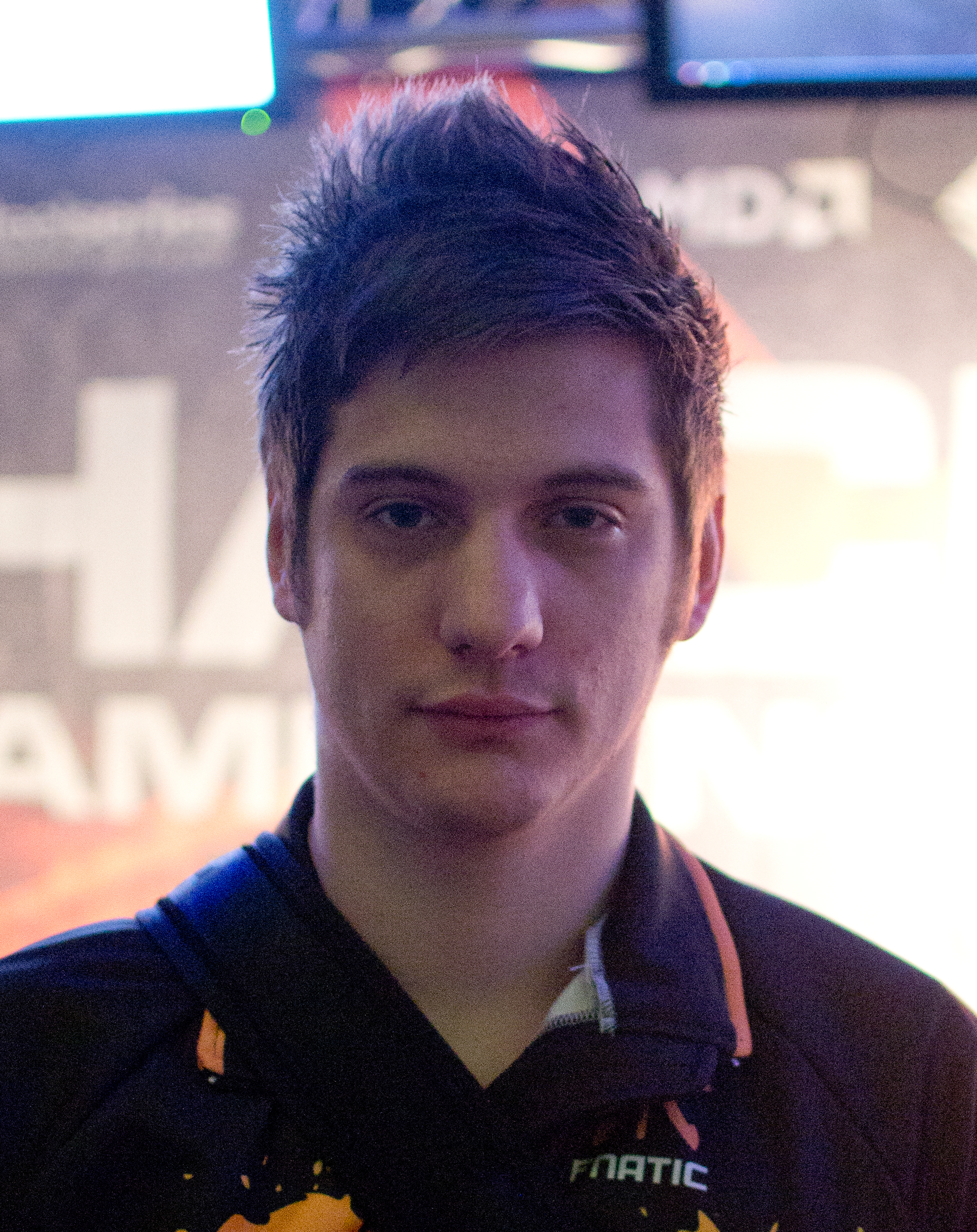
- Merlo in 2012

Personal information
- Name: Yoan Merlo
- Nationality: French

Career information
- Games: Warcraft III; Starcraft II
- Playing career: 2002–present

Yoan "ToD" Merlo is a French former professional player of the real-time strategy games Warcraft III and Starcraft II. In WarCraft III he played as the Human race, and in StarCraft he played as the Protoss. He was signed to the top esports team in the United Kingdom, 4Kings, until 7 November 2007, when he decided not to renew his contract for unspecified reasons. He later explained in an interview that the dissatisfying results of the Four Kings team were the reason for his departure. After much speculation, Merlo unexpectedly joined the team Mousesports on 1 December 2007.

He is a former Warcraft III professional competitive player, holding among other achievements first places at the World e-Sports Games, Blizzard Worldwide Invitational and Cyberathlete Professional League competitions. He is also a World Cyber Games silver and bronze medalist.

In an interview with GOMTV.net, an esports organization based in Seoul, South Korea, he hinted at his interest in competing in Starcraft 2. He achieved moderate success, winning some small tournaments and qualifying for World Cyber Games 2011.

== Warcraft III career ==
=== Rise in France (2002–2003) ===
Prior to playing Warcraft III, Yoan played such games as Starcraft: Brood War and Counter-Strike, he cites twofold Starcraft World Cyber Games champion Lim "BoxeR" Yo-hwan as the reason he plays the Human race. He started high level competitive Warcraft III after joining French based ArmaTeam, at the time a high level competitive gaming team sponsored by Intel. While representing the team, he took fourth place at the 2003 Electronic Sports World Cup.

Following this strong result he joined SK Gaming around August 2003 as ArmaTeam was facing internal problems at the time. Around this time, he was competing in tournaments around the globe, such as those organized by the Cyberathlete Professional League and Cyber X Games, something which he continues to do until today. After six months, he returned to ArmaTeam because he preferred to compete with his friends in Paris rather than with the globally diverse members of SK Gaming.

=== A year in South Korea (2004–2005) ===
Several months after re-joining ArmaTeam, he was asked to join the European-based Warcraft III squad of the United Kingdom-based team 4Kings in order to stay in and compete in the "mecca" of professional gaming, South Korea. On 16 September 2004 the team consisting of Manuel Schenkhuizen, Dae Hui Cho, Sebastian "FuRy" Pesic and Ivica "Zeus[19]" Markovic took residence in Seoul and Merlo joined several televised competitions such as those hosted by Ongamenet and MBCGame. He was the most successful Four Kings player in these televised leagues.

His reputation grew strongly during his time in the country, Merlo took third place at the 2004 World Cyber Games and second place at the 2005 Samsung European Championships and would stay in South-Korea for almost a full year competing in two seasons of the World e-Sports Games following the closing of the before mentioned televised leagues. At this time, the Warcraft III squad of Four Kings became known as the world's premier competitive Warcraft III team, going undefeated in the Warcraft 3 Champions League for over a full season and being recognized as the esport team of the year in the 2005 eSports Awards.

=== Return to France (2005–2006) ===
Upon returning to France in late 2005, he finished the 2005 season by qualifying for and competing in the World Cyber Games 2005, where he took fourth place. The following year, he would once again take second place at the Samsung European Championship before embarking on a one-month tournament in Hangzhou, China: the Master edition of the World e-Sports Games. Merlo would surprise many by taking home the first-place prize of US$31,000, at the time the biggest prize ever awarded for a Warcraft III competition. He would continue to show strong results throughout the season as he took second place at major tournaments in China, such as the World e-Sports Festival and KODE5. He finished the year by taking second place at the World Cyber Games 2006, losing to Li "Sky" Xiaofeng in the finals.

=== Move to China (2006–2007) ===
China was significantly growing at this time as an important country for Warcraft III competitions, and in 2006, Merlo was frequently visiting tournaments there as well as using the country as grounds to train. In September 2006, he took up permanent residence in the country. He resided in Beijing, China, together with Swedish professional gamer Kim "SaSe" Hammar, which allowed them to train in China as well as have an easier time competing in the country's many competitions.

His successes still mainly came from international competition, however. In early 2007, he once again took second place at the Samsung European Championship as well as first place in the Electronic Sports League's Extreme Masters. He would win one of the biggest tournaments of the year in the Blizzard Worldwide Invitational, and also quite notably declined to compete in several competitions.

He declined to participate in the Electronic Sports World Cup because he would have to travel between China and France twice in order to qualify. He also declined to participate in the World e-Sports Games eStars in Seoul, South Korea. Before agreeing to compete, he specified two conditions, which he claimed were agreed to but not met when he arrived to compete. Claiming to be pressured into a response after this apparent miscommunication, he declined to participate, dissatisfied with the organisation of the tournament, a feat which received both criticism for his demanding nature and praise for not accepting the false promises of the tournament organisers. It is widely known in the community ToD was "game dodging".

He was recognized as the player of the year 2007.

== Starcraft II career ==
Yoan began playing StarCraft II: Wings of Liberty during its beta but wouldn't officially switch to the game until late 2010. His playstyle relies on strong micromanagement, inherited from his Warcraft III experience. He joined Millenium on 9 January 2011. ToD quickly proved himself one of the best French players by taking the second place of Spirit Lan 8. On 1 May 2011, ToD and Millenium decided to end their collaboration, explaining that they were disappointed by each other's work.

ToD participated in eOSL Summer 2011, where he managed to come out of his group in first place, and was eventually eliminated in the semifinals by SarenS. He then won 3–0 against Origine in order to finish in third place. He also competed in HomeStory Cup III, which was the first major offline event he participated in during his StarCraft II career. Despite showing an impressive level in the group stage, with a victory against ThorZaIN, ToD was quickly eliminated in the playoffs after encountering the future winners HuK and SaSe.

In July, ToD successfully got the French spot for World Cyber Games 2011, after his victories against Adelscott and SarenS at the WCG Qualifiers France. After this successful bout of LAN events, ToD rejoined Millenium. At the end of the month, he narrowly defeated his teammate Adelscott in order to win ESL Pro Series France X.

Then, he participated in the open bracket of the MLG Anaheim 2011. He began the tournament with an unexpected 2–0 victory over the South Korean top Protoss player Alicia, but was then knocked out of the upper bracket by CatZ. Nevertheless, ToD made his way through the lower bracket, beating Alicia again, as well as OpTiKzErO and Stalife. He was finally eliminated in the main bracket by another top Protoss South Korean player, Choya.

On 8 September, ToD left Millenium for the second time in four months. The same day, he announced on his stream that he was planning to practice in Korea for several months. On 10 September, it was announced that ToD had joined Fnatic.

During the weeks before his departure for Korea, ToD had a string of successful achievements. In September, he was invited to SCAN Invitational 1, where he knocked out Strelok and TLO in order to reach the final against his former teammate Stephano, whom he couldn't defeat, therefore taking second place in the tournament. Two weeks later, ToD participated in the Samsung European Championship 2011 in Poland. He managed again to reach the final against a Zerg player, this time being Nerchio, and was able to defeat him in a tied series. The next week, ToD was back in France in order to compete in the first event of the French Master Series 2011 - 2012, the PxL-Lan 31. Seen as the favourite of the event by the commentators, thanks to the non-attendance of most of the best French players, he made a clean run to the finals, and swept an unexpected Kamikaze to claim the win of the tournament.

ToD spent the last months of 2011 in South Korea, where he attended World Cyber Games 2011 in December. His run in this event was short-lived, with a 1–5 record in the group stage, which resulted in ToD ending up in last place in his group. He wasn't any more successful at attempting to qualify for the 2012 GSL Season 1 one month later, as he was stopped in the preliminaries by Creator.

On 5 March ToD joined the Fnatic Gaming House. On 15 July ToD parted ways with Fnatic. About 1 month later, on 11 August, ToD found a new team and joined ROOT Gaming. On 6 December ToD left ROOT on good terms, returning to France after failing to acquire a work visa in the United States.

On 21 July 2012, ToD participated in the IGN Pro League (IPL) 5 European Satellite Qualifiers. ToD received a BYE in round one and then went on to take down UserStupid in order to advance into the finals to face White-Ra. In the finals, ToD defeated White-Ra by a score of 1-0 and was able to take first place. His first-place finish qualified him for the IGN ProLeague Season 5.

== Casting career ==
After casting at multiple WCS events, ToD joined ESL full-time in 2016 to do casting for Starcraft II and Heroes of the Storm events. In 2020 he was the commentator for the IEM Katowice 2020 Startcraft II event, and in 2021 he was the streams guest commentator for IEM Katowice 2021 Starcraft II event.
