= Lyn (gamer) =

South Korean professional gamer

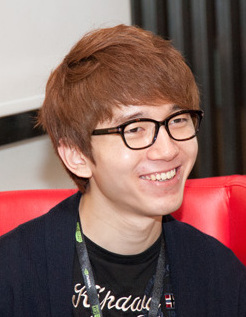

Personal information
- Name: Park June
- Nationality: South Korean

Career information
- Games: Warcraft III; StarCraft II

Career highlights and awards
- WCG champion (2011)

Park "Lyn" June (Korean: 박준) is a professional StarCraft II Terran player and former Warcraft III Orc player from South Korea. Lyn was a successful Warcraft III player before transitioning to StarCraft II. He is the only player to have won almost all of the premier tournaments, including the World Cyber Games, Electronic Sports World Cup, BlizzCon and Intel Extreme Masters. The only two premier tournaments which he has never won are the World e-Sports Games and International E-Sports Festival, instead placing second in the World e-Sports Games in 2008 and 2010, and in the International E-Sports Festival in 2007. The total prize money Lyn has won playing Warcraft 3 is behind only Jang "moon" Jae-ho.

== Game style ==
Lyn is the first player to use the Blade Master as the core hero and to purchase cheap items that increase the stats of the Blade Master.

== E-sport biography ==
=== Warcraft III ===
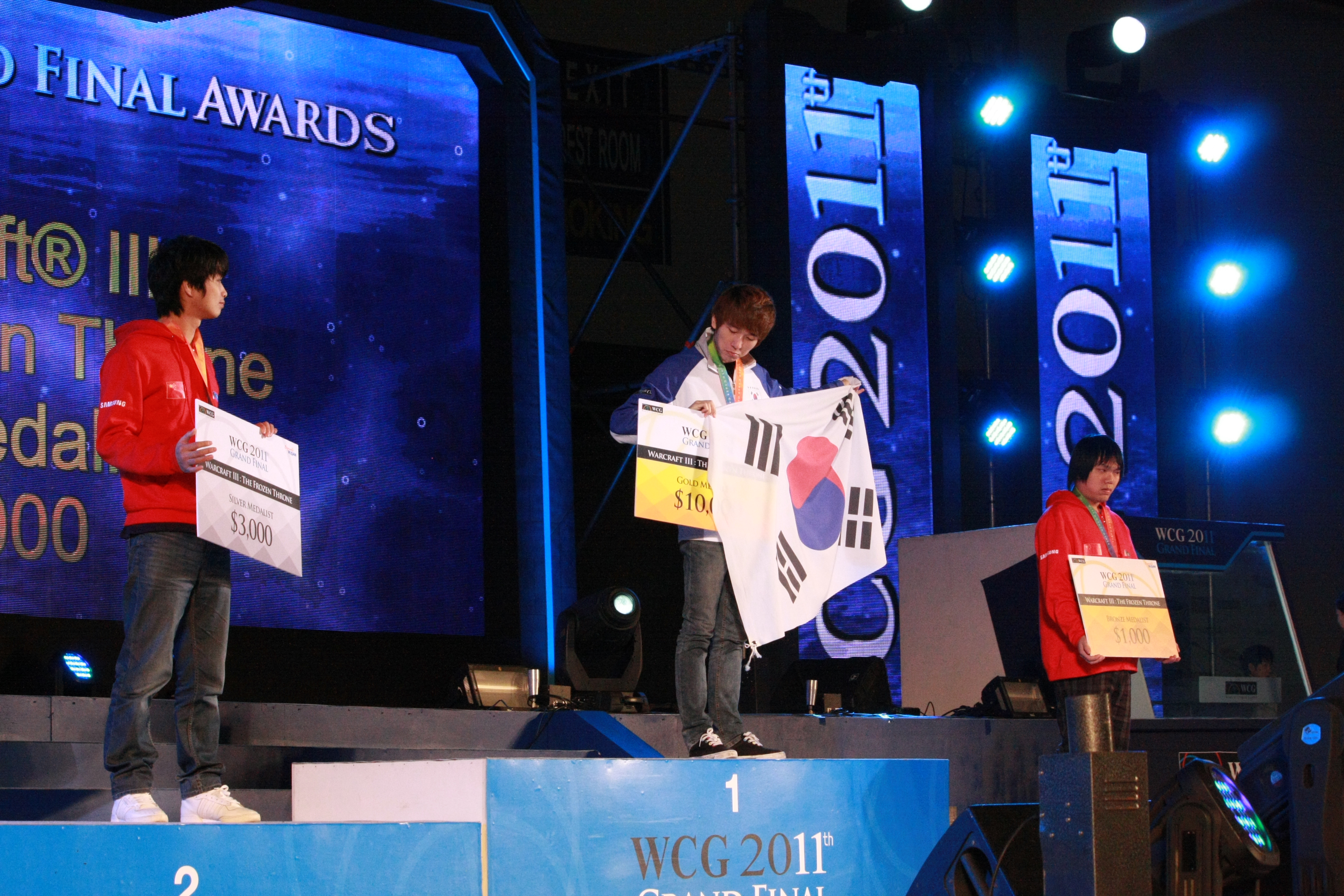
Park (center) won the World Cyber Games 2011 Warcraft III event.

Lyn started his career in the Chinese team World Elite. Then he joined the Swedish team SK-Gaming and Korean team WeMade FOX.

Lyn won the Intel Extreme Master Global Challenge in Los Angeles in 2007 and the Intel Extreme Master World Championship in 2008.

Lyn won BlizzCon 2008 and 2009 as well as taking third in the World Cyber Games 2009 and 2010. Although active in Warcraft III, he and his WeMade FOX teammate Moon began to practice StarCraft II in late 2010. Lyn won almost $150,000 between 2007 and 2009. In 2010, Lyn got the champion of Electronic Sports World Cup

On August 31, 2011, Lyn, along with the rest of the players of WeMade FOX, was left without a team as WeMade Entertainment closed its electronic sports program. On September 10, it was announced that Lyn was joining the Chinese team PanDa.

On December 11, 2011, Lyn won the World Cyber Games 2011 Warcraft III event.

On April 19, 2012, Lyn announced that he has left Team PanDa.

On May 24, 2012, it was announced that Lyn has joined Chinese professional gaming Team DK as a StarCraft II player.

=== StarCraft II ===
Lyn was able to qualify for two of the three GOMTV Global StarCraft II League open seasons but was eliminated in the Round of 64 on both occasions. His two qualifications allowed him to gain Code A and participate in the first 2011 January GSL Code A Tournament. Lyn managed to reach the round of 4, besting Moon along the way, which allowed him to play in the Up/Down Placement matches for the February Code S tournament. He defeated Polt 2-0 and as such, is set to participate as a Code S player in the following season.

==== GSL ====
Lyn's debuted in Code S for GSL March. He advanced through the group stages with a 2–1 score and eliminated Ensnare 2–0 in the Round of 16. anypro would ultimately defeat Lyn in the quarterfinals 3–1.

During GSL May, Lyn left the group stages in third place with a 1–2 score. In the up/down matches, Lyn was defeated by both Bomber and Ensnare to send him once again to Code A.

==== China ====
Lyn appeared in G-League Season 2 after defeating XiGua, despite being sent to the loser's bracket by him earlier. From the loser's bracket he managed to climb all the way to the grand finals, where he beat LoveCD to win his first title in StarCraft II.

In the third season, he was unable to advance out of the group stage.

He qualified for NEO Star League Season 1 Round of 16, finishing the group stage with a strong 7–0 series record, but was then defeated 3-0 by the eventual 3rd-place finisher Toodming in the Round of 8.
