= World e-Sports Games =

Discontinued competition

- Sport: Esports
- Founded: 2004
- Folded: 2010

The World e-Sports Masters (WEM) was an international competitive gaming event organized by the Hangzhou eSport Culture & Sport Communication Company, Ltd. Prize money was awarded to winning individuals and teams. It was first held in 2005 under the World e-Sports Games.

The World eSports Games, Inc. was founded in 2004 by Paul Chong. Headquartered in Seoul, the first three games were held in South Korea in 2005. A year later, the event moved to Hangzhou where it was renamed the World e-Sports Games Masters. In 2007, WEG again returned to Seoul to host the World e-Sports Games e-Stars, but moved back to China for the 2008 season of what is now the World e-Sports Masters. Since then, it has been held annually (except for 2011), instead of year-round. OnGameNet is the current rightsholder to the World e-Sports Masters franchise.

== History ==
=== World e-Sport Games ===
The inaugural World e-Sports Games took place in 2005 from January 30 through March 20. and featured Counter-Strike and Warcraft III: Reign of Chaos as main titles. Players resided in Seoul, South Korea throughout most of the tournament and matches were broadcast on Korean television. The finals took place in Beijing, China. Attendees were all invited based on past performances and included the likes of Jang "Moon" Jae Ho, Team NoA and Li "Sky" Xiaofeng. The prize purse for both competitions totalled US$138,000. Eight Counter-Strike teams and sixteen WarCraft III players participated.

The second edition took place from May 30 to July 1, 2005 and was in most aspects comparable to the first edition except that qualifiers to determine the attendees took place in South Korea.

The third edition took place from October 19 to December 11, 2005. It was in most aspects comparable with the first two editions except that only the top three of the second edition was invited with the remainder of participants having to qualify. This edition also clashed with the World Cyber Games, causing several notable players to decline participating including Gediminas "WinneR" Rimkus the third-place finisher in the WarCraft III competition of the second edition.

The number of WarCraft III players attending was reduced from sixteen to twelve in the third edition.

=== WEG Masters and WEG e-Stars ===
A renewed version of the World e-Sports Games featuring Counter-Strike, StarCraft and WarCraft III was to take place in Seoul, South-Korea in August 2007.

=== World e-Sports Masters ===
Another edition of the World e-Sports Games titled 'World E-Sports Masters' was held in Hangzhou, China from October 26 till November 2 (2008) and will feature eight professional Counter-Strike teams as well as eight professional WarCraft III players competing for a US$100,000 prize pool. After three seasons, the tournament was renamed the World eSports Masters, and moved to Hangzhou, China. As of 2012, the tournament hosts competitions for Starcraft 2 and League of Legends.

== Results ==
=== Counter-Strike ===
	Gold	Silver	Bronze
WEG I	NoA	4Kings	Mousesports
WEG II	Begrip.swe	Catch-Gamer	4Kings
WEG III	wNv.gm	project_kr	team9.no
WEG Masters	wNv.gm	compLexity	hacker.project
WEM 2008	mTw.dk	Mousesports	eSTRO
WEM 2009	Fnatic	Power-Gaming	TyLoo
WEM 2010	WeMade FOX	SK Gaming	FX

=== League of Legends ===
	Gold	Silver	Bronze
WEM 2012	Team WE	Invictus Gaming	Team Acer

=== StarCraft II: Wings of Liberty ===
	Gold	Silver	Bronze
WEM 2012	Lee "Leenock" Dong Nyoung	Park "JYP" Jin Young	Han "aLive" Lee Seok

=== WarCraft III ===
	Gold	Silver	Bronze
WEG I	Moon	Zacard	Sky
WEG II	Moon	Gostop	WinneR
WEG III	Sweet	Gostop	Lucifer
WEG Masters	ToD	Grubby	Sky
WEM 2008	Infi	Lyn	Grubby
WEM 2009	Grubby	Moon	SocceR
WEM 2010	TH000	Lyn	TeD
