= MaDFroG =

Former eSports Player

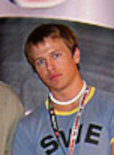
- Johansson in 2004

Personal information
- Name: Fredrik Johansson
- Nationality: Swedish

Career information
- Games: Warcraft III; StarCraft II
- Playing career: 2001–2005 (Warcraft III); 2010–2011 (StarCraft II)

Fredrik Johansson, better known by the pseudonym MaDFroG, is a retired Swedish Warcraft III and StarCraft II player.

He was a prominent Undead player, achieving success in numerous tournaments. His gameplay often emphasized the use of gargoyles against Night Elf opponents, a strategy that was widely recognized in competitive play.

Fredrik Johansson is featured in the documentary film Beyond the Game.

== Warcraft III Career ==
=== Early recognition ===
His talent as a competitive real-time strategy gamer was noticeable at an early age, he finished third in the StarCraft: Brood War Nations tournament at the first World Cyber Games in 2001 representing Sweden.

When Warcraft III: Reign of Chaos became one of the world's premier competitive games in 2003, Johansson was recognized as one of its most talented players and recruited by professional gaming team SK Gaming.

Showing strong results in online competitions, he gained true recognition as one of the world's best after becoming the runner-up of the 2003 Electronic Sports World Cup and he, as well a number of his teammates, were offered a chance to participate in televised South Korean competitions by Intel Korea.

=== Stay in South Korea ===
The environment in Seoul, South Korea, known unofficially as the "mecca" of professional gaming, suited him well and he improved as a player. During the first part of his stay he had some success in Korean competitions, finishing third in the Kbk Jeju Tournament, but he did not feel satisfied with what he had achieved.

When his teammates returned to their respective countries by the end of 2003, Johansson remained in the country. A few months later he won the 2004 Blizzard Worldwide Invitational in Warcraft III: The Frozen Throne, picking up US$25,000.

This cemented his status as the strongest western player in his respective game and as one of the strongest players in South Korea. This prompted the professional Korean gaming team Sonokong/Frienz to invite him to join, which he accepted.

His new teammates included several of the most recognized professional Warcraft III players of their time, with accomplishments in Korean leagues such as winning OGN's SUMA Pro-League and the MBC Clan Team Battle.

=== Return to Sweden ===
Feeling satisfied with his results, he returned to Sweden and rejoined SK Gaming after staying in Seoul for 11 months. He would once again represent his country at the Electronic Sports World Cup (ESWC) and finished second again, losing to Dae Hui Cho in the finals.

He was recognized as the greatest competitive gamer of the year 2004 by a panel of experts, and received the first of the "eSports Player of the Year" awards that have been award annually since 2004.

Afterwards his motivation for the game dropped, and he announced his retirement twice in February and October 2005 at respectively the World e-Sport Games in South Korea and after BlizzCon in the United States. Ever since he has not participated in any competitions, but he did announce his return as an amateur gamer in April 2007.

=== Warcraft III Invitational ===
Johansson returned to the Warcraft III scene when participating in the Warcraft two-day event "Warcraft III invitational" in 2018.

=== Gameplay ===
Madfrog's gameplay style has been highly influential on the Undead race. Madfrog's tactics often involved hit and run guerilla tactics targeted at disrupting enemy creeping and economic activity during which he himself was able to keep his economy free from attack. By doing so Madfrog took full advantage of the Undead race's superior speed, which allowed him to do damage to his opponent and retreat before the opponent could engage his forces. This has now become an integral aspect of undead gameplay.

He is famous for popularizing the use of gargoyles and consequently for inventing and popularizing the now common unit combination of ghouls and gargoyles, specifically versus the Night Elf race in solo matches. Before Madfrog, gargoyles were seldom used and were considered unfeasible as an air to ground combat creature. However, gargoyles, being flying creatures, provided impressive mobility to Madfrog's hit and run tactics. Due to the impressive speed and mobility of the attack force the enemy was forced to defend from imminent attack or engage Madfrog's main base. In head-on battle Madfrog combined gargoyles with ghouls to form the basis of his force versus nightelf. Both units complimented each other in a remarkable way and obliterated almost all contemporary night elf unit combinations. He came up with the nowadays often used Lich and ghouls and later massive gargoyles strategy in Undead mirror.

== StarCraft II career ==
In 2010, after StarCraft II: Wings of Liberty was released, Johansson frequently played on the European ladders and participated in a number of tournaments, including the Inferno Cup and played a show match against professional StarCraft II player, Dario "TLO" Wünsch from TeamLiquid, at the 2010 European Warcraft 3 Invitational. Afterwards, he stated that he wished to play StarCraft II competitively in the future. Not long afterwards, Johansson was invited to the Intel Extreme Masters Global Challenge 2010 (IEM) in Cologne, Germany putting him in direct competition with other professional players outside of Asia. Soon before the start of the tournament, Johansson signed a contract as a StarCraft II player for SK Gaming. However, his contract was renewed for 2011.

== Notable accomplishments ==
=== Individual ===
- EGG (Norway) (2004)
- Electronic Sports World Cup (2004)
- Blizzard Worldwide Invitational (2004)
- Kbk Jeju Tournament (2003)
- Electronic Sports World Cup 2003

=== Team ===
Sweden

- World Cyber Games's Nations StarCraft (2001)

SK Gaming

- Electronic Sports League's WC3L Season VIII (2005)

Sonokong/Frienz

- MBCGame's Clan Team Battle (2004)
- Ongamenet's SUMA pro-league (2004)
