= Sky (gamer) =

Chinese esports player

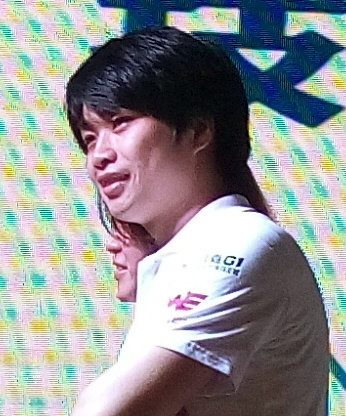
- SKY in 2014s ChinaJoy

Personal information
- Name: 李晓峰 (Li Xiaofeng)
- Born: 1984 or 1985 (age 40–41)
- Nationality: Chinese

Career information
- Games: Warcraft III series
- Playing career: 2004–2015

Team history
- 2005–2015: World Elite

Li Xiaofeng (Chinese: 李晓峰; pinyin: Li Xiaofeng), who also goes by the pseudonym "Sky" or "WE.Sky", is a Chinese former professional gamer of the popular Blizzard Entertainment real-time strategy game Warcraft III: The Frozen Throne. He played for the China-based World Elite team. He is considered one of the best Human players in the game's history by World Cyber Games. In the past few years he has been heavily involved with coaching Team WE's League of Legends team.

Li Xiaofeng is featured in the documentary film Beyond the Game, and as a cameo in drama series Gank Your Heart as himself.

== Game style ==
He is widely known for his aggressive playing style with the Human race, which many considered to be a “slow” defensive race. He is known for using a fast tech build with a lumber mill, which leads to a push using the Archmage, Beastmaster, militia, towers and numerous summoned creatures to overwhelm the opponent. In numerous Warcraft III forums this strategy has been coined “Sky Rush." He was also known for a "two farm tech" without a lumber mill which leads to the "Sky Push," involving riflemen, a few casters, a breaker, and Archmage/Naga against Night Elf, but as Night Elves learned to defeat this push, it lost popularity in favor of more tower-reliant strategies.

The landmark defeat came in World Cyber Games 2007 Grand Final Fourth day: War Craft match: SkY vs 4K-Creoloph_03. SKY was just about to win with his traditional rush and get his third WCG gold in a row (first time in history), but was unexpectedly defeated.

== Career ==
Li Xiaofeng started his career in 2004 and gained recognition in international competitive gaming after taking third place at the first edition of the World e-Sports Games during a three-month stay in Seoul, South-Korea in March, 2005. He would remain one of the most notable players throughout the remainder of the year, dominating his competitive home country and showing strong international results by winning ACON 5 and taking fourth place at the Electronic Sports World Cup 2005.

He surprised the world by taking first place at the World Cyber Games 2005 by the end of the season, the tournament was considered the toughest to win of all tournaments and had a player field that included names as Manuel "Grubby" Schenkhuizen and Dae "FoV" Hui Cho.

Going into 2006 as one of the most successful players of the previous season, he stood out by showing consistent performance with excellent micromanagement and maturity in strategy and thinking. He finished within the top 3 of many of the major tournaments of the year, but was widely expected to make his strongest appearance at the World Cyber Games again.

During the 2006 World Cyber Games he went undefeated through what was considered the toughest road to the grand finals for all attendees including an encounter with Manuel Schenkhuizen. Beating Yoan Merlo in the grand finals, Li Xiaofeng became the first back to back Warcraft III World Cyber Games champion. Earning him a spot in the World Cyber Games "Hall of Fame".

In 2007 he lost in the finals of the World Cyber Games, and had to settle for silver.

He was recognized as the greatest WarCraft III player of 2006 by competitive gaming media around the world.

In 2015, Li officially announced his retirement.

== Notable accomplishments ==
=== Individual ===
- WCG China (2004)
- ESWC Chinese Qualifiers (2005)
- World Cyber Games 2005
- ACON 5 (2005)
- World E-Sports Games I (2005)
- World Cyber Games 2006
- International Electronic Sports Tournament (2006)
- Starswar 2 (2006)
- Starswar 3 (2006)
- Lenovo IEST (2006)
- ProGamer League Season 1 (2006)
- Electronic Sports World Cup (2006)
- World e-Sports Games Masters (2006)
- International E-Sports Festival (2006)
- World Cyber Games 2007
- CEG Changchun Tour (2007)
- ProGamer League Season 2 (2007)
- Starswar 4 (2007)
- Race War Season III (2007)
- Dream Cup #10' (2007)
- Neo Star League Season 2 Finals (2008)
- PGL Season 3 (2008)
- Electronic Sports World Cup Masters of Paris 2008
- Dream Cup Season III finals (2008)
- Electronic Sports World Cup 2008
- ESL Continental Final Asia
- CEG Beijing Tour (2008)
- IEF (2008)
- World GameMaster Tournament (2008)
- CEG Chengdu Tour
- PGL Season 4 (2009)
- Extreme Masters 3 Continental Finals Asia (2009)
- International Electronic Sports Tournament 2009
- Zotac Cup #189 (2011)
- World Cyber Games 2011
- 'World Cyber Games 2012

=== Awards ===
- 2006 GGL Player of the year
- Member of World Cyber Games Hall of Fame
