= Grubby =

Dutch professional esports player (born 1986)

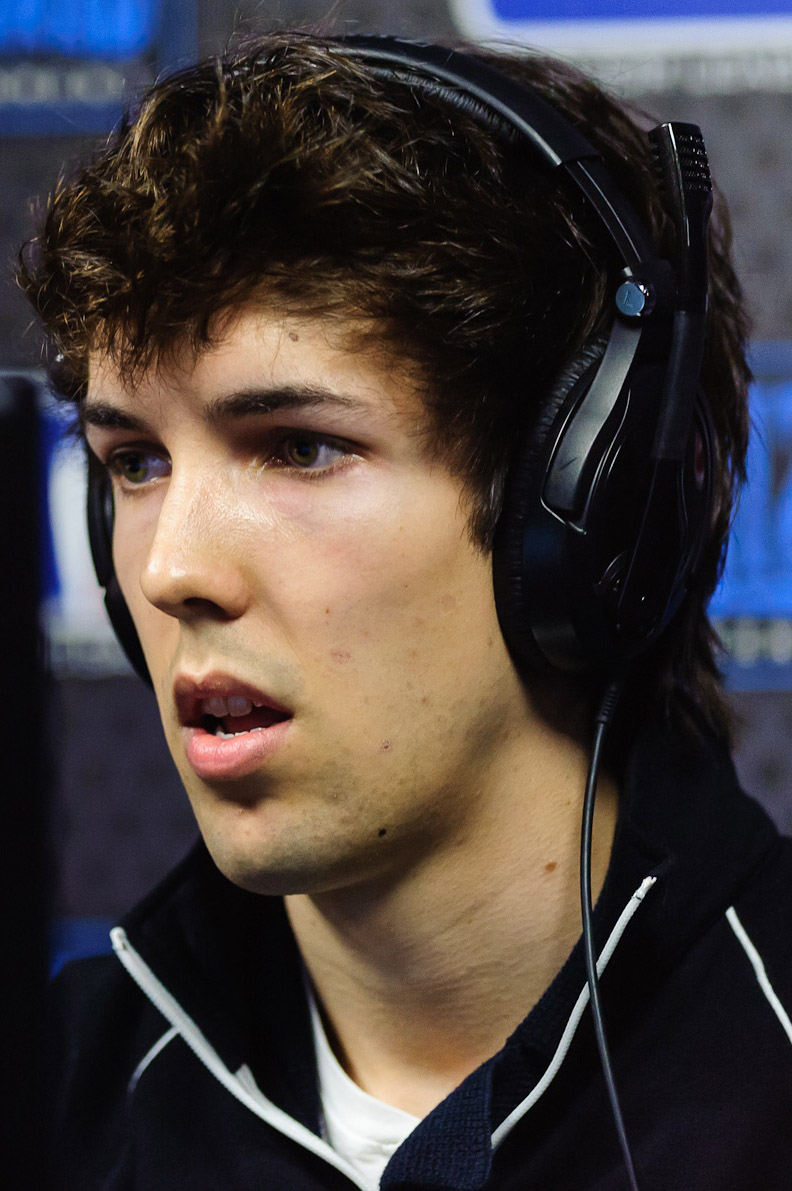
- Schenkhuizen at the MLG 2012 Summer Championship

Personal information
- Name: Manuel Schenkhuizen
- Nationality: Dutch

Career information
- Games: Warcraft III; StarCraft II; Age of Empires 4; Dota 2

Team history
- 2003–2008: 4Kings
- 2008–2009: MeetYourMakers
- 2009–2011: Evil Geniuses

Career highlights and awards
- 2× WCG champion (2004, 2008)

Manuel Schenkhuizen (Dutch: [ˈmaːnyʋɛl ˈsxɛŋkˌɦœyzə(n)]), better known as Grubby, is a Dutch internet personality and former professional esports player. He competed in the real-time strategy genre, predominantly playing Warcraft III (WC3), Warcraft III: The Frozen Throne and Starcraft II. Grubby is one of the most successful WC3 players of all time, as an Orc player, having won more than 38 LAN tournaments, of which six were World Championships. His command over the Horde placed him early enough among the elite of the WC3 players, while his clash with Jang "Spirit Moon" Jae-ho rewarded him with a legendary status among the fans of the game. Grubby is known for being part of some of the most successful WC3 teams in history, namely the British 4Kings. Later teams include the Danish MeetYourMakers and the North American Evil Geniuses. Grubby is widely regarded as one of the greatest Orc players of all time. Grubby is now a popular full-time streamer on Twitch.

== Esports career ==
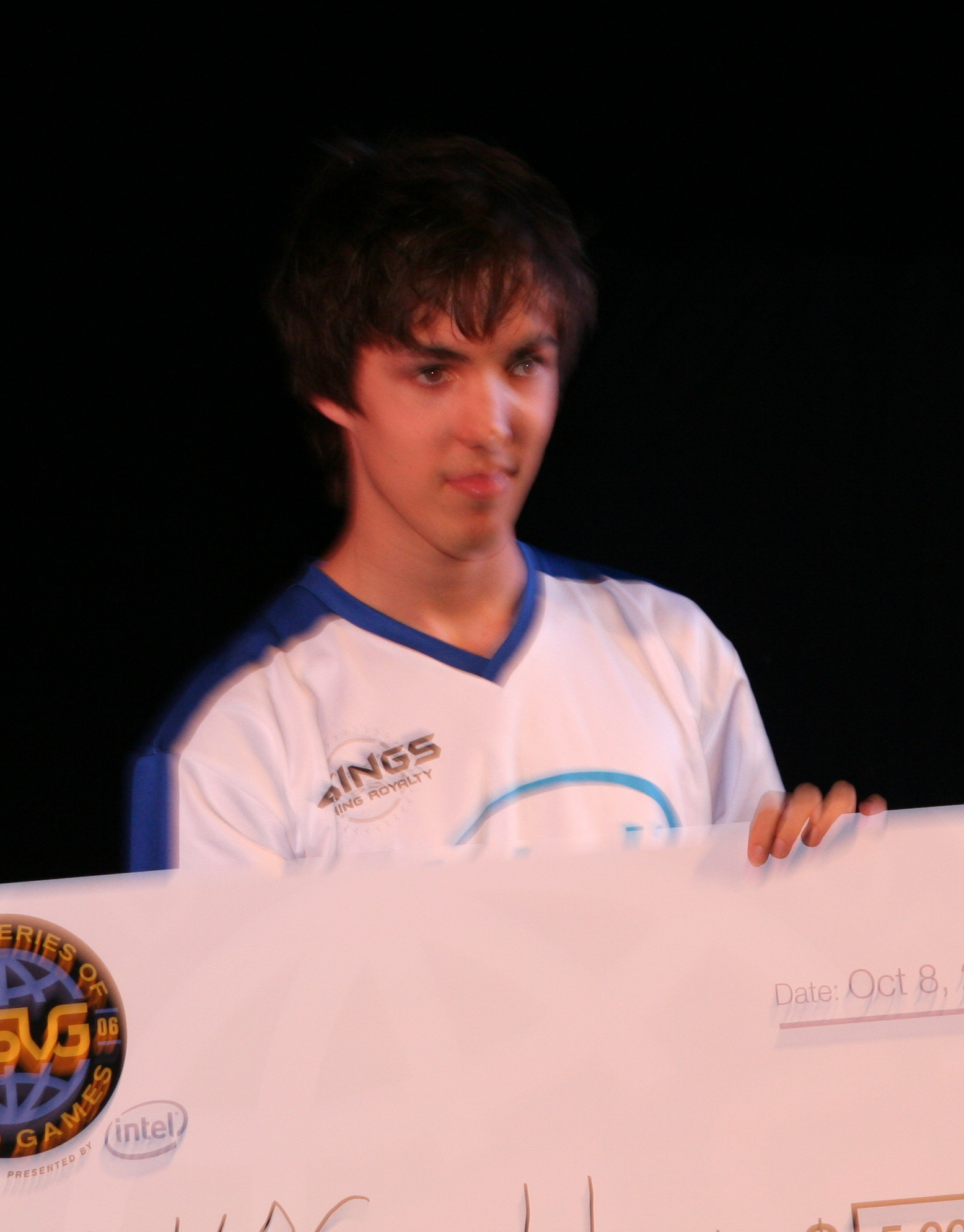
Grubby at the World Series of Video Games 2006: London

Grubby has been on three professional teams throughout his career. His stay in Four-Kings (4K) lasted from October 2003 until January 2008. From January 2008 until January 2009 he featured in MeetYourMakers (MYM). In the past, he has formed strong 2 versus 2 teams with Arvid "Myth" Fekken, Yoan "ToD" Merlo and Olav "Creolophus" Undheim. In 2008, 4K discontinued their Warcraft III team and all the players went their own way. After the disbanding of the team MeetYourMakers in January 2009, Grubby and his then teammate Jang Jae Ho parted ways. He then joined the team Evil Geniuses in April 2009 with his wife Cassandra "PpG" Ng. He left the team in April 2011 and continues to compete solo. His major tournament victories include the World Cyber Games in 2004, Electronic Sports World Cup 2005, the World Series of Video Games in 2006, the World Cyber Games 2008, World e-Sports Masters in 2009 and e-Stars 2009 – King of the Game, Seoul – South Korea

His accomplishments in the two World Cyber Games victories have led him to be included in the tournament's hall of fame. Schenkhuizen is the only WC3 player to have won both the WCG and the ESWC title. He's also one of the longest playing professional players of Warcraft III. Schenkhuizen is the protagonist in the documentary film Beyond the Game.

In 2011, Schenkhuizen moved from Warcraft III to StarCraft II as a Protoss player.

In 2015, he began casting esports events for Heroes of the Storm, including casting the world championships at Blizzcon 2015 and 2016.

== Personal life ==
Schenkhuizen was born in a family of Dutch Indo descent. He became engaged to Cassandra 'PpG' Ng at BlizzCon 2009 and the two married in 2010.

== Tournament results ==
Place	Event
1	Cyber X Games - 2004
1	World Cyber Games 2004
1	Electronic Sports World Cup 2005
1	World Series of Video Games 2006
1	World Cyber Games 2008
1	WCReplays Almojo $1000 Tournament
2	NGTV League Season 1 Aug – Oct 2008
1	AMD Black All Stars October 2008
2	2on2 Fit4Gaming December 2008
1	World e-Sports Masters 2009
1	e-Stars 2009 King of the Game
1	GOMtv World Invitational (GWI) June 2009

== Awards and nominations ==
Year	Ceremony	Category	Result	Ref.
2005	Esports Awards	Esports Team of the Year	Won	
2006	Esports Awards	Best Warcraft III Player	Won	
2006	Gosu Gamers Awards	Gamer of the Year	Won	
2008	Gosu Gamers Awards	Gamer of the Year	Won	
2024	The Streamer Awards	Best Strategy Game Streamer	Nominated	

=== ESL's WC3L awards ===
- Electronic Sports League WarCraft 3 League Season 5 Most Valuable Player
- Electronic Sports League WarCraft 3 League Season 7 Most Valuable Player
- Electronic Sports League WarCraft 3 League Season 8 Most Valuable Player
- Electronic Sports League WarCraft 3 League Season 9 Most Valuable Player
