= 2007 in esports =

In Major League Gaming, Team Final Boss beat Team Carbon to win the MLG Las Vegas 2007 National Championship.

Championship	1st place, gold medalist(s)	2nd place, silver medalist(s)	3rd place, bronze medalist(s)	4th
Halo 2 4v4	(United States) Team Final Boss	(United States) Team Carbon	(United States) Str8 Rippin	(United States) FBI The Agency
Halo 2 FFA	(United States) KGB Soviet	(United States) Cloud	(United States) Naded	(United States) Legit
Tom Clancy's Rainbow Six: Vegas 4v4	(United States) NeW eRa	(United States) Harmony N Havoc	(United States) Profe$$ional $kill$	(United States) RainbowSix Legends
Gears of War 4v4	(United States) Infinity	(United States) TH3 NSAN3Z	(United States) Vision	(United States) LGD Red
Shadowrun 4v4	(United States) Three Shot Killers	(United States) Shoot to Kill	(United States) Secret Weapon	(United States) UprisinG

In the Championship Gaming Series their series began in 2007, with the 2007 Championship Gaming Series season. At the time it was the most expensive esports tournament of all time.
