= Saiyan (gamer) =

American professional esports player

Personal information
- Name: Ryan Danford
- Born: October 20, 1985 (age 41); Cary, North Carolina, U.S.

Career information
- Games: Halo: Combat Evolved; Halo 2
- Playing career: 2004–2007

Team history
- 2004–2005: Shoot to Kill
- 2005–2006: Team 3D
- 2006: Final Boss

Ryan Danford (born October 20, 1985) is an American former professional Halo player known by the handle Saiyan. He was influential in the early days of professional video gaming or esports and played for the champion teams Shoot to Kill, Team 3D, and Final Boss: In 2006, Major League Gaming stated, "One of the true veterans of the league, Saiyan has been a force in Major League Gaming's upper echelon since its onset." Saiyan retired from professional gaming in 2007.

== Early life ==
Danford is from Cary, North Carolina. He attended West Cary Middle School where he made the A Honor Roll. He swam and played soccer during high school but a soccer accident his senior year, resulted in a bad break in his thumb. He also broke his thumb on another occasion. These injuries caused ongoing pain, requiring him to ice his hand before gaming.

After graduating from high school, Danford attended the University of North Carolina at Chapel Hill. However, he took a year off in 2006 to focus on video gaming. Danford noted, "It's hard to keep your grades up at a top university and play on a top team."

Danford's handle Saiyan comes from a temporary name he selected to match the yellow master chief he was using while playing locally—the Saiyans are beings from the manga Dragon Ball who can transform into a "Super Saiyan", which turns their hair yellow. He recalls, "Every game I played that day I was on fire." Around that time, he needed a handle to enter the Halo 50k1 and went with the name from his winning streak—Saiyan. Held in April 2003, Halo 50K1 was one of the first tournaments in video gaming; Danford came in 2nd place with the Danford/Moore 4 vs. 4 team.

== Career ==
=== Shoot to Kill ===
Danford began competing professionally in 2004 with Major League Gaming (MLG). That year, he played Halo: Combat Evolved with Team StK or Shoot to Kill. His teammates were Dave "Walshy" Walsh, Tom "OGRE2" Ryan, and Dan "OGRE1" Ryan. Danford was released from StK after it can in second place at the MLG 50K3 in Atlanta in July 2004. StK picked up Danford for the Halo 2 2005 season. In February 2005, Walshy said, "Basically, Ryan plays half as much as me, but he's still as good, which is embarrassing for me." StK competed in five major events om 2005, coming in first place for all five.

=== Business Decision and Chargers ===
After leaving StK in 2004, Danford joined Business Decision with NistiC, Sergio, StrangePurplle; they won their first tournament MLG Los Angeles in September 2004 and placed 3rd at the MLG New York City National Championships in October 2004.

In October 2004, he played with KillerN, Toxin, Tupac as the Chargers at MLG Boston, taking first place in Halo: Combat Evolved 4 vs. 4.

=== Team 3D ===
In April 2005, Team StK changed its name to Team 3D because of sponsorship by the esports organization Team 3D. Danford and Team 3D won five of their next six events. Team member OGRE2 noted, "Ryan (Saiyan) who sacrifices himself to go through the portal first and take a combo hit for the team gets no credit at all." They ended the season as the number one ranked Halo 2 team and won the national championship. Danford's cash winnings for the season were approximately $40,000. He also won Major League Gaming's 2005 Pro's Choice Award.

In December 2005, Danford discussed his recently expanded training regime: " I wake up. I ice my hand so they're not sore from playing so much. Then I play all day. And I do it again tomorrow. I just realized that in Halo 1 you could just play the game, have fun and be good at it – for me at least – but in Halo 2 it's all about the little things. So you just have to play it over and over to make sure you're on. Then all those little things come together; the more you play the more consistent you are, and I think that it helped me to be more consistent and play my best."

=== Final Boss ===
When the Team 3D corporation dropped the team in April 2006, they changed their name to Final Boss. In June 2006, Danford and Final Boss signed a three-year contract with Major League Gaming. The team's contract was for one million dollars to play exclusively for MLG, with Danford's cut being $250,000. At the time, this was one of the largest signings in the history of professional esports. In addition to tournament play, Danford played with Final Boss on seven episodes of the Boost Mobile Major League Gaming Pro Circuit television show on USA Network.

Danford was voted Best Support Player and Most Unpredictable Player at the 2006 MLG Halo Pro's Choice Awards. With the former, MLG stated, "While stats do not often reflect how important the support player is to the success of the team, many teams live or die based on the work of their support man. These players were chosen to reflect not only their tremendous skill but their selfless attitudes and team-first mentality. Saiyan's natural awareness and fantastic shooting ability helped him edge out Karma in the race for gold in this category." In addition, MLG said, "Saiyan came away with the gold medal [for Most Unpredictable Player] in the voting here, as he is known not only to support his teammates during combat but also to slip behind enemy lines and completely disrupt the game plans of his opponents."

Despite these successes, Danford became the fall guy in November 2006 when Final Boss had its first loss, coming in second place to the team Carbon at MLG Orlando. Not only was he out of favor with the gaming community, but his teammates expressed their disappointment with Danford's gaming performance and his overall commitment. At the time, a reporter noted, "While one player hardly deserves credit for the failure of an entire team, Danford's situation as a fallen superstar on a team rocketing towards fame and fortune has made him a unique target of criticism, with some of it deserved; it isn't hard to see his name at the bottom of the scoreboard in many of Final Boss' losing efforts against their new rival."

Danford admitted that his game was sub-par at the time, but he practiced and planned new strategies for the 2005 MLG national championships in New York City, saying, "I'm not taking any chances for this, since it's the biggest I've ever played in. I'm very confident going into tomorrow compared to how I've felt I'd play at the last few; I feel my hard work is going to pay off."

Final Boss came in second place at the championships, losing the $100,000 first-place prize—more than the team had made by winning almost every MLG event of 2006. The loss led some to ask, "Did Carbon truly become the best, or did Final Boss just become lazy in their lordship?" Danford believes it was a mix of both. He was dropped from Final Boss on December 6, 2006. He was replaced by StrongSide, a player previously dropped by Carbon.

=== Free agent ===
Danford filed for free agency after the end of the 2006 season, giving up his contract with MLG. In 2007, he formed the team Make It Rain (MiR) with Detach, BoO, and Neighbor (also known as Toxinsneighbor). They were the number eight seed going into the first event of the MLG season. Make It Rain competed in the Halo 2 4 vs. 4 at the MLG Charlotte in April 2007, but only achieved 21st place. This was a career low for Danford.

In June 2007, Danford played a new lineup with Detach, Burns, and Lunatic called the Rainmakers for the MLG Meadowlands Halo 2 4 vs. 4 competition. They lost to the 132nd seed Generation Four. Danford retired shortly after that game.

== Equipment ==
Danford preferred his controls inverted with the default buttons and sensitivity level five.

== Legacy and impact ==
Danford was a founding member of Final Boss, considered one of the best Halo teams of all time; its members hold the record for the longest consecutive event-winning streak, with eight straight tournament victories in 2005 and 2006. Playing with Final Boss and its predecessors StK and Team 3D, Danford never placed lower than second and won sixteen events between 2004 and 2006.

In 2021, a multi-generational panel of players associated with the Halo Championship Series (HCS) ranked Danford at number 24 of the Top 25 Halo Players, noting: "Before retiring in 2007, Ryan racked up 21 event wins with an incredible average placing of 2.9!" On Twitter, many fans said that he was not ranked high enough by HCS, suggesting that the short length of his career and his retirement before Halo 3 probably impacted his ranking.

== Awards ==
- Halo Pro's Choice Awards Best Support Player, Major League Gaming, 2006
- Halo Pro's Choice Awards Most Unpredictable Player, Major League Gaming, 2006

== Select tournaments ==
=== Halo: Combat Evolved ===
Date	Event	2 vs. 2	4 vs. 4	Team	Teammates	Ref
2/22/2004	MLG Philadelphia Halo Nationals	1st		Ogre1/Saiyan	OGRE1	
4/25/2004	AGP 4 Washington D.C. (Note: Associates of Gaming Professional)		1st	The Dream Team	Alex, Clockwork, Darkman	
6/20/2004	MLG Chicago	1st		Shoot to Kill	OGRE1	
6/20/2004	MLG Chicago		2nd	Shoot to Kill	OGRE1, OGRE2, StrangePurple	
7/25/2004	MLG Atlanta Halo 50K3		2nd	Shoot to Kill	Clockwork, OGRE1, OGRE2	
9/26/2004	MLG Los Angeles		1st	Business Decision	NistiC, Sergio, StrangePurple	
10/10/2004	MLG Boston		1st	The Chargers	KillerN, Toxin, Tupac	
7/31/2005	MLG Philadelphia		1st	Team 3D	OGRE1, OGRE2, Walshy	

=== Halo 2 ===
Date	Event	4 vs. 4	Team	Teammates	Ref
1/30/2005	MLG Washington D.C.	1st	Shoot To Kill	OGRE1, OGRE2, Walshy	
2/27/2005	MLG San Francisco	1st	Shoot To Kill	OGRE1, OGRE2, Walshy	
3/3/2005	AGP 7 Washington D.C. (Note: Associates of Gaming Professional)	1st	Shoot To Kill	OGRE1, OGRE2, Walshy	
3/14/2005	MLG Houston	1st	Shoot To Kill	OGRE1, OGRE2, Walshy	
4/24/2005	MLG Orlando	1st	Team 3D	OGRE1, OGRE2, Walshy	
6/26/2005	MLG St. Louis	1st	Team 3D	OGRE1, OGRE2, Walshy	
7/6/2005	CPL World Tour Championship	1st	Team 3D	OGRE1, OGRE2, Walshy	
7/31/2005	MLG Philadelphia	2nd	Team 3D	OGRE1, OGRE2, Walshy	
8/7/2005	VGL Season 1 New York (Note: Video Gamers League)	1st	Team 3D	OGRE1, OGRE2, Walshy	
8/27/2005	VGL Season 1 Nationals Orlando (Note: Video Gamers League)	1st	Team 3D	OGRE1, OGRE2, Walshy	
10/16/2005	MLG Los Angeles: Western Conference Championships	1st	Team 3D	OGRE1, OGRE2, Walshy	
11/27/2005	MLG Atlanta Halo 50K4: Eastern Conference Championships	1st	Team 3D	OGRE1, OGRE2, Walshy	
12/18/2005	MLG Chicago: Central Conference Championships	1st	Team 3D	OGRE1, OGRE2, Walshy	
2/26/2006	MLG New York City National Championships 2005	1st	Team 3D	OGRE1, OGRE2, Walshy	
4/23/2006	MLG New York City	1st	Final Boss	OGRE1, OGRE2, Walshy	
5/21/2006	MLG Dallas	1st	Final Boss	OGRE1, OGRE2, Walshy	
6/25/2006	MLG Anaheim	1st	Final Boss	OGRE1, OGRE2, Walshy	
7/23/2006	MLG Chicago	1st	Final Boss	OGRE1, OGRE2, Walshy	
8/27/2006	MLG Orlando	2nd	Final Boss	OGRE1, OGRE2, Walshy	
10/15/2006	MLG New York City Playoffs	2nd	Final Boss	OGRE1, OGRE2, Walshy	
11/19/2006	MLG Las Vegas: National Championships	2nd	Final Boss	OGRE1, OGRE2, Walshy	
