= Boost Mobile MLG Pro Circuit =

- 2007 season logo
- Genre: Sports, esports, video games
- Theme music composer: Breaking Benjamin
- Opening theme: "Blow Me Away"
- Country of origin: United States
- Original language: English
- No. of seasons: 2
- No. of episodes: 13

Production
- Producer: Red Brick Entertainment
- Production location: Several locations across the United States
- Running time: 1 hour
- Budget: $6 million USD

Original release
- Network: USA Network (2006 season); G4 (2007 season)
- Release: November 1, 2006 – December 21, 2007

Boost Mobile MLG Pro Circuit
- League: Major League Gaming
- Sport: Halo 2
- Duration: March–December
- Games: Seven tournaments
- TV partner: USA Network

2006
- Season champions: Carbon (ShocKWav3, Gandhi, GH057ayame, Karma)
- Runners-up: Final Boss (Walshy, Ogre 1, Ogre 2, Saiyan)

New York

Las Vegas

Boost Mobile MLG Pro Circuit is a television program on US cable television network USA, and later G4, airing recordings of the Major League Gaming (MLG) Halo 2 Pro Circuit in 2006 and 2007. It was sponsored by Boost Mobile and Scion. Boost subscribers had access to exclusive videos such as match highlights and player profiles. The production company was Red Brick Entertainment.

There were seven one-hour long episodes that aired starting 10:00 AM EST throughout the holiday season. Team Carbon, Team Final Boss, and Str8 Rippin were shown on every episode. The Pro Circuit location were New York City (Apr 21–23); Dallas (May); Atlanta (June); Los Angeles (July); Philadelphia (August); Playoffs - Chicago (October); and the National Championship in Las Vegas (November). Over US$800,000 in prize money was given out during the course of the program.

At the Las Vegas championships Carbon, consisting of ShocKWav3, Gandhi, GH057ayame, Karma, upset Team Final Boss, Walshy, Ogre 1, Ogre 2, Saiyan, to the 2006 national title.

It was announced that the program would be moving to G4 for the 2007 season and would also switch to a Friday night 11:00 PM EST timeslot. In February it was announced that MLG that had partnered with Flame Ventures, a media development and production company, and Endeavor Talent Agency. Video game retailer GameStop also signed on as a sponsor. MLG Pro Circuit season two debuted on November 16 and aired for six episodes.

The MLG Las Vegas 2007 National Championships, which aired on December 21, were won by Final Boss, Walshy, Ogre 1, Ogre 2, and StrongSide, in a rematch over Carbon, ShocKWav3, Gandhi, Karma, and GH057ayame.

G4 decided not to pick up the show for a third season. Over the two seasons MLG spent over US$6 million on the show.

== See also ==
- ELeague
- Championship Gaming Series
- Ongamenet
