= Ogre 2 =

American esports player

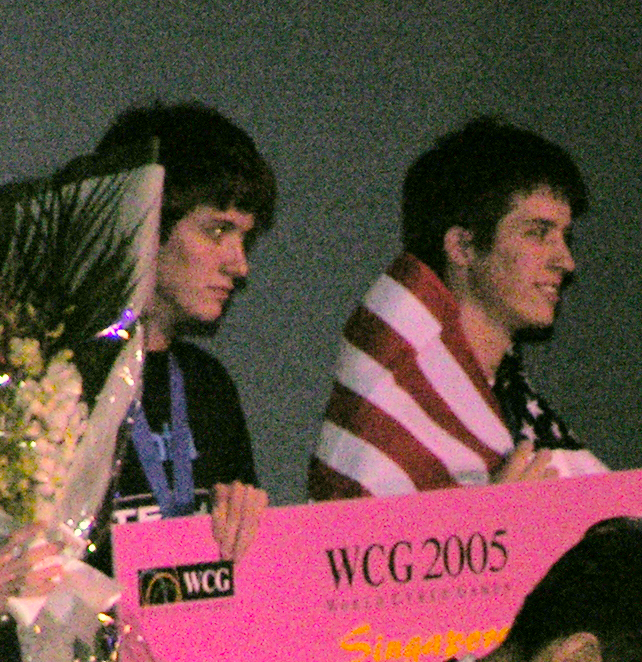
- The Ogre Twins at WCG 2005

Personal information
- Name: Tom Ryan
- Nickname: MH Ogre2, FB OG2, The 2gre
- Born: August 3, 1986 (age 40)
- Nationality: American

Current team
- Team: Miami Heretics
- Role: Manager
- Game(s): Halo, Call of Duty

Career information
- Games: Halo; Call of Duty; Shadowrun
- Playing career: Until 2016
- Coaching career: 2017–present

Team history

As player:
- 2003–2004: Shoot to Kill
- 2004–2004: Domination
- 2005: Shoot to Kill
- 2005–2006: Team 3D
- 2006–2011: Final Boss
- 2011–2012: Instinct
- 2014: Shoot to Kill
- 2014–2016: Counter Logic Gaming
- 2016: Team EnVyUs
- 2016: Denial eSports

As coach:
- 2017: Evil Geniuses
- 2017–2019: Team Reciprocity
- 2023–present: Miami Heretics (MH)

Tom Ryan (born August 3, 1986), better known as Ogre 2, is an American former professional Halo player and the current manager of the Miami Heretics (MH) esports team. Originally from Columbus, Ohio, Ogre 2 is widely considered to be the greatest Halo player of all time. He and his twin brother Dan ("Ogre 1") are known as the "Ogre Twins". In 2005, the Ogre Twins won the gold medal in Halo 2 at the World Cyber Games. His esports tournament history includes in Halo: Combat Evolved, Halo 2, Shadowrun, Halo 3, Halo: Reach, Halo 4, Halo 5: Guardians, Halo 2: Anniversary, and Call of Duty: Ghosts.

The Ogre Twins are a highly accomplished pair, winning many national Halo: Combat Evolved and Halo 2 tournaments. Ryan has played for many professional teams, including Instinct, Shoot to Kill, Team Domination, DtO, Final Boss, and Team3D. In June 2006, he signed a three-year contract with Major League Gaming. He played on the Boost Mobile MLG Pro Circuit on USA Network in 2006, and was briefly sponsored by NBA player Gilbert Arenas. He was also sponsored by Red Bull, Stride gum, and Eon. Ryan was a member of Counter Logic Gaming from 2014 to 2016.

== Gaming career ==
=== Halo Combat Evolved ===
Ryan began his professional gaming career at small local tournaments along with Dan Ryan, his twin brother. Ogre2's 4 vs. 4 teams in Halo Combat Evolved (Halo CE) finished first on multiple occasions and were regarded among the best teams. However, for 2 vs. 2 players, Ogre2's teammate was mostly his twin brother; they became one of the best duos in the history of Halo. They were so unstoppable that the level "Chill Out" was nicknamed Ogre City. They won many events together and quickly stamped their names as the best players in Halo.

Since then, Ryan has been a member of Halo: Combat Evolved and Halo 2 teams, some of which have garnered media and gamer attention for their impressive showings. These teams include Team 3D's Halo 2 team, Team StK (Shoot to Kill), Team Domination, Final Boss, Team Instinct, a revived StK, and CLG. Tom and his brother also represented the United States in the Halo 2 competition at the 2005 World Cyber Games in Singapore, defeating team Canada to secure a first-place finish.

=== Halo 2 ===
They won countless Halo 2 tournaments after the transition to the new game, which also saw them add another dominant Halo CE player, Saiyan, and team Domination was born. The team was considered unbeatable and although they lost a few events, they never fell below second place. They changed their names to Final Boss. As the key member of Final Boss, Ogre2 lead his team to win the first Halo 2 Nationals and two consecutive Major League Gaming National Championships in 2004 and 2005.

It wasn't until the emergence of Team Carbon that Final Boss struggled to continue its reign of dominance. Carbon and Final Boss would soon develop what was the biggest rivalry in Halo. At the 2006 Nationals, they placed second to Team Carbon in a 4–6 match. The OGRE Twins and their team Final Boss dominated MLG tournament play in both Halo CE and Halo 2, finishing in the top two in 38 consecutive tournaments (winning thirty of these), including ten tournament wins in a row between 2004 and 2005 and nine tournament wins in a row between 2005 and 2006. They also have an older brother Marty, OGRE3, who served as a coach for Final Boss at several tournaments.

For the last season of Halo 2 in 2007, the team made a change. They dropped Saiyan and picked up Strongside from Carbon. The result was a loss-free tournament. In the 2007 Nationals, Final Boss took first place and received a $100,000 check. This was one of the biggest winnings in competitive gaming history at the time. Ogre2 and Ogre 1 had some of the highest winnings among players as well.

=== Halo 3 ===
As the 2008 Halo 3 season started, Final Boss won at MLG Meadowlands by defeating Team Classic. In a surprising move, after placing dismally at the next two events, Final Boss dropped longtime captain Walshy to pick up another high-profile player from Str8 Rippin, Neighbor. Walshy would go on to join Team Instinct for the remainder of the 2008 Season. Going into 2009, Strongside departed for the newly formed Status Quo and Ryan's brother left Final Boss and moved to Australia. This left Ogre2 as the only remaining original member of Final Boss, alongside pro players Mackeo, Fearitself, and Victory X. The next season brought a variety of new additions, including Mackeo, Fearitself, and Victory X, along with Neighbor, Sypher, and Totz. After a disappointing eight-place finish at the end of the 2009 season with a roster of Ryan, FearItSelf, Totz, and Victory X, the team improved to a third-place finish to team Instinct.

Final Boss dropped Totz to pick up Justin "iGotUrPistola" Deese, part of the Triggers Down squad that had dominated the 2009 MLG circuit. Final Boss improved, finishing second behind Instinct and then going on to win the next tournament. With this win, Ogre2 passed his brother and became the winningest player in MLG history. Final Boss continued to dominate Halo 3 in 2010, winning three tournaments, including the national championship.

=== Halo Reach ===
In 2011, Halo: Reach made its debut on the pro circuit at MLG Dallas. Final Boss came in as the highest-seeded team but lackluster results left Ryan with a tenth-place finish. This was his career low. After this event, Ogre2 and his teammate Pistola decided to leave Final Boss and join up with another set of gaming twins, Roy and Lunchbox, under coach Towey of Team Instinct. There was discussion if the Final Boss team name would be returned to Ogre and possibly change Victory X/FearitsSelf's team name to The Agency, a team Victory played on in Halo 2, but it never came to be.

After this merger, many dubbed this team as the God Squad because all five members are considered to be among the very best in the game. Each player had won a Halo 3 national title in the prior two years, with Roy and Pistola fighting for Best Player by taking MVP after MVP. During online scrimmages, teams quickly realized the squad was almost impossible to beat, and the nickname God Squad stuck.

In their first event, MLG Columbus 2011, Team Instinct only dropped one game out of 22 on their way to winning the event. They went undefeated at Anaheim, taking their win-loss record to 43–1. As they continued to win, teams around the league tried to create their own super teams to try to take down Instinct. Everyone was shocked when the newly formed Infamous team, ranked thirteenth, beat Instinct in the finals. Following this event, Orlando showed the same lack of show of their earlier success. After being upset by Status Quo in the loser bracket, Instinct took fifth, their worst placing as the God Squad. The team practiced for the nationals and they came back to win the national title at MLG Providence. This gave Ogre, as a five-time national champion, the unique distinction of becoming the only player to become national champion of every game in the Halo series.

In 2012, Ogre2 and his team Instinct continued to compete in Halo: Reach. They placed second at the MLG Event in Columbus, Ohio, losing to team Status Quo. From there, Ryan and his team competed in several smaller-scale events, taking first at an Arena League Gaming event. Several months later, Halo 4 was released and Instinct once again competed in Dallas, Texas for a pre-release MLG tournament. Some players illegally obtained the game early, however, and members of Instinct didn't think of it as a real event.

=== Call of Duty ===
In 2013, the competitive Halo scene was all but finished due to the dwindling popularity of the series and MLG pulling the franchise from their line-up. Ogre2 made the transition to competing in the rival game Call of Duty: Black Ops II. Ogre2's new team, Rage, consisted of all eSports veterans who had been successful at other competitive games.

In 2014, Ogre2 revived the Final Boss team name and moved on to Call of Duty: Ghosts, playing at multiple events with other former Halo pros. In March 2014, Ogre2 announced his retirement from competitive gaming, citing a lack of enjoyment as the primary reason. He ended his career with over 100 tournaments attended, including winning five out of the eight MLG National Championships (across four different titles).

=== Return of Halo ===
After nearly three years away from esports, Halo made a return to the Competitive Gaming scene after the announcement of Halo: The Master Chief Collection and Halo 2: Anniversary. Ryan brought back the name StK and competed at the developer-run Launch Invitational, finishing in third place. After the success of this tournament, the Halo Championship Series (HCS) was announced, again endorsed by developer 343 Industries and hosted by Electronic Sports League.

OGRE2 and his teammates were picked up by League of Legends organization Counter Logic Gaming (CLG), who were making their first splash into competitive Halo. The first HCS event was in Columbus, hosted by Iron Gaming. Once again OGRE2 took home a first-place finish, with a hard-fought win over Evil Geniuses. This was Ryan's sixth first-place gaming title and his 40th national/global level tournament win. After holding onto the number one seed for the majority of the season, a second-place finish to Evil Geniuses at Gamers 4 Giving pushed them back for the first time since the season started. Evil Geniuses continued their dominance and took PAX nationals away from CLG in the finals, leaving CLG to take home 20K.

At the start of Season 2, CLG disagreed with teammate Heinz. Heinz was traded to Denial for Cloud. CLG seemed to have a more slayer-oriented team, placing in the top four in the first two preseason online cups. However, their weaknesses showed when CLG took a disappointing fifth place at the first LAN event of the new season. The team struggled after this by taking 5th/6th in the next online cup. Soon after, Ogre2 left for Hawaii to attend his brother's wedding, which overall showed on the CLG team. As a replacement CLG snagged Clutch, which didn't work out in CLG's favor. They placed poorly in most of the cups and moved down in the HCS standings as a result.

When Ogre2 returned, CLG had their worst placing in the 4th online cup but soon changed by taking 3rd in the next two cups. When going into HCS Indy, CLG was a fifth-place seed. Wins in the first couple of rounds would pair them against a more aggressive Cloud 9 and an unstoppable Evil Geniuses who were almost unbeatable during Season 2. After being beaten by Cloud 9, CLG fought through the loser bracket only to take second just behind EG. Much like in season 1, CLG was beaten by EG in the winner's bracket and fought through the loser's bracket to meet back up with EG back in the finals. It appeared that CLG could take the championship after winning the first series, but EG came clawing back to beat CLG 3-0 in the second series. Despite CLG placing second, they became one of the top two best teams to have played in H2A.

=== Halo 5 ===
After MLG announced they wanted to take the reins of Halo 5 in 2015, people quickly became interested in the new game's potential. The prize pool jumped to a million dollars and is now residing somewhere on the plus side of two million dollars. CLG was one of the few teams to stay together after the offseason of H2A. After a short time, Cloud was dropped from the team and replaced by Frosty. Royal and Frosty took the main slayer roles and Snakebite could then be moved to objective/support, which seemed to suit him better. Ogre continued to play the support role and CLG appeared to be one of the better teams.

Going into the online qualifiers, CLG faced a higher seed. They played EG early in the bracket and finished 5th-8th. Upset with their placing, they came out hot, taking 3rd-4th, losing to the winning team Allegiance. However, they beat Allegiance in the following tournament. The next tournament seemed to have an effect on the other players of CLG after another 3rd-4th finish. This placing lead to Ogre2 removal from his team for the first time ever on January 24. Ryan joined Mikwen, former teammate Pistola, and Arkanum on the team EnVyUs. Due to a last minute team change, EnVyUs was unable to play for Xgames. Ogre2 had to sit out and watch CLG make it to the finals.

Going into the next season which was picked up by ESL, Ogre2 was struggling to find a team. He tried out with Ninja and the Renegades squad without success. As the Summer Pro League started to come closer, Ogre teamed with Seduce, Arkanum, and Nemassist on team Denial. Denial took second place in the Invitation online qualifier. This gave Denial an automatic invitation to the Summer Qualifier. However, Denial failed to qualify for the last chance qualifier. After another unsatisfying result, Ryan decided to take a break from Halo and find other spots in the Esports world. He announced his retirement from professional gaming on May 21, 2016.

=== Coach and manager ===
Ryan became a coach for the Evil Geniuses organization following the previous coach, Towey's, transition to Call of Duty. He remained a coach until EG disbanded their Halo roster.

On August 26 Ogre2 joined the Florida Mutineers Call of Duty team as general manager. The team was rebranded under Misfits Gaming as the Miami Heretics (MH).

== Awards ==
- Best Overall Player – 2005 MLG Pros' Choice Awards
- Best Overall Player – 2006 MLG Pros' Choice Awards
- Best Overall Player – 2007 MLG Pros' Choice Awards
- Best Strategist – 2010 MLG Pros' Choice Awards
- Best Leader – 2011 MLG Pros' Choice Awards
- Boost Mobile Season MVP – 2007 MLG
- Most Valuable Player – MLG Charlotte 2007
- Most Valuable Player – MLG Meadowlands 2008
- Matador Bold Player – MLG D.C. 2010

== Select tournaments ==
=== Halo: Combat Evolved ===
Date	Event	Free for All	2v2	3v3	4v4	Team	Teammates	Ref
4/27/2003	Halo 50K		1st			Shoot to Kill	OGRE1	
6/1/2003	iGames Nationals 2v2		1st			Ogres	OGRE1	
8/3/2003	Halo 50K2 Atlanta	1st			1st	Shoot to Kill	Cyrax, OGRE1, Strangepurple	
8/3/2003	Halo 50K2 Atlanta		1st			Shoot to Kill	OGRE1	
11/30/2003	AGP 3 Nashville				1st	Shoot to Kill	Clockwork, OGRE1, Strangepurple	
2/22/2004	MLG Philadelphia Halo Nationals	2nd			1st	Shoot to Kill	OGRE1, Strangepurple, Clockwork	
4/18/2004	MLG Dallas		1st				Strangepurple	
4/18/2004	MLG Dallas			1st		Shoot to Kill	OGRE1, Clockwork	
6/20/2004	MLG Chicago: Midwest Mayham		2nd			Shoot to Kill 2	Strangepurple	
6/20/2004	MLG Chicago: Midwest Mayhem	2nd			2nd	Shoot to Kill	OGRE1, Saiyan, Strangepurple	
725/2004	MLG Atlanta Halo 50K3				2nd	Shoot to Kill	Clockwork, OGRE2, Saiyan	
7/25/2005	MLG Atlanta Halo 50K3		1st			Shoot to Kill	OGRE1	
8/3/2004	Halo 50K2		1st			Shoort to Kill	OGRE1	
8/3/2004	Halo 50K2	1st			1st	Shoot to Kill	Cyrax, OGRE1, Strangepurple	
8/22/2004	MLG Seattle	2nd			1st	Domination	KillerN, OGRE1, Walshy	
8/29/2004	AGP 5 Nashville		2nd			Domination	Walshy	
8/29/2004	AGP 5 Nashville	3rd-4th			1st	Domination	KillerN, OGRE1, Walshy	
9/24/2004	AGP 6 Chicago	3rd-4th			1st	Domination	KillerN, OGRE1, Walshy	
10/26/2004	MLG New York City National Championships	2nd			1st	Domination	KillerN, OGRE1, Walshy	
7/31/2005	MLG Philadelphia				1st	Team 3D	OGRE1, Saiyan, Walshy	

=== Halo 2 ===
Date	Event	Free for All	2v2	4v4	Team	Teammates	Ref
1/30/2005	MLG Washington D.C.	1st		1st	Shoot To Kill	OGRE1, Saiyan, Walshy	
2/27/2005	MLG San Francisco			1st	Shoot To Kill	OGRE1, Saiyan, Walshy	
3/3/2005	AGP 7			1st	Shoot To Kill	OGRE1, Saiyan, Walshy	
3/14/2005	MLG Houston			1st	Shoot To Kill	OGRE1, Saiyan, Walshy	
4/24/2005	MLG Orlando			1st	Team 3D	OGRE1, Saiyan, Walshy	
6/26/2005	MLG St. Louis			1st	Team 3D	OGRE1, Saiyan, Walshy	
7/10/2005	CPL World Tour Championship			1st	Team 3D	OGRE1, Saiyan, Walshy	
7/31/2005	MLG Philadelphia			2nd	Team 3D	OGRE1, Saiyan, Walshy	
8/7/2005	VGL New York			1st	Team 3D	OGRE1, Saiyan, Walshy	
8/27/2005	VGL Orlando Nationals	2nd		1st	Team 3D	OGRE1, Saiyan, Walshy	
9/10/2005	World Cyber Games USA Qualifier, New York City		1st		Team 3D1	OGRE1	
10/16/2005	MLG Los Angeles: Western Conference Championships	2nd		1st	Team 3D	OGRE1, Saiyan, Walshy	
11/20/2005	World Cyber Games 2005, Suntec City, Singapore		1st		Team 3D	OGRE1	
11/27/2005	MLG Atlanta Halo 50K4: Eastern Conference Championships	1st		1st	Team 3D	OGRE1, Saiyan, Walshy	
12/18/2005	MLG Chicago: Central Conference Championships			1st	Team 3D	OGRE1, Saiyan, Walshy	
2/26/2006	MLG New York City National Championships 2005			1st	Team 3D	OGRE1, Saiyan, Walshy	
4/23/2006	MLG New York City			1st	Final Boss	OGRE1, Saiyan, Walshy	
5/21/2006	MLG Dallas	3rd		1st	Final Boss	OGRE1, Saiyan, Walshy	
6/25/2006	MLG Anaheim			1st	Final Boss	OGRE1, Saiyan, Walshy	
7/23/2006	MLG Chicago			1st	Final Boss	OGRE1, Saiyan, Walshy	
8/27/2006	MLG Orlando			2nd	Final Boss	OGRE1, Saiyan, Walshy	
10/15/2006	MLG New York City Playoffs			2nd	Final Boss	OGRE1, Saiyan, Walshy	
11/19/2006	MLG Las Vegas: National Championships			2nd	Final Boss	OGRE1, Saiyan, Walshy	
4/15/2007	MLG Charlotte			1st	Final Boss	OGRE1, StrongSide, Walshy	
6/10/2007	MLG Meadowlands	3rd		1st	Final Boss	OGRE1, StrongSide, Walshy	
7/22/2007	MLG Dallas			2nd	Final Boss	OGRE1, StrongSide, Walshy	
8/19/2007	MLG Chicago			1st	Final Boss	OGRE1, StrongSide, Walshy	
9/23/2007	MLG Orlando			2nd	Final Boss	OGRE1, StrongSide, Walshy	
10/14/2007	MLG Las Vegas National Championship			1st	Final Boss	OGRE1, StrongSide, Walshy	
11/5/2007	MLG Canadian Open			1st	Final Boss	OGRE1, StrongSide, Walshy	

=== Shadowrun ===
Date	Event	4v4	Team	Ref
2007	MLG Las Vegas	2nd	Shoot to Kill	
2007	MLG Orlando	1st	Shoot to Kill	
2007	MLG Chicago	1st	Shoot to Kill	

=== Halo 3 ===
Date	Event	4v4	Team	Teammates	Ref
4/13/2008	MLG Meadowlands	1st	Final Boss	OGRE1, StrongSide, Walshy	
6/6/2010	MLG Columbus	2nd	Final Boss	FearItSelf, iGotUrPistola, Victory X	
8/29/2010	MLG Raleigh	1st	Final Boss	FearItSelf, iGotUrPistola, Victory X	
10/17/2010	MLG Washington, D.C.	1st	Final Boss	FearItSelf, iGotUrPistola, Victory X	
11/7/2010	MLG Dallas National Championship	1st	Final Boss	FearItSelf, iGotUrPistola, Victory X	

=== Halo: Reach ===
Date	Event	4v4	Team	Ref
2011	MLG Columbus	1st	Instinct	
2011	MLG Anaheim	1st	Instinct	
2011	MLG Raleigh	2nd	Instinct	
2011	MLG Providence National Championship	1st	Instinct	
2012	MLG Columbus	2nd	Instinct	
2012	MLG Columbus	1st	Instinct	

=== Halo 2: Anniversary ===
Date	Event	4v4	Team	Ref
2014	HCS Pre-Season Cup #2	1st	Counter Logic Gaming	
2014	HCS: Iron Gaming Columbus	1st	Counter Logic Gaming	
2014	HCS: UGC St. Louis	2nd	Counter Logic Gaming	
2014	HCS Season Cup #3	1st	Counter Logic Gaming	
2015	HCS: G4G 2015	2nd	Counter Logic Gaming	
2015	HCS: Season 1 Finals	2nd	Counter Logic Gaming	
2015	HCS Pre-Season Cup #2	2nd	Counter Logic Gaming	
2015	HCS: PGL Indianapolis	2nd	Counter Logic Gaming	
2015	HCS: Season 2 Finals	2nd	Counter Logic Gaming	

=== Halo 5 ===
Date	Event	4v4	Team	Ref
2016	HWC Online Cup #3	1st	Counter Logic Gaming	
