= Matt Leto =

American professional esports player

Zyos

Personal information
- Name: Matt Leto
- Born: 1983 or 1984 (age 42–43)
- Nationality: American

Career information
- Games: Halo: Combat Evolved; Halo 2; Project Gotham Racing 3
- Playing career: 2003–2006

Team history
- 2003: Dream Team
- 2004: Team FFA
- 2005: Str8 Rippin
- 2005: Trademark Gamers
- 2006: XiT Woundz

Matt Leto, known by the gamer tag Zyos, is an American former professional player of the first-person shooter video games Halo: Combat Evolved and Halo 2. Zyos spent a year in his late teens accumulating video game records, and for a while was the holder of the most records. After dropping out of DigiPen Institute of Technology, Leto pursued a career in professional gaming.

Leto won the 2003 and 2004 World Cyber Games, and was signed to become a professional game player that same year. He remained champion until he was defeated in 2005, and was known for his quiet, patient style of play, and his skill in one-on-one matches. In 2006 he retired from professional gaming. He is currently working as a real estate agent in Texas.

== Early life and career ==
Leto played his first video game at the age of five, playing Super Mario Bros. In his early teens he played and won local video game competitions. At the age of 17, he broke the world record for points scored in the video game Crazy Taxi, and when Twin Galaxies, which records video game records, wanted more proof, he recorded a video of beating his own record. He then spent the next year focused on breaking video game records and eventually broke 742 of them. He had the highest number of records ever achieved until Tom Duncan surpassed him. Originally Zyos was interested in going to DigiPen Institute of Technology to learn how to create video games, but found it intense and that it was not his passion. Having dropped out of college, he later left his job at an ice cream shop at age 19 and began pursuing a career in professional gaming. In late 2002 Leto competed at AGP1, his first video game tournament, and though his team placed fifth, he ranked second individually out of three hundred players.

== Professional career ==
=== 2003 ===
In the fall of 2003, Leto was recruited to play professionally for Major League Gaming (MLG) at the age of 19. That year, he was part of the four-man team "Dream Team". He won the top prize at the World Cyber Games 2003 held in Seoul, South Korea, winning $20,000. It was at that point that Zyos decided he could play video games as his career. That year, Zyos earned $30,000 from professional gaming. He also signed an endorsement deal with ActiVision that placed an endorsing quote on an Xbox shooter game titled Greg Hasting's Tournament Paintball.

=== 2004 ===
In 2004, GameSpot described Leto as the "number one Halo player in the United States". Leto came in second at the 2004 Dallas Midwestern Regional Tournament in the "Halo Free For All" category, and first in the N-Gage Competition playing Tony Hawk. As part of Team FFA competing in Major League Gaming tournaments, he helped defeat Shoot to Kill in an upset victory in Chicago, and then also Atlanta. Later in the MLG tournament series he was part of the Florida Jackalopes and were defeated in New York by Team Domination. At the MLG San Francisco tournament, Zyos agreed to split the prize money with his final competitor "Mighty" before the final game, and claimed to do so in order to make his opponent less hungry for victory.

Leto participated in the World Cyber Games 2004 in San Francisco. In preparation for the World Cyber Games, Zyos traveled for the two weeks prior to practice playing against his competitors. At the opening ceremony of the games, Leto was player representative, having been the previous year's champion, and called on players to have good sportsmanship. In the final game, Leto led early 13–5, but his opponent rallied to 13–10 before Zyos was able to also rally and defeat him. Zyos thus won the gold medal for the second year in a row, defeating Canadian Nelson Triana 2–0 in the "best out of three" format. He said that his second victory was more important than his first since he is now the third person to win two years in a row.

=== 2005 ===
At the Game Riot Conference in 2005, amateur players had a chance to play against Zyos to win prizes; Leto viewed the touring gaming exposition as a chance to build his reputation. In 2005, Zyos was paid for endorsements and had a managing team. He also came in third at the Major League Games Competition as part of the team Str8 Rippin. That team went on to defeat rivals "Team3D" in Philadelphia. Later that summer, he joined Team "Trademark Gamers", and later the "IGS Monglers". On September 13, 2005, Zyos was defeated by the Ogre twins in the third game of the World Cyber Games' United States Finals. Leto attributed his loss to his weakness in two-on-two play and stated his desire to continue playing one on one. In October 2005, Zyos competed and won the DigitalLife Tournament Series Halo 2 tournament, defeating "PdgfProxa" in the final match.

=== 2006 ===
Leto competed professionally in Halo 2 and Project Gotham Racing 3 at the World Series of Video Games in July 2006 at the Gaylord Texan Resort & Convention Center. He was also invited to attend the Championship Gaming Series that year. Following his defeat, he considered playing another first-person shooter or a future Halo game. In September of that year he visited the Cyber World Games and attendees had the opportunity to be taught how to play Halo 2. He was a part of team XiT Woundz, thought to be one of the top four Major League Gaming teams in 2006. The team was defeated by teams "eX" and MoBDeep, and ultimately placed seventh. Following the defeats, Zyos exited his hotel where he was staying for the tournament and has not returned to professional gaming. His retirement was called the ninth most important event in professional gaming that year by Major League Gaming.

== Technique ==
Zyos studied his opponent's style of play in order to find weaknesses. He also practiced four to five hours to day, and the week before a tournament for ten. He stated that most of the stress of competing is mental, though physical fitness helps in tournaments that can last 16 hours per day. Talents he has suggested players need include quick reflexes, concentration, and the ability to play under pressure. The transition from Halo to Halo 2 was a mixed bag for Zyos, since he called it an "easier game", but tournaments started being more focused on two-on-two. Once Halo 2 was released, Leto began to focus almost exclusively on it and did not play the original at all.

While on Team Str8 Rippin in 2005, Leto stated that their style was unique, since any team member might take on any role in their attack formation. They were also patient, content to wait for their enemies out and force the opposing team to attack when Str8 Rippin is ahead. Zyos insisted upon his teammates being silent and not trash-talking during matches in order to maintain focus.

== Tournament results ==
- 1st - 2003 World Cyber Games
- 1st - 2004 World Cyber Games
