= Ogre 1 =

American esports player

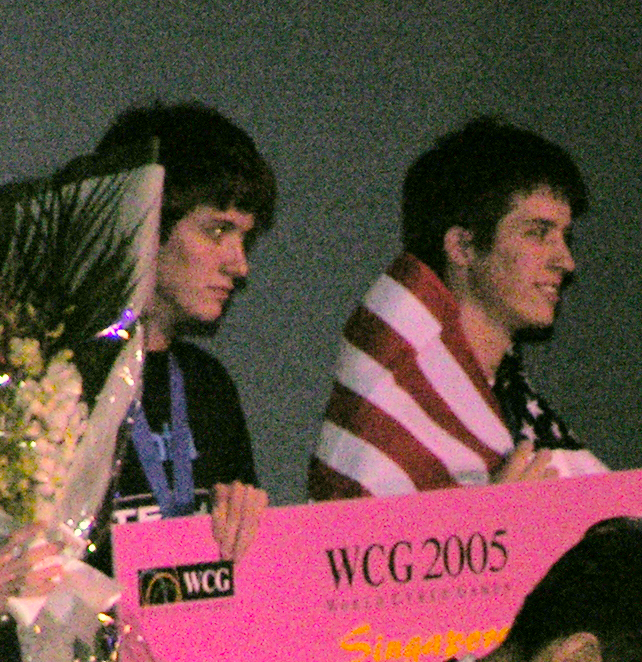
- The Ogre Twins at WCG 2005

Personal information
- Name: Dan Ryan
- Born: August 3, 1986 (age 40); Pickerington, Ohio, US

Career information
- Games: Halo: CE; Halo 2; Halo 3; Halo: Reach
- Playing career: Until 2009

Team history
- 2004: Team Domination
- 2005: Team 3D
- 2006–2008: Final Boss

Dan Ryan, better known as Ogre 1, is an American former professional Halo player, widely considered one of the greatest professional players of the game. He had 32 Halo championship tournament wins (the second highest of all time) and maintains the position of the highest-average placing professional player in Halo esports history.

In January 2003, Ryan started his career as a professional Halo gamer under the pseudonym Ogre 1. In 2005, he and his twin brother, Tom Ryan (Ogre 2), won first place in the first international Halo 2 tournament, the World Cyber Games, officially recognizing them as the best Halo 2 players in the world.

In 2006, he returned with his team as a member of the Major League Gaming (MLG) four-on-four team Final Boss, where they become the most successful professional Halo team of all time. In June 2006, he signed a three-year contract with MLG worth 250,000 dollars, as well as significant sponsorships with both Red Bull and NBA player Gilbert Arenas.

Ryan has been featured in Electronic Gaming Monthly and BPM. He also appeared in all of the Boost Mobile MLG Pro Circuit episodes on USA Network in 2006.

== Early life ==
Ryan was born in Pickerington, Ohio and grew up in Columbus, Ohio.

== Gaming career ==
Ryan began his professional gaming career at age 17, playing at small local tournaments along with Tom Ryan, his twin brother who plays as OGRE 2. The two began to get involved with professional gaming after much success. Since then, he has been a member of Halo: Combat Evolved, Halo 2 and Halo 3 teams, receiving a significant amount of media and gamer attention for finishing in the top of their tournaments and leagues. Some such teams include Team 3D's Halo 2 team, Team StK, Team 3D, Final Boss. He and his brother also represented the United States in the Halo 2 competition at the 2005 World Cyber Games in Singapore, defeating the Canadian team to secure a first-place finish.

As part of Final Boss along with OGRE 2, Saiyan, and Walshy, he helped the team to win two consecutive Major League Gaming National Championships in 2004 and 2005, before finishing the 2006 season by placing second to Team Carbon in a close 4–6 match. After this loss, the team dropped Saiyan. Until the arrival of the 2008 season, the Ogre brothers had not finished below 2nd place in a tournament. As the 2008 season started, it seemed as if Final Boss would pick up where they left off, winning the first Halo 3 event, MLG Meadowlands, by defeating Team Classic. After placing 5th and 7th at the next two events, Final Boss dropped player Walshy to pick up another high-profile player Neighbor, previously with the team Str8 Rippin,

Ryan formally retired from Final Boss and the professional Halo scene before the start of the 2009 Pro Circuit. He competed casually at Meadowlands 2009 with a group of friends under the team name The Incredibles. He has competed casually and professionally in various Oceania Halo tournaments, once traveling to the MLG Dallas 2012 to compete with the Australian MLG team "Immunity", where they placed 9th-12th, the highest placing ever achieved by an Oceania Halo team.

== Personal life ==
In 2009 after he retired from professional esports, Ryan moved to Australia where his partner lived. Currently, Ryan lives in Australia with his wife and child. He is a partnered streamer on Twitch, and continues to support the local and international Esports and Halo scene.

== Select tournaments ==
=== Halo: Combat Evolved ===
Date	Location	Team 4v4	Team 2v2	Free For All	Team	Ref
11/30/2003	AGP 3 Nashville	1st			Shoot to Kill	
4/4/2004	MLG Philadelphia Halo Nationals	1st	1st	1st	Shoot to Kill	
4/18/2004	MLG Dallas	1st	2nd		Shoot to Kill	
6/20/2004	MLG Chicago Midwest Mayhem	2nd	1st		Shoot to Kill	
7/25/2004	MLG Atlanta Halo 50K3	2nd	1st	2nd	Shoot to Kill	
8/22/2004	MLG Seattle	1st	1st	2nd	Domination	
10/26/2004	MLG New York National Championships	1st			Domination	
7/31/2005	MLG Philadelphia	1st	1st	1st	Team 3D	

=== Halo 2 ===
Date	Location	4v4	2v2	Free for All	Team	Ref
1/30/2005	MLG Washington D.C.	1st			Shoot to Kill	
2/27/2005	MLG San Francisco	1st	1st	1st	Shoot to Kill	
3/14/2005	MLG Houston	1st			Shoot to Kill	
4/24/2005	MLG Orlando	1st			Team 3D	
6/26/2005	MLG St. Louis	1st		3rd	Team 3D	
7/10/2005	CPL World Tour Championship	1st			Team 3D	
7/31/2005	MLG Philadelphia	2nd		1st	Team 3D	
9/10/2005	World Cyber Games USA Qualifier, New York City		1st		Team 3D	
10/16/2005	MLG LA Western Conference Championship	1st		3rd	Team 3D	
11/20/2005	World Cyber Games 2005, Suntec City, Singapore		1st		Team 3D	
11/27/2005	MLC Atlanta Eastern Conference Championship	1st			Team 3D	
12/10/2005	MLG Chicago Central Conference Championship	1st			Team 3D	
2/26/2006	MLG New York City National Championships	1st			Team 3D	
4/23/2006	MLG New York	1st			Final Boss	
5/21/2006	MLG Dallas	1st			Final Boss	
6/25/2006	MLG Anaheim	1st			Final Boss	
7/23/2006	MLG Chicago	1st			Final Boss	
8/27/2006	MLG Orlando	2nd			Final Boss	
10/15/2006	MLG New York City Playoffs	2nd			Final Boss	
11/19/2006	MLG Las Vegas: National Championships	2nd			Final Boss	
4/15/2007	MLG Charlotte	1st			Final Boss	
6/10/2007	MLG Meadowlands	1st			Final Boss	
7/22/2007	MLG Dallas	2nd			Final Boss	
8/19/2007	MLG Chicago	1st			Final Boss	
9/23/2007	MLG Orlando	2nd			Final Boss	
10/14/2007	MLG Las Vegas National Championship	1st			Final Boss	
11/5/2007	MLG Canadian Open	1st			Final Boss	
