= Tsquared =

American professional esports player

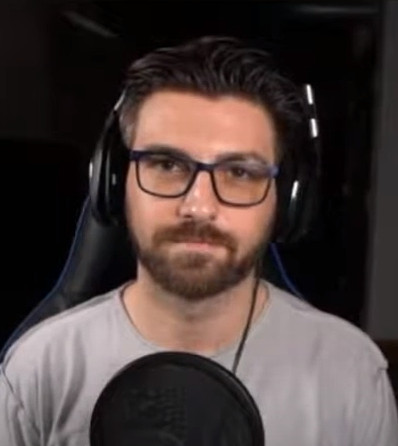
- Taylor in 2020

Personal information
- Name: Tom Taylor
- Born: 1986 or 1987 (age 38–39); Syracuse, New York, United States

Career information
- Games: Halo: Combat Evolved; Halo 2 Halo 3 Halo: Reach; Gears of War; Battlefield 3

Team history
- 2005–2010, 2014–2015: Str8 Rippin
- 2011: Instinct

Tom Taylor, known by the gamertag Tsquared (born 1986 or 1987), is a former professional gamer and captain of the team Str8 Rippin, which has had notable success in Major League Gaming (MLG), and was also the coach of Status Quo during the 2010 National Championships in Dallas where he helped them place 2nd behind Final Boss. Making him one of the only players to also coach an event. He signed a contract with MLG valued at around US $250,000 and earned between $120,000 and $150,000 annually in prize money and endorsement deals. He founded a company called Gaming Lessons that provides tutoring for aspiring professional gamers, particularly in the Halo series. Several other professional gamers from MLG have also worked as instructors at Gaming Lessons. He operates a YouTube channel with over 10,000 subscribers featuring approximately 24 hours worth of content.

Tsquared has appeared in MTV's documentary series True Life: I'm a Professional Gamer and on Icons, and has been mentioned in various publications including The Wall Street Journal. He also appeared as part of Stuff magazine's list of 20 most influential people under the age of 30 in August 2006. He appears occasionally on X-Play to provide tips for various online games.

From 2008–2009, Tsquared was featured on over 175 million Dr Pepper bottles issued across the United States as part of a promotional sponsorship for MLG. He currently serves as a GameSpot ambassador.

In November 2015, Tsquared returned to competitive Halo as the leader of the revived Str8 Rippin team during Season 1 of the Halo Championship Series.

On 3 April 2015, Tsquared announced his retirement from competitive Halo during a livestream on Twitch.

== Tournament placements ==
- MLG New York Championships 2004 – 4th
- MLG New York Championships 2005 – 5 – 6th
- MLG Las Vegas Championships 2006 – 3rd
- MLG Las Vegas Championships 2007 – 3rd
- MLG Las Vegas Championships 2008 – 1st
- MLG Orlando Championships 2009 – 6th
- MLG Providence Championships 2011 – 20th
- MLG Winter Championship 2012 – 13-16th
- ESL MCC Launch Invitational 2nd
- 2015 Halo Championship Series Season 1 – 5th

== Personal life ==
Taylor was born and raised in Syracuse, New York then moved to Florida in 2001 to attend high school. In 2009 he and Str8 Rippin moved to a gaming house in Orlando, Florida.

In 2011 Tsquared appeared on the YouTube reality television series The Controller: Battlefield 3.
