= Entoi =

South Korean blogging service

- Entoi's homepage in 2003
- Website type: Blog; Online community
- Available in: Korean
- Owner: NHN
- Creator: NHN
- Website: www.entoi.com
- Commercial: Yes
- Launched: September 2, 2003; 23 years ago
- Current status: Defunct (Closed on December 9, 2004)

Entoi (Korean: 엔토이) was an online service operated by NHN (Note: NHN was established in 2000 through the merger of Navercomm and Hangame Communications. In 2013, NHN's Hangame division was spun off into NHN Entertainment, and the surviving entity changed its name to Naver.) from 2003 to 2004. Alongside the search engine Naver and the gaming portal Hangame, it was positioned as one of NHN's three major flagship services.

Entoi was an entertainment-oriented blogging platform based on a "Star-Fan system." Users could upload various original content to their personal blogs to gather followers ("fans") and achieve the status of an online "star." Throughout this process, users could exchange a form of virtual currency called Uyu (literally "milk"). The website's official slogan was "A world that calls me a star."

Following a year of planning and development, Entoi underwent a beta testing phase in August 2003 and officially launched its paid services in September 2003. Conceptualized as one of NHN's most promising business ventures, it initially garnered explosive interest from netizens. However, its popularity rapidly declined as the core "Star-Fan" economic cycle failed to function effectively due to several systemic issues. In response, NHN implemented measures such as making the service entirely free and adding a direct shortcut link on the Naver portal homepage. Despite these efforts, the platform failed to achieve significant growth. Late in 2004, Entoi was integrated into Hangame as an internal feature before ultimately being shut down.

== Features ==
=== Star-Fan System and Uyu ===
When a newly registered user opened a blog on Entoi and uploaded their personal profile photos, they were granted the status of a "pre-star," and any netizens visiting their blog were regarded as "fans." A user officially achieved the status of a "star" once their follower count exceeded 100. Fans visiting a star's blog could view and enjoy the content, and in return, award the star with a form of virtual currency called Uyu (literally "milk"). Stars could then use the accumulated currency to access various premium services and benefits provided by the platform. Consequently, this mechanism encouraged users to become stars by actively collecting currency, serving as the core engine driving the cyclical structure of the "Star-Fan system."

Regarding this setup, NHN promoted the platform as a pioneering "C2C" (Customer-to-Customer) monetization model where content production and distribution occurred voluntarily among users. This was heavily contrasted with the dominant "B2C" (Business-to-Consumer) models of the era, which relied on purchasing digital avatars or paid subscriptions, framing Entoi as a highly differentiated and innovative revenue model.

The unit for the virtual currency Uyu was "cc" (cubic centimeters). Upon initial registration, users were given a baseline allowance of 50,000 cc, and an additional 100 cc was rewarded for logging in once per day. Furthermore, purchasing items in the marketplace returned 50% of the purchase price back in Uyu. Unlike typical internet mileage programs where users passively accumulated rewards, Entoi required users to expend their own Uyu to access specific internal features. Notably, fans spent currency whenever they visited a star's blog, and users were also charged Uyu to copy another user's post onto their own blog.

The platform also featured an auction service called "Uyu Auction," a conventional bidding system where specific items were awarded to the user who bid the highest amount of currency within a set timeframe. While low-to-mid-tier consumer electronics, such as Polaroid cameras or webcams, were standard offerings, a high-end Volkswagen New Beetle valued at 30 million KRW was placed on the auction block in December 2003, with a bidding deadline set for 10:00 PM on December 3. This specific event drew criticism from media outlets, arguing that auctioning a luxury automobile was inappropriate for a website whose primary demographic consisted of teenagers.

=== Functions ===
Unlike conventional blogging platforms of the early 2000s that relied almost exclusively on text posts and comments, Entoi distinguished itself by integrating a suite of multimedia tools and features:

- ToyToy – A dedicated instant messaging space that connected stars with their fans. It provided real-time notifications regarding a star's activities, such as content updates, allowing fans to navigate to the new content quickly. The messenger also contained a separate "mini-blog" space and a built-in radio feature called "Toy Broadcasting," which allowed users to stream music channels divided by unique frequencies.
- Toy Channel – A multimedia communication hub hosting video chatting, virtual fan meetings, and a specialized "norae-chatting" feature that combined online karaoke with live chat rooms.
- Stage – A dedicated promotional zone within the platform where users could showcase, advertise, and distribute content created on their blogs.
- Toy – The avatar system used on Entoi, which featured a designated species capable of expressing distinct emotions through cute animations.
- Toy Village – A central navigational lobby connecting individual user blogs to the platform's various standalone services.
- Toy Shop – A digital marketplace where users purchased decorative items to customize their personal blog spaces.

In addition, Entoi offered premium paid services including web hosting folders and a music video creation tool. The music video creator allowed users to upload photos to their blog and select a background track, which then automatically synthesized a customized music video. The service was free for the first ten creations, after which a fee of 500 KRW per video was charged.

=== Songs ===
Following the closure of the platform, Entoi remains widely recognized in South Korean internet culture for its collection of proprietary promotional tracks collectively known as "Entoi Songs." Capitalizing on the viral 'yeopgi' (bizarre/quirky) song craze sweeping the country in 2003, these tracks were produced as children's folk-style melodies accompanied by colorful Flash animation music videos. The songs achieved significant commercial success, transitioning into mainstream culture as popular mobile phone ringtones and ringback tones.

- "Number Song" (숫자송, Sutja-song) – The most widely recognized track from the platform, featuring lyrics that form a ten-line acrostic love confession using rhyming puns based on the numbers one (il) through ten (sip). Released alongside the initial launch of Entoi, the song was created by recruiting Jo Jae-yoon and Kim Hee-bin, the duo behind the viral "Carrot Song" (당근송). (Note: The two creators later formed the indie band Kyrie in 2006, performing under the stage names Maki and Yu Han-la, respectively.) The track received an immediate, massive response upon release.
- "Cold Song" (감기송, Gamgi-song) – A follow-up track to the "Number Song" themed around catching a cold.
- "Star Song" (스타송, Seuta-song) – A follow-up track focused on the theme of Entoi's internal "stars."
- "Carol Song" (캐롤송) – A seasonal track utilizing a classic Christmas carol concept.
- "Want You Song" (원츄송, Wonchu-song) – A track featuring a repetitive chorus derived from the English phrase "I want you."
- "Ganada Trot" (가나다 트로트) – Similar to the "Number Song," this track was a love confession utilizing an acrostic structure based on the sequential letters of the Hangul alphabet, running from Ga (가) to Ha (하). The intro segment, which begins with the rhythmic chant "Take a one-beat rest, take a two-beat rest...", was later adopted verbatim as the opening introduction theme for the segment "Master of Quizzes: Say It Backwards, Aha!" during the early years of the popular MBC variety show Infinite Challenge.

== History ==
=== Launch ===
The planning and development phase for Entoi spanned 15 months, beginning around June 2002. Although the initial Entoi development team consisted of only five employees, NHN aggressively scaled up its investment as the launch approached, expanding the department to 50 personnel by 2003 and eventually reaching 100 staff members. A beta testing phase commenced in August 2003, during which the platform successfully accumulated approximately 30,000 active blogs.

NHN officially launched the live service of Entoi on September 2, 2003, announcing its intention to establish the platform as one of the corporation's core flagship businesses. Coinciding with the official launch, the baseline virtual currency granted upon registration was increased tenfold from 5,000 cc to 50,000 cc. On September 18, NHN rolled out an incentive program that returned 50% of the purchase price back in Uyu when users bought premium items in the shop.

Immediately following its launch, Entoi garnered immense public interest, drawing in approximately 2,000 new users daily. On September 9, the platform initiated a promotional marketing campaign centered around offline ulzzang (internet-famous good-looking individuals) competitions, driving daily registrations to an all-time peak of 10,000 users. For the month of September, Entoi recorded a daily average of roughly 60,000 unique visitors, ranking second in the domestic blogging market just behind Cyworld. (Note: According to a September 2003 market survey by Rankey.com.) Late in September, NHN launched a promotional event featuring professional StarCraft players competing for popularity via their Entoi blogs. Running through November, this campaign featured high-profile active esports players including Lim Yo-hwan (BoxeR), Hong Jin-ho (YellOw), Park Kyeong-Rak, and Seo Ji-hun (XellOs).

=== Stagnation and closure ===
Despite the initial momentum, the platform's foundation began to falter as the core "Star-Fan system" failed to cultivate spontaneous user interaction as originally envisioned. Media critics pointed out that targeting teenagers, a demographic with low purchasing power, was a significant strategic error. Furthermore, achieving the status of a "star" proved unrealistic for the vast majority of users who lacked individual content creation capabilities. While a select group of internet celebrities (such as ulzzangs), web novelists, and cartoonists successfully drove engagement, the general user base functioned strictly as consumers, disrupting the self-sustaining C2C economic cycle. According to data from internet research firm Metrics, unique weekly visitors plummeted from 1.14 million during the first week of September to just 320,000 within a single month.

In an effort to reverse this decline, NHN shifted to an entirely free-to-use policy in late October 2003. Proclaiming an "Infinite Free Transformation" initiative, NHN provided unlimited blog storage starting October 15, eliminated fees for web folders and the music video tool, and ran promotions offering free decorative theme items. On October 27, the platform modified its Uyu currency distribution model: users received a bonus of 100 cc for their first login each day, and Entoi began covering the currency fees that fans previously had to pay to visit a star's blog. Additionally, during a major overhaul of the Naver portal user interface on December 9, 2003, NHN added a prominent direct link shortcut to Entoi on Naver's main page.

Following the shift to a free model, weekly unique visitors briefly recovered, crossing 1.26 million in the final week of October 2003. Around this time, the total number of stars and pre-stars combined surpassed 110,000. Weekly unique visitors hovered at 1.19 million into the first week of December 2003. However, engagement metrics remained low, with page views for that same week tracking at 14.82 million—roughly half of the volume recorded during Entoi's opening week.

As growth stagnated into 2004, NHN began planning to consolidate Entoi into its gaming portal, Hangame, starting in August 2004. As part of this transition, a feature allowing users to save Hangame's Flash-based games directly onto their Entoi mini-homepages was introduced in October 2004. On December 2, 2004, NHN officially announced the discontinuation of Entoi, and the service was entirely terminated on December 9 upon the completion of the integration process. At the time of its closure, Entoi's registered user base stood at 800,000.

The core infrastructure of Entoi was absorbed into Hangame to bolster its community features. Individual services such as "Toy Hompy" and "Entoi Broadcasting" continued operations under the names "Hangame Hompy" and "Hangame Broadcasting." Following the shutdown, existing Entoi users were given until January 2005 to apply for a data transfer and migration to a Hangame user account.

== See also ==
- Naver Blog – An early alternative blogging service launched by NHN in 2003, originally known as "Naver Paper".
