= Mike Sepso =

American esports entrepreneur (born 1972)

- Born: Michael Sepso; June 25, 1972 (age 54); Bridgeport, Connecticut, US
- Known for: Major League Gaming; Esports

Michael Sepso (born June 25, 1972) is an American video game, media and technology entrepreneur and co-founder and CEO of Vindex, a gaming and esports technology infrastructure business. He was the co-founder of Major League Gaming(MLG), a professional esports league and media company acquired by video game publisher Activision Blizzard in December 2015

== Life and career ==
=== Major League Gaming ===
Major League Gaming (MLG) is arguably the first professional esports organization. Headquartered in New York City, MLG holds official video game tournaments throughout the United States and Canada. MLG's aim from its founding was to bring computer and console game competitions to the level of spectator sports in terms of competition and production value.

Early on, MLG was kept afloat exclusively through financing from its founders. In 2006, Oak Investment Partners, a local venture capital firm, invested in MLG and by 2012 it had invested nearly $60 million in the league.

In 2006, MLG broadcast their Halo 2 Pro Series on USA Network as the TV program Boost Mobile MLG Pro Circuit. With the broadcast, MLG became the first televised video game console gaming league in the United States. The Boost Mobile MLG Pro Circuit ran until 2007, and was also featured on ESPN.com, and other sites.

In 2013, MLG.tv, MLG's website, launched video streaming. The online-only platform was one of the first for streaming esports, closely following the spinoff from Justin.tv into Twitch.tv in the summer of 2011. Sepso said of MLG.tv, which would later be a driving factor in Activision Blizzad's acquisition of the company: "The past two or three years started to explode because of online video. While we early on did bring MLG to television, the reality is our audience lives online."

In October of 2014, MLG opened the MLG.tv Arena in Columbus, Ohio. The 14,000 square feet arena is located near Easton Town Center and the campus of Ohio State University. MLG.tv arena's first live event was the MLG Pro League Call of Duty: Advanced Warfare Season 3 Playoffs.
