= Galactic Order =

Online gaming community

Galactic Order (founded in 2004) is an online gaming community and esports organization originating from a group of competitive online gamers, primarily focused on first-person shooter and strategy games.

== History ==
GRM Gaming established its presence in popular PC titles of the era. The organization was characterized by a strong emphasis on community structure, often employing a hierarchical order or rank system, which inspired the "Galactic Order" portion of its name.

The organization was most active on its primary community website, GRMgaming.net. that made a concerted effort to transition into a more formal esports organization. The organisation expanded its activities across multiple video game titles and platforms, including Halo, Call of Duty, League of Legends and StarCraft II and other major multiplayer games. It developed alliances with other gaming communities and introduced structured ranking systems within its membership.

GRM launched a specialized competitive portal, GRMesports.com, which served as a hub for team rosters, match results, and news.

GRM teams have participated in various amateur and semi-pro leagues, including the MLG Pro Circuit, GameBattles, and various independent PC gaming leagues.
