= Sang-wook =

- Hangul: 상욱
- RR: Sanguk
- MR: Sanguk

Sang-wook is a Korean given name.

== People ==
People with this name include:

- Kim Sang-wook (fencer) (born 1964), South Korean fencer
- Ji Sang-wook (born 1965), South Korean politician (Saenuri Party)
- Lee Sang-wook (born 1971), Korean American actor known as Will Yun Lee
- Park Sang-wook (actor) (born 1976), South Korean actor
- Joo Sang-wook (born 1978), South Korean actor
- Jeon Sang-wook (footballer) (born 1979), South Korean football player
- Kevin Na (born Na Sangwook, 1983), South Korean-born American golfer
- Lee Sang-wook (born 1985), South Korean artistic gymnast
- Park Sang-wook (footballer) (born 1986), South Korean football player
- Jeon Sang-wook (esports player) (born 1987), South Korean professional StarCraft player
- Kim Sang-wook (ice hockey) (born 1988), South Korean ice hockey player
- Sang-Wook Cheong, South Korean materials scientist at Rutgers University

== See also ==
- List of Korean given names
