= GH057ayame =

American professional sports player

Personal information
- Name: Eric Hewitt
- Born: 1987 or 1988 (age 37–38)
- Nationality: American

Career information
- Games: Halo 2; Halo 3; Halo: Reach

Eric Hewitt, also by his tag GH057ayame (Ghostayame), is a retired professional Major League Gaming (MLG) gamer. He now works for 343 Industries working on future Halo games.

== Career ==
Raised in Westfield, New Jersey, Hewitt attended Pennsylvania State University and became a member of Carbon in August 2006 under the gamertag GH057ayame. Carbon's efforts were finally rewarded with the national Halo 2 4v4 Championship in 2006, followed by a 2nd-place finish in the 2007 Championship, beaten by former rivals Final Boss. Carbon struggled with the switch from Halo 2 to Halo 3 in 2008 and lost their dominance on the Pro Circuit. With three 7th-place finishes and only one top 4 finish throughout the season, Carbon ended the season with a surprising 3rd-place finish at the National Championships. After placing 8th in the first two tournaments in 2009, Carbon decided to drop Ghostayame, who took Walshy's place in Team Instinct for Dallas. But a bad performance (Ghostayame went -53 that tournament (all matches combined)) destroyed a further cooperation with Instinct, who decided to release Ghostayame after a 3rd place in Dallas. Only having played one tournament for Instinct, Ghostayame then joined Team Classic for Anaheim and ended up with a 6th place. He said that "Anaheim will be Judgement Day" for Instinct, which his team then beat 3–2 in Winner's Bracket Round 2, which felt like a "sweet revenge" for Ghostayame. In the end Classic even finished one place higher than Instinct, who only became 7th that tournament. In 2011, Hewitt branched out into Gears of War, hoping to compete in MLG play if the game is accepted into the tournament.

On January 14, 2014, 343 Industries announced that they had hired Hewitt.

== MLG ==
=== 2007 ===
Halo 2
Event	Championship 4v4	Championship FFA	Teammates
Charlotte	Team Carbon - 2nd	29th	Team Carbon

=== 2006 ===
Halo 2
Event	Championship 4v4	Championship FFA	Teammates
New York	Team Ex - 6th	6th	Team Ex - Cpt. Anarchy, MeLLoZ, PisToL
Dallas	Team Ex - 5th	10th	Team Ex - Cpt. Anarchy, MeLLoZ, PisToL
Anaheim	--	--	--
Chicago	Team Ex - 6th	11th	Team Ex - Cpt Anarchy, PisToL, MimiC
Orlando	Team Carbon	29th	Team Carbon
NY Playoffs	Team Carbon	11th	Team Carbon
Las Vegas National CC	Team Carbon	--	Team Carbon

==== Pro's Choice Awards ====
3rd Best Support Player

=== 2005 ===
Halo 2
Event	Championship 4v4	Championship FFA	Teammates
Washington D.C.	--	--	--
San Francisco	--	--	--
Houston	--	--	--
Orlando	--	--	--
St. Louis	--	--	--
Philadelphia	9th-12th	Top 256	CheeeseHead20, -12FloZ-hasNiceLegs, Phil22
Las Vegas	--	--	--1st
Nashville	--	--	--
Seattle	--	--	--
LA Western CC	7th-8th	4th	xXx, IIPisToLII, Levi
Atlanta Eastern CC	--	--	--
Chicago Central CC	5th-6th	Top 32	lGameI, MeLLoZ, IIPisToLII
NY National Championships	7th-8th	7th-8th	lGameI, MeLLoZ, IIPisToLII
