= Jeon Sang-wook =

Jeon Sang-wook (Korean: 전상욱) may refer to:

- Jeon Sang-wook (footballer) (born 1979), South Korean footballer
- Jeon Sang-wook (esports player) (born 1987), South Korean retired StarCraft player
