= World Cyber Games 2004 =

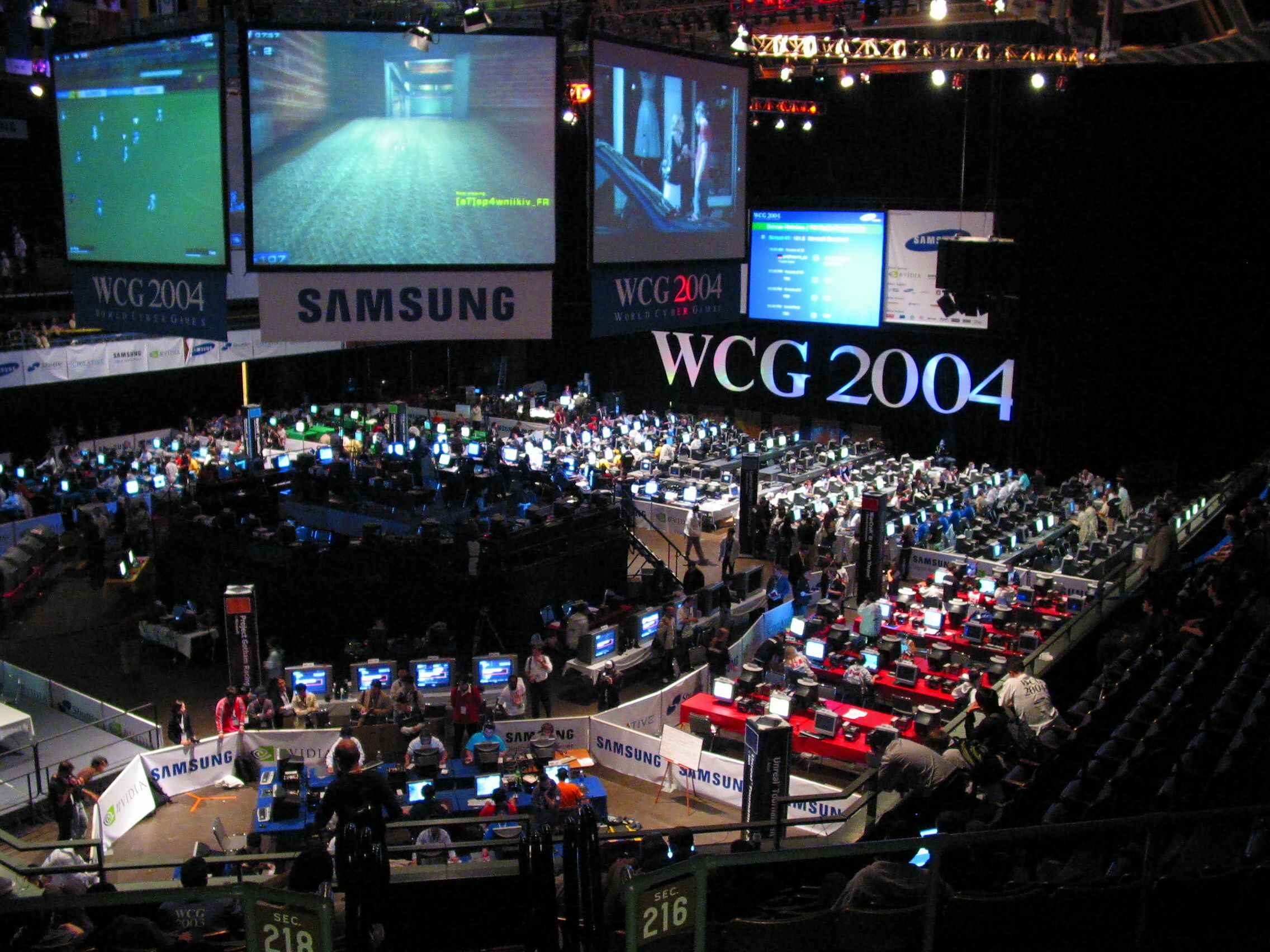
World Cyber Games 2004 were held at the Bill Graham Civic Auditorium in San Francisco

The World Cyber Games 2004 was held in San Francisco, California, United States from the October 6–10. It was the first ever World Cyber Games to be held outside of Korea.

== Official games ==
=== PC games ===
- Counter-Strike: Condition Zero
- FIFA Football 2004
- Need for Speed: Underground
- StarCraft: Brood War
- Unreal Tournament 2004
- Warcraft III: The Frozen Throne

=== Xbox games ===
- Halo: Combat Evolved
- Project Gotham Racing 2

== Results ==
Event	Gold		Silver		Bronze	
Counter-Strike: Condition Zero	Team 3D (United States)	Johnny Quach (boms)	Titans (Denmark)	Richard Halgaard (Drally)	MaveN (South Korea)	Jeong-Tak Oh (BeBe)
Counter-Strike: Condition Zero	Team 3D (United States)	Dave Geffon (Moto)	Titans (Denmark)	Andreas Andreassen (KK)	MaveN (South Korea)	Young-Mo Ahn (enemy)
Counter-Strike: Condition Zero	Team 3D (United States)	Salvatore Garozzo (Volcano)	Titans (Denmark)	Jonas Svendsen (whiMp)	MaveN (South Korea)	Jun-Keon Jung (rishNarchK)
Counter-Strike: Condition Zero	Team 3D (United States)	Kyle Miller (Ksharp)	Titans (Denmark)	Simon Kullenberg (eGene)	MaveN (South Korea)	Min-Woo Choi (cliper)
Counter-Strike: Condition Zero	Team 3D (United States)	Ronald Kim (Rambo)	Titans (Denmark)	Mike Lutzhoeft (spx)	MaveN (South Korea)	Beum-Ho Choi (mal)
FIFA 2004	(South Korea) Dae-Han Choi (Volcano)		(Brazil) Bruno Carrico (g3x.Carrico)		(Germany) Daniel Rasche (aL_smeyer)	
Need For Speed: Underground	(Germany) Niklas Timmermann ([pG]Sliver)		(South Korea) Myung-Chun Yoo (LordOfGround)		(Brazil) Andre Luiz Coliado de Macedo (andinhovsen)	
Unreal Tournament 2004	(Netherlands) Laurens Pluymaekers (fnatic.Lauke)		(Germany) Maurice Engelhardt (mouz.Burnie)		(Ukraine) Roman Verenko (Chip_MasK)	
WarCraft III	(Netherlands) Manuel Schenkhuizen (4K.Grubby)		(South Korea) Tae-Min Hwang(SK.Zacard)		(France) Yoan Merlo (4K.ToD)	
StarCraft	(South Korea) Ji-Hun Seo (XellOs[yG])		(South Korea) Jeon Sang-wook (Midas[gm])		(Bulgaria) Christian Drechsler (BeasT)	
Halo: Combat Evolved	(United States) Matt Leto (Zyos)		(Canada) Nelson Triana (Junior)		(United States) David Walsh (Walshy)	
Project Gotham Racing 2	(Netherlands) Arthur Vankan (KingTuur)		(Austria) Juergen Unger (Sackl)		(Netherlands) Max Haverkamp Begemann (Prooff)	
