= World Cyber Games 2003 =

The World Cyber Games 2003 was held in Seoul, South Korea from October 12th to the 18th. Approximately 600,000 competitors participated and 562 players advanced to the Grand Final. Total prize money was $350,000. It was the fourth edition of the World Cyber Games.

== Official games ==
=== PC Games ===
- Age of Mythology
- FIFA Soccer 2003
- HALF-LIFE: Counter-Strike
- StarCraft: Brood War
- Unreal Tournament 2003
- WarCraft III: Reign of Chaos

=== Console Games ===
- Halo

== Results ==
| Event | Gold | | Silver | | Bronze | |
| Age of Mythology | (Germany) Andrew James Regendatz (pgfire) | | (Taiwan) Jr. Cheng Chen (IamShiauTz) "" | | (Taiwan) Yu-Jen Wu (Iamsky_tw) "" | |
| FIFA Soccer 2003 | (Germany) Dennis Schellhase (SK_styla) | | (Germany) Daniel Schellhase (SK_hero) | | (South Korea) Dae-Han Choi (Volcano) | |
| HALF-LIFE: Counter-Strike | SK Gaming (Sweden) | Michael Korduner (ahl) | Team3D (United States) | Johnny Quach (boms) | Team9 (Denmark) | Ebbe Sønderskov (B!tch) |
| HALF-LIFE: Counter-Strike | SK Gaming (Sweden) | Emil Pathric William Christensen (HeatoN) | Team3D (United States) | Kyle Miller (Ksharp) | Team9 (Denmark) | Kenneth Larsen (jerry) |
| HALF-LIFE: Counter-Strike | SK Gaming (Sweden) | Abdisamad Mohamed (SpawN) | Team3D (United States) | Ronald Kim (Rambo) | Team9 (Denmark) | Mike Lutzhoeft (spx) |
| HALF-LIFE: Counter-Strike | SK Gaming (Sweden) | Christer Eriksson (Fisker) | Team3D (United States) | Sean Morgan (Bullseye) | Team9 (Denmark) | Jonas Gundersen (calc) |
| HALF-LIFE: Counter-Strike | SK Gaming (Sweden) | Tommy Ingemarsson (Potti) | Team3D (United States) | Dave Geffon (Moto) | Team9 (Denmark) | Uffe Sønderskov (NituZ) |
| Starcraft: Brood-War | (South Korea) Yong-Bum Lee (Ogogo) | | (Germany) Fredrik Keitel (FiSheYe) | | (Canada) Guillaume Patry (Grrr_ca) | |
| Unreal Tournament 2003 | (Italy) Nicola Geretti (ForresT) | | (Netherlands) Laurens Pluymaekers (fnatic_Lauke) | | (Australia) Dominic Lewandowski (snoop_dx_au) | |
| WarCraft III: Reign of Chaos | (Bulgaria) Zdravko Georgiev (SK_Insomnia) | | (China) Bin Guo (Chinahuman) | | (Romania) Sorin Popescu (TeGEviscErator) | |

| Rank | Country/Area | Gold | Silver | Bronze |
| 1 | Germany | 3 | 2 | - |
| 2 | (Taiwan) Republic of China | 2 | 1 | 1 |
| 3 | South Korea | 2 | - | 1 |
| 4 | Netherlands | 1 | 2 | 1 |
| 5 | (United States) USA | 1 | 2 | - |
| 6 | Italy | 1 | - | 1 |
| 7 | Bulgaria | 1 | - | - |
| 7 | Sweden | 1 | - | - |
| 9 | France | - | 1 | 1 |
| 9 | Spain | - | 1 | 1 |
| 9 | United Kingdom | - | 1 | 1 |
| 12 | China | - | 1 | - |
| 12 | Kazakhstan | - | 1 | - |
| 14 | Australia | - | - | 1 |
| 14 | Canada | - | - | 1 |
| 14 | Denmark | - | - | 1 |
| 14 | Romania | - | - | 1 |
| 14 | Russia | - | - | 1 |
