= World Cyber Games 2005 =

International video game event in 2005

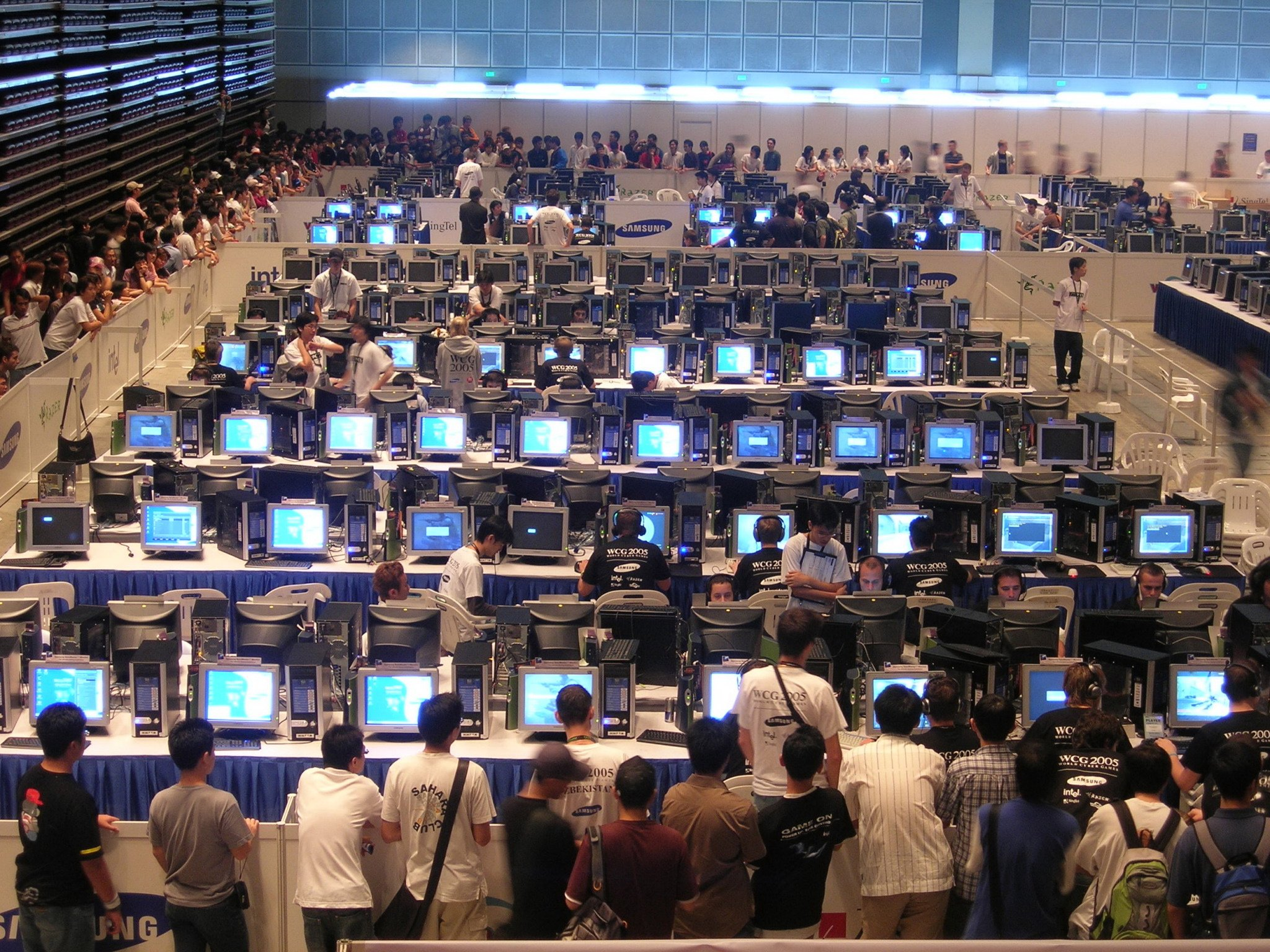
World Cyber Games Finals in Singapore 2005

The World Cyber Games 2005 was held in Singapore at Suntec Singapore International Convention and Exhibition Centre from 16 to 20 November 2005. There were over 800 players from 67 countries. Over 39,000 spectators turned up at the games to cheer for the players. The combined prize pool for the games was US$435,000.

== Games played at WCG 2005 ==
Official games

PC games

- Counter-Strike: Source
- FIFA Football 2005
- Need For Speed: Underground 2
- StarCraft: Brood War
- Warcraft III: The Frozen Throne
- Warhammer 40,000: Dawn of War

Xbox games

- Dead or Alive Ultimate
- Halo 2

Special tournament game

- freestyle

Mobile tournament games

- Bruce Lee
- Chopper Rescue
- Goolie
- Midtown Madness 3

Promotional event game

- Carom 3D

== Awards and medals ==
Classification	Game	Gold	Silver	Bronze	Fourth to eighth
Official games	Counter-Strike: Source	US$50 000	US$25 000	US$10 000	Prizes (total US$50 000)
Official games	Warcraft III: The Frozen Throne	US$40 000	US$10 000	US$5 000	Prizes (total US$5 000)
Official games	StarCraft: Brood War	US$20 000	US$10 000	US$5 000	Prizes (total US$5 000)
Official games	FIFA Football 2005	US$20 000	US$10 000	US$5 000	Prizes (total US$5 000)
Official games	Need For Speed: Underground 2	US$20 000	US$10 000	US$5 000	Prizes (total US$5 000)
Official games	Halo 2	US$20 000	US$10 000	US$5 000	Prizes (total US$10 000)
Official games	Warhammer 40,000: Dawn of War	US$20 000	US$10 000	US$5 000	Prizes (total US$5 000)
Official games	Dead or Alive Ultimate	US$15 000	US$10 000	US$5 000	Prizes (total US$5 000)
Mobile Tournament	Chopper Rescue	US$3,000	US$1,000	US ?	Prizes (total US$ ?)
Special tournament	freestyle	US$20 000			
Promotional Event	Carom 3D	US$3,000	US$2,000	US$1,000	Prizes (total US$ ?)

== Players' village ==
The Costa Sands Resort (Downtown East) in Singapore served as the WCG 2005 Players' Village. About 800 national representatives who advanced from the WCG 2005 national championships stayed at the Players' Village during the WCG 2005 Grand Final.

== Sponsors ==
Worldwide sponsor

- Samsung Electronics

Premier sponsors

- Intel
- Razer USA Ltd

Official sponsors

- Singapore Telecommunications
- Video Pro

Official suppliers

- ProCurve
- Kingston Technology
- Ablerex
- Seagate
- ASUS
- Foxconn
- Cooler Master
- VRnet
- DVDrama
- Radioitg

Host broadcaster

- MediaCorp

Official media partners

- Gameaxis
- HardwareZone
- Hardware Magazine
- PHOTO-i
- PC Magazine

Official gaming magazine

- Gameaxis
- Playworks

Official partners

- Blizzard Entertainment
- EA Sports
- EA Games
- Microsoft
- Tecmo
- THQ
- Valve
- Xbox Live

== Commentators ==
Online audio and video coverage was provided by Inside the Game.

Marcus Graham (djWHEAT)

Games covered: Counter-Strike: Source, Dead or Alive Ultimate, Halo 2

Stuart Saw (TosspoT)

Games covered: Counter-Strike: Source, Warcraft III: The Frozen Throne, FIFA Football 2005

Paul Chaloner (ReDeYe)

Games covered: Counter-Strike: Source, Need For Speed: Underground 2, FIFA Football 2005

Jason Hutchison (NiceGuyEd)

Games covered: Counter-Strike: Source, FIFA Football 2005, Need For Speed: Underground 2, Dead or Alive Ultimate, Halo 2

Christopher Iannitti (WaCKSteVeN)

Games covered: StarCraft: Brood War, Warcraft III: The Frozen Throne

Nicolas Plott (Tasteless)

Games covered: StarCraft: Brood War, Warhammer 40,000: Dawn of War

Kim Phan (bunny)

Games covered: StarCraft: Brood War, Warcraft III: The Frozen Throne

== Results ==
=== Official ===
Event	Gold		Silver		Bronze	
Counter-Strike: Source	Team3D (United States)	Josh Sievers (Dominator)	k23 (Kazakhstan)	Dauren Kystaubayev (AdreN)	Team EG (Canada)	Matt Stevenson (bl00dsh0t)
Counter-Strike: Source	Team3D (United States)	Michael So (method)	k23 (Kazakhstan)	Alexander Yakovlev (beAst)	Team EG (Canada)	Pasha Lari (LaRi)
Counter-Strike: Source	Team3D (United States)	Salvatore Garozzo (Volcano)	k23 (Kazakhstan)	Asset Sembiev (Solaar)	Team EG (Canada)	Griffin Benger (shaGuar)
Counter-Strike: Source	Team3D (United States)	Kyle Miller (Ksharp)	k23 (Kazakhstan)	Anvar Nasirov (anv1k)	Team EG (Canada)	Robert Tyndale (blackpanther)
Counter-Strike: Source	Team3D (United States)	Ronald Kim (Rambo)	k23 (Kazakhstan)	Nurtas Mamytbayev (Nur1k)	Team EG (Canada)	Jimmy Lin (Lin)
Need For Speed: Underground 2	(Brazil) Giovani Magri (GearGG)		(Brazil) Danilo Barros (N4_Godsmack)		(Russia) Konstantin Vanisov (USSR_MrKot)	
Warhammer 40,000: Dawn of War	(South Korea) Ryoo Kyung Hyun (TmG SeleCT)		(Brazil) André Zilio (TmG QuanChi)		(Germany) Simon Pletzer (TmG InSAnE)	
StarCraft: Brood War	(South Korea) Jae-Hoon Lee (fOru)		(Russia) Andrey Kukhianidze (3D Androide)		(Australia) Peter Neate (Legionnaire)	
Warcraft III: The Frozen Throne	(China) Li Xiaofeng (SKYCN)		(United States) Dennis Chan (BenQGeiLShort)		(Netherlands) Manuel Schenkhuizen (Grubby)	
FIFA Football 2005	(Germany) Dennis Schellhase (styla)		(Russia) Gusev Victor (x4Alexx)		(Spain) Moreno Torralbo (eDuYepp)	
Halo 2	Team3D(OGRES) (United States)	Dan Ryan (OGRE1)	Evil Geniuses (Canada)	Nelson Triana (Gspot)	Halo1style (France)	Maxime Billieres (MaCks_Myers)
Halo 2	Team3D(OGRES) (United States)	Tom Ryan (OGRE2)	Evil Geniuses (Canada)	Jason The (SadPanda)	Halo1style (France)	Philemon Kammer (phiL)
Dead or Alive Ultimate	(Japan) Tomoyuki Inui (Katsuninken)		(Singapore) Wilson Chia (Tetra)		(South Korea) Dong-Heon Han (Shinobi)	

=== Special ===
Event	Gold		Silver		Bronze	
FreeStyle	BOXOUT (South Korea)	Chung-Hee Kim	SAMASAMA (South Korea)	Hyung-Kwon Song	NicePlay (Taiwan)	Hsieh Chao-I
FreeStyle	BOXOUT (South Korea)	Song Sang-Yup	SAMASAMA (South Korea)	Jang Ju-Yuk	NicePlay (Taiwan)	Ma Te-Ru
FreeStyle	BOXOUT (South Korea)	Yun Bin	SAMASAMA (South Korea)	Jung Yong	NicePlay (Taiwan)	Chou Ming-Hung

=== Mobile ===
Event	Gold	Silver	Bronze
Bruce Lee	?	(Taiwan) Chang Ming-Tsung	(India) Kamal Arora
Chopper Rescue	(South Africa) Tammy Brook-Smith	(Philippines) Paul L. Antonio	?
Goolie	?	?	?
Midtown Madness 3	?	?	?

=== Promotional ===
Event	Gold	Silver	Bronze
Bruce Lee ASIA PACIFIC	?	(India) Kamal Arora	(Taiwan) Chang Ming-Tsung
Carom 3D	(Bulgaria) Kaloyan Botev	(Brazil) Luidy Fraga	(Spain) Jose Cubero

== Results by table ==
Rank	Nation	Gold	Silver	Bronze	Total
1	United States	2	1	0	3
2	South Korea	2	0	1	3
3	Brazil	1	3	0	4
4	Germany	1	0	1	2
5	Bulgaria	1	0	0	1
5	China	1	0	0	1
5	Japan	1	0	0	1
8	Russia	0	2	1	3
9	Canada	0	1	1	2
10	Kazakhstan	0	1	0	1
10	Philippines	0	1	0	1
10	Singapore	0	1	0	1
13	Spain	0	0	2	2
14	Australia	0	0	1	1
14	France	0	0	1	1
14	Netherlands	0	0	1	1
Totals (16 entries)		9	10	9	28

== Notable participant ==
- Verena Vlajo (Austria), the first female participant
