= Walshy =

American professional esports player

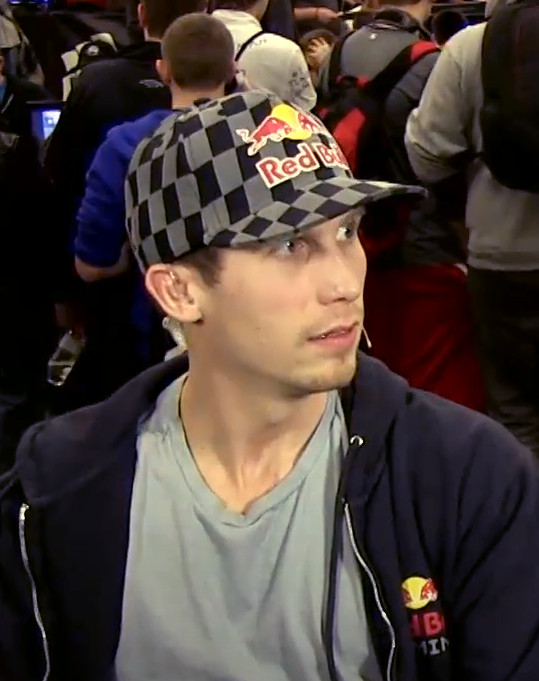
- Walsh in 2013

Personal information
- Name: Dave Walsh
- Born: 1984 or 1985 (age 41–42)
- Nationality: American

Career information
- Games: Halo: CE; Halo 2; Halo 3; Halo: Reach; Halo 4
- Playing career: 2004–2012

David Walsh is a retired American professional esports player. His professional career in gaming began in 2004 under the name Walshy. He is widely regarded as one of the greatest and most successful Halo players of all time.

== Early life ==
Walsh grew up in Grandville, Michigan. He graduated from Grandville High School in 2003. He was a member of the school's tennis and wrestling teams.[3] Prior to becoming a pro, he worked with his father at a post office in Grand Rapids. He decided to leave college after a year to pursue a gaming career.

== Career ==
=== Professional gaming ===
Walsh became a professional gamer in 2004. He co-led teams including FFA, DtO and Team 3D, eventually becoming the team captain of the Major League Gaming four-on-four team Final Boss from the 2004 season through July 23, 2008, when it was announced that Final Boss had released him from the team. He signed a contract with Red Bull. Walsh has been featured in Electronic Gaming Monthly, BPM, WZZM news station, Lansing State Journal, Game Informer Monthly, MTV, and The Grand Rapids Press.

Walsh is the second runner-up in MLG one-on-one championship and has also been shown on all of the Boost Mobile MLG Pro Circuit episodes on USA Network in 2006.After his former team, Final Boss, placed poorly at two of MLG's 2008 tournaments, (San Diego [7th], Orlando [5th]) his teammates (Ogre2, Ogre1, and Strongside) decided to drop him from the team for fellow MLG Pro Player Neighbor, formerly of Str8 Rippin.

He then played for Team Instinct with whom he placed second with at MLG Toronto ahead of his former team, Final Boss, who finished 3rd. When asked how it felt to beat his former team, he replied, "It was like taking candy from a baby, but I think the baby would have put up a better fight." Then soon after in MLG Dallas his new team Instinct placed 5th behind Final Boss, who placed 3rd once again.

In 2009, Walsh and Team Instinct dropped Soviet from the group and added Neighbor to their roster, with this new line-up they placed 2nd at MLG Meadowlands, ahead of Walsh's old team Final Boss. He was then dropped by Instinct and went into Dallas with his new team, Carbon, which placed 2nd. Following their 2nd-place finish in Dallas, in Anaheim 2009, Instinct placed 3rd. He also serves as a board member of Gamers Outreach Foundation—a charity that uses video games for various community projects.

On March 1, 2012, Walsh announced his retirement from competitive gaming.

=== Kiaeneto clothing line ===
In 2006 Walsh co-founded Kiaeneto, a line of clothing for gamers. On March 1, 2012, he said that he will no longer be working with Kiaeneto.

=== Author ===
Walsh wrote the Prima Games guide books on Battlefield 4, Titanfall, and illustrated maps on the Halo: The Master Chief Collection multiplayer map book.

=== Commentator ===
Walsh was a Halo commentator at the Winter Championships in Columbus on March 23–25, 2012.

== Personal life ==
Walsh serves on the board of directors of the Gamers Outreach Foundation. He started the virtual gaming chapter of the Entertainment Consumers Association.
