= XellOs =

South Korean esports player (born 1985)

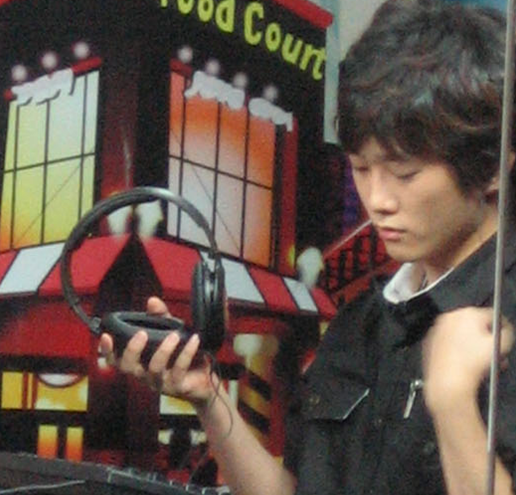
- XellOs in the MSL

Personal information
- Name: Seo Ji-hun
- Nickname(s): XellOs, XellOs[yG]
- Born: 9 February 1985 (age 41)
- Nationality: Republic of Korea

Career information
- Games: StarCraft
- Role: Terran

Team history
- CJ Entus
- 2009: Airforce ACE

Career highlights and awards
- WCG champion (2004)

Seo Ji-hun (born 9 February 1985) also known as his tag XellOs[yG] or simplified XellOs, is a professional South Korean StarCraft player of the Terran race. Seo won the 2003 Ongamenet Starleague and the World Cyber Games 2004 grand final.

== Early StarCraft career ==
Seo uses the Terran race. He first played StarCraft on a professional level during the 2001 Summer OSL Qualifiers. Later, in 2003 he was able to win the 2003 Olympus Ongamenet Starleague. At this time he was on CJ Entus. In September of the same year, Seo was able to come in third in the Korean Qualifiers. In October he won the 2004 World Cyber Games Grand Final. He was also able to place third in the You Are the Golf King MBCGame StarLeague. In the 2005 EVER OnGameNet StarLeague he was seen as a veteran who had the potential to win the title, but came in third place. In 2005 he came in first place in the World Cyber Games Progamer selection for StarCraft, but did not place in the main event. During this time period, he was given the nickname Perfect Terran.

== Later StarCraft career ==
Seo did not win any major tournaments from 2005 until 2009, although managed to make it into the semifinals of a tournament once in 2007. In February 2009 he started to serve his mandatory two year service for the Republic of Korea Air Force. In doing so he joined the professional StarCraft team Airforce ACE. In June 2009 he said that he had not played for 300 days, but played again in order to fulfill his service, and said that he will use his mentality to get back to playing the game. In 2010 he was asked to go to Korean Air's main hangar to watch the OSL, along with all of the other past winners, and accepted. In June 2010 he was ranked 103 with 71.4 points in KeSPA rankings.

== Tournament results ==
- 1st — 2003 Ongamenet Starleague
- 1st — World Cyber Games 2004

== See also ==
- StarCraft professional competition
