= List of Major League Gaming National Championships =

This is a list of Major League Gaming national championships, including results from 2004 to the present.

== 2004 - New York City ==
2004	Gold	Silver	Bronze	4th
Halo: Combat Evolved 4v4	(United States) Team Domination	(United States) Filthy Jackalopes	(United States) Business Decision	(United States) The Dream Team
Halo: Combat Evolved 2v2	(United States) Walshy/Ogre 1	(United States) Tupac/KillerN	(United States) Tsquared/Eleven	(United States) Saiyan/Ogre 2
Halo: Combat Evolved FFA	(United States) Zyos	(United States) OGRE 2	(United States) Walshy	(United States) AGJAX
Super Smash Bros. Melee 1v1	(United States) Ken Hoang	(United States) Isai Alvarado	(Japan) Captain Jack	(United States) Azen
Super Smash Bros. Melee 2v2	(United States) Ken/Isai	(United States) Azen/Wes	(United States) KishPrime/KishSquared	(United States) Eddie/Manacloud

== 2005 - New York City ==
2005	Gold	Silver	Bronze	4th
Halo 2 4v4	(United States) Team 3D	(United States) Team Phreaks	(United States) Str8 Rippin	(United States) XiT Woundz
Halo 2 FFA	(United States) Karma	(United States) Strongside	(United States) OGRE 1	(United States) Walshy
Super Smash Bros. Melee 1v1	(United States) Ken Hoang	(United States) ChuDat	(United States) PC Chris	(United States) Isai Alvarado
Super Smash Bros. Melee 2v2	(United States) Ken/Isai	(United States) Azen/Chillin	(United States) ChuDat/Manacloud	(United States) KishPrime/KishSquared

== 2006 - Las Vegas ==
2006	Gold	Silver	Bronze	4th
Halo 2 4v4	(United States) Team Carbon	(United States) Final Boss	(United States) Str8 Rippin	(United States) Legendz
Halo 2 FFA	(United States) Karma	(United States) StrongSide	(United States) Legit	(United States) OGRE 2
Super Smash Bros. Melee 1v1	(United States) PC Chris	(United States) KoreanDJ	(United States) Ken	(United States) Mew2King
Super Smash Bros. Melee 2v2	(United States) Ken Hoang/Isai	(United States) Chudat/ManaCloud	(United States) King/Mew2King	(United States) Husband/Wife

== 2007 - Las Vegas ==
2007	Gold	Silver	Bronze	4th
Halo 2 4v4	(United States) Team Final Boss	(United States) Team Carbon	(United States) Str8 Rippin	(United States) FBI The Agency
Halo 2 FFA	(United States) KGB Soviet	(United States) Cloud	(United States) Naded	(United States) Legit
Tom Clancy's Rainbow Six: Vegas 4v4	(United States) NeW eRa	(United States) Harmony N Havoc	(United States) Profe$$ional $kill$	(United States) RainbowSix Legends
Gears of War 4v4	(United States) Infinity	(United States) TH3 NSAN3Z	(United States) Vision	(United States) LGD Red
Shadowrun 4v4	(United States) Three Shot Killers	(United States) Shoot to Kill	(United States) Secret Weapon	(United States) UprisinG

== 2008 - Las Vegas ==
2008	Gold	Silver	Bronze	4th
Halo 3 4v4	(United States) Str8 Rippin	(United States) TCDS	(United States) Team Carbon	(United States) Team Final Boss
Gears of War 4v4	(United States) TH3 NSAN3Z	(United States) Infinity	(United States) FRAG | High Caliber	(United States) Dynasty ReTaLiaTioN
Tom Clancy's Rainbow Six: Vegas 2 1v1	(England) MoB Cameo	(United States) Iconz	(United States) Instill Fear	(United States) MoB LoSt CauSe
Call of Duty 4: Modern Warfare 4v4	(United States) xiNFecTioN	(United States) Team EnVyUs	(United States) Head Trauma	(United States) CA FeaR
World of Warcraft 3v3	(United States) Fnatic.Orz	(United States) Gravitas Gaming	(United States) Pandemic	(United States) Got Game West

== 2009 - Anaheim ==
2009	Gold	Silver	Bronze	4th
Call of Duty 4: Modern Warfare 4v4	(United States) iCn Xtravagant	(United States) BGR EnVyUs	(United States) DpG FeaR	(United States) MoB Genesis
Tom Clancy's Rainbow Six Vegas 2 4v4	(United States) RainbowSix Legends	(United States) EFX Rewritten	(United States) Vengeance	(United States) Carnage and Chaos

== 2009 - Orlando ==
2009	Gold	Silver	Bronze	4th
Halo 3 4v4	(United States) Believe the Hype	(United States) Classic	(United States) Carbon	(United States) Instinct
Gears of War 2 4v4	(United States) THE NSAN3Z	(United States) VisioN	(United States) Get Bronco	(United States) Infinity
World of Warcraft 3v3	(United States) coL.Black	(United States) coL.Red	(South Korea) Button Bashers	(United States) SK.EG

== 2010 - Dallas ==
2010	Gold	Silver	Bronze	4th
Halo 3 4v4	(United States) Team Final Boss	(United States) Status Quo	(United States) Instinct	(United States) Triggers Down
Halo 3 Bic Flex 4 FFA	(United States) lBulk	(United States) Krunchy	(United States) Amish Acorns	(United States) Phenom
Super Smash Bros. Brawl 1v1	(United States) Gnes	(United States) Tyrant	(United States) ESAM	(Canada) Ally
Super Smash Bros. Brawl 2v2	(Canada) (United States) Ally/Lee Martin	(United States) Nick Riddle/Shaky	(United States) DEHF/Gnes	(United States) ESAM/MVD
Tekken 6 1v1	(United States) ATL Anakin	(United States) GMMA Kor	(United States) NYC Fab	(South Korea) ATL Knee
Tekken 6 3v3	(United States) Anakin/Bronson/Trungy	(South Korea) Holeman/Knee/Nin	(United States) Pokchop/ShinBlade/Lil Majin	(United States) Crow/Kor/Mr Naps
Starcraft 2 1v1	(Sweden) Liquid`Jinro	(Canada) FnaticMSi.TT1	(United States) PainUser	(United States) Liquid`Tyler
Halo Reach 4v4	(United States) UoR SyA	(United States) Hot Shots	(United States) UoR Victorious Secret	(United States) Darkest Hour
Halo Reach Pro FFA	(United States) Hysteria	(United States) iGotUrPistola	(United States) Snip3down	(United States) OGRE 2
Call of Duty: Modern Warfare 2 4v4 (PS3)	(United States) Influence	(United States) VWS LeveraGe	(United States) HSG Xtravagant	(United States) OpTic Gaming

== 2011 - Providence ==
2011	Gold	Silver	Bronze	4th
Halo: Reach 4v4	(United States) eon Instinct	(United States) Warriors	(United States) TGN Believe The Hype	(United States) FnaticMSi
Halo: Reach Stride Pro 2v2	(United States) Lunchbox/Roy	(United States) Cloud/Clutch	(United States) OGRE 2/iGotUrPistola	(United States)
Halo: Reach Pro FFA	(United States) StrongSide	(United States) Heinz	(United States) TiZoXiC	(United States) Hysteria
Halo: Reach Bic Flex 4 FFA	(United States) SuperStr8Sick	(United States) Kampy	(United States) Titomatic	(United States) Hoaxer
Call of Duty: Black Ops 4v4	(United States) Quantic Nex-TT-hreat	(United States) eon EnVyUs	(United States) eon OpTic Gaming	(United States) SvG Collapse
Call of Duty: Black Ops Pro FFA	(Canada) Smither4226	(United States) Sharp	(United States) ASSASS1N	(United States) Merk
StarCraft 2 1v1	(South Korea) FXO.Leenock	(Sweden) coL.NaNiwa	(South Korea) coL.MVP.DongRaeGu	(South Korea) Q.IM.Mvp
League of Legends 5v5	(Canada) (United States) Team SoloMid	(United States) Epik Gamer	(United States) Team Dignitas	(United States) RFLX Gaming

== 2012 - Winter Championship - Columbus ==
2012	Gold	Silver	Bronze	4th
StarCraft 2 1v1	(South Korea) MarineKingPrime	(South Korea) MVP.DongRaeGu	(South Korea) coL.Heart	(Canada) EG.HuK
Halo: Reach 4v4	(United States) Status Quo	(United States) eon Instinct	(United States) Ambush	(United States) Dynasty
Halo: Reach FFA	(United States) Assault	(United States) Reliable	(United States) SN4K3B1T3	(United States) Enable
King of Fighters XIII 1v1	(Mexico) IGL_Bala	(United States) elive_Mr. KoF	(Mexico) vVv_Itz Romanc3	(United States) ArcadeShock|Reynald
Soul Calibur V 1v1	(France) Keev	(United States) RTD_ATL	(United States) Shin_RyuJin	(United States) Something-Unique
Mortal Kombat 1v1	(United States) vVv_CDjr	(United States) vVv_REO	(United States) VSM_Maxter	(United States) ATL_MON

== 2012 - Spring Championship - Anaheim ==
2012	Gold	Silver	Bronze	4th
StarCraft 2 1v1	(South Korea) MVP.DongRaeGu	(South Korea) SlayerS.Alicia	(South Korea) MarineKingPrime	(Sweden) Quantic.SaSe
King of Fighters XIII 1v1	(Mexico) IGL_Bala	(United States) ArcadeShock|Reynald	(Mexico) vVv_Romance	(Japan) MCZ_Tokido
Soul Calibur V 1v1	(France) Keev	(France) Kayane	(United States) LostProvidence	(United States) vVv_RTD ATL
Mortal Kombat 1v1	(United States) KN_DetroitBalln	(United States) DJT 1993	(United States) EMP_Perfect Legend	(United States) vVv_CDjr
League of Legends 5v5	(Canada) (United States) Team SoloMid	(United States) Counter Logic Gaming	(United States) Dignitas	(United States) Dynamic

== 2012 - Summer Championship - Raleigh ==
2012	Gold	Silver	Bronze	4th
StarCraft 2 1v1	(South Korea) FXOLeenock	(South Korea) LG-IM.First	(South Korea) LiquidTaeJa	(South Korea) Quantic.TheStC
Soul Calibur V 1v1	(United States) Xephukai	(United States) RamonTSF	(Mexico) FIT-lolomx	(France) Keev_
Mortal Kombat 1v1	(United States) OBS_EMP_REO	(United States) CDjr	(United States) VSM_Maxter	(United States) pig_of_the_hut
League of Legends 5v5	(United States) Team Curse*	(United States) Team Dignitas	(United States) Dynamic	(United States) Orbit Gaming

Note: Curse and Dignitas were both disqualified for involvement with a fixing scandal, which resulted in splitting the first and second place prize pools between third through sixth place.

== 2012 - Fall Championship - Dallas ==
2012	Gold	Silver	Bronze	4th
StarCraft 2 1v1	(South Korea) StarTale_Life	(South Korea) FXO.Leenock	(South Korea) StarTale_Bomber	(South Korea) KT.Flash
Halo 4 4v4	(United States) Warriors	(United States) Ambush	(United States) Status Quo	(United States) Legendary
Tekken Tag Tournament 2 1v1	(South Korea) JDCR	(South Korea) HelpMe	(United States) Anakin	(South Korea) Saint
Mortal Kombat 1v1	(United States) REO	(United States) VSM_Maxter	(United States) pig_of_the_hut	(United States) GGA_Dizzy
League of Legends 5v5	(South Korea) Azubu Blaze	(South Korea) NaJin Sword	(Europe) CLG.EU	(United States) CLG.NA

== 2013 - Winter Championship - Dallas ==
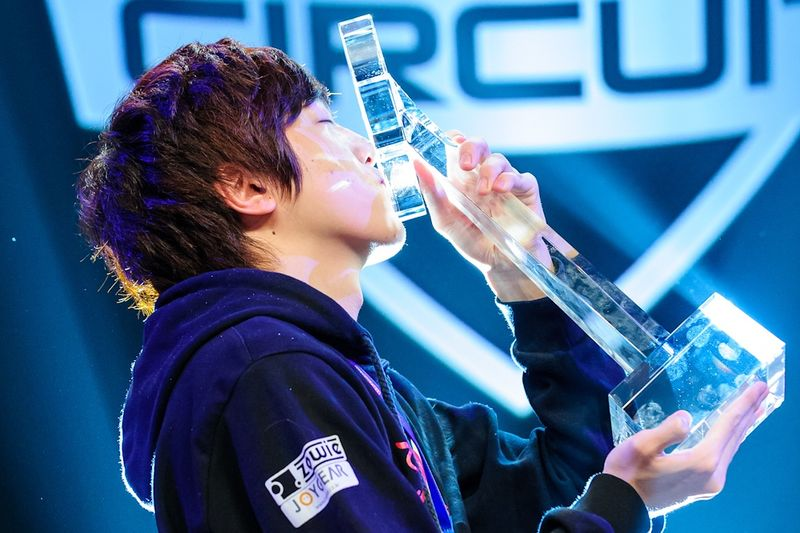
Life after winning the StarCraft II tournament.

2013	Gold	Silver	Bronze	4th
Call of Duty: Black Ops 2 4v4	(United States) Fariko Impact	(United States) UNiTE Gaming	(United States) vVv Gaming	(United States) compLexity
StarCraft 2 1v1	(South Korea) StarTale_Life	(South Korea) KT.Flash	(South Korea) STXSouL INnoVation	(South Korea) SK..MC
League of Legends Summer Promotion Qualifiers 5v5	(United States) Cloud9	(United States) Velocity eSports		
League of Legends International Exhibition 5v5	(South Korea) KT Rolster B	(Europe) Gambit Gaming		

== 2013 - Spring Championship - Anaheim ==
2013	Gold	Silver	Bronze	4th
Call of Duty: Black Ops 2 4v4	(United States) compLexity Gaming	(United States) Icons Impact	(United States) OpTic Gaming	(United States) Curse Gaming
StarCraft 2 1v1	(South Korea) CMStorm Polt	(South Korea) Quantic HyuN	(South Korea) Liquid`HerO	(Sweden) Alliance NaNiwa
League of Legends Promotion Finals 5v5	(United States) FXOpen eSports	(United States) compLexity Gaming	(United States) Curse Academy	(United States) Aware Gaming

== 2013 - Fall Championship - Columbus ==
2013	Gold	Silver	Bronze	4th
Call of Duty: Ghosts 4v4	(United States) CompLexity	(United States) Team Kaliber	(United States) JusTus	(United States) UNiTE Gaming
Dota 2 5v5	Speed Gaming	(China) Team DK	(Ukraine) Na’Vi	(France) Sigma Balls

== 2014 - Anaheim ==
2014	Gold	Silver	Bronze	4th
Call of Duty: Ghosts 4v4	(United States) Evil Geniuses	(United States) OpTic Gaming	(United Kingdom) TCM Gaming	(United States) Curse Black
Call of Duty: Ghosts Season 3 Play In 4v4	(United States) OpTic Nation	(United States) Rise Nation	(United States) eLevate White	(United States) JusTus
StarCraft 2: Heart of the Swarm 1v1	(South Korea) IM Trap	(South Korea) CMStorm Polt	(South Korea) viOLet	(Canada) Acer Scarlett
Super Smash Bros. Melee 1v1	(United States) Cloud9|MaNg0	(Sweden) P4K.EMP|Armada	(United States) P4K.EMP|Mew2King	(United States) EG|PPMD
Super Smash Bros. Melee 2v2	(United States) (Sweden) Mew2King/Armada	(United States) Lucky/C9|MaNg0	(United States) Shroomed/S2J	(United States) ChuDat/Chillin
Injustice: Gods Among Us 1v1	(United States) FRQ.EMPR|Theo	(United States) GGA|16Bit	(United States) EMPR|WhiteBoi	(United States) C88|WoundCowboy
Killer Instinct 1v1	(United States) EG|JWong	(United States) C88|mygod	(United States) RG|Rico Suave	(United States) Hitbox|Tryant

== 2015 World Finals ==
The MLG 2015 World Finals took place in New Orleans, Louisiana, United States on October 16–18, 2015. The event featured five games, Call of Duty: Advanced Warfare, Dota 2, Smite, Super Smash Bros. Melee, and Super Smash Bros. for Wii U.

Notably, ZeRo's record-setting, 56-tournament winning streak was broken after he lost to Nairo.

2015	Gold	Silver	Bronze	4th
Call of Duty: Advanced Warfare	OpTic Gaming	Denial eSports	Team eLevate	Team EnVyUs
Dota 2	Team Secret	Evil Geniuses	(monkey) Business	CDEC Gaming
Smite	Team eLevate	Team Eager	Aware Gaming	Epsilon eSports
Super Smash Bros. Melee 1v1	(United States) Liquid|Hungrybox	(United States) COG|Mew2King	(United States) Tempo|Axe	(United States) COG|Wizzrobe
Super Smash Bros. Melee 2v2	(United States) Mew2King/Wizzrobe	(United States) Chillin/Axe	(United States) DruggedFox/Nintendude	(United States) TaylorHJ/Lee Martin
Super Smash Bros. for Wii U 1v1	(United States) Liquid|Nairo	(Chile) TSM|ZeRo	(United States) PG|ESAM	(Canada) Boreal|Ally
Super Smash Bros. for Wii U 2v2	(Chile) (United States) ZeRo/Nairo	(Canada) (United States) Ally/Trela	(United States) NAKAT/False	(Netherlands) (United States) Mr. R/StaticManny
