= Midas (gamer) =

South Korean esports competitor (born 1987)

midas
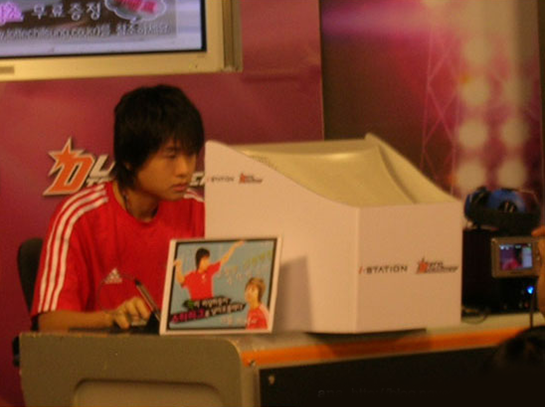

Personal information
- Name: Jeon Sang-wook
- Born: February 21, 1987 (age 39)
- Nationality: South Korean

Jeon Sang-wook (Korean: 전상욱; born February 21, 1987) is a professional StarCraft player from South Korea who plays Terran under the alias Midas or midas[gm].

== Career ==
In 2004, he won silver in StarCraft: Brood War at the World Cyber Games 2004, which was held in San Francisco, California, the first time that the finals were held outside of Korea since the competition's beginning in 2000. The professional gaming organization Team Liquid said that he was considered one of the strongest Terrans in history, who was accepted as the best in the world during his prime. His competition, in particular, against another South Korean player, Ma Jae-yoon alias sAviOr, also in his prime, in 2006, was notable. In January 2014, he returned to gaming, after a break for serving in the Republic of Korea Armed Forces, and was welcomed by excited fans in a finals in Seoul, with Lim "PianO" Jin-mook, who was also back from the military.

== Major achievements ==
- 2004 World Cyber Games 2004 - runner-up
- 2006 Pringles MSL Season 1 - 3rd
- 2006 Shinhan Bank Star League Season 2 - 3rd
