= Str8 Rippin =

Professional Halo esports team

- Divisions: Halo
- Founded: 2005
- Location: Florida, United States
- Website: https://str8rippin.com/

Str8 Rippin is a professional Halo team in the United States that competes in the Halo Championship Series. Str8 Rippin was first formed in 2005 for Halo 2 on the Major League Gaming (MLG) Pro Circuit. Their most successful period was during the MLG Halo 3 Pro Circuit, when they won several tournaments. Tom "Tsquared" Taylor was their longtime captain and was considered the face of the team for several years.

== History ==
=== 2005 ===
Str8 Rippin was founded as Not So Str8 Rippin for the 2005 MLG Pro Circuit. After the first event of the year, at 4th-place finish at MLG D.C. on January 29–30, the name was shortened. The initial roster of Str8 Rippin was Fonzi, SyNeRGy, SadPandaEh, Foulacy, and Hathrow. MLG San Francisco in February saw the debut of Ben "True Karma" Jackson, and the team finished 3rd. After San Francisco Str8 Rippin acquired future captain Tsquared. again finished 3rd at MLG Houston in March and MLG Orlando in April. In June, the team did not attend MLG St. Louis. Str8 Rippin's first win came at MLG Philadelphia in June, where they beat Team3D in the finals, the only time 3D was beaten that year. In July, the team became sponsored by TrademarkGamers and began playing under the name TmG. At MLG Vegas 2005 in August TmG finished 1st. The team took a two-month break and skipped attended MLG Nashville and MLG Seattle. At August's MLG Los Angeles, they finished 2nd at Team3D. After this event the team signed Matt "Zyos" Leto. TmG repeated the previous result at MLG Atlanta in September again losing to 3D in the finals. After this event, TrademarkGamers dropped the team and they resumed At MLG Chicago in December, Str8 Rippin placed 3rd. At the MLG New York national championships Str8 Rippin finished 3rd.

=== 2006 ===
Str8 Rippin was one of three teams to appear on every episode of MLG Pro Circuit, a weekly program on USA Network. Str8 Rippin finished 3rd at the national championships at MLG New York.

=== 2008 ===
Tsquared signed a three-year US$250,000 contract with MLG.

Str8 Rippin captain Tsquared appeared on 175 million of MLG-themed Dr. Pepper bottles in the United States.

Str8 Rippin qualified for the national championships at MLG Vegas on November 21–23.

=== 2010 ===
Str8 Rippin failed to qualify for the Reach national championships at MLG Dallas.

=== 2014 ===
Str8 Rippin competed in the Halo Master Chief Collection Esports tournament, the biggest tournament with Halo Master Chief Collection, and finished 2nd with a roster of Tsquared, Ryanoob, Lepar Messiah, and Str8 Sick.

=== 2015 ===
Str8 Rippin finished 6th in the inaugural Halo Championship Series (HCS) season. On April 3 Tsquared announced his retirement from competitive Halo.

=== 2016 ===
Str8 Rippin has recently returned to the competitive Halo scene, with a new roster of Heinz, A Pure Gangster, Ace, and Eco to represent the team in the fall season of the HCS Pro League.

=== 2017 ===
Str8 Rippin returned with a new roster consisting of Heinz, A Pure Gangster, Ace, and newest member Renegade to represent the team in the Halo World Championship 2017.
