= Team 3D (esports) =

Defunct American esports organization

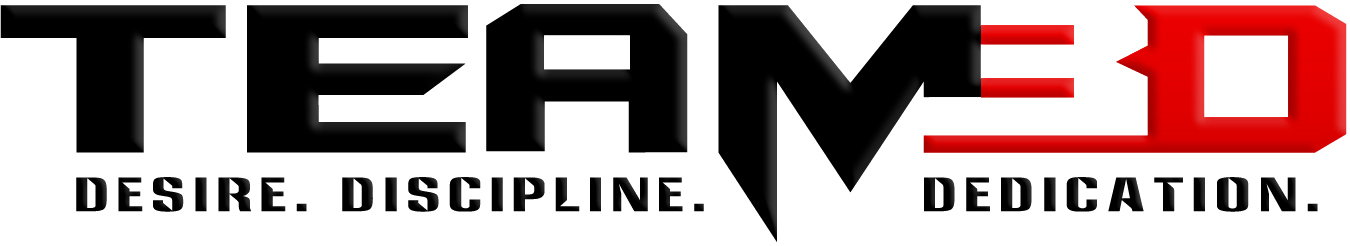
- Divisions: Counter-Strike: Source; Warcraft 3; Dead or Alive 4; Counter-Strike; Halo 2; Painkiller; Call of Duty
- Founded: 2002
- Folded: 2009
- Team history: Team 3D (2002–2007); 3D.NY (2007–2008); Team 3D (2008–2009)
- Based in: Dallas, Texas
- Location: United States
- Manager: Craig "Torbull" Levine
- Partners: Intel, SteelSeries
- Website: www.team3d.com

Team 3D was an American esports organization that formerly had teams competing in Counter-Strike: Source, Warcraft 3, Dead or Alive 4, Halo 2, Painkiller, and Call of Duty. Team 3D was one of the most successful North American Counter-Strike teams and briefly became a part of the Championship Gaming Series (CGS). The owner Craig "Torbull" Levine decided not to continue the team after the demise of the CGS in 2009.

== History ==
Team 3D was formed in 2002 by Craig "Torbull" Levine while a student at New York University in New York City, New York. In 2004 it became one of the first professional eSports teams in the world when it began paying its players. Team3D won Counter-Strike at World Cyber Games 2004.

Tylenol was a sponsor for Team 3D for a period during 2005. In 2005 3D won the WCG US finals in both CS and Halo 2, qualifying for the World Cyber Games 2005 grand finals.

Team 3D was a founding member of the G7 teams. For parts of 2005 and 2006 3D sponsored Halo 2 Major League Gaming Pro Circuit team Shoot to Kill. In April 2006 3D dropped its sponsorship of its Halo 2 team, and the team became known as Final Boss. In 2007 3D became an inaugural member of the Championship Gaming Series and became known as NY.3D.

In the first season of the CGS, NY.3D came in 4th place out of 16 teams.

After the demise of the Championship Gaming Series, Levine reacquired Team 3D but the team soon dissolved. 3D stands for Desire — Discipline — Dedication. Levine went on to co-found the ESEA League. Sponsors of the team at various points in time included Intel and SteelSeries.

== Notable achievements ==
Zonerank Standings
Current standing	Highest standing
11th	5th

Counter-Strike Tournaments
Year	Competition	Standings
2000	Cyberathlete Professional League	Third
2002	Cyberathlete Professional League	First
2003	Cyber X Games	First
2003	Cyberathlete Professional League	Third
2004	World Cyber Games	First
2005	World Cyber Games	First
2006	World Series of Video Games	Second
2006	Electronic Sports World Cup	Fourth

Warcraft III tournaments
Year	Competition	Standings
2006	World Series of Video Games	Fourth

Dead or Alive 4 tournaments
Year	Competition	Standings
2002	Cyberathlete Professional League	First

Call of Duty tournaments
Year	Competition	Standings
2004	Cyberathlete Professional League	Second
