= Final Boss (esports) =

Professional Halo esports team

TeamFinalBoss.com
- Divisions: Halo 2 Halo 3 Halo: Reach; Call of Duty
- Founded: 2005
- Folded: 2011
- Location: United States
- Partners: Complexity Gaming; Gilbert Arenas
- Website: www.teamfinalboss.com

Final Boss (known earlier as Shoot to Kill and Team 3D) was a professional esports team that competed in Halo competitions sponsored by Major League Gaming (MLG) and other tournaments. With its most successful lineups consisting of a core of Dan "Ogre 1" Ryan, Tom "Ogre 2" Ryan and Dave "Walshy" Walsh, Final Boss is regarded as one of the best Halo teams of all time due to their numerous tournament victories and MLG National Championships from 2004 to 2010. They also hold the record for the longest consecutive event winning streak, with 8 straight tournament victories from 2005 into 2006.

Former team members include Dave "Walshy" Walsh, Tom "OGRE 2" Ryan, Dan "OGRE 1" Ryan, Ryan "Saiyan" Danford, Michael "StrongSide" Cavanaugh and Justin "iGotUrPistola" Deese. NBA player Gilbert Arenas was once a sponsor of the team.

Final Boss was one of the professional teams that competed on the Boost Mobile Major League Gaming Pro Circuit that aired on USA Network in 2006. After several years of competing in Halo 3 and later Halo: Reach, Final Boss disbanded in 2011. In 2014, Ogre 2 revived the Shoot to Kill name for his Halo 2: Anniversary team, but the name was short-lived as the team was soon acquired by esports organization Counter Logic Gaming.

Ogre 2 has also fielded Final Boss teams in Call of Duty and Shadowrun MLG tournaments.

== History ==
=== Halo 2 ===
The original lineup of Final Boss was first formed as Shoot to Kill (StK) in 2005, at the beginning of the inaugural MLG Halo 2 season. With a roster of the Ogre twins Dan and Tom Ryan alongside Dave "Walshy" Walsh and Ryan "Saiyan" Danford, StK came in first at the five events it attended. The team then became sponsored by esports organization Team 3D and changed its name to Team 3D to reflect this. After their rebranding the team won five of the next six events.

In April 2006, Team 3D parted ways with the players and for the first time, the team took the name of Final Boss. They continued their four event winning streak into 2006, making it eight in a row before being dethroned by Carbon. The eight event streak stands as the longest winning streak in MLG history. Carbon defeated Final Boss in three straight events to close out the season, marking the first year the Ogre twins and Walshy had not won the MLG National Championship.

Final Boss made a team change for the 2007 season, dropping founding member Saiyan for Michael "StrongSide" Cavanaugh. The change proved to be fruitful, as Final Boss went on to win five of the seven tournaments in 2007, including the National Championships, to close out Halo 2 as the undisputed kings.

=== Halo 3 ===
Final Boss started Halo 3 out on a good note, winning the inaugural event of the 2008 season, but things went downhill from there. After finishing 7th and 5th in back to back events, the Ogres made the controversial decision to drop Walshy and pick up Mason "Neighbor" Cobb. After this move they improved, going on to place third in both Toronto and Dallas before finishing 4th at the National Championships.

2009 brought massive changes. Ogre 1 left the team, leaving Ogre 2 as the only remaining member of the original line up. The other team members were Justin "Fearitself" Kats, Joseph "Mackeo" Reinhart, and Cameron "Victory X" Thorlakson. This team would finish 5th in Meadowlands and 3rd in Columbus before Mackeo would be replaced by a returning StrongSide. This lineup finished 5th in Dallas. FearitSelf left the team and they picked up Dmitriy "Soviet" Gulyan, and went on to a 9th-place finish in Anaheim. They finished the year with Patrick "Sypher" Hynes in place of Soviet and an 8th-place finish at the Orlando National Championships.

To kick 2010 off, FearitSelf would rejoin Ogre 2 and Victory X, now accompanied by Anthony "Totz" Pennacchio, for a 3rd-place finish in Orlando. Following this, Totz was replaced with Halo 3 phenom Justin "iGotUrPistola" Deese, formerly of Triggers Down, leading to a 2nd-place finish in Columbus. The acquisition of Pistola would be the catalyst for a return to dominance for Final Boss, as the lineup went on to win the final 3 events of the year.

=== Halo: Reach ===
Despite keeping the same roster from the championship 2010 Halo 3 season, Final Boss only came in 10th place playing Halo: Reach at Dallas 2011, their lowest Final Boss had placed since its inception. CompLexity Gaming sponsored the team in 2011. Disappointed as their lack of success, two players departed, Pistola and Ogre 2, the last founding member. In their place came the return of Totz and newcomer Tyler "Ninja" Blevins. The new squad finished 5th in Columbus. The team then parted ways with Ninja and brought in Scottie "Cloud" Holste. This lineup finished 8th in Anaheim and again changed with Cloud and Totz, being replaced by Jordan "Amish Acorns" Dotzel and Jacob "Hysteria" Reiser. This team went on to place 10th in Raleigh. When Amish Acorns was swapped with Brian "Legit" Rizzo the team maintained the lineup for two events getting 10th in Orlando and 6th at the Providence National Championships.

=== 2014 temporary revival ===
In 2014 Ogre 2, Heinz, SnakeBite, and Royal2 created a team under the name Shoot to Kill. They placed third at their first tournament, the Master Chief Collection Launch Invitational on November 9. In November 2014 the team signed with Counter Logic Gaming, starting that organization's Halo division.

== Tournament placings ==
4v4 and 3v3 tournament placings, not including free-for-all (FFA) results of team members.

=== 2003 ===
Game	Date	Event	Location	Placing	Roster
Halo: Combat Evolved	April 12–13	Associates of Gaming Professionals (AGP) 2	Nashville, Tennessee	3–4th	BigSauce, Brese, Cyrax, Strangepurple
Halo: Combat Evolved	April 26–27	Halo 50k	New Jersey	3rd	Dom1nator, Ogre1, Ogre2, Strangepurple
Halo: Combat Evolved	August 2–3	Halo 50k2	Atlanta	1st	Ogre1, Ogre2, Strangepurple, Cyrax
Halo: Combat Evolved	October 26	MLG New York 2004	New York City, New York	2nd	Strangepurple, Brese, DrPoon, Pray4U
Halo: Combat Evolved	November 29–30	AGP 3	Nashville, Tennessee	1st	Ogre1, Ogre2, Clockwork, Strangepurple

=== 2004 ===
Game	Date	Event	Location	Placing	Roster
Halo: Combat Evolved	February 21–22	MLG Philadelphia	Philadelphia, Pennsylvania	1st	Ogre1, Ogre2, Clockwork, Strangepurple
Halo: Combat Evolved	April 17–18	MLG Dallas	Dallas, Texas	1st	Ogre1, Ogre2, Strangepurple
Halo: Combat Evolved	June 20	MLG Chicago 2004	Chicago, Illinois	1st	Strangepurple, Ogre1, Ogre2, Saiyan
Halo: Combat Evolved	July 25	MLG Atlanta 2004	Atlanta	2nd	Ogre1, Ogre2, Clockwork, Saiyan

=== 2005 ===
Game	Date	Event	Location	Placing	Roster
Halo 2	January 30	MLG Washington, D.C.	Washington, D.C.	1st	Ogre1, Ogre2, Saiyan, Walshy
Halo 2	February 27	MLG San Francisco 2005	San Francisco	1st	Ogre1, Ogre2, Saiyan, Walshy
Halo 2	March 6	AGP 7	Nashville, Tennessee	1st	Ogre1, Ogre2, Saiyan, Walshy
Halo 2	March 14	MLG Houston 2005	Houston	1st	Ogre1, Ogre2, Saiyan, Walshy
Halo 2	April 24	MLG Orlando 2005	Orlando	1st	Ogre1, Ogre2, Saiyan, Walshy
Halo 2	June 26	MLG St. Louis 2005	St. Louis, Missouri	1st	(as Team3D); Ogre1, Ogre2, Saiyan, Walshy
Halo 2	October 14–16	MLG Los Angeles	Los Angeles, California	1st	Ogre1, Ogre2, Saiyan, Walshy
Halo 2	November 27	MLG Atlanta	Atlanta	1st	Ogre1, Ogre2, Saiyan, Walshy
Halo 2	December 18	MLG Chicago 2005	Chicago	1st	Ogre1, Ogre2, Saiyan, Walshy
Halo 2	February 26, 2006	MLG New York 2005 Championships	New York	1st	Ogre1, Ogre2, Saiyan, Walshy

=== 2006 ===
Game	Date	Event	Location	Placing	Roster
Halo 2	April 21–23	MLG New York 2006 Opener	Secaucus, New Jersey	1st	Ogre1, Ogre2, Saiyan, Walshy
Halo 2	May 19–21	MLG Dallas	Dallas, Texas	1st	Ogre1, Ogre2, Saiyan, Walshy
Halo 2	June 25	MLG Anaheim	Anaheim, California	1st	Ogre1, Ogre2, Saiyan, Walshy
Halo 2	July 23	MLG Chicago	Chicago, Illinois	1st	Ogre1, Ogre2, Saiyan, Walshy
Halo 2	August 27	MLG Orlando	Orlando	2nd	Ogre1, Ogre2, Saiyan, Walshy
Halo 2	October 15	MLG New York Playoffs 2006	New York	2nd	Ogre1, Ogre2, Saiyan, Walshy
Halo 2	November 19	MLG Las Vegas 2006 Championships	Las Vegas	2nd	Ogre1, Ogre2, Saiyan, Walshy; Coach: OGRE3

=== 2007 ===
Game	Date	Event	Location	Placing	Roster
Halo 2	April 15	MLG Charlotte	Charlotte, North Carolina	1st	Ogre1, Ogre2, Walshy, StrongSide; Coach: ManTrain
Halo 2	June 8–10	MLG Meadowlands 2007	East Rutherford, New Jersey	1st	Ogre1, Ogre2, Walshy, StrongSide; Coach: ManTrain
Halo 2	July 22	MLG Dallas	Dallas, Texas	2nd	Ogre1, Ogre2, Walshy, StrongSide; Coach: ManTrain
Halo 2	August 19	MLG Chicago	Chicago	1st	Ogre1, Ogre2, Walshy, StrongSide; Coach: ManTrain
Halo 2	September 23	MLG Orlando	Orlando	2nd	Ogre1, Ogre2, Walshy, StrongSide; Coach: Tupac
Halo 2	October 14	MLG Las Vegas 2007 Championships	Las Vegas, Nevada	1st	Ogre1, Ogre2, Walshy, StrongSide
Halo 2	November 4	MLG Canada Open 2007	Toronto, Ontario; Direct Energy Centre	1st	Ogre1, Ogre2, Walshy, StrongSide

=== 2008 ===
Game	Date	Event	Location	Placing	Roster
Halo 3	April 13	MLG Meadowlands 2008	East Rutherford, New Jersey	1st	Ogre1, Ogre2, Walshy, StrongSide
Halo 3	June 15	MLG San Diego	San Diego, California	7th	Ogre1, Ogre2, Walshy, StrongSide
Halo 3	July 13	MLG Orlando	Orlando, Florida	5th	Ogre1, Ogre2, Walshy, StrongSide; Coach: ManTrain
Halo 3	August 24	MLG Toronto	Toronto, Ontario	3rd	Ogre1, Ogre2, StrongSide, Neighbor; Coach: Bravo
Halo 3	October 5	MLG Dallas	Dallas, Texas	3rd	Ogre1, Ogre2, StrongSide, Neighbor; Coach: Bravo
Halo 3	November 23	MLG Vegas	Las Vegas, Nevada	4th	Ogre1, Ogre2, StrongSide, Neighbor; Coach: Bravo
