= Major League Gaming =

Professional esports organization (2002–2024)

Major League Gaming Corp.
- Sport: Esports
- Founded: 2002; 24 years ago by Sundance DiGiovanni and Mike Sepso
- Folded: 15 January 2024; 2 years ago
- Owner: Activision Blizzard (2016–2024)
- CEO: Pete Vlastelica
- Commissioner: John Nelson
- Countries: United States; Canada
- Last champions: MLG New Orleans 2015; Call of Duty: Advanced Warfare: OpTic Gaming; Dota 2: Team Secret; Smite: Team eLevate; Super Smash Bros. Melee: Liquid|Hungrybox; Super Smash Bros. for Wii U: Liquid|Nairo
- Most titles: Team: Final Boss: 4 (2004–05, 07, 10); Individual: Tom Ryan: 35 (2005–12)

Major League Gaming Corp. (MLG) was a professional esports organization based in New York City. Founded in 2002 by Sundance DiGiovanni and Mike Sepso, MLG held official video game tournaments throughout the United States and Canada. The Boost Mobile MLG Pro Circuit was a television broadcast of Halo 2 MLG tournaments in 2006 and 2007, ESPN.com, and other broadband sites. The company was also involved in television production, and game development. MLG's aim was to elevate computer and console game tournaments to viable competitive and spectator events.

In January 2016, video game publisher Activision Blizzard announced its acquisition of Major League Gaming. The company, whose own esports division was led by MLG co-founder Mike Sepso, stated that it intended to leverage the purchase as part of its plans to build an esports-focused television network.

The organization experienced a loss of profit, leading its parent company, Activision Blizzard, to close its last branch in January 2024.

== Pro Circuit ==
The MLG Pro Circuit roster included Starcraft II and League of Legends for the PC. Mortal Kombat, Soul Calibur V, and King of Fighters XIII for the PlayStation 3, and Super Smash Bros. Melee for GameCube were the only console games. Fighting games were commented by Juicebox Abel, Tom Brady (not to be confused with the NFL quarterback), and Bibulus. No League of Legends casters have been announced.

Major League Gaming hosted a series of online qualifier ladders for the online-only pro circuit titles leading to the national championship. In the past, MLG hosted Super Smash Bros. Melee tournaments during the 2004 through 2006 MLG Circuit and other games such as Halo: Combat Evolved, Halo 2, Tekken 5, Gears of War, Tom Clancy's Rainbow Six: Vegas, Shadowrun, Tom Clancy's Rainbow Six: Vegas 2, Call of Duty 4, and Gears of War 2.

Each team/player was required to purchase a team pass to compete. These passes normally went on sale several weeks in advance of the next Pro Circuit event. Passes were limited, so participants were encouraged to purchase a pass as soon as they went on sale.

== Call of Duty Pro League ==
MLG Call of Duty Pro League
- Sport: Call of Duty
- First season: 2014 season 1
- Folded: 2015
- Replaced by: MLG Pro Circuit Call of Duty events
- No. of teams: 16
- Venues: Online (regular season); MLG Columbus Arena (playoffs)
- Continent: North America
- Last champions: FaZe Clan (Clayster, Enable, ZooMaa, Attach)
- Most titles: OpTic Gaming (3)
- Qualification: Online qualifiers
- Related competitions: Call of Duty World League

The MLG Pro League was a Call of Duty league that ran in 2014 and 2015 for Ghosts and Advanced Warfare respectively. There were three seasons per year, and 16 teams competing per season. The regular season was played online in a round-robin tournament format over the course of two months. At the end of each season, the bottom four teams were sent to a relegation tournament and the top eight teams were invited to an offline playoff tournament.

There was also a Dota 2 Pro League sponsored by joinDota.

Overview of Call of Duty winners
Season	Dates	Winner	Runner up
Ghosts Season 1	2014-02-17—2014-03-26	compLexity Gaming	Strictly Business
Ghosts Season 2*		Evil Geniuses	
Ghosts Season 3		Team EnVyUs	
Advanced Warfare Season 1		OpTic Gaming	
Advanced Warfare Season 2		OpTic Gaming	
Advanced Warfare Season 3		FaZe Clan	

*Held as MLG Anaheim 2014.

== History ==
Former logo, used until 2017

Major League Gaming was founded in 2002 by Sundance DiGiovanni and Mike Sepso. In 2006, MLG became the first televised video game console gaming league in the United States, with their Halo 2 Pro Series being broadcast by USA Network on Boost Mobile MLG Pro Circuit. It moved into the 3 Park Avenue sometime after its founding.

In February 2009, it was announced that MLG received $10 Million in financing from Ritchie Capital Management. On February 6, 2009, MLG Commissioner John Nelson addressed the MLG community about changing the format for the 2009 pro circuit. Semi-pro teams were given the opportunity to gain pro status. The rolling rank points system and the championship bracket were also modified. On August 18, 2009, Major League Gaming acquired Agora Games; CEO Matthew Bromberg explained that "we already operate the largest online competitive gaming property in the world. Agora is the leading developer of multi-player communities in the world. Coming together with Agora allows us to double-down on our biggest strength."

In March 2010, it was announced that fighting games would return to the pro circuit, with Tekken 6 exclusively on the PlayStation 3, and the return of the Smash Bros. competition with Super Smash Bros. Brawl. These two games appeared in the season opener in Orlando, along with the league's flagship, Halo 3, which entered its third season with the league.

Call of Duty: Modern Warfare 2 made its debut on the Online Pro Circuit on MLG's GameBattles website for PlayStation 3. Originally, the game was on both the Xbox 360 and PlayStation 3. Due to excessive hacking on the Xbox 360 console via JTAG hacks, it was stripped of its "Pro Circuit" branding. Prize payouts remained the same on both consoles. PlayStation 3 players became eligible to accumulate Pro Points. Those who had enough Pro Points at the end of the third season of the Online Pro Circuit became eligible to compete live at the MLG Nationals held in Dallas. Those competing on the Xbox 360 did not earn pro points and had championships held online. On July 30, 2010, it was announced that StarCraft II was to be added to the Pro Circuit. It made its official debut at MLG Raleigh.

The 2011 Circuit featured four titles: Halo: Reach, Starcraft 2, Call of Duty: Black Ops and the mid-season addition of League of Legends. Also returning, something that the MLG Pro Circuit hadn't seen since the 2005, was Pool Play. The top 16 teams were seeded in 4 pools of 5 teams, where the 5th team would play an undefeated amateur team. The team with the best record throughout pool play advanced to the winner's bracket semi-finals, securing themselves a Top 6 finish.

The 2012 MLG competitions saw many title changes in the Pro Circuit. Starcraft II was brought on as the league's main title. Fighting games for the PS3 and League of Legends were announced as additional titles. Halo: Reach is no longer on the Pro Circuit, nor is Call of Duty: Black Ops. Call of Duty was dropped from the circuit due to the lack of funding MLG received from PlayStation to put the title on the circuit. The 2012 tournament format has also drastically changed, with the introduction of seasonal events. The new format featured 4 quarterly seasons; within each season were 2 Arenas and a Championship. The Championship features all Pro Circuit titles, and has a free SD broadcast option. The Arenas were Pay-per-view (PPV) events, only featured Starcraft II, and were broadcast in high definition (HD) from MLG's Studio in New York.

Also in 2012 came many new partnerships for MLG. MLG partnered with CBS Interactive (CBSi) to increase its broadcast capabilities and to integrate with CBSi's website, GameSpot.com. This new partnership hoped to increase exposure of MLG to a larger more casual audience.

During 2012, MLG has also partnered with KeSPA (Korean Esports Association) in a multi-year agreement. This agreement allowed MLG exclusive access to KeSPA's Starcraft: Brood War players. The partnership saw KeSPA Brood War pros come to the US to compete in MLG events throughout the year. The participants were not allowed to compete at any other foreign tournaments without MLG's approval. The deal took effect in June, when KeSPA Brood War pros participated in an exhibition event at MLG Anaheim.

Beginning on November 2, 2012, with the commencement of the MLG Fall Championship in Dallas, Texas, Halo was reintroduced to the pro circuit. Halo 4, which was publicly released on November 6, was one of the five games scheduled for competitive play at MLG Dallas.

In January 2013, Call of Duty: Black Ops 2 was introduced into the Pro Circuit.

In 2013, MLG signed Carbon and Str8 Rippin to a collective $1.75 million contract.

On August 14, 2013, Call of Duty: Ghosts was announced to be MLG's featured first-person shooter game for the MLG Columbus and 2014 season events. Through June 8–10, 2014 MLG hosted a tournament at the X Games for Call of Duty: Ghosts with the eventual winners being OpTic Gaming including fan favorites Matt "Nadeshot" Haag and Seth "Scump" Abner.

In April 2014, MLG announced that it was partnering with Lai Fung Holdings Limited (Lai Fung) and eSun Holdings Limited in building the MLG Arena on Hengqin Island in China, near Macau. The arena, which was scheduled to be completed in 2017, was part of the "Creative Culture City" development planned on Hengqin.

In October 2014, MLG opened the 14,000 square feet (1,300 m^{2}) MLG.tv Arena in Columbus, Ohio . It is located near the Easton Town Center. The first event held at the arena was the Season 3 Call of Duty playoffs.

=== Acquisition by Activision Blizzard ===
On December 31, 2015, it was reported that "substantially all" of MLG's assets had been acquired by Activision Blizzard for $46 million, and that CEO Sundance DiGiovanni would be replaced by MLG's former CFO Greg Chisholm. Activision Blizzard operates its own in-house esports division, Activision Blizzard Media Networks, led by veteran sports television executive Steve Bornstein, MLG co-founder Mike Sepso, and its acquisition of assets from the defunct IGN Pro League. Activision Blizzard owns the Call of Duty and Starcraft franchises—which have been popular as esports. Reports indicated that MLG was to be shuttered, and that the majority of the purchase price would go towards paying off the company's debt.

Activision Blizzard confirmed the purchase on January 4, 2016. Activision CEO Bobby Kotick explained that the main target of the acquisition was MLG's streaming operation MLG.tv. Kotick explained to The New York Times that their eventual goal was to "build the ESPN of video games"—a television cable channel that would be devoted to esports coverage and analysis with "premium" in-house productions that could attract more major advertisers, either produced by Activision's staff or by outside producers. Despite the acquisition, MLG continued to host events relating to games that were not published by Activision Blizzard's subsidiaries.

In May 2016, MLG announced "Enhanced Viewing Experience", a new streaming player design that integrated live data and statistic displays.

MLG, which experienced a significant decline in viewership and profits during the COVID-19 pandemic, ultimately shut down. This closure was officially confirmed on January 15, 2024, with the announcement of the discontinuation of GameBattles, the last active branch of MLG.

== MLG.tv ==
MLG.tv was Major League Gaming's streaming media service. Several professional Call of Duty players including Matt "Nadeshot" Haag signed exclusive contracts with the streaming service. At the end of the first quarter of 2015, MLG announced that mlg.tv saw an increase in viewership by 253%.
