= Beyond the Game =

- Directed by: Jos de Putter
- Written by: Jos de Putter
- Produced by: Wink de Putter
- Starring: Li Xiaofeng; Fredrik Johansson; Manuel Schenkhuizen; Jang Jae Ho
- Cinematography: Vladas Naudzius; Richard van Oosterhout; Jackó van 't Hof
- Edited by: Sander Vos
- Music by: Paul van Brugge
- Release date: November 21, 2008 (International Documentary Film Festival)
- Running time: 75 minutes
- Country: The Netherlands
- Languages: Dutch, English, French, Spanish, Swedish, Mandarin & Korean

Beyond the Game is a 2008 Dutch documentary film about the world of professional video gaming, particularly of the game Warcraft III: The Frozen Throne featuring world champion players Chinese Xiaofeng "Sky" Li, Dutch Manuel "Grubby" Schenkhuizen and Swede Fredrik "MaDFroG" Johansson prominently. It is directed by award-winning Dutch documentary filmmaker Jos de Putter. Filming took place in China, France, The Netherlands, United States and Sweden. Languages spoken in the documentary include Dutch, English, French, Spanish, Swedish, Standard Chinese and Korean.

Beyond the Game is the motto of the World Cyber Games, which is central to the documentary as the main characters compete to defend or regain the event's championship title at the global finals of the 2007 World Cyber Games in Seattle, Washington.

It has premiered at the International Documentary Film Festival Amsterdam in Pathé de Munt, and had the cinema premiere in Pathé Tuschinski, and has now been released in cinemas throughout The Netherlands.

== Historical background ==
In 2002 the videogame Warcraft III: Reign of Chaos is released which sells millions of copies and quickly becomes a leading title in the world of competitive gaming. It was followed in 2003 by an expansion, Warcraft III: The Frozen Throne. A 17-year-old Swede by the name of Fredrik Johansson devotes himself to this new sport and rises to become the runner-up of the 2003 Electronic Sports World Cup and becomes widely regarded as the strongest non-Asian player. He is subsequently invited to become a full-time professional gamer in Seoul, South Korea where competitive gaming is an advanced subculture and many players make a living playing games. During his eleven-month stay there he wins the Blizzard Worldwide Invitational and is recognized as the world's most successful gamer. After his return to Sweden he becomes runner-up of the Electronic Sports World Cup 2004 again, but subsequently loses his motivation for the sport and qualifies for one more event in the 2004 World Cyber Games before retiring a few months later. There he is defeated prematurely and a new European star takes over from him as 16-year-old Manuel Schenkhuizen wins the event.

Dutchman Schenkhuizen was staying in Seoul at the time and a few months after the event he returns home and remains a dominating player. During this period his in-game race of choice, Orc, is considered disadvantaged in competition but he nevertheless is successful, winning the Electronic Sports World Cup 2005. He gains the nickname 'King of Orcs' in televised competition, similar to the nickname 'Terran Emperor' for twofold StarCraft world champion Lim Yo-Hwan (Boxer). He is considered a favorite to defend his World Cyber Games title at the 2005 global finals in Suntec City, Singapore and cement his name as the best player ever; but is defeated at the event by Dennis "Shortround-" Chan, a 22-year-old in college semi retired pro gamer.

Throughout the next year both players are frequent participants in the same international competitions. Schenkhuizen is successful enough to be honored as the Player of the Year in all of competitive gaming like Johansson two years before him. The award most important to both players however is that of World Cyber Games champion as the two qualify for the 2006 global finals in Monza, Italy and meet in the quarter-finals. Winning a second title would mean inclusion in the World Cyber Games Hall of Fame for either of them. This clash is observed by documentary filmmaker Jos de Putter who senses the deep emotions involved in the encounter, not only by the players but also by the spectators.

Afterwards the filmmaker decides to follow both players on their way to their next World Cyber Games encounter, where one player will try to defend and the other to regain the World Cyber Games title, and portray this new world. To provide insight in the background of the gaming scene and the mind of competitors he also contacts Fredrik Johansson who is developing a new life in Sweden and is now regarded as a legend in the world of competitive gaming.
