= World Cyber Games 2008 =

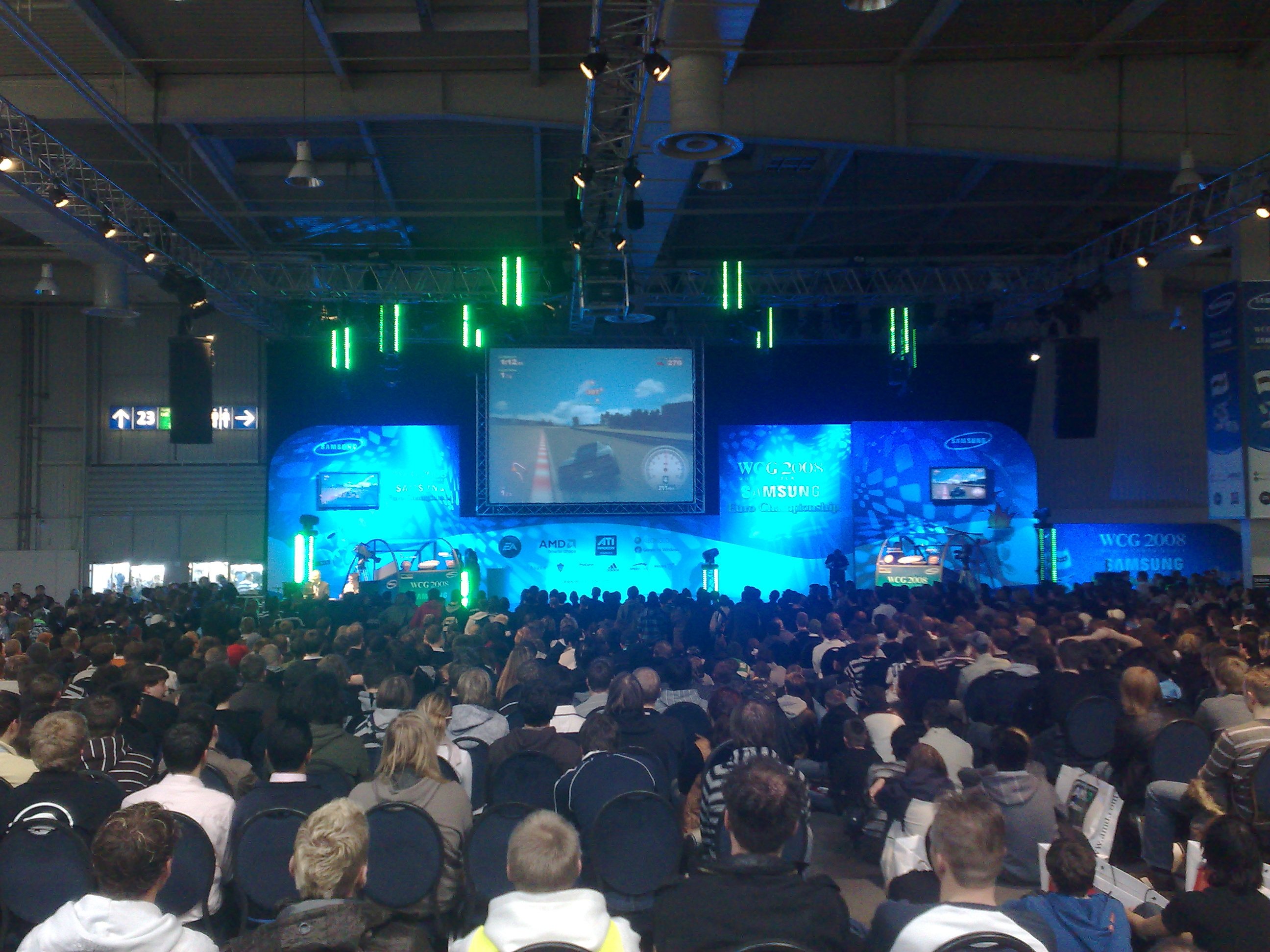
World Cyber Games 2008

The World Cyber Games 2008 was held in Cologne, Germany. It ran from 5 November 2008 through 9 November 2008 and was expected to feature 800 players from 78 countries.

== Official games ==
=== PC games ===
- Counter-Strike: 1.6
- StarCraft: Brood War
- Warcraft III: The Frozen Throne
- FIFA 08
- Need for Speed: ProStreet
- Command and Conquer 3: Kane's Wrath
- Age of Empires III: The Asian Dynasties
- Red Stone
- Carom3D

=== Xbox 360 games ===
- Project Gotham Racing 4
- Guitar Hero III
- Halo 3
- Virtua Fighter 5

=== Mobile game ===
- Asphalt 4

== Results ==
Event	Gold		Silver		Bronze	
Age of Empires III	(United States) Ryan Mancl (h2o_)		(South Korea) Byung-Geon Kang (iamgrunt)		(Germany) Max Laub (TheDemon)	
Asphalt 4	(Singapore) Jared Beins (Slyfoxlover)		(United States) Steven Anderson (Bluewolf)		(Germany) Andreas Rode (neogetix)	
Carom3D	(South Korea) Myeong-Jin Gu (KEnSin)		(Bulgaria) Iliyan Kiryakov (InmORtall)		(Brazil) Paulo Corgosinho (Guigo123)	
Command and Conquer 3	(Germany) Pascal Pfefferle (Dackel)		(Germany) Benjamin Schütz (Heckenheinrich)		(United States) David Lathrop (khufu_ownz)	
Counter-Strike	mTw.dk (Denmark)	Alexander Holdt (ave)	SK-Gaming (Sweden)	Jimmy Allen (allen)	eSTRO (South Korea)	Su-Young Jung (ari)
Counter-Strike	mTw.dk (Denmark)	Christoffer Sunde (Sunde)	SK-Gaming (Sweden)	Kristoffer Nordlund (Tentpole)	eSTRO (South Korea)	Jin-Hee Park (hee)
Counter-Strike	mTw.dk (Denmark)	Danny Sørensen (zonic)	SK-Gaming (Sweden)	Marcus Sundström (zet)	eSTRO (South Korea)	Sun-Ho Pyun (Termi)
Counter-Strike	mTw.dk (Denmark)	Muhamed Eid (mJe)	SK-Gaming (Sweden)	Robert Dahlström (RobbaN)	eSTRO (South Korea)	Sung-Jae Lee (bail)
Counter-Strike	mTw.dk (Denmark)	Jonas Svendsen (whiMp)	SK-Gaming (Sweden)	Dennis Wallenberg (walle)	eSTRO (South Korea)	Kun-Chul Kang (Solo)
FIFA 08	(Romania) Craciun Marius (nExt-BeBe)		(Portugal) Pedro Caiado (LastNightPT)		(Argentina) Juan Francisco Sotullo (Patan)	
Guitar Hero III	(United Kingdom) George Boothby (Monkey)		(Italy) Lorenzo Castelli (Lo7_)		(Sweden) Gustav Norman (Gugge2000)	
Halo 3	EndResult (Canada)	Kevin Thomas Garcia (DarkScorpion)	SSK. (France)	Maxime Rollan (AeteR)	Mob_Deep (United States)	Jordan Blackburn (LegendJRG)
Halo 3	EndResult (Canada)	Vanshaj "Max" Rawal (MadMax)	SSK. (France)	Steven Castaldi (lRazoR)	Mob_Deep (United States)	Ian Schult (Nai)
Halo 3	EndResult (Canada)	Christopher Kerluke (Lowkin)	SSK. (France)	Nicolas Taboureau (AzAfolK)	Mob_Deep (United States)	Leland Jones (Mimic)
Halo 3	EndResult (Canada)	Mark James (YungCity)	SSK. (France)	Quinzain Gregory (Ripper)	Mob_Deep (United States)	Joey Yamcharern (ScrubTwista)
Need for Speed: ProStreet	(Russia) Nikolay Frontov (USSRxMrRASER)		(Russia) Valery Nikolaev (USSRxProStreet)		(Netherlands) Steffan Amende (Steffan)	
Project Gotham Racing 4	(Netherlands) Wouter van Someren (Handewasser)		(United Kingdom) Ben Morris (Live)		(Austria) Stefan Koenigsmark (SteVeK)	
Red Stone	Comeonbaby (South Korea)	Ki-Pyo Kang	HappysweetsB (Japan)	Tomohiro Takami	HappysweetsA (Japan)	Hiroto Watanabe
Red Stone	Comeonbaby (South Korea)	Seung-Rywl Kim	HappysweetsB (Japan)	Shouta Ueda	HappysweetsA (Japan)	Kuniaki Kitagawa
Starcraft	(South Korea) Park Chan-Su (Luxury)		(South Korea) Song Byung-Gu (Stork)		(Ukraine) Ievgen Oparyshev (Strelok)	
Virtua Fighter 5	(Japan) Hiromiki Kumada (ITABASHI)		(Singapore) Danny Koo (Danny13)		(United States) Adnan Rana (adamYUKI)	
Warcraft 3	(Netherlands) Manuel Schenkhuizen (Grubby)		(South Korea) Jang Jae Ho (MYM]Moon)		(Russia) Dmitry Kostin (Happy)	
