= Team NoA =

Professional Counter-Strike esports team

- Divisions: Counter-Strike
- Founded: 2003
- Folded: 2007 (merged with mTw)
- Location: Denmark
- Website: Official website (Archived)

MTw, formerly known as Team NoA, was a professional Counter-Strike team. Founded by Jonas "bsl" Alsaker, the team was regarded as the world's best several times, taking home many prestigious "trophies" (or at least victories). They were the first professional e-sports team to consist of members from multiple continents when they formed the team from highly experienced players from Norway, Canada and United States. They were also the first e-sports team ever to pay for a player transfer out of a contract when they bought Ola "element" Moum out of his contract with SK Gaming.

In May 2005, elemeNt left Team NoA for the Brazilian team, MiBR. Team NoA was ready for World e-Sports Games season 2. Three days before the departure for Seoul, Korea, the team contacted Lars "Naikon" Olaisen who joined the team in Germany on very short notice.

In July 2005 the international Team NoA came to an end when it was announced that BrandTheGame would take over the management and method and Griffin "shaGuar" Benger left for Team 3D. The team would from then on be more localised. In late August a new Scandinavian team was announced along with new sponsorships and branding.

The CPL UK World Tour (Sept 2005) was the new NoA's first tournament, and they did very well by outplacing big names such as SK.swe, 4Kings and MiBR.

Shortly after CPL UK, Team NoA participated in the World e-sports Games qualifier in Stockholm. All the best teams from Europe was gathered and Team NoA qualified for the Korean Tournament. After World e-Sports Games season 3, the team had some internal problems after the five-week-long stay in Korea. All players except XeqtR were released and a new team was founded.

Team NoA showed up at shgOpen 2006, seeded as one of the favorites. Team NoA showed their future potential and won the tournament by beating the Swedish favorites, fnatic in the Grand Final.

Shortly after shgOpen the ownership became fully Danish, after Martin "guddo" Cording acquired the organization from BrandTheGame. A new generation was born, and the roster became 100% Danish.

In 2007 Team NoA merged with, and became the Danish Counter-Strike team in the mortal Team work (mTw) organization. mTw.dk dominated Counter-Strike in 2008, winning both KODE5 Global Finals, Intel Extreme Masters Continental Finals and the World Cyber Games 2008 among others. The Danes were awarded "eSports Team of the Year". The team was terminated in November 2011.

== History ==
=== 2003 ===
Founded on November 26, 2003, Team NoA combined members hailing from both Europe and North America into one of the first truly international professional eSports rosters.

The team initially set their goal of winning the CPL Winter 2003 event before forming the team, and with a month to prepare. The members temporarily relocated to California to practice at the Gamers-X LAN Center with Swedish team AdrenalineGX a few weeks prior to the tournament.

The team placed 2nd at CPL Winter 2003 losing to Team SK in the grand finals. Notable wins include a 13–5 victory over Team 64, a 13–2 victory over AdrenalineGX and a 13–2 victory over mouseports.

=== 2004 ===
Two months after acquiring Ola "elemeNt" Moum NoA traveled to Paris, France, for the 2004 Electronic Sports World Cup. After winning their initial group stage, the team entered the second group stage and lost to Virtus.pro and TSG. These relatively early losses resulted in a 9th-16th placing.

In contrast to the ESWC outcome, NoA moves on to go undefeated in Colorado Springs, Colorado at the EverLAN Summer 2004 event that was the precursor to CPL Summer 2004. After sweeping the group stage, NoA took the top seed heading into the quarter-finals. They had a narrow win over TEC that included one of the longest matches in Counter-Strike history after going into five overtimes. They went on to beat United 5 in the semi-finals before defeating Team EG 13-3 and 13–2 in the grand finals.

Two weeks after EverLAN, the team competed in Dallas, Texas for their second CPL attempt at CPL Summer 2004. They received the number two seed. Upon entering bracket play, NoA took a quick loss to their first opponent, TAU. A 13–11 win over Gamewyze followed by two wins over lesser known teams saw them face the west-coasts Team Rival. A loss in double overtime sent them home with 9th-12th.

One month later at OsloLAN 2004, NoA placed 2nd to spiXel. After an undefeated run in the upper bracket, NoA came up against spiXel who had been knocked down to the lower bracket in the 2nd round. The grand finals was over in two maps with a 16-13 and 16–8 defeat.

At this point, knoxville and Destructo went inactive. NoA picked up XeqtR and headed to Nollelva. They placed 4th overall, behind the Swedish teams spiXel, ICSU, and SK-Gaming.

Approaching the end of 2004, NoA made a third attempt at CPL with CPL Winter 2004. They received a number eight seed. A close win over MiBR in the second round of upper bracket play put them against the winners of CPL Summer 2004, EYEballers. Strong play in the opening half by NoA was reversed after a flash bug thrown by shaGuar gave the rounds following it to EYE. EYE took the advantage and knocked NoA down to the lower bracket. They made it to the grand finals after beating teams G3X, D!E, compLexity, Begrip, GamerCo. They became the first team ever to win a CPL after coming from the lower bracket by beating EYE two maps in a row.

=== 2005 ===
In February 2005 NoA traveled to Korea for the inaugural season of the World e-Sports Games or WEG, an 8-team invite only tournament. NoA won a best of three grand finals against 4kings, coming back after losing the first map.

Following the Korean success, MiBR bought out elemeNt's contract and NiP's reserve roster member fisker came in to replace him. However, only days before the start of WEG Season 2 fisker dropped out and was hastily replaced by quick. The second season of WEG was fruitless as the team lost twice in group play and was sent home.

Once home, shaGuar and method both received offers from Team 3D which they took. This left NoA with a one-man roster of XeqtR, following Naikon's inactive status because of schooling.

In August 2005, a new lineup was announced consisting of new members DarK, Red, speedi, and KixeR. A week later the team competed at CPL UK 2005. With the ninth seed they ended up finishing fourth overall.

October saw NoA sent to Korea for a third time after placing 2nd at the qualifiers behind Wings. Once in Seoul, the team was removed from play in the 2nd round of group play after loses to wNv.cn and Project_Kr with a final placing of 5th-8th. The three swedes on the roster left following the result, forcing the team to reform once again.

=== 2006 ===
On January 4 of 2006, DarK was released from the roster. NoA refreshed its roster with four new members this time around. Picking up Norwegians prb and xione, along with Danish players zonic and, the first of many Danes to join. The new roster got a test run at the shgOpen 2006 after a week of preparation. The team took 1st place after defeating fnatic in the finals.

Following success at SHG, once again NoA flew to Seoul, Korea to attend the WEG Season Four tournament. Losing all three of their first three matches, the team was hastily dispatched and loyal to history, again made roster changes upon returning home.

This time Norwegian xione was out, in his place XeqtR brought in the Danish player Paddy. The summer saw team leader XeqtR retiring from competitive gaming and leaving his roster without a Norwegian member for the first time in the history of the organization. Also leaving the roster, Preben "prb" Gammelsæter.

To help fill the void, NoA brought in mJe and FaagaN. Later that year, FaagaN went inactive and ave was added.

Competing at the WCG 2006 Finals with the new lineup, NoA took home 4th place.

=== 2007 ===
This gave NoA an entirely Danish membership. The new squad took top placings at Clanbase Eurocup XIII, and a third-place finish at SHGOpen2007.

Paddy left the team in May 2007 to "pursue new goals". His replacement was Sunde, a Danish player formerly of Spirit of Amiga. The new rosters first tournament was ESWC 2007.

At ESWC, the first group stage was nearly perfect. However, a loss to wNv.cn marred the record. Moving on undefeated in the 2nd group stage, they beat teams NiP, Dignitas, and Emulate on their way to the quarter-finals. Once there, NoA faced MiBR. The first map of the best of three series went to NoA in triple overtime. On the next map, they once again won with a narrow victory of 16–14, placing them in the grand finals opposite of Pentagram. In a match that saw the crowd becoming very vocal, Pentagram took the first map 16–5. The second map went into two overtimes, with NoA taking the win 22–18. On the third and final map, NoA lost 9-16 and finished out 2nd. July 2007 brought the World Cyber Games 2007 Grand Championship, and another second-place finish for the team.

== Teams ==
=== 4th generation ===
- Jørgen "XeqtR" Johannessen
- Preben "prb" Gammelsæter
- Lasse "xione" Stokke
- Danny "zonic" Sørensen
- Brian "hpx" Christensen

=== 2nd generation ===
- Ola "elemeNt" Moum
- Lars "Naikon" Olaisen
- Jørgen "XeqtR" Johannessen
- Griffin "shaGuar" Benger
- Michael "method" So

=== 1st generation ===
- Jonas "bsl" Alsaker Vikan
- Lars "Naikon" Olaisen
- Hallvar "knoxville" Dehli
- Griffin "shaGuar" Benger
- Michael "method" So

== Players ==
=== Latest roster ===
- Muhamed "mJe" Eid
- Danny "zonic" Sørensen
- Christoffer "Sunde" Sunde
- Brian "hpx" Christensen
- Alexander "ave" Holdt

=== Other players ===
- David "bATRA" Hage (4th generation)
- Devon "Destructo" Domercq (2nd generation)
- Dustin "kudos" Haney (5th generation)
- Lukas "linden" Lindhardt (5th generation)

== Championship results ==
- 1st at Cyberathlete Professional League Winter 2004
- 1st at World eSport Games 2005
- 2nd at SHG Open 2006
- 2nd at Cyberathlete Professional League Winter 2003
- 2nd at Electronic Sports World Cup 2007
- 2nd at World Cyber Games 2007
- 3rd at Intel Extreme Masters Season I 2007
- 1st at Intel Extreme Masters Season II (2008)
- 1st at World Cyber Games 2008

== Notable sponsors ==
AMD, ATI, ABIT, Kingston HyperX, SteelSeries, Shuttle Inc., Pepsi, and Sennheiser.
