= Stork (gamer) =

South Korean pro gamer (born 1988)

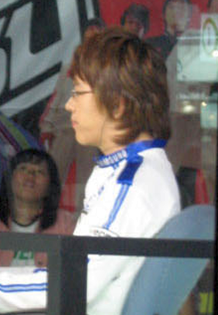

Personal information
- Name: Song Byung-gu
- Born: 4 August 1988 (age 38)
- Nationality: Republic of Korea

Career information
- Game: StarCraft
- Playing career: 2004–present
- Role: Protoss

Team history
- 2004–2013: Samsung KHAN
- 2013–2016: Samsung Galaxy

Career highlights and awards
- WCG champion (2007)

Korean name
- Hangul: 송병구
- Hanja: 宋炳具
- RR: Song Byeonggu
- MR: Song Pyŏnggu

Song Byung-gu (born 4 August 1988) is a South Korean professional StarCraft Protoss player from Pohang who plays under the alias Stork[gm] or simply Stork.

== Individual ==
- 3rd 2007 Daum Starleague: 3rd
- GomTV MSL: 2nd
- 1st World Cyber Games 2007 Grand Final
- 2nd 2008 EVER OnGameNet Starleague
- 2nd 2008 Bacchus OnGameNet Starleague 2nd
- 1st WWI 2008
- 1st 2008 Incruit Starleague
- 2nd World Cyber Games 2008 Grand Final
- 2nd World Cyber Games 2009 Grand Final
- 1st IEF 2009
- 2nd 2010 Bacchus OnGameNet Starleague

== Samsung KHAN ==
- Shinhan bank Proleague 2007: 1st
- Shinhan bank Proleague 2007: MVP
- Shinhan bank Proleague 2007 Final: MVP

== KESPA awards ==
- 2005: Rookie of the Year
- 2007: Best Player – Protoss

== OSL/MSL/WCG career statistics ==
=== 2008-2009 season ===
League	Name of Tournament	Result	Qualification
WCG	2009 Grand Final	Silver	
OSL	EVER 2009	Round of 16	TBA
MSL	Avalon Online	Round of 32	
OSL	Bacchus 2009	Round of 16	EVER 2009
MSL	Lost Saga	Semifinal	Avalon
OSL	Batoo	Quarterfinal	Bacchus 2009

=== 2008–2009 season ===
League	Name of Tournament	Result	Qualification
WCG	2008 Grand Final	Silver	
OSL	Incruit	Winner	Batoo
MSL	Clubday Online	Quarterfinal	Lost Saga
OSL	EVER 2008	Round of 16	Incruit
OSL	Bacchus 2008	Runner-up	EVER 2008

=== 2004–2008 season ===
League	Name of Tournament	Result	Qualification
MSL	GomTV S3	Round of 16	
OSL	EVER 2007	Runner-up	Bacchus 2008
WCG	2007 Grand Final	Gold	
MSL	GomTV S2	Runner-up	GomTV S3
OSL	Daum	Third place	EVER 2007
OSL	Shinhan Bank 2006 S1	Round of 16	
MSL	Pringles S1	Round of 16	
OSL	Shinhan Bank 2005	Round of 16	
OSL	So1	Round of 16	
OSL	EVER 2005	Round of 16	

== See also ==
- StarCraft professional competition
- Samsung Khan
- Starleague
- MSL
- Electronic sports
