= Seo Ji-soo =

South Korean electronic sports player (born 1985)

ToSsGirL

Personal information
- Name: Seo Ji-soo
- Nickname: Queen of Terran
- Born: 21 May 1985 (age 41)
- Nationality: South Korean

Career information
- Games: StarCraft
- Playing career: 2001–2012

Korean name
- Hangul: 서지수
- Hanja: 徐智秀
- RR: Seo Jisu
- MR: Sŏ Chisu

Seo Ji-soo (Korean: 서지수; born 21 May 1985) is a professional StarCraft player from South Korea who played under the alias ToSsGirL (Terran, STX Soul) and referred to as the "Queen of Terran". On, 17 July 2012, Seo Ji-soo officially retired from pro gaming and she is now running a cybermall called 'tossgirl'.

== StarCraft career ==
Tossgirl was first introduced to StarCraft by her father in 1999, and she and her sister Seo Ji Seung "ZergGirl" both started to play avidly. Her continued practise has been attributed to her wanting to compete and win against her sister, and after accomplishing this, Tossgirl switched races from Protoss to Terran.

She continued to play StarCraft and was fascinated by the professional tournaments on television. At 16, after seeing BoxeR play on television, she decided that she wanted to become a professional gamer. When she told her father, he said that he wished he had never introduced her to StarCraft. However, she continued to play and would sneak out at night to play in local tournaments around Seoul.

In 2001 at age 17, ToSsGirl qualified for the female WCG tournament and showed good standings in preliminary rounds of other tournaments. The next year, ToSsgirl got into her first major competition which was hosted by Ghem TV. She was able to get into the top 8 twice and by doing so she became qualified to receive her professional gaming license. From there, she was picked up by the STX Soul professional gaming team where she has remained since.

In 2003, she was able to win the gameTV female league and also made headlines by beating FreeMura, the first OSL winner, in minorleague (he then retired). She subsequently won the gameTV female league in 2004 and in 2005. In 2005, Tossgirl also beat [NC]YellOw in the WCG preliminary round. At this time, [NC]YellOw was considered one of the top professional gamers.

After the disappearance of female leagues in late 2005, Tossgirl has continued to play in regular tournaments with limited success. Her most prominent victories in recent years have been beating Modern 2–0 in the GomTv Classic, the first match win by a female in a KESPA sanctioned tournament along with a few more matches and in 2009 she was able to beat Max in the MSL Preliminary round.

In 2009, she played in e-Stars Seoul StarCraft Heritage League 2009. After a dramatic loss in first game against YellOw, she defeated Reach in her second game, which was a substantial upset. In the 2010 Spring OSL preliminaries, ToSsGirL beat GoRush, one of the top players from 2001 to 2004. However, she later lost to Stats in the preliminaries.

In 2010, Ji-soo won the champion of STX in China by beating Sun "F91" Yifeng with 2–1.

Ji-soo was considered one of the 15 highest paid female professional video gamers in the world.

She retired in July 2012.

== Tournament results ==
- 1st place in Game TV Female League 4
- 1st place in Game TV Female League 3
- 1st place in Game TV Female League 2
- 1st place in TV Stargirls League 2
- 1st place in OGN Female Gamer Exhibition Tournament
- 3rd place in Electronic Sports World Cup Masters of Cheonan (2009)
