= Lauke =

Lauke is a surname. Notable people with the surname include:

- Gerhard Lauke (born 1952), German cyclist

== See also ==
- Hauke
- Laurens Pluijmaekers (born 1984), Dutch competitive gamer; nicknamed "Lauke"
- Luke (name)
- Michael Laucke (born 1947), Canadian guitarist and composer
