= Musa Çelik =

German professional footballer

Musa Celik
Personal information
- Date of birth: 11 April 1983 (age 43)
- Place of birth: Oberhausen, West Germany
- Height: 1.70 m (5 ft 7 in)
- Position: Striker

Team information
- Current team: BV Osterfeld 1919

Youth career
- –2002: Arminia Klosterhardt
- 2002–2005: Rot-Weiß Oberhausen
- 2000–2005: SSVg Velbert

Senior career*
| Years | Team | Apps | (Gls) |
| 2006–2009 | Rot-Weiß Oberhausen | 15 | (1) |
| 2009 | Giresunspor | | |
| 2010–2011 | Rot-Weiß Oberhausen II | | |
| 2010–2011 | Rot-Weiß Oberhausen | 19 | (1) |
| 2011–2014 | KFC Uerdingen 05 | 81 | (5) |
| 2014–2017 | FSV Duisburg | 45 | (1) |
| 2017–2019 | SV Genc Osman | 24 | (0) |
| 2020– | BV Osterfeld 1919 | 2 | (1) |

Managerial career
- 2017: SV Genc Osman (player-assistant)
- 2017–2019: SV Genc Osman (player-coach)
- * Club domestic league appearances and goals as of 23:13, 13 May 2020 (UTC)

Musa Celik (born 11 April 1983) is a German professional footballer who plays for BV Osterfeld 1919 and is co-founder of the SK Gaming esports clan.

== Career ==
Born in Oberhausen, Celik began his career in the 2006–07 season at Rot-Weiß Oberhausen, playing for the reserve team initially. In his next season, Musa played in 10 games and helped promote RWO to the 2. Bundesliga. He moved in June 2009 to Giresunspor. After a half year at Giresunspor he returned on 29 December 2009 to sign for his youth club Rot-Weiß Oberhausen where he played for the reserve in the Landesliga.

Celik appeared on the bench for Oberhausen's first match of the 2010–11 2. Bundesliga season against Hertha BSC.

On 14 April 2017, it was confirmed that Celik would join SV Genc Osman for the upcoming season as an assistant coach, but would also be registered to play games for the team. Later in the same year, he was promoted to head coach. He resigned on 26 May 2019.

Beside his job as a school teacher, he joined BV Osterfeld 1919 in the winter 2020.

== Esports career ==
Celik is also notable as an esports pioneer. In 1997, he was one of the first players of the SK Gaming esports clan (named "Schroet Kommando" back then), founded by his close friends and brothers Ralf Reichert, Tim Reichert and Benjamin Reichert. Among gamers, Celik was known as SK|kila.
