= Jos de Putter =

Dutch film director, film critic and screenwriter

- Born: Terneuzen, Netherlands
- Occupation: Film director

Jos de Putter (Terneuzen, 1959) is a Dutch film director, film critic and screenwriter who primarily makes Dutch documentary films. He studied political science and literature at the University of Leiden, and was a member of the editorial staff of the film magazine Skrien. He has also worked on a number of Dutch television programs and works as a creative producer for documentary production company Dieptescherpte BV. As a visual artist de Putter was commissioned to make the installation’Earth’ against the back wall inside the new Dutch parliament in 2021.

His documentaries have been shown and awarded at many film festivals. His debut film, Het is een schone dag geweest (It's been a lovely day'), about the last year of work at his parents' farm was hailed internationally as "documentary in the purest form" and won the City of Utrecht Film Prize at the Dutch Film Festival. This documentary has been included in the Dutch Film Canon (list of 16 best Dutch films ever). He won the prestigious Joris Ivens Prize at the IDFA for Solo, de wet van de favela and 7 internationals festivals with his portrait of a Chechen children's dance troupe: Dans, Grozny dans (2002). The Chicago International Documentary Film Festival, the Brooklyn Academy of Music, The National Arts Museum Washington and the Pacific Film Archive featured a retrospective tribute to De Putter’s work in 2005. The Festival dei Popoli in Florence featured a retrospective tribute in 2014.

De Putter ‘discovered’ the Brazilian footballer Leonardo Vitor Santiago, whom he cast as the star of Solo, de wet van de favela at the age of 11. Twenty years later (2014), the two look back on life and film, de Putter's sequel documentary in Solo; Out of a Dream.

He wrote and directed Beyond the Game, How Many Roads (2005), and See No Evil (2014). His documentary on Alexander Litvinenko (2017) was sold worldwide.

De Putter made video-installations for various museums, including 'Zeeuwse Klei' and 'Landscapes' for Zeeuws Museum Middelburg (2013 and 2017). This work led to the invitation to create the back wall inside the new Dutch parliament, in 2021.

From 2007-2013 De Putter was editor in chief of renowned VPRO documentary program 'Backlight'.

As of 2013 De Putter is commissioning editor of 'webdocumentaries' for Dutch news site De Correspondent and as of 2018 for Human/NPO. Short docs won the Locarno Filmfestival (2014) and the European Film Award (2016).

In 2014 his film See No Evil won the VIKTORIA DOK.international – International Competition at the Munich International Documentary Film Festival.
