= CarlJr. =

Canadian professional Trackmania player (born 1996)

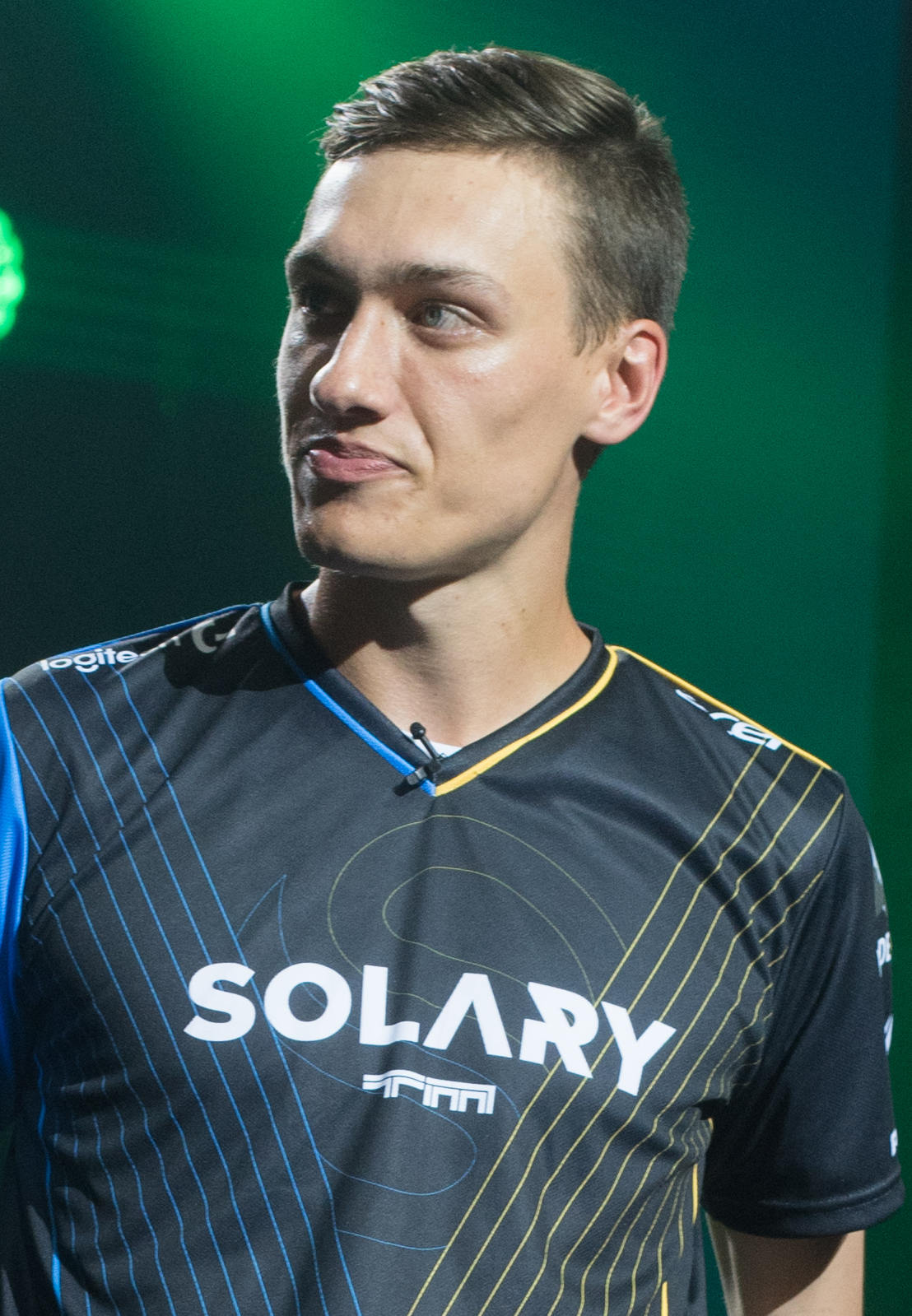
- Cloutier in 2019

Current team
- Team: Team Falcons
- Games: TrackMania^{2}: Stadium; Trackmania

Personal information
- Born: Carl-Antoni Cloutier; December 17, 1996 (age 29); Rosemère, Quebec, Canada

Career information
- Playing career: 2010–present

Team history
- 2010–2011: MythiX eSport
- 2010–2016: Dignitas
- 2016–2018: Team expert.Black
- 2018–2019: Team Zerator
- 2019–2026: Solary
- 2026–present: Team Falcons

Career highlights and awards
- 7× World champion; 3× ESWC champion (2013, 2014, 2015); 4× TMGL:WC champion (2021, 2022, 2024, 2025); 5× ZrT Cup champion (2015, 2015, 2017, 2018, 2019)

Carl-Antoni Cloutier (born December 17, 1996), better known as CarlJr., is a Canadian professional TrackMania player who plays for Team Falcons. He is the most successful player in the game's history, winning seven total world championships, three at the Electronic Sports World Cup and four at the Trackmania Grand League World Cup. He has also won the ZrT TrackMania Cup five times. He is widely considered to be the best TrackMania player of all time.

== Early life ==
Carl-Antoni Cloutier was born on December 17, 1996, in Rosemère, Quebec.

== Career ==
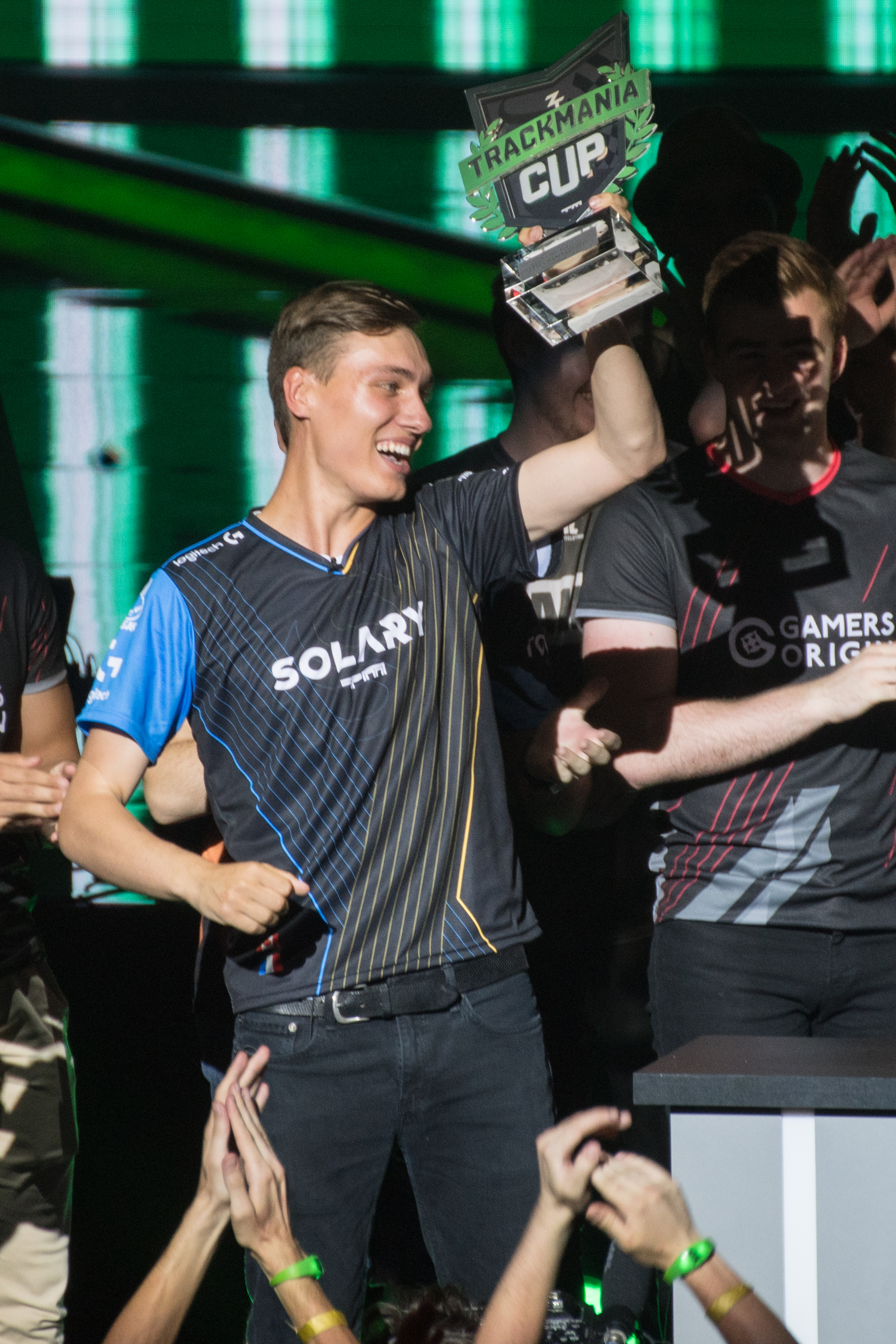
Cloutier lifting the trophy for ZrT TrackMania Cup 2019

Cloutier's first major placement was in the 2012 Electronic Sports World Cup, placing third in the TrackMania Nations Forever event. In the first ZrT TrackMania Cup, organized by Zerator in October 2013, he reached the semifinals. Later that month, he won the 2013 Electronic Sports World Cup, his first world championship victory, following it up with wins in the 2014 and 2015 editions. He also won the second and third editions of the ZrT TrackMania Cup in March and December 2015, respectively. In the fourth cup in 2016, he lost in the last round to JaviFlyer but won again in ZrT TrackMania Cup 2017 and ZrT TrackMania Cup 2018. In a duo with Bren, he also won the ZrT TrackMania Cup 2019, but in the ZrT TrackMania Cup 2020, he lost to Gwen. He received his fourth, fifth, and sixth world championship titles at the Trackmania Grand League World Cup: 2020-2021, the Trackmania Grand League World Cup 2022, and the Trackmania World Cup 2024, respectively. In 2023, he finished in second place. In 2025, Cloutier won Red Bull Faster, and achieved his seventh career world championship title at the Trackmania World Cup 2025.
