= MC (gamer) =

South Korean electronic sports player (born 1991)

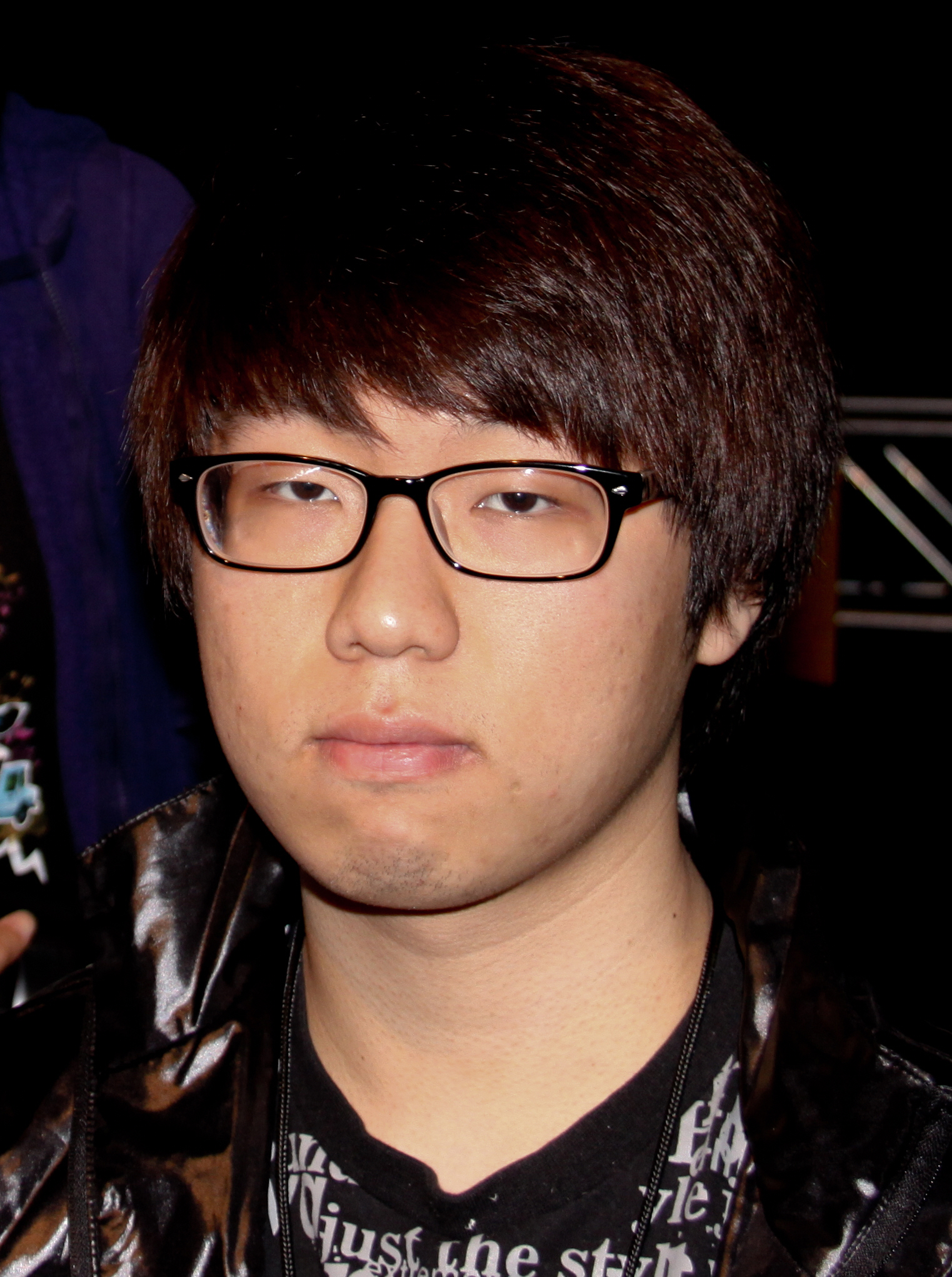
- Jang in 2011

Personal information
- Name: 장민철 (Jang Min-chul)
- Born: June 17, 1991 (age 35)
- Nationality: South Korean

Career information
- Games: StarCraft; StarCraft II
- Playing career: 2010–2015

Team history
- 2010: MBCGame HERO
- 2010–2012: Old Generations
- 2011–2013: SK Gaming

Jang Min-chul (장민철, born June 17, 1991), better known as MC or The BossToss, is a former Korean professional StarCraft II player, playing as the Protoss faction. MC has accumulated more than $500,000 in tournament winnings, and won the Global StarCraft II League (GSL) championship twice. In 2014, Red Bull Esports called him "one of the most successful StarCraft 2 players ever".

== Starcraft II Career ==
=== Old generations (2010-2012) ===
He has won the Intel Extreme Masters Season VI World Championship (6–10 March 2012) by defeating PuMa 3–2 in the finals, GOMTV Global StarCraft II League (GSL) twice, and as of 2012 is considered one of the top StarCraft II players in the world. He has experienced similar success in Europe, winning 2011 DreamHack Stockholm Invitational and Copenhagen Games Spring 2011, while taking silver in IEM Season VI - Global Challenge Cologne.

=== SK Gaming (2012-2013) ===
In July 2011, Min Chul who was playing for the Korean team Old Generations (oGs), began representing SK Gaming in foreign events. In January 2012, this partnership ended with Min Chul leaving Old Generations and moving to play for SK Gaming full-time. He would remain with SK until the end of 2013, when the organization announced his departure.

=== Free agent (2014-present) ===
Following his departure from SK Gaming at the end of 2013, MC announced that he would continue to work with his former manager at SK Gaming, but would not join a new professional team.

On June 18, 2015, MC announced his retirement via Twitter.

== League of Legends career ==
On November 2, 2016, it was announced that MC would coach Kongdoo's League of Legends team.
