= Tim Reichert =

German esports pioneer and footballer (born 1979)

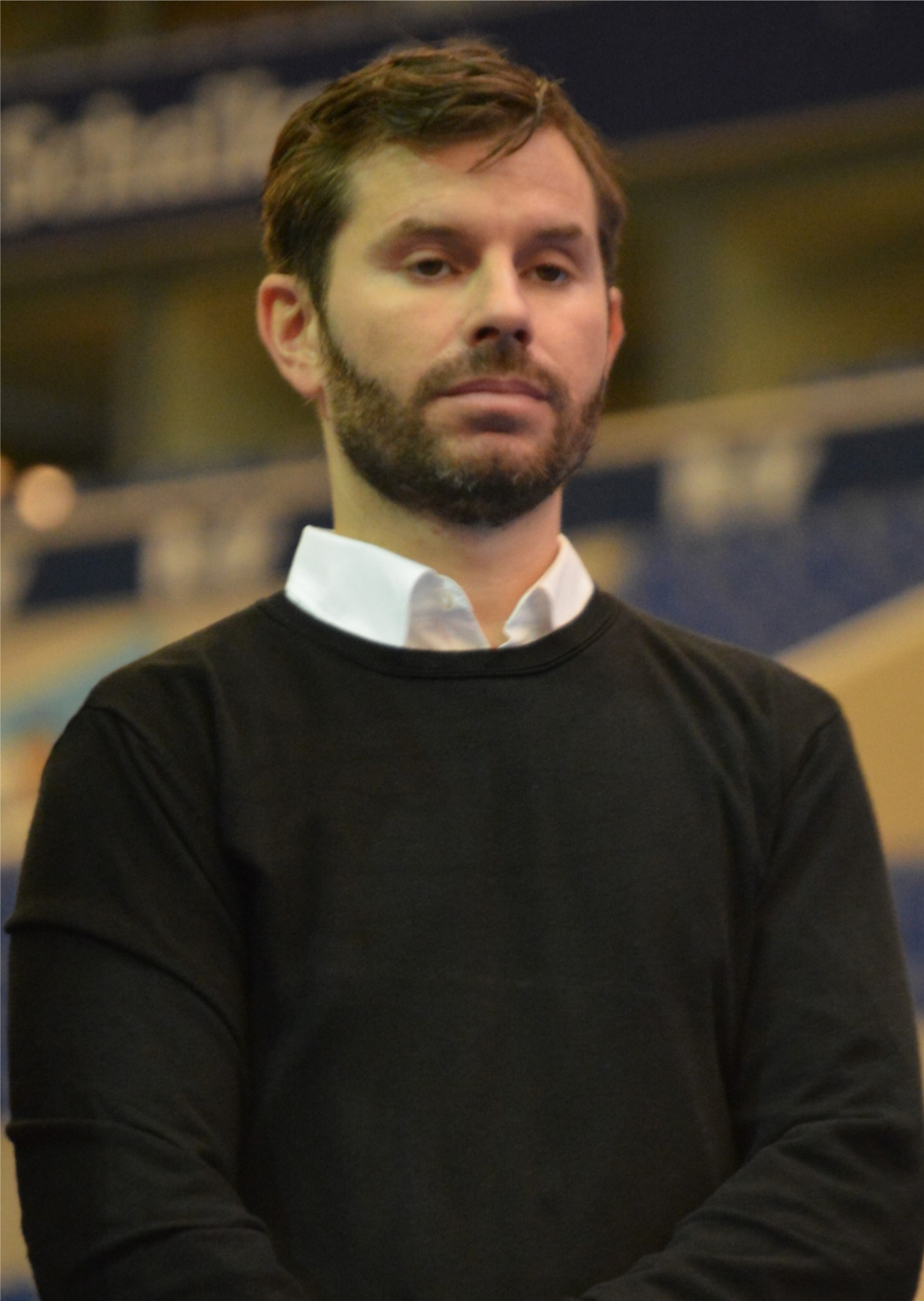

Personal information
- Date of birth: 9 October 1979 (age 47)
- Place of birth: Essen, West Germany
- Height: 1.78 m (5 ft 10 in)
- Position: Midfielder

Youth career
- Arminia Klosterhardt
- Adler Osterfeld

Senior career*
Years	Team	Apps	(Gls)
1999–2000	Adler Osterfeld		
2000–2003	Rot-Weiß Oberhausen II		
2003–2005	Rot-Weiß Oberhausen		
2005–2006	SSVg Velbert		
2006–2009	Rot-Weiß Oberhausen	62	(1)
2011–2013	VfR 08 Oberhausen		
2013–2014	SV Adler Osterfeld		
2014	SV Uedesheim		
- * Club domestic league appearances and goals

Tim Reichert (born 9 October 1979) is a German esports pioneer and former professional footballer. He was co-founder of the esports team SK Gaming and is the head of Schalke 04's esports division.

== Football career ==
Tim Reichert was born in Essen, North Rhine-Westphalia. He was signed by Rot-Weiß Oberhausen in the 2003–04 season, but was initially used in the reserve teams only. After being loaned to SSVg Velbert (2005–06), he returned to Oberhausen and played 13 matches in the 2007–08 season for Rot-Weiß. He left then on 2 June 2009 to sign with Sportfreunde Siegen.

== Esports career ==
Reichert is also notable as an esports pioneer. In 1997, he founded the clan SK Gaming (named "Schroet Kommando" back then) with his brothers Ralf and Benjamin Reichert and several other gamers, among them Musa Celik. Both Benjamin Reichert and Musa Celik also played professional soccer for Rot-Weiß Oberhausen. In 2016, Reichert was named Head of ESport at Schalke 04 which had entered competitive esports.
