= Benjamin Reichert =

German footballer (born 1983)

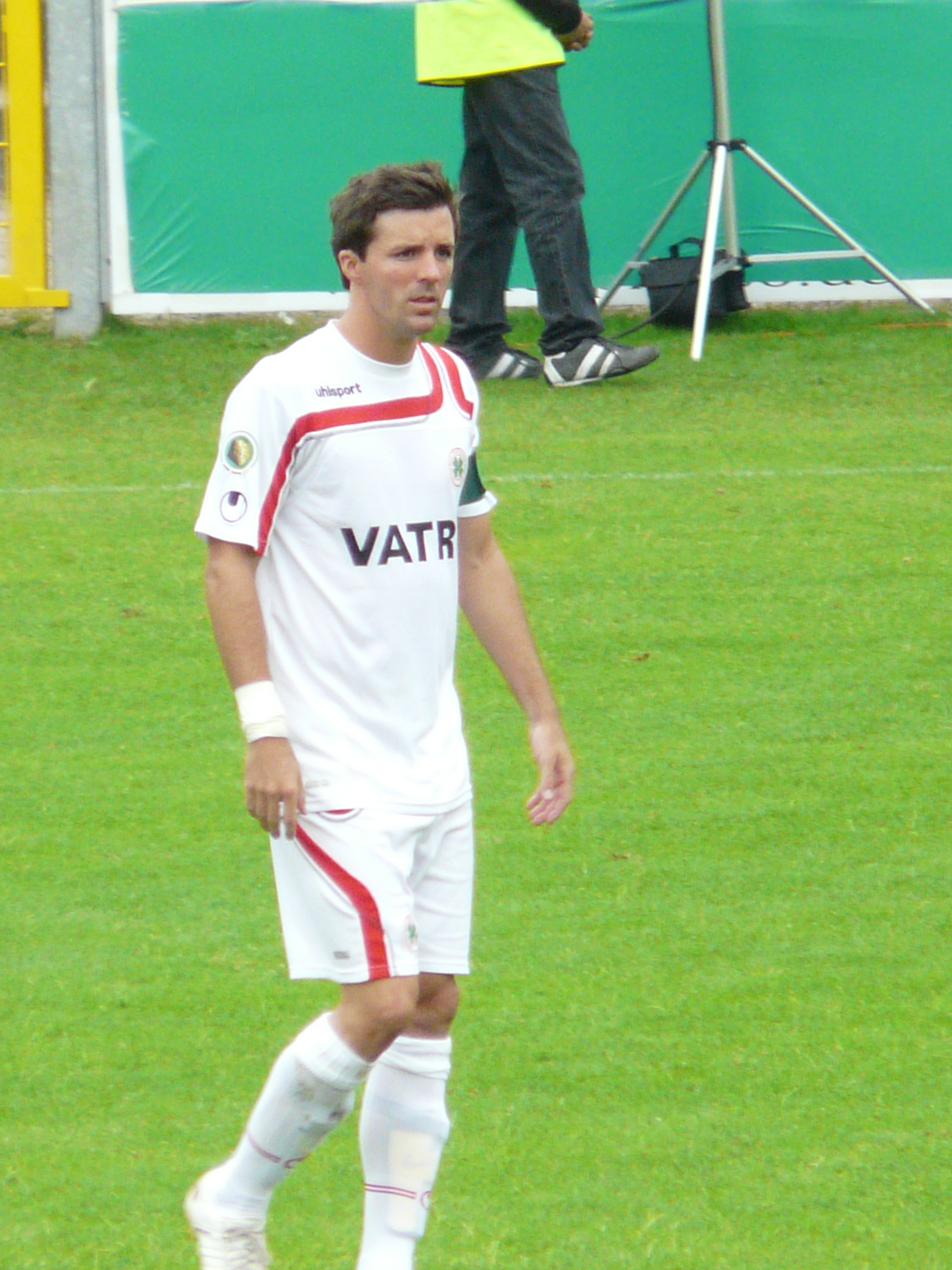
- Reichert in 2010

Personal information
- Date of birth: 17 May 1983 (age 43)
- Place of birth: Essen, West Germany
- Height: 1.80 m (5 ft 11 in)
- Position: Defender

Youth career
- 1988–2002: Rot-Weiß Oberhausen

Senior career*
Years	Team	Apps	(Gls)
2002–2012	Rot-Weiß Oberhausen	158	(3)
2012–2013	Wuppertaler SV Borussia	32	(3)
Total		190	(6)
- * Club domestic league appearances and goals

Benjamin Reichert (born 17 May 1983) is a German former professional football player and co-founder of the SK Gaming e-sports clan.

== Career ==
Reichert was born in Essen, North Rhine-Westphalia. He started his career in the junior teams of Rot-Weiß Oberhausen. His first call-up to the men's squad came in the 2002–03 season, where he was subbed into a game of RWO in the 2. Bundesliga. When Oberhausen was relegated into the Regionalliga and even into the Oberliga (third and fourth German soccer divisions), Reichert stuck with his team. He became a regular on the teams that were promoted into the Regionalliga in 2007–08 and into the 2. Bundesliga one year later.

Reichert is also notable as an e-sports pioneer. In 1997, he founded the clan SK Gaming (named "Schroet Kommando" back then) with his brothers Ralf and Tim Reichert and several other gamers, among them Musa Celik. Among gamers, Reichert was known as SK|Kane. Both Tim SK|Burke Reichert and Musa SK|kila Celik also played professional football for Rot-Weiß Oberhausen.
