= World Cyber Games 2007 =

The World Cyber Games 2007 was held in Seattle, Washington, held at the Qwest Field Event Center, the second time the WCG was held in an American location. It ran from October 3–7, 2007, and featured over 700 players from more than 70 different countries.

== Official games ==
=== PC games ===
- Age of Empires III: The WarChiefs
- Carom3D
- Command & Conquer 3: Tiberium Wars
- FIFA 07
- Counter-Strike 1.6
- Need for Speed: Carbon
- StarCraft: Brood War
- Warcraft III: The Frozen Throne

=== Xbox 360 games ===
- Dead or Alive 4
- Gears of War
- Project Gotham Racing 3
- Tony Hawk's Project 8

== Results ==
Event	Gold		Silver		Bronze	
Age of Empires III	(South Korea) Byung-Geon Kang (iamgrunt)		(United States) Raghav Phadke (parfait)		(Germany) Karsten Hager (SkWzZ_Phoenix)	
Carom3D	(Brazil) Renan Masserani (TheVilMan)		(Italy) Valerio Affuso (Duccio)		(Brazil) Guilherme Cerqueira (iOi_BR)	
Command and Conquer 3	(United Kingdom) Shaun Clark (d.Apollooo)		(Germany) Leon Machens (Xeon)		(Germany) Pascal Pfefferle (a-L.Dackel)	
Counter-Strike	eMulate (France)	Michael Zanatta (HaRts)	Team NoA (Denmark)	Alexander Holdt (ave)	Amazing Gaming (Ukraine)	Andrew Gordenskiy (B1ad3)
Counter-Strike	eMulate (France)	Mathieu Leber (MaT)	Team NoA (Denmark)	Muhamed Eid (mJe)	Amazing Gaming (Ukraine)	Iurii Tereshchenko (Strike)
Counter-Strike	eMulate (France)	Mathieu Bridet (R!Go)	Team NoA (Denmark)	\/|)	Amazing Gaming (Ukraine)	Alexey Kucherov (xaoc)
Counter-Strike	eMulate (France)	Jeremy Vuillermet (ioRek)	Team NoA (Denmark)	Brian Christensen (hpx)	Amazing Gaming (Ukraine)	Sergey Ishuk (starix)
Counter-Strike	eMulate (France)	Mickael Cassisi (mSx)	Team NoA (Denmark)	Christoffer Sunde (Sunde)	Amazing Gaming (Ukraine)	Mykola Poplavskyi (Weiss)
FIFA 07	(Germany) Daniel Schellhase (SK.Hero)		(Spain) Victor Sanchez Munoz (Delfin-1)		(Bulgaria) Ognyan Tomov([LnX]Slavkov)	
Need for Speed: Carbon	(Brazil) Rodrigo Nunes (playArt_SpeedNG)		(Netherlands) Steffan Amende (Steffan)		(Russia) Alan Enileev (Alan)	
StarCraft: Brood War	(South Korea) Byung-Goo Song (Stork)		(China) Sha Juchun (CN.Pj)		(Germany) Christoph Semke ((ToT)Mondragon)	
Warcraft 3	(Norway) Olav Undheim (4K-Creolophus)		(China) Li Xiaofeng (WE.SKY)		(South Korea) Jae-Ho Jang (Jang Jae Ho)	
Dead or Alive 4	(United States) Jeremy Florence (black_mamba)		(Sweden) Niklas Lagerborg (SkatanMilla)		(United States) Carl White (perfect_legend)	
Gears of War	InFiNiTy (United States)	Keith Hagen	QualityGaming (Netherlands)	Ken Harmsen	Infused-Gaming (United Kingdom)	Luke Shakespeare
Gears of War	InFiNiTy (United States)	Jesse Cranker	QualityGaming (Netherlands)	Jimmy Sloeserwij	Infused-Gaming (United Kingdom)	Callum Mcmanus
Gears of War	InFiNiTy (United States)	Mike Cannon	QualityGaming (Netherlands)	Richard Joon	Infused-Gaming (United Kingdom)	Jaden Dennis
Gears of War	InFiNiTy (United States)	Jesse Rodriguez	QualityGaming (Netherlands)	Sebastiaan Smit	Infused-Gaming (United Kingdom)	Joshua Nino De Guzman
Project Gotham Racing 3	(Netherlands) Wouter van Someren (Handewasser)		(United States) Wesley Cwiklo (chompr)		(Taiwan) Liu You-Chen (D2C-BURBERRYqq)	
Tony Hawk's Project 8	(United States) Dustin Valcalda (DuVaL_AK47)		(United Kingdom) David Treacy (Zaccubus)		(Austria) Mario Hunger (plan-B_WC_Ente)	
