= BorasLegend =

Swedish esports player (born 1992)

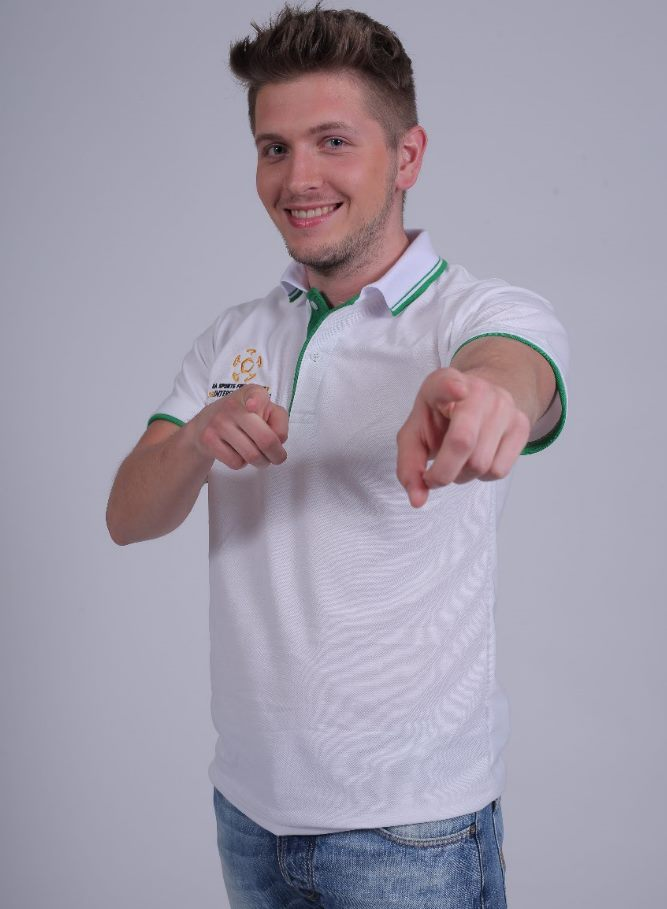

Personal information
- Name: Ivan Lapanje
- Born: 1 September 1992 (age 34)
- Nationality: Swedish, Croatian

Current team
- Team: BK Häcken
- Game: FIFA

Team history
- 2013–2014: Copenhagen Wolves
- 2014–2015: Alliance
- 2015: Trig eSports
- 2016–2018: Hashtag United

Ivan Lapanje (born 1 September 1992), better known as BorasLegend, is a Swedish competitive FIFA video game series player and currently ranked number one in Sweden. He won the Las Vegas World Challenge Series in 2013 and is a multiple Swedish Champion. He is the top competitive earner of the FIFA video game series and widely regarded as one of the greatest FIFA players in history.

== Biography and career ==
Lapanje was born in Croatia on 1 September 1992. Lapanje's family emigrated to Sweden when Lapanje was an infant due to the Bosnian War and Croatian War of Independence. At age of seven his family moved from the small village Gödestad to Borås, where he has lived since. His gamertag BorasLegend is a reference to his home town Borås. He played in Swedish football club IF Elfsborg youth academy for eight years, but quit at age of 15. Two years later he quit his football career due to injuries.

He started to play FIFA at early age but got his big interest for it when he quit his football career. In his first competition in 2009 he came to the final of a big offline tournament but lost to Avan “aaviboy” Rashid. Some days later he got his revenge in the unofficial Swedish Championship at Dreamhack Winter where he beat the same Avan Rashid with 3–1.

After his triumph he took a break to focus on studies and work but came back in 2012 to compete in the Swedish Championship. He managed to go all the way to the final, where he eventually lost to Filip “Stek” Persson after a nail-biting best-of-three series. The defeat was a big reverse. After the loss Ivan Lapanje decided to put full effort on Fifa and quit his job at Hennes & Mauritz. In the autumn of 2012 he took home the Swedish E-Football challenge after beating Filip Persson in semi and the future rival Lukas “Lukasinho” Gummesson in the final.

In the beginning of 2013 he attended the Virgin Gaming Challenge Series in Las Vegas. He managed to go all the way and win the world title after defeating Rafael “Ralfitita” Riobo in the final with 3–1. He also took home US$140,000, which is still to date one of the biggest single winnings in e-sport history. A month after the triumph in Las Vegas, he won the Swedish competition Metallsvenskan in Örebro after beating Lukas Gummesson in the final. But the sweetest win for the Swede was the Swedish Championship on Dreamhack Summer, where he got his revenge after previous year's final loss. He beat Lukas Gummesson in the final and claimed his second Swedish national title and the first official Swedish title. This summer he got his first sponsor signing after joining the Copenhagen Wolves.

Ivan Lapanje took part in the ESWC in France for the first time in the autumn of 2013. He went to semifinal, where he lost to Frenchman Vincent “Vinch” Hoffman, who later won the competition. In the bronze placement game the Swede beat the Dutchman Alban “azzufdarra” Xhemajli.

In 2014 Ivan Lapanje joined the e-sport organization Alliance. His first competition was Maxinge Challenge in Finland, where he reached final but lost to Lukas “Lukasinho” Gummesson after three long games that led to a penalty shootout. The same Lukasinho beat BorasLegend two months later in the finals of Karlstad Open. After several final defeats that year, Boras stepped up in the Swedish championship in the summer of 2014. BorasLegend defended his Swedish national title after defeating the up comer Lucas “Afro” Wallman in the final with 1–0, 3–2. He continued his winning streak by winning the online competition Showmatch Spring against the Italian Diego Campagnani. Some months later he returned to the ESWC and Paris. This time he suffered another semifinal loss against the Iranian Navid “Adamant” Borhani who eventually won the final.

In 2015 he joined the Swedish side Trig Esports. This year was his toughest in his career where he was very unsatisfied with the FIFA 15 engine. Still he managed to win the Swedish online competition Cashligan in April for the first time since 2013 after winning the final against Christian “chrillegbg” Bergenholtz. In May 2015, BorasLegend got eliminated from the Swedish Championship in quarterfinals after a penalty shootout against Rasmus “pettsson” Pettersson and was thus unable to defend his title which he had held for 2 years. In November 2015 he announced on his Facebook Page that he is leaving Trig E-sport due to their economic problems.

In 2016, For the first time in his career BorasLegend attended the Fifa Interactive World Cup grand finals. He started strongly, winning his group, by many considered the group of death, after beating former World Champion August "Agge" Rosenmeier. He continued by eliminating the German Benedikt "SaLz0r" Saltzer in the round of 16. In the quarterfinals he beat the American hope Mike Ribeiro 2-1 and moved on to the semifinals. He got the nickname "Comeback King" after coming back from being down in all his games. In the semifinal against Mohamad "Bacha" Al-Bacha, he could not comeback and lost 1–2 against Bacha, who later went on to win the tournament, becoming the new World Champion. BorasLegends first FIWC adventure ended with a bronze medal (after competition ranking decider), which is Sweden's first medal in the FIWC history.

The season of 16 was in general marked by a lack of competitions. The national championship was canceled and Boras was thus unable to retrieve the title from FIFA 14 and 13. However Boras made a good run on the international scene, beside his triumph in the world cup. In Gfinity's Play like a legend (FUT) he managed to qualify to 2 out of 3 live events and reached a top 10 placement in the Grand Finals hosted in London. Later he traveled to Bangkok to compete in the Asian game Fifa Online 3. Despite a few days practice he managed to finish top 4 after losing in semifinal to the eventual champion Seop Kim after a penalty shootout.

BorasLegend started Fifa 17 in a very strong way by finishing on the first place on the Ultimate Team world ranking for October month. In the end of October he participated in ESWC for the third time in his career. After a bad start in the group stage he defeated Sean Allen with 6–1 in this last game which sent him through to the playoffs. However, he afterwards got disqualified for using an unregistered player, Hugo Lloris, in three of his games. The decision was controversial and many fans protested but ESWC's decision remained. Shortly after he signed with the British club Hashtag United, ending his 1-year period as a free agent.

Following a successful Fifa 18 season, in which he reached the FIFA eWorld Cup grand final, he left Hashtag United in order to work in Sweden. After 6 months of being a free agent, he finally signed for Swedish club BK Häcken. He represented them in the eAllsvenskan, the eSports equivalent of the Swedish first division the Allsvenskan.

== Other ==
Ivan Lapanje has featured as commentator for the Swedish e-sport project E-svenskan along with Jesper Hussfelt. In 2015, he was also featured in the ongoing web TV show “Sportbladet Fifa Challenge” where he travels home to Swedish football players to challenge them in FIFA (video game series). He is a dedicated S.S. Lazio supporter.
