= Het is een schone dag geweest =

1993 Dutch documentary film

- Directed by: Jos de Putter
- Release date: 1993
- Running time: 70 minutes
- Country: Netherlands
- Language: Dutch

Het is een schone dag geweest is a 1993 Dutch documentary film directed by Jos de Putter.

== Synopsis ==
The film is a portrait of Putter's family and their life on the farm.
