= Batoo =

Batoo is a Korean variant of the board game Go. The name stems from a combination of the Korean words baduk (“Go”) and juntoo (“battle”). It is played entirely in cyberspace, and differs from Go in a number of ways, most noticeably in the way in which certain areas of the board are worth different point values. The other principal difference is that both players place three stones before the game begins, and may also place a special “hidden stone”, which affects the board as a regular stone but is invisible to the opponent. It was launched in November 2008; in April 2021 a new server at foh.epizy.com started to manage Batoo games.

== Gameplay ==
Batoo is usually played on an 11x11 board, although some games may take place on boards as large as 13x13. Boards in Batoo usually have plus-point and minus-point spots. When a player plays on these spots, they will either gain or lose five points. Different "maps" will have different plus-point locations and minus-point locations. Before the game begins, both players place a "base build", consisting of three marked stones. When players are making their base-builds, they cannot see their opponent's base build. If there is any overlap, a minus-point will replace the pair of stones. Base stones are worth 5 points each, as opposed to a normal stone which is worth only 1.

The player who starts is the one who makes the highest bid of points to their opponent for the privilege. This process is also known as "turn-betting". Once the base-building and the turn-betting end, both players have 25-second intervals to make each move. For every stone on the board, a player will gain 1 point. If a player takes more than 25 seconds to make their move, they lose 2 points (unless a 'special ability' character is used) and a new 25-second interval begins. If more than 3 25-second intervals are taken by any player during the game, that player loses the game. The territory each player has at the end of the game is then added to the score.

== Hidden stone ==
The most unusual aspect about Batoo is the Hidden Stone. Once per game, every player may play a Hidden Stone instead of a normal stone. The Hidden Stone is not revealed to the opponent until they play a move where the Hidden Stone is located or until they locate it with a scan. A player may play a "scan" for 2 points, where they click a spot on the board and discover whether or not the Hidden Stone is on it. The player may make a normal or hidden stone move following the scan.

== Characters, special abilities, and customization ==
A player can select one of three characters that grant the player special abilities. A fourth character can be bought using the in-game currency. The players can also buy different color substitutes for black stones [dark red, dark green, dark violet, dark blue] and can also buy different-looking boards with different themes with the in-game currency.

== Ranking ==
Player ability in Batoo is determined by "levels". Learners start at level 5, and can progress up to level 35.
