= SK Gaming =

Professional eSports organization

- Short name: SK
- Divisions: Brawl Stars; Clash Royale; Esports Virtual Arenas (EVA); League of Legends; Rocket League; Valorant
- Founded: 1997; 28–29 years ago
- Location: Cologne, Germany
- Colours
- CEO: Alexander T. Müller
- Partners: Deutsche Telekom; REWE; Sony; Subway; Sandisk
- Website: www.sk-gaming.com

SK Gaming is a professional esports organization based in Germany that has teams across the world competing in different titles. The organization is particularly known for their success in Counter-Strike (CS) tournaments. The team began in 1997 by a small group of Quake players in Oberhausen under the name Schröt Kommando. During the mid-2000s, SK achieved success across multiple titles, including Counter-Strike, Quake, FIFA, and later World of Warcraft. However, the organization faced recurring roster instability and internal controversies. From 2009 onward, SK underwent major reorganization, including leadership changes, roster overhauls, and a shift toward a more conservative business model. The organization entered and exited numerous esports scenes, including StarCraft II, League of Legends, Heroes of Newerth, Dota 2, console esports, and others. In 2012, SK permanently shut down its Counter-Strike division. Subsequent years saw continued contraction, high-profile player departures, and the loss of long-standing sponsors.

== History ==
=== Beginnings ===
Schröt Kommando was founded in 1997 as a German Quake clan by four brothers and three accomplices in Oberhausen. The original line-up of Schroet Kommando consisted of Ralf "Griff" Reichert, Daniel "Godlike" Beames, Tim "Burke" Reichert, Benjamin "Kane" Reichert, Kristof "Speed" Salwiczek, Carsten "Storch" Kramer and Sven "Ramses" Tümmers. According to Ralf Reichert, the original naming of the organization originated from one of the members repeatedly shouting "Schröt!" This was a common occurrence from whenever a double-barreled shotgun would be handled, due to the translation meaning "shrapnel". Eventually, the team adopted this into their name, thus becoming "Schroet Kommando". Since then, the organization began using their abbreviation more often, until it eventually became SK Gaming.

Initially, the Beames family home operated as the Schroet Kommando headquarters, concentrating primarily upon the Quake series. Early on, Schroet Kommando became one of the first clans to feature an all-female team; the most notable of which was Annemarie "XS" Warnkross, who later became a well-known host on German television. The organization expanded into Counter-Strike, where it became known as one of the most-successful squads in all of Germany. In September 2001, Andreas "bds" Thorstensson merged his Geekboys team and news syndicate with that of SK Gaming, with a long-term prospect of emphasizing the success of his own organization. Thorstensson revolutionized electronic sports by having SK act as the first organization to have payable premium services ("SK Insider", a virtual marketplace in which subscribers could download demos (replays), mods and add-ons better and earlier than others, talk directly to SK gamers etc.). The organization's international Counter-Strike success came when they signed on the players of the successful Swedish Counter-Strike clan Ninjas in Pyjamas. In 2003, SK Gaming became the first electronic sports organization to contract players, beginning with the SK Sweden Counter-Strike squad.

=== Later years ===
The 2006 season brought no successes to the Counter-Strike team, the most notable of which, the team failed to qualify for the Electronic Sports World Cup, in which Sweden was represented by rivals Ninjas in Pyjamas and the developing Fnatic team. Thereafter, the team managed to qualify for the KODE5 finals, where they won two matches and lost to the Brazilians from Made in Brazil during the group stages. They then lost to Wisdom Nerve Victory in the single elimination round, placing fifth to eighth overall. Success did come for the Quake 4 squad however, as the Swedish star player Johan "Toxic" Quick managed to win eight out of the ten major tournaments during that year, including four out of five World Championships. Meanwhile, the FIFA 06 squad had a successful year, as the team managed to win the prestigious Electronic Sports League Pro Series twice, and the German player Daniel "hero" Schellhase won the World Cyber Games championship.

In 2008, SK Gaming began to invest in World of Warcraft and shortly before the release of the Sunwell Plateau, the final and most challenging raid encounter of World of Warcraft: The Burning Crusade, the organization sponsored Curse, one of the highest-ranked guilds at the time. SK Gaming's German competitor, Mousesports, had significantly commanded the recognition with maintaining Nihilum, the most-successful guild in the world, achieving a strong majority of world first raid kills. The newly recruited SK.PvE squad, however, had a strong winning streak during the Sunwell Plateau and completed most of the instance's boss kills first. Due to differences in interests, the PvE team was dismissed, with a stronger emphasis upon the PvP aspect. Near the end of 2008, SK Gaming entered the competitive console scene, with acquisition of a German Xbox team.

=== Stability issues and reorganization ===
Beginning in the fall of 2009, the Counter-Strike squad would encounter long-term stability issues, as long-time member Kristoffer "Tentpole" Nordlund and Marcus "zet" Sundström were removed from the roster for disagreements and misrepresentation issues. The roster began refocusing with the acquisition of H2k Gaming players Johan "face" Klasson and Frej "kHRYSTAL" Sjöström, which gained its best respective victory two weeks after the change with a gold medal victory against Fnatic. 2009 marked the conclusion of managing director and partial owner Andreas Thorstensson's tenure, as he stepped down from SK Gaming to further pursue his web development career, giving full executive authority to Alexander T. Müller-Rodic, thereby making SK Gaming a singular German organization. Alongside Thorstensson's departure, the highly successful Warcraft III departed, as well, in order to make way for SK Gaming to operate as a more conservative business. To accommodate for the Counter-Strike stability issues, SK Gaming announced the replacement of Frej "kHRYSTAL" Sjöström with the former Fnatic player Rasmus "GuX" Ståhl. A dispute arose between SK Gaming and Fnatic over the transfer of Counter-Strike player Rasmus "GuX" Ståhl. Ståhl did not technically sign his contract with SK after five months, while still receiving months of payment and was intended to attend Arbalet Dallas with his team, after his plane ticket was purchased. However, it was revealed through Ståhl's message logs that Fnatic had paid him not to use SK's ticket to Dallas Despite the closure of SK's investment into the Action RTS scene with the departure of its Defense of the Ancients team in 2009, SK Gaming took in a squad for the relatively unknown title Avalon Heroes in 2010, as well as an American Heroes of Newerth squad and a European League of Legends squad. In August 2010, welcomed back Warcraft III veteran Fredrik "MaDFroG" Johansson, with the creation of the organization's StarCraft II division. 2010 marked the final year in which SK Gaming would support World of Warcraft, with the removal of its European, American and Asian squads, as well as the unannounced closure of its Sansibar squad. On 3 December, it was announced that the German FIFA duo of Daniel "hero" Schellhase and Dennis "styla" Schellhase would be retiring from eSports, following a joint brotherly career as the most-successful virtual sports players of all time. In a massive Counter-Strike roster overhaul on 7 December, SK Gaming signed on the departing Fnatic players Patrik "f0rest" Lindberg and Christopher "GeT_RiGhT" Alesund, (the latter of whom played for the organization previously), while also seeing the departure of Dennis "walle" Wallenberg. On 21 December, it was announced that SK Gaming would be closing its Counter-Strike female team, as well as its short-lived Counter-Strike: Source team, in order to retain a more conservative roster for 2011.

The first development of 2011 constituted the trimming of the Xbox 360 sports roster and the addition of a competitive Call of Duty: Black Ops team, as well as the addition of newcomers Hun "inuh" Park and Jimmy "jimpo" Wölfinger to the StarCraft II team. These new StarCraft II players would, however, become the entirety of the division, as it was soon announced afterwards that Fredrik "MaDFroG" Johansson would not be given a contract for 2011. On 16 January, it was announced that SK Gaming would be adding another United States Counter-Strike division, which would include former SK Gaming female member Alice "ali" Lew. On 28 February, SK Gaming announced that Toshiba would be taking the reins of main sponsor from Acer Inc., which had served as the primary sponsor since 2009. On 12 March, SK Gaming announced the additions of the up and rising StarCraft II Dane Johannes Sabroe "Joe" Witt, as well as a Bloodline Champions squad. On 4 April, five-year Counter-Strike player, Jimmy "allen" Allén, announced his inactivity, due to considerable health ailments, setting the stage for the trial replacement, Dennis "dennis" Edman. However, on 23 May, SK Gaming declared that Edman would no longer be playing for the organization and that Allén would participate in the WCG Swedish Qualifier the following weekend. On 29 May, however, a permanent replacement was made with the still-contracted Fnatic player and former SK stand-in, Marcus "Delpan" Larsson. On 23 June, following a disappointing Dreamhack appearance, SK Gaming's League of Legends team underwent a massive overhaul, removing the vast majority of the squad, but bringing in recently dismissed players from other professional organizations. On 1 July, it was announced that the SK Gaming's Heroes of Newerth team would be replaced by the former squad of Evil Geniuses. On Independence Day of 2011, July 4th, SK Gaming released its European StarCraft II roster consisting of Hun "inuh" Park, Jimmy "jimpo" Wölfinger and Johannes Sabroe "Joe" Witt, citing unsatisfactory performances. The squad was remade, however, on 15 July, with the partnership with the South Korean pro-gamer house Old Generations, for SK Gaming to sponsor Min Chul "MC" Jang and Yoon-Yeol "NaDa" Lee for international events. Due to long-term prospective differences, the Heroes of Newerth once again parted ways with the organization, during SK's attendance at Gamescom. SK Gaming would invest in a different sector of the action RTS scene, however, with the acquisition of an all-Danish Dota 2 squad previously known as Next Evolution ESC, in November 2011, but dismissed the team for the unpredictability of the relatively young scene for the game.

In early 2012, the partnership between SK Gaming and Old Generations ended, with Min Chul "MC" Jang joining the organization, while Yoon-Yeol "NaDa" Lee remained with oGs. In a surprising move, SK Gaming announced that the Counter-Strike team would be removing the player with the shortest tenure, Marcus "Delpan" Larsson, in favor of their first permanent Danish member and former mTw ace, Martin Alexander "trace" Bang Heldt at the end of January. On 13 April, however, Larsson once more returned to the team, replacing Heldt. On 27 July 2012, it was announced that SK Gaming's Counter-Strike division would lose Robert "RobbaN" Dahlström, Patrik "f0rest" Lindberg and Christopher "GeT_RiGhT" Alesund, as well as team captain Anton Budak, due to SK's decision to not send the team to GameGune 2012. On 30 July, SK Gaming announced the final closing of the Counter-Strike division.

On 15 January 2013, it was determined that SteelSeries has ended their ten-year sponsorship of SK Gaming, in addition to Evil Geniuses. In an annual wrap-up, SK's CEO Alexander T. Müller-Rodic announced the departures of League of Legends players Carlos "ocelote" Rodríguez Santiago, Patrick "Nyph" Funke, as well as the sole StarCraft II player Min Chul "MC" Jang and sports player Bruce "Spank" Grannec.

In January 2017 it was announced that Visa would be a sponsor of SK Gaming.

== Business model ==
SK Gaming is incorporated as a German limited liability company (GmbH). Its owners are Alexander Müller-Rodic, Andreas Thorstensson and Ralf Reichert. SK Gaming operates largely due to its sponsorships, most-notably by Toshiba, Kingston Technology and Bigben. The company also finances itself by the "SK Insider" subscription service. However, according to Rodic, the vast majority of the company's funds originates from sponsorships.

== League of Legends ==
Riot Games announced on 20 November 2018 that SK Gaming would be one of ten franchise partners participating in the newly rebranded League of Legends European Championship (LEC). On 20 December 2018, the organisation announced it had signed top laner Jorge "Werlyb" Casanovas Moreno-Torres, jungler Oskar "Selfmade" Boderek, mid laner Choi "Pirean" Jun-sik, bot laner Jus "Crownshot" Marusic and support Han "Dreams" Min-kook for their starting roster in the 2019 LEC Spring Split.

== Rosters ==
SK Gaming rosters

Brawl Stars
Handle	Name	Nationality
Yoshi	Cayetano Gómez, David	Spain
OPE	Mangelle, Alexis	France
Yoko	Goblet, Dawson	France

Clash Royale
Handle	Name	Nationality
Morten	Mehmert, Morten	Germany
xopxsam	Klotz, Samuel	Germany

Esports Virtual Arenas (EVA)
Handle	Name	Nationality
EmeraldoJo	Arias Huvat Jo, Emeraldo	Germany
Florian	Schmitz, Florian	Germany
KaChow	Lütkehoff, Tom	Germany
Phillip	Schmitz, Phillip	Germany
ProGly	Meistrik, Tom	Germany
TigroR8	Sondermann, Timo	Germany

League of Legends (LEC)
Handle	Name	Nationality
Wunder	Hansen, Martin	Denmark
Skeanz	Marquet, Duncan	France
SlowQ	Seo Ye-bit	South Korea
Jopa	Čančar, Josip	Croatia
Mikyx	Mehle, Mihael	Slovenia
LIDER (I)	Ilyasov, Adam	Norway

League of Legends (Note: Women's team that competes under the name SK Gaming Avarosa.)
Handle	Name	Nationality
GWolfieG	Kraft, Lily	Germany
Yushia	Boldor, Iulia	Romania
Apollonia	Gkerveni, Dafni	Greece
Nenris	Schmalfuß, Alessandra	Germany
Aos Si	Sophia	France

Rocket League
Handle	Name	Nationality
ivn	Sabri, Ivan	Austria
Alyiuu	Färber, Joel	Germany
NKS	Fisch, Nicklas	Germany

Valorant (Note: Women's team that competes under the name SK Gaming Nebula.)
Handle	Name	Nationality
Joliinaa	Agélii, Tina Joli	Sweden
Liza	Lyubovina, Elizaveta	Russia
fluxxy	Ainslie, Lola	Scotland
rezq	Akçocuk, Eda Naz	Turkey
Thuy	Duong, Ngoc-Thuy	Vietnam

Legend:
- (I) Inactive
- (S) Suspended
- (L) On loan
- (2W) Two-way player
- Substitute
- (injured) Injury / Illness

== Notable alumni ==
- Tim "Burke" Reichert (Quake)
- Benjamin "Kane" Reichert (Quake)
- Musa "kila" Celik (Quake)
- Emil "HeatoN" Christensen (Counter-Strike)
- Andreas "bds" Thorstensson (Counter-Strike)
- Park "Lyn" June (Warcraft III)
- Fredrik "MaDFroG" Johansson (Warcraft III, StarCraft II)
- Lee "NaDa" Yoon-yeol (StarCraft II)
- Patrik "f0rest" Lindberg (Counter-Strike)
- Christopher "GeT_RiGhT" Alesund (Counter-Strike)
- Jang "MC" Min-chul (StarCraft II)
- Dennis "Svenskeren" Johnsen (League of Legends)
- Mikail "Maikelele" Bill (Counter-Strike: Global Offensive)
- Shane "rapha" Hendrixson (Quake)
- Gabriel "FalleN" Toledo de Alcântara Sguario (Counter-Strike: Global Offensive)

== Selected achievements ==
=== Counter-Strike: Global Offensive ===
Bold denotes a CS:GO Major

==== 2016 ====
- **1st ESL One Cologne 2016**
- 3rd-4th ESL One New York 2016
- 2nd ESL Pro League Season 4, 2016
- 2nd Intel Extreme Masters Season XI Oakland
- 3rd-4th ELEAGUE Season 2
- 3rd-4th Esports Championship Series Season 2

==== 2017 ====
- 3rd-4th **ELEAGUE Major 2017**
- 2nd DreamHack Masters Las Vegas 2017
- 1st cs_summit
- 1st Intel Extreme Masters Season XII - Sydney
- 1st DreamHack Open Summer 2017
- 1st Esports Championship Series Season 3
- 5th-8th **PGL Major Kraków 2017**
- 3rd-4th ESL One New York 2017
- 1st EPICENTER 2017
- 3rd-4th Intel Extreme Masters Season XII – Oakland
- 1st BLAST Pro Series: Copenhagen 2017
- 1st ESL Pro League Season 6

==== 2018 ====
- 3rd-4th **ELEAGUE Major: Boston 2018**
- 1st WESG North America Regional Finals
- 3rd cs_summit 2
- 5th-8th StarLadder & i-League StarSeries Season 4
- 5th-6th ESL Pro League Season 7 - Finals
- 1st Adrenaline Cyber League 2018
- 5th-8th StarSeries i-League Season 5
- 1st Moche XL eSports CS:GO Cup

=== Counter-Strike ===
- **CPL**

1st CPL Winter 2005 – Dallas
1st CPL Summer 2005 – Dallas
2nd CPL Summer 2004 – Dallas
1st CPL Winter 2003 – Dallas
1st CPL Europe 2003 – Copenhagen
1st CPL Summer 2003 – Dallas
1st CPL Europe 2003 – Cannes
3rd CPL Winter 2002 – Dallas
1st CPL Summer 2002 – Dallas
3rd CPL Europe 2002 – Cologne

- **ESL**

1st ESL Extreme Masters IV 09/10: Global Challenge New York – New York City
3rd ESL Extreme Masters IV 09/10: Global Finals – Germany
3rd ESL Extreme Masters IV 09/10: Global Challenge Dubai – Dubai
1st ESL Extreme Masters IV 09/10: Global Challenge Chengdu – Chengdu
2nd ESL Extreme Masters III 08/09: Global Challenge Montreal – Montreal
1st ESL Extreme Masters III 08/09: Global Challenge Los Angeles – Los Angeles
2nd ESL Extreme Masters II 07/08: Global Challenge Los Angeles – Los Angeles

- **ESWC**

1st ESWC 2011 – Paris
2nd ESWC Masters Cheonan 2009 – Cheonan
2nd ESWC 2005 – Paris
3rd ESWC 2003 – Poitiers

- **KODE5**

2nd KODE5 08/09 – Moscow
3rd KODE5 07/08 – Moscow

- **WCG**

2nd WCG 2011 – Busan
2nd WCG 2008 – Cologne
1st WCG Euro Championship 2007 – Hannover
1st WCG 2003 – Seoul

=== Zonerank rankings ===
- Top Ranking: 2nd (March 2008)
- Current Ranking: 2nd

=== Quake, Painkiller & Unreal Tournament ===
- 1st KODE5 Finals 2006 – Johan "Toxic" Quick (Quake 4)
- 1st QuakeCon 2006 – Johan "Toxic" Quick (Quake 4)
- 1st World Series of Video Games Intel Summer Championship 2006 – Johan "Toxic" Quick (Quake 4)
- 2nd World Series of Video Games Sweden 2006 – Johan "Toxic" Quick (Quake 4)
- 1st World Series of Video Games London 2006 – Johan "Toxic" Quick (Quake 4)
- 1st DigitalLife 2006 – Johan "Toxic" Quick (Quake 4)
- 1st World Cyber Games 2006 – Johan "Toxic" Quick (Quake 4)
- 1st World Series of Video Games Finals 2006 – Johan "Toxic" Quick (Quake 4)
- 2nd 2005 CPL World Tour: Istanbul – Benjamin "zyz" Bohrmann (Painkiller)
- 1st 2005 CPL World Tour: Spain – Stephan "SteLam" Lammert (Painkiller)
- 3rd 2005 CPL World Tour: Brazil – Benjamin "zyz" Bohrmann (Painkiller)
- 3rd Electronic Sports World Cup 2005 – Fox (Quake 3)
- 3rd 2005 CPL World Tour: United Kingdom – Benjamin "zyz" Bohrmann (Painkiller)
- 2nd CPL 2005 Winter – Johan "Toxic" Quick (Quake 4)
- 3rd Cyberathlete Professional League: Summer 2004 – Stephan "SteLam" Lammert (Painkiller)
- 1st Cyberathlete Professional League: Summer 2004 – Team (Unreal Tournament 2004)
- 2nd Electronic Sports World Cup 2004 – Christian "GitzZz" Hoeck (Unreal Tournament 2004)
- 1st Electronic Sports World Cup 2003 – Christian "GitzZz" Hoeck (Unreal Tournament 2003)
- 3rd World Cyber Games 2001 – Stephan "SteLam" Lammert (Quake 3)

World Championships

- KODE5 (2006, Quake 4)
- World Cyber Games (2006, Quake 4)
- World Series of Video Games (2006, Quake 4)
- Electronic Sports World Cup (2003, Unreal Tournament)

=== Warcraft III ===
- 1st WCG SEC 2007 – Mykhaylo "HoT" Novopashyn
- 2nd World Series of Videogames, Finals 2006 – Jung Hee "jamem" Chun
- 3rd World Cyber Games 2006 – Mykhaylo "HoT" Novopashyn
- 1st KODE5 2006- Andrey "Deadman" Sobolev
- 1st World Series of Videogames, China 2006 – Jung Hee "Sweet" Chun
- 1st World Series of Videogames, Sweden 2006 – Andrey "Deadman" Sobolev
- 2nd NGL One Season I 2006 – Team
- 3rd Warcraft 3 Champions League V 2006 – Team
- 1st ClanBase EuroCup 2005 – Mykhaylo "HoT" Novopashyn
- 3rd CPL Summer 2005 – Björn "ElakeDuck" ödman
- 2nd Electronic Sports World Cup 2005 – Andrey "Deadman" Sobolev
- 3rd ACON5 2005 – Andrey "Deadman" Sobolev
- 3rd Warcraft 3 Champions League VII 2005 – Team
- 2nd World E-Sport Games I 2005 – Tae min "Zacard" Hwang
- 3rd Warcraft 3 Champions League VI 2004 – Team
- 2nd World Cyber Games 2004 – Tae min "Zacard" Hwang
- 2nd Electronic Sports World Cup 2004 – Fredrik "MaDFroG" Johansson
- 3rd Electronic Sports World Cup 2004 – Alborz "HeMaN" Haidarian
- 3rd ACON4 2004 – Jung Hee "Sweet" Chun
- 3rd Warcraft 3 Champions League V 2004 – Team
- 1st Blizzard Worldwide Invitational 2004 – Fredrik "MaDFroG" Johansson
- 3rd Cyber X Gaming 2004 – Zdravko "Insomnia" Georgiev
- 1st World Cyber Games 2003 – Zdravko "Insomnia" Georgiev
- 1st Euro Cyber Games 2003 – Antoine "FaTC" Zadri
- 2nd Euro Cyber Games 2003 – Georgi "Zeerax" Marinov
- 1st Electronic Sports World Cup 2003 – Alborz "HeMaN" Haidarian
- 2nd Electronic Sports World Cup 2003 – Fredrik "MaDFroG" Johansson
- 3rd Clikarena 2003 – Zdravko "Insomnia" Georgiev
- 2nd CPL Cannes 2003 – Zdravko "Insomnia" Georgiev
- 2nd CPL Oslo 2002 – Sven "Kovax" Running
- 3rd CPL Oslo 2002 – Fahad "DsCo" Hamid

World Championships

- KODE5 (2006)
- Blizzard Worldwide Invitational (2004)
- World Cyber Games (2003)
- Electronic Sports World Cup (2003)

=== World of Warcraft ===
- World 1st kill of Felmyst
- World 1st kill of M'uru
- World 1st kill of Kil'jaeden – (final boss of The Burning Crusade).
- SK.US 1st Place at MLG Columbus
- SK.US 1st Place at the Blizzard Regional Finals
- SK.US 4th Place – BlizzCon 3vs3 World Finals 2009
- SK.US 1st Place – BlizzCon 3vs3 World Finals 2015

Awards and achievements
Preceded by MLG Columbus 2016; Luminosity Gaming	ESL One Cologne 2016 winner 2016	Succeeded by ELEAGUE Major 2017; Astralis
