= Laurens Pluijmaekers =

Dutch e-sports player (born 1984)

Lauke
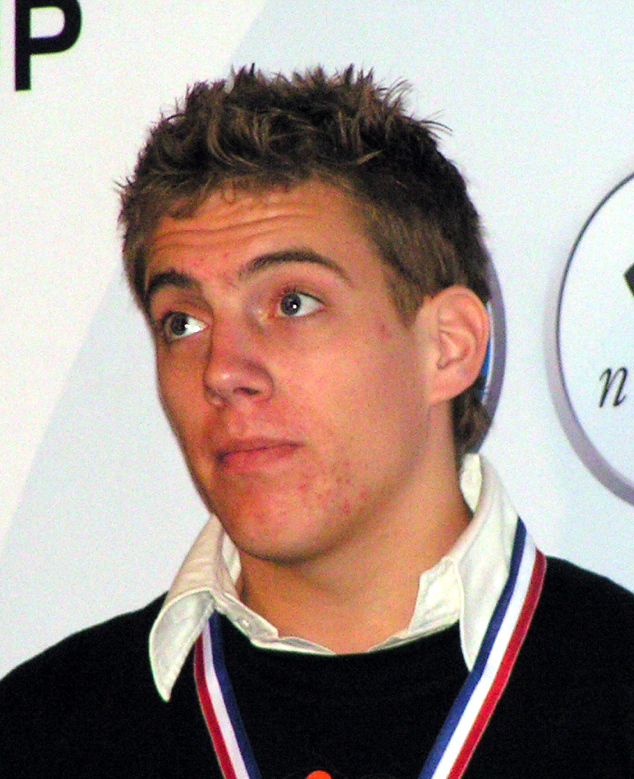
- Lauke at ESWC 2005

Personal information
- Name: Laurens Pluijmaekers
- Born: September 22, 1984 (age 42)
- Nationality: Dutch

Career information
- Games: Unreal Tournament

Team history
- ?–?: fnatic

Laurens "Lauke" Pluijmaekers (Dutch pronunciation: [ˈlʌurɛns ˈplœymaːkərs]; sometimes spelled Pluymaekers; born September 22, 1984) is a Dutch former professional Unreal Tournament player. Lauke won the gold medal in Unreal Tournament 2004 at the World Cyber Games 2004.

== Notable achievements ==
=== Tournament and placement ===
- 2001 WCG 2001 UT, Seoul: #4
- 2002 WCG 2002 UT, Daejon: #5
- 2003 Euskal 11 UT2003, Bilbao: #1
- 2003 ESWC 2003 UT2003, Poitiers: #5
- 2003 WCG 2003 UT2003, Seoul: #2
- 2004 cXg UT2004, Las Vegas: #1
- 2004 WCG 2004 UT2004, San Francisco: #1
- 2004 ESWC 2004 UT2004, Poitiers: #3
- 2004 EOGC 2004 UT2004, London: #1
- 2005 GGL Digitallife UT2004, New York: #1
- 2005 ECG 2005 UT2004, Hannover: #3
- 2005 ESWC 2005 UT2004, Paris: #3

=== Awards ===
- 2004 UT2004 Player of The Year
