= Esports World Convention =

International esports competition (2003–2018)

eSports World Convention
- Formerly: LAN Arena (before 2003); Electronic Sports World Cup (2003–2016)
- Game: Call of Duty; Counter-Strike: Global Offensive
- Founded: 2003
- Folded: 2018
- Replaced by: Esports World Cup (ESWC brand acquired in 2023)
- Country: France
- Continent: Europe
- Website: www.eswc.com

The Esports World Convention (ESWC; known as the Electronic Sports World Cup until early 2016) was an international professional gaming championship. Every year, winners of national qualifier events around the world earned the right to represent their country in the ESWC Finals.

The ESWC was originally created by a French company, Ligarena, that had previously hosted smaller local area network (LAN) events in France under the name of LAN Arena. In 2003, Ligarena decided to do something on a larger scale and the ESWC was born. In 2005, Ligarena became Games-Services.

In 2009, ESWC was bought by another French company, Games-Solution, which became the owner of the brand.

In 2012, Oxent, an agency specialising in electronic sports, acquired the ESWC.

The grand finals and masters of ESWC have had a total prize purse of €1,721,000 between 2003 and 2010.

In October 2023, the ESWC brand was acquired by the Esports World Cup Foundation.

== Overview ==
The first Electronic Sports World Cup was held in 2003 with a total of 358 participants from 37 countries and a prize purse of €150,000. To participate in the tournament, competitors had to place in their country's national qualifier. By 2006, the event had grown to 547 qualified participants from 53 countries and had a prize purse of $400,000 US. The event also featured the first competition with a game specifically made for it: TrackMania Nations.

== Championships ==
=== 2003 ===
The 2003 ESWC saw around 150,000 players narrowed down to just 358 players, from 37 different countries, who attended the finals at the Futuroscope near Poitiers in France. The total prize fund for the event was €156,000.

2003	Gold	Silver	Bronze	4th
Counter-Strike	(Sweden) team9	(United States) zEx	(Sweden) SK Gaming*	(France) GoodGame
Warcraft III: Reign of Chaos	(Sweden) Alborz "HeMaN" Haidarian	(Sweden) Fredrik "MaDFroG" Johansson	(France) Antoine "FaTC" Zadri	(France) Yoan "ToD" Merlo
Unreal Tournament 2003	(Germany) Christian "GitzZz" Hoeck	(Sweden) Björn "zulg" Sunesson	(United States) Jonathan "Fatal1ty" Wendell	(United States) Aaron "Lotus" Everitt
Quake 3	(Russia) Anton "Cooller" Singov	(United States) John "ZeRo4" Hill	(Russia) Alexey "LeXeR" Nesterov	(Sweden) Pelle "fazz" Söderman
Counter-Strike Female	(Germany) SK Gaming	(Sweden) Femina Bellica	Denmark Girls	(France) To Hell Angels

- SK Gaming representing Sweden in the Counter-Strike competition

=== 2004 ===
The 2004 finals were once again held at the Futuroscope. Roughly 400 finalists, from 41 countries, attended to compete for a €210,000 prize purse.

2004	Gold	Silver	Bronze	4th
Counter-Strike	(Denmark) Titans	(Sweden) spiXel	(Russia) Virtus.pro	(United States) The Stomping Grounds
Warcraft III: The Frozen Throne	(South Korea) Dae Hui "FoV" Cho	(Sweden) Fredrik "MaDFroG" Johansson	(Sweden) Alborz "HeMaN" Haidarian	(South Korea) Chun "Sweet" Jung Hee
Unreal Tournament 2004	(Germany) Maurice "BurningDeath" Engelhardt	(Germany) Christian "GitzZz" Hoeck	(Netherlands) Laurens "Lauke" Pluijmakers	(Italy) Nicola "Forrest" Geretti
Quake 3	Sweden	United States	Russia	Belarus
Counter-Strike Female	(Denmark) Team all 4 one	(Brazil) Ladies.AMD	(China) New4|eibo	(Sweden) Les Seules
Pro Evolution Soccer 3	(France) Samad "Samsam" Baism	(Germany) Marcel "Xside" Waulke	(China) Chen Zhiliang	(China) Wang Zaoxing
Painkiller	(Netherlands) Sander "Vo0" Kaasjager	(Italy) Alessandro "Stermy" Avallone	(Germany) Michael "Dr.Moerser" Froese	(United States) Jonathan "Fatal1ty" Wendell

=== 2005 ===
In 2005, the venue was moved to a larger facility: The Carrousel du Louvre in Paris. The total prize payout was again raised – this time to €300,000.

2005	Gold	Silver	Bronze	4th
Counter-Strike	(United States) compLexity	(Denmark) SK Gaming*	(Germany) Mousesports	(South Korea) Lunatic-hai
Warcraft III: The Frozen Throne	(Netherlands) Manuel "Grubby" Schenkhuizen	(Russia) Andrey "Deadman" Sobolev	(South Korea) Seo Woo "ReiGn" Kang	(China) Li "Sky" Xiaofeng
Unreal Tournament 2004	(France) Michael "winz" Bignet	(Austria) Markus "Falcon" Holzer	(Netherlands) Laurens "Lauke" Pluijmakers	(Italy) Michele "DevilMC" Esposito
Quake 3	(Russia) Anton "Cooller" Singov	(United States) Paul "czm" Nelson	(Sweden) Magnus "fojji" Olsson	(United States) Jason "socrates" Sylka
Counter-Strike Female	(United States) Girls Got Game	(Brazil) Ladies.AMD	(Spain) x6tence.AMD	(France) Beat off The Best
Pro Evolution Soccer 4	(Saudi Arabia) Badr "ArabianJoker" Hakeem	(Martinique) Mike "Mike" Moreton	(Spain) Raúl "Legre" Alegre	(China) "Zhao_Hang"
Gran Turismo 4	(France) Pierre "Snake" Lenoire	(France) Thibault "Carter" Lacombe	(France) Arnaud "Lucky" Lacombe	(France) Jean-Philippe "Phenicks" Lacombe

*SK-Gaming's, secondary, Danish squad

=== 2006 ===
The 2006 event took place at the Palais omnisports de Paris-Bercy and the total prize payout was approximately €300,000.

2006	Gold	Silver	Bronze	4th
Counter-Strike	Made in Brazil	(Sweden) fnatic	(Germany) aTTaX	(United States) Team3D
Warcraft III: The Frozen Throne	(South Korea) Jae Wook "Lucifer" Noh	(Croatia) Ivica "Zeus[19]" Markovic	(China) Li "Sky" Xiaofeng	(Bulgaria) Zdravko "Insomnia" Georgiev
Quake 4	(France) Michael "winz" Bignet	(Belarus) Alexey "Cypher" Yanushevsky	(Netherlands) Ivo "Forever" Lindhout	(Russia) Anton "Cooller" Singov
Counter-Strike Female	(France) Beat off the Best	(Sweden) Les Seules	(China) Hacker Victory	(Germany) SK Gaming*
Pro Evolution Soccer 5	(France) Bruce "Spank" Grannec	(France) Moustafa "Myto" Menadi	(Belgium) Yasin "Jinxy" Koroglu	(China) Song "Song" Xianzhi
Gran Turismo 4	(France) Pierre "Snake" Lenoire	(France) Thibault "Carter" Lacombe	(France) Arnaud "Lucky" Lacombe	(Australia) Daniel "Holl01" Holland
Trackmania Nations	(France) Dorian "Carl" Vallet	(Austria) Manuel "Baiy000r" Baier	(Germany) Pascal "gaLLo" Jäger	(France) Adrien "Dridrione" Auxent

- SK Gaming representing USA in Counter-Strike female

=== 2007 ===
The 2007 ESWC took place at the Paris expo Porte de Versailles, Paris, from July 5 to July 8. There was a complete expo for this event, called "Mondial du Gaming" (World of Gaming).

750 finalists, from 51 countries, competed for a prize purse of $180,000 US.

2007	Gold	Silver	Bronze	4th
Counter-Strike	(Poland) PGS.PokerStrategy.com	(Denmark) Team NoA	(Sweden) fnatic *	Made in Brazil
Warcraft III: The Frozen Throne	(South Korea) Lee Sung "SoJu" Duk	(Norway) Olav "Creolophus" Undheim	(Netherlands) Manuel "Grubby" Schenkhuizen	(South Korea) Jun "Lyn" Park
Quake 4	(Poland) Maciej "av3k" Krzykowski	(Russia) Anton "Cooller" Singov	(France) Michael "winz" Bignet	(Sweden) Mikael "PURRI" Tarvainen
Counter-Strike Female	(United States) SK Gaming **	(China) EHONOR	(France) Be The Best	(Sweden) Unfinished
Pro Evolution Soccer 6	(Germany) Sven "S-Butcher" Wehmeier	(France) Bruce "Spank" Grannec	(Germany) Mike "El Matador" Linden	(Portugal) Almeida "Bubaloo" Jorge
Trackmania Nations	(Netherlands) Freek "XenoGear" Molema	(France) Dorian "Carl" Vallet	(France) Simon "Lign" Ferreira	(France) Charles "selrahc37" Devillard

=== 2008 ===
Leaving France for the first time, the 2008 Electronic Sports World Cup took place in San Jose, California, USA, from August 25 to August 27 during the bigger "NVISION 08" event. The disciplines announced were: Counter-Strike (open and female), Warcraft III: The Frozen Throne, Trackmania Nations Forever, Defense of the Ancients and, Quake 3. Pro Evolution Soccer was not included because the global Konami authority had not given its support to the competition. The prize purse was approximately $200,000 US.

2008	Gold	Silver	Bronze	4th
Counter-Strike	(Poland) PGS.MYM (NEO, TaZ)	(South Korea) eSTRO	(Sweden) fnatic	(Germany) Mousesports
Warcraft III: The Frozen Throne	(South Korea) Du-Seop "WhO" Chang	(China) Li "Sky" Xiaofeng	(China) Zhuo "TeD" Zeng	(South Korea) Seo Woo "ReiGn" Kang
Quake 3	(Belarus) Alexey "Cypher" Yanushevsky	(Germany) Marcel 'K1llsen' Paul	(United States) Shane "Rapha" Hendrixson	(China) Fan "Jibo" Zhibo
Counter-Strike Female	(United States) SK Gaming	(France) emuLate	(China) EHonor	(Sweden) MeetYourMakers
Trackmania Nations	(Sweden) Kalle "Frostbeule" Moertlund Videkull	(Netherlands) Freek "XenoGear" Molema	(France) Simon "Lign" Ferreira	(France) Dorian "Carl" Vallet
Defense of the Ancients	(Singapore) Zenith	(Malaysia) KingSurf	(Denmark) MeetYourMakers	(United States) Evil Geniuses

==== Masters of Paris ====
In place of the ESWC, the "Masters of Paris" was held from July 4 to July 6, during the "Mondial du Gaming", taking place at the Palais omnisports de Paris-Bercy. The same disciplines took place during this Masters and offered additional qualifying slots for ESWC Grand Final in San Jose. All winners won a slot to participate in the ESWC Grand Final, and hotel accommodation in San Jose, free of charge.

2008 Masters of Paris	Gold	Silver	Bronze	4th
Counter-Strike	(Denmark) Mortal Teamwork	(Sweden) fnatic	(Germany) Mousesports	(Finland) Roccat
Warcraft III: The Frozen Throne	(South Korea) Jae Ho "Moon" Jang	(China) Li "Sky" Xiaofeng	(France) Yoan "ToD" Merlo	(South Korea) Du-Seop "WhO" Chang
Quake 3	(Belarus) Alexey "Cypher" Yanushevsky	(Sweden) Magnus "fox" Olsson	(Poland) Maciej "av3k" Krzykowski	(China) Fan "Jibo" Zhibo
Counter-Strike Female	(Sweden) Les Seules	(United States) SK Gaming	(France) Emulate	(Russia) forZe
Trackmania Nations	(France) Simon "Lign" Ferreira	(Netherlands) Freek "XenoGear" Molema	(Sweden) Kalle "Frostbeule" Mörtlund Videkull	(Portugal) Pedro "Moriah" Benjamin
Defense of the Ancients	(Sweden) SK Gaming	(Romania) The Elder Gods	(Denmark) MeetYourMakers	(United States) Evil Geniuses

==== Masters of Athens ====
"Masters of Athens" was held from October 17 to October 18, 2008, during the Athens Digital Week. Disciplines featured were Quake III and Warcraft III: The Frozen Throne. The tournament had a $30.000 prize purse, and the champion qualified for ESWC 2009.

2008 Masters of Athens	Gold	Silver	Bronze	4th
Warcraft III: The Frozen Throne	(South Korea) June "Lyn" Park	(South Korea) Jae Ho "Moon" Jang	(France) Yoan "ToD" Merlo	(South Korea) Du-Seop "WhO" Chang
Quake 3	(United States) Shane "Rapha" Hendrixson	(Sweden) Sebastian "Spart1e" Siira	(Poland) Maciej "av3k" Krzykowski	(Belarus) Alexey "Cypher" Yanushevsky

=== 2009 ===
==== Masters of Cheonan ====
- Venue: Cheonan, South Korea
- Prize: €54,000
- Date: 2–6 May 2009

2009 Masters of Cheonan	Gold	Silver	Bronze	4th
Counter-Strike	(Sweden) fnatic	(Sweden) SK-Gaming	(Germany) Mousesports	(Norway) Alchemists
Warcraft III: The Frozen Throne	(Spain) Pedro "LucifroN" Moreno Durán	(South Korea) Park "Lyn" June	(China) Lu "Fly100%" Weiliang	(Russia) Dmitriy "Happy" Kostin
StarCraft: Brood War	(United States) Gregory "IdrA" Fields	(Ukraine) Oleksii "White-Ra" Krupnik	(South Korea) Seo "ToSsGirL" Ji-Soo	(China) Zhang"Super" Minglu
Special Force	(South Korea) ITBANK Razer	(South Korea) eSTRO	(South Korea) ITBANK teenager Razer	(China) END
FIFA Online 2	(South Korea) Kim Jung-Min	(South Korea) Lee Woo-Young	(South Korea) Yang Jin-Mo	

=== 2010 ===
The 2010 "Electronic Sports World Cup", which took place at Disneyland Paris, featured a €213,500 prize purse. Games Solution (or DIP-Organisation) took over the ESWC in 2010.

2010	Gold	Silver	Bronze	4th
Counter-Strike	(Ukraine) Natus Vincere	(Sweden) SK Gaming	(Denmark) mortal Team work	(Poland) Frag eXecutors
Warcraft III: The Frozen Throne	(South Korea) June "Lyn" Park	(South Korea) Jae Ho "Moon" Jang	(South Korea) Sung sik "ReMinD" Kim	(Russia) Happy
Quake Live	(United States) Rapha	(Poland) av3k	(Russia) Anton "Cooller" Singov	(United States) Dahang
Counter-Strike Female	(United States) SK Gaming	(Sweden) fnatic	(France) Millenium	(Germany) Mousesports
TrackMania	(Norway) Bergie	(Portugal) Moria	(France) YoYo	(France) Carl
Defense of the Ancients	(China) EHOME	(Russia) DTS	(Denmark) MeetYourMakers	(United States) Nirvana
FIFA 10	(France) Anas "Astank" Sofi	(Brazil) Pires	(Mexico) Andrei	(Portugal) Francisco "Quinzas" Cruz
Need for Speed: Shift	(Netherlands) Steffan	(Germany) Husky	(Germany) Sliver	(Poland) lecho
Super Street Fighter IV	(United States) Justin Wong	(United States) Marn	(France) Olivier "Luffy" Hay	(South Korea) Sun Woo "Infiltration" Lee
Guitar Hero 5	(France) Banobi	(Brazil) CNB.Luckysonic	(United States) vVv Smokyprogg	(South Korea) kyu hwan "TeamTest" Han

=== 2011 ===
This event marked the transitional replacement and additions of several cornerstone tournament titles. This included the replacement of Warcraft III: The Frozen Throne with StarCraft II: Wings of Liberty, as well as the replacement of Defense of the Ancients with Dota 2. Additionally, this event marked the first and only year in which Counter-Strike: Source was present. It was also the last year that would include Counter-Strike 1.6, which was the main attraction of the tournament for many years, and the last remaining game that had been featured in the inaugural ESWC event.

- Date : From October 20 to October 25, 2011
- Venue : Paris Games Week, Porte de Versailles, Paris, France
- Production : Photos | Videos

2011	Gold	Silver	Bronze	4th
StarCraft II: Wings of Liberty	(France) Ilyes "Stephano" Satouri	(Poland) Grzegorz "MaNa" Komincz	(South Korea) Jung-Hoon "MarineKing" Lee	(Netherlands) Manuel "Grubby" Schenkhuizen
Counter-Strike	(Sweden) SK Gaming	(Ukraine) Natus Vincere	(Germany) Mousesports	(Poland) AGAiN
Counter-Strike Female	(United States) UBINITED	(France) Millenium	(Russia) Moscow Five	(Brazil) Gamerhouse
Counter-Strike: Source	(France) Team VeryGames (Ex6TenZ, NBK, RpK, shox, SmithZz)	(Denmark) CKRAS Gaming (3k2, cajun, FeTiSh, h0lm, wantz)	(United States) CheckSix Gaming (DaZeD, frozt, neiL, Steel, tck)	(Canada) Team Dynamic (adreN, ANGER, AZK, Legend, PEX)
TrackMania Forever	(Slovakia) Erik "hakkiJunior" Leštach	(Slovakia) Marek "tween" Pacher	(France) Yoann "YoYo" Cook	(Netherlands) Tim "Spam" Lunenburg
Dota 2	(Ukraine) Natus Vincere	(China) EHOME	(Serbia) GamersLeague	(Denmark) monkeybusiness
FIFA 11	(France) Adrien "Aquino" Viaud	(Spain) Rafael "Ralfitita" Riobó Sánchez	(Portugal) Francisco "Quinzas" Cruz	(Netherlands) Koen "k0entj92" Weijland

=== 2012 ===
- Date : From October 30 to November 4, 2012
- Venue : Paris Games Week, Porte de Versailles, Paris, France
- Official disciplines : Counter-Strike: Global Offensive on PC (5v5), Shootmania Storm on PC (3v3), Call of Duty Black Ops 2 on Xbox 360 (4v4), Dota 2 on PC (5v5), FIFA 14 on Xbox 360 (1v1), Trackmania² Stadium on PC (1v4)
- Production : Photos | Videos

2012	Gold	Silver	Bronze	4th
StarCraft II: Wings of Liberty	(Poland) Grzegorz "MaNa" Komincz	(South Korea) Park "fOrGG" Ji Soo	(France) Ilyes "Stephano" Satouri	(France) Grégory "NeOAnGeL" Ferte
Dota 2	(Ukraine) Natus Vincere	(United States) Team Dignitas	(France) Shiba Gaming	(France) Imaginary Gaming
ShootManiaStorm	(France) Colwn	(Netherlands) Eclypsia	(Germany) GamersLeague	(France) 287
TrackMania Nations Forever	(Netherlands) Tim "Spam" Lunenburg	(Slovakia) Marek "Tween" Pacher	(Canada) Carl-Antoni "CarlJr." Cloutier	(France) Adrien "Ned" Le Berre
FIFA 13	(France) Bruce "Spank" Grannec	(Romania) Ovidiu "Ovvy" Patrascu	(France) Julien "Juliianooo" Dassonville	(Saudi Arabia) Abdulaziz "Alshehri" Alshehri
Tekken Tag Tournament 2	(South Korea) Bae "Knee" Jae Min	(South Korea) Park "Nin" Hyun Kyu	(Indonesia) Leonard "lion art" Y.H	(United Kingdom) Eze "StarScream" Izundu
Counter-Strike: Global Offensive	(Sweden) Ninjas in Pyjamas (Get_Right, f0rest, Xizt, friberg, Fiflaren)	(France) Team VeryGames (Ex6TenZ, NBK, RpK, SmithZz, kennyS)	(United States) Area 51 (DaZeD, sgares, semphis, PineKone, tck)	(Germany) n!faculty (asmo, kirby, smn, disruptor, qk-mantis)
Counter-Strike: Global Offensive Girls	(United States) UBINITED (Ali, jso, potter, missharvey, sapphiRe)	(Germany) Team ALTERNATE (beyoNd, n i c i, kathi, iReNe, zAAz)	(United Kingdom) Reason Gaming (Abiii, Kaat, aNi-, Sephi, Salah)	(France) Imaginary Gaming (AmandiiNe, Cla, Kly, PrincesS, TuEuSee'e)
TrackMania 2: Canyon	(Finland) Kasperi "klovni" Aaltonen	(Germany) Florian "oNio" Roschu	(France) Ludovic "Ludo" Marquet	(France) Côme "Cocow" Marquet

=== 2013 ===
- Date : From October 30 to November 3, 2013
- Venue : Paris Games Week, Porte de Versailles, Paris, France
- Official disciplines : Counter-Strike: Global Offensive on PC (5v5), ShootMania Storm on PC (3v3), Call of Duty: Black Ops 2 on Xbox 360 (4v4), Dota 2 on PC (5v5), FIFA 14 on Xbox 360 (1v1), Trackmania Stadium on PC (1v4)
- Production : Archives | Photos | Videos

Results
	Gold	Silver	Bronze	4th
Call of Duty: Black Ops II	(United States) compLexity	(France) Millenium	(United Kingdom) Epsilon eSports	(United Kingdom) Infused
Counter-Strike: Global Offensive	(France) Clan-Mystik	(France) VeryGames	(Ukraine) Astana Dragons	(Sweden) Ninjas in Pyjamas
Counter-Strike: Global Offensive (women)	(Sweden) Druidz	(Germany) Alternate	(France) Mistral Gaming	(United States) Ubinited
Dota 2	(Russia) Team Empire	(United States) Evil Geniuses	(France) Sigma.int	(Sweden) 4FC
FIFA 14	(France) Vincent "Vinch" Hoffmann	(Russia) Robert "Ufenok77" Fakhretdinov	(Sweden) Ivan 'Boraslegend' Lapanje	(Netherlands) Alban "azzurra" Xhemajli
ShootMania Storm	(France) aAa	(Sweden) Lemondogs	(France) Pyro|Gen	(Sweden) Fnatic
TrackMania 2: Stadium	(Canada) Carl-Antoni "CarlJr." Cloutier	(Germany) TaLa	(Netherlands) Koenz	(Norway) Bergie

=== 2014 ===
- Date : From October 29 to November 2, 2014
- Venue : Paris Games Week, Porte de Versailles, Paris, France
- Official disciplines : Counter-Strike: Global Offensive on PC (5v5), Call of Duty:Ghosts on Xbox One (4v4), Just Dance (video game) on Xbox One (1v1), FIFA 15 on Xbox One (1v1), Trackmania² Stadium on PC (1v4), ShootMania Storm on PC (3v3)
- Production : Archives | Photos | Videos

Results
	Gold	Silver	Bronze	4th
Call of Duty:Ghosts	(United States) Evil Geniuses	(United Kingdom) TCM Gaming	(France) Ascentia Gaming	(France) Team Vitality
Counter-Strike: Global Offensive	(Sweden) Fnatic	(France) Team LDLC	(Poland) Virtus.Pro	(Ukraine) Natus Vincere
Counter-Strike: Global Offensive (women)	(France) 3DMAX	(United States) Team Karma	(Sweden) Bad Monkey gaming	(France) Reason Gaming
FIFA 15	(Iran) Navid "AdamanT" Borhani	(United Kingdom) Sean "Dragonn" Allen	(France) Benfreha "neyo67" Hicham	(Sweden) Ivan 'Boraslegend' Lapanje
Just Dance	(Brazil) Diego "Diegho.san" Dos Santos	(Brazil) Tulio "Tulioakar96" Furst Akar	(France) Amandine "Dina" Morisset	(Brazil) elvin "Jaeder" Da Rocha Santos
ShootMania Storm	(France) Aera eSport	(France) aAa	(Sweden) Awsomniac	(United Kingdom) FM eSports
TrackMania 2: Stadium	(Canada) Carl-Antoni "CarlJr." Cloutier	(Slovakia) tween	(France) YoYo	(Netherlands) Spam

=== 2015 ===
==== ESWC 2015 COD ====
- Date : May 2–3, 2015
- Venue : Zenith-Paris, Paris, France
- Official disciplines : Call of Duty: Advanced Warfare on Xbox One (4v4)

Results
	Gold	Silver	T3rd	T3rd
Call of Duty: Advanced Warfare	(United States) OpTic Gaming	(United States) Denial eSports	(United States) Revenge Gaming	(United Kingdom) Vitality Storm

==== ESWC 2015 CSGO ====
- Date : From July 9 to July 12, 2015
- Venue : Mondial des Jeux Loto Québec, Montreal, Quebec
- Official disciplines : Counter-Strike: Global Offensive on PC (5v5)

Results
	Gold	Silver	T3rd	T3rd
Counter Strike: Global Offensive	(Ukraine) Natus Vincere	(United States) Cloud9	(France) Team EnVyUs	(Ukraine) FlipSid3 Tactics
Counter Strike: Global Offensive (female)	(United States) Counter Logic Gaming Red	(Sweden) Games4u.se Female	(United States) Team Karma	(France) Team Acer.fe

==== 2015 PGW ====
- Date : From October 28 to November 1, 2015
- Venue : Paris Games Week, Porte de Versailles, Paris, France
- Official disciplines : Counter Strike: Global Offensive on PC (5vs5), FIFA 16, League of legends on PC (5vs5), Just Dance, Trackmania² Stadium on PC (1v4), ShootMania Storm on PC (3v3)

Results
	Gold	Silver	T3rd	T3rd
FIFA 16	(Denmark) August "Agge" Rosenmeier	(United Kingdom) Spencer "HugeGorilla" Ealing	(Germany) Erhan "DrErhano" Kayman	(Iran) Kiarash "Immortal" Shokouhisolgi
League of Legends (female)	(France) unKnights Ladies	(France) GG Call Nash	(Norway) BX3 EK	(France) Lamasticrew
Trackmania 2 Stadium	(Canada) Carl-Antoni "CarlJr." Cloutier	(United Kingdom) Thomas "Pac" Cole	(Slovakia) Marek "Tween" Pacher	(Netherlands) Tim "Spam" Lunenburg
Just Dance	(Brazil) Diegho	(France) Dina	(Brazil) Kelvin	(Germany) Lucktose
Trackmania VR	(Germany) Hans "Racehans" Pausch	(France) Yoann "YoYo" Cook	(France) Yoann "YoYo" Cook	(Netherlands) Koen "Koenz" Schobbers

=== 2016 ===
- 1st $20,000 2,500 OpTic Gaming
- 2nd $10,000 1,500 Splyce
- 3rd $6,000 1,100 Rise Nation
- 4th $4,000 900 Millenium

=== 2017 ===
==== Esports World Convention Summer 2017 ====
Esports World Convention Summer 2017 is an offline French CR tournament organized by ESWC.

==== eSports World Convention 2017 ====
eSports World Convention 2017 is an offline French qc tournament.

=== 2018 ===
==== ESWC Metz 2018 ====
ESWC Metz 2018 is an offline event in Metz, France. This tournament will be part of the Open Tour France 2018.

==== eSports World Convention 2018 ====
The Esports World Convention (ESWC) 2018 was held at Paris Games Week (PGW) from October 26 to 30, 2018, at the Paris Expo Porte de Versailles. ESWC hosted various esports competitions, with the main stage showcasing esports culture in France. The event featured qualifiers, a group stage, and a playoff bracket, with the main attraction being the top players in the world.

==== ESWC Africa 2018 ====
ESWC Africa 2018 is an offline Moroccan CS:GO tournament organized by ESWC.

== Medal tally ==
Throughout the ESWC finals the medal tally is as follows (as of ESWC 2014):

#	Countries	Gold	Silver	Bronze	Total
1	France	23	14	25	62
2	United States	13	9	8	30
3	Sweden	12	14	9	35
4	South Korea	10	8	4	22
5	Poland	5	3	3	11
6	Netherlands	5	2	5	12
7	Germany	4	8	10	22
8	Ukraine	4	3	1	8
9	Russia	3	4	6	13
10	Denmark	3	4	5	12
11	Brazil	2	5	0	7
12	Slovakia	2	5	0	7
13	Belarus	2	1	0	3
14	Canada	2	0	1	3
15	China	1	5	7	13
16	Spain	1	2	2	5
17	Norway	1	1	0	2
18	Saudi Arabia	1	0	0	1
19	Singapore	1	0	0	1
20	Finland	1	0	0	1
21	Iran	1	0	0	1
22	United Kingdom	0	2	2	4
23	Austria	0	2	0	2
24	Romania	0	2	0	2
25	Portugal	0	1	2	3
26	Italy	0	1	0	1
27	Croatia	0	1	0	1
28	Malaysia	0	1	0	1
29	Indonesia	0	0	2	2
30	Serbia	0	0	2	2
31	Belgium	0	0	1	1
32	Mexico	0	0	1	1

Pluisje FC

Tournaments rolled out by sistercompany-an event series spanning Europe. that also features other games. for example online club Pluisje FC a historical example of this is the club won

- 5x elite III in a row,
- 1x super cup,
- 4x Elite II in a row
- 66x win FUT Draft 1x 9 in a row (without conceding any goals)

== Official Media Partners ==
- Cadred.org
- ESEA News
