= Red Stone =

2004 video game

- Developers: L&K Logic Korea
- Publishers: GamenGame, GameOn, L&K Logic Korea
- Platforms: Windows Vista; Windows 7; Windows 8; Windows 10
- Release: 2004 (Korean and Japanese Release), 2007 (USA Release), June 2010 (USA Re-Release), November 2014 (Global Launch)
- Genres: Fantasy; MMORPG
- Mode: MMO

Red Stone (Korean: 붉은보석) is a 2D massively multiplayer online role-playing game (MMORPG) developed by L&K Logic Korea.

== Story ==
The story of Red Stone begins in the fantasy world of Prandel as players go on an adventurous quest to search for a mystical red stone that fell from heaven. At the end of the story, the player may choose to give the red stone in exchange for rewards to one of Prandel's factions, such as the Red Devil, or the Underworld or Heaven, who seek to use the power of the Red Stone for their own gain.

== Synopsis ==
When the information about Red stone was first released, The game was supposed to be a single-player RPG that the player should choose one of several characters and be proceeded with the story. And then there was no news for a while, and then all of sudden, it was released as Online MMORPG game which had almost different concept from what it was at the first place. However, back in the time when it was being developed as a single-player game, the characteristics of the game such as the transformation system were already established. The game that came out with its unique catchphrase called Transformation RPG. In fact, players were highly excited when its transformation system was released, but what came out of it was the slow-paced 2D game such as Lineage (video game). In result, many people left. However, the transformation system itself was novel and there were quite a lot strategies for it.

== Gameplay ==
Red stone features the combat between the player and the monster using various skills along with the transformation system. It has two classes for each character at the same time. Converting a class is called in-game term "transformation" or "weapon conversion". Classes that transform include Magician / Werewolf, Priest / Fallen Angel, Necromancer / Devil, Princess / Little witch, Maid / Demon sorceress, and Musketeer / Alchemist . The rest are weapon conversion classes. The reason for distinguishing between transformation and weapon conversion is that the class conversion method is different. It is necessary for both transformation and weapon conversion to learn one or more of the skill of the job to be replaced, but in the case of transformation, the cost of converting the class requires 15 CP. Also, if the CP becomes negative during transformation, the transformation is cancelled.

== Development and release ==
Red Stone was developed by L&K Logic Korea. It officially launched on January 8, 2004.

In March 2025, L&K Logic Korea announced Project Reload, a major update that will implement numerous improvements to the balance, graphics and other departments.

== Nintendo DS and Nintendo 3DS adaptation ==
Red Stone DS: Akaki Ishi ni Michibikareshi Monotachi
- Developers: L&K Logic Korea
- Publisher: GameOn
- Platform: Nintendo DS
- Release: JP: May 26, 2011
- Genre: Action RPG
- Mode: Single-player

Red Stone DS: Akaki Ishi ni Michibikareshi Monotachi (RED STONE DS 〜赤き意志に導かれし者たち〜, Red Stone DS: The Those Ones who are Led by the Red Stone) is a singleplayer only adaptation for the Nintendo DS and Nintendo 3DS released only in Japan. It features exclusive dungeons not available in the original game.

== Sequel ==
A sequel titled Red Stone 2 was released for Android and iOS on 29 September 2016.
