= Carom3D =

1999 video game

Carom 3D
- Carom 3D
- Developer: Comworm Student
- Publisher: Neoact
- Platform: Windows
- Release: 1999
- Genre: Sports simulation – pool
- Modes: Single-player, Multiplayer

Carom 3D was a 1999 freeware online sports simulation video game released by Neoact in 1999. Initially developed as a school project of a Korean student known as Comworm, it is a multiplayer online simulation of pool and billiards.

== Overview ==
Carom 3D is at least in part an accurate simulation of eight-ball, nine-ball, rotation pool, three-ball, four-ball and original six-ball. The game can be played in two different modes: first-person 3D perspective and fixed overhead view.

Until 2005 it was freeware. It progressively became a free-to-play game with bonus items (cues, custom 3D character and profile, participation to daily tournaments) sold from 1 to US$5.

The main aspect of Carom 3D is online confrontation with players from all over the world. Winning allows a player to get a better cue needed to perform high strength and full spin shots. Spinning, as in real life pool and billiards, takes an important role in Carom 3D, specially in pocketless games where most shots are not even possible without a deep knowledge of pool physics and spinning.

== Closure of the server ==
From 2005 to 2010 more than one thousand users were playing at the same time every day on the Neoact servers, but the number of online players then decreased due to the lack of updates and Neoact focusing on other games (Astronest, Texas Hold'em, Fantasy Masters, Pokermania). At the end of 2013, Neoact closed its servers and gameplay ended.

== Esports ==
Carom3D has been one of the games featured at the World Cyber Games in 2007, 2009 and 2010.
