= World Cyber Games =

International video game esport event

- Status: Active
- Genre: Esports
- Frequency: Annual
- Inaugurated: 2000
- Website: wcg.lvup.gg

The World Cyber Games (WCG) is an international esports competition with multi-game titles in which hundreds of esports athletes from around the world participate in a variety of competitions also known as Esports Olympics. WCG events attempt to emulate a traditional sporting tournament, such as the Olympic Games; events included an official opening ceremony, and players from various countries competing for gold, silver, and bronze medals. WCG are held every year in cities around the world. The WCG 2020 competition received nearly 650 million views worldwide.

== General ==
World Cyber Games is one of the largest global esports tournaments, with divisions in various countries. The World Cyber Games, created by International Cyber Marketing CEO Yoosup Oh and backed financially by Samsung, was considered the e-sports Olympics; events included an official opening ceremony, and players from various countries competing for gold, silver and bronze medals. The organization itself had an official mascot, and used an Olympic Games inspired logo. Organizations from each participating country conducted preliminary events at a regional level, before conducting national finals to determine the players best suited to represent them in the main World Cyber Games tournament event. All events had areas for spectators, but the tournament could also be viewed over internet video streams.

Besides providing a platform for tournament gaming, the World Cyber Games was used as a marketing tool; sponsors, such as Samsung, using the space around the venue to set up product demonstrations and stalls. In addition, advertisers saw the event as a good means to reach young male audiences, who may not be exposed to traditional advertising streams via television.

== History ==
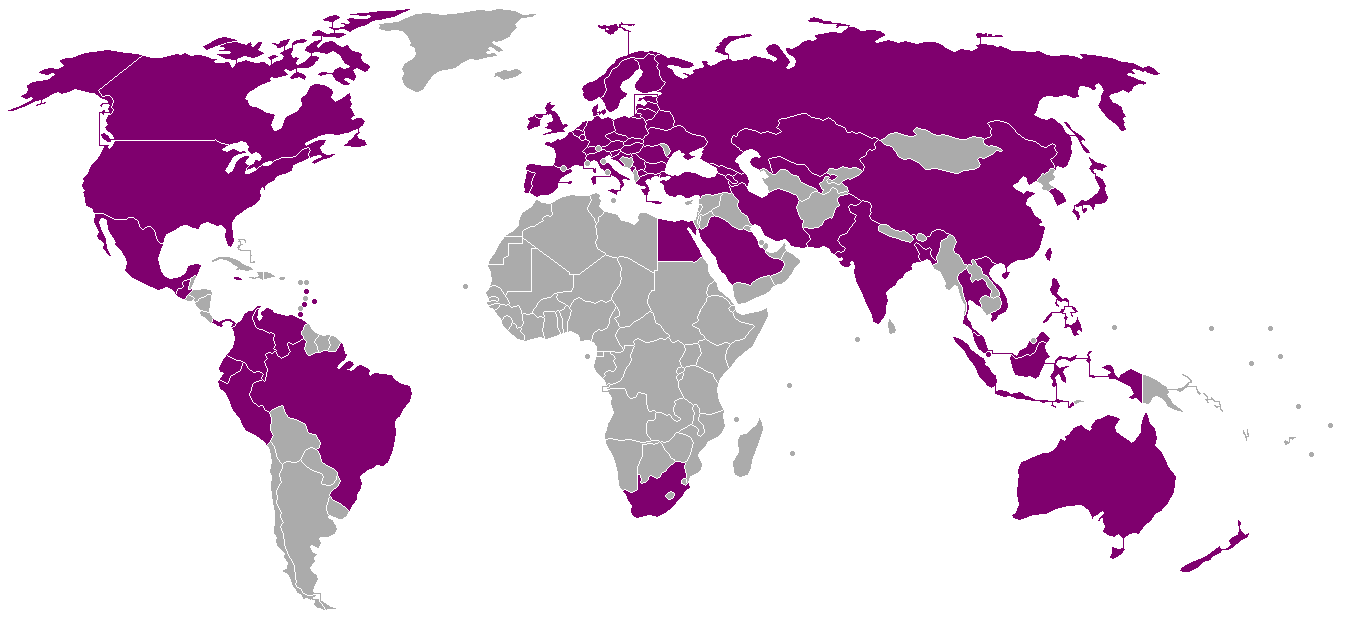
Map of countries participating in the WCG

In 2000, the World Cyber Games was formed, and an event was held titled "The World Cyber Game Challenge", which began with an opening ceremony on 7 October. The event was sponsored by the Republic of Korea's Ministry of Culture and Tourism, Ministry of Information and Communications, and Samsung. It brought together teams from 17 countries to compete against each other in PC games including Quake III Arena, FIFA 2000, Age of Empires II, and StarCraft: Brood War. The tournament ended on 15 October 2000. The competition initially had 174 competitors from 17 different countries with a total prize purse of $200,000.

In 2001, the World Cyber Games held their first main event, hosted in Seoul, Korea, with a prize pool of $300,000 USD. National preliminaries were held between March and September, with the main tournament running between 5 December to 9 December. The World Cyber Games quoted an attendance of 389,000 competitors in the preliminaries, with 430 players advancing to the final tournament; teams from 24 countries in total were involved in the tournament.

In 2002, the World Cyber Games held a larger event in Daejeon, Korea with a prize pool of US$1,300,000; 450,000 competitors took part in the preliminary events, with 450 ultimately making it through to the final tournament. The 2003 tournament, which took place in Seoul again, saw an even bigger prize pool of US$2,000,000, and was the first World Cyber Games tournament to feature a console based competition, with the game Halo: Combat Evolved on the Xbox.

In 2004, the World Cyber Games held a tournament in San Francisco, California, United States, the first tournament outside of its home country. At this stage, the prize pool was at US$2,500,000; with 642 players competing in the grand final. The tournament has since been hosted in various countries around the world; including Singapore in 2005 and Monza, Italy in 2006 - at this time Microsoft became a major sponsor to the event, who would provide software and hardware for all the events through to 2008. In addition, all games played at the tournament would be based exclusively on Windows PC's or the Xbox console.

In 2006, the prize purse had risen to $462,000, and the event had grown to 9 different competitions and 700 qualified participants from 70 different countries.

In 2007, the event was hosted in Seattle, Washington, United States, with a total prize pool of US$4,000,000. In 2008, the tournament was hosted in Cologne, Germany; it was the first World Cyber Games tournament to incorporate a mobile-game based tournament, with Asphalt 4: Elite Racing, In 2009, the tournament was held in Chengdu, China, and featured a special promotion of the game Dungeon & Fighter. The tournament was also coincided to run alongside the World Cyber Games debut reality television show, WCG Ultimate Gamer. Season 2 of WCG Ultimate Gamer was aired between August and October 2010.

In 2014 February, the CEO Brad Lee announced the closing of WCG. Several partners described difficulty working with the CEO and the organization.

In March 2017, the former Samsung owned WCG Trademark was transferred to Korean Publisher Smilegate. Plans to develop the WCG "into the world's top digital entertainment festival in the future". World Cyber Games 2018 should have been hosted in Bangkok on April 26–29, 2018, but was cancelled subsequently. World Cyber Games 2019 was hosted in Xi'an, China on July 18–21, 2019. The WCG 2020 competition received nearly 650 million views worldwide.

=== World Cyber Game tournaments ===
Event	Date	Total prize (USD)	Host location	Participants	Countries	Games offered
WCG Challenge	October 7 – 15, 2000	$200,000	Everland, Yongin, South Korea	174	17	Age of Empires II; FIFA 2000; Quake III Arena; StarCraft: Brood War; Unreal Tournament
WCG 2001	December 5 – 9, 2001	$300,000	COEX Convention & Exhibition Center, Seoul, South Korea	430	37	Age of Empires II; Counter-Strike; FIFA 2001; Quake III Arena; StarCraft: Brood War; Unreal Tournament
WCG 2002	October 28 – November 3, 2002	$300,000	Expo Science Park, Daejeon, South Korea	462	45	2002 FIFA World Cup; Age of Empires II; Counter-Strike; Quake III Arena; StarCraft: Brood War; Unreal Tournament
WCG 2003	October 12 – 18, 2003	$350,000	Olympic Park, Seoul, South Korea	562	55	Age of Mythology; Counter-Strike; FIFA 2003; Halo; StarCraft: Brood War; Unreal Tournament 2003; Warcraft III
WCG 2004	October 6 – 10, 2004	$400,000	San Francisco, California, United States	642	63	Counter-Strike: Condition Zero; FIFA Football 2004; Halo; Need for Speed: Underground; Project Gotham Racing 2; StarCraft: Brood War; Unreal Tournament 2004; Warcraft III: The Frozen Throne
WCG 2005	November 16 – 20, 2005	$435,000	Suntec City, Singapore	679	67	Counter-Strike: Source; Dead or Alive Ultimate; FIFA Football 2005; Halo 2; Need for Speed: Underground 2; StarCraft: Brood War; Warcraft III: The Frozen Throne; Warhammer 40,000: Dawn of War
WCG 2006	October 18 – 22, 2006	$462,000	Monza, Italy	700	70	Counter-Strike 1.6; Dead or Alive 4; FIFA 06; Need for Speed: Most Wanted; Project Gotham Racing 3; Quake 4; StarCraft: Brood War; Warcraft III: The Frozen Throne; Warhammer 40,000: Winter Assault
WCG 2007	October 3 – 7, 2007	$448,000	Seattle, Washington, United States	700	75	Age of Empires III: The Warchiefs (1v1) – (PC); Carom3D (1v1) – (PC); Command & Conquer 3: Tiberium Wars (1v1) – (PC); Counter-Strike 1.6 (5v5) – (PC); Dead or Alive 4 (1v1) – (Xbox 360); FIFA 07 (1v1) – (PC); Gears of War (4v4) – (Xbox 360); Need for Speed: Carbon (1v1) – (PC); Project Gotham Racing 3 (1v1) – (Xbox 360); StarCraft: Brood War (1v1) – (PC); Tony Hawk's Project 8 (1v1) – (Xbox 360); Warcraft III: The Frozen Throne (1v1) – (PC)
WCG 2008	November 5 – 9, 2008	$470,000	Cologne, Germany	800	78	Age of Empires III: The Asian Dynasties (1v1) – (PC); Asphalt 4 (1v1) – (Mobile); Carom3D (1v1) – (PC); Command & Conquer 3: Kane's Wrath (1v1) –(PC); Counter-Strike 1.6 (5v5) – (PC); FIFA 08 (1v1) – (PC); Guitar Hero 3 (1v1) – (Xbox 360); Halo 3 (4v4) – (Xbox 360); Need for Speed: ProStreet (1v1) –(PC); Project Gotham Racing 4(1v1) – (Xbox 360); Red Stone (2v2) – (PC); StarCraft: Brood War (1v1) – (PC); Warcraft III: The Frozen Throne (1v1) – (PC); Virtua Fighter 5 (1v1) – (Xbox 360)
WCG 2009	November 11 – 15, 2009	$500,000	Chengdu, Sichuan, China	600	65	Asphalt 4 (1v1) – (Mobile); Carom3D (1v1) – (PC); Counter-Strike 1.6 (5v5) – (PC); Dungeon & Fighter – (PC) (Promo Game); FIFA 09 (1v1) – (PC); Guitar Hero: World Tour (1v1) – (Xbox 360); Red Stone (4v4) – (PC); StarCraft: Brood War (1v1) – (PC); TrackMania Nations Forever (1v1) – (PC); Virtua Fighter 5 (1v1) – (Xbox 360); Warcraft III: The Frozen Throne (1v1) – (PC); Wise Star 2 (1v1) – (Mobile)
WCG 2010	September 30 – October 3, 2010	$250,000	Los Angeles, California, United States	450	58	Asphalt 5; Carom 3D; Counter-Strike 1.6; FIFA 10; Guitar Hero 5; Forza Motorsport 3; League of Legends; Lost Saga; StarCraft: Brood War; Tekken 6; TrackMania Nations Forever; Warcraft III: The Frozen Throne
WCG 2011	December 8 – 11, 2011	$303,000	Busan, South Korea	600	60	Asphalt 6: Adrenaline; Counter-Strike 1.6; Crossfire (by Smile Gate); FIFA 11; League of Legends; Special Force (by Dragonfly) (Soldier Front in United States); StarCraft II: Wings of Liberty; Tekken 6; Warcraft III: The Frozen Throne; World of Warcraft: Cataclysm
WCG 2012	November 29 – December 2, 2012	$258,000	Kunshan, China	500	40	Crossfire; Dota 2; StarCraft II: Wings of Liberty; Warcraft III: The Frozen Throne; FIFA 12; Counter-Strike Online; Defense of the Ancients; QQ Speed; World of Tanks
WCG 2013	November 28 – December 1, 2013	$306,000	Kunshan, China	500	38	Crossfire; Super Street Fighter IV: Arcade Edition Ver. 2012; League of Legends; StarCraft II: Heart of the Swarm; Warcraft III: The Frozen Throne; FIFA 14; Assault Fire; QQ Speed; World of Tanks
2014-2018 : Not held						
WCG 2019	July 18 – 21, 2019	$612,500	Xi'an, China	506	34	Dota 2; Honor of Kings; Clash Royale; Warcraft III: The Frozen Throne; Hearthstone; Crossfire; StarCraft II: Legacy of the Void
WCG 2020	September 7 – November 8, 2020	$285,000	ONLINE (Shanghai, China / Seoul, South Korea)	-	-	Crossfire; Warcraft III: Reforged; Honor of Kings; FIFA Online 4
2021-2022 : Not held						
WCG 2023	July 28–30, 2023	-	Busan, South Korea	-	-	Mobile Legends: Bang Bang; Clash Royale; Hearthstone; Valorant; Genshin Impact
WCG 2024	August 31 – September 1, 2024	-	Jakarta, Indonesia	-	-	Mobile Legends: Bang Bang; Tekken 8; Street Fighter 6; Valorant; Crossfire
2025- : Not held						
