= List of Cyberathlete Professional League champions =

This list shows previous winners of various events and tournaments held by Cyberathlete Professional League since its foundation in 1997.

== Aliens versus Predator 2 ==
- 2001 - CPL World Championship Event: (United States) Johnathan 'Fatal1ty' Wendel (Fatal1ty)
- 2002 - CPL Belkin Nostromo: (United States) Dan 'RiX' Hammans

== Call of Duty ==
- 2004 - Cyberathlete Extreme Summer Championships: (United States) United 5

Jacob "NightFaLL" Stanton, Jon "Platinum" Byrne, Tim "FireBlade" Lobes, Daniel "D.Garza" Garza, Rusty "in$ight" Kuperberg and Chris "47" Maglio.

== Counter-Strike ==
2000 CPL America
2000 Mar 4 - 5	(United States) Dallas	Just One Bullet	X3	TAU
		(Brazil) bloodwynd	(United States) BigDog	(United States) Beavis007
		(Brazil) manXa	(United States) Bullseye	(United States) Da_Bears
		(Germany) alemaoital	(United States) Ksharp	(United States) Warden
		(Brazil) toNho	(United States) Rambo	(Canada) shaGuar
		(Brazil) blindx	(United States) Moto	(United States) Scarface

2000 CPL Europe Cologne
2000 Dec 8 - 10	(Germany) Cologne	Clan Z	Spirit of Amiga	mortal Teamwork
		(Finland) Fukush	(Denmark) CrashJack	(Germany) Cracken
		(Finland) Gdigga	(Norway) XeqtR	(Germany) NyKoN
		(Finland) Muranen	(Denmark) Jackieboy	(Germany) Scorp
		(Finland) neutron	(Denmark) Majestic	(Germany) speiky
		(Finland) Zibbo	(Denmark) Attermann	(Germany) Wirsing

Babbage's CPL Event
2000 Dec 14 - 17	(United States) Dallas	Ninjas in Pyjamas	Domain of Pain	mortal Teamwork
		(Sweden) cogline	(United States) Atro	(Germany) Cracken
		(Sweden) Hyb	(United States) Phyta	(Germany) NyKoN
		(Sweden) litzer	(United States) Scarface	(Germany) Scorp
		(Sweden) Medion	(United States) Riptide	(Germany) speiky
		(Sweden) Potti	(United States) Sneaky	(Germany) Wirsing
			(United States) Trigga	

Speakeasy's CPL Event
2001 Apr 12 - 15	(United States) Dallas	X3 Blue	xeno	mortal Teamwork
		(United States) BigDog	(Canada) crow	(Denmark) AttermanN
		(United States) Bullseye	(Canada) george	(Denmark) CrashJack
		(United States) Ksharp	(Canada) gusto	(Denmark) JackieBoy
		(United States) Moto	(Canada) reek	(Denmark) Majestic
		(United States) Rambo	(Canada) wISeGUy	(Denmark) VicoN
		(United States) Trics	(Canada) crow	(Denmark) Krewl

2001 CPL Europe Holland
2001 May 11–13	(Netherlands) Loosdrecht	Spirit of Amiga	Allstars	Clan Z
		(Sweden) HeatoN	(Denmark) JackieBoy	(Finland)
		(Sweden) Hyb	(Denmark) Majestic	(Finland)
		(Sweden) Medion	(Sweden) Potti	(Finland)
		(Sweden) trance	(Denmark) VicoN	(Finland)
		(Sweden) vesslan	(Norway) XeqtR	(Finland)

2001 CPL Europe London
2001 Aug 3–5	(United Kingdom) London	Ninjas in Pyjamas	armaTeam	GameOnline
		(Sweden) HeatoN	(France) Mkl	(Sweden) ahl
		(Sweden) Hyb	(France)	(Sweden) GoZie
		(Sweden) Medion	(France)	(Sweden) Mson
		(Sweden) Potti	(France)	(Sweden) sMURFAh
		(Norway) XeqtR	(France)	(Sweden) Souledge

2001 CPL Europe Berlin
2001	(Germany) Berlin	Ninjas in Pyjamas	Spirit of Amiga	armaTeam
		(Sweden) HeatoN	(Denmark) Afflictor	(France) Mkl
		(Sweden) Hyb	(Denmark) Bitch	(France)
		(Sweden) Medion	(Denmark) Muggz	(France)
		(Sweden) Potti	(Denmark) Nituz	(France)
		(Norway) XeqtR	(Denmark) Zargoth	(France)

2001 CPL Winter Championship
2001 Dec 5 - 9	(United States) Dallas	Ninjas in Pyjamas	Xtreme 3	Mortal Teamwork
		(Sweden) ahl	(United States) BigDog	(Sweden) Gozie
		(Sweden) HeatoN	(United States) Bullseye	(Sweden) Notorious
		(Sweden) Hyb	(United States) Chameleon	(Sweden) sMURFAh
		(Sweden) Medion	(United States) Ksharp	(Sweden) Souledge
		(Sweden) Potti	(United States) Rambo	(Norway) XeqtR
		(Sweden) vesslan	(United States) Trics	

2002 CPL Europe Cologne
2002 May 17–19	(Germany) Cologne	Nordic Division	against All authority	Schroet Kommando
		(Norway) DarK	(France) bisou	(Denmark) Attermann
		(Sweden) swift	(France) Emkill	(Sweden) Blue
		(Sweden) telsek	(Vietnam) kyo	(Sweden) NIRee
		(Sweden) trance	(France) Louen	(Denmark) VicoN
		(Sweden) vesslan	(France) Maarek	(Sweden) Xenon
		(Norway) XeqtR	(France) r0nan	

2002 CPL Summer Championship
2002 Jul 20 - 24	(United States) Dallas	Schroet Kommando	GameOnline	eSports United
		(Norway) DarK	(Norway) elemeNt	(Sweden) ahl
		(Sweden) HeatoN	(Sweden) GoZie	(Sweden) brunk
		(Sweden) Potti	(Sweden) Hyb	(Sweden) Notorious
		(Sweden) Xenon	(Sweden) Mson	(Sweden) ScreaM
		(Norway) XeqtR	(Sweden) Souledge	(Sweden) Swift
				(Sweden) vesslan

2002 CPL Europe Oslo
2002 Oct 3 - 6	(Norway) Oslo	eoLithic	mortal Teamwork	mousesports
		(Norway) elemeNt	(Sweden) ahl	(Germany) Chris P.
		(Norway) Damien	(Sweden) brunk	(Germany) Johnny R
		(Norway) knoxville	(Sweden) filur	(Germany) Nils K.
		(Norway) Luke	(Sweden) fisker	(Germany) Roman R.
		(Norway) Naikon	(Sweden) ScreaM	(Germany) Sebastian S.

2002 CPL Winter Championship
2002 Dec 18 - 22	(United States) Dallas	Team 3D	GameOnline	Schroet Kommando
		(United States) Bullseye	(Norway) elemeNt	(Sweden) Bengan
		(United States) Kane	(Sweden) hyb	(Sweden) brunk
		(United States) Ksharp	(Finland) myssE	(Sweden) HeatoN
		(United States) Moto	(Sweden) Souledge	(Sweden) Medion
		(United States) Rambo	(Denmark) VicoN	(Sweden) Potti
		(Canada) Steel		

2003 CPL Europe Cannes
2003 Mar 14 - 16	(France) Cannes	Schroet Kommando	Team 9	mousesports
		(Sweden) ahl	(Sweden) Lucchese	(Austria) gore
		(Sweden) brunk	(Sweden) Luciano	(Germany) impi
		(Sweden) fisker	(Sweden) quick	(Germany) Johnny R
		(Sweden) HeatoN	(Sweden) Venom	(Germany) Nils K.
		(Sweden) Potti	(Sweden) vesslan	(Germany) Roman R.

2003 CPL Summer Championship
2003 Jul 30 - Aug 3	(United States) Dallas	Schroet Kommando	Team 9	Team 3D
		(Sweden) ahl	(Sweden) Lucchese	(United States) Bullseye
		(Norway) elemeNt	(Sweden) Luciano	(United States) Ksharp
		(Sweden) fisker	(Sweden) vesslan	(United States) moto
		(Sweden) HeatoN	(Sweden) quick	(United States) Rambo
		(Sweden) Potti	(Norway) XeqtR	(Canada) steel

2003 CPL Europe Copenhagen
2003 Nov 13 - 16	(Denmark) Copenhagen	Schroet Kommando	Gamepoint	mousesports
		(Sweden) ahl	(Sweden) archie	(Germany) Blizzard
		(Sweden) fisker	(Sweden) Crw	(Austria) gore
		(Sweden) HeatoN	(Sweden) GudeN	(Germany) Johnny R
		(Sweden) Potti	(Sweden) Hyper	(Germany) neo
		(Sweden) SpawN	(Sweden) vilden	(Germany) Roman R.

2003 CPL Winter Championship
2003 Dec 16 - 20	(United States) Dallas	Schroet Kommando	Team NoA	mousesports
		(Sweden) ahl	(Norway) bsl	(Germany) Blizzard
		(Norway) elemeNt	(Norway) knoxville	(Austria) gore
		(Sweden) fisker	(United States) method	(Germany) Johnny R
		(Sweden) HeatoN	(Norway) Naikon	(Germany) neo
		(Sweden) Potti	(Canada) shaGuar	(Germany) Roman R.
		(Sweden) SpawN		

2004 CPL Summer Championship
2004 Jul 28 - Aug 1	(United States) Dallas	Eyeballers	Schroet Kommando	Rival
		(Sweden) archie	(Sweden) ahl	(United States) exodus
		(Sweden) GudeN	(Sweden) fisker	(United States) kaM
		(Sweden) Hyper	(Sweden) HeatoN	(United States) masternook
		(Sweden) IsKall	(Sweden) Potti	(United States) medias
		(Sweden) vilden	(Sweden) SpawN	(United States) Ph33R

2004 CPL Winter Championship
2004 Dec 15 - 19	(United States) Dallas	Team NoA	Eyeballers	Gamer Company
		(Norway) elemeNt	(Sweden) archie	(United States) exodus
		(United States) method	(Sweden) bullen	(United States) kaM
		(Norway) Naikon	(Sweden) GudeN	(United States) masternook
		(Canada) shaGuar	(Sweden) vilden	(United States) medias
		(Norway) XeqtR	(Sweden) walle	(United States) Ph33R

2005 CPL Summer Championship
2004 Jul 28 - Aug 1	(United States) Dallas	Schroet Kommando	Evil Geniuses	Gamer Company
		(Sweden) ahl	(Canada) bl00dsh0t	(United States) hanes
		(Sweden) fisker	(Canada) blackpanther	(United States) masternook
		(Sweden) Snajdan	(Canada) In Flames	(United States) medias
		(Sweden) SpawN	(Canada) Alex Cai	(United States) method
		(Sweden) vilden	(Canada) shaGuar	(United States) Ph33R

2005 CPL Winter Championship
2005 Dec 14 - 18	(United States) Dallas	Schroet Kommando	Lunatic Hai	JaX Money Crew
		(Sweden) ahl	(South Korea) bebe	(United States) da bears
		(Sweden) fisker	(South Korea) cliper	(Canada) evaN
		(Sweden) Snajdan	(South Korea) enemy	(Canada) Royle
		(Sweden) SpawN	(South Korea) mal	(United States) sm0og1er
		(Sweden) vilden	(South Korea) rishNarchK	(United States) zid

2006 Intel Summer Championship
2006 Jul 5 - 9	(United States) Dallas	compLexity	Alternate aTTaX	fnatic
		(United States) fRoD	(Germany) CHEF-KOCH	(Sweden) Archi
		(United States) Storm	(Germany) Kapio	(Sweden) cArn
		(United States) sunman	(Germany) mooN	(Sweden) dsn
		(United States) tr1p	(Germany) silver	(Sweden) f0rest
		(United States) Warden	(Germany) Tixo	(Sweden) Tentpole

2006 CPL Winter Championship
2006 Dec 16 - 20	(United States) Dallas	fnatic	Meet Your Makers	Pentagram
		(Sweden) Archi	(Norway) elemeNt	(Poland) kuben
		(Sweden) cArn	(Norway) juven9le	(Poland) Loord
		(Sweden) dsn	(Norway) prb	(Poland) LUq
		(Sweden) f0rest	(Norway) REAL	(Poland) Neo
		(Sweden) Tentpole	(Norway) Xione	(Poland) TaZ

2007 CPL Winter Championship
2007 Dec 19 - 22	(United States) Dallas	X3O	Mug N Mouse	PhrenetiK
		(United States) goodfornothing	(United States) dboorn	(United States) amico
		(United States) impulsive	(United States) gosu	(United States) cfx
		(United States) mehLer	(United States) MuMiX	(United States) Ph33R
		(United States) n0thing	(United States) punkvillE	(United States) sinyster
		(United States) PaTyoJoN	(United States) tmo	(United States) xpt
^{Because of the G7 boycott and various reasons, only ten teams attended the tournament. Making it the smallest open tournament and the first worldwide tournament without any Scandinavian teams in both the tournament and the top three.}

== Counter-Strike: Source ==
- 2005 - Cyberathlete Extreme Summer Championships: (United States) PowersGaming
- 2007 - Cyberathlete Extreme Summer Championships: (United States) TeamPandemic
- 2007 - Cyberathlete Extreme Winter Championships: (United States) Team XFX

== Day of Defeat ==
- 2004 - Cyberathlete Extreme Winter Championships: (United States) Highball
- 2005 - Cyberathlete Extreme Summer Championships: (United States) Check Six
- 2006 - WSVG Summer Intel Championships 2006: (United States) compLexity

== Descent III ==
- 1999 - Descent 3 World Championships: (United States) Chris "fatal" Bond

== Doom 3 ==
- 2004 - Cyberathlete Extreme Winter Championships: (China) Meng 'RocketBoy' Yang

== FIFA ==
- 2003 - CPL Europe Cannes: (Netherlands) Marco "OmniRocket" Jongerius

== F.E.A.R. ==
- 2005 - Cyberathlete Extreme Winter Championships: (United States) Neal "cleaner" Sisbarro
- 2008 - CPL World Tour Finals 2007: (Sweden) Henrik "Jagad" Dahl

== Halo PC ==
- 2003 - CPL Pentium 4 Winter Championship: (United States) Xeno
- 2004 - Cyberathlete Extreme Summer Championships: (United States)

Team CB_13 (Sygnosis, Crimson Optix)

== Halo 2 ==
- 2005 - Cyberathlete Extreme Summer Championships: (United States) List of Championship Gaming Series teams#3D.NYTeam 3D
- 2005 - Cyberathlete Extreme Winter Championships: (United States) ABob - Alex Redard

== Midtown Madness 2 ==
- 2000 - Gateway Country Challenge: (United States) John 'Linfalgamo' Benedict

== Painkiller ==
- 2004 - Cyberathlete Extreme Summer Championships: (Netherlands) Sander 'Vo0' Kaasjager (Team Fnatic)
- 2004 - Cyberathlete Extreme Winter Championships: (Netherlands) Sander 'Vo0' Kaasjager (Team Fnatic)
- 2005 - CPL World Tour, Turkey: (Netherlands) Sander 'Vo0' Kaasjager (Team Fnatic)
- 2005 - CPL World Tour, Spain: (Germany) Stephan 'SteLam' Lammert (SK Gaming)
- 2005 - CPL World Tour, Brazil: (Netherlands) Sander 'Vo0' Kaasjager (Team Fnatic)
- 2005 - CPL World Tour, Sweden: (Netherlands) Sander 'Vo0' Kaasjager (Team Fnatic)
- 2005 - CPL World Tour, USA: (United States) Johnathan 'Fatal1ty' Wendel (Fatal1ty)
- 2005 - CPL World Tour, UK: (Netherlands) Sander 'Vo0' Kaasjager (Team Fnatic)
- 2005 - CPL World Tour, Singapore: (United States) Johnathan 'Fatal1ty' Wendel (Fatal1ty)
- 2005 - CPL World Tour, Italy: (Netherlands) Sander 'Vo0' Kaasjager (Team Fnatic)
- 2005 - CPL World Tour, Chile: (Sweden) Alexander "ztrider" Ingarv (Team Fnatic)
- 2005 - CPL World Tour Final: (United States) Johnathan 'Fatal1ty' Wendel (Fatal1ty)

== Quake I ==
- 1997 - The FRAG: (United States) Tom 'Gollum' Dawson
- 1998 - The CPL Event: (United States) Dan 'Rix' Hammans
- 2001 - CPL 4-Year Anniversary Event: (Australia) Harley 'HarlsoM' Grey

== Quake II ==
- 1998 - FRAG 2: (United States) Dan 'Rix' Hammans
- 1999 - Extreme Annihilation: (United States) Kurt 'Immortal' Shimada

== Quake II Female ==
- 1999 - GroundZero: (United States) Anne "Lilith" Chang

== Quake III ==
- 1999 - FRAG 3: (United Kingdom) Amir 'Hakeem' Haleem
- 1999 - GroundZero: (United States) Mark 'Wombat' Larsen
- 2000 - Razer CPL Event: (United States) Johnathan 'Fatal1ty' Wendel
- 2000 - CPL Asia Atomic Arena: (Sweden) Henrik 'Blue' Björk
- 2000 - CPL Europe Mplayer: (United States) Johnathan 'Fatal1ty' Wendel
- 2000 - Babbage's CPL Event: (United States) John 'ZeRo4' Hill
- 2001 - CPL Pacific Atomic Event: (United States) Johnathan 'Fatal1ty' Wendel
- 2001 - CPL Latin America(Brazil): Thomaz `Fist1syn` Lysakowski Fortes in April 2001, São Paulo
- 2001 - CPL Latin America (Brazil): Guilherme 'reef' Bento Radominski
- 2001 - CPL Europe (Netherlands): (Russia) Alexey "death" Alexeev
- 2002 - Nostromo Exhibition Tournament: (United States) John 'ZeRo4' Hill
- 2006 - CPL World Season Singapore: (China) Fan "Jibo" Zhibo
- 2006 - CPL World Season Australia: Andrew "Python" Chacha
- 2006 - CPL World Season Brazil: Daniel "Ryu" Souza De Lima
- 2006 - CPL World Season Italy: (Sweden) Magnus "fojii" Olsson
- 2006 - CPL World Season Nordic: (China) Fan "Jibo" Zhibo
- 2006 - CPL World Season Finals: (United States) Paul "czm" Nelson

== Quake III Female ==
- 2000 - FRAG 4: (United States) Cary 'Succubus' Szeto
- 2000 - Babbage's CPL Event: (United States) Cary 'Succubus' Szeto

== Quake III Team Deathmatch ==
- 2000 - FRAG 4: (United States) Clan Kapitol
- 2002 - CPL Europe (Cologne): (Russia) forZe

== Quake IV ==
- 2005 - Cyberathlete Extreme Winter Championships: (Russia) Anton "cooller" Singov (mousesports)

== Team Fortress Classic ==
- 2002 - CPL Pentium 4 Winter Event: (United States) Vindicate

Structure
Vr_
FeaR
Brick
Macros
KidDeath
Stickgod
the_ROCK
Captain Ron
Rent-A-Knight
Hummer

== Unreal Tournament 2003 ==
- 2001 - CPL Pentium 4 Winter Event: (United States) Thaddeus Napier
- 2002 - CPL Pentium 4 Winter Event: (United States) Jonathan 'Fatal1ty' Wendel

== Unreal Tournament 2004 ==
- 2004 - Cyberathlete Extreme Summer Championships: (Germany) SK Gaming

== Warcraft III ==
- 2002 - CPL Europe Oslo: (Bulgaria) Dimitar "DIDI8" Aleksandrov
- 2003 - CPL Europe Cannes: (France) Eric "InToX" Dieulangard
- 2003 - CPL Europe Copenhagen: (Denmark) Bjarke "Bjarke" Rasmussen
- 2005 - CPL Istanbul: (Netherlands) Manuel "Grubby" Schenkhuizen
- 2005 - CPL Chile: (Argentina) Rodolfo "Virus" Ehrhorn
- 2005 - Cyberathlete Extreme Summer Championships: (France) Yoan "ToD" Merlo (4Kings)
- 2011 - CPL Invitational 2011: (China) Huang "TH000" Xiang

== World In Conflict ==
2007 - CPL World Tour Final
2007 February 27–28	(United Kingdom) London	Team Dignitas	Don't Care	inFerno eSports
		(Sweden) Cleric	(United States) Hado	(Italy) Attila
		(Sweden) Low-Life	(United States) MaMe	(Italy) Beta84
		(Sweden) EnergetiC	(United States) wizen	(Italy) Daunt
		(United Kingdom) Moyes	(United States) SwOOsh	(Italy) Hauntspy
		(United Kingdom) PuReBall	(United States) Llama	(Italy) Net_Runner
