= Andreas Thorstensson =

Swedish businessman and web developer

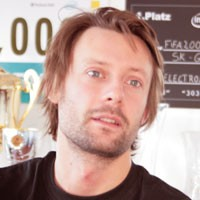
- Born: 29 January 1979 (age 47); Stockholm, Sweden
- Other name: bds
- Occupations: Entrepreneur; Web developer Video game developer
- Spouse: Cajsa Norrefjord (m. 2010)

Esports career information
- Game: Counter-Strike 1.6
- Handle: bds

Team history
- 1999–2001: GeekBoys
- 2001–2009: SK Gaming
- Website: www.geekboys.org

Andreas Thorstensson (born 29 January 1979) is a Swedish entrepreneur, web developer, video game developer and former professional gamer of Counter-Strike, playing under the in-game name bds. Having worked alongside Alexander T. Müller-Rodic as one of two managing directors for the professional electronic sports organization SK Gaming from 2001 to 2009, he created a popular social platform for gaming enthusiasts to congregate and to introduce a stronger awareness to a wider audience. Of Thorstensson's achievements, he is well known for his gaming tools and articles about the Counter-Strike netcode and also for Frag or Die, the single-most downloaded Counter-Strike video to date.

He is widely regarded as one of the most influential innovators for esports, having assisted with establishing standards for player management and gaming communities. Beyond his esports career, he is well known for his many startups such as SPRAYdio, XSReality, ESN, Toborrow, EQT Ventures and Popdog. Since May 2020, Thorstensson has been actively involved with video game development, with his most recent project being the 2026 free-to-play football video game Goals.

== Biography ==
=== 1979–1998: Early life and career ===
Andreas Thorstensson was born on 29 January 1979 in Stockholm, Sweden. According to Thorstensson, his intrigue with programming began in 1989, at the age of ten, with his father's purchase of the 386SX-20. In 1992, he began programming with C and had begun playing video games. Early on, Thorstensson worked to establish a foothold in the technical work industry by beginning as a senior programmer at the recently founded internet company Spray Network in August 1997, until December 1999. In the meantime, he began working as a senior programmer for Razorfish in January 1999 until December of that year. He had a year-long stint as the technical chief for the internet broadcasting company he created called SPRAYdio from January to December 2000. From January to December 2001, Thorstensson worked as a Technical Creative Director for the digital marketing company, Abel & Baker.

=== 1999–2009: GeekBoys and SK Gaming ===
Thorstensson's first widespread attention began with his creation of the news aggregator GeekBoys.org in 1999. Together with his co-workers, Thorstensson turned his attention to the fledgling medium of electronic sports, which he dedicated GeekBoys' resources as a gaming clan and news syndicate. With the popularity of GeekBoys increasing, Thorstensson, now known by the pseudonym of "bds", achieved several record-breaking feats. According to statistics, he became the single dominant global-recognized Counter-Strike demo player. As one of his most-recognized achievements as a player, Thorstensson created Frag or Die, which remains the most-popular frag display to date. Additionally, to improve the accessibility of demos, a program called GeekPlay was created, in order to allow immediate initialization of demo play. On 23 September 2001 the German electronic sports organization Schroet Kommando announced the acquisition of his Scandinavian-based team, as a second Counter-Strike squad. With the individuals of Geekboys transitioning to Schroet Kommando, the original GeekBoys website was sold to Swedes David Garpenstahl and Mattias Hjelmstedt. Over the following months, the two communities would slowly merge as the squad operated under the moniker of "SK.Geekboys". During 2001, Thorstensson was also involved with the creation of XSReality.com, which altered its name and changed hands to Englishman Sujoy Roy, eventually becoming ESReality.com.

Schroet Kommando, (which was increasingly referred to as "SK"), began a revolutionizing system in electronic sports, in which users could gain an elite status by partaking in subscription service, referred to as the "SK Insider". On 1 February 2003 Thorstensson introduced the first case of player contractual agreement with the acquisition of Ninjas in Pyjamas to join SK after they had won an early Cyberathlete Professional League Counter-Strike tournament. NiP accepted his offer due to SK's sponsorship deals with companies such as Intel, which allowed them to travel to major competitions worldwide. The resulting team was the highly popular SK.Sweden team of 2003 through 2004, which became the most dominant team the professional Counter-Strike scene has seen to date. This seemed to come to an end on 2 January 2005, when the team opted out of renewing their contracts in hopes of securing a larger share of the prize money and sponsorships with Ninjas in Pyjamas. However, later that year, on June 26, several of the team members returned to SK.

During his eight years as managing director for SK Gaming, Thorstensson coordinated with his German counterpart, Alexander T. Müller-Rodic, (commonly known as "TheSlaSH"), along with SK's founder Ralf Reichert, (commonly known as "Griff"). The three of them worked to create a business platform around SK Gaming, from which he spent the great part of the entirety of that time operating with Müller-Rodic. Ever since his well-known inclusion into SK Gaming, Thorstensson created several innovative and extremely popular online applications that helped accelerate the growth rate of SK Gaming's already-expansive fan base. This includes the innovative cross-realm ranking system for World of Warcraft that, while in its prime, was the single most-popular third-party cross-realm ranking system in the world. In 2008, Swedish footballer Fredrik Lundgren became a co-owner of the GeekBoys business, with 1% of the company shares, won from a football bet with Thorstensson. On 9 December 2009 Thorstensson announced his retirement from SK Gaming to further pursue his web development profession, maintaining Geekboys.org as his personal business website.

=== 2010-2020: Entrepreneurship and web development ===
Following his departure from SK Gaming, Thorstensson continued maintaining GeekBoys as his web-based business, developing several notable websites, the first being Collected.info, a social networking platform to connect news feeds from other various websites under one account. The website was cooperatively developed by Thorstensson and the website's owners, David Sundan and Ted Persson. Thorstensson's primary project was Njuice.com, which utilizes advanced parsers to scan other networking websites for trending stories, then create an expanded network in itself.

Alongside Sofie Lundström, Thorstensson founded a marketplace lending platform service intended to connect consumers with small businesses in need of loans called Toborrow in 2013. After two years of developing Toborrow, Thorstensson joined the Swedish private equity group EQT AB as a tech partner. Though he would retain a chair on Toborrow's board, his development role was passed on to the developer Michel Radosavljevic. Over the successive three years of Thorstensson's tenure, EQT would maintain a €566 million fund and develop Motherbrain, a tool for identifying promising startup ventures. Thorstensson looked to investment opportunities concerning esports to the table at EQT, to no avail.

After a $9 million Series A funding round, the esports technology and services company Popdog was launched in December 2018, with Thorstensson as a co-founder, CTO and CPO - marking his return to the scene, after nine years. Joining in launching Popdog were former Evil Geniuses (EG) owner Alex Garfield as CEO, consultant Niles Heron as CSO and former EG COO Colin DeShong as CCO. The first brands acquired with Popdog's launch included the premier gaming talent agency Loaded, the world's largest analysis tool for Twitch called Noscope, as well as the Catalyst Sports & Media's e-sports section.

=== 2021-present: Video game development ===
Thorstensson made his debut in video game development in May 2020, as a business consultant for the Danish company Bright Star Studios, known for developing the massively multiplayer online role-playing game Ember Sword. In August 2021, Thorstensson announced the production of the free-to-play football video game Goals, intended to be designed for esports viability. Goals secured $20 million in Series A funding from venture capitalist specialists - Seven Seven Six, Northzone, Moonfire and Cassius - in April 2023, bringing the project and its studio's accumulated financing to $39 million.

== Tournament results ==
- 9 - 12th — 2001 CPL Winter
