= Vo0 =

Dutch professional player

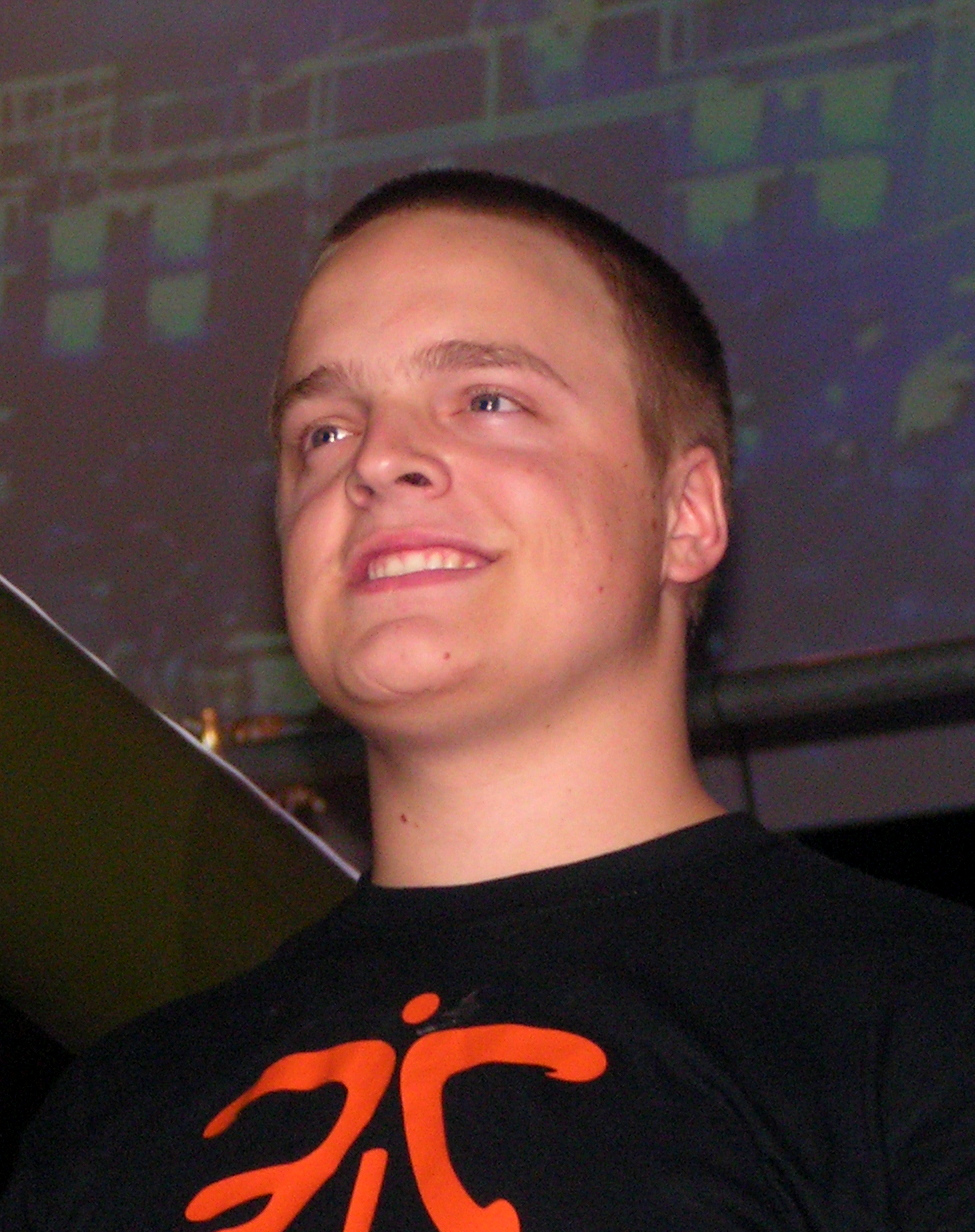
- Kaasjager in 2005

Personal information
- Name: Sander Kaasjager
- Born: 21 June 1985 (age 41); Naarden, Netherlands
- Nationality: Dutch

Career information
- Games: Painkiller; Quake; World of Warcraft
- Playing career: 2004–2006; 2007–2009; 2017–2018

Team history
- 2004–2006: Fnatic
- 2009–2011: compLexity Gaming
- 2017: Myztro

Sander Kaasjager (Dutch pronunciation: [ˈsɑndər ˈkaːɕaːxər]; born 21 June 1985), who plays under the pseudonym Vo0 (pronounced [vu]), is a Dutch professional player of the first-person shooter games Painkiller, Quake II, Quake III , Quake 4, Quake Live and Quake Champions, as well as the MMORPG World of Warcraft. He has won the most titles and prize money from professional Painkiller tournaments out of all other players, having won over US$250,000.

== Career ==
Originally starting with Quake II, Kaasjager later rose to widespread popularity with the release of a self-made highlight montage (or "frag video") from the game Challenge ProMode Arena, which showcases his unique aggressive style of playing.

Kaasjager played Painkiller for esports team Fnatic. Kaasjager won two world championship titles in 2004, one with CPL and one with ESWC. In 2005, Kaasjager competed in the 2005 CPL World Tour, in which he won at five out of nine stops and earned $223,000. Kaasjager was named the Most Valuable Player of the tour. He played in the finals of the CPL World Tour against Fatal1ty but ended up losing.

When the Cyberathlete Professional League, World Series of Video Games, and other tournaments dropped Painkiller in favor of Quake 4, Kaasjager took a break from professional gaming starting from June 21, 2006, to pursue his studies for the upcoming college semester. He made a comeback to competitive gaming on April 30, 2007, participating in the World of Warcraft competition of the World Series of Video Games representing Fnatic once again.

After retiring, he has been known to play Challenge ProMode Arena, Warsow, QuakeWorld, Quake Live, and evading Thunderfury binding drops.

In 2017, at age 32, Kaasjager returned from retirement and finished in second place at the Quake World Championship 2017.

== Tournament placings ==
=== 2004 ===
- 1st – CPL Extreme Summer Championships 2004 – 1on1 (Dallas, U.S.)
- 1st – CPL Extreme Winter Championships 2004 – 1on1 (Dallas, U.S.)
- 1st – Electronic Sports World Cup 2004 – 1on1 (Poitiers, France)
- 1st – Netgamez 2004B – 1on1 (Nieuwegein, Netherlands)

=== 2005 ===
- 2nd – CPL World Tour Grand Finals – 1on1 (New York City)
- 3rd – CPL World Tour Stop Chile 2005 – 1on1 (Santiago, Chile)
- 1st – CPL World Tour Stop Italy 2005 – 1on1 (Milan, Italy)
- 2nd – CPL World Tour Stop Singapore 2005 – 1on1 (Singapore)
- 1st – CPL World Tour Stop UK 2005 – 1on1 (Sheffield)
- 2nd – CPL World Tour Stop USA 2005 – 1on1 (Dallas)
- 1st – CPL World Tour Stop Sweden 2005 – 1on1 (Jönköping)
- 1st – CPL World Tour Stop Brazil 2005 – 1on1 (Rio de Janeiro, Brazil)
- 2nd – CPL World Tour Stop Spain 2005 – 1on1 (Barcelona)
- 1st – CPL World Tour Stop Turkey 2005 – 1on1 (Istanbul)
- 1st – CPL World Tour Spain Qualifier 2005 – 1on1 (Istanbul)

=== 2007 ===
- 2nd – World Series of Video Games, China – 3on3 (Wuhan, China)

=== 2008 ===
- 7th – QuakeCon 2008 Intel Quake Live 1v1 Championship – 1on1 (Dallas, Texas, USA)
- 8th – GameGune 2008 – 1on1 (Bilbao, Spain)
- 13th – Electronic Sports World Cup Masters of Paris– 1on1 (Paris, France)
- 2nd – Electronic Sports World Cup qualifier – 1on1 (Enschede, Netherlands)

=== 2009 ===
- 4th – Intel Extreme Masters Season IV American Championship finals, Quake Live – 1on1 (Edmonton, Alberta, Canada)
- 1st – Dreamhack Summer CPM, Quake III Championship – 1on1 (Jönköping, Sweden)

=== 2017 ===
- 2nd – Quake World Championship 2017: Duel Tournament finals, Quake Champions – 1on1 (Dallas, USA)

=== Awards ===
- Most Valuable Player CPL World Tour 2005
- (ESports Award) Newcomer / Breakthrough of the Year 2005

== Personal life ==
Kaasjager was born in Naarden, Netherlands on June 21, 1985. He enrolled in Delft as a student of mechanical engineering but dropped out to focus on gaming. He attended the University of Texas at Dallas and was a member of the Texas-Dallas Comets men's tennis team. Vo0 has a Bachelor of Science degree in mechanical engineering.
