= Painkiller: Overdose =

- Developer(s): Mindware Studios
- Publisher(s): NA: DreamCatcher Interactive; EU: JoWooD Productions
- Composer(s): Ján Dušek
- Platform(s): Windows
- Release: 23 October 2007
- Genre(s): First-person shooter
- Mode(s): Single-player, multiplayer

Painkiller: Overdose is a stand-alone expansion pack for the first-person shooter video game Painkiller, developed by Mindware Studios. Mindware originally intended it to be fan-made mod but the publisher DreamCatcher Interactive granted the project full financial and technical support, and officially published it in 2007. The expansion offers 40 types of monsters, 16 additional levels, and six additional weapons. It is the second expansion of Painkiller with the first being Battle Out of Hell.

== Plot ==
The player takes the role of Belial, a half-angel, half-demon gatekeeper and son of angel Samael. He was rejected by both hell and heaven, and as a result, Samael and Cerberus imprisoned him. When Daniel Garner defeats Lucifer in Painkiller, Belial escapes his prison and starts to seek revenge.

== Reception ==
Painkiller: Overdose received mixed reviews from critics. Reviews of Overdose were more positive than reviews of other expansions (with the exception of Battle out of Hell). It was criticised for lack of innovation and slow loads but praised for gameplay that is the same as in original game.

== Sequels ==
Belial, the playable protagonist of Overdose, reappeared in all later expansions and sequels. In Painkiller: Redemption Belial was one of two playable characters. Redemption was developed by Eggtooth Team and released in 2011. Belial also briefly appeared in Painkiller: Hell & Damnation which serves as a remake and sequel to original Painkiller.
