= CPMA =

CPMA may refer to:

- Certified Professional Management Accountant (CPMA) certification from the Indonesian Institute of Management Accountants (Ikatan Akuntan Manajemen Indonesia)
- Challenge ProMode Arena, a modification for the Quake III: Arena PC video game
- Consumer Protection and Markets Authority (United Kingdom), a proposed UK regulatory body
- Certified Medical Auditing though AAPC
- Certified Project Management Analyst (CPMA) certification from IQN
- Certified Project Management Associate
