= 2005 Cyberathlete Professional League World Tour =

The 2005 CPL World Tour was a year-long gaming competition held by the Cyberathlete Professional League (CPL). This competition took place throughout 2005, with a total of nine international stops and a finals event held in the New York City, United States and televised by MTV.

The total purse was US$1,000,000, with $50,000 at each international stop, and a $500,000 final. The official game of the 2005 World Tour was Painkiller. The CPL's "strategic partners", organizations designated to operate regional World Tour stops, also chose to hold smaller tournaments for other popular competitive games, such as Counter-Strike.

The World Tour Grand Finals took place between November 20 and 22 2005 and were hosted in New York City, New York, United States. The Finals hosted the top 32 Painkiller winners from all stops around the globe. They pitted in a one versus one tournament for the largest first place prize in the CPL's history: US$150,000. The total prize fund for the finals tournament was $500,000, the largest ever for a Painkiller tournament.

The champion of the 2005 CPL World Tour was Johnathan 'Fatal1ty' Wendel, who took the grand prize of $150,000. Sander "Vo0" Kaasjager was named the MVP of the tour, an award worth $20,000, and took $100,000 for becoming the runner-up in the finals. By this, Wendel took his fourth CPL World Championship, taking the crown back from Kaasjager, who had taken it from him a year earlier.

== Painkiller Results ==
Finals	Gold	Silver	Bronze	4th
(United States) New York City	(United States) Johnathan "Fatal1ty" Wendel	(Netherlands) Sander "Vo0" Kaasjager	(Italy) Alessandro "Stermy" Avallone	(Germany) Benjamin "zyz" Bohrmann
Most Valuable Player	(Netherlands) Sander "Vo0" Kaasjager	(United States) Johnathan "Fatal1ty" Wendel	(Germany) Benjamin "zyz" Bohrmann	(Italy) Alessandro "Stermy" Avallone

Tour Stop	Gold	Silver	Bronze	4th
(Turkey) Istanbul	(Netherlands) Sander "Vo0" Kaasjager	(United States) Johnathan "Fatal1ty" Wendel	(Italy) Alessandro "Stermy" Avallone	(Sweden) Johan "sakh" Hessedal
(Spain) Barcelona	(Germany) Stephan "SteLam" Lammert	(Netherlands) Sander "Vo0" Kaasjager	(Italy) Alessandro "Stermy" Avallone	(Germany) Benjamin "zyz" Bohrmann
(Brazil) Rio de Janeiro	(Netherlands) Sander "Vo0" Kaasjager	(United States) Johnathan "Fatal1ty" Wendel	(Germany) Benjamin "zyz" Bohrmann	(Sweden) Alexander "Ztrider" Ingarv
(Sweden) Jönköping	(Netherlands) Sander "Vo0" Kaasjager	(United States) Johnathan "Fatal1ty" Wendel	(Germany) Benjamin "zyz" Bohrmann	(Sweden) Alexander "Ztrider" Ingarv
(United States) Dallas	(United States) Johnathan "Fatal1ty" Wendel	(Netherlands) Sander "Vo0" Kaasjager	(Sweden) Alexander "Ztrider" Ingarv	(Germany) Benjamin "zyz" Bohrmann
(United Kingdom) Sheffield	(Netherlands) Sander "Vo0" Kaasjager	(United States) Johnathan "Fatal1ty" Wendel	(Germany) Benjamin "zyz" Bohrmann	(United Kingdom) David "Zaccubus" Treacy
Singapore	(United States) Johnathan "Fatal1ty" Wendel	(Netherlands) Sander "Vo0" Kaasjager	(Italy) Alessandro "Stermy" Avallone	(Canada) Andrew "gellehsak" Ryder
(Italy) Milan	(Netherlands) Sander "Vo0" Kaasjager	(United States) Johnathan "Fatal1ty" Wendel	(Sweden) Alexander "Ztrider" Ingarv	(Germany) Benjamin "zyz" Bohrmann
(Chile) Santiago	(Sweden) Alexander "Ztrider" Ingarv	(Canada) Andrew "gellehsak" Ryder	(Netherlands) Sander "Vo0" Kaasjager	(Germany) Benjamin "zyz" Bohrmann

== Tour Stops ==
=== Turkey ===
- Location: Istanbul, Turkey
- Date: March 25–March 27, 2005
- Champion: Sander "Vo0" Kaasjager
- Strategic Partner: E-Sportr

=== Spain ===
- Location: Barcelona, Spain
- Date: April 29–May 1, 2005
- Champion: Stephan "SteLam" Lammert
- Strategic Partner: E-Life Europe

=== Brazil ===
- Location: Rio de Janeiro, Brazil
- Date: May 27–May 30, 2005
- Champion: Sander "Vo0" Kaasjager
- Strategic Partner: Marketing Cell

=== Sweden ===
- Location: Jönköping, Sweden
- Date: June 16–June 19, 2005
- Champion: Sander "Vo0" Kaasjager
- Strategic Partner: E-Sport Entertainment Group

=== United States ===
- Location: Dallas, Texas, United States
- Date: July 6–July 10, 2005
- Champion: Johnathan 'Fatal1ty' Wendel

=== Germany ===
- Location: Berlin, Germany
- Date: Cancelled
- This stop was cancelled due to "critical logistical challenges", this stop was replaced by the Italy stop.

=== United Kingdom ===
- Location: Sheffield, UK
- Date: September 2–September 4, 2005
- Champion: Sander "Vo0" Kaasjager
- Strategic Partner: Gamefrontier

=== China ===
- Location: Beijing, China
- Date: Cancelled
- This stop was also cancelled due to the Chinese Ministry of Culture (China)'s ban on Painkiller in China. A replacement stop was held in Singapore.

=== Singapore ===
- Location: Singapore, Singapore
- Date: October 14–October 16, 2005
- Champion: Johnathan 'Fatal1ty' Wendel
- Strategic Partner: Edge of Reality

=== Italy ===
- Location: Milan, Italy
- Date: October 20–October 23, 2005
- Champion: Sander "Vo0" Kaasjager
- Strategic Partner: smau

=== Chile ===
- Location: Santiago, Chile
- Date: October 28–October 30, 2005
- Champion: Alexander "Ztrider" Ingarv
- Strategic Partner: LAN-Z.net
