= World Series of Video Games =

Professional electronic sports competition

- Sport: Esports; Video games
- Founded: 2002
- Replaced by: Cyberathlete Professional League
- Owner: Games Media Properties
- Commissioner: Matt Ringel
- Country: United States

World Series of Video Games (WSVG) was an international professional electronic sports competition. It held its first season in 2006, with competitions in six different games and six events held around the world including the finals of the event. The total prize purse of the season was US$750,000 which includes the $240,000 prize purse that was winnable at the finals. The WSVG was operated by Games Media Properties, an American gaming company founded in 2002 with the BYOC (Bring Your Own Computer) Lan section subcontracted out to Lanwar Inc.

The series was the continuation of the one million dollar 2005 CPL World Tour, as Intel, the major sponsor of the tour, left the Cyberathlete Professional League to help fund these series.

== 2006 season ==
The 2006 season was the WSVG's first season. International competitions were held for the PC games Counter-Strike, Quake 4, and Warcraft III. Xbox tournaments were also held for Project Gotham Racing 3, Ghost Recon: Advanced Warfighter, and Halo 2, but these were open to American participants only.

Participants included Johnathan "Fatal1ty" Wendel, four-time CPL world champion and runner-up of the WSVG Quake 4 competition, Dae Hui 'FoV' Cho (veteran professional gamer, one time Electronic Sports World Cup champion and third place of the WarCraft III competition), Li 'Sky' Xiaofeng (twice World Cyber Games champion, considered strongest WarCraft III player of 2006 in a worldwide poll of gaming journalists) and Team 3D (twice World Cyber Games champion team and runner-up of the WSVG Counter-Strike competition), as well as eventual champions Johan 'Toxic' Quick and eSport Player of 2006 Manuel 'Grubby' Schenkhuizen.

CBS aired a one-hour special on the WSVG stop in Louisville.

The six events took place at the following times and places during the first season:

- June 15–18: Louisville, Kentucky, United States — Kentucky Exposition Center
- June 17–19: Jönköping, Sweden — Elmia Exhibition Center
- July 5–9: Grapevine, Texas, United States — Gaylord Texan Resort & Convention Center
- September 7–9: Chengdu, PR China — Sichuan University Stadium
- October 13–15: London, United Kingdom — The London Trocadero
- December 9–11: New York, New York, United States — Chelsea Piers

Game	Gold	Silver	Bronze	4th
Counter-Strike	(Germany) aTTaX (Germany) David "CHEF-KOCH" Nagel (Germany) Peter "Chucky" Schlosser (Germany) Navid "Kapio" Javadi (Germany) Jan "mooN" Stolle (Germany) Roman "roman" Ausserdorfer	(United States) Team 3D (United States) Josh "Dominator" Sievers (United States) Mikey "Method" So (Canada) Griffin "shaGuar" Benger (United States) Ron "Rambo" Kim (United States) Salvatore "Volcano" Garozzo	(European Union) fnatic (Sweden) Oscar "Archi" Torgersen (Sweden) Patrik "cArn" Sättermon (Sweden) Harley "dsn" Orwall (Sweden) Patrik "f0rest" Lindberg (Sweden) Kristoffer "Tentpole" Nordlund	(United States) Pandemic (United States) Chad "Daffsta" White (Canada) Garett "grt" Bambrough (United States) Jonny "Ph33R" Schwan (United States) Hoang "s0nNy" Tran (United States) Mark "mastern00k" Torrez
Quake 4	(Sweden) Johan "Toxic" Quick	(United States) Johnathan "Fatal1ty" Wendel	(United States) Jason "Socrates_" Sylka	(Russia) Anton "Cooller" Singov
Warcraft III: The Frozen Throne	(Netherlands) Manuel "Grubby" Schenkhuizen	(South Korea) Jung Hee "Sweet" Chun	(South Korea) Dae Hui "FoV" Cho	(United States) Dennis "Shortround" Chan

== 2007 season ==
WSVG's second season featured Fight Night Round 3, Guitar Hero II, Quake 4, Warcraft III and World of Warcraft as main circuit games. Counter-Strike, Call of Duty 2 and Gears of War were planned to also make appearances at a number of events.

The circuit's total prize purse was planned to be US$574,000, and travel funds were made available to a number of high-finishing participants.

The second season included events at the following times and places throughout 2007:

- May 1–3: Wuhan, PR China
- June 21–24: Louisville, Kentucky, United States
- July 5–8: Grapevine, Texas, United States
- August 23–26: Toronto, Ontario, Canada
- October 18–21: Los Angeles, California, United States - Cancelled
- November 16–18: London, United Kingdom - Cancelled
- November 29–December 2: Sweden - Cancelled

A television production company, TV By Mills (now Spacestation), was brought on to create the televised WSVG episodes on CBS. This was the first time a video game competition was featured in an hour-long format on network television in the United States.

== Cancellation ==
In a surprise move on September 12, 2007, the WSVG main page announced that "Games Media Properties will no longer produce the World Series of Video Games", and that the remaining three events (Los Angeles, London, and Sweden) were all cancelled. The reasons given were that revenue from the previous events were not enough to sustain the league, especially because of its extensive televising campaign and enormous event sizes.

The WSVG has stated that it wishes to continue expansion in online advertising and their network of websites.

== 2014 ==
After the cancellation in 2007, the World Series of Video Games was relaunched by World Series Corporation in August 2014.

One of the key elements in this new version of the World Series of Video Games, is the exclusive software that they present called WSVG Battleroom, that includes an anti-cheat feature that is at the forefront of technology, promoting the clean gaming.

WSVG hosted a LAN event in Maldives in October 2015 which included games like Starcraft 2, Hearthstone, FIFA & Age of Empires 2. From the day the event was announced doubts were being raised on its viability on various other gaming forums.

The LAN event was not particularly great from organization point of view and was marred with technical & logistical issues. The event had a total prize pool of $50,000, but $32,000 was not paid out to teams and players. Since the conclusion of Maldives event no future plans have been divulged.
