= Painkiller: Resurrection =

2009 video game

- European PC box art
- Developer: Homegrown Games
- Publishers: DreamCatcher Interactive (North America); JoWooD Entertainment (Europe & Australia)
- Engine: PainEngine (with Havok)
- Platform: Microsoft Windows
- Release: NA: October 27, 2009; EU: November 6, 2009; AU: February 25, 2010
- Genre: First-person shooter
- Modes: Single-player, multiplayer

Painkiller: Resurrection is a first-person shooter video game developed by Homegrown Games and published by DreamCatcher Interactive (now acquired by Nordic Games). It is a stand-alone expansion to the 2004 Painkiller, and runs on an updated version of PainEngine. It was released for Microsoft Windows in 2009. There was a planned Xbox 360 version, but was cancelled.

== Gameplay ==
The gameplay of Painkiller Resurrection is identical to the original Painkiller, in which the player must complete a linear set of levels by means of clearing out various arenas that the player is locked into, and fighting off large groups of varying types of enemies using the unique arsenal of the original Painkiller.

Whenever the last enemy dies within an arena, the doors to the next room will open up, allowing the player to continue forward through the level. This process is repeated throughout the entire length of the level, and eventually leading the player to an exit portal that will end the level the moment the player touches it.

Along with needing to reach the end of a level, the player is also given the option of completing an optional side task within the mission, which will reward the player with a new tarot card that can be used to give the player a boost on the next mission. These optional side tasks tend to vary in terms of difficulty, with some tasks being quite difficult to complete, if not impossible on a first run.

However, where Resurrection differs from the original Painkiller, is that the levels are large and open, which in turn, allows the player a bit more freedom to explore them for items. Often times, almost the entire map is immediately accessible to the player, which unfortunately leads to a few problems involving the player losing their direction, leading to situations in which it is unclear to where they are expected to go. The larger, opened areas of Resurrection also presents a few navigation and spawn glitches, that can further hinder progress.

As an expansion, Resurrection mostly uses assets from the original Painkiller, with the addition of two new weapons, along with an original storyline featuring comic book styled cutscenes, similar in style to the first two games in the Max Payne series of video games.

== Plot ==
The story begins outside of the events depicted in other games and stars new protagonist: William "Bill" Sherman. Blown to pieces by his own C4 payload, with which he wanted to eliminate a group of mobsters. The fact that he also accidentally blew up a bus full of innocent civilians has given rise to an all new problem – Hell doesn't exactly have any issues with claiming his soul. Now Bill's in purgatory and he's caught the eye of one of the Elyahim, the female spirits who guide the souls of men through purgatory. Guided by the Elyahim's voice, Bill, like Daniel Garner, is sent through this unholy realm to save his soul by destroying evil beings.

After he defeats Aamon, a monstrous dog demon, a greater demon appears, revealing himself to be Astaroth, one of the generals of Lucifer. He asks Bill to join him, but Bill rejects. Surprisingly, Astaroth leaves Bill to continue his fight. After defeating a powerful spider-like demon, an angel, Ramiel, appears, asking Bill to continue his fighting and cleanse purgatory in exchange for a chance to return to life. Later, after more fighting through demons, Bill is greeted by Elyahim in person. She explains that Ramiel betrayed Heaven and now he and Astaroth are planning to conquer purgatory, so it could become their dominion. As Hell and Heaven are weakened, they would be able to claim all the new souls coming to the afterlife and soon become the most prominent force in the world. However, to do so, they needed Bill to eliminate the majority of demons, so none of them would reveal to Hell Astaroth's true motives. Now, Bill has to battle both of them at the same time. He kills Astaroth and wounds Ramiel, who begs him to spare his life. In exchange, Ramiel will return Bill back to Earth. From this point, three endings are possible.

- Good ending: Ramiel fulfills his promise and sends Bill back to life. Bill arrives a night before the incident happened. He takes the C4 off the car and throws it into the sea. Bill smiles, being happy for the first time. He decides to never return to killing again, understanding that the sole meaning of life is life itself.
- Bad ending: Ramiel fulfills his promise and sends Bill back to life. But it is all a trick, as Bill is sent to the exact moment he committed his greatest sin and died. Bill, again, tries to save the bus... but is killed again, this time being sent to Hell forever.
- Neutral ending: Ramiel awaits Bill to agree to be sent back to life, but Elyahim appears. She warns Bill that the angel cannot be trusted as he has become corrupted. From her, Bill receives a holy sword: the only weapon with which a mortal could kill an angel. Bill strikes Ramiel and kills him. He is awarded by the heavens to be the ruler of the realm of purgatory.

The neutral ending is the decisive ending where Bill's story continues in Painkiller: Recurring Evil.

== Reception ==
Reception

Aggregate score
Aggregator	Score
Metacritic	38/100

Review scores
Publication	Score
GameSpot	3.5/10
IGN	2.6/10
PC Gamer (UK)	56%
PC Zone	19%

Painkiller: Resurrection received "unfavorable" reviews according to the review aggregation website Metacritic

IGN rated Painkiller: Resurrection as painful citing it as a "repulsive cocktail of inconvenience, design missteps and frustration that fails to entertain on any level."
