= Goals (video game) =

2026 football simulation video game

- Developer: Goals AB
- Publisher: Goals AB
- Director: Andreas Thorstensson
- Designer: Frans Perers
- Engine: Unreal Engine 5
- Platforms: PlayStation 5; Windows; Xbox Series X/S
- Release: June 4, 2026
- Genre: Sports
- Mode: Multiplayer

Goals (stylized as GOALS) is a football video game developed & published by Goals AB. Conceptualized by Andreas Thorstensson, Goals follows a free-to-play business model with a focus on esports viability. First announced on July 22, 2021, the game intends to compete with the EA Sports FC and eFootball series of video games, with a focus on responsiveness over fidelity. The game features cross-platform play, for PlayStation 5, Windows and Xbox Series X/S platforms. Goals entered its open beta period on March 13, 2026. The game was released for all its platforms on June 4, 2026. A Nintendo Switch 2 version is in development and a mobile version is set to release in 2027. The game was released to initially mixed reception, with praise for its visuals and performance and criticism toward its passing mechanics and artificial intelligence.

== Gameplay ==
A player kicks the ball in an attempt to score a goal

Goals places players on football pitches at different arenas, with game modes of 1v1 & 5v5. A practice mode called "The Arena" may be accessed, allowing for testing player avatars & features.

== Development ==
Swedish gamer & programmer Andreas Thorstensson was one of the earliest professional Counter-Strike players, with his career beginning shortly after the release of the game in 1999. As a player, executive and owner of the German and Swedish organization Schroet Kommando, which became SK Gaming, he led it to become one of the most prolific in the scene, before retiring in 2009. After several web development & entrepreneurship ventures over the subsequent decade, Thorstensson teased Goals as his new venture, before formally announcing it as a football video game on August 18, 2021. Thorstensson detailed his intention to develop an esports-ready AAA cross-platform multiplayer game that would reward players.

Goals is built using Unreal Engine 5. An objective outlined by Thorstensson from the onset was to give audiences access to Goals during its early days, allowing for the team to gauge feedback and combat bugs before release. Early access testing for Goals began with a single-player demo called the "Arena" in September 2022, with rudimentary functionality implemented. The following February, multiplayer access on a football pitch setting began.

In April 2022, Goals AB was announced to have raised $15 million in seed funding, led by venture capitalist firm Northzone. In April 2023, Goals received an additional $20 million in funding - led by Reddit founder Alexis Ohanian’s venture capital firm Seven Seven Six and supported by Northzone, Moonfire, Cassius and angel investors Peter Sellis, Wayne Mackey, Riqui Puig and Clément Lenglet - bringing the total funding to $39 million. In July 2023, Goals AB's board was bolstered by the arrivals of Ebba Ljungerud and Oskar Gabrielson, the former chief executive officers of Paradox Interactive and DICE, respectively.

== Release ==
Following closed tests and controlled access periods, Goals began its open beta period on March 13, 2026. The game was released for Windows, Xbox Series X/S and PlayStation 5 on June 4, 2026.

== Reception ==
In his review of Goals, Ford James from Polygon lauded the game for being the "best soccer game" in years, owed to its simplicity compared to FIFA, as well as its potential for further refinement. Keith Stuart from The Guardian commended Goals for being an alternative to FIFA and Pro Evolution Soccer in an uncontested market, with praise given to the game's physics and network responsiveness, while criticizing it for its stylized visuals and artificial intelligence player logic. Ripan Majumdar from Sportskeeda levied similar criticisms against the game's AI in a mixed review upon release, calling players' tendency to stand still frustrating, further compounded by passing mechanics.
