= Painkiller: Hell & Damnation =

2012 first-person shooter video game

- Developer: The Farm 51
- Publisher: Nordic Games
- Directors: Wojciech Pazdur; Kamil Bilczyński
- Designers: Marcin Wielocha; Przemysław Pomorski
- Programmer: Wojciech Knopf
- Writers: Maciej Jurewicz; Jacek Komuda
- Composers: Adam Skorupa; Marcin Czartyński; Patryk Gegniewicz; Dominik Popinski
- Engine: Unreal Engine 3
- Platforms: Microsoft Windows, Linux, OS X, PlayStation 3, Xbox 360
- Release: Microsoft Windows: WW: October 31, 2012; PlayStation 3: EU: June 28, 2013; NA: November 26, 2013 (digital); NA: December 13, 2013 (retail); Xbox 360: EU: June 28, 2013; NA: October 1, 2013 (digital)
- Genre: First-person shooter
- Modes: Single-player, multiplayer

Painkiller: Hell & Damnation is a first-person shooter video game, both a remake of and a sequel to Painkiller, developed by The Farm 51 and published by Nordic Games. The game was released on October 31, 2012, for Microsoft Windows and for PlayStation 3 and Xbox 360 on June 28, 2013, in Europe after suffering multiple delays. It was released in North America for Xbox 360 through Xbox Live on October 1, 2013, and for PlayStation 3 through the PlayStation Store on November 26, 2013.

Painkiller: Hell & Damnation received a mixed reception among gaming publications.

== Gameplay ==
The player has to get through each level, from start to finish, by slaughtering multitudinous demons. The game is divided into several chapters, each with several levels. Each level presents a new location with various themes and includes castles, monasteries, graveyards, and more. Several classic weapons return, including the Painkiller, the stakethrower, the shotgun, and the electrodriver. New guns are also available such as the Soulcatcher, which shoots saw blades in primary firing mode and sucks the souls out of the enemies with its secondary firing.

Painkiller: Hell & Damnation also adds several multiplayer modes to the series. The entire single-player campaign can be played by two people and the level of difficulty adjusts in accordance with the two players, either through the number of enemies or hit points. In survival mode, up to eight players battle for survival in a limited area of one map. Endless waves of enemy hordes will attack the player or players. Other player vs player based game modes include deathmatch, team deathmatch, capture the flag and duels.

== Plot ==
After crushing the forces of Hell and Purgatory in the original titles, Daniel Garner was denied seeing his wife, Catherine. Now, with no faith left, he sat in the cemetery, where his quest once began. Suddenly, Death itself appeared, proposing Daniel a new bargain: reunion with his wife in exchange for 7,000 souls. Daniel reluctantly agrees, receiving the Soulcatcher gun. He is sent to familiar places, battling hordes of demon-spawn, again defeating the formidable Necrogiant, Alastor, and Swamp Thing. An old ally, Eve, reappears during this quest, warning that Death cannot be trusted, but Daniel didn't forget her own betrayal at the end of Painkiller: Battle out of Hell. Daniel avoids her as she tries to persuade him that everything is not as it seems, and the only reason that he is so successful at killing demons and not succumbing to their power is that he is not really dead.

Eventually, Daniel returns to Death, with the Soulcatcher filled. Death, however, is not pleased, as there are only 6,999 souls, and not 7,000, but still advises Daniel to get the final soul: that of Eve. Daniel, disgusted by such a turn of events, spares Eve, infuriating Death. Battle ensues, culminating with Death's defeat and an opening of a strange white portal. By taking the portal, Daniel discovers himself alive, lying in bed, in a hospital. All this time, he was alive, but in a coma, bound by Death to an endless battle in Purgatory. Suddenly, Eve appears, claiming that the souls collected enabled Death to reunite with his brothers, the other Horsemen of Apocalypse: Pestilence, Famine, and War, which are now plotting to invade Earth. Daniel feels that he will be unable to battle the hordes of Hell without the power that he wielded in Purgatory, but Eve comforts him, saying that they are not alone and he will be just a sidekick. A door opens, revealing the demonic visage of Belial (from Painkiller: Overdose) who calls Daniel to stand up and help him fight Death and his Horsemen.

== Marketing ==
=== Retail editions ===
The "regular edition", also known as "totally uncut", was released for PC on October 31, 2012. Windows users could also obtain the regular version through download services such as Steam. Xbox 360 and PlayStation 3 versions of the game were released on June 28, 2013, after suffering multiple release delays.

The "toned down" version was released on the same day as the Xbox 360 and PlayStation 3 version. This version came to pass due to the German censors refusing to give it an age rating because it was "deemed too evil", according to Nordic Games.

The "collectors edition" was released on October 31, 2012, initially for the PC version and eventually for the Xbox 360 and PlayStation 3 on June 28, 2013. It includes stickers, "postcards from hell", an art book, posters, a ten-track soundtrack CD, a making-of DVD, a special in-game tarot card and an exclusive multiplayer skin.

Some versions of the game include the original Painkiller plus the Battle Out of Hell expansion.

On October 17, 2013, a beta Linux version of the game was made available to Steam customers who had already acquired the Windows version.

=== Pre-orders ===
For those who planned to buy the game on PC through Steam, they had the option to pre-purchase Painkiller: Hell & Damnation and receive special rewards. Painkiller's pre-purchase reward structure is different from other games. The first reward, immediate access to the beta on Steam, was available to anyone who pre-purchased the game. The second and third rewards were accessed with the help of others who also pre-purchased it. After so many units had been pre-purchased, the second reward, a multiplayer body skin pack was unlocked. The third reward, a free copy of Painkiller: Black Edition, was unlocked when the number of pre-purchased units exceeded a certain number, following a similar reward structure to the second reward.

== Reception ==
Reception

Aggregate scores
Aggregator	Score
GameRankings	67.48% (PC); 42% (PS3); 59.86% (X360)
Metacritic	64/100 (PC); 40/100 (PS3); 53/100 (X360)

Review scores
Publication	Score
Destructoid	8/10
Eurogamer	5/10
GameSpot	7/10
GameSpy	4/5
GameZone	7.5/10
IGN	5/10
Inside Gaming	8.5/10
PC Gamer	58/100

Painkiller: Hell & Damnation has had a mixed reception among gaming publications. The Windows version of the game holds a score of 64/100 on Metacritic while the PlayStation 3 and Xbox 360 versions hold a score of 40/100 and 53/100 respectively. The average review score of the Windows version of the game on GameRankings is 67.48% while the average review score of the PlayStation 3 and Xbox 360 versions is 42% and 59.86% respectively. Many have praised the graphical quality of the game, with GameSpot's Nathan Meunier saying it has had a "great visual makeover". Other positives are the great weapon variety and craziness of the weapons, IGN stated the game has a "great selection of totally over-the-top weaponry". GameZone's David Sanchez gave the PS3 version a 7.5/10, stating "Hell & Damnation is a good FPS that harkens back to an era that was all about shooting sh*t up and not giving a damn. There's little variety, the game sticks closely to a formula that fans of modern shooters won't dig, and at about four hours, it's painfully short."

According to critics, one of the biggest gripes about Painkiller: Hell & Damnation is the enemy AI. IGN called the AI "dumb and often glitchy". GameSpy's Mike Nelson expanded on this saying "the poor AI makes them [bosses] susceptible to getting stuck in the environment". Other reviewers had issues with the short campaign and problems with multiplayer.
