= World Cyber Games Challenge =

The World Cyber Games Challenge was held in Yongin, South Korea from the October 7th to the 15th in 2000. Total prize money was $200,000.

== Official games ==
- First-person shooter (FPS)
  - Quake III Arena
- Real-Time Strategy (RTS)
  - Age of Empires II
  - StarCraft: Brood War
- Sport
  - FIFA 2000

== Results ==
Event	Gold	Silver	Bronze
Age of Empires II	(South Korea) Myung-Jin Jung	(Taiwan) Y-Kuei Huang	(South Korea) Jae-Baek Lee
FIFA 2000	(South Korea) Ji-Hun Lee	(South Korea) Jin-Hyung Park	(South Korea) Ro-Su Lee
Quake III Arena	(United States) Johnathan Wendel (Fatal1ty)	(Sweden) Oskar Ljungström (LakermaN)	(United States) Johnathan Hill (ZeRo4)
StarCraft: Brood War	(South Korea) Tae-Min Park (GoRush)	(South Korea) Il-Suk Jang (I_Love.Star)	(Netherlands) Anker Jacob Scharn (NTT)
