= DeFRaG =

Mod for Quake III Arena

- Developer: DeFRaG team
- Designers: Programming; Cyril "cgg" Gantin; Cliff "m00m1n" Rowley; John "Ozone-Junkie" Mason Additional code Challenge Promode; Piotr "Camping Gaz" ("CGaz") Zambrzycki "BeRsErKeR" "Firestarter" "w3sp" Ian McGinnis marky
- Engine: id Tech 3 (Quake III Arena)
- Platforms: Mac OS X, Linux, Microsoft Windows
- Release: 1.92.02 (beta); 1.91.31
- Genre: First-person shooter
- Modes: Single player, Multiplayer

DeFRaG (also capitalised as defrag, abbreviated as df, and its name comes from « Défis Fragdome ») is a free software modification for id Software's first-person shooter computer game Quake III Arena (Q3A). The mod is dedicated to player movements and trickjumping. (Note: Trickjumping is an integral part of the game allowing a player to jump higher, further and move faster. For further reading, see techniques section.) It aims at providing a platform for self-training, competition, online tricking, machinima making, and trickjumping. Hence it constitutes an exception among other Q3A mods.

The mod includes a variety of features—timers and meters, ghost mode, cheat prevention and learning tools. Specially designed maps are provided that will rely on the player's movement abilities to be completed up to the finish line, while standard Q3A maps and Capture the Flag (CTF) fast captures are supported as well. Furthermore, gamespace physics from both the original Q3A and the Challenge ProMode Arena (CPMA) mod are supported.

The modification was released to the public in ca. September–October 2000. In 2002, DeFRaG was selected as "Mod of the Week" at Planet Quake.

== Overview ==
CGazHUD (at center of the screen) provides three bars to help the player jump properly.

DeFRaG was initially designed for making possible a new kind of competition based on timed runs. Those competitions called "DeFRaG runs" differ from common speedruns in several ways. Unlike speedruns, DeFRaG runs are not done in maps from an out-of-the-box original game, but in specially designed and customed DeFRaG maps, and there are no opponents to be vanquished during the run. Due to their design, many of these maps cannot be completed by normal player skills. Instead, trickjumping skills are required. Furthermore, start-, checkpoints-, and stop-triggers are built into the maps. As a proof of the accomplishment the mod automatically records a demo of every map completed successfully. Along with the demo, the precise time in which the map was completed is stored.

=== Competition and community ===
The mod's competitive method is lent to it by an online infrastructure which has triggered the formation of a transnational community. Players download custom-designed maps (more than 16,000 DeFRaG maps are available) and aim to complete the map's objectives in the shortest time possible. The best times can be submitted to online high score tables, which are keeping track of the fastest times for particular maps. These online scoreboards can be global or encompass certain regions only. During the mod's highest popularity, the DeFRaG development team periodically released new map packs, containing a number of officially sanctioned maps. These are generally the only maps on which times are accepted for the official website high score tables. In consequence, the DeFraG community's individual members engage and specialize in one or more different practices: trickjumping itself, movie making, map making, coding, maintaining websites, portals (for interaction and as archives for maps and movies), and online scoreboards.

=== Violence ===
The DeFRaG modification completely removes violence (except for the ability of the player to explode into bloody chunks) from the otherwise visceral first-person shooter. The gameplay mode or discipline called "deathmatch" came of age with Doom and was also in Q3A, the latter being dedicated to multiplayer competition. From these games electronic sports, and particularly its professional variant emerged. The same games drove the computer games and violence controversy to unprecedented heights. While the Doom series was heavily criticized for its gory content, the problem with Q3A was seen to be its focus on deathmatch, because in this discipline the ultimate objective is to kill ("frag"), as many other players as possible. In DeFRaG's [sic] gameplay modes killing opponents has no place whatsoever. DeFRaG gameplay is all about improving the skills to exploit the peculiarities of the Q3A physics in order to move faster, to navigate along courses through the map topographies formerly deemed to be impossible, or to perform moves as yet unseen. In consequence, the in-game weapons are no more regarded as instruments of destruction. DeFRaG players use them as tools for moving around the game. This transformation of a first-person shooter into a vehicle for "virtual gymnastics" meanwhile has gradually been recognized by mainstream media. It is thrown into the public discourse as a counterweight to the stereotype of computer games fostering violent behavior. The DeFRaG mod stars prominently in this.

=== Movie making ===
The high-skill requirement of the game, along with the fast pace, cause that game movies are often made using content created by playing DeFRaG game modes. Within the community's tradition, especially the fastest runs, difficult trickjumping techniques are included in sequence. The DeFRaG demo-playback system includes settings to view the primary player from various angles and perspectives. This is in line with the history of the machinima phenomenon which originates from the speedrun community of Quake, the first game in the series. By following the argumentation of Stanford historian of science and technology Henry Lowood, DeFRaG can be called an instance of transformative high-performance play.

Some of these movies won gaming industry awards. For instance, the freestyle trickjumping movie Tricking iT2 by Jethro Brewin "jrb" won five Golden Llamas Awards in 2004. The categories were: Best Picture, Best Audio, Best Tech, Best Editing and Direction, and Best Quake Movie. In the following year, the trick-stunt movie Reaching Aural Nirvana by "mrks" won a Golden Llamas Award in the category Best Audio. Also in 2005, the art-house short movie defragged directed by Margit Nobis, an instance of Q3A machinima (its name is borrowed from the DeFRaG mod) was shown at numerous prestigious festivals, including the Vienna Independent Shorts festival.

== Gameplay ==
Major versions history
1.92.02 (unstable)	September 11, 2010
1.92.01 (unstable)	July 9, 2009
1.91.21	January 3, 2013
1.91.20	October 11, 2009
1.91.08	October 2, 2005
1.91.02	March 30, 2005
1.91	April 4, 2004
1.90	July 11, 2003
1.80	October 19, 2002
1.70	August 10, 2002
1.50	March 19, 2002
1.43	January 4, 2002

All maps share the common objective of finishing in the fastest time possible, but there are variations on how this is achieved. Run mode is a flat-out race to the finish line. In accuracy mode, the map is completed after a certain number of targets have been hit with the railgun (a Q3A sniper rifle). Level mode is similar to run, but the map provides a number of alternative ways of reaching the finish line. In fast caps mode, the time is measured once the flag has been taken. Training mode usually requires the successful usage of a particular technique in order to complete the level. There are also "freestyle" maps where the player may practice particular techniques without any primary objectives. The type of map can usually be seen in its name, although some do not follow this convention.

There are two game physics and ruleset modes—Vanilla Quake 3 (VQ3) and Challenge ProMode (CPM). VQ3 is an original Q3A physics and game ruleset; CPM is an altered game physics delivered from Challenge ProMode Arena modification. It provides a gamemode which includes physics allowing for better air-control, rebalanced weapons, fast weapon switching and improvements of jumping techniques.

=== Techniques ===
The completion of a DeFRaG map requires the use of a variety of trickjumping techniques. Most Training maps involve only one or two methods, but some more complicated Run and Level maps can require any number. Various map sections can require quick timing, combination, and flawless execution of several techniques.

==== Jumping techniques ====
Jumping techniques allows a player to move faster, further and/or jump higher. The most common techniques included in Q3A and DeFRaG itself includes bunny hopping, air strafing, strafe-jumping, circle-jumping, ramp-jumping, etc.

Bunny-hopping is the most basic method of fast movement where the player is jumping repeatedly instead of running in order to move faster. Strafe-jumping (SJ) is a technique necessary to complete the majority of DeFRaG maps, and is considered to be the most fundamental technique in trick jumping. It is only possible because of a specificity of the game's physics unintentionally allowing moving vectors to add up to greater acceleration. Basically, no matter if the player's character is moving on the ground (running) or is airborne (jumping), the game engine always strives to limit its speed. However, already in the original Quake, it was discovered that by non-trivial timed sequences of striking the direction keys (involving moving sideways, "strafing" in gamer language) and movements of the mouse, this limitation of speed could be overcome. As the Quake engines are the basis of many games, the possibility of strafe jumping also exists in other games. Q3A's trickjumping community developed several distinct sub-techniques including single-beat strafe-jumping, (Note: Single-beat strafe-jumping is the most common variant of strafe-jumping. The player runs forward, jumps off the ground, in addition to the forward key immediately presses and holds one of the sidestepping keys, and, by moving the mouse, looks into the same direction as the initiated sideways movement. Very shortly before hitting the ground again, the player once more hits the jump button (this way contact with the ground is minimized and friction cannot set in) and immediately strafes and looks into the other direction. By flawlessly repeating this sequence, acceleration can be increased. However, with gaining velocity, the angle of the mouselook has not only to be adjusted, but has also to be ever more precise, which makes strafe-jumping a demanding task.) single-beat strafe-jumping with airchange, (Note: Single-beat strafe-jumping with airchange is essentially the same as single-beat strafe-jumping with the difference that the direction of the sideways movement and of the mouselook is turned to the opposite side in the middle of the second jump after takeoff instead of immediately turning after the first jump. After those first two jumps, the players usually do not apply this technique anymore.) double-beat strafe-jumping, (Note: Double-beat strafe-jumping is essentially the same as single-beat strafe-jumping with the difference that the direction of the sideways movement and of the mouselook is turned to the opposite side not every, but only every second jump.) half-beat strafe-jumping, (Note: Since acceleration only depends on the vectors of input, there are alternate ways to strafe-jump. The basic idea of half-beat strafe-jumping is to reduce the mouse movement by starting with a normal strafe-jump and then continue by only pressing the sideway movement key of the other direction. The vector (and thus the place where to point the mouse) is very close to the vector of the first normal strafe-jump. Hence the name half-beat.) and inverted strafe-jumping. (Note: Inverted strafe-jumping is, since all strafing techniques are one kin, just another way to use the acceleration vectors. The idea is to only use the sideways movement keys, which will result in the exactly inverted movement of normal single-beat strafe-jumping.) The DeFRaG mod includes a helping tool, the Camping Gaz Head-Up Display (CGazHUD), that provides conveniently graphically formatted real-time feedback on acceleration and angles involved.

Circle-jumping (CJ) is based on the same principles as strafe-jumping; circle-jumping more often than not is used as the starting technique for a strafe-jumping run. (Note: In circle-jumping the player starts by facing at an angle of 90° to the direction she/he intends to go. Then she/he starts going forward, adds sideways movement into the intended direction, and simultaneously turns the mouselook into the same direction. When facing into the intended direction she or he hits the jump button, keeps pressing forward and strafe, and goes on turning the mouselook. When flawlessly executed speeds of more than 500 ups can be achieved.) Another technique involves ramped surfaces and it is called ramp-jumping; jumping on a ramped surface gives a height boost. Air strafing can be done when the player is airborne, simply staying aligned at the optimal angle in relation to where they want to go, making them go further and faster while in the air. This is one of the methods for reaching difficult places.

==== Weapon techniques ====
Weapon-jumping techniques require the player jumps off the ground and, by using the proper weapon, immediately fire a bullet (rocket, grenade, plasma or BFG plasma) onto the spot on the floor exactly or very near beneath him/her. The damage of the resulting blast delivers momentum to the player's character and propels him/her higher into the air than possible by regular jumping. The gain in momentum can be used for vertical, horizontal, and diagonal movement. In Q3A, four weapons makes self-splash damage and can be combined with each other—rocket and grenade launcher, BFG10K and plasma gun.

Rocket-jumping (RJ) is the only tricking technique using a weapon that can commonly be observed in Q3A professional deathmatch competition—in spite of the resulting cost in health with self-inflicting splash damage enabled in this game mode. Depending on the size and topography of the map and proper synchronization, two or larger number of rockets can be timed to impact on the same spot a fraction of a second after the player arrives there. Thus the player can capitalize on the added momentum furnished by the detonation of multiple projectiles, accelerate substantially and travel long distances airborne. When playing in DeFRaG's multiplayer mode, projectiles fired by other players can be used as well.

Grenade-jumping (GJ) is a technique which demands more exacting timing, because the grenade-launcher's projectile ricochets after it is launched, and its detonation is delayed. Combining more than one grenade in order to make GJ is also possible, but may require extra players due to detonation delay. BFG-jumping is a technique kin to rocket-jumping, and only insofar different as the BFG has a higher rate of fire and does more splash damage. Plasma-jumping, also called plasma-hopping, is a technique in which plasma gives slight boost to the jump.

Team tricking weapon-jumping requires teamwork with a minimum of one additional player. In DeFRaG, every weapon can be used in this technique; the other player's weapon may deliver additional momentum. The most common team techniques include gauntlet-, rocket-, grenade- and rail-jumping.

The plasma gun can be used to climb along walls (a technique called plasma-climbing). The vertical climb is the most basic variant. The successive recoil of the gun's rapid fire then lifts the player up the wall. By various combinations of direction-keys and mouselook horizontal and diagonal paths are possible as well. Expert performers can change the directions of travel en route, climb down and up again, climb along curved walls, and hit high walls from mid-air to plasma-climb in any direction.

==== Techniques exploiting bugs ====
Techniques exploiting bugs capitalize on flaws in the game engine which in some maps lend special qualities to certain locations resulting in Q3A physics anomalies.

If at particular spots the player falls from a certain height to the ground, they will be catapulted up again, although no jumppad is present (the technique is named overbounce). Overbounces can be combined with weapon techniques. The DeFRaG mod includes an "overbounce detector", a tool that helps the player to identify locations in maps where an overbounce is possible. A variety of overbounce opportunities has been discovered, made into techniques, and have been named accordingly: vertical, (Note: Vertical overbounce (VOB), sometimes referred simply as Overbounce (OB)—The player falls from a certain height, without any sideways movement whatsoever, and is propelled up vertically again without loss of damage. It occurs when a player has 0 velocity in the XY components of the velocity vector (no horizontal speed).) horizontal, (Note: Horizontal overbounce (HOB)—The player falls and has lateral movement. When hitting the ground she/he will receive substantial momentum and be catapulted in the direction of the prior lateral movement. It occurs when a player has more than 0 velocity in the XY components of the velocity vector (horizontal speed exists).) sticky, (Note: Sticky overbounce (SOB)—The gamephysics allows the players to have tiny offsets from the ground. These height changes occasionally produce new overbounce heights. Usually the sticky offset also produces an ob height to the ground the player is standing on, which can be used for small speed gains. There are two types of sticky overbounces—same height platforms and different height platforms. Same height platforms variation essentially cause the player to overbounce on the next jump, assuming that the landing will be on the same platform where the jump originates, or another platform that is at the same height. Different height platforms variation may also create an overbounce height for a platform below, for a height that is not normally an OB height. Sticky overbounces for same height platforms are useful for small speed boosts.) diagonal ("weird"), (Note: Diagonal overbounce (DOB), also called weird overbounce (WOB)—As with the horizontal overbounce, the player falls and has lateral movement. When hitting the ground she/he taps the backward-key and is propelled diagonally into the air.) zero-ups diagonal, (Note: Zero-ups diagonal overbounce (ZDOB), also called zero-ups weird overbounce (ZWOB)—An overbounce very similar to the DOB, just that it occurs if the player hits the ground with zero X- and Y-axis speed and adds a very small movement at that very frame. This will result in a propelling comparable to the DOB, but more efficient.) and slippery diagonal overbounce. (Note: Slippery diagonal overbounce (SDOB)—When the player hits a slippery surface out of an overbounce height with a small speed from 1 to 6 Quake ups, he/she will be propelled diagonally into the air, basically behaving like a DOB or a ZDOB.)

At certain locations when a player steps near a wall and jumps to it he/she will end up "sticking" to the wall in mid-air. Now the player can perform a speed-gaining technique like strafe-jumping without his/her character moving from the spot, but "accelerating" nevertheless. This is a real anomaly as the player character does not move in the game, but the engine ascribes an ever higher speed to it. The player then can "unstick" from the wall by firing a splash damage weapon into it, and subsequently will move with the speed gained "on the spot". This technique is called "sticky wall" or "rebounce".
