= Abel & Baker =

- Industry: Digital marketing
- Predecessor: Speedway Digital Army; Out There Communication; Nation
- Founded: 1999; Stockholm, Sweden
- Defunct: 2003
- Area served: Europe
- Number of employees: 150+

Abel & Baker was a digital marketing agency that has since become a part of the group DigitasLBi, a part of the Publicis Groupe.

== History ==
Abel & Baker was formed in 1999 from a merger of the three digital agencies Speedway Digital Army, Out There Communication and Nation. The agency had offices in Stockholm, Malmö, Copenhagen, Helsinki, London and Paris. The agency closed down in 2002 following the IT crash, and the London operations were acquired by Wheel: Group. The Abel & Baker brand was used until 2003, when Wheel: redesigned its group structure. Wheel: was acquired by LBi in 2006, and LBi and Digitas were subsequently both acquired by Publicis Groupe and were merged to form DigitasLBi in 2013.
