= Challenge ProMode Arena =

- Logo
- Developer: CPMA team The Promode Team
- Designers: Concept; Richard "Hoony" Sandlant Gameplay design leads Andrew "revelation" Wise; Richard "Swelt" Jacques; Adam "ix" Sibson; Programming – CPMA lead Kevin "arQon" Blenkinsopp; Programming – CPM; Jens "Khaile" Bergensten; Bartlomiej "HighlandeR" Rychtarski; Andrew "D!ABLO" Ryder; Art / modeling lead Christopher "4nT1" Combe
- Engine: id Tech 3 (Quake III Arena)
- Platforms: Macintosh, PC (Linux/Windows)
- Release: beta 3 / March 24, 2000; 1.0 / August 28, 2000; 1.52 / March 31, 2019
- Genre: First-person shooter
- Modes: Single player, Multiplayer

Challenge ProMode Arena (CPMA, formerly Challenge ProMode [CPM], unofficially Promode) is a freeware modification for id Software's first-person shooter computer game Quake III Arena (Q3A). CPMA includes modified gameplays that feature air-control, rebalanced weapons, instant weapon switching and additional jumping techniques. It also supports the unmodified vanilla Quake III (VQ3) physics, multi-view GameTV and demos, enhanced bots artificial intelligence, new maps, highly customisable HUD and many other features.

Challenge ProMode Arena has become the standard competitive mod for Q3A since the Cyberathlete Professional League announced CPMA as its competition mod of choice. The mod has its own division in Cyberathlete Amateur League, is used in Electronic Sports World Cup, and has its own competitions and leagues.

Promode physics have been implemented in other Q3A notable modifications—DeFRaG (DF) and Orange Smoothie Productions (OSP). Quake Live introduced Promode Quake Live (PQL) physics and ruleset which is similar to CPMA.

== Development ==
The Challenge ProMode project was created by Richard "Hoony" Sandlant in May 1999, following the release of Q3Test, the beta version of Quake III Arena. Its goals were to make a more exciting and challenging game in the hope that this would help advance Q3A as a professional sport. John Carmack, lead programmer of Q3A, suggested a more challenging version of the game might be better for professional gamers:

If there were a small set of professional rules that I agree with in theory but have chosen not to pursue because they conflict with more common play, then an official "pro mode" might make sense.

— John Carmack, October 2, 1999

Before the design team began their work the CPM team asked the community to brainstorm a list of possible changes. The designers used these suggestions in a process of tweaking and testing to develop the Challenge ProMode gameplay. Two public beta versions were then released for feedback and input from the community.

On August 28, 2000, the final version, 1.0, was released which was followed in December 2000 by the project changing its name to Challenge ProMode Arena to reflected the added multi-arena capability as Kevin "arQon" Blenkinsopp became the lead programmer.

== Game modes ==
Among typical Quake III Arena modes—Free for All (FFA), Team Deathmatch (TDM), Tournament (DM\1v1), Capture the Flag (CTF)—CPMA features new game modes: HoonyMode (HM), Not Team Fortress (NTF), arQmode (APM), Clan Arena (CA), Freeze Tag (FTAG/FT), and Capture Strike (CTFS/CS).

HoonyMode

HoonyMode is a form of tournament introduced in November 2003 which is loosely based on the rules of tennis. During the warm-up, each player chooses a spawn-point or they are randomly generated if none are chosen. One player typically has a "stronger" spawn and the other a "weaker" one. When the game begins the player with the stronger spawn is considered to have the "serve" and each player death is treated as a point. After each point is scored players and the arena are reset and a new point is played; players switch spawn-points, so the player who had the "weak" spawn for the previous point now has the "strong" one, effecting a change of serve. All in-game behaviour (i.e. weapons, physics, etc.) remains the same as in the standard deathmatch.

Not Team Fortress (NTF)

Referencing the video game Team Fortress, Not Team Fortress is a class-based form of Capture the Flag introduced in April 2004. Players spawn with no armour and weapons determined by their class with health and armour regenerating during play. By default, there are four classes—Fighter, Scout, Sniper and Tank which can all be customised by the server administrator.

arQmode

arQmode is a test mode which in 2003 became the official ruleset of Challenge ProMode, also known as PM2 (PMC or Promode Classic being PM1). The main aim of mode is to decrease the damage and knock-back of high-damage hit-scan weapons to reward use of predictive weapons as well as reduce the randomness in the spawn system. arQmode is now used to mean the development mode used to test new changes at the beta stage.

Clan Arena

Clan Arena is a team-play mode similar to Rocket Arena in which every player spawns with weaponry, health and armor and only respawns after one side has won the round by killing the opposition.

Freeze Tag

The aim of Freeze Tag is to freeze the entire enemy team. Players are frozen instead of killed and teammates can rescue them by standing next to the icy body for three seconds. This frees the player to join the battle once more.

Capture Strike

Capture Strike is a CTF–variant similar to the Threewave CTF mod. According to the official Threewave CTF manual "Capture Strike is a fast paced blend of Capture the Flag, Rocket Arena, and Counter-Strike. Teams take turns being Offence or Defence and battle until one team is dead, or the Offence team captures the flag." Each player respawns with weaponry, health and armor.

Variants

The mod features three different promode gameplays—Challenge ProMode II (CPM/PM2), ProMode Classic (PMC/PM1), and Challenge Quake3 (CQ3), as well as vanilla (i.e. standard) Quake 3 (VQ3) physics and ruleset.
