= Johnathan Wendel =

American professional esports player, handle Fatal1ty (born 1981)

Fatal1ty
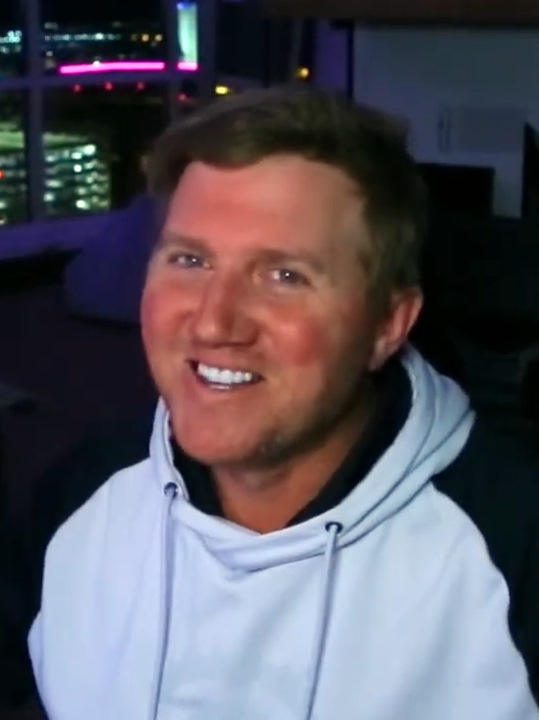
- Wendel in 2023

Personal information
- Name: Johnathan Wendel
- Born: February 26, 1981 (age 45)
- Nationality: American

Career information
- Games: Quake III and Quake IV; Aliens vs. Predator 2; Unreal Tournament 2003; Doom 3; Painkiller
- Playing career: 1999–2006

Johnathan Wendel (born February 26, 1981), also known as Fatal1ty (pronounced "Fatality"), is an American entrepreneur and former professional esports player. He made his professional debut at a 1999 Cyberathlete Professional League (CPL) tournament, securing third place and $4,000. Wendel continued to compete in CPL events, claiming multiple championships and accumulating $110,000 in prize money. His success soared in subsequent years. Wendel won the CPL World Championship for Aliens vs. Predator 2 in 2001. He became a world champion in Unreal Tournament 2003 after winning the 2002 CPL Winter event. Wendel's achievements extended to Doom 3, where he became the inaugural champion at QuakeCon 2004. In 2005, he won his fifth world title in as many video game titles, after winning the CPL World title in Painkiller, securing an unprecedented $150,000 prize. By the end of his playing career, he had amassed an esports record of $450,000 in prize winnings.

Although Wendel retired from professional play in 2006, he maintained involvement in the esports scene, making appearances at events and participating in exhibition matches. Wendel's contributions garnered widespread recognition, earning him accolades such as Lifetime Achievement Awards from the Leipzig Games Convention and the Esports Awards. He has also been inducted into the International Video Game Hall of Fame and the ESL Esports Hall of Fame.

== Playing career ==
From a young age, Wendel immersed himself in first-person shooters (FPS), such as Doom, in the early 1990s. After finishing his regular sports activities in high school during the day, he would spend hours playing Quake online at night. Additionally, he participated in Quake sessions at LAN parties and local tournaments in the Midwest. It was during this time that he became acquainted with another player named Eric "Batch" Paik, and they began meeting up every weekend to play Quake. On one occasion, Wendel defeated Paik in nine or ten consecutive matches. Paik, who had recently returned from a successful tournament in London, suggested to Wendel that he should consider competing in larger-scale tournaments. Once Wendel completed high school, he resided with his father while simultaneously attending computer classes and working part-time. However, he aspired to become a professional video game player, so he struck a deal with his father — if he failed to earn any money in his first major tournament, he would return to school.

Wendel began his professional gaming career with the first-person shooter game, Quake III Arena. In October 1999, at the age of 18, he invested $500 to participate in a Cyberathlete Professional League (CPL) tournament held in Dallas, Texas. At the event, he finished in third, winning a prize of $4,000. The following year, in 2000, he travelled to Sweden, where he competed in his first international tournament. He finished the tournament undefeated, with a record of 18 wins and zero losses. Throughout 2000, Wendel showcased his prowess in various prominent CPL events across Europe, Asia, and the United States, culminating in a triumph at the 2000 World Cyber Games in Seoul. In Quake III tournaments, he amassed a total of $110,000 in prize winnings. Wendel secured an additional of $25,000 from corporate sponsorships and endorsements, with support from companies such as Razer.

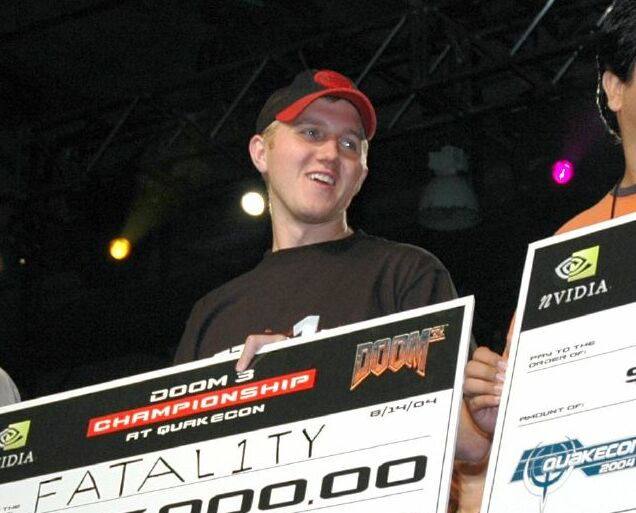
Wendel after winning the Doom 3 Championship at QuakeCon 2004

In 2001, Wendel secured a victory in the 2001 CPL World Championship for the game Aliens vs. Predator 2. As a result, he was awarded a custom-painted Ford Focus and $40,000. However, Wendel experienced a setback when he failed to qualify for the 2002 World Cyber Games, prompting him to shift his focus to a different game: Unreal Tournament 2003. He participated in the 2002 CPL Winter event held in Dallas, where he emerged as the champion, claiming the $10,000 grand prize. Another achievement in his career came in 2004 when he became the first-ever Doom 3 champion at QuakeCon 2004, securing a grand prize of $25,000. These victories solidified his position as one of the prominent figures in the esports industry during that era.

In 2005, Wendel made a transition to playing Painkiller for the 2005 CPL World Tour, a year-long tournament series that spanned across four continents and culminated in December at the Nokia Theater in Times Square, New York. In the grand finals event, which was in a double-elimination tournament format, Wendel advanced to the finals after dropping to the lower bracket. There, he faced Sander "Vo0" Kaasjager, the top-ranked Painkiller player in the world. To secure victory in the tournament, Wendel had to win two best-of-three matches, since he had already lost once in the tournament. Wendel emerged triumphant by winning four consecutive games, claiming the first-place position and an unprecedented esports cash prize of $150,000. This victory marked his fifth world title, each achieved in a different FPS game

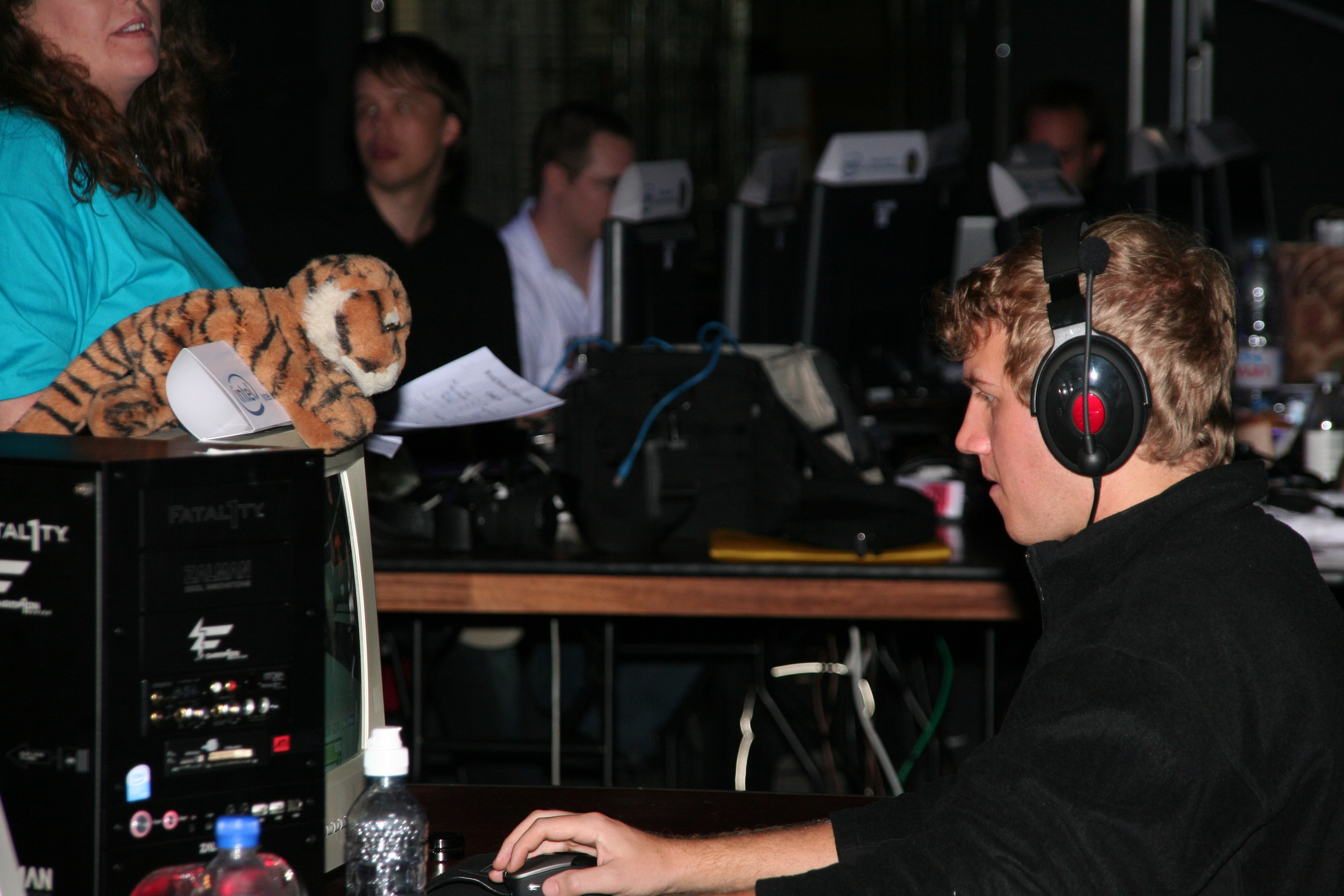
Wendel at the WSVG 2006 London event

In 2006, Wendel shifted his focus to Quake IV. Competing in the World Series of Video Games (WSVG) Finals, which adopted a double-elimination tournament structure, Wendel advanced through the lower bracket to reach the finals. His opponent in the finals was Johan "Toxjq" Quick, who boasted an undefeated record in best-of-three series. Wendel became the first player to defeat Quick by winning the first match. However, Quick emerged victorious in the second match, resulting in Wendel securing the second-place position in the event. Following the WSVG Finals, Wendel made the decision to retire from professional play due to the decline of his preferred genre in gaming.

While he retired from competitive play after 2006, Wendel continued to make appearances in various events. These included an exhibition match in 2007, participation in a Guinness World Record event in 2008/09, and a show match in Taiwan in 2012.

== Legacy ==
Throughout his career, Wendel amassed a record of $450,000 in prize winnings from seven different games, establishing a milestone in esports. This record remained unbroken for over six years following his retirement until it was surpassed by Lee "Jaedong" Jae-dong, a prominent StarCraft player, towards the end of 2013.

Recognizing his significant contributions to the world of esports, Wendel was honored with the first-ever Lifetime Achievement Award at the Leipzig Games Convention in Leipzig, Germany, in August 2007. This accolade acknowledged his exceptional sportsmanship, influential role in shaping the landscape of esports, and his international recognition as a figurehead for esports. In August 2010, Wendel was inducted into the International Video Game Hall of Fame as one of the inaugural enshrinees. Wendel's contributions were further celebrated when he was inducted into the ESL Esports Hall of Fame in November 2018. In October 2020, Wendel's enduring impact on esports was once again acknowledged with a Lifetime Achievement Award from the Esports Awards.

== Personal life ==
Wendel was born on February 26, 1981, in Kansas City, Missouri, to parents James and Judy Wendel. His upbringing took place in Kansas City, where his parents worked in auto factories, and his father also managed a pool hall. At the age of 13, Wendel experienced his parents' divorce. During his high school years, he actively participated in the school's tennis team.

In 2006, Wendel relocated to Las Vegas, Nevada, and resided on the Las Vegas Strip as of 2014.

== Media and business interests ==
=== Media appearances ===
In 2003, Jonathan Wendel gained significant exposure in mainstream media through his appearance in MTV's documentary MTV True Life: I'm a Gamer. The documentary chronicled Wendel's journey as he transitioned into playing Unreal Tournament 2003 and achieved victory at the 2002 CPL Winter tournament in Dallas. Wendel acknowledged the profound impact of the MTV show on his career, recognizing its ability to provide him ongoing exposure and media attention. He remarked, "For nine years MTV was re-airing my show. I constantly get exposure, media. You can't even pay for that. You'd pay millions to get that kind of advertisement for your company. I'm getting that for free every day." In January 2006, Wendel was featured on the news program 60 Minutes, which delved into his professional gaming career and the global explosion of esports.

=== Business ventures ===
In 2002, Wendel established his own company, Fatal1ty Inc., with the intention of reducing reliance on sponsorships to support his competitive gaming endeavors. Shortly after its inception, he generated $50,000 in sales by selling mousepads. By 2007, Wendel had forged partnerships with gaming product manufacturers such as Creative Labs, XFX, and Universal Abit, who incorporated his branding into their products. According to Wendel, the company reported royalties of approximately $5 million for the year 2006. His collaboration with Creative in 2006 introduced the Fatal1ty Gaming Headset, the first headset to feature a removable microphone, and this design innovation has since become a standard feature in gaming headsets.

In 2017, Wendel co-founded ReadyUp, a comprehensive esports team management service aimed at both amateur and professional teams. In 2023, he joined the advisory board of Glytch, a company specializing in esports and gaming venues.
