= Cyberathlete Professional League =

Professional sports tournament organization

- Sport: Esports
- Founded: June 27, 1997
- Most recent champions: X3O (CS); Team XFX (CSS)
- Most titles: SK-Gaming (7 times)
- Website: thecpl.com

The Cyberathlete Professional League (CPL) was a professional sports tournament organization specializing in computer and console video game competitions. It was established by Angel Munoz on June 27, 1997, hosting biannual tournaments in hotels. The CPL's World Tour in 2005 marked a global expansion of esports, but concerns arose about fan engagement and attracting new audiences. The post-tour era saw increased competition from the WSVG, and the CPL faced financial troubles including the loss of its main sponsor, Intel, to WSVG in 2006. Shortly after, WSVG's Matt Ringel purchased the 2006 CPL Summer event, leading to a decline in the CPL's influence. The CPL attempted a "World Season" in late 2006, hosting fewer events with reduced prize money. Rumors circulated about the league's health, and in March 2008, the CPL ceased operations. Later that year, the CPL was acquired by an investment group in Abu Dhabi, later becoming solely owned by WoLong Ventures PTE of Singapore. The CPL continued hosting annual competitions in China in collaboration with the municipal government of Shenyang.

== History ==
=== Early years (1997–1999) ===
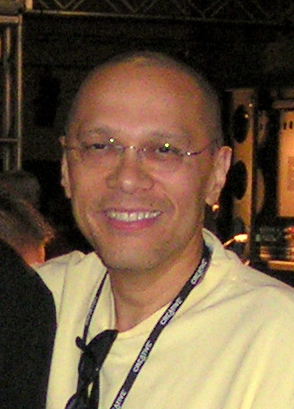
CPL founder Angel Munoz in 2005

The Cyberathlete Professional League (CPL) was launched on June 27, 1997, by gamer and former Dallas stockbroker Angel Munoz. The CPL began hosting twice-yearly tournaments, Summer and Winter, in hotels such as the Gaylord Texan Resort on the outskirts of Dallas. The first event, called The FRAG, attracted 300 players competing for a prize pool of $4,000 in merchandise, as sponsors in computing found it easier to contribute spare graphics cards rather than cash. Munoz convinced Quake professional player Stevie Case to join the league in July 1997, becoming its first signed professional gamer. Case eventually became one of the league's original founders.

The second major event, aptly named "The CPL Event," was held in July 1998 at the Dallas Infomart, and the third event, named FRAG 2, occurred in October 1998 at the Hyatt Regency in downtown Dallas. The move to the Hyatt offered advantages such as increased space, a more suitable environment for LAN events, and the introduction of the CPL's first 24-hour "Bring Your Own Computer" (BYOC) event. The Hyatt Regency in Dallas would become the chosen site for 13 CPL events spanning from 1998 to 2003. The Grand Ballroom of the Westin Park Central Hotel hosted the next CPL event, "Extreme Annihilation," departing from the familiar Hyatt Regency. The event attracted sponsors such as Babbage's, Cisco Systems, and Dell Computer Corporation. Babbage's increased support, offering 600 free spectator passes and a $5,000 prize for the Quake II tournament.

The next CPL event was the "Extreme Annihilation" in March 1999. Following "Extreme Annihilation", CPL collaborated with Interplay Entertainment for the 1999 Descent III Championship and Lanfest in Las Vegas. Despite offering the largest prize purse in professional gaming to date, $50,000, the event faced challenges, including slow registrations and venue concerns. Monte Fontenot, CPL Director of Events, emphasized that Las Vegas was not an ideal venue for gamers, and the game choice, Descent III, lacked broad appeal. The CPL then moved on to its sixth event, "Ground Zero," in New York City, which was preceded by the first-ever esports qualifier in Springfield, Virginia. Ground Zero also was the introduction of the first official female gaming competition, the Female Frag Fest 99. Ground Zero marked CPL's emergence into mainstream media, attracting both positive and negative attention from outlets such as Rolling Stone, Wired Magazine, and The Wall Street Journal. Following Ground Zero, the CPL hosted its fourth event of 1999, FRAG 3, returning to Dallas. The Hyatt Regency hosted the event in its basement.

=== Expansion and emergence of Counter-Strike (2000–2004) ===
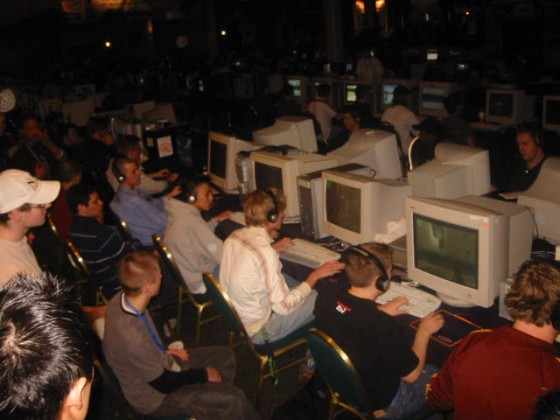
2001 Winter CPL Counter-Strike tournament at Dallas, Texas

A total of seven CPL tournaments took place in 2000. In the early days of the CPL, death match free-for-all games, such as Quake, were the most popular titles. However, a Dallas pizzeria owner named Frank Nuccio eventually persuaded CPL event organizer Monte Fontenot to include Counter-Strike in CPL events. Counter-Strike's first appearance in the CPL was at the $100,000 Razer CPL Event, which was originally scheduled for Los Angeles in March 2000 but was relocated to Marsalis Hall at the Hyatt Regency in Dallas.

CPL divisions were established in Europe and Asia, with negotiations underway for divisions in Australia, in 2000. While CPL Asia's first and only event in Singapore attracted players from overseas, organizational challenges and scheduling conflicts led to the discontinuation of CPL Asia. Plans for future events were repeatedly postponed until the CPL severed ties with the organizer in 2003. The CPL Denmark event in October 2000 marked the debut of the CPL Europe division, combining the CPL France and CPL Scandinavia events. Eurogamer described the event as a "disastrous false-start." Munoz attributed the problems to the Swedish organizers and plans were underway for CPL Europe under new management. After the setback in Denmark, the CPL found new European partners, leading to a second CPL Europe event in December 2000 in Cologne, Germany. Following first CPL Europe event, the CPL hosted the CPL Gateway Country Challenge, an event hosted simultaneously in 320 Gateway Country stores across the United States. The event, which began on November 4, 2000, and featured the video game Midtown Madness 2, had 10,000 competitors, $300,000 in prizes, and became the largest PC tournament in history.

The final event of 2000 was Babbage's CPL at the Hyatt Regency in Dallas. The event faced challenges from the outset, as a winter storm in Texas caused travel delays for participants. Only 240 of the expected 512 Quake III competitors checked in, leading to a delayed start for the tournament. In contrast, the Counter-Strike tournament was at full capacity with 40 teams. Additionally, Karna, the parent company of Razer and sponsor of the Babbage's CPL Counter-Strike tournament, failed to fulfill its end, resulting in winners receiving only 2/3 of their prize winnings.

In 2001, Nuccio became the commissioner of the CPL, and March of that year, he integrated his online Counter-Strike league, Domain of Games, into CPL, forming the Cyberathlete Amateur League (CAL). Initially focused on Counter-Strike, CAL expanded to include Quake III Arena and Unreal Tournament. On March 14, the CPL announced a that it would be dropping Quake III Arena as the official tournament game in the World Championship Event in December, and named Counter-Strike as its replacement. Moreover, the Speakeasy CPL Event in April 2001 marked a departure from the CPL's traditional focus on Quake III Arena, hosting only a Counter-Strike tournament. Additionally, a beta version of Half-Life TV (HLTV) was introduced at the event, creating a multicast spectator mode to allow an unlimited number of viewers to watch games.

Two international CPL events, the CPL Atomic Event in Melbourne, Australia, in April and the Virtua CPL Latin America Event, which was held shortly after the US Speakeasy Event, faced controversy, leading to no subsequent events hosted by those partners. The European division, however, did well, with CPL Europe hosting the Pentium 4 CPL Holland Event in May 2001. The United States' CPL 4-Year Anniversary Event, which was scheduled for June 28, 2001, celebrated CPL's four-year milestone and feature a return to Quakeworld as the primary focus, alongside other tournaments, including Counter-Strike. Over 900 attendees turned out, surpassing expectations, with the Counter-Strike tournament acting as a qualifier for the upcoming CPL World Championship Event. During the five-month break before the World Championship Event, CPL Europe hosted several events in August, including the ELSA CPL European Championships in London and the CPL Berlin Event. The CPL Berlin, held at the ICC Center, was CPL Europe's first exclusively Counter-Strike event. The CPL World Championship Event in December 2001 was filmed by ESPN. In an attempt to legitimize esports as a professional sport, players were required to use their surnames in competition instead of gaming aliases. The main event of the World Championship was the Counter-Strike tournament, which was sponsored by Razer with $10,000 in prize money.

Nuccio parted ways with the CPL in 2004 due to philosophical differences on the optimal approach to advancing the industry, as Nuccio advocated for reinvesting profits into a national league structured around geography. Munoz, however, chose to maintain the CPL's safe and profitable two-a-year tournament plan.

=== World Tours (2005–2008) ===
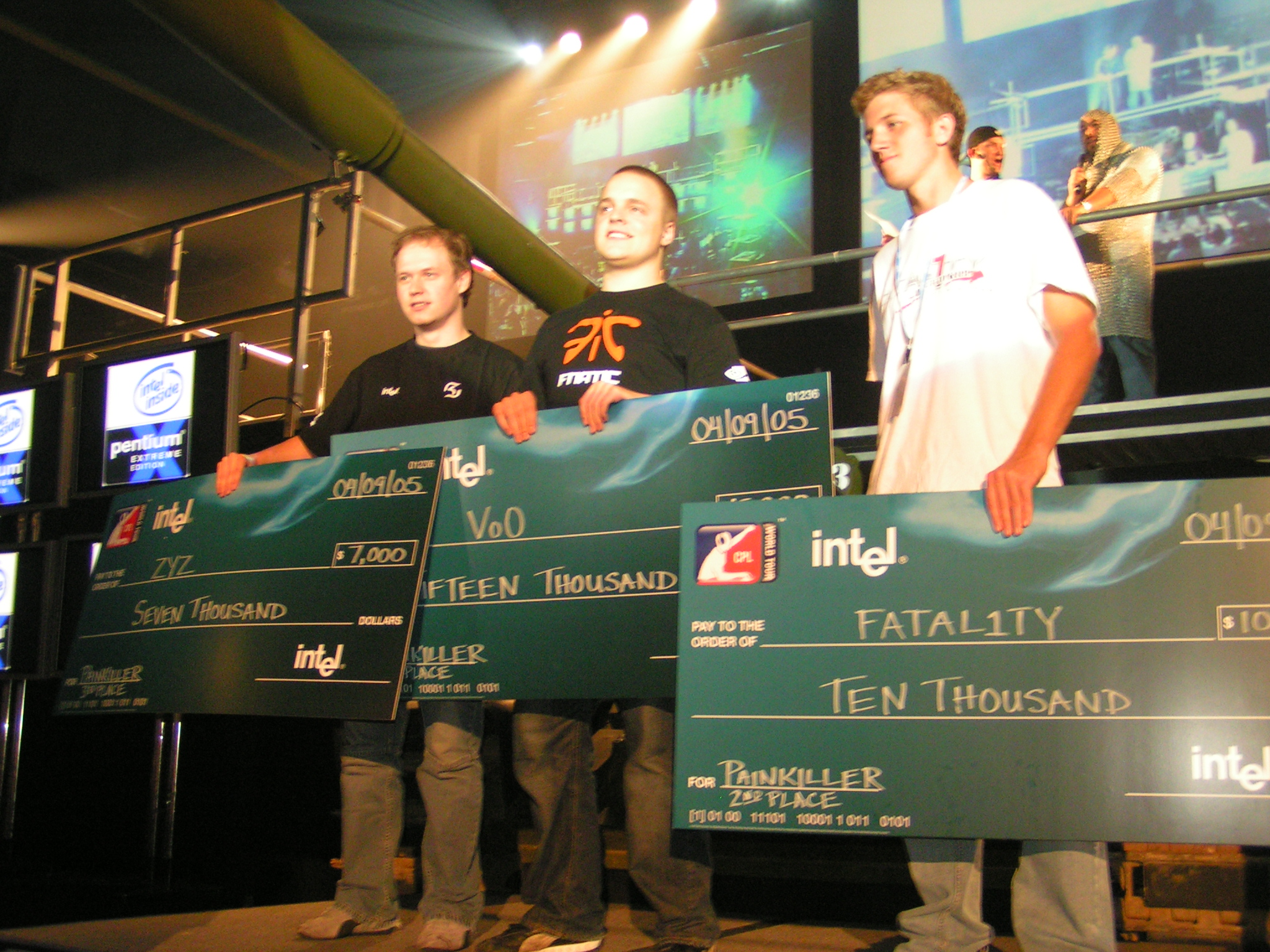
Painkiller top-placed finishers at the 2005 CPL World Tour UK. From left to right: ZyZ, Vo0, and Fatal1ty.

In 2005, the CPL held the 2005 CPL World Tour, a significant moment signaling the global expansion of esports. Centered around the new FPS game Painkiller, the tour featured ten stops across four continents, culminating in a grand final in Times Square, New York, with a million-dollar prize pot and MTV broadcasting. However, competition arose between broadcasting entities, and TSN secured the contract to broadcast the CPL World Tour, sidelining Radio iTG. Despite this setback, the tour showcased an rivalry between Fatal1ty and Dutch FPS player Sander "Vo0" Kaasjager, and ultimately, the tour was considered a success.

The 2005 CPL World Tour, despite its lucrative prize pool, raised concerns about fan engagement and attracting new audiences. Attendance at events varied, with notable success in China but disappointment in places like CPL Sheffield, where turnout was meager. The post-World Tour era saw the CPL's challenges intensify, especially with the emergence of a new league, the World Series of Video Games (WSVG), operating on a similar business model—charging players for a spot at a Bring Your Own Computer LAN. Led by management consultant Matt Ringel, WSVG recruited a dozen former CPL staff to organize events, starting with a competition near Louisville, Kentucky, in February 2006.

In the months leading up to CPL Summer 2006, scheduled for July, the CPL lost its main sponsor, Intel, to the WSVG. With the need for sponsors to support the summer event, Munoz managed to secure less lucrative deals with microchip maker AMD and graphics-card company ATI. While these agreements were sufficient to salvage one tournament a year, it could only fund the smaller and less costly event, CPL Winter at the Hyatt. WSVG's Ringel seized the opportunity and purchased the summer event from Munoz for just under a million dollars. This move proved to be a safe bet for the WSVG, given that the CPL already had three thousand gamers registered at $100 each, instantly recouping $300,000 of the million-dollar investment. Despite being labeled as a partnership between the CPL and WSVG, four days prior to the start of the event, Ringel removed all references to the CPL and renamed the event the Intel Summer Championship, aligning it with his principal sponsor.

After its Summer event was absorbed by the WSVG, the CPL ran a subdued "World Season" in late 2006, featuring a few scattered stops across the globe, a significantly reduced prize pool of $150,000, and only two games: Counter-Strike and Quake 3.Subsequently, the CPL hosted only one tournament in Dallas, CPL Winter 2007, and a World Tour final in London in early 2008. During this period, rumors circulated about the league's declining health. On the ESReality.com forums, gamers posted pictures of the Titanic, reflecting the sentiment surrounding the CPL's decline. In March 2008, the CPL ceased operations, citing a "crowded field of competing leagues."

=== Sale of the company (2008–2010) ===
On August 25, 2008, the CPL announced that it had signed an acquisition agreement with an investment group based in Abu Dhabi, United Arab Emirates. On April 2, 2010, former CPL employee Tonya Welch shared concerns about the CPL's new management. She argued that the claim of the CPL being bought by a middle-eastern investment group from Abu Dhabi was untrue and fabricated to deceive previous owners, potential investors, the gaming community, and the public. According to Welch, the actual purchase was orchestrated by a private group of US investors. On August 23, 2010, the former parent company of the CPL, announced that the two-year acquisition process of the CPL was finalized, and that the sole owner of the CPL (and its subsidiaries) was now WoLong Ventures PTE of Singapore. Following this acquisition, the CPL has hosted annual competitions in China, in collaboration with the municipal government of Shenyang. The new company also was renamed to Cyberathlete Pte Ltd.

== Past CPL World Champions ==
Year	Event	Date(s)	Location	Game	Winner	Ref.
1997	The FRAG	October 31 – November 2	Dallas, Texas	Quake	Tom "Gollum" Dawson	
1998	The CPL Event	July 23–26	Dallas, Texas	Quake	Dan "RiX" Hammans	
1998	FRAG 2	October 30 – November 1	Dallas, Texas	Quake 2	Dan "RiX" Hammans	
1999	Extreme Annihilation	March 12–14	Dallas, Texas	Quake 3	Kurt "Immortal" Shimada	
1999	Descent 3 World Championships	August 26–29	Las Vegas, Nevada	Descent 3	Chris "Fatal" Bond	
1999	GroundZero	September 9–12	New York City, New York	Quake 3	Mark "Wombat" Larsen	
1999	GroundZero	September 9–12	New York City, New York	Quake 3 – Female	Anne "Lilith" Chang	
1999	FRAG 3	October 29–31	Dallas, Texas	Quake 3	Amir "Hakeem" Haleem	
2000	Razer CPL Event	April 13–16	Dallas, Texas	Quake 3	Johnathan "Fatal1ty" Wendel	
2000	FRAG 4	September 28 – October 1	Dallas, Texas	Quake 3 – Team	Clan Kapitol	
2000	FRAG 4	September 28 – October 1	Dallas, Texas	Quake 3 – Female	Cary "Succubus" Szeto	
2000	Gateway Country Challenge	November 4–12	Gateway Country Stores	Midtown Madness 2	John Michael Benedict	
2000	Babbage's CPL Event	December 14–17	Dallas, Texas	Counter-Strike	Team e9	
2000	Babbage's CPL Event	December 14–17	Dallas, Texas	Quake 3	John "ZeRo4" Hill	
2000	Babbage's CPL Event	December 14–17	Dallas, Texas	Quake 3 – Female	Cary "Succubus" Szeto	
2001	Speakeasy CPL Event	April 12–17	Dallas, Texas	Counter-Strike	Team X3	
2001	CPL Pentium 4 Invitational	May 22–24	Dallas, Texas	Counter-Strike	Team X3	
2001	CPL 4-Year Anniversary Event	June 28 – July 1	Dallas, Texas	Quakeworld	Harley "HarlsoM" Gray	
2001	CPL World Championship Event	December 5–9	Dallas, Texas	Counter-Strike	Ninjas in Pyjamas	
2001	CPL World Championship Event	December 5–9	Dallas, Texas	Aliens Versus Predator 2	Johnathan "Fatal1ty" Wendel	
2002	Nostromo Exhibition Tournament	May 22–24	Los Angeles, California	Quake 3	John "ZeRo4" Hill	
2002	CPL Pentium 4 Summer Championship 2002	July 20–24	Dallas, Texas	Counter-Strike	Schroet Kommando	
2002	CPL Pentium 4 Winter Event 2002	December 18–22	Dallas, Texas	Counter-Strike	Team 3D	
2002	CPL Pentium 4 Winter Event 2002	December 18–22	Dallas, Texas	Unreal Tournament 2003	Johnathan "Fatal1ty" Wendel	
2002	CPL Pentium 4 Winter Event 2002	December 18–22	Dallas, Texas	Team Fortress Classic	Vindicate	
2003	CPL Pentium 4 Summer 2003 Championship	July 30 – August 3	Dallas, Texas	Counter-Strike	Schroet Kommando	
2003	CPL Pentium 4 Winter 2003 Championship	December 16–20	Dallas, Texas	Counter-Strike	Schroet Kommando	
2003	CPL Pentium 4 Winter 2003 Championship	December 16–20	Dallas, Texas	Halo PC	[Xeno]	
2004	Cyberathlete Extreme Summer Championships	July 28 – August 1	Dallas, Texas	Counter-Strike	EYE	
2004	Cyberathlete Extreme Summer Championships	July 28 – August 1	Dallas, Texas	Halo	Team Wat?	
2004	Cyberathlete Extreme Summer Championships	July 28 – August 1	Dallas, Texas	Call of Duty	United 5	
2004	Cyberathlete Extreme Summer Championships	July 28 – August 1	Dallas, Texas	Unreal Tournament 2004	Schroet Kommando	
2004	Cyberathlete Extreme Summer Championships	July 28 – August 1	Dallas, Texas	Painkiller	Sander "Vo0" Kaasjager	
2004	Cyberathlete Extreme Winter Championships	December 15–19	Dallas, Texas	Counter-Strike	NoA	
2004	Cyberathlete Extreme Winter Championships	December 15–19	Dallas, Texas	Painkiller	Sander "Vo0" Kaasjager	
2004	Cyberathlete Extreme Winter Championships	December 15–19	Dallas, Texas	Doom 3	Yang "RocketBoy" Meng	
2004	Cyberathlete Extreme Winter Championships	December 15–19	Dallas, Texas	Day of Defeat	Highball	

== Cyberathlete Amateur League ==
The CPL also owned and operated an online video game league for amateur players and teams, named the Cyberathlete Amateur League or CAL. CAL operated year-round, with regular eight-week seasons, one or two matches per week, and a single-elimination postseason (playoffs).

The CAL was based mainly on online game play. A 2003 competition hosted by CAL was played in a Hyatt Regency Ballroom. Several tables were placed together where 10 computers were set up for the professional gamers. The game was Half-Life: Counterstrike. The CAL ceased operating in 2009. By 2004, CAL had over 200,000 players competing in its league.

On November 14, 2008, the newly formed CPL Holding Group, LLC from United Arab Emirates announced that it had acquired CAL. On February 22, 2009, CAL ceased online operations. At its peak CAL was one of the largest online gaming leagues in North America with 20,000 teams and over 600,000 registered players.
