= Painkiller (video game) =

2004 first-person shooter video game

- Developer: People Can Fly
- Publisher: DreamCatcher Interactive
- Director: Adrian Chmielarz
- Designers: Adrian Chmielarz; Michał Sadowski
- Programmer: Bartek Sokołowski
- Writers: Adrian Chmielarz; Jeremy Bell; Russell Challenger; Brian Gladman
- Composers: Adam Skorupa; Marcin Czartyński
- Platforms: Microsoft Windows; Xbox
- Release: Microsoft Windows; NA: April 12, 2004; PAL: April 16, 2004; Xbox; WW: July 25, 2006
- Genre: First-person shooter
- Modes: Single-player, multiplayer

Painkiller is a first-person shooter video game developed by Polish game studio People Can Fly and published by DreamCatcher Interactive in April 2004 for Microsoft Windows and ported to Xbox in 2006. The game's single player campaign follows a dead man in Purgatory who is offered a deal to defeat the invading forces of Lucifer's army in exchange for being allowed to enter Heaven. The game was particularly well-received for its multiplayer experience and was featured for two seasons on the Cyberathlete Professional League's World Tour. A reboot with the same title was released in October 2025.

== Gameplay ==
The game is inspired by first-person shooters such as Quake, Doom and Serious Sam, with the emphasis on killing large numbers of monsters. The game is divided into five chapters, each about five levels long. The player's objective is to get through each level, from start to finish, by slaughtering hundreds of monsters. Fighting monsters often occurs in mass battles, where the player has to fight an attack by a swarm of enemies in a large room, while the exits shut and heavy metal music plays in the background, and after such a battle, the player passes a "checkpoint" which advances the game, the exits open up again, and the music returns to the usual softer tune played in the level. One of the game's most important aspects is its diversity, with each level presenting a new location with various themes and graphic styles. The levels include castles, monasteries, an opera house, graveyards, and more. Monsters are also very different, with new ones almost every level. There are five "boss" levels where the player fights a boss.

The game presents an option to complete a special task each level, which results in the player getting a "tarot card", a rare, hard-to-obtain bonus. Each equipped card provides different bonuses for a small amount of time (30 seconds), like powered-up weapons or slow motion.

The game also features a multiplayer component which can be played via LAN or online. It includes classic modes like Deathmatch and Capture-the-Flag. Online support for the Xbox version shut down in April 2010, although it is now playable on the replacement Xbox Live servers called Insignia.

== Plot ==
The game revolves around a young man named Daniel Garner (Cam Clarke), who is happily married to his wife Catherine (Vanessa Marshall). At the start of the game, Daniel is about to take Catherine out for a birthday meal. As they drive towards their destination at high speed, in the pouring rain, Daniel takes his eyes off the road to look at his wife and while his attention is diverted, he ploughs their car into a truck. Both of them are killed instantly in the crash.

While Catherine manages to make it to Heaven and lives in harmony, Daniel is trapped in Purgatory. One day, an angel called Samael (John Cygan) tells him that in order to receive purification, he has to kill four of Lucifer's generals in order to prevent a war between Heaven and Hell. Lucifer has been secretly organizing a massive army that could overwhelm Heaven, taking over Purgatory in the process. Small portions of the army are already beginning the march. With little choice available to him, Daniel accepts the task. With the forces of Hell seizing and corrupting various parts of Purgatory, Daniel goes through different and random phases of history within Purgatory, which range greatly from ancient times to the modern era, including Medieval Europe, Babylon, the Crusades, the 1800s, and a time slice of modern industry.

After killing the first general, Daniel meets a woman named Eve (also voiced by Marshall), another soul who has been in Purgatory for a long time. She gives him information about the whereabouts of the remaining generals and small elements of Lucifer's army already mobilizing. She also tells him about life in Purgatory, and the possibility that he could be dragged to Hell should he fall in battle and become lost forever. While this is all understood, what Daniel does not understand is why he came here, but Eve insists it is because of something in his past, and it is up to him to find out.

After the second general's defeat and reuniting with Eve, Daniel travels to meet a demonic friend named Asmodeus (Jim Ward), for information about new rallying positions for Lucifer's armies. Asmodeus once saved Daniel's life after he single-handedly defeated four demons at once one day, almost losing himself in the process. Eve is wary of Asmodeus and questions as to why he did not finish off Daniel when he was weak, but he insists that he did not come to Purgatory to fill the graves with lost souls like the others. He also questions Eve if she is really "The Eve" referenced in the Bible, to which Daniel jokes "Where is Adam?" before continuing on.

After the third general's defeat, he confronts Samael, having had enough of the fighting and wanting out of Purgatory, but Samael remains firm with Daniel that it is not that simple to leave and he must finish the task given to him. After being directed to the whereabouts of Alastor (Jim Cummings), Lucifer's right-hand and final general, Daniel is warned that Alastor is already aware that he is being pursued and his own elite soldiers are prepared and waiting. Daniel reluctantly continues his quest for purification.

After Daniel kills Alastor, Eve arrives at the scene in shock, realizing Lucifer will no doubt be on his way and they should make themselves ready. Surprisingly, Asmodeus arrives, complimenting Daniel for his victory and examining the scene. Suddenly, both Eve and Daniel find Asmodeus highly suspicious and try questioning him as to why he is really in Purgatory, to which he eventually replies, "I dig graves". Suddenly, he dissolves into a ball of fire and Lucifer himself (Lex Lang) appears. He mocks Daniel while recognizing him as a worthy opponent and thanking him for removing Alastor, who had been constantly arguing with Lucifer that the armies should have attacked sooner rather than wait. He snatches Eve, whom he claims had escaped from Hell, and takes her with him before disappearing back into Hell.

Samael appears, congratulating Daniel for his success and informs him his task is done. Now he may proceed to Heaven and reunite with Catherine. But Daniel refuses, knowing that it is not over yet, "not even close" to use his words. He also knows that it would be only a matter of time before Lucifer can fledge a new and massive enough army, but the next time would be far worse. He decides to go after them, but Samael tries to make him reconsider, for if Daniel goes to Hell, there will be no escaping from there. Daniel turns down the offer once more and asks that Catherine be told not to wait for him, for he will not be coming. Samael gives in and shows him the direction to the gates of Hell, warning that they are protected from the inside by the most elite of the demonic forces for the purpose of keeping the souls of those who are damned within Hell.

Daniel eventually emerges in Hell, a twisted landscape made of torn fragments from various wars throughout human history (a play on the phrase "War Is Hell"). After vanquishing enough souls of the damned, most of which are recognizable as foes he has defeated, he confronts Lucifer in Demon Mode and kills him, rescuing Eve in the process, who has been rendered unconscious. After killing Lucifer, Alastor reappears before him, with hordes of demons around him. Daniel learns that he did not really kill Alastor as he could only be defeated in Hell. With Lucifer gone, the position of Hell's ruler is open. Alastor has already taken it and announced his ultimatum. He leaves Daniel to the mercy of the demons around him, who eagerly accepts the challenge. The game ends with Daniel defending himself against the never-ending hordes.

If the game is finished in Trauma (the hardest difficulty in the game), an extra ending is presented. Daniel is now finally able to go to Heaven and reunite with Catherine.

== Release ==
The Special Edition release is a budget version of the game. It includes only 12 of the 24 levels in the full game, no full-motion videos, and no multiplayer mode. It does, however, show its award-winning features on the front case like PC Gaming World Game of the Year, Game Informer game of the month and GameSpy's editor's choice.

The Gold/Black Edition combines the Battle Out of Hell expansion with the original game onto a single disc. It also features mapping and editing tools, a limited edition Penny Arcade poster, a making-of movie, and behind the scenes interviews, and the latest patch which adds new features to the game and brings its quality up to competition standard (see below). The technical difference is that the Gold Edition has the game over six CDs, while the Black Edition has the game on DVD.

- The Universe/Triple Dose edition was released July 8, 2008. The original game, as well as the Battle Out of Hell and Overdose packages, are all contained in one case.
- The Pandemonium Edition contains the original game as well as its three expansions Battle Out of Hell, Overdose and Resurrection.
- The Collection contains all Painkiller Games with their expansions Black Edition, Overdose, Resurrection, Redemption, Recurring Evil, Hell & Damnation (with all DLC content). It also features mapping and editing tools. All games require Steam if they are purchased in the Collection.

=== Ports ===
In 2006 the game was ported by People Can Fly to the Xbox as Painkiller: Hell Wars. While not a straight port, it is actually a mix of the game and its expansion, Painkiller: Battle Out of Hell. Painkiller: Hell Wars was also announced for the PlayStation Portable and PlayStation 2. However, both versions were cancelled worldwide. The publisher of Painkiller: Hell Wars was DreamCatcher Interactive. Painkiller: Purgatory (HD) was developed by Machineworks Northwest (level design by Med-Art) for Android and iOS.

== Expansions ==
Overview of expansions in the Painkiller series
| Title | Release | Windows | Consoles | Developer | Publisher | Note |
|---|---|---|---|---|---|---|
| Painkiller: Battle Out of Hell | 2004 | Yes | No | People Can Fly | DreamCatcher Interactive | Requires base game |
| Painkiller: Overdose | 2007 | Yes | No | Mindware Studios | DreamCatcher Interactive | Stand-alone expansion |
| Painkiller: Resurrection | 2009 | Yes | No | Homegrown Games | DreamCatcher Interactive | Stand-alone expansion |
| Painkiller: Redemption | 2011 | Yes | No | Eggtooth Team | DreamCatcher Interactive | Stand-alone expansion |
| Painkiller: Recurring Evil | 2012 | Yes | No | Med-Art | THQ Nordic | Stand-alone expansion |

=== Battle Out of Hell ===
Painkiller: Battle Out of Hell is an expansion pack for Painkiller, released on December 1, 2004. It was developed and published by the same companies as Painkiller. Painkiller: Battle Out of Hell features an all-new 10-level single player campaign, two new weapons (with two fire modes each), new multiplayer game modes, and improved visual effects.

The story continues where the original left off: Lucifer is killed and his position as ruler of Hell is now free. Alastor, one of four hell generals Daniel Garner was assigned to kill in the original game, appears with a horde of demons and confronts Daniel, who now has to retreat with the help of Eve. Daniel's new goal is to battle out of hell and eliminate Alastor, who is now rightful ruler of the demonic forces. Before confronting his powerful enemy, Daniel visits such places as an orphanage full of possessed children, a hellish circus named Loony Park, a pirate bay, coliseums, Necropolis, and even a twisted version of World War II Leningrad. After Daniel kills Alastor, Eve absorbs Alastor's power, to Daniel's surprise. She transforms into the new ruler of hell, and thanks Daniel for allowing her to take control. Eve offers Daniel the chance to rule by her side, but Daniel refuses. Eve then invites Daniel to leave and join Catherine in Heaven, but Daniel again refuses, and begins firing his gun at Eve as the screen fades to black.

=== Overdose ===
Painkiller: Overdose is the second stand-alone Painkiller game and uses the same engine as the first. It was released for Windows on October 30, 2007, worldwide. Originally being developed by Mindware from the Czech Republic as a fan-made game mod, DreamCatcher Interactive granted the project full financial and technical support. In Overdose, the player takes the role of Belial, a half-angel, half-demon gatekeeper. The game contains 6 new weapons, 40 monster types and 16 new levels. The story is a spin-off and is said to tie wandering ends and provide a bridge between the original game and a potential sequel. On October 17, 2007, the demo was released. On October 23, 2007, DreamCatcher announced that the game had started shipping to retail stores.

The story is set just after Daniel kills Lucifer. The death of Hell's leader allows Belial, the prisoner and outcast, to escape and start his vendetta against those who imprisoned him: demonic beast Cerberus and Samael, an angel who betrayed his own kind. Belial starts his journey with killing his prison warden (and later using his head as a weapon). After traveling through various hellish places and defeating countless demons, he kills Cerberus and reaches Samael's lair. There, Belial defeats the fallen angel and rips his wings off as an act of vengeance.

=== Resurrection ===
On April 9, 2009, developer Homegrown Games and publisher DreamCatcher Interactive revealed Painkiller: Resurrection, a stand-alone expansion to the original game running on an updated PainEngine. It was released on October 27, 2009, for Microsoft Windows.

It features six new levels, and a new hero: William "Bill" Sherman, who is blown to pieces by his own C-4 payload, with which he wanted to eliminate a group of mobsters. The fact that he accidentally blew a bus full of innocent civilians means he is about to be claimed by Hell. However, he wakes up in purgatory and is tasked with redeeming his soul by battling a new demonic threat, which is revealed to be led by Astaroth, once a general of Lucifer, and Ramiel, a corrupted angel.

=== Redemption ===
Painkiller: Redemption is an add-on released on February 25, 2011, as a downloadable game. Similar to Overdose, the new expansion pack was originally a mod, created by a small group of fans under the label Eggtooth Team. Additional development was done by Homegrown Games. The publisher of Painkiller: Redemption is also DreamCatcher Interactive. It features a new heavy metal soundtrack, minor graphic changes, and six levels with nearly 6,000 enemies to kill. Painkiller Redemption features the return of Daniel Garner and Belial, both as playable characters. The development team has released free post-release support for the game, which includes extra content for multiplayer, or a new single-player chapter. Eggtooth Team did not create any new content, so the maps used are the ones originally found in Painkiller multiplayer, and all monsters are taken from previous Painkiller installments, including the final boss, who uses the model of King Alastor from Battle Out of Hell.

The game is narrated through animated text messages, and starts when Belial, the hero of Painkiller: Overdose, saves Daniel Garner from Eve, the current queen of Hell. Together, Daniel and Belial fight a big battle through her minions in Purgatory, until they have found Bill Sherman, the protagonist of Painkiller: Resurrection. With Bill's help, they are able to strike at Eve. The game ends with the surprising arrival of Samael, an angel of God who once tasked Daniel with destroying Hell's leaders. With Eve defeated, Samael plans to use the dark essence left by her to become a new ruler of Hell. The game concludes with Belial and Daniel understanding that the battle is not yet over.

=== Recurring Evil ===
Painkiller: Recurring Evil is an add-on featuring 5 new levels with about 4000 enemies. It was released digitally on February 29, 2012, by Nordic Games via Steam, and developed by Med-Art and Eggtooth.

It continues the story of Resurrection and serves as a side story for Redemption. Bill Sherman becomes the ruler of Purgatory, blessed with power of the Sword of Seraphim. However, the fallen angel Samael (now wingless after his defeat at the hands of Belial in Overdose), who took the power of Hell from Eve, steals Bill's sword and sends him to Purgatory's unexplored locations, forcing the fight to start again. Bill reaches Samael in the end of his journey, but the game ends without a fight, as the fallen angel defeats Bill. Depending on the player choosing the good or evil side, Bill is either rescued by Belial or killed by Samael.

== Development ==
The game was in development for more than 18 months.

== Reception ==
=== Critical reception ===
Reviews
| Publication | Score |
|---|---|
Painkiller
| GameSpot | 8.5/10 |
| PC Gamer | 84/100 |
| Game Informer | 8.5/10 |
| IGN | 7/10 |
| GameSpy | 4/5 |
| Metacritic | 81/100 |
| GameRankings | 82% |
Battle out of Hell
| GameSpot | 7.6/10 |
| Game Informer | 8/10 |
| IGN | 7.5/10 |
| GameRankings | 77% |
Hell Wars
| GameSpot | 7.9/10 |
| Game Informer | 7.75/10 |
| IGN | 5.2/10 |
| GameRankings | 70% |
Overdose
| GameSpot | 7/10 |
| Game Informer | 6.75/10 |
| GameRankings | 65% |

With the release of Painkiller in 2004, reception was generally positive with an average critic score of 82% at GameRankings and 81/100 at Metacritic. Painkiller was mostly praised for its simple yet entertaining first-person shooter gameplay and its varied level and artistic design. GameSpot noted the variety in levels and foes by stating "Remarkably, the eclectic variety of settings somehow ends up having a cohesive feel to it, and the variety itself is definitely to the game's credit" while GameSpy praised the graphics engine calling it "an original, muscular engine, capable of vast spectacular levels". However while IGN noted the gameplay positively, they also mentioned repetition in certain stages going on to say "simple aiming exercises seem to lack a little substance when compared to more recent shooters". IGN gave the soundtrack of the game a rating of 4/10, calling it "generic speed metal with a techno flourish", criticizing it as dated and generic. Another criticism was focused on its multiplayer aspect being similar to that of the older Quake games, being called by GameSpot as a more of a "throwback to the days of the original Quake" with the feel of "deja vu".

Upon its release, Painkiller received "PC Game of the Month" awards from Game Informer and GameSpot, "Editors Choice" from GameSpy, Computer Games Magazine, PC Zone and Computer Gaming World and "Kick Ass Product" from Maximum PC. Computer Gaming World named Painkiller the single-player first person shooter of the year, winning over games like Doom 3 and Half-Life 2. Computer Games Magazine named Painkiller the third-best computer game of 2004. The editors wrote, "Painkiller is dumb turned up to 11, but it reaches a rarefied level of dumb where it flips around to become genius." It was a runner-up for the magazine's "Best Art Direction" award. It received a runner-up position in GameSpot's 2004 "Best Shooter" category across all platforms, losing to Half-Life 2.

In May 2008, Painkiller was featured on Escapist Magazine's weekly review series Zero Punctuation. Reviewer Ben "Yahtzee" Croshaw, known for his acerbic reviews, stated that Painkiller was an example of an excellent first-person shooter game, praising its removal of aspects such as key hunting and fetch side quests in favor of "pure genocidal fun." Seemingly hours after the review, the Painkiller banner found on the Steam Store appeared on the front page, now sporting the tag "All you really need to know is that there is a gun that shoots shurikens and lightning...", a quote from the review. In 2010, UGO included the game on the list of the 42 Best Games Ever.

Battle out of Hell was also met with a positive response but with less only being an expansion pack. While some were enthusiastic over the new content, like Game Informer even saying "If I had to pick a game to be the poster child for the concept of expansion packs, Painkiller: Battle Out Of Hell might well be it", others like GameSpot found some of the levels not as interesting as the original saying "for the most part, much of the rest of the game is kind of bland" but still found "Great Painkiller gameplay mostly intact". They also pointed out longer loading times and "aggravating" puzzles.

Upon the release in 2006 of the Xbox port Hell Wars, many were generally pleased with its translation while others found some issues. IGN were not favourable towards the "Environmental textures" that "don't do much to enhance the experience" and even found the port to have additional bugs like when enemies "get stuck out of sight on a level [that] mean you can't advance until you reload your game".

Three years later in late 2007 when Overdose was released, reception, while also positive was quick to point the game's shortcomings. GameZone praised Overdose for retaining the basic gameplay elements that made the original 2004 title popular, and that it "extends the world with new weapons, enemies, bosses, and levels that will fulfill any adrenaline junkie's craving". GameSpot however were still annoyed by the long load times and unhappy with the quiet multiplayer mode but were still positive over the gameplay concluding" this old-fashioned shooter is a welcome respite from the scripted, story-driven epics littering the FPS landscape these days (and a pleasant reminder of the simple joy of shooting fiendish creeps in the face)". However, Game Informer found the game to be aged and while "there is a group out there who will find this game charming", it concluded that "their numbers might be growing thin."

=== Competitive play ===
At the end of 2004 Painkiller was chosen by the Cyberathlete Professional League to be their official 2005 World Tour game. This was slightly controversial with many esports followers and competitors due to the fact that other games had proven themselves at least as popular online multiplayer games. As the tour had already been announced as a one-on-one deathmatch format competition, Unreal Tournament 2004 and Doom 3 were also fan favourites for this tour. However, since Unreal Tournament 2004 developer Epic Games was in the process of changing publishers from Atari to Midway Games and could not guarantee their full support throughout the year-long tour, it was not chosen.

This agreement between the CPL and DreamCatcher also meant that no other organization was allowed to use Painkiller in a gaming competition with prizes above US$2,000.- without obtaining a license from the CPL. It also had effects on Painkiller beyond professional competition; a patch was released to add new features to the game and bring its quality up to competition standard. This updated version of the game also resulted in a special edition re-release of the game bearing the CPL World Tour logo, entitled Painkiller: Gold Edition in North America and Painkiller: Black Edition elsewhere. This new version contained both Painkiller and its expansion pack Painkiller: Battle out of Hell unpatched, among other additions including a video about the making of the game. However, Quake III Arena was selected as the one-versus-one deathmatch game of the CPL for 2006, replacing Painkiller.

== Remake and sequel ==
Painkiller: Hell & Damnation, developed by The Farm 51 on Unreal Engine 3, was released in 2012. It is notable for being both a partial remake of and sequel to the original title.

== Reboot ==
A reboot, named simply Painkiller, was announced on March 20, 2025. Developed by Anshar Studios and published by 3D Realms, the reboot was released on October 21, 2025, on PlayStation 5, Steam and Xbox Series X/S.
