= Blast Austin Major 2025 =

Counter-Strike 2 tournament

Blast.tv Austin Major 2025
- 2025

Tournament information
- Game: Counter-Strike 2
- Location: Austin, Texas, United States
- Dates: June 3–22, 2025
- Administrator: Valve; BLAST
- Format: Three 16-team Swiss-system group stages 8-team single-elimination playoff
- Host: BLAST (Note: Major Regional Qualifiers hosted by Relog Media (Europe MRQ), Liga Ace (Americas MRQs), ESN (Mongolia & Oceania MRQs) and GGTV (China MRQ).)
- Venue: Moody Center
- Teams: 32
- Defending champions: Team Spirit
- Purse: US$1,250,000

Final positions
- Champions: Team Vitality
- 1st runners-up: The MongolZ
- 2nd runners-up: MOUZ paiN Gaming
- MVP: Mathieu "ZywOo" Herbaut

The Blast.tv Austin Major 2025 was the third Counter-Strike 2 Major Championship and twenty-second Counter-Strike Major overall. It was held in Austin, Texas, United States, from June 3 to June 22, 2025, and it was the second Major hosted by BLAST, after Paris 2023. The tournament was held at the Moody Center, on the campus of the University of Texas at Austin, and was the first Major to feature 32 teams, involving directly-invited teams and teams from regional qualifiers. It featured a prize pool of US$1,250,000.

Team Vitality were crowned champions after a 2–1 victory over The MongolZ, their second title since Paris 2023. Mathieu "ZywOo" Herbaut was named the tournament's MVP, receiving his second such award and becoming the third player to be awarded MVP in multiple Majors after also receiving it at the Paris Major.

== Background ==
Counter-Strike 2 is a multiplayer first-person shooter video game developed by Valve Corporation. It is the fifth game in the Counter-Strike series. In professional Counter-Strike, the Valve-sponsored Majors are considered the most prestigious tournaments.

Austin was announced as the host for the first Major of 2025 during the BLAST Premier Spring Final on June 14, 2024. This is the fourth Major held in the United States and the first since Boston 2018. This is also BLAST's second Major after Paris 2023, the last held on Counter-Strike: Global Offensive.

The defending Major champions were Team Spirit, following a 2–1 victory over FaZe Clan at Shanghai 2024. They were eliminated after a quarterfinal defeat to MOUZ.

== Format ==
Like previous Majors, the tournament involves Swiss-system group stages before an eight-team single-elimination playoffs. The Major involves an additional Swiss-system group stage to accommodate the expansion from 24 to 32 teams. 16 teams overall are invited directly to the Major, including 10 from Europe, five from the Americas and one from Asia, with the remaining 16 teams qualifying from a series of Major Regional Qualifiers. The stage that teams are invited to is determined by their Valve Regional Standing. Eight teams are eliminated from each Swiss-system stage before the final eight teams compete in a single-elimination playoff bracket to determine a champion. Matches in each group stage and the initial matchups of the Playoffs Stage is seeded according to teams' Buchholz score.

In the first three stages, all matches except for progression or elimination matches, which are played as bests-of-three, are played in a best-of-one format. All matches in the Playoff Stage are played in a best-of-three format.

=== Map pool ===
- Ancient
- Anubis
- Dust II
- Inferno
- Mirage
- Nuke
- Train

== Talent ==
On May 30, 2025, BLAST announced the full talent lineup for the Major.

Hosts

- Eefje "sjokz" Depoortere (arena host)
- Tres "stunna" Saranthus (arena host)
- James Banks (desk host)
- Freya Spiers (desk host)

Analysts

- Alex "Mauisnake" Ellenberg
- Jacob "Pimp" Winneche
- Peter "dupreeh" Rasmussen
- Jason "moses" O'Toole
- Danny "mahone" Hsieh

Casters

- Mohan "launders" Govindasamy
- Conner "Scrawny" Girvan
- Chad "SPUNJ" Burchill
- Alex "Machine" Richardson
- Harry "JustHarry" Russell
- Hugo Byron
- Daniel "ddk" Kapadia
- Anders Blume

== Teams ==
=== Europe ===
- Team Vitality
- MOUZ
- Team Spirit
- Aurora Gaming
- Natus Vincere
- G2 Esports
- Team Falcons
- FaZe Clan
- 3DMAX
- Virtus.pro
- HEROIC
- OG Esports
- Nemiga Gaming
- BetBoom Team
- Metizport
- B8 Esports

=== Americas ===
- Team Liquid
- paiN Gaming
- FURIA Esports
- MIBR
- M80
- Imperial Esports
- Complexity Gaming
- Fluxo
- Wildcard
- NRG Esports
- Legacy (Note: As the runner-up in the South American Major Regional Qualifier, Legacy replaced BESTIA following reported visa issues.)

=== Asia ===
- The MongolZ
- Lynn Vision Gaming
- FlyQuest
- Chinggis Warriors
- TYLOO

== Qualification ==
The Major is the first to feature direct invites to the tournament itself since Berlin 2019, with additional teams qualifying from Major Regional Qualifiers (MRQs), replacing the previous Regional Major Ranking (RMR) tournaments. MRQs were held for Europe, the Americas and Asia, with the Americas and Asia being further divided into sub-regions. Six teams qualified from the Europe MRQ, three teams qualified from the North and South American MRQs each and a single team qualified from each Asian sub-region MRQ. (Note: The China sub-region MRQ qualified two teams to Stage 1 due to Chinese roster Rare Atom being the second highest ranked Asian team as of April 7.)

All sixteen teams who qualified from the MRQs entered Stage 1, with Stages 2 and 3 featuring eight directly invited teams based on their Valve Regional Standings (VRS) as they stood on April 7, 2025.

On May 21, 2025, BLAST announced that BESTIA, who had qualified through the South American MRQ, had been replaced by runner-up Legacy due to the organization failing to obtain enough visas for their complete roster. The decision was met with backlash from BESTIA, as well as from organizations and players attending the event. In a statement, BLAST reaffirmed the decision, stating that BESTIA had failed to meet the deadline set by the Major organizer and that the replacement had been approved by Valve.

MRQs were held online on the following dates:

- Europe: April 14–17 (co-organized with Relog Media)
- Americas: April 15–17 (co-organized with Liga ACE Esports for both North and South America)
- Asia: April 15–17 (co-organized with GG Media for China and ESN for Mongolia & Western Asia and Oceania & South East Asia)

=== Qualified teams ===
Region		Qualified Stage		
Region		Stage 1	Stage 2	Stage 3
Europe		HEROIC; OG Esports; Nemiga Gaming; BetBoom Team; Metizport; B8 Esports	Team Falcons; FaZe Clan; 3DMAX; Virtus.pro	Team Vitality; MOUZ; Team Spirit; Aurora Gaming; Natus Vincere; G2 Esports
Americas	Overall	—N/a	paiN Gaming; FURIA Esports; MIBR; M80	Team Liquid
Americas	North America	Complexity Gaming; Wildcard; NRG Esports	—N/a	—N/a
Americas	South America	Imperial Esports; Fluxo; ~~BESTIA~~	—N/a	—N/a
Asia	Overall	—N/a	—N/a	The MongolZ
Asia	Mongolia & Western Asia	Chinggis Warriors	—N/a	—N/a
Asia	Oceania & South East Asia	FlyQuest	—N/a	—N/a
Asia	China	Lynn Vision Gaming; TYLOO	—N/a	—N/a

=== Team invitations ===
On April 7, 2025, Valve released an update to their Regional Standings (VRS), determining the invites for the Stages 2 and 3 of the Major as well as the Major Regional Qualifiers (MRQs). Below are tables of each region's VRS standings as of April 7, 2025.

Regional VRS standings for teams invited to Major and MRQs (as of April 7, 2025)

Europe regional standings for invited teams (as of April 7, 2025)
Standing	Team Name	Roster (Note: Some team invites were based on outdated rosters.)	Invite
1	Team Vitality	apEX, flameZ, mezii, ropz, ZywOo	Blast.tv Austin Major Stage 3
2	MOUZ	Brollan, Jimpphat, Spinx, torzsi, xertioN	Blast.tv Austin Major Stage 3
3	Team Spirit	chopper, donk, magixx, sh1ro, zont1x	Blast.tv Austin Major Stage 3
4	Eternal Fire (Note: Eternal Fire's roster was acquired by Aurora Gaming on April 5, 2025.)	jottAAA, MAJ3R, Wicadia, woxic, XANTARES	Blast.tv Austin Major Stage 3
5	Natus Vincere	Aleksib, b1t, iM, jL, w0nderful	Blast.tv Austin Major Stage 3
6	G2 Esports	HeavyGod, huNter-, m0NESY, malbsMd, Snax	Blast.tv Austin Major Stage 3
7	Team Falcons	degster, kyxsan, Magisk, NiKo, TeSeS	Blast.tv Austin Major Stage 2
8	FaZe Clan	broky, EliGE, frozen, karrigan, rain	Blast.tv Austin Major Stage 2
9	3DMAX	bodyy, Ex3rcice, Graviti, Lucky, Maka	Blast.tv Austin Major Stage 2
10	Virtus.pro	electroNic, fame, FL1T, FL4MUS, ICY	Blast.tv Austin Major Stage 2
11	Astralis	cadiaN, device, jabbi, Staehr, stavn	Blast.tv Austin Major Europe MRQ
12	GamerLegion	PR, REZ, sl3nd, Tauson, ztr	Blast.tv Austin Major Europe MRQ
13	SAW	Ag1l, AZUWU, cej0t, MUTiRiS, story	Blast.tv Austin Major Europe MRQ
14	BC.Game	CYPHER, jkaem, nawwk, nexa, pr1metapz	Blast.tv Austin Major Europe MRQ
15	HEROIC	LNZ, SunPayus, tN1R, xfl0ud, yxngstxr	Blast.tv Austin Major Europe MRQ
16	BIG Clan	hyped, JDC, Krimbo, kyuubii, tabseN	Blast.tv Austin Major Europe MRQ
17	500	CeRq, oxygeN, Rainwaker, SHiPZ, SPELLAN	Blast.tv Austin Major Europe MRQ
18	B8	alex666, esenthial, headtr1ck, kensizor, npl	Blast.tv Austin Major Europe MRQ
19	OG Esports	Buzz, Chr1zN, F1KU, nicoodoz, spooke	Blast.tv Austin Major Europe MRQ
20	Nemiga	1eeR, khaN, riskyb0b, Xant3r, zweih	Blast.tv Austin Major Europe MRQ
21	BetBoom Team	Ax1Le, Boombl4, Magnojez, S1ren, zorte	Blast.tv Austin Major Europe MRQ
22	fnatic	blameF, fear, jambo, KRIMZ, MATYS	Blast.tv Austin Major Europe MRQ
23	PARIVISION	BELCHONOKK, Jame, nota, Qikert, TRAVIS	Blast.tv Austin Major Europe MRQ
24	9 Pandas	anarkez, d1Ledez, Krad, r3salt, shalfey	Blast.tv Austin Major Europe MRQ
25	ENCE	gla1ve, Neityu, podi, sdy, xKacpersky	Blast.tv Austin Major Europe MRQ
27	Metizport	adamb, hampus, isak, L00m1, Plopski	Blast.tv Austin Major Europe MRQ

Americas regional standings for invited teams (as of April 7, 2025)
Standing	Team Name	Roster	Invite
Overall
1	Team Liquid (Note: Although Team Liquid were ranked as both an American and Asian team, they were invited according to their higher Americas standing.)	jks, NAF, NertZ, Twistzz, ultimate	Blast.tv Austin Major Stage 3
2	paiN Gaming	biguzera, dav1deuS, kauez, nqz, snow	Blast.tv Austin Major Stage 2
3	FURIA Esports	chelo, FalleN, KSCERATO, skullz, yuurih	Blast.tv Austin Major Stage 2
4	MIBR	brnz4n, exit, insani, Lucaozy, saffee	Blast.tv Austin Major Stage 2
5	M80	Lake, reck, s1n, slaxz-, Swisher	Blast.tv Austin Major Stage 2
North America
6	Complexity Gaming	Cxzi, Grim, hallzerk, JT, nicx	Blast.tv Austin Major North America MRQ
7	Wildcard	JBa, Sonic, stanislaw, Stewie2K, susp	Blast.tv Austin Major North America MRQ
9	NRG Esports	br0, HexT, Jeorge, nitr0, oSee	Blast.tv Austin Major North America MRQ
10	BLUEJAYS	freshie, Fruitcupx, SLIGHT, snav, Wolffe	Blast.tv Austin Major North America MRQ
14	Getting Info	dea, FaNg, MarKE, nosraC, shane	Blast.tv Austin Major North America MRQ
17	Marsborne	chop, Grizz, Minus, motm, WolfY	Blast.tv Austin Major North America MRQ
19	Nouns Esports	CLASIA, Cryptic, junior, Peeping, RUSH	Blast.tv Austin Major North America MRQ
24	MIGHT	djay, jared, Louie, Snakes, Voltage	Blast.tv Austin Major North America MRQ
South America
8	Imperial Esports	cheyJESUS, decenty, noway, try, VINI	Blast.tv Austin Major South America MRQ
11	Fluxo	arT, kye, mlhzin, piriajr, zevy	Blast.tv Austin Major South America MRQ
12	Legacy	dumau, latto, lux, n1ssim, saadzin	Blast.tv Austin Major South America MRQ
13	Sharks Esports	doc, gafolo, koaal, n1cks, rdnzao	Blast.tv Austin Major South America MRQ
15	ODDIK	ksloks, matios, naitte, pancc, WOOD7	Blast.tv Austin Major South America MRQ
16	BESTIA	cass1n, luchov, Noktse, timo, tomaszin	Blast.tv Austin Major South America MRQ
18	RED Canids	coldzera, drop, felps, HEN1, venomzera	Blast.tv Austin Major South America MRQ
20	Team Solid	destiny, drg, gbb, nython, tomate	Blast.tv Austin Major South America MRQ

Asia regional standings for invited teams (as of April 7, 2025)
Standing	Team Name	Roster	Invite
Overall
1	The MongolZ	910, bLitz, mzinho, Senzu, Techno	Blast.tv Austin Major Stage 3
China
3	Rare Atom	ChildKing, kaze, L1haNg, somebody, Summer	Blast.tv Austin Major China MRQ
8	TYLOO	Attacker, JamYoung, Jee, k4Mi, Mercury	Blast.tv Austin Major China MRQ
12	Lynn Vision	C4LLM3SU3, EmiliaQAQ, Starry, Westmelon, z4kr	Blast.tv Austin Major China MRQ
20	DogEvil	B1NGO, BZA, lan, Roninbaby, Tiger	Blast.tv Austin Major China MRQ
Oceania
6	SemperFi	aliStair, keen, SaVage, shadiy, Valiance	Blast.tv Austin Major Oceania MRQ
7	FlyQuest	dexter, INS, Liazz, regali, Vexite	Blast.tv Austin Major Oceania MRQ
11	ex-TALON (Note: Talon Esports parted ways with their Counter-Strike 2 roster on March 7, 2025.)	ADDICT, BRACE, hazr, sterling, vision	Blast.tv Austin Major Oceania MRQ
14	Rooster	asap, chelleos, DannyG, sliimey, TjP	Blast.tv Austin Major Oceania MRQ
Mongolia
4	The Huns	Bart4k, cobra, nin9, Veccil, xerolte	Blast.tv Austin Major Mongolia MRQ
9	Eruption	fury5k, MagnumZ, sideffect, sk0R, xenization	Blast.tv Austin Major Mongolia MRQ
10	Chinggis Warriors	aricule, controlez, Efire, NEUZ, ROUX	Blast.tv Austin Major Mongolia MRQ
13	Gods Reign (Note: Gods Reign replaced ATOX (ranked fifth) due to a provisional suspension by ESIC, handed down on March 7, 2025.)	Bhavi, f1redup, Ph1NNN, R2B2, Rossi	Blast.tv Austin Major Mongolia MRQ

== Stage 1 ==
Stage 1 featured sixteen teams qualified from the Major Regional Qualifiers competing in a Swiss-system bracket. Teams were initially seeded according to their Valve Regional Standing, with further matches seeded according to a team's Buchholz score. Sixteen teams competed for eight Stage 2 spots, with all matches besides elimination and progression matches, which were bests-of-three, being bests-of-one.

Stage 1 was played from June 3 to June 6, 2025.

Pos	Team	W	L	RW	RL	RD	BS	Qualification
1	B8	3	0	66	44	+22	-1	Qualification to Stage 2
2	HEROIC	3	0	63	38	+25	-4	Qualification to Stage 2
3	BetBoom	3	1	67	54	+13	+1	Qualification to Stage 2
4	OG	3	1	61	29	+32	+1	Qualification to Stage 2
5	Nemiga	3	1	59	52	+7	0	Qualification to Stage 2
6	Lynn Vision	3	2	114	102	+12	-1	Qualification to Stage 2
7	Legacy	3	2	80	71	+9	-2	Qualification to Stage 2
8	TYLOO	3	2	84	68	+16	-5	Qualification to Stage 2
9	FlyQuest	2	3	91	112	-21	+5	Eliminated
10	NRG	2	3	68	88	-20	+5	Eliminated
11	Wildcard	2	3	103	119	-16	+4	Eliminated
12	Imperial	1	3	68	72	-4	+3	Eliminated
13	Chinggis Warriors	1	3	88	91	-3	+2	Eliminated
14	Complexity	1	3	44	61	-17	-1	Eliminated
15	Metizport	0	3	20	55	-35	-2	Eliminated
16	Fluxo	0	3	42	62	-20	-5	Eliminated

Updated to match(es) played on June 6, 2025. Source:

=== Matchup results ===
Stage 1 full results

Round 1 matches
Team	Score	Map	Score	Team
Complexity Gaming	3	Ancient	13	OG Esports
HEROIC	13	Anubis	7	Chinggis Warriors
B8	13	Inferno	11	Imperial Esports
BetBoom Team	13	Train	7	Nemiga Gaming
TYLOO	5	Anubis	13	NRG Esports
Lynn Vision Gaming	13	Dust II	7	Legacy
Wildcard	13	Inferno	1	Metizport
FlyQuest	13	Ancient	7	Fluxo

Round 2 matches
Team	Score	Map	Score	Team
1–0
HEROIC	13	Dust II	5	NRG Esports
B8	13	Inferno	9	OG Esports
BetBoom Team	6	Mirage	13	FlyQuest
Lynn Vision Gaming	17	Nuke	19	Wildcard
0–1
Complexity Gaming	13	Inferno	9	Fluxo
Chinggis Warriors	10	Nuke	13	Legacy
TYLOO	13	Mirage	4	Metizport
Imperial Esports	9	Train	13	Nemiga Gaming

Round 3 matches
Team	Score	Map	Score	Team
2–0 (Advancement)
HEROIC	2	Series	1	FlyQuest
B8	2	Series	1	Wildcard
1–1
BetBoom Team	13	Anubis	3	Legacy
NRG Esports	13	Inferno	9	Complexity Gaming
Lynn Vision Gaming	10	Dust II	13	Nemiga Gaming
OG Esports	13	Ancient	4	TYLOO
0–2 (Elimination)
Chinggis Warriors	2	Series	1	Fluxo
Imperial Esports	2	Series	0	Metizport

Round 4 matches
Team	Score	Map	Score	Team
2–1 (Advancement)
OG Esports	2	Series	0	NRG Esports
BetBoom Team	2	Series	0	Wildcard
FlyQuest	0	Series	2	Nemiga Gaming
1–2 (Elimination)
Imperial Esports	1	Series	2	Legacy
Complexity Gaming	0	Series	2	TYLOO
Lynn Vision Gaming	2	Series	1	Chinggis Warriors

Round 5 matches (Advancement/Elimination)
Team	Score	Map	Score	Team
NRG Esports	0	Series	2	Lynn Vision Gaming
Wildcard	0	Series	2	Legacy
FlyQuest	1	Series	2	TYLOO

== Stage 2 ==
Stage 2 featured eight teams qualified from Stage 1 and eight teams directly invited based on their Valve Regional Standing competing in a Swiss-system bracket. Directly invited teams were seeded according to their Valve Regional Standing, while teams from Stage 1 are seeded according to their final placement from that stage. Further matches are seeded according to a team's Buchholz score. Sixteen teams competed for eight Stage 3 spots, with all matches besides elimination and progression matches, which are bests-of-three, being bests-of-one.

Stage 2 was played starting from June 7 to June 10, 2025.

Pos	Team	W	L	RW	RL	RD	BS	Qualification
1	Legacy	3	0	52	35	+17	+2	Qualification to Stage 3
2	Virtus.pro	3	0	55	28	+27	-2	Qualification to Stage 3
3	paiN	3	1	75	59	+16	+7	Qualification to Stage 3
4	3DMAX	3	1	59	45	+14	+2	Qualification to Stage 3
5	FURIA	3	1	66	51	+15	0	Qualification to Stage 3
6	FaZe	3	2	90	76	+14	+1	Qualification to Stage 3
7	Nemiga	3	2	86	71	+15	0	Qualification to Stage 3
8	Lynn Vision	3	2	77	75	+2	-1	Qualification to Stage 3
9	B8	2	3	77	95	-18	+3	Eliminated
10	MIBR	2	3	105	122	-17	0	Eliminated
11	HEROIC	2	3	84	97	-13	-4	Eliminated
12	TYLOO	1	3	59	73	-14	-1	Eliminated
13	M80	1	3	46	65	-19	-2	Eliminated
14	Falcons	1	3	96	96	+0	-4	Eliminated
15	BetBoom	0	3	35	52	-17	0	Eliminated
16	OG	0	3	44	66	-22	-1	Eliminated

Updated to match(es) played on June 10, 2025. Source:

=== Matchup results ===
Stage 2 full results

Round 1 matches
Team	Score	Map	Score	Team
Team Falcons	8	Ancient	13	B8
FaZe Clan	13	Dust II	3	HEROIC
3DMAX	13	Anubis	4	BetBoom Team
Virtus.pro	13	Inferno	2	OG Esports
paiN Gaming	13	Dust II	7	Nemiga Gaming
FURIA Esports	13	Nuke	4	Lynn Vision Gaming
MIBR	10	Nuke	13	Legacy
M80	9	Train	13	TYLOO

Round 2 matches
Team	Score	Map	Score	Team
1–0
Virtus.pro	13	Inferno	3	B8
paiN Gaming	13	Dust II	11	FURIA Esports
FaZe Clan	13	Anubis	5	TYLOO
3DMAX	7	Inferno	13	Legacy
0–1
Team Falcons	9	Nuke	13	Lynn Vision Gaming
HEROIC	13	Mirage	9	BetBoom Team
MIBR	12	Ancient	16	Nemiga Gaming
M80	16	Ancient	13	OG Esports

Round 3 matches
Team	Score	Map	Score	Team
2–0 (Advancement)
FaZe Clan	0	Series	2	Legacy
paiN Gaming	0	Series	2	Virtus.pro
1–1
TYLOO	5	Anubis	13	Lynn Vision Gaming
3DMAX	13	Dust II	11	Nemiga Gaming
FURIA Esports	13	Dust II	8	M80
B8	13	Dust II	10	HEROIC
0–2 (Elimination)
MIBR	2	Series	0	BetBoom Team
OG Esports	1	Series	2	Team Falcons

Round 4 matches
Team	Score	Map	Score	Team
2–1 (Advancement)
paiN Gaming	2	Series	0	Lynn Vision Gaming
FaZe Clan	0	Series	2	3DMAX
FURIA Esports	2	Series	1	B8
1–2 (Elimination)
Nemiga Gaming	2	Series	0	M80
TYLOO	1	Series	2	HEROIC
Team Falcons	1	Series	2	MIBR

Round 5 matches (Advancement/Elimination)
Team	Score	Map	Score	Team
Nemiga Gaming	2	Series	0	HEROIC
B8	1	Series	2	Lynn Vision Gaming
FaZe Clan	2	Series	0	MIBR

== Stage 3 ==
Stage 3 featured eight teams qualified from Stage 2 and eight teams directly invited based on their Valve Regional Standing competing in a Swiss-system bracket. Directly invited teams were seeded according to their Valve Regional Standing, while teams from Stage 2 were seeded according to their final placement in that stage. Further matches are seeded according to a team's Buchholz score. Sixteen teams competed for the eight Playoffs spots, with all matches besides elimination and progression matches, which are bests-of-three, being bests-of-one.

Stage 3 was played starting from June 12 to June 15, 2025.

Pos	Team	W	L	RW	RL	RD	BS	Qualification
1	Spirit	3	0	52	24	+28	1	Qualification to Playoffs Stage
2	FURIA	3	0	52	26	+26	-2	Qualification to Playoffs Stage
3	FaZe	3	1	57	46	+11	-1	Qualification to Playoffs Stage
4	Natus Vincere	3	1	84	86	-2	-3	Qualification to Playoffs Stage
5	Vitality	3	1	55	33	+22	-7	Qualification to Playoffs Stage
6	The MongolZ	3	2	93	84	+9	-1	Qualification to Playoffs Stage
7	paiN	3	2	104	107	-3	-4	Qualification to Playoffs Stage
8	MOUZ	3	2	127	129	-2	-5	Qualification to Playoffs Stage
9	Virtus.pro	2	3	78	106	-28	+6	Eliminated
10	Legacy	2	3	94	80	+14	+2	Eliminated
11	G2	2	3	101	105	-4	0	Eliminated
12	Aurora	1	3	53	68	-15	+5	Eliminated
13	3DMAX	1	3	50	63	-13	+4	Eliminated
14	Lynn Vision	1	3	48	59	-11	0	Eliminated
15	Nemiga	0	3	41	60	-19	+5	Eliminated
16	Liquid	0	3	52	65	-13	0	Eliminated

Updated to match(es) played on June 13, 2025. Source:

=== Matchup results ===
Stage 3 full results

Round 1 matches
Team	Score	Map	Score	Team
Team Vitality	3	Inferno	13	Legacy
MOUZ	11	Mirage	13	Virtus.pro
Team Spirit	13	Dust II	3	paiN Gaming
G2 Esports	5	Nuke	13	3DMAX
The MongolZ	11	Inferno	13	FURIA Esports
Aurora Gaming	13	Anubis	5	FaZe Clan
Natus Vincere	13	Train	7	Nemiga Gaming
Team Liquid	5	Dust II	13	Lynn Vision Gaming

Round 2 matches
Team	Score	Map	Score	Team
1–0
Aurora Gaming	7	Dust II	13	FURIA Esports
Legacy	11	Ancient	13	Virtus.pro
Team Spirit	13	Dust II	7	Lynn Vision Gaming
Natus Vincere	16	Inferno	14	3DMAX
0–1
Team Vitality	13	Dust II	6	Nemiga Gaming
MOUZ	10	Ancient	13	FaZe Clan
G2 Esports	13	Dust II	6	paiN Gaming
The MongolZ	13	Ancient	7	Team Liquid

Round 3 matches
Team	Score	Map	Score	Team
2–0 (Advancement)
FURIA Esports	2	Series	0	Virtus.pro
Team Spirit	2	Series	0	Natus Vincere
1–1
Legacy	8	Anubis	13	FaZe Clan
3DMAX	2	Nuke	13	Team Vitality
Aurora Gaming	4	Inferno	13	G2 Esports
The MongolZ	13	Nuke	7	Lynn Vision Gaming
0–2 (Elimination)
MOUZ	2	Series	1	Team Liquid
paiN Gaming	2	Series	1	Nemiga Gaming

Round 4 matches
Team	Score	Map	Score	Team
2–1 (Advancement)
The MongolZ	0	Series	2	FaZe Clan
Virtus.pro	0	Series	2	Team Vitality
Natus Vincere	2	Series	1	G2 Esports
1–2 (Elimination)
Legacy	2	Series	1	Lynn Vision Gaming
3DMAX	0	Series	2	paiN Gaming
Aurora Gaming	1	Series	2	MOUZ

Round 5 matches (Advancement/Elimination)
Team	Score	Map	Score	Team
Legacy	1	Series	2	MOUZ
The MongolZ	2	Series	0	G2 Esports
Virtus.pro	1	Series	2	paiN Gaming

== Playoffs stage ==
The top eight teams from Stage 3 advanced to a single-elimination bracket. Teams were seeded according to their final Buchholz score earned in Stage 3. Each match in the Playoffs Stage is played in a best-of-three format.

The MongolZ became the first Asian team to reach the grand finals of a Major following a 2–0 victory over paiN Gaming in the semifinals.

The Playoffs Stage was played between June 19 and 22, 2025, at the Moody Center.

Quarterfinals
1	Spirit	25	9	10	1
8	MOUZ	21	13	13	2
5	Vitality	13	13	–	2
4	Natus Vincere	9	11	–	0
3	FaZe	9	11	–	0
6	The MongolZ	13	13	–	2
7	paiN	6	13	16	2
2	FURIA	13	6	12	1

Semifinals
MOUZ	8	13	6	1
Vitality	13	4	13	2
The MongolZ	13	13	–	2
paiN	5	5	–	0

Finals
Vitality	5	13	13	2
The MongolZ	13	4	6	1

=== Matchup results ===
Quarterfinals full results

Team Spirit vs. MOUZ
Team	Score	Map	Score	Team
Team Spirit	25	Mirage	21	MOUZ
Team Spirit	9	Dust II	13	MOUZ
Team Spirit	10	Nuke	13	MOUZ
MOUZ win 2–1

FURIA Esports vs. paiN Gaming
Team	Score	Map	Score	Team
FURIA Esports	13	Nuke	6	paiN Gaming
FURIA Esports	8	Anubis	13	paiN Gaming
FURIA Esports	12	Inferno	16	paiN Gaming
paiN Gaming win 2–1

Natus Vincere vs. Team Vitality
Team	Score	Map	Score	Team
Natus Vincere	9	Mirage	13	Team Vitality
Natus Vincere	11	Nuke	13	Team Vitality
Natus Vincere	—N/a			Team Vitality
Team Vitality win 2–0

FaZe Clan vs. The MongolZ
Team	Score	Map	Score	Team
FaZe Clan	9	Mirage	13	The MongolZ
FaZe Clan	11	Anubis	13	The MongolZ
FaZe Clan	—N/a			The MongolZ
The MongolZ win 2–0

Semifinals full results

MOUZ vs. Team Vitality
Team	Score	Map	Score	Team
MOUZ	8	Mirage	13	Team Vitality
MOUZ	13	Inferno	4	Team Vitality
MOUZ	9	Train	13	Team Vitality
Team Vitality win 2–1

paiN Gaming vs. The MongolZ
Team	Score	Map	Score	Team
paiN Gaming	5	Mirage	13	The MongolZ
paiN Gaming	5	Anubis	13	The MongolZ
paiN Gaming	—N/a			The MongolZ
The MongolZ win 2–0

Showmatch full results

Team USA vs. Stream Team
Team	Score	Map	Score	Team
Team USA	11	Nuke	13	Stream Team
Stream Team win 1-0				Stream Team

Grand finals full results

Team Vitality vs. The MongolZ
Team	Score	Map	Score	Team
Team Vitality	5	Mirage	13	The MongolZ
Team Vitality	13	Dust II	4	The MongolZ
Team Vitality	13	Inferno	6	The MongolZ
Team Vitality win 2–1

== Final standings ==
The final placings are shown below. In addition, the prize distribution, roster, and coaches are shown. An eliminated team's final position is decided by its win-loss record, then by its Buchholz score and finally by its initial seeding in the case of ties.

Place	Prize Money	Team	Roster	Coach
1st	US$500,000	Team Vitality	apEX, ZywOo, flameZ, mezii, ropz	XTQZZZ
2nd	US$170,000	The MongolZ	bLitz, Techno4K, 910, mzinho, Senzu	maaRaa
3rd	US$80,000	MOUZ	Brollan, Spinx, xertioN, Jimpphat, torzsi	sycrone
4th	US$80,000	paiN Gaming	dgt, biguzera, dav1deuS, nqz, snow	rikz
5th	US$45,000	Team Spirit	chopper, sh1ro, magixx, zont1x, donk	hally
6th	US$45,000	FURIA Esports	FalleN, yuurih, YEKINDAR, KSCERATO, molodoy	sidde
7th	US$45,000	FaZe Clan	karrigan, s1mple, rain, EliGE, frozen	NEO
8th	US$45,000	Natus Vincere	Aleksib, jL, iM, w0nderful, b1t	B1ad3
9th	US$15,000	Virtus.pro	FL4MUS, FL1T, fame, electroNic, ICY	F_1N
10th	US$15,000	Legacy	dumau, latto, n1ssim, lux, saadzin	chucky
11th	US$15,000	G2 Esports	huNter-, hades, malbsMd, Snax, HeavyGod	TaZ
12th	US$15,000	Aurora Gaming	XANTARES, woxic, MAJ3R, jottAAA, Wicadia	Fabre
13th	US$15,000	3DMAX	Lucky, Ex3rcice, Maka, Graviti, bodyy	wasiNk
14th	US$15,000	Lynn Vision Gaming	westmelon, z4kr, EmiliaQAQ, Starry, C4LLM3SU3	Gum
15th	US$15,000	Nemiga Gaming	1eeR, khaN, riskyb0b, Xant3r, zweih	boX
16th	US$15,000	Team Liquid	NAF, Twistzz, ultimate, NertZ, siuhy	DeMars DeRover
17th	US$10,000	B8	npl, esenthial, headtr1ck, alex666, kensizor	Maddened
18th	US$10,000	MIBR	exit, brnz4n, insani, saffee, Lucaozy	jnt
19th	US$10,000	HEROIC	SunPayus, LNZ, yxngstxr, xfl0ud, tN1R	sAw
20th	US$10,000	TYLOO	Attacker, JamYoung, Jee, Mercury, Moseyuh	zhokiNg
21st	US$10,000	M80	slaxz-, Swisher, reck, s1n, Lake	dephh
22nd	US$10,000	Team Falcons	NiKo, Magisk, TeSeS, m0NESY, kyxsan	zonic
23rd	US$10,000	BetBoom Team	s1ren, zorte, Magnojez, Ax1Le, Boombl4	RAiLWAY
24th	US$10,000	OG Esports	F1KU, Chr1zN, Buzz, spooke, nicoodoz	Lambert
25th	US$5,000	FlyQuest	INS, Liazz, Vexite, regali, nettik	erkaSt
26th	US$5,000	NRG Esports	oSee, HexT, nitr0, Jeorge, br0	daps
27th	US$5,000	Wildcard	stanislaw, JBa, Sonic, susp, phzy	vinS
28th	US$5,000	Imperial Esports	VINI, noway, decenty, try, chayJESUS	zakk
29th	US$5,000	Chinggis Warriors	controlez, ariucle, ROUX, efire, cool4st	carnage
30th	US$5,000	Complexity Gaming	JT, Grim, Cxzi, nicx, junior (Note: Paytyn "junior" Johnson substituted Håkon "hallzerk" Fjærli for Complexity following reported visa issues.)	adreN
31st	US$5,000	Metizport	adamb, Plopski, L00m1, isak, hampus	abdi
32nd	US$5,000	Fluxo	zevy, arT, kye, piriajr, mlhzin	bobz
