= List of Virtus.pro CS:GO tournament results =

The following is a list of achievements of esports organization Virtus.pro in Counter Strike: Global Offensive (CS:GO) and Counter Strike 2 (CS2).

== Achievements ==
Bold denotes a Counter-Strike Major Championship
Italics denote a Counter Strike Minor / RMR events

=== 2013 ===
- 3rd - Copenhagen Games 2013
- 1st - SLTV StarSeries V 2013

=== 2014 ===
- 2nd - Copenhagen Games 2014
- **1st - EMS One Katowice 2014**
- 5–8th - **ESL One Cologne 2014**
- 3rd–4th - **DreamHack Winter 2014**

=== 2015 ===
- 3rd–4th - **ESL One Katowice 2015**
- 3rd–4th - ESL ESEA Pro League Season 1 - Finals
- 3rd–4th - **ESL One Cologne 2015**
- 5–8th - **DreamHack Open Cluj-Napoca 2015**
- 3rd–4th - FACEIT 2015 Stage 3 Finals
- 1st - ESL ESEA Dubai Invitational 2015

=== 2016 ===
- 5–6th - Intel Extreme Masters X - World Championship
- 5–8th - **MLG Major Championship: Columbus**
- 1st - SL i-League Invitational: Kyiv
- 3rd–4th - **ESL One Cologne 2016**
- 1st - ELEAGUE Season 1
- 1st - Dreamhack Bucharest 2016
- 2nd - ESL One New York 2016
- 2nd - EPICENTER 2016

=== 2017 ===
- 2nd - **ELEAGUE Major 2017**
- 1st - DreamHack Masters Las Vegas 2017
- 1st - Adrenaline Cyber League
- 3rd–4th - **PGL Major Kraków 2017**
- 2nd - EPICENTER 2017
- 2nd - SL i-League Invitational Shanghai 2017

=== 2018 ===
- 15–16th - **ELEAGUE Major: Boston 2018**
- 12–14th - StarSeries i-League season 4
- 13–16th - IEM Katowice 2018
- 12–14th - StarSeries i-League season 5
- 2nd - V4 Future Sport Festival
- 3rd - IEM Shanghai 2018
- 23rd–24th - **FACEIT Major: London 2018**
- 5th - BLAST Pro Series Istanbul 2018

=== 2019 ===
- 7–8th - Charleroi Esports
- 2nd - ESL Polish Championship Spring 2019 Finals
- 3rd–4th - Moche XL Esports 2019
- 3rd–4th - Good Game League 2019
- 1st - Polish Esport League Spring 2019 Finals
- 7–8th - EPICENTER 2019

=== 2020 ===
- 5–6th - ICE Challenge 2020
- 13–16th - IEM Katowice 2020
- 13–15th - ESL Pro League Season 11: Europe
- 4th - ESL One: Road to Rio - CIS
- 1st - BLAST Premier CIS Cup
- 3rd - WePlay! Clutch Island
- 1st - IEM XV New-York Online: CIS
- 1st - Flashpoint Season 2
- 1st - DreamHack Open December 2020

=== 2021 ===
- 1st - cs_summit 7
- 2nd - Intel Extreme Masters XV - World Championship
- 7–8th - ESL Pro League Season 13
- 7–8th - DreamHack Masters Spring 2021
- 2nd - EPIC CIS League Spring 2021
- 5–6th - IEM XVI Summer
- 9–10th - StarLadder CIS RMR 2021
- 5–6th - IEM Cologne 2021
- 13–16th - ESL Pro League Season 14
- 1st - Pinnacle Fall Series #1
- 4th - IEM XVI Fall: CIS
- 5–8th - BLAST Premier: Fall Showdown 2021
- 5–8th - **PGL Major Stockholm 2021**

=== 2022 ===
- 1st - ESL Challenger #48
- 5–6th - IEM XVI - Katowice

==== as Outsiders ====
- 12–14th - **PGL Major Antwerp 2022**
- 2nd - ESL Challenger at DreamHack Valencia 2022
- 5–8th - ESL Pro League Season 16
- 1st - ESL Challenger at DreamHack Rotterdam 2022
- **1st - IEM Rio Major 2022**
- 7–8th - BLAST Premier World Final 2022

=== 2023 ===
==== as Outsiders ====
- 5–6th - IEM Katowice 2023
- 9–12th - ESL Pro League Season 17

==== as Virtus.pro ====
- 5–8th - BetBoom Playlist Urbanistic 2023
- 5–8th - BetBoom Playlist Freedom 2023
- 1st - ESL Challenger Katowice 2023
- 1st - CCT 2023 Online Finals 2
- 5–8th - Gamers8 2023
- 2nd - PARI Dunav Party 2023
- 13–16th - ESL Pro League Season 18
- 5–8th - CCT East Europe Series 3
- 1st - Roobet Cup 2023
- 2nd - Thunderpick World Championship 2023
- 3–4th - ESL Challenger Jönköping 2023
- 2nd - BetBoom Dacha 2023
- 1st - ESL Challenger Atlanta 2023

=== 2024 ===
- 1–4th - BLAST Premier Spring Groups 2024
- 9–12th - IEM Katowice 2024 Play-in
- **9–11th - PGL Major Copenhagen 2024**
- 5–6th - IEM Chengdu 2024
- 5–8th - ESL Pro League Season 19
- 5–6th - BetBoom Dacha Belgrade 2024
- 9–12th - IEM Dallas 2024
- 3–4th - BLAST Premier Spring Final 2024
- 3–4th - Esports World Cup 2024
- 13–16th - BLAST Premier Fall Groups 2024
- 13–16th - IEM Cologne 2024
- 3–4th - BLAST Premier Fall Showdown 2024
- 5–6th - BetBoom Dacha Belgrade Season 2
- 13–16th - ESL Pro League Season 20
- 5–6th - IEM Rio 2024
