= Donk (gamer) =

Russian esports player

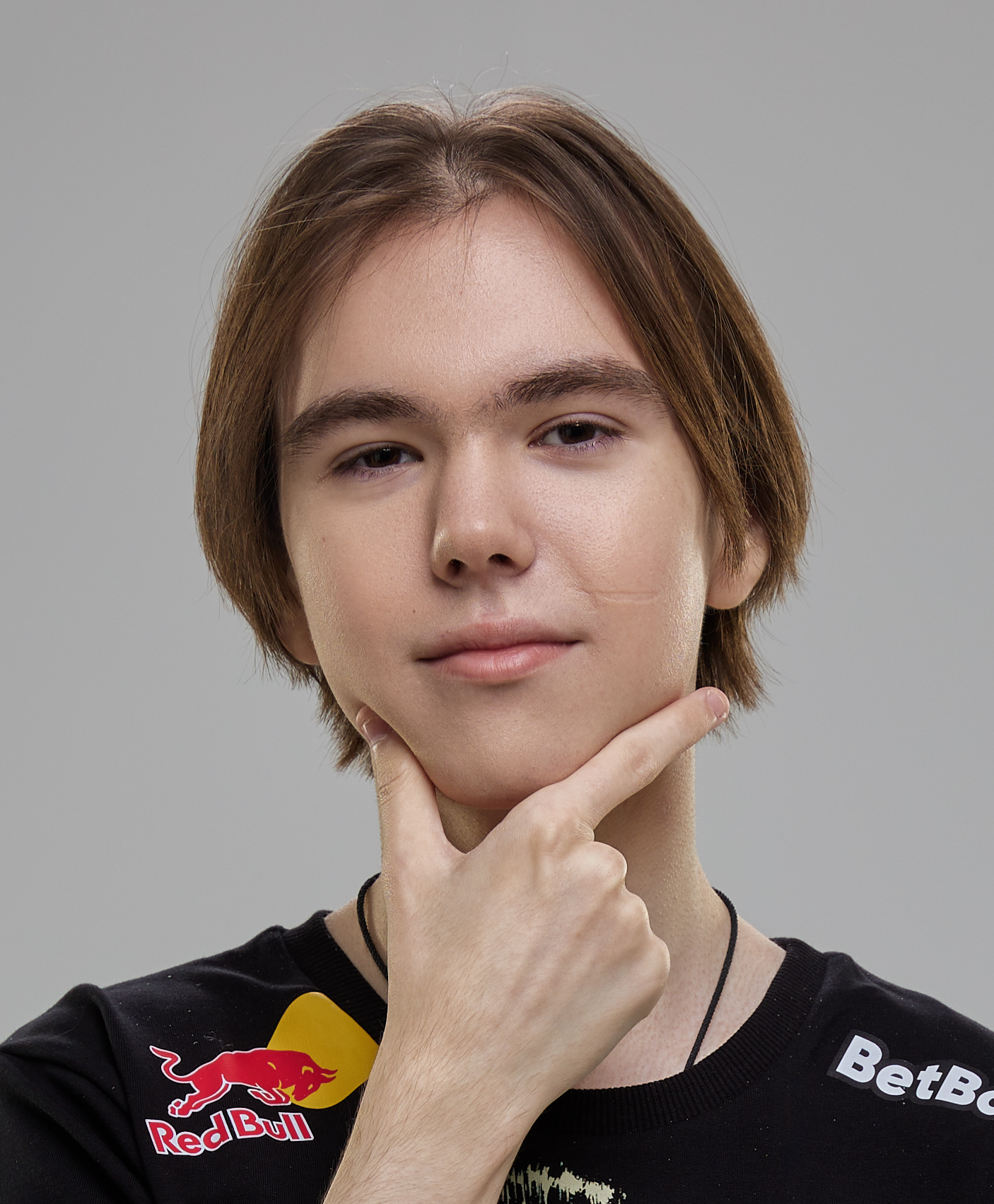
- Kryshkovets in 2025

Personal information
- Name: Данил Крышковец (Danil Kryshkovets)
- Born: January 25, 2007 (age 19); Tomsk, Russia
- Nationality: Russian

Current team
- Team: Team Spirit
- Role: Entry Fragger And Rifler
- Game: Counter-Strike 2

Career information
- Playing career: 2021–present

Team history
- 2021–2023: Spirit Academy (Note: Donk was inactive between January 2022 and May 2022.)
- 2023–present: Team Spirit

Career highlights and awards
- CS2 Major winner (Shanghai 2024); HLTV Major MVP (Shanghai 2024); 1× HLTV Player of the Year (2024); 2× HLTV Top 20 Player of the Year (2024, 2025); 13× HLTV MVP; 13x HLTV EVP; HLTV 2024 Rookie of the Year; HLTV 2024 Opener of the Year; HLTV 2024 Highlight of the Year; HLTV 2025 Opener of the Year; HLTV 2025 Highlight of the Year

Danil Kryshkovets, (Note: Russian: Данил Крышковец) better known by his nickname donk, is a Russian professional Counter-Strike 2 player for Team Spirit who is widely recognized for his aggressive playstyle. He was named the HLTV player of the year in 2024, becoming one of only three players, along with coldzera and ZywOo, to be named the HLTV Player of the Year in their first full year as a professional player. Danil is the youngest-ever HLTV Player of the Year, winning the award at 17 years and 352 days old.

== Early life ==
Born on January 25, 2007, in Tomsk, Danil started playing Counter-Strike at the age of four when his brother introduced him to the game. Two years later, they switched to a new version, Counter-Strike: Global Offensive. He devoted a lot of time to developing his skills, and at the age of 14 he was able to get into the European FPL-C.

== Career ==
=== Counter-Strike: Global Offensive ===
In 2021, when he was 14, he was scouted by Aleksey "OverDrive" Biryukov, who recommended him to the Team Spirit academy. He played for Team Spirit's youth roster for two years.

In 2023, Danil moved to the main Team Spirit roster. In the first tournament he played for them, CCT North Europe Series #6, they took first place. At their first LAN tournament, Dunav Party 2023, Spirit also took first place.

=== Counter-Strike 2 ===
==== 2024 ====
He received his first MVP title from HLTV for winning BetBoom Dacha Dubai 2023, ending his run with an HLTV rating of 1.31, making him the second youngest player in history to receive an HLTV MVP award. After Spirit won the IEM Katowice 2024 tournament, Danil was named the MVP and became the youngest player to be named an HLTV MVP at a Big Event. He also tied the Big Event rating record with a 1.70 rating, previously achieved by NiKo in 2017, doing so across more maps.

At his first Major, PGL Copenhagen 2024, Team Spirit advanced to the playoffs. In the first match of the playoffs, they lost the series to FaZe Clan. Despite this, Danil finished the tournament with a rating of 1.35.

After the Major, at BetBoom Dacha Belgrade 2024, Danil was awarded the MVP despite his team only taking second place. Spirit took first place in the final tournament of the season, the BLAST Premier Spring Final 2024, with Danil being the MVP of the championship. This tournament gave Spirit the first place in both Valve and HLTV team ratings.

In 2024, Team Spirit won the Perfect World Shanghai Major 2024, making Danil the youngest-ever Major champion, and he was awarded MVP, making him the youngest Major MVP. He became the highest-rated Major MVP with a 1.49 rating, surpassing the previous record of 1.47 by s1mple. In the tournament final against FaZe, Danil recorded a 1.67 rating over the three-map final, the highest rating achieved by a rifler in a Major final. He set the record for most aces at a Major, with four, surpassing the previous record of three by Egor "flamie" Vasilyev, and matched s1mple's record of four at a Big Event.

Following this performance, Danil was nominated for four individual awards at the HLTV Awards 2024: Rookie of the Year, Opener of the Year, Highlight of the Year, and Player of the Year. Danil won all four awards. Danil joined coldzera and ZywOo as the only players to be named the HLTV Player of the Year in their first full year as a professional player. Danil is also the youngest-ever to be named HLTV Player of the Year at 17 years and 352 days old.

==== 2025 ====
In 2025, Danil and Team Spirit claimed a win at the first Tier 1 event of the year, BLAST Bounty Season 1 Finals, earning Danil his 7th career HLTV MVP. Team Spirit struggled to compete against an increasingly dominant Team Vitality in the first half of the year, but were able to score a win at PGL Astana 2025, a Tier 1 tournament which Team Vitality did not attend. This earned Danil yet another HLTV MVP.

Danil completed his fifth consecutive season atop the FACEIT matchmaking leaderboard in July 2025, having placed first globally in each season since the release of Counter-Strike 2; in the fifth season, he finished at 5,283 Elo, over 400 Elo ahead of second place despite continuing to compete at the tier-one professional level.

After getting stopped in the playoffs of the BLAST.tv Austin Major 2025 by MOUZ, Team Spirit would bounce back to win IEM Cologne 2025, taking down rivals MOUZ 3-0 in the grand finals, earning Danil his ninth career HLTV MVP. Danil and Team Spirit followed up their IEM Cologne run with a back to back tournament win, this time defending their title as reigning BLAST Bounty champions against The MongolZ at BLAST Bounty Season 2 Finals. This performance earned Danil his tenth career HLTV MVP, tying GeT_RiGhT's record of most HLTV MVPs as a rifler. While Team Spirit finished third at StarLadder Budapest Major 2025, Danil recorded a 1.57 rating across nine maps, setting the record for the highest rating at a Major.

Although Danil posted the highest raw statistical output ever recorded in HLTV’s top 20 rankings, he finished second in 2025 behind ZywOo. HLTV cited ZywOo’s greater number of MVP awards, deeper tournament runs, and stronger playoff performances as the deciding factors. Danil won the HLTV awards for Opener of the Year and Highlight of the Year for 2025.

==== 2026 ====
After nine months of not winning a single Tier 1 event, Danil earned an HLTV MVP after defeating rivals Team Falcons in a 3-0 at the playoffs of PGL Astana 2026. With this award Danil became the most awarded rifler in history with 11 HLTV MVP awards, surpassing the previous joint-record of ten he shared with GeT_RiGhT and NiKo. He recorded a 1.61 rating, the second best at any CS2 Big Event by an MVP after his rating at IEM Katowice in 2024.

Later that year, Danil earned his 12th HLTV MVP at the 2026 Esports World Cup after defeating FUT Esports 3–1 in the playoffs, recording a 1.50 rating across the event and becoming the joint-fourth-most decorated player in Big Event MVPs with nine, alongside NiKo. Danil also became the youngest player to surpass $1 million in career prize money in the history of Counter-Strike, reaching the milestone at 19 years and six months and surpassing the previous record held by b1t, who reached it at 19 years and ten months. Danil won his 13th HLTV MVP at the BLAST Open Porto 2026, after defeating MOUZ 3–1 in the playoffs, it was also his 10th Big Event MVP, overtaking NiKo with nine. During the tournament, he also became the first player to record 20 aces at HLTV MVP-caliber events in Counter-Strike 2, surpassing ZywOo and NiKo, who had 18 each. In the opening match against DENDELE, he recorded two aces on Cache, one in which he dealt 500 damage without receiving any himself, the fourth recorded instance of such an ace at an HLTV-caliber event.

In August 2026, Danil finished atop the FACEIT matchmaking leaderboard for a sixth season, in which he set an all-time record-high Elo of 5,513 on the platform during Season 8.

== Awards and accolades ==
Rankings

- HLTV Top 20 Players: 1st (2024)
- HLTV Top 20 Players: 2nd (2025)

MVP

- BetBoom Dacha Dubai 2023
- IEM Katowice 2024
- BetBoom Dacha Belgrade 2024
- BLAST Premier Spring Final 2024
- BetBoom Dacha Belgrade Season 2
- Perfect World Shanghai Major 2024
- BLAST Bounty 2025 Season 1 Finals
- PGL Astana 2025
- IEM Cologne 2025
- BLAST Bounty 2025 Season 2 Finals
- PGL Astana 2026
- Esports World Cup 2026
- BLAST Open Porto 2026

Awards

- HLTV Rookie of the Year 2024
- HLTV Opener of the Year 2024
- HLTV Highlight of the Year 2024
- HLTV Player of the Year 2024
- HLTV Opener of the Year 2025
- HLTV Highlight of the Year 2025

== Tournament achievements ==
Placement	Tournament	Location	Date	Award
With Team Spirit
2nd place, silver medalist(s)	CCT Online Finals #2	Online	August 2 – 10, 2023	—
1st place, gold medalist(s)	BetBoom Dacha 2023	Dubai, UAE	December 5 – 10, 2023	MVP
1st place, gold medalist(s)	IEM Katowice 2024	Katowice, Poland	February 3 – 11, 2024	MVP
5—8	PGL CS2 Major Copenhagen 2024	Copenhagen, Denmark	March 17 – 31, 2024	EVP
2nd place, silver medalist(s)	BetBoom Dacha Belgrade 2024	Belgrade, Serbia	May 14 – 19, 2024	MVP
3rd place, bronze medalist(s)	IEM Dallas 2024	Dallas, TX, US	May 27 – June 2, 2024	—
1st place, gold medalist(s)	BLAST Premier Spring Final 2024	London, United Kingdom	June 12 – 16, 2024	MVP
5—8	Esports World Cup 2024	Riyadh, Saudi Arabia	July 3 – August 25, 2024	—
1st place, gold medalist(s)	BetBoom Dacha Belgrade Season 2	Belgrade, Serbia	August 28 – September 1, 2024	MVP
2nd place, silver medalist(s)	BLAST Premier World Final 2024	Sentosa, Singapore	October 30 – November 3, 2024	EVP
1st place, gold medalist(s)	Perfect World Shanghai Major 2024	Shanghai, China	December 5 – 15, 2024	MVP
1st place, gold medalist(s)	BLAST Bounty 2025 Season 1 Finals	Copenhagen, Denmark	January 23 – 26, 2025	MVP
2nd place, silver medalist(s)	IEM Katowice 2025	Katowice, Poland	February 1 – 9, 2025	EVP
3rd place, bronze medalist(s)	ESL Pro League Season 21	Stockholm, Sweden	March 1 – 16, 2025	—
3rd place, bronze medalist(s)	BLAST Open Spring 2025	Lisbon, Portugal	March 19 – 30, 2025	—
7—8	ESL Grand Slam Season 5	Online	April 17 – 27, 2025	—
3rd place, bronze medalist(s)	BLAST Rivals Spring 2025	Copenhagen, Denmark	April 30 – May 4, 2025	—
1st place, gold medalist(s)	PGL Astana 2025	Astana, Kazakhstan	May 10 – 18, 2025	MVP
5—8	BLAST Austin Major 2025	Austin, Texas	June 12 – 22, 2025	EVP
1st place, gold medalist(s)	IEM Cologne 2025	Cologne, Germany	July 26 – August 3, 2025	MVP
1st place, gold medalist(s)	BLAST Bounty 2025 Season 2 Finals	BLAST Studio, Malta	August 14 – 17, 2025	MVP
9—16	Esports World Cup 2025	Riyadh, Saudi Arabia	August 20 – 24, 2025	—
7—8	BLAST Open London 2025	Online	August 27 – September 1, 2025	—
5—8	ESL Pro League Season 22	Stockholm, Sweden	October 4 – 12, 2025	—
7—8	IEM Chengdu 2025	Chengdu, China	November 3 – 9, 2025	—
5—6	BLAST Rivals 2025 Season 2	Chek Lap Kok, Hong Kong	November 12 – 16, 2025	—
3—4	StarLadder Budapest Major 2025	Budapest, Hungary	December 4 – 14, 2025	EVP
5—8	BLAST Bounty 2026 Season 1 Finals	Malta	January 22 – 25, 2026	—
3rd place, bronze medalist(s)	IEM Kraków 2026	Kraków, Poland	January 31 – February 8, 2026	EVP
5—8	ESL Pro League Season 23 Finals	Stockholm, Sweden	March 13 – 15, 2026	—
7—8	BLAST Open Rotterdam 2026	Copenhagen, Denmark; Rotterdam, Netherlands (Note: BLAST Open Rotterdam 2026 was hosted in two separate locations. The group stage is located at Copenhagen, Denmark, and the playoffs is located at Rotterdam, Netherlands.)	March 18 – 29, 2026	—
2nd place, silver medalist(s)	IEM Rio 2026	Rio de Janeiro, Brazil	April 13 – 19, 2026	EVP
1st place, gold medalist(s)	PGL Astana 2026	Astana, Kazakhstan	May 9 – 17, 2026	MVP
3—4	IEM Cologne Major 2026	Cologne, Germany	June 2 – 21, 2026	EVP
2nd place, silver medalist(s)	BLAST Bounty 2026 Season 2	Malta	July 7 – August 2, 2026	—
1st place, gold medalist(s)	Esports World Cup 2026	Paris, France	August 12 – August 23, 2026	MVP
1st place, gold medalist(s)	BLAST Open Porto 2026	Copenhagen, Denmark Porto, Portugal (Note: BLAST Open Porto 2026 was hosted in two separate locations. The group stage is located at Copenhagen, Denmark, and the playoffs is located at Porto, Portugal.)	August 26 – September 6, 2026	MVP
