= NiKo =

Esports athlete

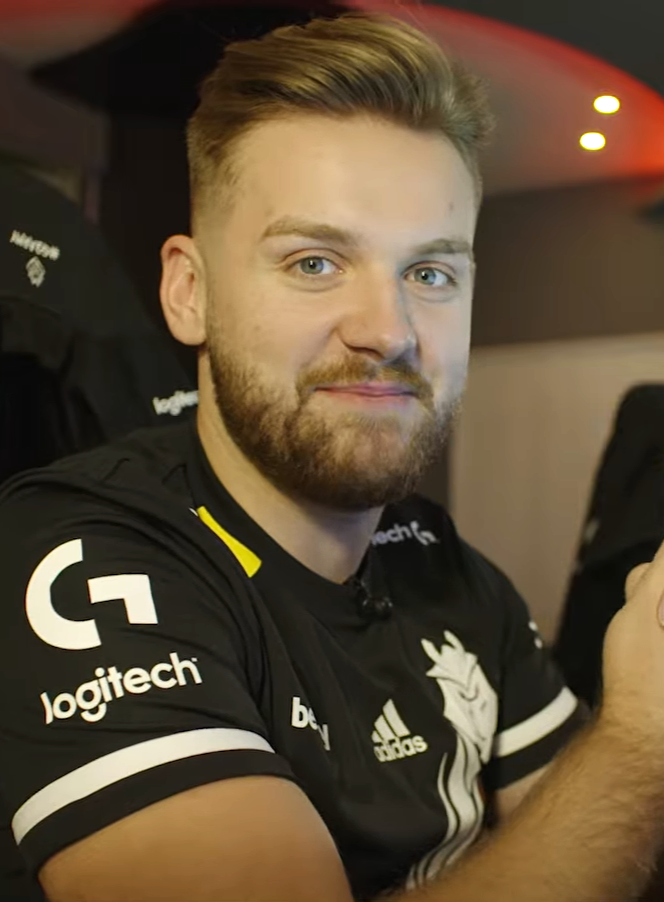
- NiKo in 2022

Personal information
- Name: Nikola Kovač
- Born: 16 February 1997 (age 29); Brčko, Bosnia and Herzegovina

Current team
- Team: Team Falcons
- Role: Rifler
- Game: Counter-Strike 2

Career information
- Playing career: 2015–present
- Role: Rifler, Secondary AWPer

Team history
- 2012–2013; 2015: iNation
- 2015–2017: mousesports
- 2017–2020: FaZe Clan
- 2020–2025: G2 Esports
- 2025–present: Team Falcons

Career highlights and awards
- 1× Major champion (Cologne 2026); 10x HLTV Top 20 Player of the Year (2016-2025); 10x HLTV MVP

Nikola Kovač, better known as NiKo, is a Bosnian professional Counter-Strike 2 player who plays for Team Falcons. NiKo is often cited by many professionals and analysts alike as one of the greatest Counter-Strike players of all time and the best rifler in the history of Counter-Strike: Global Offensive. He has been named a Top 20 Player Of The Year by HLTV ten times, the most top 20 player appearances in Counter-Strike history.

NiKo is widely considered one of the most mechanically skilled players in Counter-Strike and has been in contention for the title of the best player in the world at multiple periods throughout his career. He was ranked the No. 2 player in the world by HLTV in 2017 and 2023, the No. 3 player in 2018 and 2021, the No. 4 player in 2020 and 2024, and No. 5 in 2022.

== Early life ==
Nikola Kovač was born in Bijeljina, but lived in Brčko Bosnia and Herzegovina, to Serbian ethnic parents. His parents were owners of an internet café where Nikola would play the earlier Counter Strike games with his cousin Nemanja aka "huNter-".

== Career ==
=== 2011 ===
NiKo began his playing career on Counter-Strike 1.6. His first professional team was FullProof. Other teams he played for include eu4ia, neWave, maksnet, and DEFUSE.maksnet.

=== 2012–2014 ===
His first Counter-Strike: Global Offensive team was iNation. He shuffled through myDGB, e-Sports.rs, Team Refuse, GamePub and aimface while taking breaks from iNation.

=== 2015 ===
His performance with iNation brought him wider recognition in Europe, and he was signed by mousesports in March 2015. During his early period with the team, he was noted for strong individual performances. His team was sometimes dubbed "Nikosports" due to his individual performances, the most notable of them being his Desert Eagle ace on Cache.

=== 2016 ===
NiKo stayed on mousesports for the entirety of 2016. During this time they won Acer Predator Masters Season 2 and were ranked 3rd-4th in ELEAGUE Season 1, ESL One: New York 2016 European Qualifier, ESL Pro League Season 4 – Europe and ESL Pro League Season 4 – Finals.

=== 2017 ===
In February 2017, NiKo was acquired by FaZe Clan as they formed a star-player team. Kovač's first big tournament win was at StarLadder i-League StarSeries Season 3, followed by a winless period of five months with a near miss at Esports Championship Series Season 3. Following a reshuffle of the FaZe roster, bringing in two of the highest-rated players of 2015, Olof "olofmeister" Kajbjer Gustafsson and the star AWP player, Ladislav "GuardiaN" Kovács, FaZe was rejuvenated and managed back-to-back flawless victories at ESL One: New York 2017 and ELEAGUE CS:GO Premier 2017. At ESL One: New York 2017, NiKo dropped a 1.70 HLTV rating, a record that was only equaled by donk's legendary Katowice run in 2024. Following this, the team went two months without a win before taking the Esports Championship Series Season 4 trophy over Mousesports at the end of the year. He was ranked #2 in the year-end HLTV top 20 and had a rivalry with SK Gaming's coldzera throughout the year.

=== 2018 ===
Faze Clan fell just short at the finals in ELEAGUE Major: Boston 2018, choking a 15-11 lead in map 3 to the home region team Cloud9. The Major finals are widely acknowledged as the best professional matches of CS:GO ever played by the community. After choking another grand finals at IEM Katowice 2018 to Fnatic, FaZe entered another lull. However, the team managed to take home Intel Extreme Masters XIII – Sydney with Richard "Xizt" Landström standing in for olofmeister and the ESL One: Belo Horizonte 2018 event with Jørgen "cromen" Robertsen as a stand-in.

In October 2018, FaZe came in first place in the EPICENTER 2018 event in Moscow, Russia, making this his seventh first-place victory at a premier event with FaZe Clan. NiKo was ranked No. 3 at the HLTV top 20, having been in contention for the title of best player of the year at the beginning but exiting the race after his form cooled in the 2nd half.

=== 2019 ===
FaZe went through a number of in-game leaders (IGLs) during this time after the removal of karrigan last year, before settling on NiKo. By the end of 2019 FaZe's trophy count had gone up to ten as they won BLAST Pro Series Copenhagen but didn't finish in the top 4 at either major. Statistically, this was the worst year of NiKo's career thus far, as he had to settle for 11th place on the HLTV top 20 list as a result of his IGL duties, and he finished outside of the top 10 for the first time since 2016 in the HLTV top 20.

=== 2020 ===
2020 marked another victory for FaZe and now IGL Kovač, as they won the European division of IEM New York 2020 Online over OG. On October 28, 2020, after a three-and-a-half-year venture with FaZe Clan, Kovač was acquired by G2 Esports and was united with his cousin huNter.

No longer an IGL, NiKo was back in his old form again this year and was ranked No. 4 in HLTV's top 20.

=== 2021 ===
NiKo led G2 to the grand finals of the PGL Major Stockholm 2021 but lost to a dominant Na'Vi team. The grand finals also featured the infamous NiKo whiff on s1mple at Nuke in map 2, which ultimately Na'Vi won to lift the major trophy.

They had also been runner-up to the same Na'Vi team at the Intel Extreme Masters XVI – Cologne earlier in the year. He went through a career-best run in the second half of 2021 with CS:GO's return to LAN, posting a consecutive 34-map 1+ rating streak, the highest of his career and of any top 20 players that year. He finished third in the HLTV top 20, behind ZywOo and S1mple.

=== 2022 ===
G2 signed a young prodigy Russian awper, m0NESY leading G2 and Niko to a 2nd place at IEM Katowice. NiKo's G2 fell 3-0 to FaZe Clan in the grand final, with FaZe forced to field jks as a substitute. The match featured the legendary Mirage map, extending to 58 rounds before FaZe clinched victory with a 31-27 scoreline.

Soon the team's form dropped as Blast Premier Spring Finals and ESL Pro League Season 16 were their only top 4 finish till December 2022. G2 did not qualify for the IEM Rio Major, with Niko commenting that these times are his toughest months of his career but reassured that he will never give up. NiKo and G2 bounced back and won the Blast Premier World Final 2022. He finished 5th in the HLTV Top 20.

=== 2023 ===
On 12 February 2023, G2 won IEM Katowice 2023 undefeated, only suffering a loss on a single map to the hands of Heroic in the grand finals. This was NiKo's first win at IEM Katowice and having lost the previous three finals there in 2017, 2018, and 2022. NiKo and G2 qualified for the 2023 Blast.tv Paris Major 2023 through the RMR into the Challengers stage, where they would qualify fthe or Legends stage following a 3-0 run in the Challengers Stage. NiKo and G2 would go on to be eliminated in the Legends stage by Fnatic in a 1-2 elimination game, thus ensuring NiKo would never win a CSGO major.

G2 became the champions of IEM Cologne 2023, where NiKo earned his eighth MVP award.

NiKo's exceptional numbers against the best teams at the biggest events allowed him to achieve second place on HLTV's Top 20 Players of the Year list, behind ZywOo.

=== 2024 ===
2024 began rough for NiKo, who suffered a dip in form compared to his CS:GO performance, averaging a 1.15 rating in the first half of the season in contrast to his usual 1.2+ performances. However, NiKo exhibited more sublime form in the latter half of the season, which earned him the 4th place on HLTV's Top 20 Players of the Year list after another year of overall strong individual play. NiKo also set a new record for most consecutive appearances in the top 20 with 9 consecutive appearances.

NiKo finished in the top 4 of the PGL Copenhagen major. He, however won IEM Dallas 2024 with a stand-in Stewie2K. NiKo struggled against Na'Vi throughout the season, enduring nine consecutive losses before finally securing a victory at the BLAST Premier Fall Final. G2 rebuilt the roster adding malbsMd and veteran Polish player, Snax, in place of the players, Hooxi and Nexa.

The revamped lineup went on to claim the BLAST Premier Fall Final 2024, defeating Team Vitality in the semifinals and Na'Vi in the grand finale. During the semifinal clash against Vitality, NiKo made headlines by smashing a hole in the table after failing to convert a 1v5 clutch attempt. However, his struggles continued in the following tournament IEM Rio, where he posted a career-worst 0.51 HLTV rating and exited in 13th–16th place. Despite this setback, G2 rebounded strongly, winning the BLAST Premier World Final with a triumph over Team Spirit in the grand finale. NiKo’s run with G2 ultimately ended in the semifinals of the Perfect World Shanghai Major, where he fell to FaZe Clan.

=== 2025 ===
On 3 January 2025, NiKo departed G2 and joined the Saudi organization Team Falcons, becoming a key part of their efforts to rebuild and assemble a star-studded roster. On February 23 2025, NiKo won his 9th HLTV MVP at PGL Cluj-Napoca 2025 despite losing the finals to MOUZ.

On 13 April 2025, NiKo and the Falcons won their first trophy together in PGL Bucharest 2025, beating G2 Esports in the Final. Soon, NiKo reunited with G2's star AWPer, m0NESY, in Team Falcons. With m0NESY and NiKo, Falcons immediately showed strong results, finishing second at IEM Melbourne after choking a 12-6 lead in map five (Nuke) to Team Vitality. They then competed at BLAST Rivals, where they once again fell to Team Vitality in a 3-2 series in the finals. The Falcons were eliminated from Blast TV Austin Major in 20-22nd place after suffering upset losses to B8, Lynn Vision and MIBR.

NiKo and Team Falcons finished in 5-8th place in the second major of the year, the StarLadder Budapest Major. The team made it to the playoffs with an opening BO1 loss to B8, wins against Imperial and Passion UA, a BO3 loss to MOUZ and a win against G2 for a 3-2 record, and then got promptly knocked out of the tournament following a loss to Team Spirit in the playoff quarterfinals.

At the end of the year, NiKo was voted for the 18th best player of the year, breaking the record for most amounts of HLTV top 20 appearances since the introduction of the award, this was also NiKo´s worst performing year in HLTV top 20.

=== 2026 ===
In April 2026, NiKo reunited with karrigan as karrigan joined Falcons as IGL.

On 21 June 2026, 3067 days since ELEAGUE Major: Boston 2018, NiKo won the Major title at the IEM Cologne Major 2026 with Team Falcons, defeating FURIA in a 3-0 sweep.

== Awards and recognition ==
- Was voted the 11th best player of 2016 by HLTV.
- Was voted the 2nd best player of 2017 by HLTV.
- Was voted the 3rd best player of 2018 by HLTV.
- Was voted the 11th best player of 2019 by HLTV.
- Was voted the 4th best player of 2020 by HLTV.
- Was voted the 3rd best player of 2021 by HLTV.
- Was voted the 5th best player of 2022 by HLTV.
- Was voted the 2nd best player of 2023 by HLTV.
- Was voted the 4th best player of 2024 by HLTV.
- Was voted the 18th best player of 2025 by HLTV.
- Was voted the MVP of 10 different tournaments.

== Tournament Results ==
Placement	Tournament	Location	Date
With FaZe Clan
2nd	IEM Katowice 2017	Katowice, Poland	March 1, 2017 – March 6, 2017
1st	SL i-league StarSeries Season 3 Finals	Kyiv, Ukraine	April 4, 2017 – April 9, 2017
2nd	IEM Sydney 2017	Sydney, Australia	May 3, 2017 – May 7, 2017
2nd	ECS Season 3 Finals	London, United Kingdom	June 23, 2017 – June 25, 2017
1st	ELEAGUE CS:GO Premier 2017	Atlanta, United States	September 8, 2017 – October 13, 2017
1st	ESL One: New York 2017	New York, United States	September 15, 2017 – September 17, 2017
2nd	IEM Oakland 2017	Burbank and Oakland, United States	November 14, 2017 – November 19, 2017
2nd	ESL Pro League Season 6 Finals	Odense, Denmark	December 5, 2017 – December 10, 2017
1st	ECS Season 4 Finals	Cancun, Mexico	December 15, 2017 – December 17, 2017
2nd	ELEAGUE Major: Boston 2018	Boston, United States	January 12, 2018 – January 28, 2018
2nd	IEM Katowice 2018	Katowice, Poland	February 27, 2018 – March 4, 2018
1st	IEM Sydney 2018	Sydney, Australia	May 1, 2018 – May 6, 2018
1st	ESL One Belo Horizonte 2018	Belo Horizonte, Brazil	June 13, 2018 – June 17, 2018
1st	EPICENTER 2018	Moscow, Russia	October 23, 2018 – October 28, 2018
1st	ELEAGUE CS:GO Invitational 2019	Atlanta, United States	January 25, 2019 – January 27, 2019
With G2 Esports
2nd	IEM Cologne 2021	Cologne, Germany	July 6, 2021 – July 18, 2021
2nd	PGL Major Stockholm 2021	Stockholm, Sweden	October 26, 2021 – November 7, 2021
2nd	IEM Katowice 2022	Katowice, Poland	February 17, 2022 – February 27, 2022
1st	Blast Premier World Final 2022	Abu Dhabi, UAE	December 14, 2022 – December 18, 2022
1st	IEM Katowice 2023	Katowice, Poland	February 4, 2023 – February 12, 2023
1st	IEM Cologne 2023	Cologne, Germany	July 29, 2023 – August 6, 2023
1st	IEM Dallas 2024	Dallas, United States	May 27, 2024 – June 2, 2024
2nd	Esports World Cup 2024	Riyadh, Saudi Arabia	July 17, 2024 – July 21, 2024
1st	Blast Premier Fall Final 2024	Copenhagen, Denmark	September 25, 2024 – September 29, 2024
1st	Blast Premier World Final 2024	Singapore	October 30, 2024 – November 3, 2024
With Team Falcons
2nd	PGL Cluj-Napoca 2025	Cluj Napoca, Romania	February 14, 2025 – February 23, 2025
1st	PGL Bucharest 2025	Bucharest, Romania	April 6, 2025 – April 13, 2025
2nd	IEM Melbourne 2025	Melbourne, Australia	April 21, 2025 – April 27, 2025
2nd	BLAST Rivals 2025 Season 1	Copenhagen, Denmark	April 30, 2025 – May 4, 2025
1st	IEM Cologne Major 2026	Cologne, Germany	June 02, 2026 – June 21, 2026
