= Blast Pro Series =

Former Counter-Strike esports tournament

- Official logo
- Founded: November 25, 2017
- Folded: December 2019
- Replaced by: BLAST Premier
- Owner: BLAST ApS
- No. of teams: 6
- Countries: Various
- Headquarters: Copenhagen, Denmark
- Last champion: FaZe Clan (2nd title)
- Most titles: Astralis (4 titles)
- Broadcasters: Twitch; Twitter; YouTube
- Website: blastproseries.com

BLAST Pro Series was an international Counter-Strike: Global Offensive tournament. The tournament brought together six teams in a shortened two-day tournament format. The event rotated locations in cities around the world. The Danish esports organisation, RFRSH Entertainment, created the tournament in 2017.

The tournament series was discontinued in favor of the league-style BLAST Premier, which began in early 2020.

== Editions ==
On December 1, 2019, the first BLAST Pro Series Global Finals took place in Bahrain, as the best four teams on their events along the year qualify for the US$500,000 prize pool event.

Table key

Global Final

Edition	Date	Venue	Champions	Runner-ups	Prize pool	Most valuable player	Ref
2017
1	November 25, 2017	Royal Arena, Copenhagen	SK Gaming	Astralis	US$250,000	Gabriel "FalleN" Toledo	
2018
2	September 28–29, 2018	Ülker Sports Arena, Istanbul	Astralis (1)	MIBR	US$250,000	Nicolai "device" Reedtz	
3	November 2–3, 2018	Royal Arena, Copenhagen	Natus Vincere	Ninjas in Pyjamas	US$250,000	Aleksandr "s1mple" Kostyliev	
4	December 14–15, 2018	Altice Arena, Lisbon	Astralis (2)	Natus Vincere	US$250,000	Emil "Magisk" Reif	
2019 season
5	March 22–23, 2019	Ginásio do Ibirapuera, São Paulo	Astralis (3)	Team Liquid	US$250,000	Nicolai "device" Reedtz	
6	April 12–13, 2019	Watsco Center, Miami	FaZe Clan	Team Liquid	US$250,000	Nikola "NiKo" Kovač	
7	May 10–11, 2019	Madrid Arena, Madrid	ENCE	Astralis	US$250,000	Jani "Aerial" Jussila	
8	July 12–13, 2019	HD Buttercup Building, Los Angeles	Team Liquid	FaZe Clan	US$250,000	Keith "NAF" Markovic	
9	September 13–14, 2019	VTB Arena, Moscow	AVANGAR	ForZe	US$250,000	Dzhami "Jame" Ali	
10	November 1–2, 2019	Royal Arena, Copenhagen	FaZe Clan (2)	Ninjas in Pyjamas	US$250,000	Nikola "NiKo" Kovač	
11	December 13–14, 2019	ISA Sports City, Riffa	Astralis (4)	Team Liquid	US$500,000	Peter "dupreeh" Rasmussen	
