= Royal Arena =

Multi-use indoor arena in Copenhagen

- Copenhagen Arena

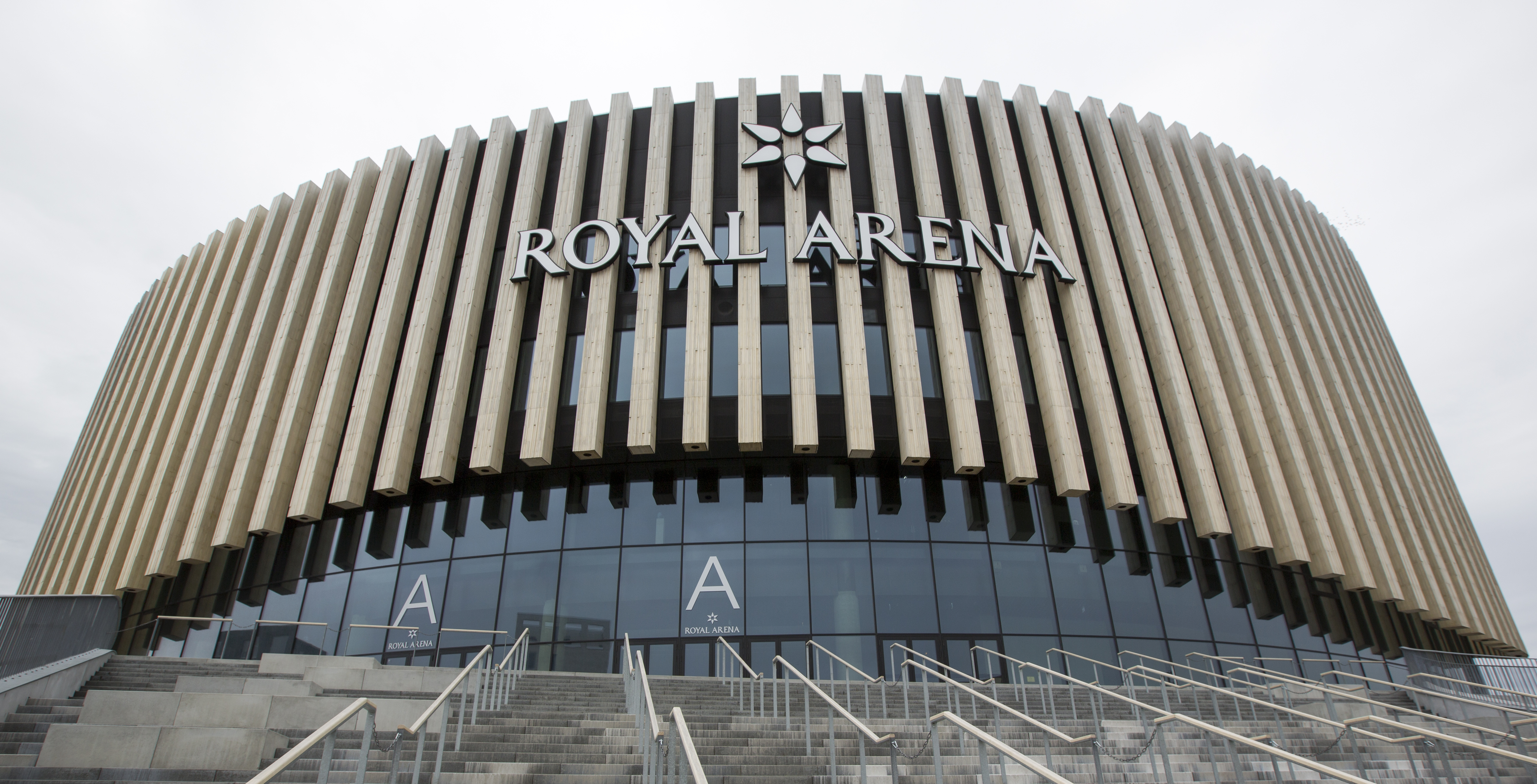
- Interactive map of Royal Arena
- Location: Ørestad South, Copenhagen
- Coordinates: 55.624°N 12.574°E
- Owner: Arena CPHX P/S
- Operator: Danish Venue Enterprise
- Capacity: 12,500 (ice hockey); 13,000 (handball); 17,000 (concerts)

Construction
- Groundbreaking: 26 June 2013
- Built: 2013–2016
- Opened: 3 February 2017
- Cost: DKK 1 billion EUR € 134 million
- Architects: 3XN (primary); HKS, Inc. (arena experts); Planit IE (landscape)
- Structural engineers: Arup and ME Engineers

Website
- www.royalarena.dk

The Royal Arena is a multi-use indoor arena in the Ørestad South area of Copenhagen, Denmark. The ground was broken for construction on 26 June 2013 and the arena opened in February 2017. It has a capacity of 12,500 for sporting events and up to 17,000 (either sitting or standing) for concerts.

== Background ==
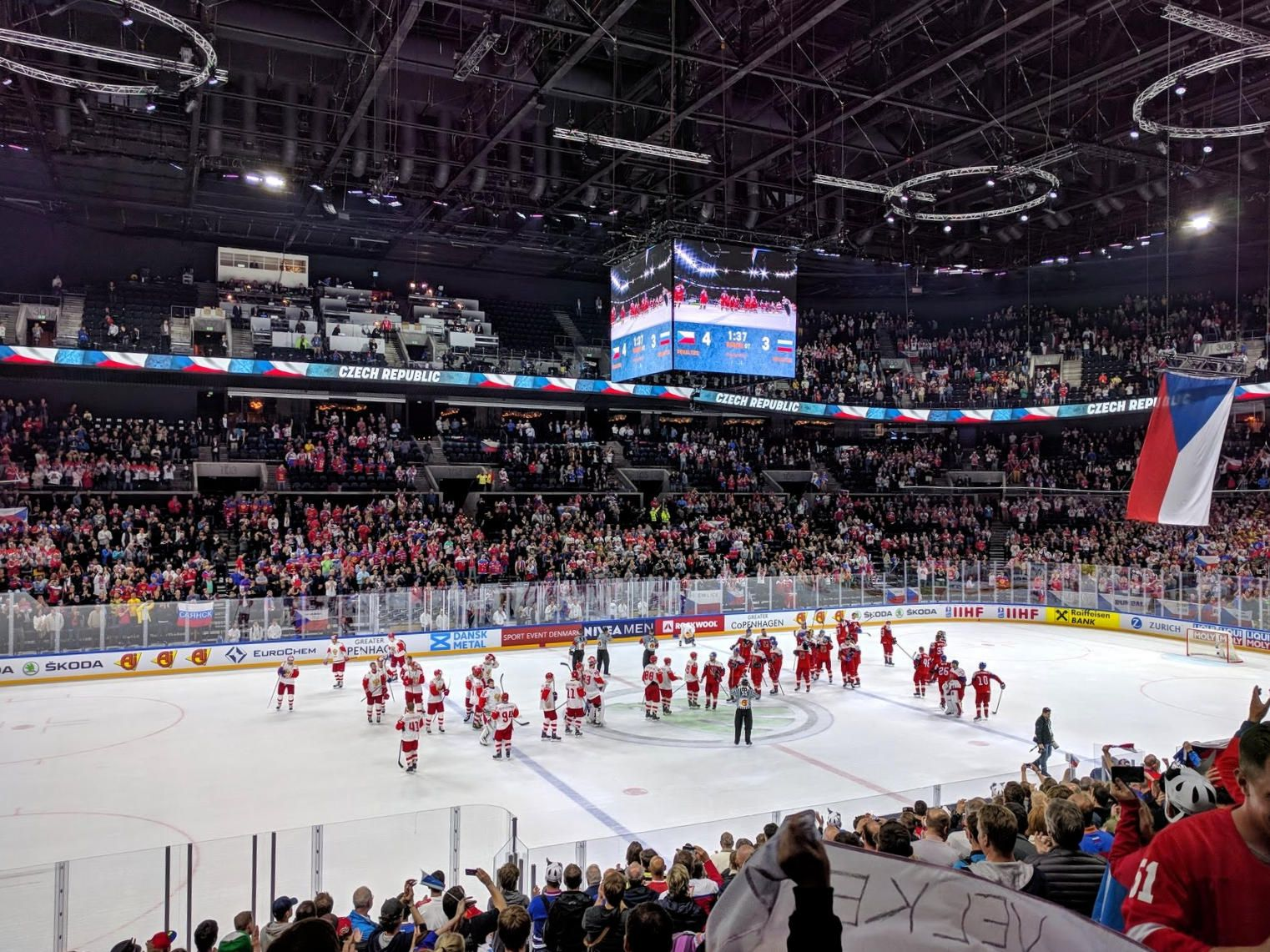
IIHF World Championship 2018. Royal Arena

In Copenhagen, Parken Stadium, which is primarily a football stadium, is the largest indoor arena in Denmark (when its retractable roof is closed), with a seating capacity of 38,065. For most international sporting events, Brøndby Hall and Ballerup Super Arena were not considered large enough, while Parken Stadium is too large.

While the Malmö Arena in Sweden, across from Copenhagen on the eastern side of the Øresund strait (which forms the Denmark–Sweden border), was suitable for regional and international events requiring an indoor arena with a capacity of 10,000–20,000, it could not be expected to serve Danish domestic events. Copenhagen also wished to host its own international events, such as the Eurovision Song Contest, WWE, World Men's Handball Championship, Ice Hockey World Championship, FINA World Aquatics Championships, and major concerts. Thus, the decision was made to build an arena of this size in Copenhagen.

== Construction ==
The overall Ørestad area was first chosen by the city council for redevelopment in 1993. The arena project, seen as an important addition to the development plan, was presented at a press conference at Bella Sky Hotel on 23 September 2011. The design of the arena was presented on 7 June 2012. The winning design team consisted of 3XN, HKS, Inc., Arup, ME Engineers and Planit. This team provided a distinctly Nordic design for the arena.

=== Financing and operation ===
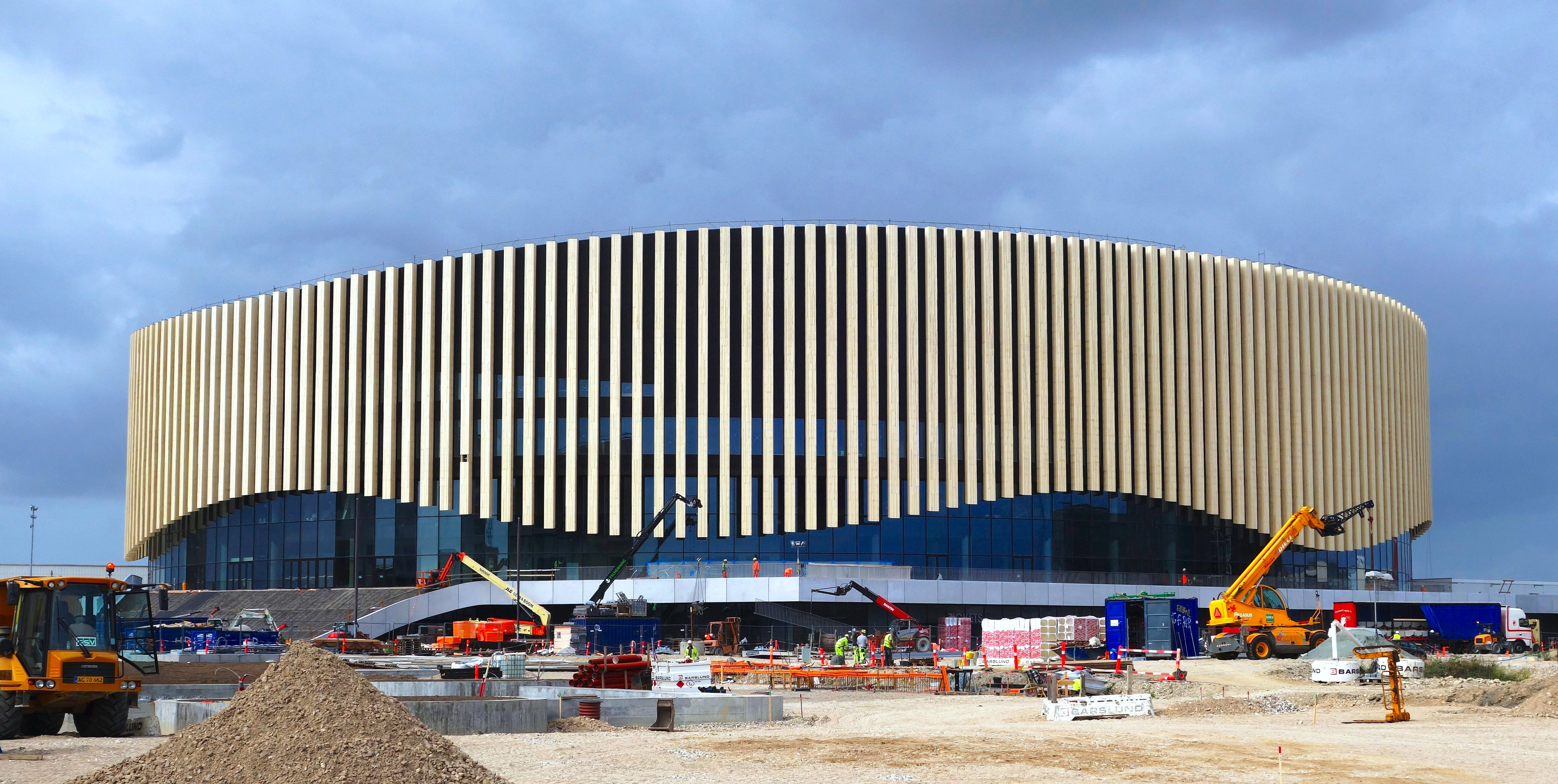
The arena under construction in September 2016

Realdania and Copenhagen Municipality each made DKK 325,000,000 available for the project, while the Elite Facility Committee provided a construction grant, and operating grants were provided by the National Olympic Committee and Sports Confederation of Denmark. The site was made available by CPH City & Port Development. The chosen operator had to arrange the rest of the financing.

Although five companies qualified to bid as arena operators, Live Nation was selected as operator ahead of AEG Facilities in December 2011.

In 2014, Danish brewery Royal Unibrew was announced as the commercial sponsor, earning the naming rights ("Royal") on the arena.

In December 2025, it was announced Royal Arena was to be acquired by the Beverley Hills-headquartered multinational entertainment company, Live Nation Entertainment of an undisclosed amount.

== Notable events ==
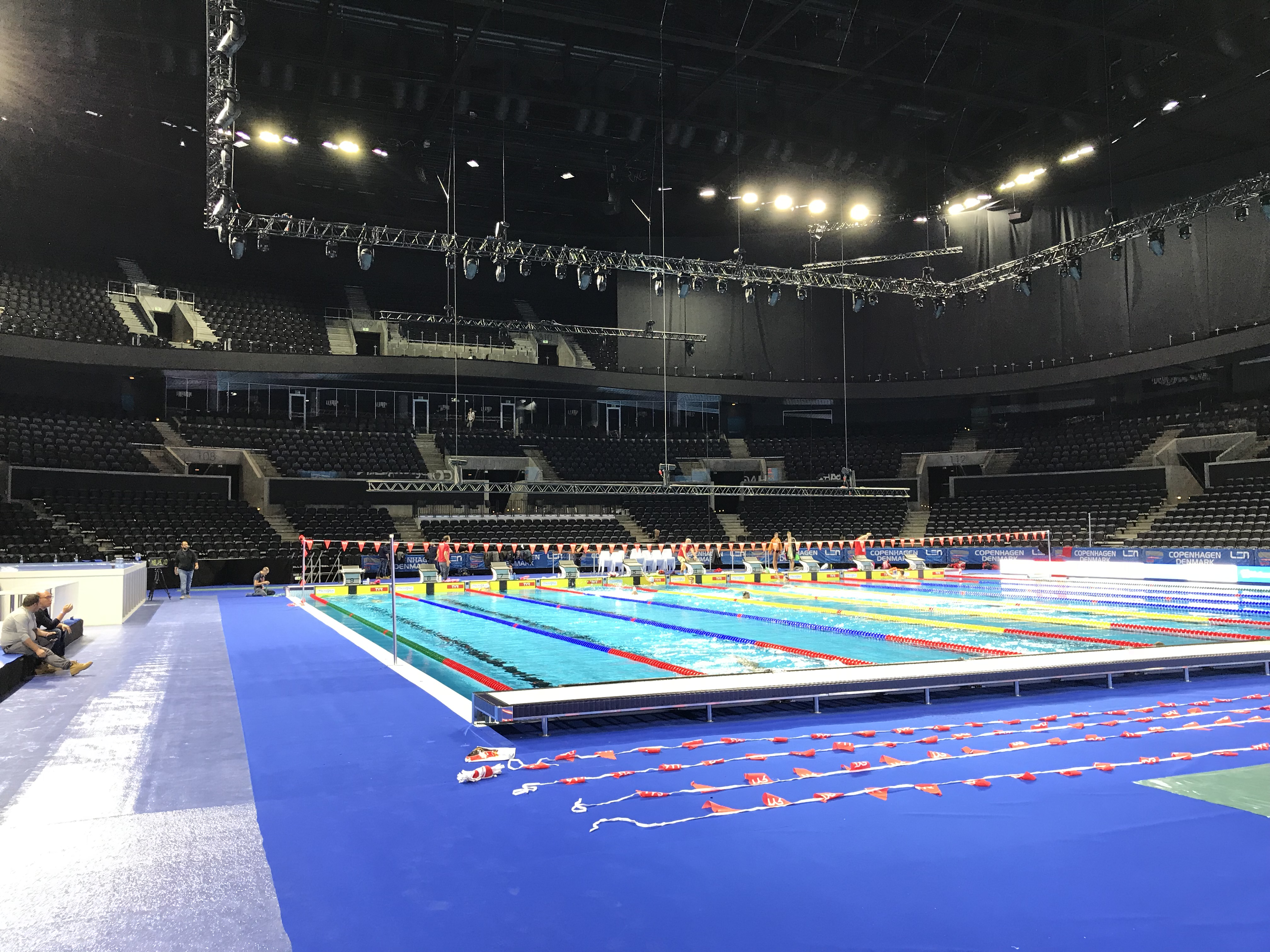
2017 European Short Course Championships

On 26 September 2016, Metallica announced via their blog that they will be "the first event ever held" at the new arena. Their shows are scheduled for the first week of February 2017. The Weeknd performed at the arena as part of his Starboy: Legend of the Fall Tour on 20 February 2017.

The 2017 European Short Course Swimming Championships was the first major sporting event in the arena, with a capacity of circa 12,500. The arena was one of two arenas (the other being Jyske Bank Boxen) to host the 2018 IIHF World Championship. The Royal Arena was one of eight venues in Denmark and Germany to host the 2019 World Men's Handball Championship. It was also used for the 2018 Spring European League of Legends Championship Series third-place decider and finals on 7 April 2018, and 8 April 2018, respectively.

On 28 September 2019, the arena hosted Denmark's first UFC event, UFC Fight Night: Hermansson vs. Cannonier.

Since 2017, the arena has regularly hosted Counter-Strike: Global Offensive tournaments organized by BLAST Pro Series (now BLAST Premier as of 2020). The Royal Arena hosted the first Counter-Strike 2 Major tournament in March 2024 with PGL Major Copenhagen 2024 and Dota 2 premier annual tournament The International in September 2024.

== See also ==
- List of indoor arenas in Denmark
- List of indoor arenas in Nordic countries
