= FalleN =

Brazilian professional Counter-Strike player

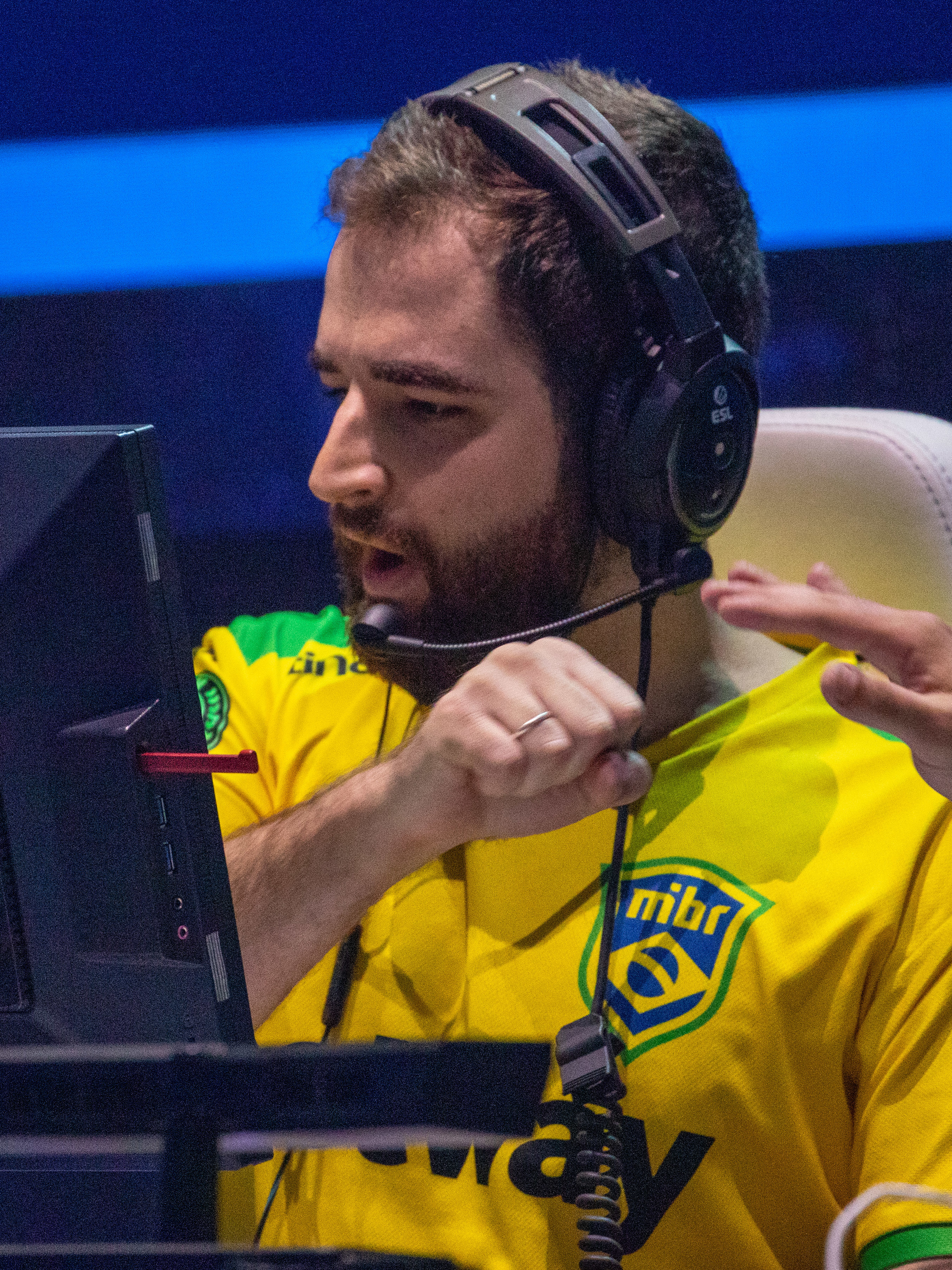
- Toledo at IEM Chicago 2019

Personal information
- Name: Gabriel Toledo de Alcântara Sguario
- Born: May 30, 1991 (age 35); Itararé, São Paulo, Brazil

Current team
- Team: Furia Esports
- Role: Rifler (In-Game Leader), formerly AWPer
- Game: Counter-Strike 2

Career information
- Games: Counter-Strike 1.6; Counter-Strike: Source; Crossfire; Counter-Strike: Global Offensive; Counter-Strike 2

Team history
- 2005–2009: Team Crashers
- 2009–2010: FireGamers
- 2010–2011: compLexity Gaming
- 2011–2012: Mandic
- 2012: SemXorah
- 2013: PlayArt
- 2013–2014: ProGaming.TD
- 2014: KaBuM! e-Sports
- 2014: Games Academy
- 2014–2015: KaBuM.TD
- 2015: Keyd Stars
- 2015–2016: Luminosity Gaming
- 2016–2018: SK Gaming
- 2018–2020: MiBR
- 2021–2022: Team Liquid
- 2022–2023: Imperial Esports
- 2023–present: Furia Esports

Career highlights and awards
- 2× Counter-Strike Major champion (Columbus 2016, Cologne 2016)

Gabriel Toledo de Alcântara Sguario (born May 30, 1991), better known as FalleN, is a Brazilian professional Counter-Strike 2 player for Furia Esports and former Counter-Strike: Global Offensive, Counter-Strike: Source and Counter-Strike 1.6 player. FalleN is a two-time Counter-Strike Major champion, winning MLG Columbus 2016 with Luminosity Gaming and ESL One Cologne 2016 with SK Gaming.

In 2015, FalleN was chosen as the most influential person in Brazilian esports. He was also nominated PC personality of the year by the eSports Industry Awards in 2016. He is the owner of Brazilian esports organization Games Academy.

== Esports career ==
FalleN began playing Counter-Strike in 2003 with the rise of gaming rooms in Brazil.

In 2026, FalleN announced his retirement from professional play at IEM Rio.

Outside of esports, FalleN started his own brand of gaming computers and equipment marketed as cheap and accessible products for Brazil.

== Individual awards ==
- Nominated the most influential person of Brazilian eSports (2015)
- Nominated PC personality of the year (2016) - E-Sports Industry Awards
- Nominated 2nd best player of the year (2016) and 6th best player of the year (2017) - HLTV.org
- Nominated the "AWPer of the year" (2016) - GosuGamers.net
- Nominated the "In-game leader of the year" (2016) - GosuGamers.net
- "30 under 30 in games" (2017) - Forbes
- Most Valuable Player (MVP) of ESL One: Cologne 2017
