= Imperial Esports =

Brazilian esports organization

Gamdom Imperial
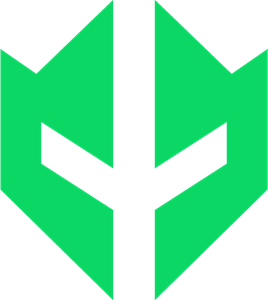
- Short name: IMP
- Divisions: Counter-Strike 2 Teamfight Tactics
- Founded: 9 March 2018; 8 years ago
- Location: Brazil
- Colors
- CEO: Felippe Martins
- Main sponsor: Gamdom
- Website: imperialesports.com.br

Gamdom Imperial (formerly known as Imperial Esports), or simply Imperial, is a Brazilian professional esports organization currently sponsored by the online casino Gamdom. It is best known for its Counter-Strike team, which was formerly made up of veteran players from the Brazilian scene, such as FalleN, fer, fnx, boltz and VINI. While the team has changed over time, the 2022 Imperial team, nicknamed "The Last Dance" (in reference to The Last Dance series) gained popularity in the run-up to the Rio 2022 Major. The organization also sponsors the Brazilian Teamfight Tactics player Lucas "Bio1uc" Sales, as well as formerly having Crossfire, Mobile Legends: Bang Bang and Valorant teams.

== Counter-Strike ==
=== History ===
On September 5, 2018, Imperial acquired the Counter-Strike team from Santos e-Sports. In early 2022, after the contract of all its players expired, the organization signed "The Last Dance", a team created by Gabriel "FalleN" Toledo that aimed to bring together veterans of the Brazilian competitive scene. Rumors indicated that the initial idea was to bring together the five former members of the team that won two Majors, one for Luminosity Gaming and another for SK Gaming, composed of FalleN, Fernando "fer" Alvarenga, Lincoln "fnx" Lau, Marcelo "coldzera" David and Epitacio "TACO" de Melo, however, the last two players already had other projects and chose not to participate. Brazilians Ricardo "boltz" Prass and Vinicius "VINI" Figueiredo were chosen to complete the team, in addition to Luis "peacemaker" Tadeu as coach.

The team managed, through the American RMR, to qualify to compete in the PGL Major Antwerp 2022 at the Challengers Stage and then move on to the Legends Stage, where they were eliminated without reaching the playoffs.

On August 12, Imperial announced peacemaker's departure from the team due to "some internal issues within the group". On August 21, it was announced that fnx would stop playing for the team and would assume the role of coach; he was replaced by Marcelo "chelo" Cespedes.

On October 9, Imperial secured the remaining 24-team berth of the IEM Rio Major 2022 in a 2–1 closely fought series against North American Complexity Gaming, with the final map being 22–20. The team did not get good results in the tournament and fell in the first phase.

On April 2, 2023, Imperial won the BLAST Premier Spring American Showdown and became the representative from the Americas to play in the BLAST Premier Spring Finals. In the Spring Finals, Imperial debuted by winning a 2–0 series against Team Vitality, who had just won the BLAST Paris Major 2023 without dropping a single map. They reached the semifinals of the tournament, where they fell to Heroic 2–1, earning their first major placement in a top-level championship.

Imperial announced the departures of FalleN and chelo on July 3, 2023.

JOTA was benched from the roster on September 25, 2023. He was replaced by Kaiky "noway" Santos on October 8.

The organization's female team made history after being the first invited to a Blast event, and also becoming the first women's team invited to an Intel Extreme Masters event, following invites to Blast Bounty Season 1 and IEM Katowice 2025.

Imperial acquired chayJESUS from Fluxo on January 30th, 2025. He is now benched on the team's roster. Portuguese player Shr was signed by Imperial on July 7, 2025, having previously played for SAW.

=== Notable achievements ===
- 3º–4º — BLAST Premier 2023 Spring Finals

=== Roster ===
Imperial Counter-Strike 2 roster
Players
Coaches

Handle	Name	Nationality
VINI	Figueiredo, Vinicius	Brazil
noway	Santos, Kaiky	Brazil
chelo	Cespedes, Marcelo	Brazil
decenty	Bacelar, Lucas	Brazil
levi	Gustavo, Guilherme	Brazil
skullz (I)	Medeiros, Felipe	Brazil

Head coach

- Vacant

Legend:
- (I) Inactive
- (S) Suspended
- Substitute
- (injured) Injury / Illness

Latest roster transaction: 15 June 2026.

Imperial fe Counter-Strike 2 roster
Players
Coaches

Handle	Name	Nationality
ANa	Dumbravă, Ana	Romania
tory	Kazieva, Victoria	Russia
twenty3	Timonina, Alexandra	Russia
Kat	Vašková, Katarína	Slovakia
wieenN	Gasanova, Narmina	Georgia

Head coach

- Kamen "bubble" Kostadinov

Legend:
- (I) Inactive
- (S) Suspended
- Substitute
- (injured) Injury / Illness

Latest roster transaction: 26 June 2025.
