= Blast Premier =

Professional esports league

- Official logo
- Formerly: BLAST Pro Series
- Game: Counter-Strike: Global Offensive; Counter-Strike 2
- Founded: January 2020
- Owner: Blast ApS
- No. of teams: 32 (Bounty); 16 (Open); 8 (Rivals)
- Headquarters: Copenhagen, Denmark
- Continents: Worldwide
- Most recent champions: Mouz (Bounty); Team Vitality (Open); Team Vitality (Rivals)
- Broadcasters: Twitch; YouTube
- Website: blast.tv/cs/

Blast Premier (stylized as BLAST Premier) is a Counter-Strike 2 (CS2) (previously Counter-Strike: Global Offensive) professional esports league launched in 2020. It is primarily based in two regions: North America and Europe.

The Danish esports organisation, RFRSH Entertainment, announced the series as a successor to the BLAST Pro Series in 2019. The 2020 Blast Premier Series experienced disruptions due to the COVID-19 pandemic, including the transition of all events except the Spring regular season online and reduced prize pools for many of the events. This disruption continued into the 2021 season, with both the Spring Groups and Spring Showdown occurring online.

== Format ==
The Blast Premier series is divided into two seasons per year: Spring and Fall. Each season lasts around four months with 16 regular season partnered teams participating in the Group stage, ending with a season finals for the 6 top teams from the group stage. The season finals are also open to two teams from each season's Showdown events, which are open to a much broader array of organizations, including those that did not advance in the regular season. Non-partnered teams usually qualify for the Showdown events via invites or via regional tournaments (One such example being the ACE North American Masters for teams from North America). The winner of each season's finals goes on to participate the Global Finals at the end of the year, as well as winners of other prestigious non-BLAST Premier events and those that rank highest in the BLAST Premier Global Leaderboard, a standings of the top events of the year from multiple leagues and tournaments.

In August 2023, Counter-Strike developer Valve announced that the partnership system that Blast Premier used would be abolished in 2025, forcing all tournament organizers to pivot to an open circuit or an invitational system using Valve's rankings. In order to prepare for the change to an open circuit, Blast announced that the 2024 Blast Premier season would feature 16 partnered teams: the previous 12 partnered teams that, with the exceptions of 100 Thieves, MIBR and Evil Geniuses (who had their spots sold to BIG Clan, Heroic and Cloud9 in 2021, 2022 and 2023 respectively), had been partnered since Blast Premier's inception, and four one-year affiliate teams, those being GamerLegion, Team Falcons, Team Spirit and Virtus.pro.

BLAST announced their plans for 2025 and beyond during the 2024 Spring Final in London. To align with Valve's new rules forcing their partnership system to cease, BLAST will use three formats: Bounty (a 32-team invitational tournament where teams receive bounties for winning matches against their opponents), Open (a 16-team tournament mimicking the Intel Extreme Masters), and Rivals (where the top 4 teams in the Valve rankings, plus the next-best teams in Europe, the Americas and Asia) will play each other in the old Final format). With this, 2024's World Final was the last BLAST Premier World Final.

== Partnered teams ==
Team	Year joined	Year ended
100 Thieves	2020	2021
MIBR	2020	2022
Evil Geniuses	2020	2023
Astralis	2020	2025
Complexity Gaming	2020	2025
FaZe Clan	2020	2025
G2 Esports	2020	2025
Team Liquid	2020	2025
Natus Vincere	2020	2025
Ninjas in Pyjamas	2020	2025
OG Esports	2020	2025
Team Vitality	2020	2025
BIG Clan	2021	2025
Heroic	2022	2025
Cloud9	2023	2025
Team Falcons	2024 (Note: Joined as affiliate partner.)	2025
GamerLegion	2024	2025
Team Spirit	2024	2025
Virtus.pro	2024	2025

== Editions ==
=== Partner league ===
Edition	Date	Venue, Host city	Champions	Runners-up	MVP	Prize pool	Ref.
Spring 2020: Regular Season	January 31–February 16, 2020	3 Mills Studio, London	FaZe Clan; Natus Vincere; G2 Esports	OG Esports; Complexity Gaming; Team Liquid	Not awarded	US$300,000	
Spring 2020 Europe Showdown	June 1–15, 2020	Europe / Online	Vitality; ENCE	Ninjas in Pyjamas	Not awarded	US$182,500	
Spring 2020 Americas Showdown	June 1–7, 2020	North America / Online	MiBR; Furia Esports	Evil Geniuses	Not awarded	US$142,500	
Spring 2020 Europe Finals	June 15–21, 2020	Europe / Online	Complexity Gaming	Team Vitality	Mathieu "ZywOo" Herbaut	US$500,000	
Spring 2020 Americas Finals	June 16–21, 2020	North America / Online	Evil Geniuses	MiBR	Tsvetelin "CeRq" Dimitrov	US$250,000	
Fall Series 2020	October 15–31, 2020	Europe / Online	OG Esports; Team Vitality; G2 Esports	Natus Vincere; BIG Clan; Astralis	Not awarded	US$300,000	
Fall Showdown 2020	November 24–29, 2020	Europe / Online	Furia Esports mousesports	Cloud9; Team Liquid	Not awarded	US$150,000	
Fall 2020 Finals	December 8–13, 2020	Europe / Online	Team Vitality	Astralis	Mathieu "ZywOo" Herbaut	US$425,000	
Global Final 2020	January 19–24, 2021	Europe / Online	Natus Vincere	Astralis	Oleksandr "s1mple" Kostyliev	US$1,000,000	
Spring Groups 2021	February 4–14, 2021	Europe / Online	BIG Clan; Complexity Gaming; Natus Vincere	Ninjas in Pyjamas; Evil Geniuses; FaZe Clan	Not awarded	US$150,000	
Spring Showdown 2021	April 13–18, 2021	Europe / Online	G2 Esports; Gambit Esports	Team Spirit; Heroic	Not awarded	US$162,500	
Spring Finals 2021	June 15–20, 2021	Europe / Online	Gambit Esports	Natus Vincere	Abay "Hobbit" Khassenov	US$425,000	
Fall Groups 2021	September 16–26, 2021	Europe / Online	Natus Vincere; Ninjas in Pyjamas; Team Vitality	FaZe Clan; BIG Clan; Astralis	Not awarded	US$150,000	
Fall Showdown 2021	October 12–17, 2021	Europe / Online	Heroic; Team Liquid	OG Esports; MAD Lions	Not awarded	US$162,500	
Fall Finals 2021	November 24–28, 2021	Royal Arena, Copenhagen	Natus Vincere	Team Vitality	Oleksandr "s1mple" Kostyliev	US$425,000	
World Final 2021	December 14–19, 2021	BLAST Studio, Copenhagen	Natus Vincere	Gambit Esports	Oleksandr "s1mple" Kostyliev	US$1,000,000	
Spring Groups 2022	January 28–February 6, 2022	Europe / Online	Team Vitality; OG Esports; Faze Clan	G2 Esports; Natus Vincere; BIG Clan	Not awarded	US$117,500	
Spring Showdown Europe 2022	April 27–May 1, 2022	Europe / Online	ENCE	Astralis	Not awarded	US$67,500	
Spring Showdown North America 2022	April 27–May 1, 2022	North America / Online	PaiN Gaming	Furia Esports	Not awarded	US$67,500	
Spring Finals 2022	June 15–19, 2022	Altice Arena, Lisbon	Natus Vincere	Team Vitality	Oleksandr "s1mple" Kostyliev	US$425,000	
Fall Groups 2022	August 19–28, 2022	BLAST Studio, Copenhagen	OG Esports; Natus Vincere; Team Liquid	FaZe Clan; Ninjas in Pyjamas; G2 Esports	Not awarded	US$117,500	
Fall Showdown Europe 2022	October 19–23, 2022	Europe / Online	Heroic	Astralis	Not awarded	US$67,500	
Fall Showdown North America 2022	October 19–23, 2022	North America / Online	Fluxo	MiBR	Not awarded	US$67,500	
Fall Finals 2022	November 23–27, 2022	Royal Arena, Copenhagen	Heroic	FaZe Clan	Helvijs "broky" Saukants	US$425,000	
World Final 2022	December 14–18, 2022	Etihad Arena, Abu Dhabi	G2 Esports	Team Liquid	Ilya "m0NESY" Osipov	US$1,000,000	
Spring Groups 2023	January 19–29, 2023	BLAST Studio, Copenhagen	Team Vitality; Faze Clan; G2 Esports	Natus Vincere; Heroic; Astralis	Not awarded	US$117,500	
Spring Showdown Europe 2023	March 29–April 2, 2023	Europe/Online	Cloud9	BIG Clan	Not awarded	US$67,500	
Spring Showdown North America 2023	March 29–April 2, 2023	North America/Online	Imperial Esports	PaiN Gaming	Not awarded	US$67,500	
Spring Final 2023	June 7–11, 2023	Entertainment and Sports Arena, Washington D.C.	Heroic	Team Vitality	Casper "cadiaN" Møller	US$425,000	
Fall Groups 2023	July 13–23, 2023	Copenhagen	FaZe Clan; Heroic; Ninjas in Pyjamas	Natus Vincere; Team Vitality; Astralis	Not awarded	US$177,500	
Fall Showdown 2023 Europe	October 4–8, 2023	Europe/Online	Cloud9	BIG Clan	Not awarded	US$67,500	
Fall Showdown 2023 Americas	October 4–8, 2023	North America/Online	Complexity Gaming	Team Liquid	Not awarded	US$67,500	
Fall Final 2023	November 22–26, 2023	Royal Arena, Copenhagen	Team Vitality	FaZe Clan	Mathieu "ZywOo" Herbaut	US$425,000	
World Final 2023	December 13–17, 2023	Etihad Arena, Abu Dhabi	Team Vitality	FaZe Clan	Mathieu "ZywOo" Herbaut	US$1,000,000	
Spring Groups 2024	January 22–28, 2024	Copenhagen	Virtus.pro; FaZe Clan; Natus Vincere; Team Vitality	Astralis; G2 Esports	Not awarded	US$190,000	
Spring Showdown 2024	March 6–10, 2024	Online	SAW; Team Spirit	OG Esports; Metizport	Not awarded	US$135,000	
Spring Final 2024	June 12–16, 2024	Wembley Arena, London	Team Spirit	Natus Vincere	Danil "donk" Kryshkovets	US$425,000	
Fall Groups 2024	July 29–August 4, 2024	Copenhagen	Team Liquid; G2 Esports; Team Vitality; Team Spirit	Astralis; Natus Vincere	Not awarded	US$190,000	
Fall Showdown 2024	August 21–25, 2024	Online	FaZe Clan; Team Falcons	OG Esports; Virtus.pro	Not awarded	US$135,000	
Fall Final 2024	September 25–29, 2024	Forum Copenhagen	G2 Esports	Natus Vincere	Ilya "m0NESY" Osipov	US$425,000	
World Final 2024	October 30–November 3, 2024	Singapore	G2 Esports	Team Spirit	Ilya "m0NESY" Osipov	US$1,000,000	

=== Open circuit ===
In August 2023, Counter-Strike 2 developers Valve banned tournament organizers from having "unique business relationships" with teams. As a result, Blast revamped their tournament format starting in 2025.

The new "Bounty" tournament assigns the 16 highest-rated teams of 32 bounties in addition to the regular prize money earned, where victorious teams claim half their opponent's bounty, with the other half added to their own bounty. The tournament will feature bests-of-three in a single-elimination format. The new "Open" tournament features 12 teams invited from the Valve Regional Standings, in addition to four teams qualified through new regional "Rising" tournaments, which feature invited teams as well as teams from open qualifiers. Open tournaments feature two groups of eight playing a double-elimination best-of-three bracket. "Rivals" tournaments involve eight directly invited teams competing in four-team double-elimination brackets, before a best-of-five grand final.

Edition	Date	Venue, Host city	Champions	Runners-up	MVP	Prize pool	Ref.
Bounty 2025 Season 1	January 13–26, 2025	Online/BLAST Studios, Copenhagen (Note: The round-of-32 and round-of-16 were held online before the tournament moved to an offline venue for the quarterfinals onwards.)	Team Spirit	Eternal Fire	Danil "donk" Kryshkovets	US$500,000	
Open Lisbon 2025	March 17–30, 2025	Copenhagen (Groups); MEO Arena, Lisbon (Playoffs)	Team Vitality	MOUZ	Mathieu "ZywOo" Herbaut	US$400,000	
Rivals 2025 Season 1	April 28–May 4, 2025	BLAST Studios, Copenhagen	Team Vitality	Team Falcons	Mathieu "ZywOo" Herbaut	US$350,000	
Bounty 2025 Season 2	August 4–17, 2025	Online/BLAST Studios, Malta	Team Spirit	The MongolZ	Danil "donk" Kryshkovets	US$500,000	
Open London 2025	August 25–September 7, 2025	Online (Groups); Wembley Arena, London (Playoffs)	G2 Esports	Team Vitality	Nikita "HeavyGod" Martynenko	US$400,000	
Rivals 2025 Season 2	November 10–16, 2025	AsiaWorld-Arena, Hong Kong	FURIA	Team Falcons	Ilya "m0NESY" Osipov	US$350,000	
Bounty 2026 Season 1	January 13–25, 2026	Online/BLAST Studios, Malta	PARIVISION	Team Falcons	Nikola "NiKo" Kovač	US$1,100,000	
Open Rotterdam 2026	March 18–29, 2026	Copenhagen (Groups); Ahoy Arena, Rotterdam (Playoffs)	Team Vitality	Natus Vincere	Robin "ropz" Kool	US$1,100,000	
Rivals 2026 Season 1	April 27–May 3, 2026	Dickies Arena, Fort Worth	Team Vitality	Natus Vincere	Mathieu "ZywOo" Herbaut	US$1,000,000	
Bounty 2026 Season 2	July 20–August 2, 2026	BLAST Studios, Malta	MOUZ	Team Spirit	Lotan 'Spinx' Giladi	US$1,050,000	
Open Porto 2026	August 24–September 6, 2026	Copenhagen (Groups) Super Bock Arena,Porto(Playoffs)	Team Spirit	MOUZ	Danil "donk" Kryshkovets	US$1,100,000	
Rivals 2026 Season 2	November 9–15	AsiaWorld-Arena, Hong Kong	TBD	TBD	TBD	US$1,000,000	

== World Team Of The Year ==
Year	Role	ID	Name	Team
2021	IGL	apEX	Dan Madesclaire	Team Vitality
2021	AWP	s1mple	Oleksandr Kostyliev	Natus Vincere
2021	Entry	NiKo	Nikola Kovač	G2 Esports
2021	Support	Perfecto	Ilya Zalutskiy	Natus Vincere
2021	Lurker	Hobbit	Abai Hasenov	Gambit Esports
2021	Coach	B1ad3	Andrii Horodenskyi	Natus Vincere

Year	Role	ID	Name	Team
2022	IGL	karrigan	Finn Andersen	FaZe Clan
2022	AWP	s1mple	Oleksandr Kostyliev	Natus Vincere
2022	Entry	YEKINDAR	Mareks Gaļinskis	Team Liquid
2022	Support	Perfecto	Ilya Zalutskiy	Natus Vincere
2022	Lurker	ropz	Robin Kool	Faze Clan
2022	Coach	B1ad3	Andrii Horodenskyi	Natus Vincere
