= Team Vitality =

French esports organisation

- Short name: VIT
- Founded: 5 August 2013; 13 years ago
- Based in: Paris, France
- Colors: Yellow and Black
- Chairman: Fabien Devide
- CEO: Nicolas Maurer
- Divisions: Call of Duty: Warzone; Counter-Strike 2 EAFC; Free Fire; Honor of Kings; League of Legends; Mobile Legends: Bang Bang; PUBG Mobile; Rennsport; Rocket League; Starcraft II; Street Fighter 6 Teamfight Tactics; Tekken; Valorant; Fortnite
- Partners: ASUS ROG; Fulllife; Evnia; Skin.Club; Crédit agricole SecretLab; Skin.Land; Magnum; Nescafé; Stake; Kick
- Website: https://vitality.gg

Team Vitality, or simply Vitality, is a French esport club founded in 2013.

Team Vitality has teams in ten PC/console esports titles (League of Legends, Valorant, Counter-Strike 2, Rocket League, EA FC, StarCraft II, Tekken, Street Fighter 6, Call of Duty Warzone and Teamfight Tactics), with several professional teams and content creators from across Europe and South Korea. Vitality also has teams in four mobile esports titles (Mobile Legends: Bang Bang, Honor of Kings, Free Fire and PUBG Mobile) under the name "Bigetron by Vitality" after they acquired the Indonesian organization Bigetron Esports in 2025. The organization has previously fielded teams in numerous other titles, including Call of Duty, Call of Duty Mobile, Fortnite, Rainbow Six: Siege, PUBG, H1Z1, Clash Royale, Street Fighter, Formula 1, Hearthstone, Gears of War and Arena of Valor, as well as previously operating in India.

Since 2019, the organization has made the Stade de France its training center, becoming the first resident club of the stadium.

In 2026, during the 2026 French student protests, looters smashed the display cases in the V.Hive and stole trophies won by Team Vitality, including the recently-won StarLadder StarSeries Fall 2026 Trophy. The looters posted a video on social media of them holding and celebrating stealing the trophy. They also stole V.Hive's computers and premium gaming chairs.

== League of Legends ==
Team Vitality entered the professional League of Legends on 9 December 2015, after it acquired Gambit Gaming's spot in the 2016 EU LCS Spring Split. The first player signed to the team at the time of the announcement was former TSM support Raymond "kaSing" Tsang. Five days later, Vitality announced the rest of their roster, which consisted of top laner Lucas "Cabochard" Simon-Meslet, jungler Ilyas "Shook" Hartsema, mid laner Erlend "Nukeduck" Våtevik Holm, and kaSing's former teammate, bot laner Petter "Hjarnan" Freyschuss. For their coaching staff, Vitality signed former Gambit Gaming coach Shaunz.

=== 2016 ===
During the 2016 EU LCS Spring Split, Vitality's roster was considered one of the top lineups in the league, finishing in third place with a 13–5 record, behind the surprise first place G2 Esports and second place H2k-Gaming. Cabochard and kaSing were elected to the split's All Pro Team, as the most outstanding players in their positions. In playoffs, however, they were upset by sixth place Fnatic and eliminated in the quarterfinals.

Before the start of the 2016 EU LCS Summer Split, Shook and Hjarnan left the team, the latter for health reasons. Vitality then signed Kim "Mightybear" Min-soo, the former jungler of Newbee, and acquired bot laner Park "Police" Hyeong-gi from Apex Gaming.

With the new match format, Vitality failed to live up to prior standards, accruing only three match wins throughout the summer regular season with a 3–9–6 series record. Shook returned four weeks into the season and became the starting jungler once again. After winning a tiebreaker against FC Schalke 04, Vitality secured seventh place and avoided playing in the relegation series, although they also missed playoffs.

=== 2017 ===
Prior to the start of the competitive season, Vitality again revamped its roster. Bot laner Pierre "Steeelback" Medjaldi was acquired from Team ROCCAT to replace Police, and Ha "Hachani" Seung-chan, a former support for KT Rolster, was signed to replace kaSing. In the jungle, Vitality initially looked toward Afreeca Freecs jungler LirA, but the deal unexpectedly fell through, as LirA reportedly felt uncomfortable with the move. Vitality instead ended up signing Lee "GBM" Chang-seok as a substitute mid laner, as well as jungler Charly "Djoko" Guillard of the EU CS team Millenium. Top laner Adrien "Alderiate" Wils and support Baltat "AoD" Alin-Ciprian were also signed with the team as substitutes.

With the reorganization of the EU LCS regular season format, Vitality was drafted into Group B for the 2017 EU LCS Spring Split, along with Origen, H2k, Splyce, and the Unicorns of Love. After opening the season with a 1–3 record over three weeks, Hachani was benched. Three days later, GBM moved to the starting mid laner position, while Nukeduck took over the vacant support position. Because of a continuous lack of success, Vitality kept reshuffling their roster around without significant improvement and ended far out of reach of playoff positions in fourth place of the group, only beating Origen twice and the last place team of Group A, Giants Gaming.

For the 2017 EU LCS Summer Split, Vitality signed support Oskar "Vander" Bogdan and got picked into a nearly identical Group B with the recently promoted Mysterious Monkeys instead of Origen. Despite mild improvements thanks to the roster change, Vitality once again finished fourth in their group.

=== 2018 ===
Vitality completely rebuilt their roster around top laner Cabochard going into 2018 and signed veteran jungler Erberk "Gilius" Demir, along with rookies mid laner Daniele "Jiizuke" di Mauro, bot laner Amadeu "Minitroupax" Carvalho, and support Jakub "Jactroll" Skurzyński, who together had won the 2018 Spring Promotion tournament while they were with Giants Gaming. The new roster surprised many with a 7–1 start to the spring regular season with their explosive playstyle; however, as other teams adapted to their strategies, Vitality began dropping games and finished fourth with a 10–8 record. Vitality ended fourth in playoffs as well after defeating H2k 3–2 in the quarterfinals and losing to Fnatic 1–3 in the semifinals and Splyce 2–3 in the third place decider match.

Following a mediocre 5–5 first half of the 2018 EU LCS Summer Split, Vitality signed veteran jungler Mateusz "Kikis" Szkudlarek after week five, hoping that he could improve the roster with his experience. Vitality finished the regular season in second place after winning two tiebreaker games against FC Schalke 04 and G2 Esports. Because of this improvement due to the roster change, Gilius decided to step away from the team as they were performing better with Kikis. In the semifinals Vitality lost against FC Schalke 04, but later managed to defeat Misfits 3–1 in the third place decider match—the latter result earned Vitality the second most championship points, qualifying them for the 2018 World Championship as Europe's second seed.

At the 2018 World Championship, Vitality were drawn into Group B along with LCK third seed Gen.G, NA LCS third seed Cloud9 and LPL favourites Royal Never Give Up (RNG). After going 1–2 in the first week, Vitality upset RNG in the second, but still ended third in their group with a 3–3 record, ending their worlds run.

On 20 November 2018, Riot Games announced Team Vitality as one of ten franchise teams of the newly rebranded League of Legends European Championship (LEC).

=== 2019 ===
For the 2019 LEC Spring Split, Vitality acquired jungler Lee "Mowgli" Jae-ha from LCK team Afreeca Freecs. The team finished the regular season in fifth place with a 10–8 record and later lost 0–3 to Fnatic in the quarterfinals. Vitality did not make any roster changes going into the 2019 LEC Summer Split and barely clenched a playoff spot after defeating SK Gaming in a sixth place tiebreaker match. In the first round of playoffs Vitality was knocked out by FC Schalke 04, who defeated them 3–1.

== Rainbow Six Siege ==
Team Vitality first acquired a Rainbow Six: Siege roster on Xbox One for the Xbox One Pro League in December 2015, shortly after the game was released. Vitality competed in all three seasons of the Xbox One Pro League and took first in Season Three. Vitality also placed second in the first and only Xbox One Six Invitational in February 2016. Following this, the Xbox One Pro League shut down and Vitality picked up a PC roster which consisted of Bryan "Elemzje" Tebessi, Julian "Enemy" Blin, Dimitri "Panix" de Longeaux, Jean "RevaN" Prudenti, Valentin "Risze" Liradelfo, and Sami "Stooflex" Smail as coach. Shortly after, the Vitality Rainbow Six: Siege Xbox One team transferred to PC as Vitality. Black with Quentin "Tactiss" Rousselle replacing Arnaud "BiOs" Billaudel a few months later. The original PC team then became known as Vitality.White. Stooflex and Elemzje left Vitality.White later that year in June with Jean-Baptiste "Hansen" Mace replacing Elemzje along with Laurie "Lyloun" Lagier and Julien "Kivvi" Serrier joining as coaches in September 2016. Vitality.Black then disbanded later in September, allowing Lyloun to join the main team. In February 2018, Valentin "Voy" Cheron replaced Hansen, only weeks before the Six Invitational 2018, the Rainbow Six: Siege world championship, where they placed 13th–16th, the lowest possible placement in the tournament.

On 12 March 2018, Vitality dropped their current roster after disappointing results at the Six Invitational 2018 and acquired the roster of French team Supremacy. This new roster performed better than the former, placing third in European Pro League Season 7, second in the Coupe de France 2018, and second at Dreamhack Valencia 2018, qualifying for the Six Major Paris 2018. Shortly before Dreamhack Valencia, BiOs returned to Vitality as a coach. At the Six Major Paris 2018, Vitality placed 5th–8th, after defeating both Team Liquid and PET Nora-Rengo, but being eliminated by Team Secret, the same team they were defeated by at Dreamhack Valencia. While performing well at offline events, Vitality struggle online and placed seventh in European Pro League Season 8, and lost the relegation match to ENCE. After being relegated to the Challenger League, Adrien "RaFaLe" Rutik and Florian "ZephiR" Perrot along with coach BiOs left to return to Supremacy. Morgan "rxwd" Pacy and David "sNKy" Khalfa replaced them while Lyloun became the primary coach.

After performing well in European Challenger League Season 9 during early 2019, Vitality played against long-time rivals Team Secret after losing to MnM Gaming (now Natus Vincere) in a match which determines who goes straight to European Pro League Season 10. Vitality defeated Secret 2–1 and qualified for European Pro League Season 10. Vitality competed in the Allied Esports Vegas Minor in which they placed 9th–11th after defeating PENTA and Team oNe, but falling to European team Chaos Esports Club and top North American teams Spacestation Gaming and Rise Nation. At Dreamhack Valencia 2019, Vitality defeated Korean team Cloud9 twice and lost to FaZe Clan in the group stage, and were eliminated in the quarterfinals by Chaos. During the halfway point of European Pro League Season 10, Vitality placed third by defeating top European teams such as Natus Vincere and Chaos. Additionally, Vitality defeated world champions G2 Esports 7–5 and lost only to Team Empire and Giants Gaming, who were placed first and second at the time respectively. During the European Six Major Raleigh qualifier, Vitality were favorites to win alongside Chaos. Vitality placed first after defeating teams such as PENTA Sports and BDS Esports, but being disqualified due to disconnecting from the match against ForZe Esports, who went on to win the qualifier and place 3–4th in the event. In the second half of the season, Vitality was still in the running for the Pro League Season 10 Finals, but were effectively eliminated due to losses against G2 and Empire, even though the team later beat Giants without losing a round. They placed 5th, just behind Empire and G2, but ahead of Chaos, PENTA, and GiFu Esports. Vitality placed second in the 6 French League 2019, after tying 3 times and only losing twice, against first place Giants Gaming.

After season 10 of Pro League, Spark and Quaal were benched and replaced by two time world champion of Daniel "Goga" Mazorra Romero of G2 along with Lucas "Hungry" Reich of PENTA.

Team Vitality announced on 16 March 2021 that they were benching Fabian and Goga, two of the most decorated Rainbow Six players of all time, and the immediate release of Hungry. They were replaced by Kaktus, P4 and Shiinka respectively. Team Vitality also hired ex-Rogue manager Robz. On 16 June 2021, Team Vitality released Fabian from the roster who immediately joined an organisation-less team along with his former teammate, Pengu.

== Rocket League ==
Vitality ventured into the professional Rocket League scene after it acquired the roster of Guess Who on 12 February 2018. The team was renamed Renault Vitality, after titular sponsor Renault.

Renault Vitality defeated G2 Esports on 23 June 2019 to win Season 7 of the Rocket League Championship Series. Kyle "Scrub Killa" Robertson was named Worlds MVP.

On 15 December, during the RLCS Season 8 Finals in Madrid, Renault Vitality was able to reach the final match again. This time they lost to NRG Esports in seven games.

On 15 January 2020, Vitality announced that they had released Scrub Killa.

At the same time, the new third player, Alpha54 was announced.

On 20 June 2021, Vitality won the European RLCS X Championship against Team BDS.

Vitality signed Victor "Ferra" Francal on 30 March 2022 as their head coach, replacing Mout.

Following the RLCS 2021–2022 Winter Major, Radosin from GRIDSERVE Resolve was added to the starting roster and Fairy Peak! was moved to the substitute position.

After the RLCS 2021/2022 season, Kaydop and Fairy Peak were replaced by saizen and zen.

During the RLCS 2022–2023 Winter Regional, Vitality qualified as the 4th seed for the Winter Major which is to be held in San Diego for the first time since the 2021–2022 season.

On 9 July 2023, Team Vitality won the RLCS Spring Major over Team BDS, after winning the EU Open, EU Cup and EU Invitational beforehand. This was the first time any Rocket League team swept all available tournaments for an RLCS split. The team won the World Championship on 13 August against Team BDS once more; this made Team Vitality the first team in RLCS history to win multiple World Championships, as well as extending their RLCS tournament winning streak to 5.

For the 2025 season; Team Vitality announced that Radosin had left the team. Alpha54 was moved to the inactive roster. Monkey Moon and Exotiik were signed on to the team. Kassio replaced Ferra as the team’s coach.

At the Birmingham Major, Team Vitality ended up going 3-0 into the Swiss. At main event, they were defeated at the hands of The Ultimates 4-2 and later was defeated by Furia 4-3.

At the Raleigh Major, Vitality also went 3-0 into the Swiss. At main event, they swept NRG Esports 4-0 but were eliminated in the semi finals 4-1 by Dignitas.

At the Esports World Cup Featuring Rocket League, they went on in Group D to beat Spacestation Gaming and Twisted Minds 3-0 to advance to the quarter finals.

In the playoffs, they beat NRG Esports 4-2 to advance to the semi finals, where they lost 4-3 to Geekay Esports and lost 4-3 in Overtime of the Third Place Match vs Team Falcons.

At the RLCS World Championship in 2025, they placed 12th after beating Spacestation Gaming 3-2 in a close series but then losing 3-1 to Team Falcons and Ninjas in Pyjamas to end their tournament run.

During the 2026 offseason, Team Vitality announced M0nkey M00n had left the team, who went on to join Twisted Minds. The coach Kassio retired from the sport. In October 2025, Team Vitality announced the signing of Gaspar “Stizzy” Rosalen from Dignitas and Eversax from Gentle Mates.

After exiting the RLCS World Championship 2026 in 9th-12th place, Stizzy, Zen, and ExoTiiK would leave the team.

== Counter-Strike 2 ==
ZywOo was recognized as the best player of BLAST Premier Spring Groups 2023 according to the organizers.

At Blast Paris Major 2023, Team Vitality claimed their first major title.

On October 11, 2023, zonic departed the team, he was then replaced by Rémy "XTQZZZ" Quoniam two days later, who had previously coached the team from December 2018 to December 2021.

Magisk left on November 3, 2023, amid reports of a move to Saudi Arabian organisation Team Falcons, following zonic joining Falcons two days prior. His place on the active roster was replaced by William "mezii" Merriman the following week, on November 8.

Robin "ropz" Kool joined the team on January 10, 2025 , replacing Lotan "Spinx" Giladi, following reports of Vitality allowing Spinx to explore his options. A month after the arrival of ropz, the team won IEM Katowice 2025, the organization's first IEM Katowice, and ropz's second following FaZe Clan's victory in 2022; followed by ESL Pro League Season 21; BLAST Open Lisbon; and IEM Melbourne 2025. With the win at Melbourne, Team Vitality has won 4 ESL events in the span of 10 consecutive events (IEM Cologne 2024, IEM Katowice 2025, ESL Pro League Season 21, IEM Melbourne 2025) and secured the fifth ESL Grand Slam (formerly the Intel Grand Slam). Vitality continued their winstreak at BLAST Rivals 2025 Season 1 and IEM Dallas 2025, furthering their LAN win streak to 30 matches. Vitality won the Austin Major 2025.

On November 19, 2025, Team Vitality was awarded Esports Team of the Year at the 2025 Esports Awards, while Mathieu "ZywOo" Herbaut won the PC Player of the Year award. It also won "Best Esports Team" at The Game Awards 2025, and ZywOo was nominated for "Best Esports Athlete". The team concluded the year by winning its second major of the season at the StarLadder Budapest Major 2025.

Team Vitality started 2026 with a loss at the BLAST Bounty Winter 2026 to Team Falcons in the semi-finals, and went on to win IEM Kraków 2026, beating Furia in the grand final. They went on to win PGL Cluj-Napoca, beating PARIVISION in the grand final 3-0. Vitality then won at the BLAST Open Rotterdam 2026, defeating Natus Vincere 3–0 in the grand final. The team added a win to their already impressive 2026 by winning IEM Rio 2026, winning against Team Spirit in a 3-0 fashion. With this win, they have secured their second ESL Grand Slam. Robin "ropz" Kool won his third, the first ever player to win it three times.

At PGL Masters Bucharest 2026, Vitality competed without apEX, as Justinas "jL" Lekavičius stood in and mezii took over the in-game leadership duties. Before the tournament, former professional player Ilya "Perfecto" Zalutskiy said that he expected the change to weaken Vitality because apEX normally handled the team's mid-round calls, although he believed the remaining players' individual form could still carry the team deep into the event. In the semi-finals, Nemiga swept heavy pre-match favourites Vitality 2-0 to reach the final. Vitality then finished fourth after another 0-2 defeat to MOUZ in the third-place match.

== FIFA ==
In December 2022, Team Vitality partnered with French association football club LOSC Lille to create a FIFA eLigue 1 team.

In September 2025, Team Vitality ended their contract with LOSC Lille.

In September 2025, Team Vitality partnered with association football club Paris Saint-Germain to create a new EAFC Team.

== StarCraft II ==
In February 2024, Team Vitality announced that they had acquired most of the Korean StarCraft II team ONSYDE to enter the game in time for IEM Katowice 2024. While this has not been confirmed, this acquisition may have been funded via the Saudi Arabia-operated Esports World Cup Club Support Program, which gave organizations in the program (which includes Team Vitality) a one-time cash stimulus if they wanted to enter new esports.

== Street Fighter 6 ==
On 28 May 2024, Team Vitality announced its return to the Street Fighter scene by welcoming two highly skilled players, the Canadian Sayff and the French Valentin "Valmaster" Petit.Similar to Vitality's entries into StarCraft II, Tekken, Rennsport and Mobile Legends: Bang Bang, this opportunity of recruitment may have been funded via the Saudi-operated Esports World Cup Club Support Program, of which Team Vitality is a member.

== Tekken ==
In April 2024, Team Vitality announced its return to the versus fighting scene with the famous fighting game Tekken. While the eighth installment of the famous saga has just been released, the French club welcomed the player Jeondding within its ranks. Similar to their entry into StarCraft II, this opportunity of recruitment may have been funded via the Saudi-operated Esports World Cup Club Support Program, of which Team Vitality is a member.

== Sim racing ==
On 7 May 2024, Team Vitality announced a partnership with R8G Esports, owned by former Formula One driver Romain Grosjean, to acquire the latter's ESL R1 slot, with ESL R1 being the main racing league of the then-closed alpha racing simulator Rennsport. Similar to Vitality's entries into StarCraft II and Tekken, this opportunity of recruitment may have been funded via the Saudi-operated Esports World Cup Club Support Program, of which Team Vitality is a member.

The team later departed from R1 and, in turn, the Rennsport competitive scene in 2026, but reaffirmed their commitments to sim racing, retaining their players from the series and focusing on other racing game platforms and competitions. Following their departure, Team Vitality also acquired Gran Turismo World Series competitors Kaj de Bruin, Antonio Santos, and Olympic Esports Series Motorsport gold medallist Kylian Drumont.

== Bigetron by Vitality ==
Team Vitality's first mobile esports venture was with a European Arena of Valor roster that competed in the Valor Series in 2018. Their second was with an all-Indian Call of Duty: Mobile team, announced on 26 March 2021. The COD: Mobile division of Vitality lasted until 2025.

On 13 May 2024, Team Vitality announced that it would enter Mobile Legends: Bang Bang esports by welcoming the former Bigetron Era female roster to its ranks, before signing a European Honor of Kings roster on 12 June. These opportunities of recruitment, as with others in 2024, may have been funded via the Saudi-operated Esports World Cup Club Support Program, of which Team Vitality is a member. The Honor of Kings roster in question was acquired by OG Esports in April 2025.

On 15 May 2025, Vitality announced that they would acquire the Indonesian organization Bigetron Esports, as well as its divisions, with their mobile games branch renamed to "Bigetron by Vitality". With the Bigetron acquisition, Vitality added a male Mobile Legends: Bang Bang roster that competes in the MPL Indonesia, a male academy roster which competes in the MDL Indonesia, a new Honor of Kings roster competing in the Indonesian Kings Laga, as well as PUBG Mobile and Free Fire rosters.

== Rosters ==
Team Vitality rosters

Counter-Strike 2
Handle	Name	Nationality
apEX	Madesclaire, Dan	France
ZywOo	Herbaut, Mathieu	France
mezii	Merriman, William	United Kingdom
ropz	Kool, Robin	Estonia
flameZ	Shushan, Shahar	Israel

EA FC
Handle	Name	Nationality
Ilian	Bouchi, Ilian	France
Rocky	Chevrey, Corentin	France

League of Legends (LEC)
Handle	Name	Nationality
Naak Nako	Okan, Kaan	Turkey
Lyncas	Nauncikas, Linas	Lithuania
FIESTA	An Hyeon-seo	South Korea
Carzzy	Orság, Matyáš	Czech Republic
Fleshy	Kemiksiz, Kadir	Turkey

League of Legends (LFL)
Handle	Name	Nationality
Potent	Bouchaffra, Mehdi Ahmed	France
Dawciu	Drzyzga, Dawid	Poland
Czajek	Czajka, Mateusz	Poland
Yakkey	Bistrian, Darius Eduard	Romania
Dekap	Ismail, Waleed Mohammed	Jordan

League of Legends Rising Bees
Handle	Name	Nationality
Owpi	Effraimidi, Mimi	Greece
Delicate	Giannopoulou, Chara	Greece
rym	Salloum, Rym	Venezuela
Cosmïc	Tranquillin, Charlotte	France
Honda	Latzel, Natascha	Germany

Mobile Legends: Bang Bang Men
Handle	Name	Nationality
Shogun	Huraihira, Dylont Ananda	Indonesia
Nnael	Simbolon, Manuel	Indonesia
Moreno	Sinulingga, Marcel Juan	Indonesia
EMANN	Sangco, Eman Llanda	Philippines
Finn	Hikmatullah, Muhammad Arifin	Indonesia
RYZAA	Mauriza, Muhd Rafi	Indonesia
Cliveee	Sutanto, Ervino Clice	Indonesia

Mobile Legends: Bang Bang Women
Handle	Name	Nationality
Fumi	Lim, Venny	Indonesia
Vival	Chen, Viorelle Valencia	Indonesia
Cinny	Siswanto, Cindy Laurent	Indonesia
Chel	Siswanto, Michelle Denise	Indonesia
Vivian	Indrawaty, Vivi	Indonesia

Rocket League
Handle	Name	Nationality
ExoTiiK	Bigeard, Brice	France
Stizzy	Rosalen, Gaspar	Spain
zen	Bernier, Alexis	France
Alpha54	Champeonis, Yanis	France

StarCraft II
Handle	Name	Nationality
Maru	Cho, Seong-ju	South Korea
Ryung	Kim, Dong-won	South Korea
Solar	Kang, Min-soo	South Korea

Street Fighter 6
Handle	Name	Nationality
	Sayff	Canada
Valmaster	Petit, Valentin	France

Sim Racing
Handle	Name	Nationality
	Cazaubon, Thibault	France
	Csincsik, Marcell	Hungary
Kaj	de Bruijn, Kaj	Netherlands
Kylian	Drumont, Kylian	France
	Jajovski, Erhan	North Macedonia
ASK78	Santos, Antonio	France
	Toman, Jiri	Czech Republic

Tekken 8
Handle	Name	Nationality
Jeondding	Sanghyeon, Jeon	South Korea

Legend:
- (I) Inactive
- (S) Suspended
- (L) On loan
- (2W) Two-way player
- Substitute
- (injured) Injury / Illness

== Structures ==
=== V.Hive ===
Vitality has its headquarters at V.Hive, located Boulevard de Sébastopol in Paris, since November 2019. This place of 1000m² is also the first physical link between the club and its fans, since a part is open to the public with shop, meeting place and cybercafé. In addition to this first venue open to the public, Vitality plans to develop this concept in Lyon, Marseille, London or Berlin.

=== Vitality Performance Center ===
Since 2019, Vitality has also invested in the Stade de France where its training centre, named Vitality Performance Center, is established, in a desire to professionalize its teams at the highest level. The team FIFA settled there in September 2019, then two others, the team Tom Clancy's Rainbow Six Siege replaced today by the team Rocket League and the academic team of League of Legends Vitality.Bee playing in LFL in the French championship, will follow in 2020. Finally, since 2023, the women's team of League of Legends uses from time to time the facilities to realize weeks of training at the highest level. Vitality also aims in the medium term to build an arena from 1500 to 2000 places inside the Stade de France to play its home matches.

=== Gaming House Berlin ===
As part of their respective participation in the LEC and Valorant Champions Tour, Vitality's main team on League of Legends and the Valorant train in a gaming house located in Berlin. Joined by the Counter-Strike 2 team since 2018, these 3 teams train in a healthy environment optimized to perform at the highest European and global levels.

=== Gaming House India ===
Since November 2018 and the fundraising with Indian billionaire Tej Kohli, Vitality is present on the game Call of Duty: Mobile, in order to bring players together and allow them to play at the highest level, the organization has invested in a gaming house in Navi Mumbai.

The Indian division had also acquired a Free Fire team, initially announcing Fab Indro as the coach of their roster on 28 January 2022 and parted ways on 6 March 2023.

=== Gaming House Jakarta ===
As part of the participation in the Esports World Cup, and the arrival on several new games including Mobile Legends: Bang Bang, the club invests in a gaming house located in Jakarta, Indonesia to ensure a healthy and optimized environment for performance.

Awards and achievements
Preceded by Season 6 Cloud9	Rocket League Championship Series winner Season 7 (2019); With: Fairy Peak!, Scrub Killa, Kaydop	Succeeded by Season 8 NRG Esports
Preceded by Season X Numerous regional champions	Rocket League Championship Series World Champion; 2022–23; With: Alpha54, Radosin, zen	Succeeded by 2024 Team BDS
Preceded by IEM Rio Major 2022; Outsiders	BLAST Paris Major 2023 winner 2023; With: apEX, ZywOo, dupreeh, Magisk, Spinx	Succeeded by PGL CS2 Major Copenhagen 2024; Natus Vincere
Preceded by Perfect World Shanghai Major 2024; Team Spirit	BLAST Austin Major 2025 winner StarLadder Budapest Major 2025 winner 2025; With: apEX, ZywOo, flameZ, mezii, ropz	Succeeded by IEM Cologne Major 2026; Team Falcons
