= Made in Brazil (esports) =

Professional esports organization

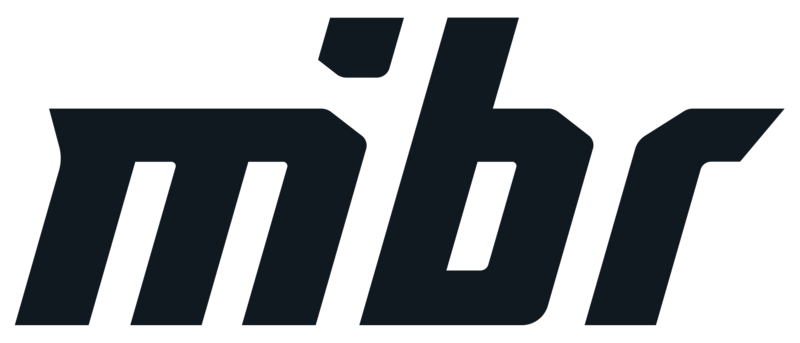
- Short name: MIBR, MiBR, mibr
- Game: Counter-Strike 2 Tom Clancy's Rainbow Six: Siege; VALORANT; Rocket League
- Founded: 1 March 2003; 23 years ago
- Location: Rio de Janeiro, Brazil
- CEO: Roberta Coelho
- Head coach: Nestor "LETN1" Tanić (Counter-Strike 2); Matheus "Budega" Figueiredo (Rainbow Six Siege); Jordan "stk" Nunes (VALORANT)
- Manager: Guilherme "Guille" Scalfi (Rainbow Six Siege)
- Partners: Itaú; Redragon; 1xBet; Monster Energy
- Parent group: Spun Mídia
- Website: www.mibr.gg

Made in Brazil, commonly referred to as the abbreviated name MIBR (stylized as MiBR or mibr) is a professional esports organization with players competing in Counter-Strike 2, Tom Clancy's Rainbow Six: Siege, VALORANT, and Rocket League. It was a member of the G7 Teams. MIBR was founded on March 1, 2003, in the city of Rio de Janeiro, when the Brazilian businessman Paulo Velloso decided to invest in his son's dream. The organization was dissolved in 2012, but announced it was making a return in March 2016, returning to active play years later in June 2018.

== History ==
In January 2018, the MIBR brand was acquired by Immortals. In June of the same year, the roster of MIBR was reformed with the core members of the Luminosity Gaming/SK Gaming roster that won the MLG Columbus Major 2016 and ESL One Cologne 2016. On August 3, 2019, the Immortals Tom Clancy's Rainbow Six: Siege lineup was transferred to the MIBR name days before the Six Major Raleigh 2019.

In September 2020, CSGO coach Ricardo "dead" Sinigaglia was banned from nearly all notable tournaments (those organized by ESL, DreamHack, BLAST Premier, Eden Esports, and Beyond The Summit) following a ban by the Esports Integrity Commission (ESIC) for abusing a bug allowing him to get an advantage over a competing team as a coach. Later that month, dead, Fernando "fer" Alvarenga, and Epitácio "TACO" de Melo were removed by the organization following terrible results in the past eight months and especially in the past two months after traveling to Serbia from the United States for a bootcamp in Europe during the COVID-19 pandemic. The same day, Gabriel "FalleN" Toledo announced his self-benching from the active MIBR lineup after stating his dissatisfaction with the organization's decision to remove fer and TACO. Vito "kNgV-" Giuseppe also said he "did not agree with the [removal of fer and TACO]." This left only kNgV and trk remaining on the active lineup, the two newest members of the team.

MIBR joined the Valorant Champions Tour as a partner team in the Americas League starting in 2023.

In October 2025, Spun Mídia acquired MiBR from Immortals Gaming Club to launch an esports vertical named EZOR.

== Rosters ==
MIBR rosters

Counter-Strike 2
Handle	Name	Nationality
brnz4n	Poletto, Breno	Brazil
insani	Yuji, Felipe	Brazil
kl1m (L)	Krivosheev, Klimentii	Russia
LNZ	Holtäng, Linus	Sweden
venomzera	Eduardo, Carlos	Brazil
saffee (I)	Costa, Rafael	Brazil

Valorant Champions Tour
Handle	Name	Nationality
tex	botsch, ian	Germany
Verno	Maust, Andrew	United States
aspas	Santos, Erick	Brazil
mazino	Rivas, Roberto	Chile
zekken	Patrone, Zachary	United States

Valorant Game Changers
Handle	Name	Nationality
bstrdd	Naguil, Paula	Chile
lissa	Lissa, Giulia	Brazil
meL	Millena, Melissa	Brazil
sayuri	Obam, Camila	Brazil
srN	Niderauer, Nicolas	Brazil

Rocket League
Handle	Name	Nationality
Reysbull	Duran Parra, Victor	Chile
Aztrø	Fellipe Lopes Gomes, Luiz	Brazil
Sad	Lima de Souza, Roberto	Brazil

Legend:
- (I) Inactive
- (S) Suspended
- (L) On loan
- (2W) Two-way player
- Substitute
- (injured) Injury / Illness
