= IEM Cologne Major 2026 =

Counter-Strike 2 tournament

- 2026

Tournament information
- Game: Counter-Strike 2
- Location: Cologne, Germany
- Dates: June 2–21, 2026
- Administrator: Valve; ESL
- Format: Three 16-team Swiss-system group stages 8-team single-elimination playoff
- Host: ESL
- Venue: Palladium (Stage 3); Lanxess Arena (Playoffs)
- Teams: 32
- Defending champions: Team Vitality
- Purse: US$1,250,000

Final positions
- Champions: Team Falcons
- 1st runners-up: FURIA Esports
- 2nd runners-up: Aurora Gaming; Team Spirit
- MVP: Ilya "m0NESY" Osipov

The Intel Extreme Masters Cologne Major 2026, simply known as IEM Cologne Major 2026, was the fifth Counter-Strike 2 Major Championship and twenty-fourth Counter-Strike Major overall. It was held in Cologne, Germany from June 2 to June 21, 2026, with the playoffs held at the Lanxess Arena, while each Stage 3 match was held in front of live audiences at the Palladium. The Major involved 32 teams, with each team directly invited to the event. It featured a prize pool of US$1,250,000.

Team Falcons were crowned Major champions after a 3–0 victory over FURIA Esports, claiming their first title. Falcons player Ilya "m0NESY" Osipov was awarded his first Major MVP.

== Background ==
Counter-Strike 2 is a multiplayer first-person shooter video game developed by Valve Corporation. It is the fifth game in the Counter-Strike series. In professional Counter-Strike, the Valve-sponsored Majors are considered the most prestigious tournaments.

The Major was announced August 3, 2025 after the final of that year's IEM Cologne tournament, and was the eighth organized by ESL, after last hosting Rio 2022.

Team Vitality were the Major's back-to-back defending champions, following a 2–1 victory over The MongolZ at Austin 2025 and a 3–1 victory over FaZe Clan at Budapest 2025, the most recent Major. They were eliminated following a quarterfinal defeat to Team Falcons.

== Format ==
The tournament involves three Swiss-system group stages before an eight-team single-elimination playoffs. The Major featured 32 teams directly invited according to their Valve Regional Standings (VRS). Eight teams are eliminated from each Swiss-system stage before the final eight teams compete in a single-elimination playoff bracket to determine a champion. Each match after the initial matchups of each stage and the initial matchups of the Playoffs Stage are seeded according to teams' Buchholz score.

In the first two stages, all matches except for progression or elimination matches, which are played as bests-of-three, are played in a best-of-one format. For the first time, all Stage 3 matches were played as best-of-three series. Additionally, each Stage 3 match was held in front of live audiences at the Palladium. Each match in the Playoffs Stage before the grand final is played in a best-of-three format, with the final being a best-of-five.

=== Map pool ===
On January 22, 2026, Valve released an update replacing Train with Anubis in the Active Duty map pool used for Majors.

- Ancient
- Anubis
- Dust II
- Inferno
- Mirage
- Nuke
- Overpass

== Talent ==
On May 29, 2026, ESL announced the full talent lineup for the Major.

=== Hosts ===
- OJ Borg (stage host)
- Freya Spiers
- Tres "stunna" Saranthus
- Eefje "Sjokz" Depoortere

=== Analysts ===
- Janko "YNk" Paunović
- Jacob "Pimp" Winneche
- Martin "STYKO" Styk
- Ashley "ashhh" Battye
- Peter "dupreeh" Rasmussen

=== Casters ===
- Chad "SPUNJ" Burchill
- Alex "Machine" Richardson
- Harry "JustHarry" Russell
- Hugo Byron
- Jason "moses" O'Toole
- Adam "Dinko" Hawthorne
- Conner "Scrawny" Girvan
- Mohan "launders" Govindasamy

== Teams ==
=== Qualification ===
Invites to the Major were distributed to each region according to their performance at Budapest 2025, with the number for each region past Stage 1 determined by the number of teams of each region that advanced to the next Stage. The 11 highest ranked European teams in the Valve Regional Standings (VRS) were invited to Stages 2 and 3, with five in Stage 2 and six in Stage 3. As no Asian teams advanced to Stage 2 at Budapest, Asia loses its Stage 2 slot, but retains its Stage 3 invite. The Americas region lost a Stage 3 invite but received an additional Stage 2 invite. The distribution of Stage 1 invites remained the same as in Budapest.

=== Invites ===
Below are the invited teams, according to their Valve Regional Standing as of April 6, 2026. ESL confirmed the invites on April 7.

| Region | Qualified Stage | | |
| Region | Stage 1 | Stage 2 | Stage 3 |
|---|---|---|---|
| Europe | GamerLegion; BIG Clan; BetBoom Team; B8 Esports; HEROIC; SINNERS Esports | Team Spirit; Astralis; G2 Esports; FUT Esports; Monte | Team Vitality; Natus Vincere; PARIVISION; Aurora Gaming; Team Falcons; MOUZ |
| Americas | M80; NRG Esports; Sharks Esports; Gaimin Gladiators; MIBR; Team Liquid | 9z Team; paiN Gaming; Legacy | FURIA Esports |
| Asia | TYLOO; Lynn Vision Gaming; THUNDER dOWNUNDER; FlyQuest | —N/a | The MongolZ |

=== Rosters ===
Below are the rosters for each qualified team, as confirmed on April 22, 2026.

==== Legends ====
The Legends rosters includes the eight teams directly invited to Stage 3 of the Major.

Legends Team Rosters
| Team Name | Core Roster | Coach | Substitute Player |
| Team Vitality | Dan "apEX" Madesclaire; Shahar "flameZ" Shushan; William "mezii" Merriman; Robin "ropz" Kool; Mathieu "ZywOo" Herbaut | Rémy "XTQZZZ" Quoniam | Luca-Adrian "lucaZ" Gavrilut |
| Natus Vincere | Aleksi "Aleksib" Virolainen; Valeriy "b1t" Vakhovskiy; Mihai "iM" Ivan; Drin "makazze" Shaqiri; Ihor "w0nderful" Zhdanov | Andrey "B1ad3" Gorodenskiy | Justinas "jL" Lekavicius |
| PARIVISION | Andrey "BELCHONOKK" Yasinskiy; Dzhami "Jame" Ali; Emil "nota" Moskvitin; Vladislav "xiELO" Lysov; Ivan "zweih" Gogin | Dastan "dastan" Akbayev | —N/a |
| Team Falcons | Maksim "kyousuke" Lukin; ~~Damjan "kyxsan" Stoilkovski~~; Ilya "m0NESY" Osipov; Nikola "NiKo" Kovač; René "TeSeS" Madsen | Danny "zonic" Sørensen | Finn "karrigan" Andersen (replaced kyxsan) (Note: Result of roster change following the benching of kyxsan on April 20.) |
| Aurora Gaming | Engin "MAJ3R" Küpeli; Caner "soulfly" Kesici; Ali "Wicadia" Haydar Yalçın; Özgür "woxic" Eker; Ismailcan "XANTARES" Dörtkardeş | Sezgin "Fabre" Kalaycı | Samet "jottAAA" Köklü |
| MOUZ | Ludvig "Brollan" Brolin; ~~Jimi "Jimpphat" Salo~~; Lotan "Spinx" Giladi; Ádám "torzsi" Torzsás; Dorian "xertioN" Berman | Dennis "sycrone" Nielsen | Adrian "xelex" Vincze (replaced Jimpphat) (Note: Result of roster change following the benching of Jimpphat on April 18.) |
| FURIA Esports | Gabriel "FalleN" Toledo; Kaike "KSCERATO" Cerato; Danil "molodoy" Golubenko; Mareks "YEKINDAR" Gaļinskis; Yuri "yuurih" Santos | Sid "sidde" Macedo | —N/a |
| The MongolZ | Usukhbayar "910" Banzragch; Garidmagnai "bLitz" Byambasuren; Anarbileg "cobrazera" Uuganbayar; Ayush "mzinho" Batbold; Sodbayar "Techno" Munkhbold | Erdenedalai "maaRaa" Bayanbat | —N/a |

==== Challengers ====
The Challengers rosters includes the eight teams directly invited to Stage 2 of the Major.

Challengers Team Rosters
| Team Name | Core Roster | Coach | Substitute Player |
| Team Spirit | Danil "donk" Kryshkovets; Boris "magixx" Vorobiev; Dmitry "sh1ro" Sokolov; Andrey "tN1R" Tatarinovich; Myroslav "zont1x" Plakhotia | Sergey "hally" Shavaev (Note: Will not attend.) | Dmitry "S0tF1k" Forostyanko |
| Astralis | Rasmus "HooXi" Nielsen; Jakob "jabbi" Nygaard; Love "phzy" Smidebrant; Gytis "ryu" Glušauskas; Victor "Staehr" Staehr | Casper "ruggah" Due | Max "MiGHTYMAX" Heath |
| G2 Esports | Nikita "HeavyGod" Martynenko; Nemanja "huNter-" Kovač; Matúš "MATYS" Šimko; Guy "NertZ" Iluz; Álvaro "SunPayus" García | Eetu "sAw" Saha | Vilius "tAk" Keserauskas |
| FUT Esports | Nikita "cmtry" Samolotov; Dmytro "dem0n" Myroshnychenko; Džiugas "dziugss" Steponavičius; Aulon "Krabeni" Fazlija; Laurențiu "lauNX" Țârlea | András "coolio" Fercsák | —N/a |
| Monte | Aurélien "afro" Drapier; Oscar "AZUWU" Bell; Aurimas "Bymas" Pipiras; Jack "Gizmy" von Spreckelsen; Aleks "Rainwaker" Petrov | Alexander "kakafu" Szymanczyk | —N/a |
| 9z Team | Franco "dgt" Garcia; Matias "HUASOPEEK" Ibañez Hernandez; Luciano "luchov" Herrera; Maximiliano "max" Gonzalez; Ignacio "meyern" Meyer | Bruno "BIT" Fukuda Lima | —N/a |
| paiN Gaming | Rodrigo "biguzera" Bittencourt; ~~Lucas "nqz" Soares~~; Guilherme "piriajr" Barbosa; João "snow" Vinicius; Vinicius "v$m" Moreira | Henrique "rikz" Waku | Rafael "saffee" Costa (replaced nqz) (Note: Stepped down for personal reasons on April 6.) |
| Legacy | Andrei "arT" Piovezan; Eduardo "dumau" Wolkmer; Bruno "latto" Rebelatto; Vinicius "n1ssim" Pereira; Guilherme "saadzin" Pacheco | Alan "adrrr" Riveros | —N/a |

==== Contenders ====
The Contenders rosters includes the sixteen teams directly invited to Stage 1 of the Major.

Contenders Team Rosters
| Team Name | Core Roster | Coach | Substitute Player |
| GamerLegion | Milan "hypex" Polowiec; Oldřich "PR" Nový; Fredrik "REZ" Sterner; Janusz "Snax" Pogorzelski; Sebastian "Tauson" Tauson Lindelof | Adrian "imd" Pieper | Denis "Grashog" Hristov |
| BIG Clan | Benjamin "blameF" Bremer; Josef "faveN" Baumann; Gleb "gr1ks" Gazin; Jon "JDC" de Castro; Johannes "tabseN" Wodarz | Sebastian "xenn" Hoch | Jason "JBOEN" Boe Nielsen |
| BetBoom Team | Kirill "Boombl4" Mikhailov; Timur "FL4MUS" Marev; Kirill "Magnojez" Rodnov; ~~Pavel "S1ren" Ogloblin~~; Aleksandr "zorte" Zagodyrenko | Artem "Fierce" Ivanov | Daniil "d1Ledez" Kustov (replaced S1ren) (Note: Replaced S1ren following reported visa issues.) |
| B8 Esports | Alexey "alex666" Yarmoshchuk; Dmytro "esenthial" Tsvir; Artem "kensizor" Kapran; Andrii "npl" Kukharskyi; Daniil "s1zzi" innyk | Ivan "maddened" Iordanidi | Volodymyr "k1n" Kozovyk |
| HEROIC | Christoffer "Chr1zN" Storgaard; Linus "nilo" Bergman; Tim "susp" Ångström; Yasin "xfl0ud" Koç; Simon "yxngstxr" Boije | Tobias "TOBIZ" Theo | Radu "HOLY" Vrânceanu |
| SINNERS Esports | Sebastian "beastik" Daňo; Kamil "kisserek" Banak; Mădălin-Andrei "MoDo" Mirea; Max "SHOCK" Kvapil; Jordan "stressarN" Manevski | Jakub "Bfull" Kokoška | Aleksandar "CacaNito" Kjulukoski |
| M80 | Josh "JBa" Barutt; Mason "Lake" Sanderson; Elias "s1n" Stein; Fritz "slaxz-" Dietrich; Michael "Swisher" Schmid | Rory "dephh" Jackson | Frank "M0nstr" Vopat |
| NRG Esports | Alexander "br0" Bro; Michael "Grim" Wince; Nick "nitr0" Cannella; Josh "oSee" Ohm; Aran "Sonic" Groesbeek | Damian "daps" Steele | —N/a |
| Sharks Esports | Danilo "doc" Barros; Victor "gafolo" Andrade; João "koala" Pfeffer; Máximo "maxxkor" Cortina; Daniel "rdnzao" Monteiro | Hélder "coachi" Sancho | Cristiano "D10S" Marques Sá Carvalho |
| Gaimin Gladiators | ~~João "felps" Vasconcellos~~; Henrique "HEN1" Teles; Jhonatan "JOTA" Willian; Luca "Luken" Nadotti; Gabriel "NEKIZ" Schenato | João "horvy" Horvath | Fernando "fer" Alvarenga (replaced felps) (Note: Replaced felps following the termination of his contract on April 16.) |
| MIBR | Breno "brnz4n" Poletto; Felipe "insani" Yuji; Klimentii "kl1m" Krivosheev; Linus "LNZ" Holtäng; Carlos "venomzera" Eduardo | Nestor "LETN1" Tanić | Bruno "brn$" de Araújo |
| Team Liquid | Jonathan "EliGE" Jablonowski; Mario "malbsMd" Samayoa; Keith "NAF" Markovic; Kamil "siuhy" Szkaradek; Roland "ultimate" Tomkowiak | Viktor "flashie" Tamás Bea | Steve "jokasteve" Perino |
| TYLOO | Yi "JamYoung" Yang; Dongkai "Jee" Ji; Jingxiang "Mercury" Wang; Qianhao "Moseyuh" Chen; Su "Zero" Jingshen | Weijie "zhokiNg" Zhong | Yuanzhang "Attacker" Sheng |
| Lynn Vision Gaming | Qihao "C4LLM3SU3" Su; Junjie "EmiliaQAQ" Tang; Lizhi "Starry" Ye; Zhe "Westmelon" Niu; Sike "z4KR" Zhang | Yifei "GUM" Dai | —N/a |
| THUNDER dOWNUNDER | Alistair "aliStair" Johnston; Tyson "asap" Paterson; Christopher "dexter" Nong; Jay "Liazz" Tregillgas; Tynan "TjP" Purtell | Eddie "viridian" Azzi | —N/a |
| FlyQuest | Joshua "INS" Potter; Justin "jks" Savage; Corey "nettik" Browne; João "story" Vieira; Declan "Vexite" Portelli | Aaron "AZR" Ward | —N/a |

== Stage 1 ==
Stage 1 featured sixteen directly invited teams based on their global Valve Regional Standings, competing in a Swiss-system bracket. Teams were initially seeded according to their Valve Regional Standing, with further matches seeded according to a team's Buchholz score. Teams with equal Buchholz scores were seeded according to their initial place in Round 1.

Sixteen teams competed for eight Stage 2 spots, with all matches besides elimination and progression matches, which are best-of-three, being best-of-one.

Stage 1 was played from June 2 to June 5, 2026.

| Pos | Team | W | L | RW | RL | RD | BS | Qualification |
|---|---|---|---|---|---|---|---|---|
| 1 | B8 | 3 | 0 | 61 | 48 | +13 | 1 | Qualification to Stage 2 |
| 2 | BetBoom | 3 | 0 | 52 | 23 | +29 | -2 | Qualification to Stage 2 |
| 3 | GamerLegion | 3 | 1 | 65 | 72 | -7 | 4 | Qualification to Stage 2 |
| 4 | M80 | 3 | 1 | 83 | 65 | +18 | -1 | Qualification to Stage 2 |
| 5 | MIBR | 3 | 1 | 61 | 44 | +17 | -3 | Qualification to Stage 2 |
| 6 | TYLOO | 3 | 2 | 107 | 93 | +14 | -1 | Qualification to Stage 2 |
| 7 | BIG | 3 | 2 | 102 | 83 | +19 | -5 | Qualification to Stage 2 |
| 8 | FlyQuest | 3 | 2 | 89 | 62 | +27 | -5 | Qualification to Stage 2 |
| 9 | Liquid | 2 | 3 | 67 | 78 | -11 | 5 | |
| 10 | NRG | 2 | 3 | 85 | 96 | -11 | 3 | |
| 11 | Lynn Vision | 2 | 3 | 53 | 81 | -28 | 1 | |
| 12 | THUNDER dOWNUNDER | 1 | 3 | 44 | 58 | -14 | 7 | |
| 13 | Sharks | 1 | 3 | 52 | 68 | -16 | 0 | |
| 14 | HEROIC | 1 | 3 | 63 | 63 | +0 | -7 | |
| 15 | Gaimin Gladiators | 0 | 3 | 16 | 52 | -36 | 2 | |
| 16 | SINNERS | 0 | 3 | 44 | 58 | -14 | 1 | |

Updated to match(es) played on June 5, 2026. Source:

=== Results ===
==== Round 1 ====
| 0–0 | June 2 | M80 | 1 | – | 0 | Lynn Vision | Cologne |
| | 12:30 CET | HLTV | | | | | |
| | | 13 | Inferno | | | 8 | |

| 0–0 | June 2 | SINNERS | 0 | – | 1 | FlyQuest | Cologne |
| | 12:30 CET | HLTV | | | | | |
| | | 14 | Ancient | | | 16 | |

| 0–0 | June 2 | B8 | 1 | – | 0 | TYLOO | Cologne |
| | 13:30 CET | HLTV | | | | | |
| | | 13 | Mirage | | | 6 | |

| 0–0 | June 2 | MIBR | 0 | – | 1 | THUNDER dOWNUNDER | Cologne |
| | 13:30 CET | HLTV | | | | | |
| | | 6 | Inferno | | | 13 | |

| 0–0 | June 2 | GamerLegion | 1 | – | 0 | NRG | Cologne |
| | 14:30 CET | HLTV | | | | | |
| | | 13 | Inferno | | | 10 | |

| 0–0 | June 2 | HEROIC | 0 | – | 1 | Sharks | Cologne |
| | 14:30 CET | HLTV | | | | | |
| | | 10 | Nuke | | | 13 | |

| 0–0 | June 2 | BetBoom | 1 | – | 0 | Gaimin Gladiators | Cologne |
| | 15:30 CET | HLTV | | | | | |
| | | 13 | Dust 2 | | | 4 | |

| 0–0 | June 2 | BIG | 0 | – | 1 | Liquid | Cologne |
| | 15:30 CET | HLTV | | | | | |
| | | 10 | Nuke | | | 13 | |

==== Round 2 ====
| 1–0 | June 2 | B8 | 1 | – | 0 | THUNDER dOWNUNDER | Cologne |
| | 17:35 CET | HLTV | | | | | |
| | | 13 | Dust II | | | 11 | |

| 1–0 | June 2 | GamerLegion | 1 | – | 0 | FlyQuest | Cologne |
| | 19:30 CET | HLTV | | | | | |
| | | 13 | Inferno | | | 11 | |

| 1–0 | June 2 | M80 | 1 | – | 0 | Sharks | Cologne |
| | 19:30 CET | HLTV | | | | | |
| | | 13 | Mirage | | | 6 | |

| 1–0 | June 2 | BetBoom | 1 | – | 0 | Liquid | Cologne |
| | 20:30 CET | HLTV | | | | | |
| | | 13 | Dust II | | | 9 | |

| 0–1 | June 2 | HEROIC | 0 | – | 1 | Lynn Vision | Cologne |
| | 17:30 CET | HLTV | | | | | |
| | | 11 | Dust II | | | 13 | |

| 0–1 | June 2 | MIBR | 1 | – | 0 | TYLOO | Cologne |
| | 18:45 CET | HLTV | | | | | |
| | | 16 | Nuke | | | 14 | |

| 0–1 | June 2 | SINNERS | 0 | – | 1 | NRG | Cologne |
| | 18:45 CET | HLTV | | | | | |
| | | 6 | Nuke | | | 13 | |

| 0–1 | June 2 | BIG | 1 | – | 0 | Gaimin Gladiators | Cologne |
| | 20:30 CET | HLTV | | | | | |
| | | 13 | Nuke | | | 1 | |

==== Round 3 ====
| 2–0 | June 3 | GamerLegion | 0 | – | 2 | BetBoom | Cologne |
| | 16:30 CET | HLTV | | | | | |
| | | 2 | Nuke | | | 13 | |
| | | 8 | Ancient | | | 13 | |
| | | – | Mirage | | | – | |

| 2–0 | June 3 | M80 | 0 | – | 2 | B8 | Cologne |
| | 19:00 CET | HLTV | | | | | |
| | | 11 | Ancient | | | 13 | |
| | | 20 | Inferno | | | 22 | |
| | | – | Dust II | | | – | |

| 1–1 | June 3 | NRG | 1 | – | 0 | FlyQuest | Cologne |
| | 14:30 CET | HLTV | | | | | |
| | | 13 | Mirage | | | 10 | |

| 1–1 | June 3 | Sharks | 0 | – | 1 | Lynn Vision | Cologne |
| | 14:30 CET | HLTV | | | | | |
| | | 5 | Overpass | | | 13 | |

| 1–1 | June 3 | Liquid | 0 | – | 1 | MIBR | Cologne |
| | 15:30 CET | HLTV | | | | | |
| | | 10 | Mirage | | | 13 | |

| 1–1 | June 3 | THUNDER dOWNUNDER | 0 | – | 1 | BIG | Cologne |
| | 15:30 CET | HLTV | | | | | |
| | | 7 | Inferno | | | 13 | |

| 0–2 | June 3 | TYLOO | 2 | – | 0 | SINNERS | Cologne |
| | 16:30 CET | HLTV | | | | | |
| | | 16 | Ancient | | | 14 | |
| | | 13 | Inferno | | | 10 | |
| | | – | Mirage | | | – | |

| 0–2 | June 3 | Gaimin Gladiators | 0 | – | 2 | HEROIC | Cologne |
| | 19:00 CET | HLTV | | | | | |
| | | 5 | Dust II | | | 13 | |
| | | 6 | Inferno | | | 13 | |
| | | – | Nuke | | | – | |

==== Round 4 ====
| 2–1 | June 4 | GamerLegion | 2 | – | 0 | BIG | Cologne |
| | 16:30 CET | HLTV | | | | | |
| | | 16 | Overpass | | | 14 | |
| | | 13 | Ancient | | | 11 | |
| | | — | Mirage | | | — | |

| 2–1 | June 4 | MIBR | 2 | – | 0 | Lynn Vision | Cologne |
| | 16:30 CET | HLTV | | | | | |
| | | 13 | Anubis | | | 5 | |
| | | 13 | Inferno | | | 2 | |
| | | — | Nuke | | | — | |

| 2–1 | June 4 | M80 | 2 | – | 0 | NRG | Cologne |
| | 19:00 CET | HLTV | | | | | |
| | | 13 | Ancient | | | 6 | |
| | | 13 | Inferno | | | 10 | |
| | | — | Mirage | | | — | |

| 1–2 | June 4 | THUNDER dOWNUNDER | 0 | – | 2 | FlyQuest | Cologne |
| | 14:00 CET | HLTV | | | | | |
| | | 10 | Anubis | | | 13 | |
| | | 3 | Inferno | | | 13 | |
| | | — | Dust II | | | — | |

| 1–2 | June 4 | TYLOO | 2 | – | 1 | Sharks | Cologne |
| | 14:00 CET | HLTV | | | | | |
| | | 6 | Nuke | | | 13 | |
| | | 13 | Inferno | | | 5 | |
| | | 13 | Anubis | | | 10 | |

| 1–2 | June 4 | Liquid | 2 | – | 0 | HEROIC | Cologne |
| | 19:00 CET | HLTV | | | | | |
| | | 13 | Nuke | | | 5 | |
| | | 13 | Inferno | | | 11 | |
| | | — | Dust II | | | — | |

==== Round 5 ====
| 2–2 | June 5 | TYLOO | 2 | – | 0 | Lynn Vision | Cologne |
| | 14:00 CET | HLTV | | | | | |
| | | 13 | Ancient | | | 5 | |
| | | 13 | Inferno | | | 7 | |
| | | — | Overpass | | | — | |

| 2–2 | June 5 | Liquid | 0 | – | 2 | FlyQuest | Cologne |
| | 16:30 CET | HLTV | | | | | |
| | | 2 | Anubis | | | 13 | |
| | | 7 | Inferno | | | 13 | |
| | | — | Ancient | | | — | |

| 2–2 | June 5 | NRG | 1 | – | 2 | BIG | Cologne |
| | 19:00 CET | HLTV | | | | | |
| | | 5 | Dust II | | | 13 | |
| | | 16 | Nuke | | | 12 | |
| | | 12 | Mirage | | | 16 | |

== Stage 2 ==
Stage 2 featured eight directly invited teams based on their Valve Regional Standings as well as eight teams qualified from Stage 1, competing in a Swiss-system bracket. Invited teams were initially seeded according to their global Valve Regional Standing, while the eight teams qualified from Stage 2 were seeded according to their final Buchholz score from Stage 1, with further matches seeded according to a team's Buchholz score in Stage 2. Teams with equal Buchholz scores were seeded according to their initial place in Round 2.

Sixteen teams competed for eight Stage 3 spots, with all matches besides elimination and progression matches, which are best-of-three, being best-of-one.

Stage 2 was played from June 6 to June 9, 2026.

| Pos | Team | W | L | RW | RL | RD | BS | Qualification |
|---|---|---|---|---|---|---|---|---|
| 1 | FUT | 3 | 0 | 59 | 48 | +11 | 2 | Qualification to Stage 3 |
| 2 | Spirit | 3 | 0 | 52 | 10 | +42 | 2 | Qualification to Stage 3 |
| 3 | G2 | 3 | 1 | 89 | 71 | +18 | 1 | Qualification to Stage 3 |
| 4 | BetBoom | 3 | 1 | 63 | 52 | +11 | -1 | Qualification to Stage 3 |
| 5 | 9z | 3 | 1 | 56 | 56 | +0 | -3 | Qualification to Stage 3 |
| 6 | Monte | 3 | 2 | 73 | 73 | +0 | 3 | Qualification to Stage 3 |
| 7 | B8 | 3 | 2 | 121 | 119 | +2 | -5 | Qualification to Stage 3 |
| 8 | Legacy | 3 | 2 | 87 | 65 | +22 | -7 | Qualification to Stage 3 |
| 9 | TYLOO | 2 | 3 | 62 | 80 | -18 | 3 | |
| 10 | BIG | 2 | 3 | 72 | 89 | -17 | 1 | |
| 11 | paiN | 2 | 3 | 86 | 84 | +2 | -6 | |
| 12 | M80 | 1 | 3 | 44 | 65 | -21 | 6 | |
| 13 | MIBR | 1 | 3 | 53 | 67 | -14 | 4 | |
| 14 | Astralis | 1 | 3 | 39 | 53 | -17 | -3 | |
| 15 | FlyQuest | 0 | 3 | 33 | 52 | -19 | 2 | |
| 16 | GamerLegion | 0 | 3 | 48 | 60 | -12 | 1 | |

Updated to match(es) played on June 9, 2026. Source:

=== Results ===
==== Round 1 ====
| 0–0 | June 6 | Astralis | 1 | – | 0 | GamerLegion | Cologne |
| | 12:30 CET | HLTV | | | | | |
| | | 13 | Ancient | | | 4 | |

| 0–0 | June 6 | 9z | 1 | – | 0 | FlyQuest | Cologne |
| | 12:30 CET | HLTV | | | | | |
| | | 13 | Dust II | | | 9 | |

| 0–0 | June 6 | FUT | 1 | – | 0 | B8 | Cologne |
| | 13:30 CET | HLTV | | | | | |
| | | 13 | Ancient | | | 11 | |

| 0–0 | June 6 | paiN | 0 | – | 1 | TYLOO | Cologne |
| | 13:30 CET | HLTV | | | | | |
| | | 9 | Mirage | | | 13 | |

| 0–0 | June 6 | G2 | 1 | – | 0 | M80 | Cologne |
| | 14:30 CET | HLTV | | | | | |
| | | 13 | Mirage | | | 8 | |

| 0–0 | June 6 | Monte | 1 | – | 0 | BIG | Cologne |
| | 14:30 CET | HLTV | | | | | |
| | | 13 | Mirage | | | 8 | |

| 0–0 | June 6 | Spirit | 1 | – | 0 | BetBoom | Cologne |
| | 15:30 CET | HLTV | | | | | |
| | | 13 | Mirage | | | 5 | |

| 0–0 | June 6 | Legacy | 0 | – | 1 | MIBR | Cologne |
| | 15:30 CET | HLTV | | | | | |
| | | 8 | Nuke | | | 13 | |

==== Round 2 ====
| 1–0 | June 6 | FUT | 1 | – | 0 | TYLOO | Cologne |
| | 17:30 CET | HLTV | | | | | |
| | | 13 | Overpass | | | 9 | |

| 1–0 | June 6 | Astralis | 0 | – | 1 | 9z | Cologne |
| | 17:30 CET | HLTV | | | | | |
| | | 5 | Nuke | | | 13 | |

| 1–0 | June 6 | G2 | 1 | – | 0 | Monte | Cologne |
| | 18:30 CET | HLTV | | | | | |
| | | 22 | Mirage | | | 19 | |

| 1–0 | June 6 | Spirit | 1 | – | 0 | MIBR | Cologne |
| | 20:30 CET | HLTV | | | | | |
| | | 13 | Mirage | | | 1 | |

| 0–1 | June 6 | paiN | 0 | – | 1 | BIG | Cologne |
| | 18:30 CET | HLTV | | | | | |
| | | 9 | Overpass | | | 13 | |

| 0–1 | June 6 | BetBoom | 1 | – | 0 | GamerLegion | Cologne |
| | 19:30 CET | HLTV | | | | | |
| | | 13 | Nuke | | | 9 | |

| 0–1 | June 6 | Legacy | 1 | – | 0 | FlyQuest | Cologne |
| | 19:30 CET | HLTV | | | | | |
| | | 13 | Dust II | | | 7 | |

| 0–1 | June 6 | B8 | 0 | – | 1 | M80 | Cologne |
| | 20:30 CET | HLTV | | | | | |
| | | 10 | Mirage | | | 13 | |

==== Round 3 ====
| 2–0 | June 7 | G2 | 1 | – | 2 | FUT | Cologne |
| | 19:00 CET | HLTV | | | | | |
| | | 11 | Anubis | | | 13 | |
| | | 13 | Overpass | | | 7 | |
| | | 4 | Ancient | | | 13 | |

| 2–0 | June 7 | Spirit | 2 | – | 0 | 9z | Cologne |
| | 19:00 CET | HLTV | | | | | |
| | | 13 | Mirage | | | 3 | |
| | | 13 | Nuke | | | 1 | |
| | | — | Dust II | | | — | |

| 1–1 | June 7 | Monte | 1 | – | 0 | Legacy | Cologne |
| | 14:30 CET | HLTV | | | | | |
| | | 13 | Ancient | | | 11 | |

| 1–1 | June 7 | Astralis | 0 | – | 1 | TYLOO | Cologne |
| | 14:30 CET | HLTV | | | | | |
| | | 6 | Nuke | | | 13 | |

| 1–1 | June 7 | BetBoom | 1 | – | 0 | M80 | Cologne |
| | 15:30 CET | HLTV | | | | | |
| | | 13 | Dust II | | | 2 | |

| 1–1 | June 7 | MIBR | 0 | – | 1 | BIG | Cologne |
| | 15:30 CET | HLTV | | | | | |
| | | 8 | Inferno | | | 13 | |

| 0–2 | June 7 | B8 | 2 | – | 1 | GamerLegion | Cologne |
| | 16:30 CET | HLTV | | | | | |
| | | 13 | Inferno | | | 11 | |
| | | 8 | Mirage | | | 13 | |
| | | 13 | Nuke | | | 11 | |

| 0–2 | June 7 | FlyQuest | 0 | – | 2 | paiN | Cologne |
| | 16:30 CET | HLTV | | | | | |
| | | 7 | Nuke | | | 13 | |
| | | 10 | Anubis | | | 13 | |
| | | — | Dust II | | | — | |

==== Round 4 ====
| 2–1 | June 8 | Monte | 1 | – | 2 | BetBoom | Cologne |
| | 16:30 CET | HLTV | | | | | |
| | | 7 | Nuke | | | 13 | |
| | | 13 | Mirage | | | 6 | |
| | | 8 | Dust II | | | 13 | |

| 2–1 | June 8 | TYLOO | 0 | – | 2 | 9z | Cologne |
| | 16:30 CET | HLTV | | | | | |
| | | 10 | Overpass | | | 13 | |
| | | 6 | Inferno | | | 13 | |
| | | — | Nuke | | | — | |

| 2–1 | June 8 | G2 | 2 | – | 0 | BIG | Cologne |
| | 19:00 CET | HLTV | | | | | |
| | | 13 | Inferno | | | 3 | |
| | | 13 | Mirage | | | 8 | |
| | | — | Overpass | | | — | |

| 1–2 | June 8 | Astralis | 0 | – | 2 | paiN | Cologne |
| | 14:00 CET | HLTV | | | | | |
| | | 11 | Nuke | | | 13 | |
| | | 4 | Overpass | | | 13 | |
| | | — | Mirage | | | — | |

| 1–2 | June 8 | MIBR | 1 | – | 2 | B8 | Cologne |
| | 14:00 CET | HLTV | | | | | |
| | | 13 | Mirage | | | 7 | |
| | | 10 | Nuke | | | 13 | |
| | | 8 | Ancient | | | 13 | |

| 1–2 | June 8 | M80 | 0 | – | 2 | Legacy | Cologne |
| | 19:00 CET | HLTV | | | | | |
| | | 8 | Dust II | | | 13 | |
| | | 13 | Inferno | | | 16 | |
| | | — | Mirage | | | — | |

==== Round 5 ====
| 2–2 | June 9 | Monte | 2 | – | 0 | paiN | Cologne |
| | 14:00 CET | HLTV | | | | | |
| | | 13 | Nuke | | | 5 | |
| | | 13 | Dust II | | | 11 | |
| | | — | Mirage | | | — | |

| 2–2 | June 9 | Legacy | 2 | – | 0 | TYLOO | Cologne |
| | 16:30 CET | HLTV | | | | | |
| | | 13 | Mirage | | | 7 | |
| | | 13 | Inferno | | | 4 | |
| | | — | Nuke | | | — | |

| 2–2 | June 9 | BIG | 1 | – | 2 | B8 | Cologne |
| | 19:00 CET | HLTV | | | | | |
| | | 13 | Ancient | | | 7 | |
| | | 6 | Overpass | | | 13 | |
| | | 8 | Dust II | | | 13 | |

== Stage 3 ==
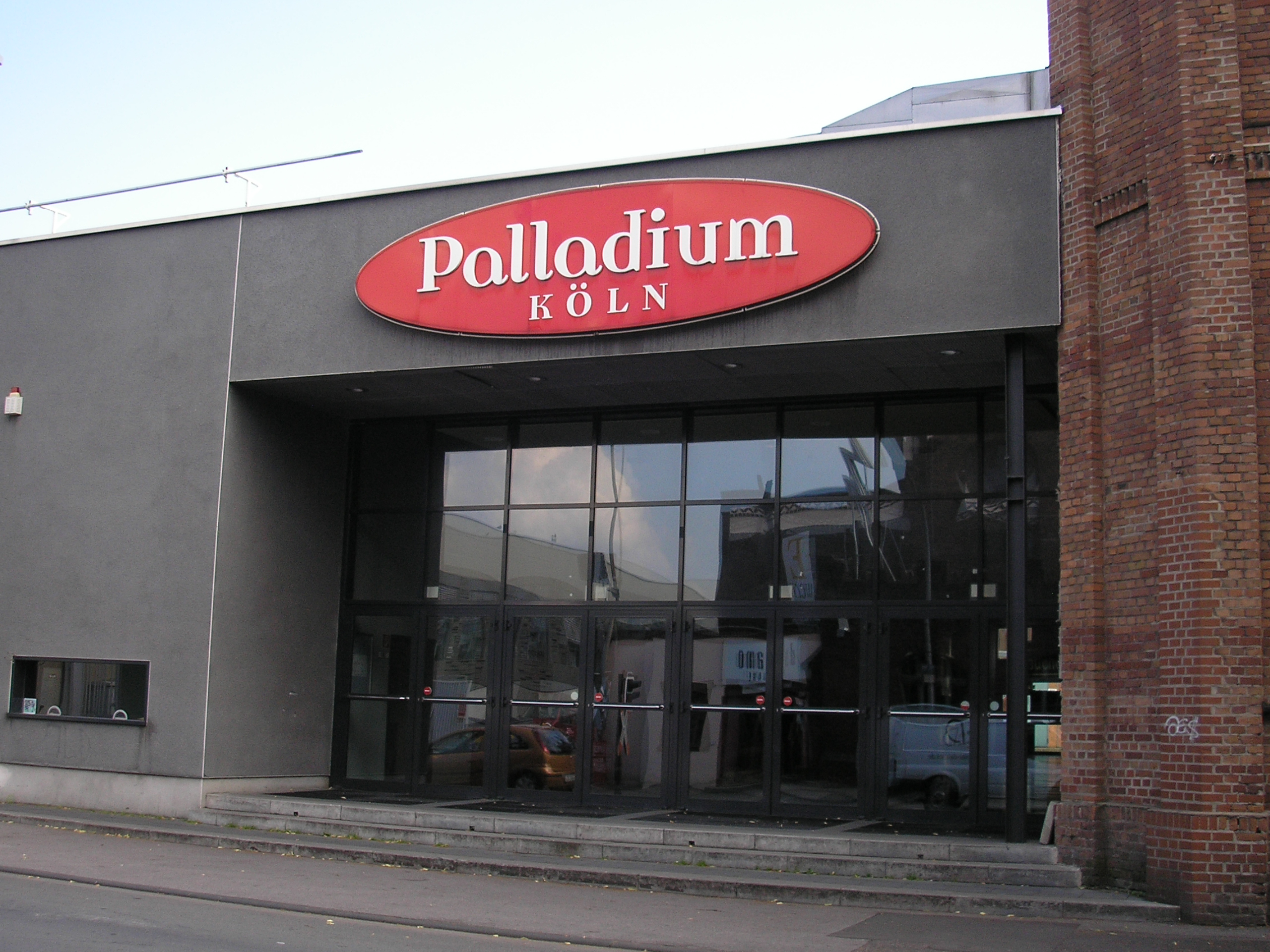
Stage 3 matches took place in the Palladium concert hall.

Stage 3 featured eight directly invited teams based on their Valve Regional Standings as well as eight teams qualified from Stage 2, competing in a Swiss-system bracket. Invited teams were initially seeded according to their global Valve Regional Standing, while the eight teams qualified from Stage 2 were seeded according to their final Buchholz score from Stage 2, with further matches seeded according to a team's Buchholz score in Stage 3. Teams with equal Buchholz scores were seeded according to their initial place in Round 3.

Sixteen teams competed for eight Playoffs Stage spots, with all matches being best-of-three for the first time at a Major.

On June 13, following their 2–0 victory over PARIVISION, ESL barred Legacy coach Alan "adrrr" Riveros from further participation in the Major after receiving multiple warnings for communicating with players outside of timeouts.

Stage 3 was played from June 11 to June 15, 2026, at the Palladium.

| Pos | Team | W | L | RW | RL | RD | BS | Qualification |
|---|---|---|---|---|---|---|---|---|
| 1 | Spirit | 3 | 0 | 105 | 74 | +31 | 2 | Qualification to Playoffs Stage |
| 2 | FURIA | 3 | 0 | 83 | 51 | +32 | -5 | Qualification to Playoffs Stage |
| 3 | Aurora | 3 | 1 | 100 | 73 | +27 | 3 | Qualification to Playoffs Stage |
| 4 | Vitality | 3 | 1 | 123 | 98 | +25 | -1 | Qualification to Playoffs Stage |
| 5 | Falcons | 3 | 1 | 136 | 124 | +12 | -1 | Qualification to Playoffs Stage |
| 6 | BetBoom | 3 | 2 | 120 | 117 | +3 | 5 | Qualification to Playoffs Stage |
| 7 | 9z | 3 | 2 | 139 | 142 | -3 | 3 | Qualification to Playoffs Stage |
| 8 | G2 | 3 | 2 | 147 | 140 | +7 | 0 | Qualification to Playoffs Stage |
| 9 | Natus Vincere | 2 | 3 | 141 | 151 | -10 | 3 | |
| 10 | FUT | 2 | 3 | 136 | 153 | -17 | -1 | |
| 11 | The MongolZ | 2 | 3 | 142 | 148 | -6 | -4 | |
| 12 | MOUZ | 1 | 3 | 108 | 111 | -3 | 2 | |
| 13 | Monte | 1 | 3 | 113 | 125 | -12 | 0 | |
| 14 | Legacy | 1 | 3 | 68 | 103 | -35 | -5 | |
| 15 | B8 | 0 | 3 | 64 | 91 | -27 | 1 | |
| 16 | PARIVISION | 0 | 3 | 75 | 99 | -24 | -3 | |

Updated to match(es) played on June 15, 2026. Source:

=== Results ===
==== Round 1 ====
| 0–0 | June 11 | PARIVISION | 1 | – | 2 | 9z | Cologne |
| | 11:00 CET | HLTV | | | | | Palladium |
| | | 1 | Overpass | | | 13 | |
| | | 13 | Dust II | | | 8 | |
| | | 9 | Inferno | | | 13 | |

| 0–0 | June 11 | The MongolZ | 1 | – | 2 | BetBoom | Cologne |
| | 11:00 CET | HLTV | | | | | Palladium |
| | | 13 | Dust II | | | 11 | |
| | | 6 | Mirage | | | 13 | |
| | | 11 | Ancient | | | 13 | |

| 0–0 | June 11 | Vitality | 2 | – | 1 | FUT | Cologne |
| | 13:30 CET | HLTV | | | | | Palladium |
| | | 5 | Anubis | | | 13 | |
| | | 13 | Overpass | | | 2 | |
| | | 13 | Nuke | | | 8 | |

| 0–0 | June 11 | MOUZ | 2 | – | 0 | Legacy | Cologne |
| | 13:30 CET | HLTV | | | | | Palladium |
| | | 13 | Dust II | | | 5 | |
| | | 13 | Nuke | | | 6 | |
| | | — | Mirage | | | — | |

| 0–0 | June 11 | Falcons | 2 | – | 1 | G2 | Cologne |
| | 16:00 CET | HLTV | | | | | Palladium |
| | | 10 | Inferno | | | 13 | |
| | | 13 | Dust II | | | 8 | |
| | | 16 | Ancient | | | 13 | |

| 0–0 | June 11 | FURIA | 2 | – | 0 | B8 | Cologne |
| | 16:00 CET | HLTV | | | | | Palladium |
| | | 13 | Mirage | | | 10 | |
| | | 13 | Inferno | | | 4 | |
| | | — | Nuke | | | — | |

| 0–0 | June 11 | Natus Vincere | 0 | – | 2 | Spirit | Cologne |
| | 18:30 CET | HLTV | | | | | Palladium |
| | | 1 | Dust II | | | 13 | |
| | | 8 | Anubis | | | 13 | |
| | | — | Mirage | | | — | |

| 0–0 | June 11 | Aurora | 2 | – | 0 | Monte | Cologne |
| | 18:30 CET | HLTV | | | | | Palladium |
| | | 13 | Nuke | | | 10 | |
| | | 13 | Anubis | | | 7 | |
| | | — | Dust II | | | — | |

==== Round 2 ====
| 1–0 | June 12 | FURIA | 2 | – | 1 | MOUZ | Cologne |
| | 11:00 CET | HLTV | | | | | Palladium |
| | | 13 | Nuke | | | 5 | |
| | | 5 | Inferno | | | 13 | |
| | | 13 | Overpass | | | 7 | |

| 1–0 | June 12 | Falcons | 0 | – | 2 | BetBoom | Cologne |
| | 16:00 CET | HLTV | | | | | Palladium |
| | | 11 | Nuke | | | 13 | |
| | | 10 | Ancient | | | 13 | |
| | | — | Dust II | | | — | |

| 1–0 | June 12 | Aurora | 1 | – | 2 | Spirit | Cologne |
| | 18:30 CET | HLTV | | | | | Palladium |
| | | 13 | Dust II | | | 9 | |
| | | 4 | Anubis | | | 13 | |
| | | 5 | Nuke | | | 13 | |

| 1–0 | June 12 | Vitality | 1 | – | 2 | 9z | Cologne |
| | 18:30 CET | HLTV | | | | | Palladium |
| | | 13 | Inferno | | | 4 | |
| | | 9 | Mirage | | | 13 | |
| | | 11 | Dust II | | | 13 | |

| 0–1 | June 12 | The MongolZ | 2 | – | 0 | B8 | Cologne |
| | 11:00 CET | HLTV | | | | | Palladium |
| | | 16 | Mirage | | | 14 | |
| | | 13 | Overpass | | | 3 | |
| | | — | Dust II | | | — | |

| 0–1 | June 12 | FUT | 1 | – | 2 | G2 | Cologne |
| | 13:30 CET | HLTV | | | | | Palladium |
| | | 5 | Overpass | | | 13 | |
| | | 13 | Ancient | | | 6 | |
| | | 9 | Mirage | | | 13 | |

| 0–1 | June 12 | PARIVISION | 1 | – | 2 | Monte | Cologne |
| | 13:30 CET | HLTV | | | | | Palladium |
| | | 13 | Mirage | | | 7 | |
| | | 9 | Ancient | | | 13 | |
| | | 5 | Inferno | | | 13 | |

| 0–1 | June 12 | Natus Vincere | 2 | – | 0 | Legacy | Cologne |
| | 16:00 CET | HLTV | | | | | Palladium |
| | | 13 | Inferno | | | 4 | |
| | | 13 | Ancient | | | 10 | |
| | | — | Mirage | | | — | |

==== Round 3 ====
| 2–0 | June 13 | BetBoom | 0 | – | 2 | FURIA | Cologne |
| | 19:40 CET | HLTV | | | | | Palladium |
| | | 6 | Overpass | | | 13 | |
| | | 6 | Dust II | | | 13 | |
| | | — | Nuke | | | — | |

| 2–0 | June 13 | Spirit | 2 | – | 1 | 9z | Cologne |
| | 20:55 CET | HLTV | | | | | Palladium |
| | | 12 | Overpass | | | 16 | |
| | | 16 | Mirage | | | 13 | |
| | | 16 | Dust II | | | 14 | |

| 1–1 | June 13 | Natus Vincere | 2 | – | 1 | The MongolZ | Cologne |
| | 11:00 CET | HLTV | | | | | Palladium |
| | | 8 | Nuke | | | 13 | |
| | | 16 | Ancient | | | 13 | |
| | | 13 | Mirage | | | 6 | |

| 1–1 | June 13 | Falcons | 2 | – | 1 | Monte | Cologne |
| | 14:15 CET | HLTV | | | | | Palladium |
| | | 13 | Inferno | | | 9 | |
| | | 11 | Dust II | | | 13 | |
| | | 13 | Mirage | | | 10 | |

| 1–1 | June 13 | Aurora | 2 | – | 0 | G2 | Cologne |
| | 14:20 CET | HLTV | | | | | Palladium |
| | | 13 | Overpass | | | 8 | |
| | | 13 | Anubis | | | 7 | |
| | | — | Inferno | | | — | |

| 1–1 | June 13 | Vitality | 2 | – | 1 | MOUZ | Cologne |
| | 16:35 CET | HLTV | | | | | Palladium |
| | | 13 | Mirage | | | 9 | |
| | | 7 | Dust II | | | 13 | |
| | | 13 | Inferno | | | 4 | |

| 0–2 | June 13 | B8 | 1 | – | 2 | FUT | Cologne |
| | 11:00 CET | HLTV | | | | | Palladium |
| | | 13 | Dust II | | | 10 | |
| | | 9 | Mirage | | | 13 | |
| | | 11 | Ancient | | | 13 | |

| 0–2 | June 13 | PARIVISION | 0 | – | 2 | Legacy | Cologne |
| | 17:45 CET | HLTV | | | | | Palladium |
| | | 12 | Inferno | | | 16 | |
| | | 13 | Dust II | | | 16 | |
| | | — | Mirage | | | — | |

==== Round 4 ====
| 2–1 | June 14 | BetBoom | 0 | – | 2 | Vitality | Cologne |
| | 16:30 CET | HLTV | | | | | Palladium |
| | | 8 | Overpass | | | 13 | |
| | | 11 | Nuke | | | 13 | |
| | | — | Mirage | | | — | |

| 2–1 | June 14 | Aurora | 2 | – | 0 | 9z | Cologne |
| | 16:30 CET | HLTV | | | | | Palladium |
| | | 13 | Nuke | | | 1 | |
| | | 13 | Dust II | | | 5 | |
| | | — | Inferno | | | — | |

| 2–1 | June 14 | Natus Vincere | 1 | – | 2 | Falcons | Cologne |
| | 19:00 CET | HLTV | | | | | Palladium |
| | | 3 | Dust II | | | 13 | |
| | | 13 | Mirage | | | 7 | |
| | | 16 | Anubis | | | 19 | |

| 1–2 | June 14 | MOUZ | 1 | – | 2 | FUT | Cologne |
| | 14:00 CET | HLTV | | | | | Palladium |
| | | 11 | Ancient | | | 13 | |
| | | 13 | Nuke | | | 10 | |
| | | 7 | Mirage | | | 13 | |

| 1–2 | June 14 | The MongolZ | 2 | – | 1 | Monte | Cologne |
| | 14:00 CET | HLTV | | | | | Palladium |
| | | 9 | Nuke | | | 13 | |
| | | 13 | Inferno | | | 7 | |
| | | 13 | Dust II | | | 11 | |

| 1–2 | June 14 | G2 | 2 | – | 0 | Legacy | Cologne |
| | 19:00 CET | HLTV | | | | | Palladium |
| | | 13 | Dust II | | | 7 | |
| | | 13 | Overpass | | | 4 | |
| | | — | Inferno | | | — | |

==== Round 5 ====
| 2–2 | June 15 | 9z | 2 | – | 0 | The MongolZ | Cologne |
| | 14:00 CET | HLTV | | | | | Palladium |
| | | 13 | Inferno | | | 8 | |
| | | 13 | Overpass | | | 8 | |
| | | — | Dust II | | | — | |

| 2–2 | June 15 | BetBoom | 2 | – | 0 | FUT | Cologne |
| | 16:30 CET | HLTV | | | | | Palladium |
| | | 13 | Mirage | | | 7 | |
| | | 13 | Dust II | | | 7 | |
| | | — | Overpass | | | — | |

| 2–2 | June 15 | Natus Vincere | 1 | – | 2 | G2 | Cologne |
| | 19:00 CET | HLTV | | | | | Palladium |
| | | 13 | Dust II | | | 11 | |
| | | 14 | Inferno | | | 16 | |
| | | 10 | Mirage | | | 13 | |

== Playoffs stage ==
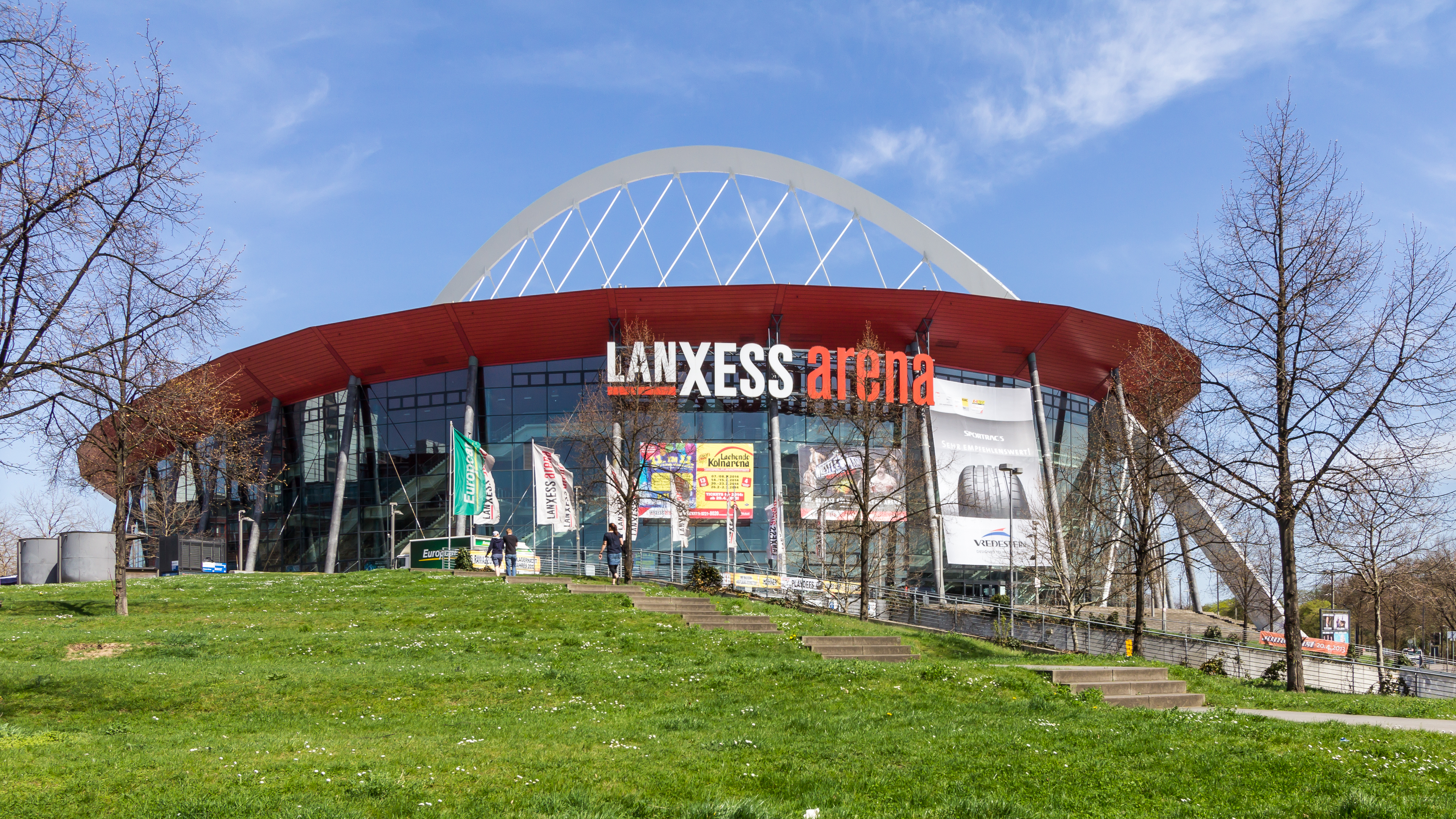
The Lanxess Arena wherein the Playoffs matches were played.

The top eight teams from Stage 3 advanced to a single-elimination bracket. Teams were seeded according to their final Buchholz score earned in Stage 3. Each match in the Playoffs Stage before the grand final is played in a best-of-three format, with the final being a best-of-five.

The Playoffs Stage was played between June 18 and June 21, 2026, at the Lanxess Arena.

Quarterfinals
1 | Spirit | 9 | 16 | 25 | 2
8 | G2 | 13 | 14 | 22 | 1
5 | Falcons | 13 | 11 | 13 | 2
4 | Vitality | 11 | 13 | 11 | 1
3 | Aurora | 13 | 13 | — | 2
6 | BetBoom | 6 | 9 | — | 0
7 | 9z | 13 | 9 | 6 | 1
2 | FURIA | 8 | 13 | 13 | 2

Semifinals
Spirit | 14 | 13 | 12 | 1
Falcons | 16 | 8 | 16 | 2
Aurora | 9 | 4 | — | 0
FURIA | 13 | 13 | — | 2

Finals
Falcons | 13 | 13 | 13 | — | — | 3
FURIA | 8 | 8 | 8 | — | — | 0

=== Results ===
==== Quarterfinals ====
| Quarterfinal 1 | June 18 | Aurora | 2 | – | 0 | BetBoom | Cologne |
| | 15:45 CET | HLTV | | | | | Lanxess Arena |
| | | 13 | Nuke | | | 6 | |
| | | 13 | Anubis | | | 9 | |
| | | — | Dust II | | | — | |

| Quarterfinal 2 | June 18 | 9z | 1 | – | 2 | FURIA | Cologne |
| | 19:00 CET | HLTV | | | | | Lanxess Arena |
| | | 13 | Dust II | | | 8 | |
| | | 9 | Mirage | | | 13 | |
| | | 6 | Overpass | | | 13 | |

| Quarterfinal 3 | June 19 | G2 | 1 | – | 2 | Spirit | Cologne |
| | 15:45 CET | HLTV | | | | | Lanxess Arena |
| | | 13 | Overpass | | | 9 | |
| | | 14 | Dust II | | | 16 | |
| | | 22 | Mirage | | | 25 | |

| Quarterfinal 4 | June 19 | Falcons | 2 | – | 1 | Vitality | Cologne |
| | 19:00 CET | HLTV | | | | | Lanxess Arena |
| | | 13 | Anubis | | | 11 | |
| | | 11 | Inferno | | | 13 | |
| | | 13 | Dust II | | | 11 | |

==== Semifinals ====
| Semifinal 1 | June 20 | Aurora | 0 | – | 2 | FURIA | Cologne |
| | 15:45 CET | HLTV | | | | | Lanxess Arena |
| | | 9 | Dust II | | | 13 | |
| | | 4 | Nuke | | | 13 | |
| | | — | Inferno | | | — | |

| Semifinal 2 | June 20 | Spirit | 1 | – | 2 | Falcons | Cologne |
| | 19:00 CET | HLTV | | | | | Lanxess Arena |
| | | 14 | Anubis | | | 16 | |
| | | 13 | Mirage | | | 8 | |
| | | 12 | Dust II | | | 16 | |

==== Showmatch ====
| Showmatch | June 21 | Team Germany | 1 | – | 0 | Team Poland | Cologne |
| | 14:30 CET | HLTV | | | | | Lanxess Arena |
| | | 13 | Cache | | | 3 | |

==== Final ====
| Grand final | June 21 | Falcons | 3 | – | 0 | FURIA | Cologne |
| | 17:00 CET | HLTV | | | | | Lanxess Arena |
| | | 13 | Mirage | | | 8 | |
| | | 13 | Anubis | | | 8 | |
| | | 13 | Inferno | | | 8 | |
| | | — | Dust II | | | — | |
| | | — | Nuke | | | — | |

== Final standings ==
The final placings are shown below. In addition, the prize distribution, roster, and coaches are shown. An eliminated team's final position is decided by its win-loss record, then by its Buchholz score and finally by its initial seeding in the case of ties.

| Place | Prize Money | Team |
|---|---|---|
| 1st | US$500,000 | Team Falcons |
| 2nd | US$170,000 | FURIA Esports |
| 3rd | US$80,000 | Team Spirit |
| 4th | US$80,000 | Aurora Gaming |
| 5th | US$45,000 | Team Vitality |
| 6th | US$45,000 | BetBoom Team |
| 7th | US$45,000 | 9z Team |
| 8th | US$45,000 | G2 Esports |
| 9th | US$20,000 | Natus Vincere |
| 10th | US$20,000 | FUT Esports |
| 11th | US$20,000 | The MongolZ |
| 12th | US$20,000 | MOUZ |
| 13th | US$20,000 | Monte |
| 14th | US$20,000 | Legacy |
| 15th | US$20,000 | B8 Esports |
| 16th | US$20,000 | PARIVISION |
| 17th | US$10,000 | TYLOO |
| 18th | US$10,000 | BIG Clan |
| 19th | US$10,000 | paiN Gaming |
| 20th | US$10,000 | M80 |
| 21st | US$10,000 | MIBR |
| 22nd | US$10,000 | Astralis |
| 23rd | US$10,000 | FlyQuest |
| 24th | US$10,000 | GamerLegion |
| 25th | —N/a | Team Liquid |
| 26th | —N/a | NRG Esports |
| 27th | —N/a | Lynn Vision Gaming |
| 28th | —N/a | THUNDER dOWNUNDER |
| 29th | —N/a | Sharks Esports |
| 30th | —N/a | HEROIC |
| 31st | —N/a | Gaimin Gladiators |
| 32nd | —N/a | SINNERS Esports |
