= StarLadder Budapest Major 2025 =

Counter-Strike 2 tournament

- 2025

Tournament information
- Game: Counter-Strike 2
- Location: Budapest, Hungary
- Dates: November 24–December 14, 2025
- Administrator: Valve; StarLadder
- Format: Three 16-team Swiss-system group stages 8-team single-elimination playoff
- Host: StarLadder
- Venue: MTK Sportpark (Group stages); MVM Dome (Playoffs stage)
- Teams: 32
- Defending champions: Team Vitality
- Purse: US$1,250,000

Final positions
- Champions: Team Vitality
- 1st runners-up: FaZe Clan
- 2nd runners-up: Team Spirit; Natus Vincere
- MVP: Mathieu "ZywOo" Herbaut

The StarLadder Budapest Major 2025 was the fourth Counter-Strike 2 Major Championship and twenty-third Counter-Strike Major overall. It was held in Budapest, Hungary, from November 24 to December 14, 2025. It was the second Major organized by StarLadder, after Berlin 2019. Each stage of the tournament was held in front of live audiences, with the first three stages being held at MTK Sportpark and the playoffs held at the MVM Dome. The Major was the second to feature 32 teams, with all teams being directly invited to the Major, and was the first Major to have a best-of-five grand final. It featured a prize pool of US$1,250,000.

Team Vitality were crowned champions after a 3–1 victory over FaZe Clan, their third title. Vitality's Mathieu "ZywOo" Herbaut was awarded his third Major MVP, the most of any player.

== Background ==
Counter-Strike 2 is a multiplayer first-person shooter video game developed by Valve Corporation. It is the fifth game in the Counter-Strike series. In professional Counter-Strike, the Valve-sponsored Majors are considered the most prestigious tournaments.

The Major was announced by StarLadder on 12 May 2025, and was their second in six years after last hosting the Berlin 2019 Major.

Team Vitality were the Major's defending champions following a 2–1 victory over The MongolZ at Austin 2025. Vitality ended the tournament as champions, becoming the third organization to win consecutive Majors after Fnatic and Astralis.

== Format ==
The tournament involves three Swiss-system group stages before an eight-team single-elimination playoffs. The Major featured 32 teams directly invited according to their Valve Regional Standings (VRS), following the scrapping of Major Regional Qualifiers. Eight teams are eliminated from each Swiss-system stage before the final eight teams compete in a single-elimination playoff bracket to determine a champion. Each match after the initial matchups of each stage and the initial matchups of the Playoffs Stage are seeded according to teams' Buchholz score.

In the first three stages, all matches except for progression or elimination matches, which are played as bests-of-three, are played in a best-of-one format. Each match in the Playoffs Stage before the grand final is played in a best-of-three format, with the final being a best-of-five.

=== Map pool ===
On July 16, 2025, following the Austin Major, Valve updated the Active Duty maps used for the Majors, replacing Anubis with Overpass.

- Ancient
- Dust II
- Inferno
- Mirage
- Nuke
- Train
- Overpass

== Talent ==
On October 28, 2025, StarLadder announced the full talent lineup for the Major.

=== Hosts ===
- James Banks (arena host)
- Freya Spiers (desk host)
- Sam "Tech Girl" Wright (desk host)

=== Analysts ===
- Jacob "Pimp" Winneche
- Alex "Mauisnake" Ellenberg
- Jonatan "Devilwalk" Lundberg
- Teodor "Tedd" Borisov

=== Casters ===
- Mohan "launders" Govindasamy
- Conner "Scrawny" Girvan
- Chad "SPUNJ" Burchill
- Alex "Machine" Richardson
- Harry "JustHarry" Russell
- Hugo Byron
- Jason "moses" O'Toole
- Adam "Dinko" Hawthorne

== Teams ==
=== Qualification ===
Invites to the Major were distributed to each region according to their performance at Austin 2025, with the number for each region past Stage 1 determined by the number of teams of each region that advanced to the next Stage. The ten highest ranked European teams in the Valve Regional Standings (VRS) were invited to Stages 2 and 3, with five in each, along with two Americas teams and one Asian team in each stage. The distribution of Stage 1 invites remain the same as in Austin.

The final VRS update determining invites was on 6 October 2025, with invites officially being sent on 8 October 2025.

=== Invites ===
Below are the qualified teams for each region, based on their VRS standing as of 6 October 2025.

Region	Qualified Stage		
Region	Stage 1	Stage 2	Stage 3
Europe	FaZe Clan; GamerLegion; Ninjas in Pyjamas; B8 Esports; PARIVISION; fnatic	Aurora Gaming; Natus Vincere; Astralis; 3DMAX; Team Liquid	Team Vitality; Team Spirit; Team Falcons; MOUZ; G2 Esports
Americas	Legacy; Imperial Esports; M80; NRG Esports; Fluxo; RED Canids	MIBR; Passion UA	FURIA Esports; paiN Gaming
Asia	Lynn Vision; The Huns Esports; FlyQuest; Rare Atom	TYLOO	The MongolZ

=== Rosters ===
Below are the rosters for each qualified team.

==== Legends ====
The Legends rosters includes the eight teams directly invited to Stage 3 of the Major.

Legends Team Rosters
Team Name	Core Roster	Coach	Substitute Player
FURIA Esports	Mareks "YEKINDAR" Gaļinskis; Danil "molodoy" Golubenko; Kaike "KSCERATO" Cerato; Yuri "yuurih" Santos; Gabriel "FalleN" Toledo	Sid "sidde" Macedo	—N/a
Team Vitality	Mathieu "ZywOo" Herbaut; Shahar "flameZ" Shushan; Dan "apEX" Madesclaire; Robin "ropz" Kool; William "mezii" Merriman	Rémy "XTQZZZ" Quoniam	—N/a
Team Falcons	Nikola "NiKo" Kovač; René "TeSeS" Madsen; Damjan "kyxsan" Stoilkovski; Maxim "kyousuke" Lukin; Ilya "m0NESY" Osipov	Danny "zonic" Sørensen	Szymon "kRaSnaL" Mrozek
The MongolZ	Garidmagnai "bLitz" Byambasuren; Ayush "mzinho" Batbold; Sodbayar "Techno4K" Munkhbold; Usukhbayar "910" Banzragch; ~~Azbayar "Senzu" Munkhbold~~	Erdenedalai "maaRaa" Bayanbat	Unudelger "controlez" Baasanjargal (replaced Senzu)
MOUZ	Jimi "Jimpphat" Salo; Ádám "torzsi" Torzsás; Ludvig "Brollan" Brolin; Dorian "xertioN" Berman; Lotan "Spinx" Giladi	Dennis "sycrone" Nielsen	Adrian "xelex" Vincze
Team Spirit	Leonid "chopper" Vishnyakov; Dmitry "sh1ro" Sokolov; Danil "donk" Kryshkovets; ~~Myroslav "zont1x" Plakhotia~~; Ivan "zweih" Gogin	Sergey "hally" Shavaev	Andrey "tN1R" Tatarinovich (replaced zont1x)
G2 Esports	Nemanja "huNter-" Kovač; Álvaro "SunPayus" García; Nikita "HeavyGod" Martynenko; Matúš "MATYS" Šimko; Mario "malbsMd" Samayoa	Eetu "sAw" Saha	Vilius "tAk" Keserauskas
paiN Gaming	Rodrigo "biguzera" Bittencourt; David "dav1deuS" Tapia Maldonado; Lucas "nqz" Soares; Franco "dgt" Garcia; João "snow" Vinicius	Henrique "rikz" Waku	—N/a

==== Challengers ====
The Challengers rosters includes the eight teams directly invited to Stage 2 of the Major.

Challengers Team Rosters
Team Name	Core Roster	Coach	Substitute Player
Aurora Gaming	Ismailcan "XANTARES" Dörtkardeş; Engin "MAJ3R" Küpeli; Samet "jottAAA" Köklü; Özgür "woxic" Eker; Ali "Wicadia" Haydar Yalçın	Sezgin "Fabre" Kalaycı	—N/a
Natus Vincere	Ihor "w0nderful" Zhdanov; Mihai "iM" Ivan; Aleksi "Aleksib" Virolainen; Drin "makazze" Shaqiri; Valeriy "b1t" Vakhovskiy	Andrey "B1ad3" Gorodenskiy	Justinas "jL" Lekavicius
Team Liquid	Jonathan "EliGE" Jablonowski; Kamil "siuhy" Szkaradek; Roland "ultimate" Tomkowiak; Keith "NAF" Markovic; Guy "NertZ" Iluz	Viktor "flashie" Tamás Bea	—N/a
3DMAX	Pierre "Ex3rcice" Bulinge; Lucas "Lucky" Chastang; Alexandre "bodyy" Pianaro; Filip "Graviti" Brankovic; Bryan "Maka" Canda	Pierre "YouKnow" Marco	Nabil "Nivera" Benrlitom
Astralis	Rasmus "HooXi" Nielsen; Jakob "jabbi" Nygaard; Nicolai "device" Reedtz; Victor "Staehr" Staehr; Emil "Magisk" Reif	Casper "ruggah" Due	—N/a
TYLOO	Jingxiang "Mercury" Wang; Qianhao "Moseyuh" Chen; Dongkai "Jee" Ji; Yuanzhang "Attacker" Sheng; Yi "JamYoung" Yang	Weijie "zhokiNg" Zhong	—N/a
MIBR	Raphael "exit" Lacerda; Aleksei "Qikert" Golubev; Felipe "insani" Yuji; Klimentii "kl1m" Krivosheev; Breno "brnz4n" Poletto	Jhonatan "jnt" Silva	Bruno "brn$" de Araújo
Passion UA	Johnny "JT" Theodosiou; Vladyslav "Kvem" Korol; Håkon "hallzerk" Fjærli; Michael "Grim" Wince; Nick "nicx" Lee	Tiaan "T.c" Coertzen	—N/a

==== Contenders ====
The Contenders rosters includes the sixteen teams directly invited to Stage 1 of the Major.

Contenders Team Rosters
Team Name	Core Roster	Coach	Substitute Player
Legacy	Lucas "lux" Meneghini; Guilherme "saadzin" Pacheco; Bruno "latto" Rebelatto; Vinicius "n1ssim" Pereira; Eduardo "dumau" Wolkmer	Olavo "chucky" Napoleão	—N/a
FaZe Clan	Finn "karrigan" Andersen; Jakub "jcobbb" Pietruszewski; Helvijs "broky" Saukants; David "frozen" Čerňanský; ~~Håvard "rain" Nygaard~~	Filip "NEO" Kubski	Russel "Twistzz" Van Dulken (replaced rain)
B8 Esports	Daniil "headtr1ck" Valitov; Alexey "alex666" Yarmoshchuk; Andrii "npl" Kukharskyi; Artem "kensizor" Kapran; Dmytro "esenthial" Tsvir	Ivan "maddened" Iordanidi	Volodymyr "k1n" Kozovyk
GamerLegion	~~Jeremy "Kursy" Gast~~; Oldřich "PR" Nový; Fredrik "REZ" Sterner; Erik "ztr" Gustafsson; Sebastian "Tauson" Tauson Lindelof	Ashley "ash" Battye	Milan "hypex" Polowiec (replaced Kursy)
fnatic	Freddy "KRIMZ" Johansson; Benjamin "blameF" Bremer; Rodion "fEAR" Smyk; Dmytro "jambo" Semera; ~~Cai "CYPHER" Watson~~	Miks "Independent" Siliņš	Nikita "jackasmo" Skyba (replaced CYPHER)
PARIVISION	Dzhami "Jame" Ali; Andrey "BELCHONOKK" Yasinskiy; Emil "nota" Moskvitin; Andrey "AW" Anisimov; Vladislav "xiELO" Lysov	Dastan "dastan" Akbayev	—N/a
Ninjas in Pyjamas	Marco "Snappi" Pfeiffer; Kacper "xKacpersky" Gabara; Artem "r1nkle" Moroz; Rasmus "sjuush" Beck; Michel "ewjerkz" Pinto	Richard "Xizt" Landström	Pavle "Maden" Bošković
Imperial Esports	Vinicius "VINI" Figueiredo; Santino "try" Rigal; Kaiky "noway" Santos; Felipe "skullz" Medeiros; Marcelo "chelo" Cespedes	Rafael "zakk" Fernandes	—N/a
FlyQuest	Joshua "INS" Potter; Iulian "regali" Harjău; Justin "jks" Savage; Corey "nettik" Browne; Declan "Vexite" Portelli	Aaron "AZR" Ward	—N/a
Lynn Vision	Zhe "Westmelon" Niu; Junjie "EmiliaQAQ" Tang; Sike "z4kr" Zhang; Qihao "C4LLM3SU3" Su; Lizhi "Starry" Ye	Yifei "GUM" Dai	—N/a
M80	Michael "Swisher" Schmid; Elias "s1n" Stein; Mason "Lake" Sanderson; Fritz "slaxz-" Dietrich; Jadan "HexT" Postma	Rory "dephh" Jackson	Frank "M0nstr" Vopat
Fluxo	Andrei "arT" Piovezan; Lucas "Lucaozy" Neves; Romeu "zevy" Rocco; Kayke "kye" Bertolucci; Lucas "decenty" Bacelar	Marcos "tacitus" Castilho	Matheus "mlhzin" Marçola
RED Canids	André "drop" Abreu; Allan "history" Lawrenz; Carlos "venomzera" Eduardo; Richard "chayJESUS" Seidy; Kaue "kauez" Kaschuk	Gustavo "tge" Motta	—N/a
The Huns Esports	Tengis "sk0R" Batjargal; Anarbileg "cobrazera" Uuganbayar; Yesuntumur "nin9" Gantulga; Munkhtogtokh "xerolte" Enkhbat; Baatarkhuu "Bart4k" Batbold	Badral "Carnage" Purevkhuu	"Timothy"
NRG Esports	Zack "XotiC" Elshani; Aran "Sonic" Groesbeek; Alexander "br0" Bro; ~~Nick "nitr0" Cannella~~; Jeorge "Jeorge" Endicott	Damian "daps" Steele (replaced nitr0)	—N/a
Rare Atom	Tzu-Chi "Marek" Huang; Yihang "L1haNg" Li; Yulun "Summer" Cai; Junbing "Tiger" Zhen; Junhao "ChildKing" Peng	Zhenghui "z8z" Liu	Shengxuan "chengking" Zu

== Stage 1 ==
Stage 1 featured sixteen directly invited teams based on their global Valve Regional Standings, competing in a Swiss-system bracket. Teams were initially seeded according to their Valve Regional Standing, with further matches seeded according to a team's Buchholz score. Sixteen teams competed for eight Stage 2 spots, with all matches besides elimination and progression matches, which are bests-of-three, being bests-of-one.

Stage 1 was played from November 24 to November 27, 2025.

Pos	Team	W	L	RW	RL	RD	BS	Qualification
1	M80	3	0	52	29	+23	2	Qualification to Stage 2
2	FlyQuest	3	0	52	20	+32	-1	Qualification to Stage 2
3	B8	3	1	66	52	+14	1	Qualification to Stage 2
4	fnatic	3	1	67	62	+5	-3	Qualification to Stage 2
5	Ninjas in Pyjamas	3	1	59	33	+26	-4	Qualification to Stage 2
6	PARIVISION	3	2	102	98	+4	0	Qualification to Stage 2
7	Imperial	3	2	77	70	+7	-1	Qualification to Stage 2
8	FaZe	3	2	103	95	+8	-5	Qualification to Stage 2
9	NRG	2	3	80	98	-18	9	Eliminated
10	Fluxo	2	3	69	104	-35	6	Eliminated
11	Legacy	2	3	91	91	+0	1	Eliminated
12	The Huns	1	3	65	70	-5	1	Eliminated
13	RED Canids	1	3	68	74	-6	0	Eliminated
14	GamerLegion	1	3	68	70	-2	-5	Eliminated
15	Lynn Vision	0	3	22	52	-30	1	Eliminated
16	Rare Atom	0	3	29	52	-23	-2	Eliminated

Updated to match(es) played on November 27, 2025. Source:

=== Results ===
==== Round 1 ====
0–0	November 24	B8	11	–	13	M80	Budapest
	13:00 CET	HLTV					MTK Sportpark
		11	Mirage			13	

0–0	November 24	Imperial	13	–	11	Rare Atom	Budapest
	13:00 CET	HLTV					MTK Sportpark
		13	Dust II			11	

0–0	November 24	Legacy	10	–	13	FlyQuest	Budapest
	14:00 CET	HLTV					MTK Sportpark
		10	Train			13	

0–0	November 24	PARIVISION	13	–	8	The Huns	Budapest
	14:00 CET	HLTV					MTK Sportpark
		13	Mirage			8	

0–0	November 24	Ninjas in Pyjamas	7	–	13	NRG	Budapest
	15:00 CET	HLTV					MTK Sportpark
		7	Overpass			13	

0–0	November 24	GamerLegion	10	–	13	Fluxo	Budapest
	15:00 CET	HLTV					MTK Sportpark
		10	Nuke			13	

0–0	November 24	FaZe	13	–	5	Lynn Vision	Budapest
	16:00 CET	HLTV					MTK Sportpark
		13	Nuke			5	

0–0	November 24	fnatic	16	–	14	RED Canids	Budapest
	17:30 CET	HLTV					MTK Sportpark
		16	Ancient			14	

==== Round 2 ====
1–0	November 24	Imperial	6	–	13	FlyQuest	Budapest
	20:00 CET	HLTV					MTK Sportpark
		6	Inferno			13	

1–0	November 24	PARIVISION	9	–	13	M80	Budapest
	21:30 CET	HLTV					MTK Sportpark
		9	Mirage			13	

1–0	November 24	fnatic	9	–	13	Fluxo	Budapest
	23:30 CET	HLTV					MTK Sportpark
		9	Train			13	

1–0	November 25	FaZe	10	–	13	NRG	Budapest
	00:30 CET	HLTV					MTK Sportpark
		10	Dust II			13	

0–1	November 24	Legacy	13	–	6	Rare Atom	Budapest
	20:00 CET	HLTV					MTK Sportpark
		13	Dust II			6	

0–1	November 24	B8	13	–	11	The Huns	Budapest
	21:00 CET	HLTV					MTK Sportpark
		13	Dust II			11	

0–1	November 24	GamerLegion	6	–	13	RED Canids	Budapest
	22:00 CET	HLTV					MTK Sportpark
		6	Train			13	

0–1	November 24	Ninjas in Pyjamas	13	–	2	Lynn Vision	Budapest
	23:00 CET	HLTV					MTK Sportpark
		13	Train			2	

==== Round 3 ====
2–0	November 25	FlyQuest	2	–	0	Fluxo	Budapest
	17:20 CET	HLTV					MTK Sportpark
		13	Overpass			1	
		13	Inferno			3	
		—	Train			—	

2–0	November 25	M80	2	–	0	NRG	Budapest
	19:05 CET	HLTV					MTK Sportpark
		13	Dust II			7	
		13	Mirage			2	
		—	Train			—	

1–1	November 25	Legacy	13	–	6	RED Canids	Budapest
	15:00 CET	HLTV					MTK Sportpark
		13	Nuke			6	

1–1	November 25	B8	13	–	11	PARIVISION	Budapest
	15:00 CET	HLTV					MTK Sportpark
		13	Inferno			11	

1–1	November 25	FaZe	8	–	13	Ninjas in Pyjamas	Budapest
	16:10 CET	HLTV					MTK Sportpark
		8	Overpass			13	

1–1	November 25	fnatic	13	–	3	Imperial	Budapest
	16:10 CET	HLTV					MTK Sportpark
		13	Train			3	

0–2	November 25	GamerLegion	2	–	0	Rare Atom	Budapest
	17:05 CET	HLTV					MTK Sportpark
		13	Inferno			7	
		13	Overpass			5	
		—	Ancient			—	

0–2	November 25	The Huns	2	–	0	Lynn Vision	Budapest
	19:30 CET	HLTV					MTK Sportpark
		13	Ancient			7	
		13	Dust II			8	
		—	Nuke			—	

==== Round 4 ====
2–1	November 26	Fluxo	0	–	2	Ninjas in Pyjamas	Budapest
	15:00 CET	HLTV					MTK Sportpark
		5	Nuke			13	
		5	Train			13	
		—	Overpass			—	

2–1	November 26	B8	2	–	0	Legacy	Budapest
	15:00 CET	HLTV					MTK Sportpark
		13	Dust II			12	
		13	Mirage			5	
		—	Ancient			—	

2–1	November 26	NRG	1	–	2	fnatic	Budapest
	17:15 CET	HLTV					MTK Sportpark
		13	Mirage			3	
		10	Inferno			13	
		9	Dust II			13	

1–2	November 26	RED Canids	1	–	2	FaZe	Budapest
	17:00 CET	HLTV					MTK Sportpark
		13	Mirage			7	
		17	Nuke			19	
		5	Inferno			13	

1–2	November 26	PARIVISION	2	–	0	GamerLegion	Budapest
	20:30 CET	HLTV					MTK Sportpark
		16	Overpass			14	
		16	Ancient			12	
		—	Dust II			—	

1–2	November 26	Imperial	2	–	0	The Huns	Budapest
	20:20 CET	HLTV					MTK Sportpark
		13	Nuke			8	
		13	Mirage			12	
		—	Dust II			—	

==== Round 5 ====
2–2	November 27	Fluxo	1	–	2	FaZe	Budapest
	15:00 CET	HLTV					MTK Sportpark
		6	Inferno			13	
		13	Nuke			7	
		10	Mirage			13	

2–2	November 27	NRG	0	–	2	Imperial	Budapest
	18:05 CET	HLTV					MTK Sportpark
		8	Nuke			13	
		5	Train			13	
		—	Dust II			—	

2–2	November 27	PARIVISION	2	–	1	Legacy	Budapest
	20:15 CET	HLTV					MTK Sportpark
		13	Ancient			9	
		5	Inferno			13	
		19	Dust II			16	

== Stage 2 ==
Stage 2 featured eight directly invited teams based on their Valve Regional Standings as well as eight teams qualified from Stage 1, competing in a Swiss-system bracket. Invited teams were initially seeded according to their global Valve Regional Standing, while the eight teams qualified from Stage 2 were seeded according to their final Buchholz score, with further matches seeded according to a team's Buchholz score in Stage 2. Sixteen teams competed for eight Stage 3 spots, with all matches besides elimination and progression matches, which are bests-of-three, being bests-of-one.

Stage 2 was played from November 29 to December 2, 2025.

Pos	Team	W	L	RW	RL	RD	BS	Qualification
1	Natus Vincere	3	0	52	26	+26	1	Qualification to Stage 3
2	FaZe	3	0	58	44	+14	-2	Qualification to Stage 3
3	B8	3	1	69	74	-5	3	Qualification to Stage 3
4	Imperial	3	1	64	63	+1	-3	Qualification to Stage 3
5	PARIVISION	3	1	66	55	+11	-4	Qualification to Stage 3
6	Liquid	3	2	106	96	+10	-2	Qualification to Stage 3
7	Passion UA	3	2	89	79	+10	-2	Qualification to Stage 3
8	3DMAX	3	2	88	63	+25	-3	Qualification to Stage 3
9	Ninjas in Pyjamas	2	3	89	111	-22	3	Eliminated
10	M80	2	3	92	99	-7	-2	Eliminated
11	Astralis	2	3	100	100	+0	-6	Eliminated
12	fnatic	1	3	52	58	-6	6	Eliminated
13	Aurora	1	3	66	69	-3	3	Eliminated
14	TYLOO	1	3	63	69	-6	1	Eliminated
15	MIBR	0	3	37	58	-21	4	Eliminated
16	FlyQuest	0	3	25	52	-27	3	Eliminated

Updated to match(es) played on December 2, 2025. Source:

=== Results ===
==== Round 1 ====
0–0	November 29	Astralis	10	–	13	Ninjas in Pyjamas	Budapest
	13:00 CET	HLTV					MTK Sportpark
		10	Nuke			13	

0–0	November 29	3DMAX	6	–	13	fnatic	Budapest
	13:00 CET	HLTV					MTK Sportpark
		6	Inferno			13	

0–0	November 29	Passion UA	10	–	13	FaZe	Budapest
	14:00 CET	HLTV					MTK Sportpark
		10	Dust II			13	

0–0	November 29	PARIVISION	5	–	13	TYLOO	Budapest
	14:00 CET	HLTV					MTK Sportpark
		5	Mirage			13	

0–0	November 29	Natus Vincere	13	–	2	FlyQuest	Budapest
	15:00 CET	HLTV					MTK Sportpark
		13	Train			2	

0–0	November 29	Aurora	13	–	6	M80	Budapest
	15:00 CET	HLTV					MTK Sportpark
		13	Dust II			6	

0–0	November 29	MIBR	5	–	13	Imperial	Budapest
	16:00 CET	HLTV					MTK Sportpark
		5	Nuke			13	

0–0	November 29	Liquid	7	–	13	B8	Budapest
	16:00 CET	HLTV					MTK Sportpark
		7	Mirage			13	

==== Round 2 ====
1–0	November 29	Ninjas in Pyjamas	13	–	8	TYLOO	Budapest
	18:00 CET	HLTV					MTK Sportpark
		13	Nuke			8	

1–0	November 29	Natus Vincere	13	–	10	Imperial	Budapest
	19:05 CET	HLTV					MTK Sportpark
		13	Mirage			10	

1–0	November 29	Aurora	10	–	13	FaZe	Budapest
	20:15 CET	HLTV					MTK Sportpark
		10	Dust II			13	

1–0	November 29	fnatic	11	–	13	B8	Budapest
	21:25 CET	HLTV					MTK Sportpark
		11	Ancient			13	

0–1	November 29	FlyQuest	7	–	13	3DMAX	Budapest
	18:05 CET	HLTV					MTK Sportpark
		7	Inferno			13	

0–1	November 29	M80	13	–	11	Astralis	Budapest
	19:10 CET	HLTV					MTK Sportpark
		13	Ancient			11	

0–1	November 29	Passion UA	13	–	10	MIBR	Budapest
	20:20 CET	HLTV					MTK Sportpark
		13	Mirage			10	

0–1	November 29	PARIVISION	13	–	3	Liquid	Budapest
	21:00 CET	HLTV					MTK Sportpark
		13	Dust II			3	

==== Round 3 ====
2–0	November 30	FaZe	2	–	0	Ninjas in Pyjamas	Budapest
	17:00 CET	HLTV					MTK Sportpark
		16	Inferno			12	
		16	Nuke			12	
		—	Ancient			—	

2–0	November 30	Natus Vincere	2	–	0	B8	Budapest
	19:30 CET	HLTV					MTK Sportpark
		13	Train			6	
		13	Mirage			8	
		—	Ancient			—	

1–1	November 30	Passion UA	3	–	13	3DMAX	Budapest
	15:00 CET	HLTV					MTK Sportpark
		3	Train			13	

1–1	November 30	M80	13	–	10	TYLOO	Budapest
	15:00 CET	HLTV					MTK Sportpark
		13	Train			10	

1–1	November 30	PARIVISION	13	–	11	Aurora	Budapest
	16:00 CET	HLTV					MTK Sportpark
		13	Overpass			11	

1–1	November 30	fnatic	10	–	13	Imperial	Budapest
	16:00 CET	HLTV					MTK Sportpark
		10	Dust II			13	

0–2	November 30	MIBR	0	–	2	Liquid	Budapest
	17:00 CET	HLTV					MTK Sportpark
		5	Inferno			13	
		17	Mirage			19	
		—	Ancient			—	

0–2	November 30	FlyQuest	0	–	2	Astralis	Budapest
	19:30 CET	HLTV					MTK Sportpark
		5	Mirage			13	
		11	Overpass			13	
		—	Inferno			—	

==== Round 4 ====
2–1	December 1	PARIVISION	2	–	0	Ninjas in Pyjamas	Budapest
	15:15 CET	HLTV					MTK Sportpark
		19	Dust II			16	
		16	Train			12	
		—	Overpass			—	

2–1	December 1	Imperial	2	–	1	M80	Budapest
	18:20 CET	HLTV					MTK Sportpark
		13	Mirage			11	
		2	Dust II			13	
		13	Train			11	

2–1	December 1	B8	2	–	1	3DMAX	Budapest
	21:40 CET	HLTV					MTK Sportpark
		3	Train			13	
		13	Ancient			9	
		13	Dust II			8	

1–2	December 1	fnatic	0	–	2	Passion UA	Budapest
	15:00 CET	HLTV					MTK Sportpark
		11	Overpass			13	
		7	Inferno			13	
		—	Mirage			—	

1–2	December 1	Aurora	1	–	2	Astralis	Budapest
	17:20 CET	HLTV					MTK Sportpark
		13	Nuke			11	
		8	Train			13	
		11	Mirage			13	

1–2	December 1	Liquid	2	–	1	TYLOO	Budapest
	20:55 CET	HLTV					MTK Sportpark
		9	Ancient			13	
		13	Train			5	
		16	Inferno			14	

==== Round 5 ====
2–2	December 2	Passion UA	2	–	1	M80	Budapest
	15:00 CET	HLTV					MTK Sportpark
		11	Mirage			13	
		13	Inferno			5	
		13	Train			7	

2–2	December 2	Liquid	2	–	0	Astralis	Budapest
	17:10 CET	HLTV					MTK Sportpark
		13	Nuke			7	
		13	Mirage			9	
		—	Inferno			—	

2–2	December 2	Ninjas in Pyjamas	0	–	2	3DMAX	Budapest
	20:00 CET	HLTV					MTK Sportpark
		3	Ancient			13	
		8	Train			13	
		—	Nuke			—	

== Stage 3 ==
Stage 3 featured eight directly invited teams based on their Valve Regional Standings as well as eight teams qualified from Stage 2, competing in a Swiss-system bracket. Invited teams were initially seeded according to their global Valve Regional Standing, while the eight teams qualified from Stage 2 were seeded according to their final Buchholz score, with further matches seeded according to a team's Buchholz score in Stage 3. Sixteen teams competed for eight Playoffs Stage spots, with all matches besides elimination and progression matches, which are bests-of-three, being bests-of-one.

Stage 3 was played from December 4 to December 7, 2025.

Pos	Team	W	L	RW	RL	RD	BS	Qualification
1	Spirit	3	0	62	42	+20	0	Qualification to Playoffs Stage
2	FURIA	3	0	52	23	+29	-2	Qualification to Playoffs Stage
3	MOUZ	3	1	95	85	+10	0	Qualification to Playoffs Stage
4	Vitality	3	1	59	41	+18	-1	Qualification to Playoffs Stage
5	The MongolZ	3	1	66	42	+24	-5	Qualification to Playoffs Stage
6	FaZe	3	2	77	66	+17	4	Qualification to Playoffs Stage
7	Natus Vincere	3	2	79	71	+8	-1	Qualification to Playoffs Stage
8	Falcons	3	2	100	83	+17	-3	Qualification to Playoffs Stage
9	B8	2	3	74	93	-19	4	Eliminated
10	G2	2	3	79	102	-23	3	Eliminated
11	Passion UA	2	3	65	65	+0	-4	Eliminated
12	Imperial	1	3	40	66	-26	5	Eliminated
13	3DMAX	1	3	63	84	-21	-2	Eliminated
14	paiN	1	3	56	71	-15	-3	Eliminated
15	Liquid	0	3	38	52	-14	4	Eliminated
16	PARIVISION	0	3	52	67	-15	1	Eliminated

Updated to match(es) played on December 7, 2025. Source:

=== Results ===
==== Round 1 ====
0–0	December 4	MOUZ	16	–	14	PARIVISION	Budapest
	13:00 CET	HLTV					MTK Sportpark
		16	Overpass			14	

0–0	December 4	Imperial	16	–	14	The MongolZ	Budapest
	13:00 CET	HLTV					MTK Sportpark
		16	Dust II			14	

0–0	December 4	Spirit	13	–	8	Liquid	Budapest
	14:35 CET	HLTV					MTK Sportpark
		13	Train			8	

0–0	December 4	Passion UA	8	–	13	G2	Budapest
	14:30 CET	HLTV					MTK Sportpark
		8	Mirage			13	

0–0	December 4	Vitality	7	–	13	FaZe	Budapest
	15:50 CET	HLTV					MTK Sportpark
		7	Nuke			13	

0–0	December 4	paiN	13	–	10	3DMAX	Budapest
	15:35 CET	HLTV					MTK Sportpark
		13	Nuke			10	

0–0	December 4	FURIA	13	–	2	Natus Vincere	Budapest
	17:00 CET	HLTV					MTK Sportpark
		13	Nuke			2	

0–0	December 4	B8	13	–	10	Falcons	Budapest
	16:40 CET	HLTV					MTK Sportpark
		13	Ancient			10	

==== Round 2 ====
1–0	December 4	paiN	7	–	13	G2	Budapest
	18:40 CET	HLTV					MTK Sportpark
		7	Dust II			13	

1–0	December 4	FaZe	5	–	13	Spirit	Budapest
	19:50 CET	HLTV					MTK Sportpark
		5	Dust II			13	

1–0	December 4	MOUZ	13	–	6	B8	Budapest
	20:50 CET	HLTV					MTK Sportpark
		13	Overpass			6	

1–0	December 4	FURIA	13	–	5	Imperial	Budapest
	22:00 CET	HLTV					MTK Sportpark
		13	Dust II			5	

0–1	December 4	3DMAX	4	–	13	Vitality	Budapest
	19:00 CET	HLTV					MTK Sportpark
		4	Nuke			13	

0–1	December 4	Passion UA	5	–	13	Falcons	Budapest
	19:50 CET	HLTV					MTK Sportpark
		5	Nuke			13	

0–1	December 4	Liquid	9	–	13	The MongolZ	Budapest
	20:50 CET	HLTV					MTK Sportpark
		9	Inferno			13	

0–1	December 4	PARIVISION	6	–	13	Natus Vincere	Budapest
	22:00 CET	HLTV					MTK Sportpark
		6	Ancient			13	

==== Round 3 ====
2–0	December 5	MOUZ	1	–	2	Spirit	Budapest
	17:15 CET	HLTV					MTK Sportpark
		5	Mirage			13	
		13	Train			10	
		11	Overpass			13	

2–0	December 5	FURIA	2	–	0	G2	Budapest
	20:50 CET	HLTV					MTK Sportpark
		13	Inferno			6	
		13	Overpass			10	
		—	Dust II			—	

1–1	December 5	FaZe	7	–	13	The MongolZ	Budapest
	15:00 CET	HLTV					MTK Sportpark
		7	Mirage			13	

1–1	December 5	B8	2	–	13	Vitality	Budapest
	15:00 CET	HLTV					MTK Sportpark
		2	Inferno			13	

1–1	December 5	paiN	8	–	13	Natus Vincere	Budapest
	16:00 CET	HLTV					MTK Sportpark
		8	Dust II			13	

1–1	December 5	Imperial	1	–	13	Falcons	Budapest
	15:55 CET	HLTV					MTK Sportpark
		1	Mirage			13	

0–2	December 5	Passion UA	2	–	0	Liquid	Budapest
	16:55 CET	HLTV					MTK Sportpark
		13	Train			11	
		13	Mirage			10	
		—	Nuke			—	

0–2	December 5	PARIVISION	1	–	2	3DMAX	Budapest
	19:05 CET	HLTV					MTK Sportpark
		16	Dust II			12	
		8	Inferno			13	
		8	Ancient			13	

==== Round 4 ====
2–1	December 6	Natus Vincere	0	–	2	Vitality	Budapest
	15:00 CET	HLTV					MTK Sportpark
		11	Inferno			13	
		11	Train			13	
		—	Dust II			—	

2–1	December 6	MOUZ	2	–	1	Falcons	Budapest
	17:35 CET	HLTV					MTK Sportpark
		11	Mirage			13	
		13	Inferno			6	
		13	Nuke			10	

2–1	December 6	G2	0	–	2	The MongolZ	Budapest
	21:05 CET	HLTV					MTK Sportpark
		4	Ancient			13	
		6	Dust II			13	
		—	Inferno			—	

1–2	December 6	B8	2	–	0	paiN	Budapest
	15:00 CET	HLTV					MTK Sportpark
		19	Dust II			16	
		16	Ancient			12	
		—	Inferno			—	

1–2	December 6	Passion UA	2	–	0	Imperial	Budapest
	17:55 CET	HLTV					MTK Sportpark
		13	Inferno			8	
		13	Dust II			10	
		—	Overpass			—	

1–2	December 6	3DMAX	0	–	2	FaZe	Budapest
	20:15 CET	HLTV					MTK Sportpark
		6	Dust II			13	
		5	Inferno			13	
		—	Nuke			—	

==== Round 5 ====
2–2	December 7	B8	0	–	2	Natus Vincere	Budapest
	15:00 CET	HLTV					MTK Sportpark
		4	Ancient			13	
		14	Train			16	
		—	Mirage			—	

2–2	December 7	FaZe	2	–	0	Passion UA	Budapest
	17:30 CET	HLTV					MTK Sportpark
		13	Overpass			11	
		13	Mirage			11	
		—	Dust II			—	

2–2	December 7	G2	1	–	2	Falcons	Budapest
	20:00 CET	HLTV					MTK Sportpark
		13	Ancient			9	
		4	Inferno			13	
		10	Dust II			13	

== Playoffs stage ==
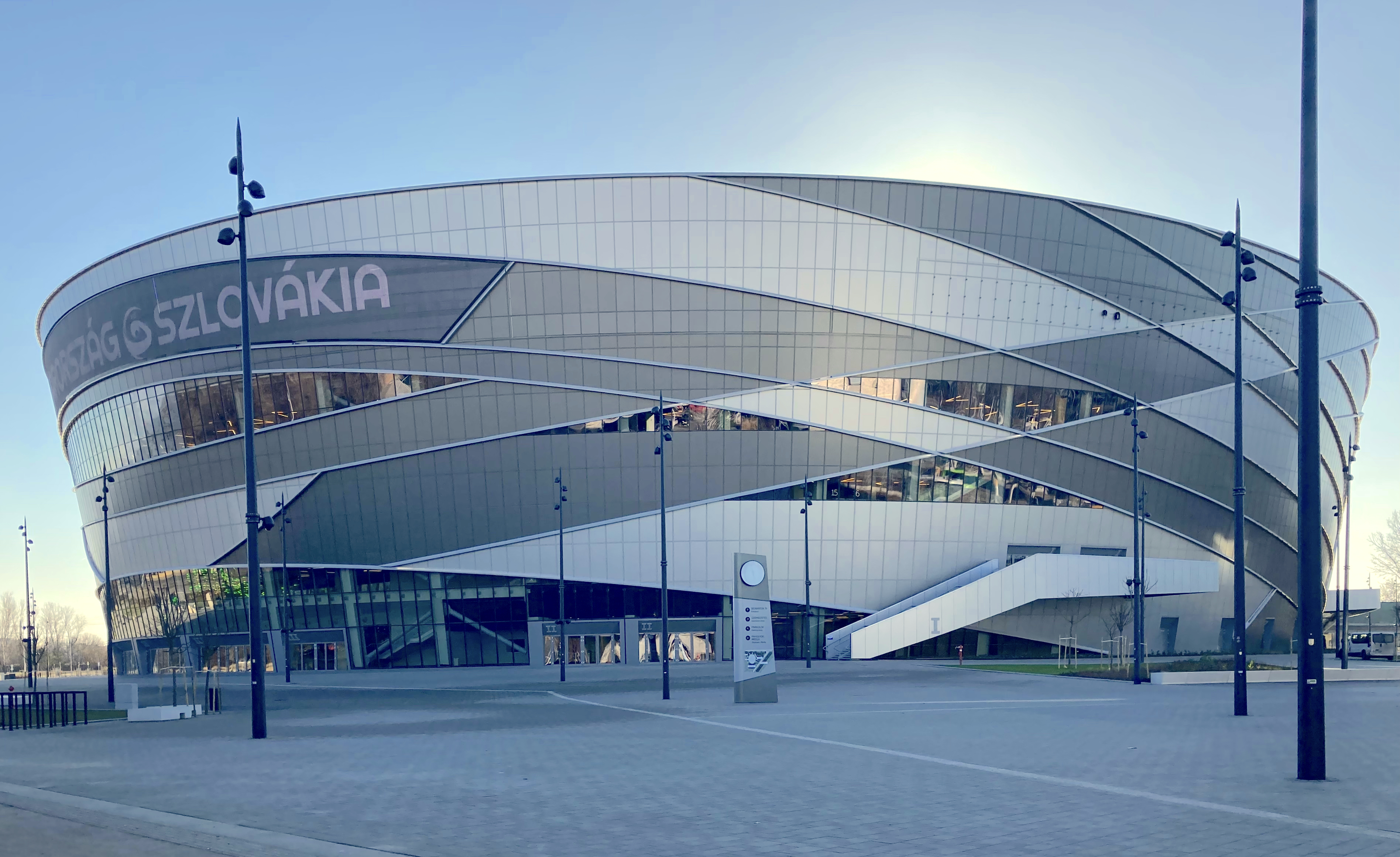
The playoffs were held at the MVM Dome in Budapest.

The top eight teams from Stage 3 advanced to a single-elimination bracket. Teams were seeded according to their final Buchholz score earned in Stage 3. Each match in the Playoffs Stage before the grand final is played in a best-of-three format, with the final being a best-of-five.

The Playoffs Stage was played between December 11 and December 14, 2025, at the MVM Dome.

Quarterfinals
1	Spirit	13	16	—	2
8	Falcons	4	12	—	0
5	The MongolZ	5	4	—	0
4	Vitality	13	13	—	2
3	MOUZ	11	2	—	0
6	FaZe	13	13	—	2
7	Natus Vincere	13	13	13	2
2	FURIA	5	16	3	1

Semifinals
Spirit	17	8	—	0
Vitality	19	13	—	2
FaZe	5	13	13	2
Natus Vincere	13	11	8	1

Finals
Vitality	6	13	13	13	—	3
FaZe	13	3	9	2	—	1

=== Results ===
==== Quarterfinals ====
Quarterfinal 1	December 11	Spirit	2	–	0	Falcons	Budapest
	17:00 CET	HLTV					MVM Dome
		13	Nuke			4	
		16	Dust II			12	
		—	Ancient			—	

Quarterfinal 2	December 11	Vitality	2	–	0	The MongolZ	Budapest
	20:10 CET	HLTV					MVM Dome
		13	Mirage			5	
		13	Dust II			4	
		—	Nuke			—	

Quarterfinal 3	December 12	MOUZ	0	–	2	FaZe	Budapest
	17:00 CET	HLTV					MVM Dome
		11	Nuke			13	
		2	Inferno			13	
		—	Mirage			—	

Quarterfinal 4	December 12	FURIA	1	–	2	Natus Vincere	Budapest
	21:00 CET	HLTV					MVM Dome
		5	Mirage			13	
		16	Inferno			13	
		3	Train			13	

==== Semifinals ====
Semifinal 1	December 13	Vitality	2	–	0	Spirit	Budapest
	17:00 CET	HLTV					MVM Dome
		19	Mirage			17	
		13	Dust II			8	
		—	Overpass			—	

Semifinal 2	December 13	FaZe	2	–	1	Natus Vincere	Budapest
	21:00 CET	HLTV					MVM Dome
		5	Ancient			13	
		13	Nuke			11	
		13	Inferno			8	

==== Showmatch ====
Showmatch	December 14	Team VACO	0	–	1	Team GOAT	Budapest
	16:00 CET	HLTV					MVM Dome
		8	Contact			13	

==== Final ====
Grand final	December 14	Vitality	3	–	1	FaZe	Budapest
	18:00 CET	HLTV					MVM Dome
		6	Nuke			13	
		13	Dust II			3	
		13	Inferno			9	
		13	Overpass			2	
		—	Mirage			—	

== Final standings ==
The final placings are shown below. In addition, the prize distribution, roster, and coaches are shown. An eliminated team's final position is decided by its win-loss record, then by its Buchholz score and finally by its initial seeding in the case of ties.

Place	Prize Money	Team
1st	US$500,000	Team Vitality
2nd	US$170,000	FaZe Clan
3rd	US$80,000	Team Spirit
4th	US$80,000	Natus Vincere
5th	US$45,000	FURIA Esports
6th	US$45,000	MOUZ
7th	US$45,000	The MongolZ
8th	US$45,000	Team Falcons
9th	US$15,000	B8 Esports
10th	US$15,000	G2 Esports
11th	US$15,000	Passion UA
12th	US$15,000	Imperial Esports
13th	US$15,000	3DMAX
14th	US$15,000	paiN Gaming
15th	US$15,000	Team Liquid
16th	US$15,000	PARIVISION
17th	US$10,000	Ninjas in Pyjamas
18th	US$10,000	M80
19th	US$10,000	Astralis
20th	US$10,000	fnatic
21st	US$10,000	Aurora Gaming
22nd	US$10,000	TYLOO
23rd	US$10,000	MIBR
24th	US$10,000	FlyQuest
25th	US$5,000	NRG Esports
26th	US$5,000	Fluxo
27th	US$5,000	Legacy
28th	US$5,000	The Huns Esports
29th	US$5,000	RED Canids
30th	US$5,000	GamerLegion
31st	US$5,000	Lynn Vision Gaming
32nd	US$5,000	Rare Atom
