= Sangal Esports =

Professional esports organization

- Sport: CS2
- Founded: 2017
- Location: Netherlands; Turkey
- Head coach: Jimmy "Jumpy" Berndtsson
- Main sponsor: 1xBet

Sangal Esports is a professional esports organization founded in 2017 by Emre Ergül. The organization has teams competing in Counter-Strike 2 and Valorant. In September 2020, Sangal started a partnership with Kaspersky.

== History ==
In September 2020, Sangal began collaborating with Kaspersky.

On 7 July 2021, during the Good Party group meeting, the party leader Meral Akşener spoke about the internet, gaming, and esports, then handed the podium to Sangal Esports co-founder Hamza Sönmez.

On 28 July 2021, the organization decided to move its headquarters from Turkey to the Netherlands.

== Roster ==
=== Counter-Strike 2 ===
OG Counter-Strike 2 roster
Players
Coaches

Handle	Name	Nationality
clax	Sabirov, Timur	Russia
Patsi	Isyanov, Robert	Russia
pr1metapz	Voigt, Luca	Germany
danistzz	Roslyakov, Danil	Russia
R4DYX	Ozan, Selman	Turkey
h0kz (I)	Sarıçam, Hakan	Turkey

Head coach

Jimmy "Jumpy" Berndtsson

Legend:
- (I) Inactive
- (S) Suspended
- Substitute
- (injured) Injury / Illness

Roster updated 10 February 2026.
