= List of competitive Counter-Strike maps =

Counter-Strike 2, and its predecessor Counter-Strike: Global Offensive, are first-person shooter games developed by Valve Corporation in the Counter-Strike series. The franchise has a very large competitive scene, which has received large media coverage. As a result, the games' multiplayer maps have longstanding legacies within the series, with some becoming significant to the first-person shooter genre as a whole.

Traditional gameplay of Counter-Strike features two teams, the Terrorists and Counter-Terrorists, fighting for control of a map while trying to fulfill their respective objectives. In Counter-Strike esports, the goal of the Terrorist team is to either kill all Counter-Terrorists or plant and detonate a bomb at a bomb site within the map, and the goal of the Counter-Terrorist team is to prevent the bomb plant, kill all Terrorists, or defuse the bomb.

This article serves as a list of maps featured in Counter-Strike: Global Offensive and Counter-Strike 2 that have established notability in the first-person shooter genre or in the games' competitive scenes.

== Competitive maps ==
Different game modes have separate map pools, but Valve designates a group of seven as the "Active Duty" pool. Such maps are considered the most balanced and competitive by Valve and were used in nearly all competitive Counter-Strike esports tournaments, as well as the Premier matchmaking mode. The group of seven are chosen from a wider set of maps, with some community-created maps and some designed by Valve.

The list of Active Duty maps changes occasionally, generally by replacing one map at a time. Maps such as Dust II have been added, removed, and added back again.

As of July 2026, the seven Active Duty maps in Counter-Strike 2 are Ancient, Anubis, Cache, Dust II, Inferno, Mirage and Nuke.

=== Ancient ===
Ancient (de_ancient) was introduced to the game in a December 2020 update as part of "Operation Broken Fang". The map takes place in an archeological site, likely in Central America, and was created as a homage to a previous Counter-Strike map titled de_aztec. The map has received consistent changes and upgrades since its introduction.

The map has consistently appeared in competitive tournaments since its introduction and it is among the most played competitive maps alongside Mirage and Inferno. The map is part of the Active Duty map pool.

=== Anubis ===
Anubis (de_anubis) is a community-created map introduced in a March 2020 update at the end of "Operation Shattered Web". The map is set in Egypt. The map was noted for being buggy upon release, but has been updated over time.

In November 2022, Valve contacted the creators of the map, Roald van der Scheur, "Jakuza", and "jd_40", and offered to buy out the rights to it, an unusual occurrence. Upon their acceptance, it replaced Dust II in the competitive map pool in November 2022, becoming the final competitive change before the release of Counter-Strike 2. The map went from the least popular competitive map to a popular choice during the 2023 Paris Major. The map was part of the Active Duty map pool until July 2025, when it was replaced by Overpass. Anubis would return to the Active Duty pool in January 2026, replacing Train.

=== Cache ===
Cache (de_cache) is a map first made for Counter-Strike: Source in 2004, and was introduced to the Global Offensive's main competitive map pool in "Operation Breakout" in 2014. It, along with Anubis, have been the only community-made maps to be featured in the Active Duty map pool. It was removed from the game in March 2019 and replaced by Vertigo, before being updated as a standalone map outside of competitive play later that year.

According to Rock, Paper, Shotgun, Cache has been compared to Inferno and Dust II, as one of the most well designed maps in the Counter-Strike series. The map was used in a study from Uppsala University for a full analysis on level design in competitive video games. A remake of the original Cache was a very popular demand for Counter-Strike 2's competitive map pool.

Following its overhaul for Counter-Strike 2, Valve reportedly purchased the map from its creator FMPONE on May 24, 2025.

The new version of Cache was released via a Counter-Strike 2 update on April 28, 2026. It was added to the Active Duty map pool on July 6, replacing Overpass. The map was subsequently played at the 2026 Esports World Cup.

=== Dust II ===
Dust II, also known by its filename de_dust2, is a video game map featured in the first-person shooter series Counter-Strike. Dust II is the successor to "Dust", another Counter-Strike map, and was developed by David Johnston before the official release of the original Counter-Strike game. It was designed with the aims of simplicity and balance, based on its symmetrical design and two points, over which the two teams must fight for control.

The map was first released in March 2001 for the original Counter-Strike game and is present in all games in the series. Apart from graphical updates, it underwent minimal changes after its initial release, before receiving a significant visual revision in Counter-Strike: Global Offensive in October 2017. The map has been popular with players since its initial release, and both its original and revised design in Global Offensive have been positively received by players and mapmakers.

=== Inferno ===
Inferno, also known by its filename de_inferno, is a multiplayer map in the Counter-Strike series of first-person shooter video games by Valve Corporation. The map was first created for the original Counter-Strike in a 2001 update and has subsequently appeared in each series entry. While considered a traditional map in the series, its design differs from maps such as Dust II, featuring many hiding spots and branching, narrow paths.

The map was remade from the ground up for Counter-Strike: Source in 2005, changing large parts of the map and moving the setting from the Middle East to Europe. The map returned for Counter-Strike: Global Offensive in 2012 and was revamped in a 2016 update, adjusting the map's graphics and visibility. The map returned in Counter-Strike 2, featuring various enhancements and graphical upgrades.

Since its introduction, Inferno has been one of the most popular maps in the Counter-Strike series in casual and competitive play. It has become an influential multiplayer map across the whole first-person shooter genre, being used as a community map in different games and declared one of the best multiplayer maps ever made.

=== Mirage ===
"Mirage", also known by its filename de_mirage, is a video game map in the first-person shooter series Counter-Strike. Released officially in 2013 by Valve Corporation, the game's developer, it expanded the original Counter-Strike and Counter-Strike: Source map "de_cpl_strike", developed by Michael "BubkeZ" Hüll. One of Counter-Strike's most popular maps, Mirage has been used in a number of esports tournaments and Major Championships due to its balanced level design and its opportunities for players to display their tactical and coordination skills. Over time, the map has undergone changes and updates by Valve to improve its quality and increase the tactical balance.

=== Nuke ===
"Nuke", also known by its filename de_nuke, is a multiplayer map in the Counter-Strike series of first-person shooter video games by Valve Corporation, centered around bomb defusal. Set outside and inside the premises of a nuclear power plant as counter-terrorists attempt to repel a devastating attack, it was first released in November 1999 for the original Counter-Strike. It received a significant redesign in 2016 for Counter-Strike: Global Offensive as part of the "Operation Wildfire" update, which added more realistic detail and tweaked its layout. Another update was made to the map in 2018. It is used heavily in competitive play, and continues to be divisive for its design even after its revamp due to its complex layout and large open areas. It is notorious for being a haven for the defending team.

=== Overpass ===
Overpass (de_overpass) was the first competitive map intentionally designed for Global Offensive, and was released in a December 2013 update alongside an updated version of Cobblestone. The map features a roadway bridging over an open canal, adjacent to a public park. The map has an increased emphasis on long-ranged combat. Overpass was updated in April 2014.

The map was one of the most balanced in the game upon release, and has become a very important competitive map. Overpass was added into the Active Duty map pool in 2014 in Global Offensive, and this was carried over into the start of Counter-Strike 2. In April 2024, Overpass was removed from CS2's active duty pool in order to make room for Dust II's return, which led to mixed reactions from players and members of the pro scene. Overpass would be added back into the active duty pool in July 2025, replacing Anubis, before being removed a year later to be replaced by Cache.

=== Train ===
Train (de_train) is a map which was first created for the original Counter-Strike in a 1999 update and was remade for Global Offensive in a December 2014 update. It is set in a trainyard and train station featuring many ladders, high platforms, long angles, and tight corridors. It was removed from the competitive map pool in May of 2021 and replaced by Ancient. Train was added back to the competitive map pool in January 2025, replacing Vertigo, before being removed a year later in favor of Anubis.

=== Vertigo ===
Vertigo (de_vertigo) is a map added to the original Counter-Strike in 2001, added to Global Offensive in an October 2012 update and added to the competitive map pool in May 2019, replacing the popular map Cache. The map is situated on the top of a skyscraper in an unnamed city.

Vertigo has become relatively unpopular due to its awkward design. While the map was part of the Active Duty map pool, it was a popular choice for removal from Counter-Strike 2. In January 2025, Vertigo was removed from the Active Duty map pool (in preparation for the 2025 BLAST Austin Major) and replaced by Train.

== Other maps ==
=== Canals ===
Canals (de_canals) was added to the game in a March 2017 update. The map takes place in a city inspired by Venice, Italy. It was the first new official Counter-Strike map since the addition of Overpass in 2013. Canals varies from traditional Counter-Strike level design, and gives the Terrorists a crescent-shaped starting area that is relatively cramped, but gives the Counter-Terrorists a large open area. The map also features additional routes that allow players to go under parts of the map to stealthily arrive to the bomb sites.

Canals was added to the Reserve map pool, placing it outside of traditional competitive play and the map has not seen play in any of the Counter-Strike majors. The map has been criticized for having an unorthodox layout that has been considered heavily unbalanced in favor of the Terrorists.
