= Dustnet =

2019 video game

- Developer: SCRNPRNT
- Publisher: SCRNPRNT
- Platforms: Windows, macOS, Android, iOS
- Release: July 16, 2019
- Genre: Action
- Mode: Multiplayer

Dustnet (stylized as DUSTNET) is a 2019 asymmetrical, action, sandbox video game developed by Canadian studio SCRNPRNT. The game explores the theme of "dying" or disappearing multiplayer video games and their player bases, with the gameplay being set around a copy of the Dust II multiplayer map, originally created for Counter-Strike in 2001.

== Gameplay ==
Many of Dustnet's features are in direct reference to Counter-Strike, such as an unlockable "Bunny hopping" feature, selection between one "Counter-Terrorist" and one "Terrorist" team upon joining a server, and the presence of a bomb to be defused. A deathmatch mechanic is present, with available weapons being references to the Counter-Strike and Quake video game series.

However, many of these features are inserted merely as references to the game's theme. For example, the bomb to be defused, which is a central point of importance in the Counter-Strike series, is of no particular importance in Dustnet. Instead, players may edit and build upon the original "Dust II" layout, copying parts of it or laying down new map pieces such as teleporters, jump pads, and ammo pickups. Players with access to virtual reality headsets will appear to normal PC players as giant floating pairs of hands, which may smite or haul other players around the game world, as well as edit and build upon the level on a greater scale.

As a tie-in to the game's themes, a server's player-made creations are permanent for as long as there are players connected to it, but will be erased if the server becomes empty. Besides this, a server may go into a state named "low-energy mode", where the game's visuals and audio become more dull and muted. This can be prevented by executing game-related actions such as joining a server, searching through a defeated player's inventory, or planting the bomb.

The game features a free augmented reality companion app, available for Android and iOS. It allows players to observe and interact with one of the game's servers in real time.

== Development ==
Dustnet was created and published by SCRNPRNT, a Canadian developer created by brothers Milan and Neilson Koerner-Safrata. The game was released on Steam and itch.io on July 16, 2019. According to Neilson, he wanted to imagine the "death of a well known and loved space", here represented by the "Dust II" map for it being the most "resilient virtual space" in the world. Despite this, the game was not developed with the intention of reproducing the gameplay of Counter-Strike in mind, but focused itself on capturing the feeling of exploring game servers made in the Source engine. The game's original soundtrack was composed by Iven Jansen.

Following the release of their 2020 video game The Garden Of Earthly Delights, SCRNPRNT described both projects as "recontextualizing game space, allowing for open-ended play and consideration of video games situated from a broader perspective".

== Reception ==
Writing for Rock Paper Shotgun, Alice O'Connor called Dustnet a "strange and wonderful dream", and a "fascinating way to remember a map, a game and a culture". Kotaku praised the game as a fascinating environment, though commenting on the lack of goals and definite structures, and PC Gamer praised the game for its discussion of "ideas that feel essential".
