= Mirage (Counter-Strike) =

Counter-Strike map

- Counter-Strike location
- The A Site in Counter-Strike 2 (de_mirage)
- First appearance: Counter-Strike (Original) Counter-Strike: Global Offensive (Valve remake)
- Created by: Michael "BubkeZ" Hüll
- Genre: First-person shooter

"Mirage", also known by its filename de_mirage, is a video game map in the first-person shooter series Counter-Strike. Released officially in 2013 by Valve Corporation, the game's developer, it expanded the original Counter-Strike and Counter-Strike: Source map "de_cpl_strike", developed by Michael "BubkeZ" Hüll. One of Counter-Strike's most popular maps, Mirage has been used in a number of esports tournaments and Major Championships due to its balanced level design and its opportunities for players to display their tactical and coordination skills. Over time, the map has undergone changes and updates by Valve to improve its quality and increase the tactical balance.

== Design ==
Minimap of Mirage

The level design of Mirage follows the traditional square design of Counter-Strike maps such as Dust II, Cache, and Inferno. It is built around a Middle East-inspired town, which contains a number of different buildings and structures, such as apartment buildings, fortresses, stores, and courtyards.

Mirage is structured similarly to other bomb defusal maps like Dust II, featuring two bombsites with two main entrances from either spawn, linked to a "mid" area with connecting pathways.

== History ==
Mirage started as a Counter-Strike community map known as de_cpl_strike, created by Michael "BubkeZ" Hüll. In 2013, it was remade by Valve as de_mirage, and was officially added to the game on 12 June 2013. It has become one of the top three maps used in competitive play and in matchmaking.

The new map design was crafted based on community feedback and included improved textures and lighting with the purposes of increasing player readability, and a new setting change, making the map different from the previous community-made Mirage version and de_cpl_strike maps from previous games in tone. It has been featured in every CS:GO Major Championship to date.

Mirage was included in CS:GO's successor, Counter-Strike 2 at launch in September 2023, and by December 2023 it was the most played map in both Premier and FACEIT matchmaking.

== Reception ==
Mike Stubbs of Red Bull stated that the map had "long been a favorite of many" due to its simple layout and unchanging nature. On Game Rant, PaulAn'drey Pierre-Louis called it a "mainstay" for its "balance, unique aesthetic, and low learning curve", also noting that it gained a reputation in professional play for upsets. Dot Esports called the map ideal for learning strategy, saying that it required good knowledge of rotations and map control. In 2017, Scott Dahkle of ESPN commented on the map's increasing use in esports over competing maps like Train, calling it the "most important map-to-be", and saying the shift made sense due to the development of better grenades and tactics that enabled more possibilities for its three-lane layout. By 2022, Leonardo Biazzi of Dot Esports reported on how the map's meta had become stale, noting professional teams repeated the same strategy in every match due to the map's lack of updates since 2020. He noted that although the map has been featured in over 18 CS:GO Major championships some esports players have called for its removal from the map pool, although he called the possibility unclear due to its status as one of the game's most-played and best-optimized maps.
