= Makazze =

Kosovar gamer

Drin Shaqiri

Current team
- Team: NAVI
- Role: Rifler
- Game: Counter-Strike 2

Personal information
- Nickname: Makazze
- Born: December 21, 2006 (age 19); Kosovo
- Nationality: Kosovar

Drin Shaqiri (born December 21, 2006), known by his in-game pseudonym Makazze, is a Kosovar professional Counter-Strike 2 player who competes as a main rifler for Natus Vincere.

== Early life ==
Shaqiri was born in Kosovo. He began playing Counter-Strike 1.6 at four years old before competing in European regional tournaments.

== Esports career ==
=== NAVI Junior ===
In October 2023, Shaqiri signed with NAVI Junior, the academy division of Ukrainian esports organization Natus Vincere. During his time with the academy roster, his individual performances drew coverage from international esports news outlets.

=== Natus Vincere main roster ===
In June 2025, Shaqiri was officially promoted to Natus Vincere's primary roster as a starting rifler.

Following his promotion, Shaqiri competed in top-tier international competitions, including playoff stages at major international tournaments. In March 2026, he achieved a major tournament victory at ESL Pro League Season 23, earning widespread coverage in general mainstream news as a prominent Kosovar athlete.
