= Nuke (Counter-Strike) =

Counter-Strike map

- Counter-Strike location
- Overview of the exterior of de_nuke
- First appearance: Counter-Strike (2000)
- Genre: First-person shooter

"Nuke", also known by its filename de_nuke, is a multiplayer map in the Counter-Strike series of first-person shooter video games by Valve Corporation, centered around bomb defusal. Set outside and inside the premises of a nuclear power plant as counter-terrorists attempt to repel a devastating attack, it was first released in November 1999 for the original Counter-Strike. It received a significant redesign in 2016 for Counter-Strike: Global Offensive as part of the "Operation Wildfire" update, which added more realistic detail and tweaked its layout. Another update was made to the map in 2018. It is used heavily in competitive play, and continues to be divisive for its design even after its revamp due to its complex layout and large open areas. It is notorious for being a haven for the defending team.

== History ==
The original Nuke map for Counter-Strike was set in a Southwestern canyon environment similar to that of the Half-Life level Surface Tension, including shipping crates belonging to Black Mesa Research Facility. The interior parts of the map were set in a rusty warehouse holding nuclear materials. In Counter-Strike Source, it was modified to resemble an old, decommissioned nuclear plant with cooling towers under a gloomy sky. While initially being set in Germany, it was later switched to an American plant.

Upon the level's 2016 redesign, its appearance was updated to have a "clean institutional aesthetic" based on real nuclear plants, and its name altered to the Cedar Creek Nuclear Power Plant. This, and its switch to a bright, sunny blue sky, were done to give the level a more readable aesthetic as well as increase believability within the in-game setting. More clearly defined purposes for rooms made player call-outs more useful.

== Reception ==
In 2016, Alex Walker of Kotaku called Nuke one of the series' most iconic maps, describing it as a fortress for counter-terrorists. He explained that its one-sided nature, even after the redesign, meant the map "wasn't fun" and was hated by both pro players and low-level matchmaking teams, causing it to be constantly vetoed. Ben Barrett of PCGamesN also described it as one of the series' most famous and regularly played, calling it one of the limited maps good enough for professional play. Despite its relatively new redesign, Nuke was added back to the competitive map pool to replace Inferno, causing controversy amongst professionals, some of whom called for other maps to be removed instead. Robin "flusha" Rönnquist, a former member of Fnatic, described the new Nuke as "such a chaotic map, you don't know how well you can actually play it", also calling it "just a bad map". Nevertheless, Ninjas in Pyjamas, who were one of the best teams on the former Nuke, were pleased about the change, saying they were "very excited to have it back".

Alice O'Connor of Rock Paper Shotgun praised the 2016 redesign in aesthetic terms, calling the map's new appearance "lovely" and the tweaks to the map's layout "small but clever". Calling balancing levels "a complex and wonderful art", she called on developers to talk more about small but important level changes.

Mitch Bowman of PC Gamer stated in 2018 that Nuke was Global Offensive's least popular map by far, saying that its popularity had waned sharply since 2014. He interviewed professional players, noting there was not a consensus on why it became unpopular. While some players believed it was simply a complex map requiring special tactics, others thought it was fundamentally flawed and required a full redesign. Nathan "NBK-" Schmitt of G2 Esports stated his opinion that Nuke was underrated, calling it unique and different, describing success as heavily dependent on skill. The players interviewed agreed the unpopularity issue was caused by a lack of communication between them and Valve.

Regarding the Counter-Strike 2 version of Nuke, Harrison Thomas of Dot Esports noted that the game's new and more realistic lighting system caused deeper player shadows to be visible, allowing them to be spotted from different locations even outside of line-of-sight. Players debated whether the new shadows ruined the effectiveness of certain positions or not, with Harrison expressing his belief that, if they were not changed, a "shadow meta" would become the norm for interior areas.

Henge, a designer of fan-made levels, was noted for their total conversion of three other multiplayer maps - Cache, Office, and Mirage - to appear as though they take place within Nuke's setting. Natalie Clayton of PC Gamer praised the custom maps, saying that "It speaks to Henge's competence that I have to remind myself that I'm not just looking at Nuke from a new angle".
