= Inferno (Counter-Strike) =

Counter-Strike map

- Counter-Strike location
- Overview of Bombsite A on Inferno after the 2016 update for Global Offensive
- First appearance: Counter-Strike
- Created by: Christopher Auty
- Genre: First-person shooter

In-universe information
- Location: Europe (possibly Italy)

Inferno, also known by its filename de_inferno, is a multiplayer map in the Counter-Strike series of first-person shooter video games by Valve Corporation. The map was first created for the original Counter-Strike in a 2001 update and has subsequently appeared in each series entry. While considered a traditional map in the series, its design differs from maps such as Dust II, featuring many hiding spots and branching, narrow paths.

The map was remade from the ground up for Counter-Strike: Source in 2005, changing large parts of the map and moving the setting from the Middle East to Europe. The map returned for Counter-Strike: Global Offensive in 2012 and was revamped in a 2016 update, adjusting the map's graphics and visibility. The map returned in Counter-Strike 2, featuring various enhancements and graphical upgrades.

Since its introduction, Inferno has been one of the most popular maps in the Counter-Strike series in casual and competitive play. It has become an influential multiplayer map across the whole first-person shooter genre, being used as a community map in different games and declared one of the best multiplayer maps ever made.

== Design ==
Minimap of Inferno in Global Offensive. Green signifies team spawns, and red signifies bombsites.

Inferno is a multiplayer map taking place in a small European village, possibly located in Italy. As in other bomb defusal maps in the game, players are split into two teams; The Terrorists and the Counter Terrorists. The goal of the Terrorists is to plant a bomb near the map's water pipelines or to kill all Counter Terrorists, with the goal of the Counter Terrorists being either to defuse the bomb or to kill all Terrorists.

Inferno's design is very traditional compared to other Counter-Strike maps. Counter Terrorists start in control of most of the map, but may be able to lose control easily. Due to Inferno's number of paths, there are many locations where conflict can arise, though some sites experience more conflict than others, such as the map's choke points.

Inferno features various choke points crucial to both sides, as they control important locations and will experience points of conflict. The "Banana" is a large central stairway that serves as the most direct route to Bombsite B for the Terrorists. Alongside the Banana, there are two other locations in the middle of the map that experience conflict, "Middle" and "Bridge". While Middle is a fairly standard pathway, Bridge controls another area known as "Alt. Middle", the direct route to Bombsite A. Bridge is accessed via two Terrorist-controlled locations, giving Terrorists an advantage in the Alt. Middle route. Alongside these locations are other branching paths across the map through the insides of apartment buildings, as well as a drainage area connecting Middle to Alt. Middle is known as the "Underpass". Despite its unique structure, Inferno features one of the most even win–loss rates in Counter Strike: Global Offensive.

The map also features chickens for players to shoot as an homage to an original Counter-Strike map known as cs_italy, as well as playable tic-tac-toe as an Easter egg. In commemoration of a major-winning grenade from Mikhail "Dosia" Stolyarov in a 2017 major, a graffiti Easter egg at the Pit is also featured on the map.

== History ==
Inferno as it first appeared in Counter-Strike as a Middle Eastern village

The map was added as part of Update 1.1 for the original Counter-Strike game in 2001, alongside other maps such as Vertigo and Dust II. The map was designed in two weeks by Christopher "Narby" Auty and was originally situated in a rebel stronghold in a small Middle Eastern village. The premise of the map was for the Terrorists to destroy oil pipelines and wreak havoc on the Western economy. This version of the map was also featured in Counter-Strike: Condition Zero.

=== Source ===
The map was completely rebuilt for Counter-Strike: Source, being redesigned as a European village. Alongside the visual changes, the map's layout and gameplay were drastically affected, with several locations recreated. The Counter Terrorist spawn changed from a narrow back alley to an open court with a well, various halls and alleys in the original map were changed to interiors of buildings, and both bomb sites were redesigned.

=== Global Offensive ===
The map returned in Counter-Strike: Global Offensive as a base game map, with minor graphical enhancements and layout changes from the Source version. Not many changes were made initially, but some modifications, such as a hallway at the Terrorist spawn being removed, did occur. They also added factions to the map, with the SAS representing the counter-terrorists and the separatists representing the terrorists, the latter of which caused as controversy in Spain as they resembled the ETA. In early 2016, Inferno was swapped out of the active duty map pool to be updated, being exchanged for the newly updated Nuke.

Later that year in October, the map received its major update. The map's narrow paths and visibility were increased, giving the Terrorists more options to attack the Counter Terrorists. The map graphics were updated, making the map more scenic and eliminating the cloudy skies of the Source version. After the update, Inferno returned to active duty in February 2017, replacing Dust II and joining its former replacement Nuke. After replacing Dust II in the active duty map pool, Inferno returned to being one of the game's most important and most played competitive maps, and would be played in the rest of the game's majors.

=== Counter-Strike 2 ===
A screenshot of Inferno in Counter-Strike 2, demonstrating the graphical enhancements made to the map

During the Source 2 update for Global Offensive (known as Counter-Strike 2), Several Counter-Strike maps were given upgrades to utilize the features of Source 2. When Counter-Strike 2 was announced in March 2023, Inferno was confirmed to be among the maps receiving updates. In June 2023, screenshots of the Counter-Strike 2 version of Inferno leaked on Twitter before being confirmed by Valve, revealing a redesigned church interior, upgraded bomb sites, and upgraded building designs. Lighting and graphical changes were also made across the map. On August 31, 2023, during the Counter-Strike 2 Limited Test, the map's redesign was officially released alongside competitive matchmaking. Alongside the already leaked map changes, adjustments were made to several other areas, such as the Banana. On September 27, 2023, Counter-Strike 2 released and replaced Global Offensive, and Inferno was included at launch as a base game map.

== Reception ==
Inferno has been described as one of the best maps in Counter-Strike: Global Offensive by TheGamer and Dot Esports. In 2022, Inferno was the second most popular map in the game's casual and competitive matchmaking, only beaten by Mirage. In the rankings from TheGamer and Dot Esports on the best maps in the game regarding balance, Inferno was ranked #1 for its unique risk and reward design and ease of learning to new players. In a map design analysis, Rock Paper Shotgun praised the map for being one of the game's five "most traditional" maps. After the final Global Offensive major in early 2023, it was revealed that Inferno was the most played map in the game's majors, being played 263 times, with Mirage being played 243 times. The map was featured in all of the game's majors except the Cologne 2016 and Atlanta 2017, which took place during the maps update period.

When Nuke replaced Inferno in early 2016, the map switch proved controversial. Gabriel "FalleN" Toledo, the captain of then-world champions SK Gaming, stated that he would have preferred Cobblestone or Dust II to be removed instead. The controversy continued into September, with Dot Esports stating that Valve needed to be more clear with how it changed the active duty map pool, criticizing the effect it had on professional teams and their practice routines.

After the map's redesign in October of that year, the redesign was described by Chris Higgins of Red Bull as hurting the Counter-Terrorist side, giving more options and cover for opposing teams to plant the bomb. In the same year, Dot Esports remarked that professional North American Esports teams were historically terrible on Inferno due to a lack of effective strategy, causing them to lose games and series throughout 2015. The publication noted that the map "requires highly disciplined and refined CT (Counter-Terrorist) play", a strong point for European teams.

When the Counter-Strike 2 version of Inferno leaked on Twitter, Kiril Stoilov of Dot Esports called the redesigned map "so much more lively and detailed that it's near impossible not to be in awe of what you're seeing". He noted the map's church, whose interior was completely reconstructed, while also singling out changes to each bomb site. Upon the map's release in August 2023, the new design was acclaimed by the community, with top comments on a Reddit post reading that Valve "seriously outdid themselves".

=== Legacy ===
Alex Walker of Kotaku described it as one of the best multiplayer maps in video games, and Evan Lahti of PC Gamer chose it as his pick for the best video game level of the 2010s. After the release of Call of Duty: Modern Warfare 3, Inferno became a popular community mod for Call of Duty 4: Modern Warfare on PC.
