= Dust II =

Video game map in the Counter-Strike series

- Counter-Strike location
- The A Site in Counter-Strike: Global Offensive after the October 2017 update
- First appearance: Counter-Strike
- Created by: David Johnston
- Genre: First-person shooter

Dust II, also known by its filename de_dust2, is a video game map featured in the first-person shooter series Counter-Strike. Dust II is the successor to "Dust", another Counter-Strike map, and was developed by David Johnston before the official release of the original Counter-Strike game. It was designed with the aims of simplicity and balance, based on its symmetrical design and two points, over which the two teams must fight for control.

The map was first released in March 2001 for the original Counter-Strike game and is present in all games in the series. Apart from graphical updates, it underwent minimal changes after its initial release, before receiving a significant visual revision in Counter-Strike: Global Offensive in October 2017. The map has been popular with players since its initial release, and both its original and revised design in Global Offensive have been positively received by players and mapmakers.

== Design ==
Dust II minimap; red representing bomb points, and green representing team spawn areas (Top is Counter-Terrorists, bottom is Terrorists.)

Dust II is a video game map featured in the first-person shooter series Counter-Strike. The map is set in a dusty environment based on a mixture of North African, Turkish, and Andalusian influences. Like the other maps in the game, players are divided into two teams: Terrorists and Counter-Terrorists. The Terrorists have a limited time in which to plant and detonate a bomb; the Counter-Terrorists try to stop them from planting the bomb or to defuse it if it has already been planted. The Terrorist side must gain control in one of two locations to plant the bomb; these sites are easily accessible to the Counter-Terrorists at the beginning of the round. The map has a few main choke points: "Middle", "Long A", and "B Tunnels". Of its layout, the map's creator David Johnston wrote: "...Dust was little more than a figure-of-eight that had grown a pair of arms and legs, centralizing the battles but providing tactical wiggle room."

The main choke points contain tactically important positions and areas. Middle has three main areas: Catwalk, an elevated pathway that leads to Short on A site; Lower Tunnels, a tunnel leading from Middle to Upper Tunnels; and Middle Doors, that has a set of open double doors at Middle, which leads to the Counter-Terrorist's spawn. At Long A, there are another three important areas before approaching the A Site. Long Doors are the two sets of open double doors that lead from the Terrorist's spawn to Long A; Pit is a sloped area where players can hide or use for cover near Long Doors; and Counter-Terrorist spawn, located right of Long A from A Site, is where the Counter-Terrorists spawn. B Tunnels has two main areas; Upper Tunnels and Lower Tunnels. Upper Tunnels leads to the B site or Terrorist spawn; Lower Tunnels leads to Upper Tunnels or Middle.

Johnston stated in a blog post that, in making Dust II, he "had to ensure that this new map had everything in common with Dust, without actually being Dust". He began identifying what made Dust unique and Johnston kept the simple structures, ramps, crates, and "Dust doors"; these were elements he knew had to stay. Though, he wanted to add other elements, an area with close combat and an area with long-range fights, which turned into B Tunnels and Long A. Compared to Dust, he was patient in using the "trim" feature, an element that separated certain objects; he said he, "tried to use the trim very carefully, only exactly when needed, and not just as filler". He set certain rules for himself with trimming so that he did not overuse or under-use it; overusing would make the map too complex and under-using would make it too flat. Another thing different from Dust is that Dust II did not undergo any other major layout changes.

== History ==
Dust II was developed by David Johnston for the first game in the series as a conceptual sequel to the existing Dust map. Chris "MacMan" Ashton helped provide textures for the map. Johnston originally titled it "Dust 3" because he did not think it was a worthy successor to Dust; before the game's launch it was retitled Dust II. The map was designed to be simple and balanced. During the initial development of the map, "Long A", a long pathway that leads towards the "A Site", was not present. It existed in the map because of space limitations of the engine. During development, map features such as caverns that would have provided cover, a window in "B Site", and a longer ramp in the Counter-Terrorist's Spawn to A Site were removed.

After its initial release on March 13, 2001, as part of Counter-Strike 1.1, the map received minimal changes following updates to the rest of the game, but received small graphical updates and lighting changes. It also received graphical updates in Counter-Strike: Condition Zero and Counter-Strike's Xbox release.

=== Counter-Strike: Source ===
Counter-Strike: Source was allowed to use Valve's new Source game engine and changed some of the physics. Dust II received a graphical update and new objects that would affect gameplay were added. New doors were added and a crate at "Middle" was made easier to climb. A raised ceiling made firing down from T spawn onto Mid Doors easier.

=== Counter-Strike: Global Offensive ===
Counter-Strike: Global Offensive featured more graphical updates and changed all of the doors from wooden doors to metal doors, making them much more difficult to penetrate. In an update on February 3, 2017, Dust II was removed from the Active Duty Competitive Pool, a group of whitelisted maps for professional games, in the competitive game mode. It was instead replaced by "Inferno" and, at the same time, given its own exclusive map group in the Casual and Deathmatch game modes.

In October 2017, Valve released a beta remake of the map, which improved upon player readability, visuals, and movement. A week later, the updated version was made public. In April 2018, the map was put back in the Active Duty Competitive Pool, replacing "Cobblestone". In November 2022, Valve removed Dust II from the Active Duty Competitive Pool in favor of "Anubis".

=== Counter-Strike 2 ===
During the development of Counter-Strike 2, alongside all other maps in Global Offensive, Dust II received graphical upgrades. The map was referred to by Valve as a "touchstone" map, meaning that it received graphical and lighting enhancements but would retain relatively the same layout.

In April 2024, Dust II was added back to Active Duty rotation replacing Overpass, causing mixed reactions from players and members of the esports scene.

== Reception ==
Dust II has been in every Counter-Strike game to date and, as of the 2017 updates, continues to receive positive reception from mapmakers and players. Shawn "FMPONE" Snelling, a Counter-Strike mapmaker, said: "Valve has given the map a very cohesive and 'tactile' look, making it easier to get a read on your surroundings". Mitch Bowman of PC Gamer praised the 2017 update, stating: "It's a healthy overhaul that makes some modest but interesting changes without reinventing the wheel." Professional Counter-Strike players have mixed opinions; some players enjoyed the update and its changes, while some were disapproving. Jake "Stewie2K" Yip criticized the addition of a car to the map, saying, "you can hide behind it well, and I just think it's kind of overpowered".

=== Impact and legacy ===
An imitation of Dust II in Far Cry 5's "Far Cry Arcade"

Dust II has existed since 2001 and has been subject to imitation, spin-offs, and has variously received praise and criticism from the gaming community. In February 2017, the map was removed from the Active Duty Competitive Pool in Global Offensive, a group of maps played in professional competitions. The map was removed in favor of a revamped version of a map titled Inferno. There was an immediate backlash to this change from professional players and community members; according to Peter "ptr" Gurney, Valve "[took] out a map that's balanced and put a map in that literally has at least 4-5 problems I can think of right away". Fabien "kioShiMa" Fiey, another professional Counter-Strike player, said, "Why is everyone so surprised. Looks logical that [Dust II] is removed, the only one that has not been redone??", referring to the earlier reworking and refinement of other Global Offensive maps before this change.

There have been several imitations and recreations of Dust II. In early 2014, it was reported that the map had been recreated in real life, though the location of its recreation is not known. Dust II has also been found in other games because of the work of modders. In 2018, Luke Millanta published a re-textured version of Dust II in which the map's original textures had been replaced by cyberpunk-themed materials. The map has seen imitations in games such as Far Cry 3, Far Cry 5, Crossfire, Minecraft, and Cube 2: Sauerbraten. In 2023, a user named Nic remade Dust II from the ground up in Unreal Engine 5 over the course of a month, revamping the entire map's graphics to make them realistic.

The game Dustnet explores the theme of the fragility of multiplayer experiences and player bases, and is set in the far future, entirely inside "the last copy of de_dust2 in the world". It includes a hidden homage to David Johnston, the original creator of Dust and Dust II, as well as numerous references to Counter-Strike and Quake.
