= Counter-Strike 2 =

2023 video game

- Developer: Valve
- Publisher: Valve
- Composer: Mike Morasky
- Series: Counter-Strike
- Engine: Source 2
- Platforms: Windows; Linux
- Release: September 27, 2023
- Genre: First-person shooter
- Mode: Multiplayer

Counter-Strike 2 is a 2023 free-to-play first-person shooter video game developed and published by Valve. It is the fifth main entry in the Counter-Strike series, produced as an updated version of the previous entry, Counter-Strike: Global Offensive (2012). As with its predecessor, the game pits two opposing teams, the Counter-Terrorists and the Terrorists, against each other in various objective-based game modes.

Counter-Strike 2 features major technical improvements over Global Offensive, including a move from the Source game engine to Source 2, improved graphics, and a new "sub-tick" server architecture. In addition, many maps from Global Offensive were updated to take advantage of the features of Source 2, with some maps receiving complete overhauls. The game was announced on March 22, 2023, and was released on September 27, 2023, for Windows and Linux, replacing Global Offensive on Steam.

Upon release, Counter-Strike 2 received generally favorable reviews from critics, with praise for its gunplay and overhauled maps. Conversely, player reception was mixed, with criticism directed towards the game's performance, the removal of several features that were present in Global Offensive, and the discontinuation of Global Offensive's support for the macOS operating system.

== Gameplay ==
A screenshot of Counter-Strike 2, demonstrating gameplay from the Terrorist side on Anubis. Note the volumetric smoke cloud, a feature new to Counter-Strike 2.

Counter-Strike 2 is a multiplayer tactical first-person shooter, in which two teams, the Terrorists and Counter-Terrorists, compete to complete various objectives. The game includes two round-based objective scenarios: bomb defusal and hostage rescue, with the bomb defusal scenario making up the primary gameplay experience. New gameplay features in Counter-Strike 2 include volumetric "smoke physics", a feature where the smoke generated by a smoke grenade grows to fill spaces, and can be altered in real time by gunshots or through the use of hand grenades, and a redesign to weapon reloading, with reloading now discarding all remaining ammunition in a magazine upon replacement, rather than returning it to the reserve pool; players can also perform "silent" reloads that do not produce noise to enemies, but take longer to complete. Additionally, the game features a revised weapon loadout system, which only allows players to bring five pistols, five "mid-tier" weapons (i.e submachine guns and shotguns), and five rifles with them into a match, for a total of fifteen weapons.

In standard bomb defusal matches, the Terrorist and Counter-Terrorist teams each have five players. In these game modes, eliminated players do not respawn until the next round. Within each round, the goal of the Terrorist team is to plant a bomb at one of two bombsites on the map and defend the bombsite until the bomb explodes. The Terrorist team can also win the round by eliminating the Counter-Terrorist team. The Counter-Terrorists attempt to stop them by running out the round clock, killing all Terrorists, or defusing the explosive. In a hostage rescue match, the Counter-Terrorist team act as the attackers, attempting to rescue non-player character "hostages" that the Terrorist team are defending. At the start of each round, players are able to purchase different weapons and equipment. A standard match ends when a team wins thirteen rounds.

The game features two primary matchmaking modes: Competitive and Premier, both of which were previously featured in Global Offensive. Competitive is a direct continuation of Global Offensive's matchmaking system; players can choose to play any map, and ranks are now determined on a per-map basis. Premier plays similarly to Competitive, but instead of allowing the players to queue into any individual map, Premier uses a seven-map pool with a voting and banning system. It also follows a revised ranking system, whereby—in lieu of Global Offensive's ranking system, which grouped players into eighteen different skill ranks—players are given a numerical rating based on their performance.

Supplementing Counter-Strike 2's main game modes are six additional modes: Wingman, Casual, Deathmatch, Arms Race, Retakes, and Rush. Wingman is a bomb defusal match, but with only two players per team, one bombsite, and matches ending after a team wins nine rounds. Casual is another bomb defusal mode, but with no ranking system and an increase in the number of players on each team. Deathmatch puts players into a match with no map objective, where players try to achieve the most kills before the match ends. Arms Race plays very differently from other modes, featuring no money system or menu to buy weapons. Instead, players are given new weapons after successive kills, with the weapons progressively becoming less powerful and more difficult. The first player to get kills with all weapons, including a final knife kill, wins the game. Retakes is a revised bomb defusal mode, in which three Terrorists must defend an active bombsite from four Counter-Terrorists; the first team to win eight rounds wins the match. Rush puts two teams of three against each other on a randomly selected map, tasking them with taking control of a small tower on the map.

== Development ==
A comparison between the Global Offensive version of de_nuke (top, using Source) and the Counter-Strike 2 version (bottom, using Source 2), demonstrating the game's improvements to lighting and switch to physically based materials

Valve developed Counter-Strike 2 with the Source 2 game engine as an update to Counter-Strike: Global Offensive (2012). Various aspects of Global Offensive were updated during development to use the features of Source 2. It is the first entry in the Counter-Strike series in over ten years. In addition to the engine changes, the game was developed alongside new server architecture, allowing for "sub-tick" gameplay that more accurately synchronizes with player input. Mike Morasky also composed new music for Counter-Strike 2; a soundtrack album was released to digital platforms by Ipecac Recordings on November 1, 2023.

Many maps from Global Offensive were given upgrades to take advantage of the features of Source 2, including new lighting and physically based materials. Valve created three different groups to place maps into when reconstructing them: "Touchstone" for maps that were unchanged in layout (ex. Dust II), "Upgrades" for maps given large-scale graphical upgrades with the features of Source 2 (ex. Nuke), and "Overhauls" for maps reconstructed from the ground up (ex. Inferno). Additionally, all cosmetic items from Global Offensive, including weapon skins and knives, were transferred to Counter-Strike 2.

== Release ==
Following rumors of a Source 2 update for Global Offensive earlier that month, Counter-Strike 2 was officially announced on March 22, 2023, and three videos demonstrating changes made from Global Offensive were released. Later that day, a "Limited Test" version of Counter-Strike 2 was released to select Global Offensive players. Throughout the existence of the Limited Test, new aspects of the game were made available for testing via updates, including upgraded maps, the revised weapon loadout system, and new authoring tools that allow players to design custom maps, weapon skins, and stickers. On September 1, 2023, the Limited Test was released to all that purchased Global Offensive before it became free-to-play in 2018 and were active in competitive matchmaking.

Counter-Strike 2 released to the public on September 27, 2023, replacing Global Offensive on Steam. This took Global Offensive down, with the exception of community servers, which are accessible via a "legacy" branch of Global Offensive. Several features from Global Offensive were removed, including the "Arms Race" and "Danger Zone" game modes, various multiplayer maps, such as Train and Cache, and all 167 in-game achievements. Support for the macOS operating system and older hardware configurations, including DirectX 9 and 32-bit operating systems, was also discontinued, with Counter-Strike 2 being only available on 64-bit Windows and Linux systems.

Post-release, Valve is supporting Counter-Strike 2 with updates, which add playable content and features to the game, including game modes, maps, and Steam Workshop support, and reworks to existing features, such as the game's animation system; map additions include new, community-developed maps, and revamped versions of Train and Cache. Valve also intends to introduce new weapons to Counter-Strike 2 in future updates.

=== Monetization ===
As with Global Offensive, Counter-Strike 2 employs a free-to-play model; players are able to access the majority of the game's contents without paying an up-front fee, with the exception of the Premier game mode, access to which requires the purchase of a "Prime Status" upgrade. Players who choose to purchase the Prime upgrade also obtain access to a weekly "care package", which they earn via gaining experience points (XP). Upon earning a care package, players are presented with four rewards, which can include weapon skins, weapon cases (i.e loot boxes), and graffiti sprays, and must select two of these rewards. Additionally, players can acquire cosmetic items through the Steam Community Market or via "The Armory"—a battle pass-style progression system, which allows players to earn "Armory credits" and redeem them in the Armory for various items, including weapon cases, weapon skins, stickers, and weapon charms.

According to reports from Eurogamer and Dot Esports, Counter-Strike 2 generated an estimated US$1 billion in revenue through the sale of loot boxes by the end of 2023, with a total of over 400 million loot boxes being opened throughout the entirety of that year.

== Reception ==
=== Critical reception ===
Reception

Aggregate scores
Aggregator	Score
Metacritic	82/100
OpenCritic	88% recommend

Review scores
Publication	Score
Edge	9/10
Eurogamer	4/5
Hardcore Gamer	4/5
PCGamesN	8/10
Shacknews	9/10
TechRadar	4/5

Counter-Strike 2 received "generally favorable reviews", according to the review aggregator website Metacritic, which calculated a weighted average rating of 82/100, based on 16 critic reviews. OpenCritic determined that 88% of critics recommended the game.

Jake Tucker of TechRadar gave Counter-Strike 2 a 4 out of 5 star rating; Tucker praised the game's "clean" gunplay and "silken" movement, but criticized its hostility to new players and lack of accessibility features. Eurogamer's Will Judd also gave the game a 4 out of 5 star rating, commending its moment-to-moment gunplay and overhauled maps, but critiquing its stability and lack of alternative game modes that deviate from its focus on competitive play. Chris Shive of Hardcore Gamer stated that Counter-Strike 2 is a "mostly positive update to Global Offensive", and gave it a 4/5 rating.

Polygon's Charlie Theel called Counter-Strike 2 "a significant move forward for the franchise", praising the game's changes to weapon handling, visuals, sound design and art direction. Ed Thorn, reviews editor for Rock Paper Shotgun, stated that Counter-Strike 2 "captures what makes Counter-Strike tick", though he noted that the game's foundation seemed "a little sparse and a touch shaky" upon its initial release but felt confident that Valve "have an FPS that'll supersede Global Offensive in time." PC Gamer's Rich Stanton commented that his transition to Counter-Strike 2 from Global Offensive felt like playing a "director's cut" version of something he'd already played before, rather than a new experience.

=== Audience reception ===
Initial responses from players were critical of the removal of several game modes that were present in Global Offensive, such as Arms Race and Danger Zone, the discontinuation of Global Offensive's support for the macOS operating system, and the removal of all in-game achievements. Due to the removed content, the game received thousands of negative reviews on Steam, most of which were hidden by the 7.5 million reviews previously made for Global Offensive, the majority of which were positive. Graham Smith of Rock Paper Shotgun commented that Counter-Strike 2 should not have been able to use reviews from Global Offensive to prop itself up as the two were different games, and that if user reviews only included those for Counter-Strike 2, the store page would show a mixed feedback from players, equivalent to 59%. In October 2023, PCGamesN and Den of Geek reported that Counter-Strike 2 had become the lowest-rated Valve release on Steam, with the game's performance and removed content being considered primary criticisms from players.

=== Accolades ===
Awards and nominations for Counter-Strike 2
Date	Award	Category	Result	Ref.
November 10, 2023	Golden Joystick Awards	Still Playing Award	Nominated	
December 7, 2023	The Game Awards	Best Esports Game	Nominated	
November 21, 2024	Golden Joystick Awards	Still Playing Award – PC and Console	Nominated	
December 12, 2024	The Game Awards	Best Esports Game	Nominated	
December 11, 2025	The Game Awards	Best Esports Game	Won	
December 10, 2026	The Game Awards	Best Esports Game	Pending	
