= ApEX (Counter-Strike) =

French professional Counter-Strike player

apEX
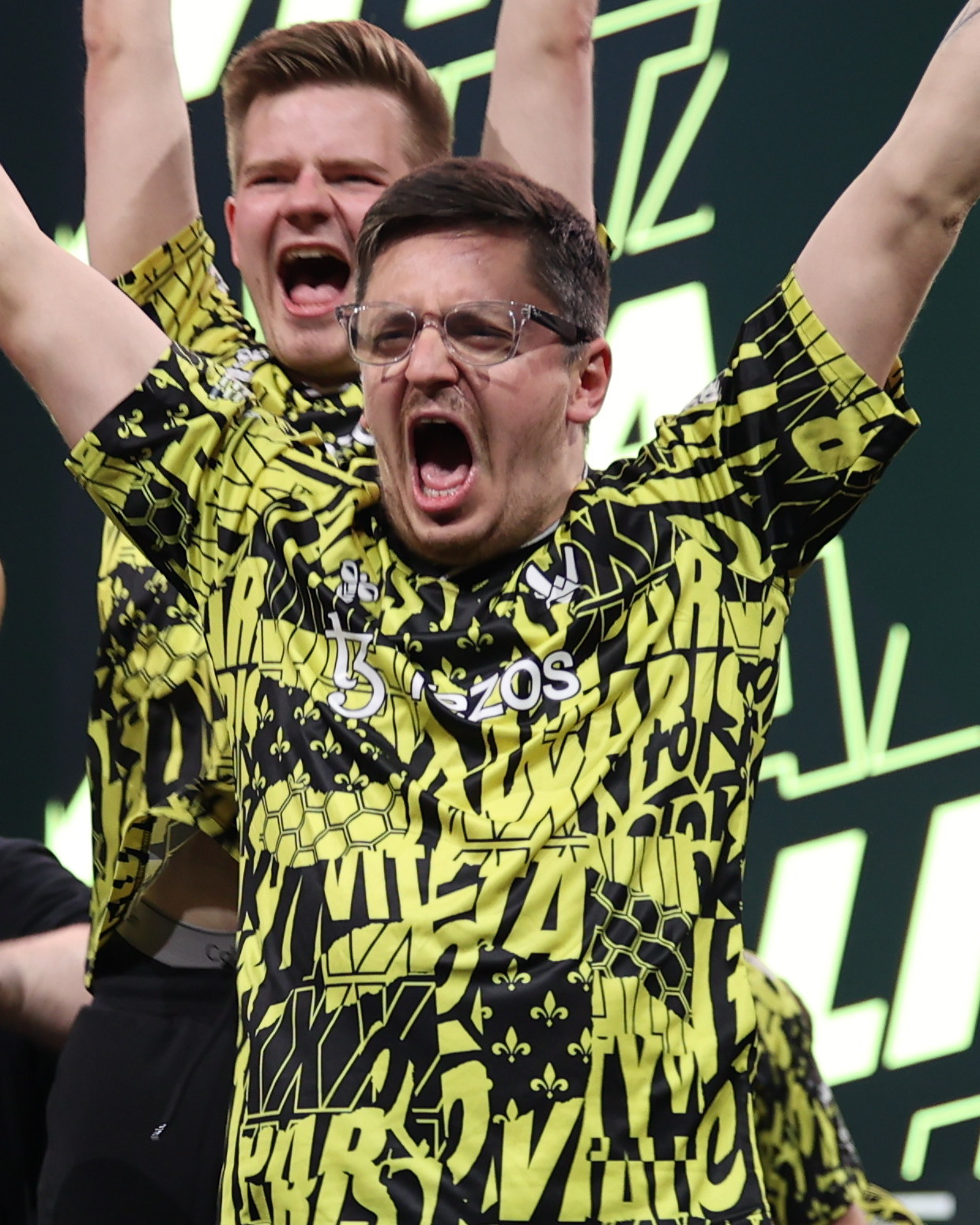
- ApEX during Vitality's victory at Blast Paris Major 2023

Personal information
- Name: Dan Madesclaire
- Born: 22 February 1993 (age 33), Charmes, Vosges, France

Current team
- Team: Vitality
- Role: IGL/Rifler

Team history
- 2012-2013: eXtensive
- 2013: LDLC
- 2013-2014: Clan-Mystik
- 2014: LDLC
- 2014-2015: Titan
- 2015-2017: EnVyUs
- 2017-2018: G2
- 2018-present: Vitality

Career highlights and awards
- 4× Major champion (Cluj-Napoca 2015, Paris 2023, Austin 2025, Budapest 2025); 2× ESL Grand Slam champion (Season 5, Season 6); 2× HLTV Player of the Year (2014, 2015)

Dan Madesclaire, better known as apEX, is a professional Counter-Strike player who currently plays for Team Vitality. He is widely considered to be one of the greatest in-game leaders in Counter-Strike history.

== Career ==
=== Early years and Counter-Strike: Source ===
Madesclaire was born in Charmes, Vosges in 1993, he was 14 when he first played Counter-Strike after being invited by his friend. Madesclaire began playing Counter-Strike at a high level in 2008 when he attended his first LAN tournament at age 15. He continued to attend a couple french LAN tournaments a year until 2011, when he began to see some success in France and abroad. In April 2011, Madesclaire and 3DMAX placed 3rd in the Counter-Strike: Source tournament of the Copenhagen Games, a multi-game tournament. Later in the year, playing for LDLC OL, Madesclaire placed 5-6th in the Source tournament at ESWC 2011. Madesclaire joined VeryGames at the beginning of 2012, where the team saw great success, with numerous tournament wins towards the end of Counter-Strike: Source.

=== Transition to Counter-Strike: Global Offensive ===
Madesclaire left VeryGames in the middle of 2012 and remained with Team eXtensive until the end of the year. He joined LDLC in early 2013 and played with moderate success, leaving the team in August of that year to join Clan-Mystik. It was with Mystik that Madesclaire played at his first Major at DreamHack Winter 2013, with the team receiving a direct invite to the event. Mystik won their first match at the event, before losing the next two to exit the tournament in 9th-12th place. Madesclaire would remain with Mystik until February 2014.

=== 2014-2015 ===
After leaving Mystik, Madesclaire joined LDLC again, early enough in the year to attend EMS One Katowice 2014, where he and the team finished in the top 8. The team would experience some success heading into the second major of 2014, ESL One Cologne 2014. They would beat the champions of the previous major, Virtus.Pro before losing to Ninjas in Pyjamas in the semifinals. After the Cologne major, the first of the "French shuffles" would occur, with Madesclaire moving from LDLC to Titan. This move would prove unfortunate for Madesclaire as one of his teammates, Hovik "KQLY" Tovmassian would receive a VAC ban, with the team being barred from the final major championship of the year as a result. Despite this, Madesclaire performed very well in 2014, being ranked the 15th best player in the world by HLTV, citing his skill as an entry fragger and high form throughout the year. Madesclaire remained with Titan going into 2015, where he and the team remained competitive and earning another shot at the major by passing through the LAN qualifier. The team would not see success after qualification, exiting ESL One Katowice 2015 in last place, losing to the previous champions in their opening match of the tournament. Titan would win one LAN after their major run, but results would dip as the year went on, with Madesclaire leaving the team in July of 2015. Madesclaire would join Team EnVyUs and immediately see success, winning a tournament and reaching 2nd place at the second major of the year, ESL One Cologne 2015. Both Madesclaire and the team continued in their success for some time, winning numerous high tier tournaments with EnVy, culminating in Madesclaire's first win at a major tournament at DreamHack Open Cluj-Napoca 2015. Madesclaire would again be listed on the HLTV top 20, being ranked at 18th due to his achievements with both Titan and Envy.

=== 2016-2017 ===
The start of 2016 would prove to be mixed, with an early tournament win in february followed by two group stage exits. Envy's prospects would continue to sour after a last place finish at MLG Major Championship: Columbus, losing to the American team CLG in their opening match, then losing to the CIS team Gambit. Madesclaire and Envy would secure passage to the next major, but would again exit in last place. There would be some scattered success throughout the rest of the year, with the team achieving a spot at the upcoming Atlanta major, additionally the team would move through their regional and continental qualifiers to reach WESG 2016. In the main event, the team would top their group and move through the playoff bracket, winning in the grand finals and receiving the $800,000 prize. The team would next attend ELEAGUE Major 2017 and narrowly miss out on playoffs, the lineup would change after the major, with Madeslcaire and two of his Envy teammates joining G2. The new team would take some time to get in form, but they would eventually perform well in the run up to the second major of 2017, winning a top tier tournament just a few weeks before PGL Major Kraków 2017. Madesclaire's major misfortune would continue, narrowly missing out on playoffs again after going 2-3 in the group stage, but due to majors moving from 16 to 24 teams after Kraków, G2 would be guaranteed a spot in the next major. The team would rebound in September, winning another top tier LAN in Sweden, before settling into more mixed results for the remainder of the year.

=== 2018-2019 ===
The first event of the year for G2 would be the ELEAGUE Major: Boston 2018 where they would perform well, passing through the first and second group stage in 3-0 fashion to reach the playoffs, Madesclaire's first time in the playoffs since the Cluj-Napoca major. Their time in the playoffs would be short however as they would lose to the eventual champions, Cloud9, exiting in 5th-8th place. G2 would take a dip in form, unable to achieve any real success, the team would only reach the playoffs of one other event after the major. Madesclaire was benched from G2 in June, and would sit out the second major of 2018, having to wait until October to move to his next team, Team Vitality. Vitality would be composed of four veteran players of the French scene in Madesclaire, Nathan "NBK-" Schmitt, Vincent "Happy" Schopenhauer, and Cédric "RpK" Guipouy. To round off this new team, a young and talented French player would serve as the star player, Mathieu "Zywoo" Herbaut. The results began slow, as the completely new lineup had to qualify to every top tier event, their first steps towards the top would be taken as they would qualify to, and later win, a DreamHack event. After this, they would qualify to the minor championship in order to reach the upcoming IEM Katowice Major 2019. Vitality would end 2018 with the benching of Happy, and the introduction of Alexander "Alex" McMeekin. The updated roster would be tested immediately into 2019 as Vitality would play in a qualifier, then the minor in January, which they would pass through both successfully. Madesclaire and Vitality would perform in the group stages, passing through the first stage 3-1 before narrowly missing out on playoffs after going 2-3 in the second group stage. Vitality and Madesclaire would begin to live up to expectations after the major, qualifying to ESL One Cologne 2019, winning numerous high tier tournaments, and winning the team's first top tier trophy at Esports Championship Series Season 7. Vitality would end up in the grand finals of ESL One Cologne 2019, but would fail to prevent a dominant Team Liquid from winning and claiming the Intel Grand Slam. Later on in the year, Vitality would have another shot at the major at StarLadder Major: Berlin 2019, where they would reach the playoffs after successfully navigating both group stages, but would exit the major in 5th-8th place. Vitality and Madesclaire would end 2019 by winning one more top-tier LAN at Epicenter 2019, ending Vitality's first full year in Counter-Strike.

=== 2020-2021 ===
At the beginning of 2020, Madesclaire and Vitality would attend two LAN tournaments, but would not see success at either. After this, the Counter-Strike scene would be forced to transition to online play exclusively due to the COVID-19 pandemic, with the planned IEM Rio major being delayed, then cancelled. In March, the captain of Vitality, Alex "ALEX" McMeekin, would leave the team due to burnout, leaving the team without a leader. Madesclaire, who served as an entry for most of his career, would take the reins as the new in-game leader for Vitality. Madesclaire would be put to the test only a few weeks after moving to his new role at ESL Pro League Season 11: Europe, where the team would not make it to stage 2 of the event. Madesclaire and Vitality would soon stabilize and find success, remaining a top 5 team for the rest of the year and picking up two top tier tournaments in back to back fashion. The beginning of 2021 would prove to be tumultuous as Madesclaire would take a short break in February, but would be back in the server less than a week and a half later. The team would continue to struggle to find results until the latter part of the year, reaching 3rd-4th place at a tournament in July and 2nd in a tournament in September. Vitality would be in high form in the run up to the first major since 2019, PGL Major Stockholm 2021. The team would begin their major run in stage 2, but would lose both of their opening matches, before rebounding and attain a group stage score of 3-2, reaching the playoffs. Vitality would face NAVI in the quarter-finals and lose 0-2, exiting the major in 5th-8th place. The team would remain competitive, winning a tournament, and placing 2nd and 3rd in top tier tournaments towards the end of 2021. With the end of the year came the news that Vitality, a French speaking team up until this point, would be going international with the signing of the Astralis trio of Peter "dupreeh" Rasmussen, Emil "Magisk" Reif, and coach Danny "zonic" Sørensen.

=== 2022-2023 ===
Madesclaire and Vitality, with the introduction of the Danes, would take some time to reach their full potential. After a good start to the year at BLAST Premier: Spring Groups 2022, Vitality would struggle throughout the first half of 2022, unable to reach the playoffs of any events until June. The team would make it through the qualification event to reach PGL Major Antwerp 2022, and would do well in stage 1, but would go 2-3 in stage 2 and exit the major. The team would round out the season with a second place finish against Natus Vincere at BLAST Premier: Spring Finals 2022. After the mid-season player break, Vitality would bench French rifler Kévin "misutaaa" Rabier and bring in the Israeli rifler Lotan "Spinx" Giladi. Success would come quickly, as the team would take first place at ESL Pro League Season 16, taking down Team Liquid in the finals. After this, results would skew downwards for the rest of the season, exiting in stage 2 of the major and not reaching any playoffs for the remainder of 2022. The beginning of 2023 would prove much more successful than previous years, with the team reaching the playoffs of two events in February and March. The team and Madesclaire would have high expectations heading into the qualifiers for the only major of the year, Blast Paris Major 2023. This major would be especially important, as it was the organization's and Madesclaire's home major, as it took place in France, it would also be the last major played on Counter-Strike: Global Offensive. The team would move through the qualifier 3-1, then beating G2, then Monte to get a direct invite to Stage 2. After the qualifiers, Vitality would go to IEM Rio 2023 and take 1st place, taking down Heroic 2-0. Vitality would pass through stage 2 with ease, going 3-0, they would then win against Into The Breach, Apeks, and finally Gamerlegion to win the Paris major without dropping a map, allowing Madesclaire and Vitality to lift a major trophy on French soil. The team would reach 2nd at an event after the major before going into the player break. During the break, the team would bench dupreeh to sign Israeli rifler Shahar "flameZ" Shushan. The team, now with flameZ in tow, would impress immediately, reaching 3rd-4th at IEM Cologne 2023 and winning Gamers8 2023. After this, Counter-Strike: Global Offensive would be replaced by Counter-Strike 2, and Madesclaire, Vitality, and the Counter-Strike esports scene would need to transition to the new title. Vitality would bomb out of their first CS2 event in last place, and would then bring in William "mezii" Merriman, as Magisk would be departing the team. The team would find quick success, winning Blast Premier: Fall Final 2023 and BLAST Premier: World Final 2023. For their results in 2023, Vitality and Madesclaire would receive multiple accolades. HLTV would name Vitality as the team of the year and would name Madesclaire as the In-Game Leader of the year, multiple other Vitality players would either receive nominations for their categories or win them outright.

=== 2024-Present ===
Vitality would begin 2024 with a successful run in the BLAST Premier groups, but would stumble and exit IEM Katowice 2024 in 15th-16th place. A few weeks later, Vitality would pass through the qualifiers for PGL Major Copenhagen 2024, the first major played in Counter-Strike 2, in 3-1 fashion. The team would qualify directly to stage 2 and pass through again successfully, going 3-1 in the group stage, reaching the playoffs. They would meet Cloud9 in the quarter finals and would win 2-0, their next match would be against FaZe Clan where they would lose 1-2 and receive 3rd-4th place. After a three week break, Vitality would compete in ESL Pro League Season 19 where they would top their group and make it to the grand finals, losing to MOUZ. Madesclaire would then participate in a local French LAN with other veteran French players and reach 3rd place with the mix team. Madesclaire and Vitality would again fall short of success at IEM Dallas 2024, losing in the grand finals to G2, the team would fail to make a grand final for the rest of the spring season. Madesclaire and Vitality would find success at the second tournament of the fall season, winning IEM Cologne 2024. After their successful Cologne run however, the team would go without reaching a grand finals for the rest of the year, though the team remained competitive. Vitality would pass through the qualifier for the second major of 2024, Perfect World Shanghai Major 2024 3-0 and would pass through the group stage 3-0 as well, before falling to FaZe Clan in the quarter finals, ending 2024 for Vitality. The team would be ranked as the 4th best team of the year by HLTV, but the team would need to make a change as Spinx would leave the team. The team would find their match as they would sign Robin "ropz" Kool in January 2025, acquiring the Estonian star player on a free transfer. Vitality would not need to wait long as they would be tested only 14 days into 2025, where they would reach the playoffs of the first event of the year, although they would lose in the quarter finals. Undeterred, Vitality would go into IEM Katowice with high expectations, these expectations would be met as the team cruised through the group stage, then the playoffs, defeating Team Spirit 3-0 in the grand final, only losing a single map in the tournament. In March, Vitality would begin their run at ESL Pro League Season 21 and again rush through the tournament, defeating MOUZ in the grand finals. Vitality would continue their reign of terror, winning BLAST Open Lisbon 2025 by beating MOUZ in 3-2 fashion. Vitality's next event would be IEM Melbourne 2025, an event with extra significance as, if the team won they would achieve the ESL Grand Slam, an award for winning ESL run 4 events in a 10 event time frame to win a $1,000,000 prize. The team would move through the event with ease, facing Team Falcons in the grand final. The final would be a back and forth affair, with each team trading map picks forcing a 5th map, Vitality would win in overtime on the map Nuke, taking the tournament and winning the Grand Slam. This win would make Madesclaire and Vitality the fifth team in history to win the Grand Slam. Vitality would go on to win the next two tournaments they attended without losing a match, at BLAST Rivals 2025 Season 1 and IEM Dallas 2025. After Dallas, Vitality would head to the Blast Austin Major 2025 as heavy favorites, but the team would stumble in their first match, losing to Brazilian team Legacy, breaking the team's 30 match win streak. After this, Vitality would recover and go 3-1 in stage 2 and reach the playoffs where they would play Navi, MOUZ, and finally The Mongolz in the grand final, where they would win 2-1, winning the organization's second Major championship. After the mid-season break, Vitality would be unable to recreate the success of the first half of the year, reaching the top four of the next four tournaments without winning any. The team would find their form in ESL Pro League Season 22, defeating Team Falcons 3-0 and winning the tournament. After this the team would reach 2nd, then 3rd-4th in the next two tournaments they would attend. Finally, Madesclaire and Vitality would head to the final tournament of 2025, the StarLadder Budapest Major 2025. Vitality would begin with a group stage loss to FaZe before recovering and going 3-1 in stage 3, securing a playoffs spot. For their first playoffs match, they would defeat The MongolZ, followed by Team Spirit, reaching the grand finals where they would play against FaZe. After a loss on the first map, Vitality would dominate the rest of the finals, winning three maps in a row to win the second major of the year. With the win at the Major, Madesclaire matches all members of the former Astralis core, barring dupreeh, in the amount of majors won at four. For their results in 2025, Madesclaire and Vitality would be showered with accolades, the Vitality Counter-Strike 2 team would win team of the year at The Game Awards 2025, The Esports Awards 2025, and would be named the team of the year by HLTV. Madesclaire would also receive the in-game leader of the year by HLTV, becoming the only player to receive the award twice thus far, and numerous other players on Vitality would receive awards for their roles. Vitality would make no changes heading into 2026 and would continue in high form, reaching 3rd-4th in the first tournament of the year. Vitality would seem to repeat the pattern of 2025 by taking first at IEM Kraków 2026 over Furia. Vitality would continue to dominate, winning at PGL Cluj-Napoca 2026, BLAST Open Spring 2026, and at IEM Rio 2026. At IEM Rio, Vitality would make a successful run through the group stage, despite losing to Falcons in the upper bracket final. After this, Vitality defeated Navi, Furia, and finally Spirit to claim the title, along with the ESL Grand Slam, with Vitality being the first team to win back-to-back Grand Slams. Vitality then went to BLAST Rivals Spring 2026, where they would triumph over Navi to take the tournament, though they would lose to Navi in the next tournament IEM Atlanta.

== Notable Tournament Results ==
Bold denotes a Counter-Strike Major.
Year	Place	Tournament	Team	Winning Score	Opponent	Prize Money	Awards	Ref
2026	1st	ESL Pro League Season 24	Vitality	3:0	Mouz	$295,000		
2026	1st	StarLadder StarSeries Fall 2026	Vitality	3:1	Aurora Gaming	$100,000		
2026	1st	BLAST Rivals Fort Worth 2026	Vitality	3:0	Natus Vincere	$125,000		
2026	1st	IEM Rio 2026	Vitality	3:0	Team Spirit	$125,000		
2026	1st	BLAST Open Rotterdam 2026	Vitality	3:0	Natus Vincere	$150,000		
2026	1st	PGL Cluj-Napoca 2026	Vitality	3:0	PARIVISION	$225,000		
2026	1st	IEM Kraków 2026	Vitality	3:1	Furia Esports	$400,000		
2025	1st	**StarLadder Budapest Major 2025**	Vitality	3:1	FaZe Clan	$500,000		
2025	1st	ESL Pro League Season 22	Vitality	3:0	Falcons	$100,000		
2025	1st	**BLAST Austin Major 2025**	Vitality	2:1	The Mongolz	$500,000		
2025	1st	IEM Dallas 2025	Vitality	3:0	MOUZ	$125,000		
2025	1st	BLAST Rivals 2025 Season 1	Vitality	3:2	Falcons	$125,000		
2025	1st	IEM Melbourne 2025	Vitality	3:2	Falcons	$125,000		
2025	1st	BLAST Open Lisbon 2025	Vitality	3:2	MOUZ	$150,000		
2025	1st	ESL Pro League Season 21	Vitality	3:0	MOUZ	$100,000		
2025	1st	IEM Katowice 2025	Vitality	3:0	Team Spirit	$400,000		
2024	1st	IEM Cologne 2024	Vitality	3:1	Natus Vincere	$400,000		
2023	1st	BLAST Premier: World Final 2023	Vitality	2:0	FaZe Clan	$500,000		
2023	1st	Gamers8 2023	Vitality	2:1	ENCE	$400,000		
2023	1st	**BLAST Paris Major 2023**	Vitality	2:0	GamerLegion	$500,000		
2019	1st	EPICENTER 2019	Vitality	2:1	Mousesports	$250,000		
2017	1st	ESL Pro League Season 5	G2	3:1	North	$225,000		
2017	1st	World Electronic Sports Games 2016	EnvyUs	2:0	Kinguin	$800,000		
2015	1st	**DreamHack Open Cluj-Napoca 2015**	EnvyUs	2:0	Natus Vincere	$100,000		
