= IEM Rio Major 2022 =

Esports tournament

IEM Rio 2022
- 2022
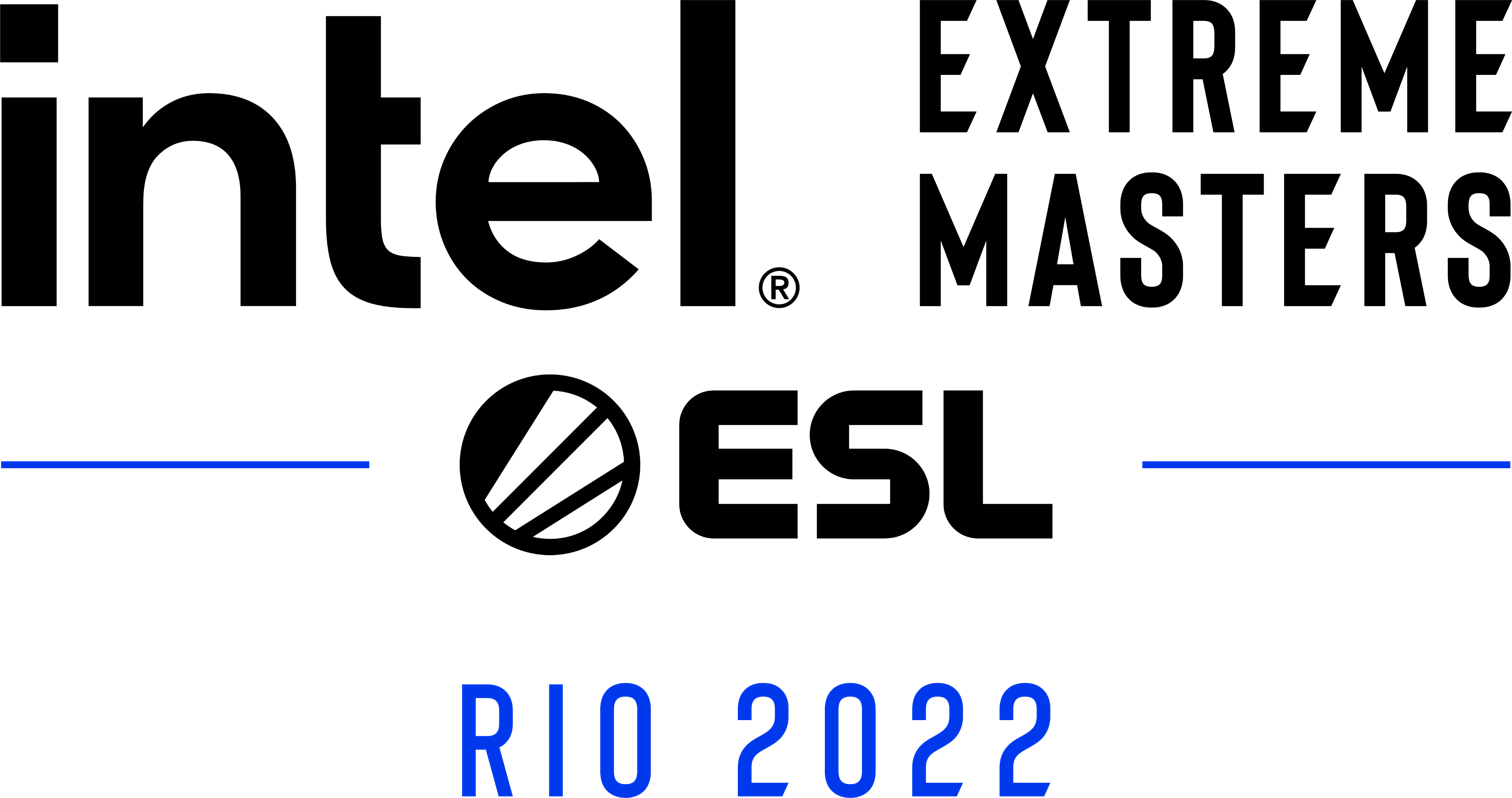

Tournament information
- Game: Counter-Strike: Global Offensive
- Location: Rio de Janeiro, Brazil
- Date: October 31 – November 13, 2022
- Administrator: Valve; ESL
- Tournament format(s): Two 16 team Swiss-system group stages 8 team Single-elimination playoff
- Venue: Challengers and Legends Stages: Riocentro Arena Champions Stage: Jeunesse Arena
- Teams: 24
- Defending champions: FaZe Clan
- Purse: US$1,250,000
- Website: pro.eslgaming.com/tour/csgo/rio/

Final positions
- Champions: Outsiders (Note: Due to sanctions against Russia in response to the 2022 Russian invasion of Ukraine, Virtus.pro competed under a neutral name.)
- 1st runners-up: Heroic
- 2nd runners-up: MOUZ; Furia Esports
- MVP: Dzhami "Jame" Ali

The Intel Extreme Masters Season XVII – Rio Major 2022, also known as IEM Rio Major 2022 or Rio 2022, was the eighteenth Counter-Strike: Global Offensive Major Championship. It was held in Rio de Janeiro, Brazil, between October 31 and November 13, 2022. Outsiders won the Major, defeating Heroic in the grand final 2–0.

== Background ==
The Major was originally scheduled to take place from May 11 to May 24, 2020. However, due to the COVID-19 pandemic, Valve and ESL postponed the Major to November. Because Valve usually sponsors two Majors per year, the delayed Major was to have a US$2,000,000 prize pool, making it the largest prize pool in CS:GO Major history. In September 2020, Valve and ESL announced that the Major was canceled because of continued complications from the COVID-19 outbreak in Brazil. In January 2021, Valve announced that PGL Major Stockholm 2021 would be the next Major instead.

On September 15, 2021, ESL published the 2022 ESL Pro Tour Road Map, announcing its intention to host a Major in Rio. On January 25, 2022, Dexerto reported that ESL was planning to host the second major of 2022 in Rio de Janeiro. ESL announced the Intel Extreme Masters Rio Major 2022 on May 24, 2022. This was the first ever Major hosted in Brazil, and tickets sold out in less than an hour.

The defending Major Champions were FaZe Clan, who won their first major championship at PGL Major Antwerp 2022. They were eliminated in the Legends Stage after their loss to Bad News Eagles.

== Format ==
=== Map Pool ===
- Dust II
- Mirage
- Inferno
- Nuke
- Ancient
- Overpass
- Vertigo

== Teams ==
Legends

- FaZe Clan
- Natus Vincere
- Ninjas in Pyjamas
- ENCE
- Sprout
- Heroic
- Team Spirit
- Team Liquid

Challengers

- OG
- Team Vitality
- Evil Geniuses
- Cloud9
- BIG Clan
- Bad News Eagles
- MOUZ
- 9z Team

Contenders

- Team GamerLegion
- Outsiders
- 00 Nation
- Furia Esports
- Fnatic
- Imperial Esports
- IHC Esports
- Grayhound Gaming

== Challengers Stage ==
Pos	Team	W	L	RW	RL	RD	BH	Qualification
1	MOUZ	3	0	73	49	+24	1	Qualification to Legends Stage
2	Bad News Eagles	3	0	64	30	+34	-2	Qualification to Legends Stage
3	Outsiders	3	1	70	55	+15	3	Qualification to Legends Stage
4	BIG Clan	3	1	81	57	+24	2	Qualification to Legends Stage
5	Furia Esports	3	1	83	61	+22	-3	Qualification to Legends Stage
6	Fnatic	3	2	115	128	-13	4	Qualification to Legends Stage
7	Team Vitality	3	2	111	100	+11	-5	Qualification to Legends Stage
8	Cloud9	3	2	139	114	+25	-7	Qualification to Legends Stage
9	Team GamerLegion	2	3	94	112	-18	6	Eliminated
10	OG	2	3	118	106	+12	0	Eliminated
11	9z Team	2	3	85	111	-26	-3	Eliminated
12	Grayhound Gaming	1	3	48	81	-33	3	Eliminated
13	Evil Geniuses	1	3	59	76	-17	1	Eliminated
14	IHC Esports	1	3	98	112	-14	-4	Eliminated
15	00 Nation	0	3	57	84	-27	3	Eliminated
16	Imperial Esports	0	3	54	73	-19	1	Eliminated

Updated to match(es) played on 3 November 2022. Source: HLTV

== Legends Stage ==
Pos	Team	W	L	RW	RL	RD	BH	Qualification
1	Cloud9	3	0	64	46	+18	0	Qualification to Champions Stage
2	Furia Esports	3	0	64	34	+30	-1	Qualification to Champions Stage
3	Heroic	3	1	87	78	+9	6	Qualification to Champions Stage
4	Outsiders	3	1	73	62	+11	1	Qualification to Champions Stage
5	Fnatic	3	1	66	57	+9	-3	Qualification to Champions Stage
6	Team Spirit	3	2	119	96	+23	0	Qualification to Champions Stage
7	Natus Vincere	3	2	117	88	+29	-3	Qualification to Champions Stage
8	MOUZ	3	2	102	97	+5	-3	Qualification to Champions Stage
9	BIG Clan	2	3	91	114	-23	5	Eliminated
10	Team Liquid	2	3	108	116	-8	3	Eliminated
11	ENCE	2	3	94	106	-8	2	Eliminated
12	Team Vitality	1	3	81	85	-4	-2	Eliminated
13	Bad News Eagles	1	3	76	116	-40	-2	Eliminated
14	Sprout	1	3	65	89	-24	-4	Eliminated
15	Ninjas in Pyjamas	0	3	50	64	-14	2	Eliminated
16	FaZe Clan	0	3	72	81	-9	-1	Eliminated

Updated to match(es) played on 8 November 2022. Source: HLTV

== Champions Stage ==
With eight teams remaining, the final stage of the Major is a single-elimination bracket, with all matches played as best-of-3 maps.

=== Bracket ===
Quarterfinals
1	Cloud9	16	13	9	1
8	MOUZ	11	16	16	2
5	Fnatic	11	8	–	0
4	Outsiders	16	16	–	2
3	Heroic	16	16	–	2
6	Team Spirit	8	14	–	0
2	Furia Esports	14	16	16	2
7	Natus Vincere	16	10	10	1

Semifinals
MOUZ	10	16	7	1
Outsiders	16	14	16	2
Heroic	6	19	16	2
Furia Esports	16	17	5	1

Finals
Outsiders	16	16	–	2
Heroic	12	5	–	0

== Final standings ==
The final placings are shown below. In addition, the prize distribution, seed for the next major, roster, and coaches are shown. Each team's in-game leader is shown first.

Place	Prize Money	Team	Seed	Roster	Coach
1st	US$500,000	Outsiders	Blast.tv Paris Major 2023 RMR	Jame, FL1T, fame, n0rb3r7, Qikert	dastan
2nd	US$170,000	Heroic	Blast.tv Paris Major 2023 RMR	cadiaN, TeSeS, jabbi, sjuush, stavn	Xizt
3rd – 4th	US$80,000	FURIA Esports	Blast.tv Paris Major 2023 RMR	arT, KSCERATO, drop, yuurih, saffee	André Akkari
3rd – 4th	US$80,000	MOUZ	Blast.tv Paris Major 2023 RMR	dexter, torzsi, JDC, xertioN, frozen	sycrone
5th – 8th	US$45,000	Team Spirit	Blast.tv Paris Major 2023 RMR	chopper, S1ren, w0nderful, magixx, Patsi	hally
5th – 8th	US$45,000	Cloud9	Blast.tv Paris Major 2023 RMR	nafany, sh1ro, Ax1Le, interz, Hobbit	groove
5th – 8th	US$45,000	Fnatic	Blast.tv Paris Major 2023 RMR	mezii, FASHR, nicoodoz, roeJ, KRIMZ	keita
5th – 8th	US$45,000	Natus Vincere	Blast.tv Paris Major 2023 RMR	electroNic, Perfecto, s1mple, b1t, sdy	B1ad3
9th – 11th	US$20,000	BIG	Blast.tv Paris Major 2023 RMR	tabseN, syrsoN, s1n, Krimbo, k1to	gob b
9th – 11th	US$20,000	Team Liquid	Blast.tv Paris Major 2023 RMR	nitr0, EliGE, oSee, NAF, YEKINDAR	daps
9th – 11th	US$20,000	ENCE	Blast.tv Paris Major 2023 RMR	Snappi, maden, SunPayus, valde, dycha	sAw
12th – 14th	US$20,000	Bad News Eagles	Blast.tv Paris Major 2023 RMR	SENER1, gxx-, sinnopsyy, rigoN, juanflatroo	stikle-
12th – 14th	US$20,000	Team Vitality	Blast.tv Paris Major 2023 RMR	apEX, ZywOo, dupreeh, Magisk, Spinx	zonic
12th – 14th	US$20,000	Sprout	Blast.tv Paris Major 2023 RMR	slaxz-, Staehr, lauNX, Zyphon, refrezh	BERRY
15th – 16th	US$20,000	FaZe Clan	Blast.tv Paris Major 2023 RMR	karrigan, rain, Twistzz, broky, ropz	RobbaN
15th – 16th	US$20,000	Ninjas in Pyjamas	Blast.tv Paris Major 2023 RMR	Aleksib, es3tag, REZ, hampus, Brollan	djL
17th – 19th	US$10,000	OG	–	nexa, degster, FlameZ, NEOFRAG, F1KU	ruggah
17th – 19th	US$10,000	Team GamerLegion	–	siuhy, iM, isak, Keoz, acoR	ashhh
17th – 19th	US$10,000	9z Team	–	dgt, max, dav1deuS, nqz, buda	zakk
20th – 22nd	US$10,000	Grayhound Gaming	–	INS, Liazz, aliStair, Sico, vexite	Kingfisher
20th – 22nd	US$10,000	IHC Esports	–	bLitz, Techno4K, kabal, sk0R, ANNIHILATION	maaRaa
20th – 22nd	US$10,000	Evil Geniuses	–	neaLaN, CeRq, HexT, autimatic, Brehze	Vorborg
23rd – 24th	US$10,000	00 Nation	–	TACO, TRY, coldzera, latto, dumau	cky
23rd – 24th	US$10,000	Imperial Esports	–	FalleN, fer, boltz, VINI, chelo	fnx
