= Blast Paris Major 2023 =

Esports tournament

BLAST.tv Paris Major 2023
- 2023

Tournament information
- Game: Counter-Strike: Global Offensive
- Location: Paris, France
- Dates: May 8–21, 2023
- Administrator: Valve; BLAST
- Tournament format(s): Two 16-team Swiss-system group stages 8-team single-elimination playoff
- Host: BLAST.tv
- Venue: Accor Arena
- Teams: 24
- Defending champions: Virtus.pro (Note: Due to sanctions against Russia in response to the 2022 Russian invasion of Ukraine, Virtus.pro competed under the neutral name Outsiders. On March 22, 2023, tournament organizers ESL and BLAST lifted the ban on Virtus.pro.)
- Purse: US$1,250,000

Final positions
- Champions: Team Vitality
- 1st runners-up: GamerLegion
- 2nd runners-up: Heroic; Apeks
- MVP: Mathieu "ZywOo" Herbaut

The BLAST.tv Paris Major 2023, also known as BLAST.tv Major 2023 or Paris 2023, was the nineteenth and final Counter-Strike: Global Offensive Major Championship. It was held in Paris, France at the Accor Arena from May 8 to 21, 2023. Twenty-four teams qualified for the event, which featured a US$1,250,000 prize pool, via regional major rankings. It is the first Major Championship tournament hosted by BLAST. Team Vitality won the major, defeating GamerLegion in the grand final 2–0.

== Background ==
Counter-Strike: Global Offensive (CS:GO) is a multiplayer first-person shooter video game developed by Hidden Path Entertainment and Valve Corporation. It is the fourth game in the Counter-Strike series. In professional CS:GO, the Valve-sponsored Majors are the most prestigious tournaments.

The defending Major champions were Virtus.pro, who won their second Major championship at IEM Rio Major 2022. Virtus.pro were eliminated by MOUZ during the European Major qualifiers, making them the first defending Major champions to fail to qualify for the following Major.

This event was the final Counter-Strike: Global Offensive Major tournament, with the game to be succeeded by Counter-Strike 2, and that game's first Major tournament set to be held in March 2024.

== Format ==
Twenty-four teams qualified for the tournament. Sixteen teams qualified for the Challengers Stage, while eight teams received a bye to the Legends Stage. In the Challengers Stage, 16 teams participated in a Swiss bracket. The top eight teams advanced and joined the eight teams that received a bye in the Legends stage. The top eight teams from the Legends stage advanced to the Champions stage. The Champions stage was a single-elimination tournament, where each match was a best-of-3.

Map pool

- Anubis
- Mirage
- Inferno
- Nuke
- Ancient
- Overpass
- Vertigo

== Teams ==
Legends

- Natus Vincere
- 9INE
- Furia Esports
- Fnatic
- Heroic
- Into The Breach
- Bad News Eagles
- Team Vitality

Challengers

- paiN Gaming
- GamerLegion
- Apeks
- OG
- G2 Esports
- FORZE
- Ninjas in Pyjamas
- Monte

Contenders

- MOUZ
- Team Liquid
- Grayhound Gaming
- Complexity Gaming
- The Mongolz
- Fluxo
- ENCE
- FaZe Clan

== Qualification ==
Qualification took place through 3 Regional Major Ranking (RMR) events to determine qualifications for the geographic regions. The 3 regions were Europe, the Americas and Asia. Each region received a certain number of places at the Major in Paris based on the performance of teams from the same region at the IEM Rio Major 2022.

The RMR tournaments took place in the following cities:

- European RMRs: Copenhagen, Denmark: April 6–9 (Group A) and April 11–15 (Group B)
- American RMR: Monterrey, Mexico: April 5–9
- Asian RMR: Ulaanbaatar, Mongolia: April 4–8

=== RMR Results ===
Region	Contenders	Challengers	Legends
Europe A	MOUZ	GamerLegion; Apeks; OG	Natus Vincere; Into The Breach; fnatic; Bad News Eagles
Europe B	ENCE	G2 Esports; FORZE; Ninjas in Pyjamas; Monte	Heroic; 9INE; Vitality
America	Team Liquid; Complexity Gaming; Fluxo	paiN Gaming	FURIA
Asia	Grayhound Gaming; The Mongolz	—N/a	
Last Chance Qualifier	FaZe	—N/a	

== Challengers Stage ==
Pos	Team	W	L	RW	RL	RD	Qualification
1	G2	3	0	64	34	+30	Qualification to Legends Stage
2	ENCE	3	0	76	52	+24	Qualification to Legends Stage
3	Apeks	3	1	91	80	+11	Qualification to Legends Stage
4	Ninjas in Pyjamas	3	1	76	65	+11	Qualification to Legends Stage
5	FaZe Clan	3	1	101	93	+8	Qualification to Legends Stage
6	Monte	3	2	110	92	+18	Qualification to Legends Stage
7	GamerLegion	3	2	126	110	+16	Qualification to Legends Stage
8	Team Liquid	3	2	133	107	+26	Qualification to Legends Stage
9	Grayhound Gaming	2	3	73	104	-31	Eliminated
10	paiN Gaming	2	3	107	109	-2	Eliminated
11	FORZE	2	3	94	100	-6	Eliminated
12	OG	1	3	75	86	-11	Eliminated
13	The MongolZ	1	3	62	75	-13	Eliminated
14	Complexity Gaming	1	3	43	75	-32	Eliminated
15	Fluxo	0	3	53	75	-22	Eliminated
16	MOUZ	0	3	37	64	-27	Eliminated

Updated to match(es) played on 11 May 2023. Source: BLAST.tv

== Legends Stage ==
Pos	Team	W	L	RW	RL	RD	Qualification
1	Heroic	3	0	75	56	+19	Qualification to Champions Stage
2	Vitality	3	0	64	49	+15	Qualification to Champions Stage
3	Team Liquid	3	1	106	86	+20	Qualification to Champions Stage
4	Monte	3	1	90	70	+20	Qualification to Champions Stage
5	GamerLegion	3	1	74	55	+19	Qualification to Champions Stage
6	Apeks	3	2	95	97	-2	Qualification to Champions Stage
7	Into The Breach	3	2	112	98	+14	Qualification to Champions Stage
8	Faze Clan	3	2	140	137	+3	Qualification to Champions Stage
9	Navi	2	3	94	137	-24	Eliminated
10	Fnatic	2	3	120	133	-13	Eliminated
11	Ninjas In Pyjamas	2	3	101	95	+6	Eliminated
12	ENCE	1	3	53	73	-20	Eliminated
13	G2 Esports	1	3	101	95	+6	Eliminated
14	Bad News Eagles	1	3	78	83	-5	Eliminated
15	9INE	0	3	40	64	-24	Eliminated
16	FURIA Esports	0	3	30	64	-34	Eliminated

Updated to match(es) played on 16 May 2023. Source: BLAST.tv

== Champions Stage ==
With eight teams remaining, the final stage of the Major was a single-elimination bracket, with all matches played as best-of-3 maps.

=== Bracket ===
Quarterfinals
1	Heroic	16	12	16	2
8	FaZe Clan	14	16	6	1
4	Monte	10	3	–	0
5	GamerLegion	16	16	–	2
3	Team Liquid	10	11	–	0
6	Apeks	16	16	–	2
2	Vitality	16	16	–	2
7	Into The Breach	11	12	–	0

Semifinals
Heroic	16	14	6	1
GamerLegion	13	16	16	2
Apeks	14	12	–	0
Vitality	16	16	–	2

Finals
GamerLegion	6	13	–	0
Vitality	16	16	–	2

=== Quarterfinals ===
Quarterfinals	May 18	Heroic	2	–	1	FaZe Clan	Paris, France
							AccorHotels Arena
		16	Nuke			14	
		12	Overpass			16	
		16	Mirage			6	

Quarterfinals	May 19	Monte	0	–	2	GamerLegion	Paris, France
							AccorHotels Arena
		10	Mirage			16	
		3	Overpass			16	
			~~Vertigo~~				

Quarterfinals	May 19	Team Liquid	0	–	2	Apeks	Paris, France
							AccorHotels Arena
		10	Ancient			16	
		11	Overpass			16	
			~~Anubis~~				

Quarterfinals	May 19	Team Vitality	2	–	0	Into The Breach	Paris, France
		Statistics					AccorHotels Arena
		16	Vertigo			11	
		16	Anubis			12	
			~~Mirage~~				

=== Semifinals ===
Semifinals 1	May 20	Heroic	1	–	2	GamerLegion	Paris, France
							AccorHotels Arena
		16	Ancient			13	
		14	Inferno			16	
		6	Mirage			16	

Semifinals 2	May 20	Apeks	0	–	2	Team Vitality	Paris, France
							AccorHotels Arena
		14	Mirage			16	
		12	Vertigo			16	
			~~Inferno~~				

=== Grand Final ===
Grand Final	May 21	GamerLegion	0	–	2	Team Vitality	Paris, France
							AccorHotels Arena
		6	Overpass			16	
		13	Nuke			16	
			~~Inferno~~				

== Final standings ==
The final placings are shown below. In addition, the prize distribution, seed for the next major, roster, and coaches are shown. Each team's in-game leader is shown first.

Place	Prize Money	Team	Seed	Roster	Coach
1st	US$500,000	Team Vitality	PGL Major Copenhagen 2024 RMR	apEX, ZywOo, dupreeh, Magisk, Spinx	zonic
2nd	US$170,000	GamerLegion	PGL Major Copenhagen 2024 RMR	siuhy, iM, acoR, isak, Keoz	ashhh
3rd – 4th	US$80,000	Apeks	PGL Major Copenhagen 2024 RMR	kyxsan, nawwk, jL, jkaem, STYKO	kuben
3rd – 4th	US$80,000	Heroic	PGL Major Copenhagen 2024 RMR	cadiaN, TeSeS, stavn, jabbi, sjuush	Xizt
5th – 8th	US$45,000	Team Liquid	PGL Major Copenhagen 2024 RMR	nitr0, EliGE, oSee, NAF, YEKINDAR	daps
5th – 8th	US$45,000	FaZe Clan	PGL Major Copenhagen 2024 RMR	karrigan, rain, Twistzz, broky, ropz	RobbaN
5th – 8th	US$45,000	Monte	PGL Major Copenhagen 2024 RMR	sdy, Woro2k, DemQQ, BOROS, kRaSnaL	–
5th – 8th	US$45,000	Into the Breach	PGL Major Copenhagen 2024 RMR	Thomas, CYPHER, volt, rallen, CRUC1AL	Juve
9th – 11th	US$20,000	Fnatic	PGL Major Copenhagen 2024 RMR	mezii, FASHR, KRIMZ, roeJ, nicoodoz	keita
9th – 11th	US$20,000	Natus Vincere	PGL Major Copenhagen 2024 RMR	electroNic, Perfecto, s1mple, b1t, npl	B1ad3
9th – 11th	US$20,000	Ninjas in Pyjamas	PGL Major Copenhagen 2024 RMR	Aleksib, k0nfig, REZ, Brollan, headtr1ck	djL
12th – 14th	US$20,000	G2 Esports	PGL Major Copenhagen 2024 RMR	HooXi, NiKo, huNter-, m0NESY, jks	Swani
12th – 14th	US$20,000	ENCE	PGL Major Copenhagen 2024 RMR	Snappi, dycha, NertZ, maden, SunPayus	sAw
12th – 14th	US$20,000	Bad News Eagles	PGL Major Copenhagen 2024 RMR	SENER1, gxx-, sinnopsyy, rigoN, juanflatroo	Devilwalk
15th – 16th	US$20,000	FURIA Esports	PGL Major Copenhagen 2024 RMR	arT, KSCERATO, yuurih, saffee, drop	guerri
15th – 16th	US$20,000	9INE	PGL Major Copenhagen 2024 RMR	mynio, Goofy, hades, KEi, Kylar	nawrot
17th – 19th	US$10,000	paiN Gaming	–	biguzera, hardzao, NEKIZ, skullz, zevy	bruno
17th – 19th	US$10,000	FORZE Esports	–	Jerry, zorte, shalfey, r3salt, Krad	Fierce
17th – 19th	US$10,000	Grayhound Gaming	–	INS, Sico, aliStair, Liazz, Vexite	–
20th – 22nd	US$10,000	Complexity Gaming	–	JT, hallzerk, FaNg, floppy, Grim	T.c
20th – 22nd	US$10,000	The MongolZ	–	bLitz, Techno4K, Bart4k, hasteka, ANNIHILATION	maaRaa
20th – 22nd	US$10,000	OG	–	niko, flameZ, degster, F1KU, NEOFRAG	ruggah
23rd – 24th	US$10,000	MOUZ	–	dexter, JDC, torzsi, frozen, xertioN	sycrone
23rd – 24th	US$10,000	Fluxo	–	WOOD7, V$M, felps, Lucaozy, history	zews
