= Perfect World Shanghai Major 2024 =

Counter-Strike 2 tournament

- 2024

Tournament information
- Game: Counter-Strike 2
- Location: Shanghai, China
- Dates: November 30–December 15, 2024
- Administrator: Valve; Perfect World
- Format: Two 16-team Swiss-system group stages 8-team single-elimination playoff
- Host(s): Perfect World; PGL (Note: English-language broadcast.)
- Venue: Shanghai World Expo Exhibition and Convention Center (Opening & Elimination stages); Shanghai Oriental Sports Center (Playoffs stage)
- Teams: 24
- Defending champions: Natus Vincere
- Purse: US$1,250,000

Final positions
- Champions: Team Spirit
- 1st runners-up: FaZe Clan
- 2nd runners-up: G2 Esports; MOUZ
- MVP: Danil "donk" Kryshkovets

The Perfect World Shanghai Major 2024 was the second Counter-Strike 2 Major Championship and twenty-first Counter-Strike Major overall. It was held in Shanghai, China from November 30 to December 15, 2024, and was the first Major organized by Perfect World. For the first time since Rio 2022, each stage of the tournament was in front of large audiences. The Opening and Elimination stages were held at the Shanghai World Expo Exhibition and Convention Center, while the Playoffs stage were held at the Shanghai Oriental Sports Center. Twenty-four teams qualified from regional qualifiers for the tournament, which included a prize pool of US$1,250,000.

Team Spirit were the Major's champions, following a 2–1 victory over FaZe Clan. 17-year-old Spirit player Danil "donk" Kryshkovets was named the tournament's MVP, making him the highest-rated ever as well as the youngest ever, since Markus "Kjaerbye" Kjærbye at Atlanta 2017.

== Background ==
Counter-Strike 2 is a multiplayer first-person shooter video game developed and published by Valve Corporation. It is the fifth game in the Counter-Strike series. In professional Counter-Strike, the Valve-sponsored Majors are considered the most prestigious tournaments.

The defending Major champions were Natus Vincere, following a 2–1 victory over FaZe Clan at Copenhagen 2024. They were eliminated following a defeat to HEROIC in the Elimination Stage.

On July 4, 2024, it was announced that Romanian tournament organizer and previous Major hosts PGL had acquired the rights to the English-language broadcast.

== Format ==
Like previous Majors using a Swiss-system group stage, twenty-four teams will qualify for the tournament. This includes sixteen teams who qualify for the Opening Stage. The top eight teams from the Opening Stage move on to the Elimination Stage, along with eight teams directly from the Regional Major Ranking (RMR) qualifiers. Finally, the top eight teams from the Elimination Stage will play a single-elimination Playoffs Stage to determine a champion. As a tiebreaker, each team with the same number of matches won and lost during the Opening and Elimination stages will be seeded according to their Buchholz score. Teams qualified for the Playoffs Stage will also be seeded according to their final Buchholz scores.

In the first two stages, all matches except for progression or elimination matches, which are played as bests-of-three, are played in a best-of-one format. All matches in the Playoff Stage are played in a best-of-three format.

=== Map pool ===
- Ancient
- Anubis
- Dust II
- Inferno
- Mirage
- Nuke
- Vertigo

== Talent ==
On November 1, 2024, PGL announced the full talent lineup for the Major's English-language broadcast.

Hosts

- James Banks (stage host)
- Richard Lewis
- Sam "TechGirl" Wright

Analysts

- Alex "Mauisnake" Ellenberg
- Janko "YNk" Paunović
- Sudhen "Bleh" Wahengbam
- Dustin "dusT" Mouret

Casters

- Jason "moses" O'Tool
- Adam "dinko" Hawthorne
- Hugo Byron
- Harry "JustHarry" Russell
- Chad "SPUNJ" Burchill
- Alex "Machine" Richardson
- Mohan "launders" Govindasamy
- Conner "Scrawny" Girvan

== Teams ==
=== Europe ===
- Cloud9
- Team Vitality
- MOUZ
- Natus Vincere
- FaZe Clan
- fnatic
- GamerLegion
- BIG Clan
- 3DMAX
- HEROIC
- Virtus.pro
- G2 Esports
- Passion UA
- Team Spirit

=== Asia ===
- Rare Atom
- The MongolZ
- FlyQuest

=== Americas ===
- MIBR
- Wildcard
- paiN Gaming
- Team Liquid
- Complexity Gaming
- Imperial Esports
- FURIA Esports

== Qualification ==
Qualification took place through three Regional Major Ranking events, based on teams' geographical regions, events were held for Europe, Americas and Asia.

Four teams who qualify from each Europe RMR earned direct berths to the Elimination Stage, in accordance with the number of each region's teams that advanced from the Elimination Stage to the Playoffs Stage of Copenhagen 2024. Like the previous Major, these places were distributed according to the highest ranked teams in the Valve Regional Standings.

The RMR tournaments for all regions took place in Shanghai, at the following dates:

- Asia: November 11–13
- Americas: November 12–15
- Europe: November 17–24
  - RMR A: November 17–20
  - RMR B: November 21–24

=== RMR results ===
Region	Opening Stage	Elimination Stage
Europe A	GamerLegion; fnatic; Cloud9	Natus Vincere; Team Vitality; MOUZ; FaZe Clan
Europe B	Virtus.pro; BIG Clan; Passion UA	G2 Esports; Team Spirit; HEROIC; 3DMAX
Americas	MIBR; paiN Gaming; Complexity Gaming; Wildcard; Team Liquid; Imperial Esports; FURIA Esports	—N/a
Asia	Rare Atom; The MongolZ; FlyQuest	—N/a

=== Team seeding ===
Following the conclusion of the Europe RMRs, Valve updated their regional standings and awarded teams Elimination Stage berths based on their new rankings. Perfect World initially had the top 4 teams from each of the Europe RMRs qualify for the Elimination Stage, following the rulebook that was in place up to Paris 2023. Team Vitality, MOUZ, Natus Vincere and FaZe (in Europe RMR A), as well as BIG and 3DMAX (in Europe RMR B), were mistakenly qualified for the Elimination Stage before Perfect World reverted to utilizing the Valve Regional Standings on November 22, during the middle of Europe RMR B.

Europe Regional Standings for qualified teams (as of 25 November, 2024)
Standing	Team Name	Roster	Seed
1	G2	huNter-, m0NESY, malbsMd, NiKo, Snax	Elimination Stage
2	Natus Vincere	Aleksib, b1t, iM, jL, w0nderful	Elimination Stage
3	Team Vitality	apEX, flameZ, mezii, Spinx, ZywOo	Elimination Stage
4	Team Spirit	chopper, donk, magixx, sh1ro, zont1x	Elimination Stage
5	MOUZ	Brollan, Jimpphat, siuhy, torzsi, xertioN	Elimination Stage
6	FaZe	broky, frozen, karrigan, rain, ropz	Elimination Stage
7	HEROIC	degster, kyxsan, NertZ, sjuush, TeSeS	Elimination Stage
11	3DMAX	Djoko, Ex3rcice, Graviti, Lucky, Maka	Elimination Stage
13	Virtus.pro	electroNic, fame, FL1T, Jame, n0rb3r7	Opening Stage
15	BIG	JDC, Krimbo, rigoN, syrsoN, tabseN	Opening Stage
17	fnatic	blameF, bodyy, KRIMZ, MATYS, nawwk	Opening Stage
22	GamerLegion	FL4MUS, sl3nd, Tauson, volt, ztr	Opening Stage
30	Cloud9	Ax1Le, Boombl4, HeavyGod, ICY, interz	Opening Stage
34	Passion UA	fear, jackasmo, jambo, s-chilla, zeRRoFIX	Opening Stage

== Opening stage ==
On November 4, 2023, it was announced that Valve had renamed the Challengers Stage and Legends Stage of the Major to "Opening Stage" and "Elimination Stage" respectively. Teams would also be seeded into these stages according to their regional standings. Like previous Majors using a Swiss-system bracket, sixteen teams will compete for eight Elimination Stage spots, with all matches besides elimination and progression matches, which are bests-of-three, being bests-of-one.

The Opening Stage was played between November 30 and December 3, 2024.

Pos	Team	W	L	RW	RL	RD	BS	Qualification
1	The MongolZ	3	0	52	15	+37	1	Qualification to Elimination Stage
2	Liquid	3	0	57	43	+14	-2	Qualification to Elimination Stage
3	GamerLegion	3	1	64	72	-8	6	Qualification to Elimination Stage
4	FURIA	3	1	68	65	+3	1	Qualification to Elimination Stage
5	paiN	3	1	65	49	+16	-4	Qualification to Elimination Stage
6	Wildcard	3	2	108	100	+8	-1	Qualification to Elimination Stage
7	BIG	3	2	89	95	-6	-3	Qualification to Elimination Stage
8	MIBR	3	2	87	68	+19	-3	Qualification to Elimination Stage
9	FlyQuest	2	3	78	97	-19	6	Eliminated
10	Passion UA	2	3	95	93	+2	4	Eliminated
11	Complexity	2	3	101	87	+14	-6	Eliminated
12	Virtus.pro	1	3	31	30	+1	1	Eliminated
13	Cloud9	1	3	55	60	-5	1	Eliminated
14	Rare Atom	1	3	68	90	-22	-1	Eliminated
15	Imperial	0	3	25	52	-27	3	Eliminated
16	fnatic	0	3	43	62	-19	-3	Eliminated

Updated to match(es) played on December 3, 2024. Source:

=== Matchup results ===
Opening Stage full results

Round 1 matches
Team	Score	Map	Score	Team
FURIA Esports	8	Vertigo	13	GamerLegion
Virtus.pro	7	Ancient	13	MIBR
Team Liquid	13	Ancient	10	Cloud9
Complexity Gaming	6	Anubis	13	FlyQuest
BIG Clan	13	Mirage	9	Passion UA
fnatic	11	Mirage	13	Wildcard
The MongolZ	13	Anubis	2	Rare Atom
paiN Gaming	13	Dust II	5	Imperial Esports

Round 2 matches
Team	Score	Map	Score	Team
1–0
BIG Clan	5	Nuke	13	FlyQuest
The MongolZ	13	Ancient	6	MIBR
Team Liquid	13	Inferno	10	Wildcard
paiN Gaming	10	Nuke	13	GamerLegion
0–1
fnatic	5	Ancient	13	Cloud9
Complexity Gaming	9	Anubis	13	Passion UA
Virtus.pro	13	Anubis	4	Rare Atom
FURIA Esports	13	Anubis	11	Imperial Esports

Round 3 matches
Team	Score	Map	Score	Team
2–0
Team Liquid	2	Series	1	FlyQuest
GamerLegion	0	Series	2	The MongolZ
1–1
BIG Clan	13	Vertigo	11	Virtus.pro
MIBR	5	Mirage	13	Passion UA
FURIA Esports	16	Vertigo	14	Wildcard
paiN Gaming	13	Anubis	11	Cloud9
0–2
Rare Atom	2	Series	1	fnatic
Complexity Gaming	2	Series	0	Imperial Esports

Round 4 matches
Team	Score	Map	Score	Team
2–1
BIG Clan	1	Series	2	FURIA Esports
FlyQuest	0	Series	2	paiN Gaming
GamerLegion	2	Series	1	Passion UA
1–2
MIBR	2	Series	1	Rare Atom
Cloud9	0	Series	2	Complexity Gaming
Wildcard	2	Series	1	Virtus.pro

Round 5 matches
Team	Score	Map	Score	Team
BIG Clan	2	Series	1	Complexity Gaming
FlyQuest	0	Series	2	MIBR
Passion UA	1	Series	2	Wildcard

== Elimination stage ==
Like the Opening Stage, the Elimination Stage is played in a Swiss-system bracket, with eight teams advancing to a single-elimination Playoffs Stage. The Elimination Stage includes the eight teams that advance from the Opening Stage, as well as the eight highest teams from the Europe RMR in Valve's regional standings. Matches are played in the same format as in the Opening Stage.

On December 6, The MongolZ secured qualification to the Playoffs Stage following a victory over HEROIC, making them the first Asian team to compete in the playoffs of a Major.

The Elimination Stage was played between December 5 and December 8, 2024.

Pos	Team	W	L	RW	RL	RD	BS	Qualification
1	The MongolZ	3	0	69	59	+10	4	Qualification to Playoffs Stage
2	Vitality	3	0	55	28	+27	-4	Qualification to Playoffs Stage
3	G2	3	1	62	33	+29	-1	Qualification to Playoffs Stage
4	Spirit	3	1	71	55	+16	-4	Qualification to Playoffs Stage
5	Liquid	3	1	72	52	+20	-5	Qualification to Playoffs Stage
6	HEROIC	3	2	127	119	+8	2	Qualification to Playoffs Stage
7	FaZe	3	2	73	91	-18	0	Qualification to Playoffs Stage
8	MOUZ	3	2	88	68	+20	-1	Qualification to Playoffs Stage
9	FURIA	2	3	104	100	+4	6	Eliminated
10	MIBR	2	3	65	110	-45	3	Eliminated
11	Natus Vincere	2	3	77	82	-5	2	Eliminated
12	GamerLegion	1	3	68	80	-12	1	Eliminated
13	3DMAX	1	3	54	63	-9	0	Eliminated
14	paiN	1	3	87	92	-5	-5	Eliminated
15	Wildcard	0	3	44	62	-18	1	Eliminated
16	BIG	0	3	41	63	-22	1	Eliminated

Updated to match(es) played on December 8, 2024. Source:

=== Matchup results ===
Elimination Stage full results

Round 1 matches
Team	Score	Map	Score	Team
G2 Esports	10	Inferno	13	The MongolZ
Natus Vincere	13	Nuke	10	Team Liquid
Team Vitality	13	Mirage	7	GamerLegion
Team Spirit	6	Dust II	13	FURIA Esports
MOUZ	13	Nuke	6	paiN Gaming
FaZe Clan	13	Ancient	10	Wildcard
HEROIC	13	Mirage	7	BIG Clan
3DMAX	11	Vertigo	13	MIBR

Round 2 matches
Team	Score	Map	Score	Team
1–0
Team Vitality	16	Mirage	13	FURIA Esports
MOUZ	13	Mirage	16	The MongolZ
Natus Vincere	11	Inferno	13	MIBR
FaZe Clan	8	Ancient	13	HEROIC
0–1
Team Liquid	13	Inferno	10	GamerLegion
Team Spirit	13	Ancient	6	Wildcard
G2 Esports	13	Mirage	5	BIG Clan
3DMAX	13	Dust II	11	paiN Gaming

Round 3 matches
Team	Score	Map	Score	Team
2–0
MIBR	0	Series	2	Team Vitality
The MongolZ	2	Series	1	HEROIC
1–1
Natus Vincere	2	Mirage	13	Team Spirit
FURIA Esports	9	Inferno	13	Team Liquid
G2 Esports	13	Ancient	8	3DMAX
MOUZ	10	Inferno	13	FaZe Clan
0–2
GamerLegion	2	Series	1	Wildcard
BIG Clan	1	Series	2	paiN Gaming

Round 4 matches
Team	Score	Map	Score	Team
2–1
G2 Esports	2	Series	0	FaZe Clan
MIBR	1	Series	2	Team Liquid
HEROIC	1	Series	2	Team Spirit
1–2
MOUZ	2	Series	0	3DMAX
Natus Vincere	2	Series	0	GamerLegion
FURIA Esports	2	Series	1	paiN Gaming

Round 5 matches
Team	Score	Map	Score	Team
MIBR	0	Series	2	MOUZ
Natus Vincere	1	Series	2	HEROIC
FURIA Esports	1	Series	2	FaZe Clan

== Playoffs stage ==
The top eight teams from the Elimination Stage will advance to a single-elimination bracket. Each match in the Playoffs Stage is played in a best-of-three format.

The Playoffs Stage was played between December 12 and December 15, 2024.

Quarterfinals
1	The MongolZ	14	9	–	0
8	MOUZ	16	13	–	2
5	Liquid	9	11	–	0
4	Spirit	13	13	–	2
3	G2	6	13	16	2
6	HEROIC	13	9	13	1
7	FaZe	6	13	13	2
2	Vitality	13	8	7	1

Semifinals
MOUZ	13	4	7	1
Spirit	7	13	13	2
G2	6	14	–	0
FaZe	13	16	–	2

Finals
Spirit	13	6	13	2
FaZe	8	13	11	1

== Final standings ==
The final placings are shown below. In addition, the prize distribution, roster, and coaches are shown.

Place	Prize Money	Team	Roster	Coach
1st	US$500,000	Team Spirit	donk, chopper, sh1ro, zont1x, magixx	hally
2nd	US$170,000	FaZe Clan	ropz, frozen, broky, rain, karrigan	NEO
3rd – 4th	US$80,000	G2 Esports	Snax, NiKo, m0NESY, malbsMd, huNter	TaZ
3rd – 4th	US$80,000	MOUZ	Brollan, siuhy, torzsi, Jimpphat, xertioN	sycrone
5th – 8th	US$45,000	Team Vitality	apEX, ZywOo, flameZ, Spinx, mezii	XTQZZZ
5th – 8th	US$45,000	HEROIC	NertZ, TeSeS, sjuush, degster, kyxsan	sAw
5th – 8th	US$45,000	Team Liquid	Twistzz, jks, ultimate, NAF, YEKINDAR	mithR
5th – 8th	US$45,000	The MongolZ	bLitz, Techno4K, Senzu, mzinho, 910	maaRaa
9th – 11th	US$20,000	FURIA Esports	FalleN, chelo, yuurih, KSCERATO, skullz	sidde
9th – 11th	US$20,000	Natus Vincere	Aleksib, iM, b1t, jL, w0nderful	B1ad3
9th – 11th	US$20,000	MIBR	exit, Lucaozy, saffee, drop, insani	nak
12th – 14th	US$20,000	GamerLegion	ztr, Tauson, volt, sl3nd, FL4MUS	ash
12th – 14th	US$20,000	paiN Gaming	biguzera, nqz, kauez, snow, lux	rikz
12th – 14th	US$20,000	3DMAX	Maka, Lucky, Djoko, Ex3rcice, Graviti	wasiNk
15th – 16th	US$20,000	BIG Clan	tabseN, syrsoN, rigoN, JDC, Krimbo	kakafu
15th – 16th	US$20,000	Wildcard	stanislaw, Sonic, phzy, susp, JBa	vinS
17th – 19th	US$10,000	Passion UA	fear, jambo, s-chilla, jackasmo, zeRRoFIX	Kane
17th – 19th	US$10,000	FlyQuest	dexter, Liazz, aliStair, INS, Vexite	erkaSt
17th – 19th	US$10,000	Complexity Gaming	EliGE, JT, floppy, hallzerk, Grim	T.c
20th – 22nd	US$10,000	Virtus.pro	Jame, FL1T, fame, n0rb3r7, electroNic	PASHANOJ
20th – 22nd	US$10,000	Cloud9	Ax1Le, Boombl4, HeavyGod, ICY, interz	groove
20th – 22nd	US$10,000	Rare Atom	somebody, Summer, L1haNg, ChildKing, kaze	z8z
23rd – 24th	US$10,000	Imperial Esports	felps, VINI, try, decenty, noway	zakk
23rd – 24th	US$10,000	fnatic	KRIMZ, bodyy, nawwk, blameF, MATYS	keita
