= PGL Major Copenhagen 2024 =

Counter-Strike 2 tournament

- 2024

Tournament information
- Game: Counter-Strike 2
- Location: Copenhagen, Denmark
- Dates: March 17–31, 2024
- Administrator: Valve; PGL
- Format: Two 16-team Swiss-system group stages 8-team single-elimination playoff
- Host: PGL
- Venue: Royal Arena
- Teams: 24
- Defending champions: Team Vitality
- Purse: US$1,250,000

Final positions
- Champions: Natus Vincere
- 1st runners-up: FaZe Clan
- 2nd runners-up: Team Vitality; G2 Esports
- MVP: Justinas "jL" Lekavicius

The PGL Major Copenhagen 2024 was the first Counter-Strike 2 Major Championship and twentieth Counter-Strike Major overall. It was held in Copenhagen, Denmark at the Royal Arena from March 17 to 31, 2024. Twenty-four teams qualified from regional qualifiers for the tournament, which involved a prize pool of US$1,250,000. It is the fourth Counter-Strike Major organized by PGL after PGL Major: Kraków 2017, PGL Major Stockholm 2021 and PGL Major Antwerp 2022. Natus Vincere were the tournament's champions, following a 2–1 victory over FaZe Clan.

== Background ==
Counter-Strike 2 is a multiplayer first-person shooter video game developed and published by Valve Corporation. It is the fifth game in the Counter-Strike series. In professional Counter-Strike, the Valve-sponsored Majors are the most prestigious tournaments.

The defending Major champions were Team Vitality, who won their first Major championship at Blast Paris Major 2023. They would be eliminated following a semi-final defeat to FaZe Clan.

== Format ==
On November 4, 2023, it was announced that Valve had renamed the Major's stages from Challengers Stage, Legends Stage and Champions Stage to "Opening Stage", "Elimination Stage" and "Playoffs Stage", respectively.

Like previous Majors using a Swiss-system group stage, twenty-four teams qualified for the tournament. This includes sixteen teams who qualified for the Opening Stage. The top eight teams from the Opening Stage moved on to the Elimination Stage, along with eight teams directly from the Regional Major Ranking (RMR) qualifiers. Finally, the top eight teams from the Elimination Stage played a single-elimination Playoffs Stage to determine a champion.

In the first two stages, all matches except for progression or elimination matches, which are played as bests-of-three, are played in a best-of-one format. All matches in the Playoff Stage are played in a best-of-three format. It is the first Major to be played with Counter-Strike 2's new 12-round halves.

=== Map pool ===
- Ancient
- Anubis
- Inferno
- Mirage
- Nuke
- Overpass
- Vertigo

== Talent ==
On March 13, 2024, PGL announced the full talent lineup for the Major, including the first ever "Newbie" stream, intended to ease in newer viewers unfamiliar with Counter-Strike.

Hosts

- James Banks (stage host)
- Richard Lewis
- Eefje "sjokz" Depoortere
- Pala Gilroy Sen

Analysts

- Jacob "Pimp" Winneche
- Mathieu "Maniac" Quiquerez
- Sudhen "Bleh" Wahengbam
- Jason "moses" O'Toole

Casters

- Anders Blume
- Henry "HenryG" Greer
- Chad "SPUNJ" Burchill
- Alex "Machine" Richardson
- Harry "JustHarry" Russell
- Hugo Byron
- Mohan "launders" Govindasamy
- Conner "scrawny" Girvan
- Vince Hill (Newbie stream)
- Jack "Jacky" Peters (Newbie stream)

== Teams ==
=== Europe ===
- G2 Esports
- Virtus.pro
- Movistar KOI
- FaZe Clan
- Natus Vincere
- AMKAL ESPORTS
- SAW
- Eternal Fire
- Cloud9
- MOUZ
- Apeks
- Team Vitality
- Team Spirit
- ENCE
- ECSTATIC
- HEROIC
- GamerLegion (Note: GamerLegion, who were the runners-up in the Last Chance Qualifier, replaced 9 Pandas following reported visa issues.)

=== Asia ===
- The Mongolz
- Lynn Vision

=== Americas ===
- Imperial Esports
- FURIA Esports
- paiN Gaming
- Legacy
- Complexity Gaming

== Qualification ==
Qualification took place through three Regional Major Ranking events, based on teams' geographical regions, events were held in Europe, Americas and Asia. Unlike in previous Majors where teams were seeded according to performance at RMRs, a number of Opening Stage and Elimination Stage places were instead distributed according to Valve's own regional standings.

Seven teams from Europe and one team from the Americas RMRs who qualified earned direct berths to the Elimination Stage, in accordance with the number of each region's teams that advanced from the Legends Stage to the playoffs of Paris 2023.

The RMR tournaments took place in the following cities:

- Europe: Bucharest, Romania: February 14–24
  - RMR A: February 14–17
  - RMR B: February 19–22
  - Last Chance Qualifier: February 23–24
- Asia: Shanghai, China: February 26–28
- Americas: Monterrey, Mexico: March 1–4

=== RMR results ===
Region	Opening Stage	Elimination Stage
Europe A	Eternal Fire; SAW; AMKAL ESPORTS; Movistar KOI	FaZe Clan; Virtus.pro; Natus Vincere; G2 Esports
Europe B	Cloud9; ENCE; Apeks; HEROIC; ECSTATIC	Team Spirit; Team Vitality; MOUZ
Americas	FURIA Esports; Imperial Esports; paiN Gaming; Legacy	Complexity Gaming
Asia	The Mongolz; Lynn Vision	—N/a
Last Chance Qualifier	~~9 Pandas~~	—N/a

=== Team seeding ===
Following the conclusion of the Americas RMRs, Valve updated their regional standings and awarded teams Elimination Stage berths based on their new rankings.

Valve Regional Standings for qualified teams (as of March 4, 2024)

Europe
Standing	Team Name	Roster	Seed
1	FaZe	karrigan, rain, frozen, ropz, broky	Elimination Stage
2	Spirit	chopper, sh1ro, magixx, zont1x, donk	Elimination Stage
3	Vitality	apEX, ZywOo, flameZ, Spinx, mezii	Elimination Stage
4	MOUZ	Brollan, siuhy, torzsi, Jimpphat, xertioN	Elimination Stage
5	Virtus.pro	mir, FL1T, Jame, n0rb3r7, fame	Elimination Stage
6	Natus Vincere	Aleksib, iM, b1t, jL, w0nderful	Elimination Stage
7	G2	NiKo, huNter-, nexa, HooXi, m0NESY	Elimination Stage
9	Cloud9	HObbit, electroNic, Boombl4, Ax1Le, Perfecto	Opening Stage
10	Eternal Fire	MAJ3R, XANTARES, woxic, Calyx, Wicadia	Opening Stage
11	ENCE	gla1ve, Goofy, dycha, hades, Kylar	Opening Stage
12	Apeks	STYKO, jkaem, nawwk, sense, CacaNito	Opening Stage
13	HEROIC	NertZ, TeSeS, nicoodoz, sjuush, kyxsan	Opening Stage
14	GamerLegion	Snax, acoR, Keoz, isak, volt	Opening Stage
19	9 Pandas	seized, clax, iDISBALANCE, glowiing, d1Ledez	—N/a
20	SAW	MUTiRiS, roman, story, ewjerkz, arrozdoce	Opening Stage
21	ECSTATIC	Nodios, Patti, Queenix, kraghen, salazar	Opening Stage
23	AMKAL	NickelBack, Krad, Forester, TRAVIS, ICY	Opening Stage
27	KOI	JUST, mopoz, stadodo, dav1g, adamS	Opening Stage

Americas
Standing	Team Name	Roster	Seed
1	Complexity	EliGE, JT, floppy, hallzerk, Grim	Elimination Stage
2	FURIA	FalleN, chelo, arT, yuurih, KSCERATO	Opening Stage
5	Imperial	HEN1, felps, VINI, decenty, noway	Opening Stage
7	paiN	biguzera, n1ssim, nqz, kauez, lux	Opening Stage
9	Legacy	coldzera, NEKIZ, dumau, b4rtiN, latto	Opening Stage

Asia
Standing	Team Name	Roster	Seed
1	TheMongolz	bLitz, Techno, Senzu, mzinho, 910	Opening Stage
2	Lynn Vision	Westmelon, z4kr, Starry, Jee, EmiliaQAQ	Opening Stage

== Opening stage ==
On November 4, 2023, it was announced that Valve had renamed the Challengers Stage and Legends Stage of the Major to "Opening Stage" and "Elimination Stage" respectively. Teams would also be seeded into these stages according to their regional standings. Like previous Majors using a Swiss-system bracket, sixteen teams will compete for eight Elimination Stage spots, with all matches besides elimination and progression matches, which are bests-of-three, being bests-of-one.

The Opening Stage was played between March 17 and March 20, 2024.

Pos	Team	W	L	RW	RL	RD	BS	Qualification
1	HEROIC	3	0	58	40	+18	1	Qualification to Elimination Stage
2	Cloud9	3	0	58	46	+12	0	Qualification to Elimination Stage
3	Eternal Fire	3	1	77	63	+14	5	Qualification to Elimination Stage
4	ECSTATIC	3	1	72	57	+15	3	Qualification to Elimination Stage
5	paiN	3	1	54	41	+13	-3	Qualification to Elimination Stage
6	Imperial	3	2	113	105	+8	0	Qualification to Elimination Stage
7	TheMongolz	3	2	102	80	+22	-2	Qualification to Elimination Stage
8	FURIA	3	2	100	75	+25	-9	Qualification to Elimination Stage
9	SAW	2	3	83	97	-14	2	Eliminated
10	Legacy	2	3	71	79	-8	2	Eliminated
11	GamerLegion	2	3	88	93	-5	-2	Eliminated
12	Lynn Vision	1	3	40	61	-21	7	Eliminated
13	ENCE	1	3	55	73	-18	1	Eliminated
14	Apeks	1	3	45	65	-10	-1	Eliminated
15	AMKAL	0	3	46	63	-17	-2	Eliminated
16	KOI	0	3	31	55	-24	-2	Eliminated

Updated to match(es) played on March 20, 2024. Source:

== Elimination stage ==
Like the Opening Stage, the Elimination Stage is played in a Swiss-system bracket, with eight teams advancing to a single-elimination Playoffs Stage. The Elimination Stage includes the eight teams that advance from the Opening Stage, as well as the seven highest teams from the Europe RMR and the highest team from the Americas RMR in Valve's regional standings. Matches are played in the same format as in the Opening Stage.

During a 2–2 bracket match between Virtus.pro and G2 Esports, Virtus.pro player Dzhami "Jame" Ali experienced a game crash, after what was later determined to be an NVIDIA driver crash. The event led to G2 reaching map point, and caused a response regarding controversial technical issues with the Major, including from G2 player Nikola "NiKo" Kovač.

The Elimination Stage was played between March 21 and March 24, 2024.

Pos	Team	W	L	RW	RL	RD	BS	Qualification
1	Spirit	3	0	65	41	+27	1	Qualification to Playoffs Stage
2	MOUZ	3	0	52	25	+27	-1	Qualification to Playoffs Stage
3	Eternal Fire	3	1	69	50	+19	5	Qualification to Playoffs Stage
4	Cloud9	3	1	73	49	+24	3	Qualification to Playoffs Stage
5	Vitality	3	1	75	70	+5	-4	Qualification to Playoffs Stage
6	Natus Vincere	3	2	108	119	-11	2	Qualification to Playoffs Stage
7	G2	3	2	110	90	+20	-3	Qualification to Playoffs Stage
8	FaZe	3	2	84	74	+10	-6	Qualification to Playoffs Stage
9	Complexity	2	3	86	117	-31	3	Eliminated
10	Virtus.pro	2	3	91	100	-9	-2	Eliminated
11	paiN	2	3	107	109	-2	-6	Eliminated
12	Imperial	1	3	53	66	-13	5	Eliminated
13	ECSTATIC	1	3	82	93	-11	3	Eliminated
14	HEROIC	1	3	51	68	-17	-2	Eliminated
15	TheMongolz	0	3	61	70	-9	2	Eliminated
16	FURIA	0	3	40	66	-26	0	Eliminated

Updated to match(es) played on March 24, 2024. Source:

== Playoffs stage ==
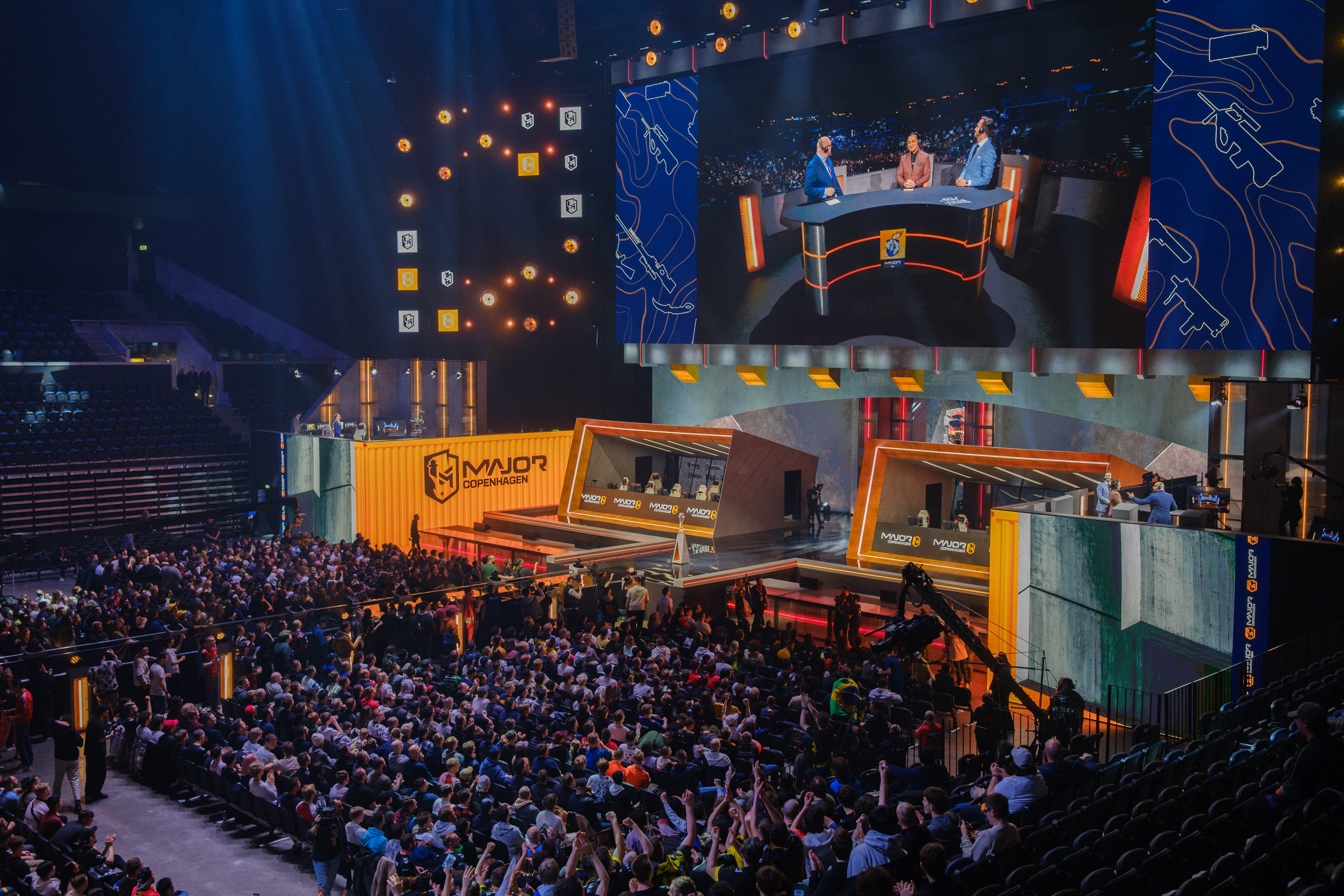
The stage at Royal Arena for the playoffs

The top eight teams from the Elimination Stage will advance to a single-elimination bracket. Each match in the Playoffs Stage is played in a best-of-three format.

On March 29, during a quarter-final match between G2 and MOUZ, spectators rushed the stage and were tackled by event security, damaging the trophy. PGL released a statement following the incident stating that they intended to press charges against the disruptors, who were reportedly involved with a Counter-Strike gambling platform.

The Playoffs Stage was played between March 28 and March 31, 2024.

Quarterfinals
1	Spirit	7	19	14	1
8	FaZe	13	16	16	2
5	Vitality	13	13	–	2
4	Cloud9	8	2	–	0
3	Eternal Fire	13	9	–	0
6	Natus Vincere	16	13	–	2
7	G2	13	13	–	2
2	MOUZ	9	6	–	0

Semifinals
FaZe	13	5	13	2
Vitality	7	13	8	1
Natus Vincere	16	7	13	2
G2	13	13	11	1

Finals
FaZe	9	13	3	1
Natus Vincere	13	2	13	2

== Final standings ==
The final placings are shown below. In addition, the prize distribution, roster, and coaches are shown.

Place	Prize Money	Team	Roster	Coach
1st	US$500,000	Natus Vincere	Aleksib, iM, b1t, jL, w0nderful	B1ad3
2nd	US$170,000	FaZe Clan	karrigan, rain, frozen, broky, ropz	NEO
3rd – 4th	US$80,000	G2 Esports	NiKo, huNter-, nexa, HooXi, m0NESY	TaZ
3rd – 4th	US$80,000	Team Vitality	apEX, ZywOo, flameZ, Spinx, mezii	XTQZZZ
5th – 8th	US$45,000	MOUZ	siuhy, Brollan, torzsi, Jimpphat, xertioN	sycrone
5th – 8th	US$45,000	Eternal Fire	MAJ3R, XANTARES, woxic, Calyx, Wicadia	Fabre
5th – 8th	US$45,000	Team Spirit	chopper, sh1ro, magixx, zont1x, donk	hally
5th – 8th	US$45,000	Cloud9	HObbit, electroNic, Perfecto, Boombl4, Ax1Le	groove
9th – 11th	US$20,000	paiN Gaming	biguzera, n1ssim, nqz, kauez, lux	rikz
9th – 11th	US$20,000	Virtus.pro	mir, FL1T, Jame, n0rb3r7, fame	dastan
9th – 11th	US$20,000	Complexity Gaming	JT, hallzerk, EliGE, floppy, Grim	T.c
12th – 14th	US$20,000	HEROIC	NertZ, nicoodoz, sjuush, TeSeS, kyxsan	sAw
12th – 14th	US$20,000	ECSTATIC	Nodios, Patti, kraghen, salazar, Queenix	casle
12th – 14th	US$20,000	Imperial Esports	HEN1, felps, VINI, decenty, noway	zakk
15th – 16th	US$20,000	FURIA Esports	arT, FalleN, chelo, yuurih, KSCERATO	guerri
15th – 16th	US$20,000	TheMongolz	bLitz, 910, Techno, Senzu, mzinho	maaRaa
17th – 19th	US$10,000	SAW	MUTiRiS, story, arrozdoce, ewjerkz, roman	NABOWOW
17th – 19th	US$10,000	GamerLegion	isak, Snax, Keoz, acoR, volt	ash
17th – 19th	US$10,000	Legacy	coldzera, NEKIZ, dumau, b4rtiN, latto	chucky
20th – 22nd	US$10,000	ENCE	gla1ve, Goofy, hades, dycha, Kylar	kuben
20th – 22nd	US$10,000	Apeks	STYKO, jkaem, nawwk, sense, CacaNito	mithR
20th – 22nd	US$10,000	Lynn Vision	Westmelon, EmiliaQAQ, Jee, Starry, z4kr	GUM
23rd – 24th	US$10,000	Movistar KOI	JUST, mopoz, adamS, dav1g, stadodo	deLonge
23rd – 24th	US$10,000	AMKAL ESPORTS	NickelBack, ICY, Krad, Forester, TRAVIS	svyat
