= PGL Esports =

Esports organizer and production company

SC PGL Esports S.R.L.
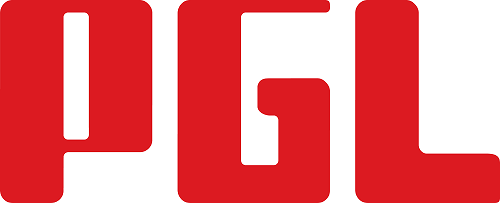
- Type: Private
- Industry: Esports
- Founded: February 25, 2002
- Headquarters: Bucharest, Romania
- Area served: Worldwide
- Key people: Silviu Stroie (CEO)
- Number of employees: 51-200
- Website: www.pglesports.com

PGL Esports (simply PGL) is a Romanian esports production company based in Bucharest that produces Dota 2 and Counter-Strike 2 tournaments. They are most notable for producing developer-sponsored events such as Counter-Strike Major Championships as well as The International series of events.

== History ==
PGL was founded in Romania in 2002. PGL began hosting Dota 2 tournaments with the Manila Major in 2016. Since then, they have hosted major events including each of The Internationals between 2016 and 2024. Recently, PGL announced events between 2024 and 2026, including their Wallachia series of events.

PGL has hosted multiple Counter-Strike Major Championships, including PGL Major: Krakow 2017 and PGL Major Stockholm 2021, as well as the first Counter-Strike 2 Major, PGL Major Copenhagen 2024. They also produced the English broadcast for the Perfect World Shanghai Major 2024.

== Dota 2 ==
PGL has hosted Dota 2 tournaments since 2016, including Valve-sponsored Majors and The International, as well as their own independent tournament series.

=== Notable tournaments ===
| Name | Date | Location | Champion | Runner-up | Prize pool | Ref. |
|---|---|---|---|---|---|---|
| The Manila Major 2016 | June 3–12, 2016 | Mall of Asia Arena, Manila | OG Esports | Team Liquid | US$3,000,000 | |
| The International 2016 | August 2–13, 2016 | Climate Pledge Arena, Seattle | Wings Gaming | Digital Chaos | US$20,770,460 | |
| The Boston Major 2016 | December 3–10, 2016 | Wang Theater, Boston | OG Esports | Ad Finem | US$3,000,000 | |
| The Kiev Major 2017 | April 24–30, 2017 | National Palace of Arts, Kyiv | OG Esports | Virtus.pro | US$3,000,000 | |
| The International 2017 | August 2–12, 2017 | Climate Pledge Arena, Seattle | Team Liquid | Newbee | US$24,787,916 | |
| The Bucharest Major | March 4–11, 2018 | Polyvalent Hall, Bucharest | Virtus.pro | VGJ.Thunder | US$1,000,000 | |
| Dota 2 Asia Championships 2018 | March 29–April 7, 2018 | Shanghai Oriental Sports Center, Shanghai | Mineski | LGD Gaming | US$1,000,000 | |
| China Dota2 Supermajor | June 2–10, 2018 | Yuanshen Gymnasium, Shanghai | Team Liquid | Virtus.pro | US$1,500,000 | |
| The International 2018 | August 15–25, 2018 | Rogers Arena, Vancouver | OG Esports | LGD Gaming | US$25,532,177 | |
| The Kuala Lumpur Major | November 9–18, 2018 | Axiata Arena, Kuala Lumpur | Virtus.pro | Team Secret | US$1,000,000 | |
| The International 2019 | August 15–25, 2019 | Mercedez-Benz Arena, Shanghai | OG Esports | Team Liquid | US$34,330,068 | |
| ONE Esports Singapore Major 2021 (Note: Organized in partnership with ONE Esports.) | March 27–April 4, 2021 | Fairmont Singapore, Singapore | Invictus Gaming | Evil Geniuses | US$500,000 | |
| The International 2021 | October 7–17, 2021 | Arena Națională, Bucharest | Team Spirit | LGD Gaming | US$40,018,195 | |
| PGL Arlington Major 2022 | August 4–14, 2022 | Esports Stadium Arlington, Arlington | Team Spirit | LGD Gaming | US$500,000 | |
| The International 2022 | October 15–30, 2022 | Singapore (Note: The playoffs weekend was played at Suntec Singapore, and the finals weekend was played at the Singapore Indoor Stadium.) | Tundra Esports | Team Secret | US$18,930,775 | |
| The International 2023 | October 12–29, 2023 | Seattle (Note: The playoffs weekend was played at Seattle Convention Center, and the finals weekend was played at the Climate Pledge Arena.) | Team Spirit | Gaimin Gladiators | US$3,380,455 | |
| PGL Wallachia Season 1 | May 10–19, 2024 | PGL Studio, Bucharest | Team Spirit | Xtreme Gaming | US$1,000,000 | |
| The International 2024 | September 4–15, 2024 | Royal Arena, Copenhagen | Team Liquid | Gaimin Gladiators | US$2,776,566 | |
| PGL Wallachia Season 2 | October 4–13, 2024 | PGL Studio, Bucharest | HEROIC | Team Falcons | US$1,000,000 | |
| PGL Wallachia Season 3 | March 8–16, 2025 | PGL Studio, Bucharest | Team Liquid | Tundra Esports | US$1,000,000 | |
| PGL Wallachia Season 4 | April 19–27, 2025 | PGL Studio, Bucharest | Team Liquid | PARIVISION | US$1,000,000 | |
| PGL Wallachia Season 5 | November 15–23, 2025 | PGL Studio, Bucharest | TBD | TBD | US$1,000,000 | |

== Counter-Strike 2 ==
PGL has hosted Counter-Strike tournaments beginning in Counter-Strike: Global Offensive with Minor qualifiers for MLG Major Championship: Columbus in 2016. Since then, PGL have hosted several Valve-sponsored Major Championships. Beginning in 2025, after Valve banned tournament organizers from selling tournament spots to teams, PGL announced that it would organize independent non-Major events in 2025 and 2026 for the first time.

PGL also organized the English-language broadcast for the Perfect World Shanghai Major 2024.

=== Notable tournaments ===
| Name | Date | Location | Champion | Runner-up | Third place | Prize pool | Ref. |
In Counter-Strike: Global Offensive
| PGL Major Kraków 2017 | July 16–23, 2017 | Tauron Arena, Kraków | Gambit Esports | Immortals | Astralis; Virtus.pro | US$1,000,000 | |
| PGL Major Stockholm 2021 | October 26–November 7, 2021 | Stockholm (Note: The first and second stages were played at the Quality Hotel Globe, and the playoffs were played at the Avicii Arena.) | Natus Vincere | G2 Esports | Gambit Esports; Heroic | US$2,000,000 | |
| PGL Major Antwerp 2022 | May 9–22, 2022 | Sportpaleis, Antwerp | FaZe Clan | Natus Vincere | Team Spirit; ENCE | US$1,000,000 | |
In Counter-Strike 2
| PGL Major Copenhagen 2024 | March 17–31, 2024 | Royal Arena, Copenhagen | Natus Vincere | FaZe Clan | Team Vitality; G2 Esports | US$1,250,000 | |
| PGL Cluj-Napoca 2025 | February 14–23, 2025 | Bucharest/Cluj-Napoca (Note: The group stage took place at the PGL Studios in Bucharest, and the playoffs took place at the BTarena in Cluj-Napoca.) | MOUZ | Team Falcons | Astralis | US$1,250,000 | |
| PGL Bucharest 2025 | April 6–13, 2025 | PGL Studio, Bucharest | Team Falcons | G2 Esports | FaZe Clan | US$1,250,000 (Note: Player share: US$625,000 Organization share: US$625,000) | |
| PGL Astana 2025 | May 10–18, 2025 | Barys Arena, Astana | Team Spirit | Astralis | Aurora Gaming | US$1,250,000 | |
| PGL Masters Bucharest 2025 | October 26–November 1, 2025 | PGL Studio, Bucharest | Aurora Gaming | Legacy | SAW | US$1,250,000 | |
| PGL Cluj-Napoca 2026 | February 11–22, 2026 | BTarena, Cluj-Napoca | Team Vitality | PARIVISION | MOUZ | US$1,250,000 | |
| PGL Bucharest 2026 | April 2–12, 2026 | PGL Studio, Bucharest | FUT Esports | Astralis | The MongolZ | US$1,250,000 | |
| PGL Astana 2026 | May 7–17, 2026 | Barys Arena, Astana | Team Spirit | Team Falcons | MOUZ | US$1,600,000 (Note: Player share: US$800,000 Organization share: US$800,000) | |
| PGL Masters Bucharest 2026 | October 24–31, 2026 | PGL Studio, Bucharest | TBD | TBD | TBD | US$1,250,000 | |
| PGL Major Singapore 2026 | November 25–December 13, 2026 | Singapore Indoor Stadium, Singapore | TBD | TBD | TBD | US$1,250,000 | |
