= Ropz =

Estonian professional Counter-Strike player

ropz
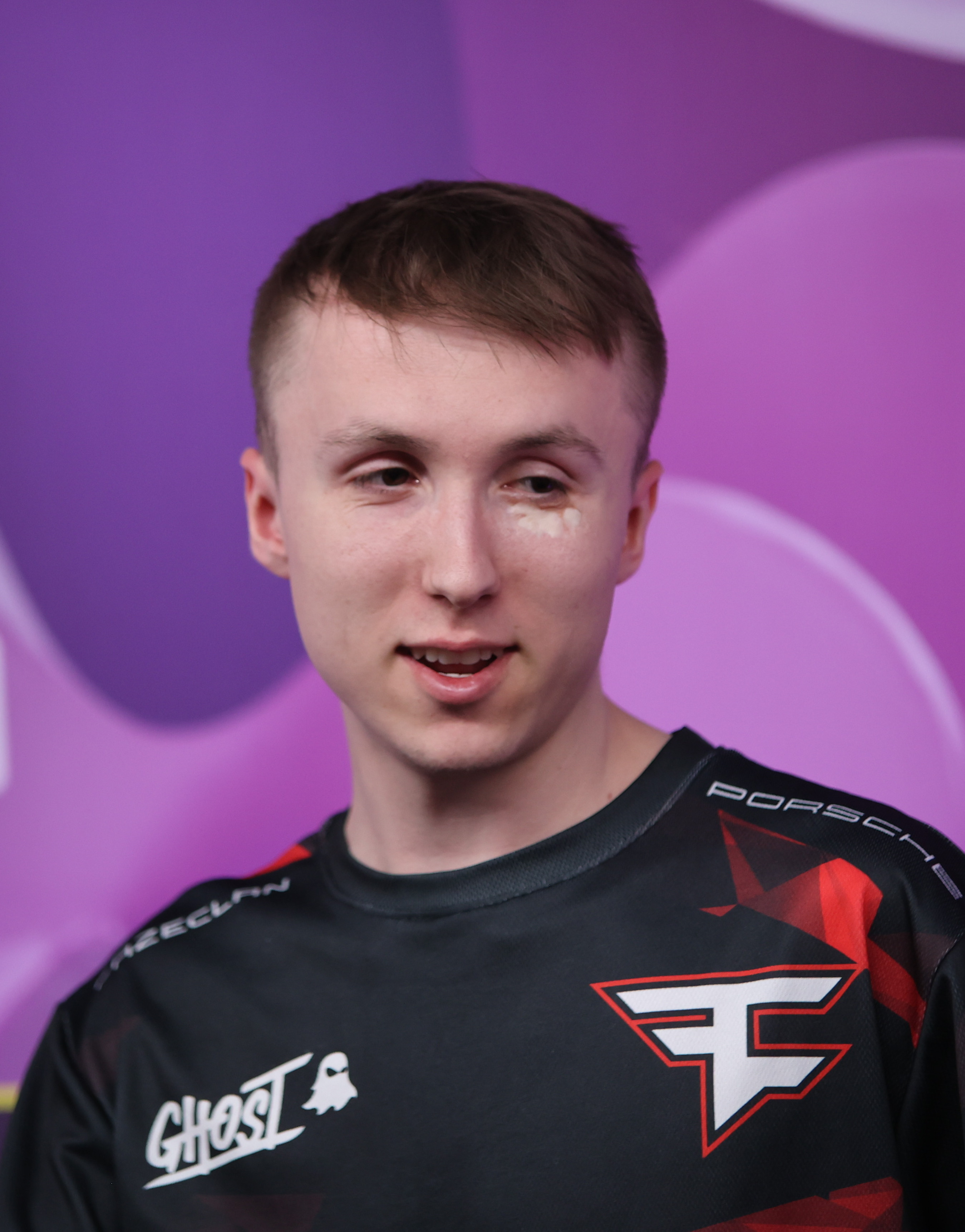
- ropz in 2023

Personal information
- Name: Robin Kool
- Born: 22 December 1999 (age 26)
- Nationality: Estonian

Current team
- Team: Team Vitality
- Role: Rifler; Lurker
- Game: Counter-Strike 2

Career information
- Playing career: 2015–present

Team history
- 2017–2021: mousesports
- 2022–2024: FaZe Clan
- 2025–present: Team Vitality

Career highlights and awards
- 3× CS:GO/CS2 Major champion (Antwerp 2022, Austin 2025, Budapest 2025); 3× ESL Grand Slam champion (Season 4–6); 8× HLTV Top 20 Player of the Year (2018–2025); 6× HLTV MVP; HLTV 2023, 2025 Closer of the Year

Twitch information
- Channel: ropz
- Followers: 320 thousand
- Last updated: August 13th, 2026

Robin Kool (born 22 December 1999), better known as ropz, is an Estonian professional Counter-Strike 2 player for Team Vitality. Kool has played in twelve Majors, winning the PGL Major Antwerp 2022, the Blast Austin Major 2025 and the StarLadder Budapest Major 2025. He has also won three ESL Grand Slams, more than any other CS player.

== Early and personal life ==
Kool was born on 22 December 1999. He grew up in Jõgeva, Estonia. His father committed suicide when Kool was younger.

== Career ==
Before Kool joined mousesports, he played Call of Duty for Team Horizon; he played as a sniper. Kool joined mousesports around April 2017 and obtained nine trophies while with the team. He was regarded as the MVP of the ESL Pro League Season 10 Finals and has consistently been in HLTV's top 20 list of players since 2018 (Respectively #19, #10, #7, #18 and #3). Kool earned back-to-back top 10 spots on the list in 2019 and 2020.

After playing almost five years with mousesports, Kool joined FaZe Clan in January 2022. His switch turned out to be successful; they qualified to the BLAST Premier: Spring Finals and won the first LAN tournament of the year – IEM Katowice 2022. This was followed by Faze and ropz winning a second consecutive title at ESL Pro League Season 15 and ropz being named the tournament MVP. Faze also won IEM Cologne and ESL Pro League Season 17, completing an Intel Grand Slam – 4th time in history for any team to achieve this.

Ropz left FaZe Clan on January 1st, 2025, and on January 10th, he signed with Vitality. Just 30 days after the joining Vitality, Ropz won IEM Katowice 2025, Ropz's second career IEM Katowice win. With Team Vitality, he would go on to win ESL Pro League Season 21, BLAST Open Lisbon 2025, and IEM Melbourne 2025. With the win at Melbourne, ropz along with Team Vitality won the ESL Grand Slam Season 5, making ropz the second two-time ESL Grand Slam winner after Twistzz. They continued to win BLAST Rivals Season 1 and IEM Dallas 2025, having been undefeated in 30 LAN matches, which was the second-highest win streak in Counter-Strike history. The win streak ended when Vitality lost against Legacy in a BO1 on Inferno during the Austin Major.

Vitality's 2025 season was quieter after the mid-year player break, winning two tournaments from July to December. The first of these wins came in October with a successful run at ESL Pro League Season 22, defeating Team Falcons 3-0 in the grand final. Vitality won again at the last major tournament of the year at StarLadder Budapest Major 2025, where Ropz played against his former team, FaZe. With their win at the Budapest major, Ropz and Vitality become the second organisation to win all the Majors in one calendar year. Ropz was given the HLTV award for being the 3rd best player of 2025 and being named the closer of the year.

Vitality began 2026 in similar form to 2025, winning four tournaments in the first four months of the year, taking first place at IEM Kraków 2026, PGL Cluj-Napoca 2026, BLAST Open Rotterdam 2026, and IEM Rio 2026. Ropz played in high form throughout these tournaments, winning his sixth MVP award at BLAST Open Rotterdam, securing the award with an exceptional grand finals performance. With Vitality's win at IEM Rio 2026, Ropz becomes the first and only player so far to have won three ESL Grand Slams.

== Notable tournament results ==
=== Grand finals ===
Bold denotes a CS Major.

Year	Place	Tournament	Team	Winning score	Opponent	Prize money	Awards	Ref
2026	1st	ESL Pro League Season 24	Vitality	3–0	Mouz	$295,000.00		
2026	1st	StarLadder StarSeries Fall 2026	Vitality	3–1	Aurora Gaming	$100,000.00		
2026	1st	BLAST Rivals 2026 Season 1	Vitality	3–0	Natus Vincere	$125,000.00		
2026	1st	IEM Rio 2026	Vitality	3–0	Team Spirit	$125,000.00		
2026	1st	BLAST Open Rotterdam 2026	Vitality	3–0	Natus Vincere	$150,000.00	HLTV MVP	
2026	1st	PGL Cluj-Napoca	Vitality	3–0	PARIVISION	$225,000.00		
2026	1st	IEM Kraków 2026	Vitality	3–1	Furia Esports	$400,000.00		
2025	1st	**StarLadder Budapest Major 2025**	Vitality	3–1	FaZe Clan	$500,000.00		
2025	1st	ESL Pro League Season 22	Vitality	3–0	Team Falcons	$100,000.00		
2025	1st	**Blast Austin Major 2025**	Vitality	2–1	The MongolZ	$500,000.00		
2025	1st	IEM Dallas 2025	Vitality	3–0	Mouz	$125,000.00		
2025	1st	BLAST Rivals 2025 Season 1	Vitality	3–2	Team Falcons	$125,000.00		
2025	1st	IEM Melbourne 2025	Vitality	3–2	Team Falcons	$125,000.00		
2025	1st	BLAST Open Lisbon 2025	Vitality	3–2	Mouz	$150,000.00		
2025	1st	ESL Pro League Season 21	Vitality	3–0	Mouz	$100,000.00	DHL MVP	
2025	1st	IEM Katowice 2025	Vitality	3–0	Spirit	$500,000.00		
2024	1st	IEM Chengdu 2024	FaZe Clan	2–0	Mouz	$100,000.00		
2023	1st	CS Asia Championships 2023	FaZe Clan	2–0	Mouz	$250,000.00	HLTV MVP	
2023	1st	Thunderpick World Championship 2023	FaZe Clan	2–0	Virtus.pro	$250,000.00	HLTV MVP	
2023	1st	Intel Extreme Masters Sydney 2023	FaZe Clan	2–1	Complexity Gaming	$100,000.00	DHL MVP	
2023	1st	ESL Pro League Season 17	FaZe Clan	3–1	Cloud9	$200,000.00	HLTV MVP	
2022	1st	**PGL Major Antwerp 2022**	FaZe Clan	2–0	Natus Vincere	$500,000.00		
2022	1st	Intel Extreme Masters XVII – Cologne	FaZe Clan	3–2	Natus Vincere	$400,000.00		
2022	1st	ESL Pro League Season 15	FaZe Clan	3–1	ENCE	$190,000.00	HLTV MVP	
2022	1st	Intel Extreme Masters XVI – Katowice	FaZe Clan	3–0	G2	$400,000.00		
2020	1st	Ice Challenge 2020	mousesports	3–1	Natus Vincere	$125,000.00		
2019	1st	ESL Pro League Season 10	mousesports	3–0	fnatic	$250,000.00	HLTV MVP	
2019	1st	CS:GO Asia Championships 2019	mousesports	2–0	ENCE	$250,000.00		
2018	1st	ESL One New York 2018	mousesports	3–2	Team Liquid	$125,000.00		
2018	1st	V4 Future Sports Festival 2018	mousesports	2–1	Virtus.pro	$238,000.00		
2018	1st	StarSeries i-League Season 4	mousesports	2–1	Natus Vincere	$130,000.00		
2017	1st	ESG Tour Mykonos 2017	mousesports	3–2	Team Liquid	$117,500.00		
2025	2nd	BLAST Open London 2025	Team Vitality	2–3	G2	$60,000.00		
2024	2nd	**Perfect World Shanghai Major 2024**	FaZe Clan	1–2	Spirit	$170,000.00		
2024	2nd	**PGL Major Copenhagen 2024**	FaZe Clan	1–2	Natus Vincere	$170,000.00		
2024	2nd	IEM Katowice 2024	FaZe Clan	0–3	Spirit	$180,000.00		
2023	2nd	BLAST Premier World Final 2023	FaZe Clan	0–2	Vitality	$250,000.00		
2023	2nd	BLAST Premier Fall Final 2023	FaZe Clan	0–2	Vitality	$85,000.00		
2022	2nd	BLAST Premier Fall Final 2022	FaZe Clan	1–2	Heroic	$85,000.00		
2022	2nd	Roobet Cup	FaZe Clan	1–2	BIG	$50,000.00		
2020	2nd	ESL Pro League Season 11 Europe	mousesports	2–3	fnatic	$65,000.00		
2019	2nd	EPICENTER 2019	mousesports	1–2	Vitality	$120,000.00		
2018	2nd	ESL One Belo Horizonte 2018	mousesports	2–3	FaZe Clan	$40,000.00		

=== Majors participation ===
Ever since joining Mousesports in 2017, ropz has only missed out 1 Major in 2019.

#	Tournament	Date	Team	Result
1	PGL Major: Kraków 2017	July 16–23, 2017	mousesports	12th – 14th
2	ELEAGUE Major: Boston 2018	January 19–28, 2018	mousesports	5th – 8th
3	FACEIT Major: London 2018	September 12–23, 2018	mousesports	15th – 16th
–	IEM Katowice Major 2019	February 20 – March 3, 2019	mousesports	DNQ
4	StarLadder Major: Berlin 2019	August 28 – September 8, 2019	mousesports	9th – 11th
5	PGL Major Stockholm 2021	October 26 – November 7, 2021	mousesports	12th – 14th
6	PGL Major Antwerp 2022	May 9–22, 2022	FaZe Clan	1st
7	IEM Rio Major 2022	October 31 – November 13, 2022	FaZe Clan	15th – 16th
8	BLAST Paris Major 2023	May 8–21, 2023	FaZe Clan	5th – 8th
9	PGL Major Copenhagen 2024	Mar 17–31, 2024	FaZe Clan	2nd
10	Perfect World Shanghai Major 2024	Nov 30 – Dec 15, 2024	FaZe Clan	2nd
11	BLAST Austin Major 2025	June 2–22, 2025	Vitality	1st
12	StarLadder Budapest Major 2025	November 24–December 14, 2025	Vitality	1st
13	IEM Cologne Major 2026	June 2-21, 2026	Vitality	5th-8th
