= Paris 2023 =

Paris 2023 may refer to:

- 2023 World Para Athletics Championships
- Blast Paris Major 2023
