= GamerLegion =

Germany-based esports organization

- Short name: GL
- Games: Age of Empires II; Counter-Strike 2; Tekken 8
- Founded: 13 April 2017; 9 years ago
- Location: Stuttgart, Germany
- CEO: Nicolas Reber
- Partners: Backforce; Re-bo
- Website: gamerlegion.gg

GamerLegion (formerly Team GamerLegion) is a German professional esports organization based in Stuttgart. Founded in 2017, it fields teams in Age of Empires II, Counter-Strike 2 and Tekken 8.

The organization's Counter-Strike team rose to prominence after reaching the grand final of the Blast Paris Major 2023. Since then it has competed in international tournaments such as Intel Extreme Masters and BLAST Premier.

== History ==
GamerLegion was founded in April 2017 in Celle, Germany, before relocating to Stuttgart. Initially a coaching platform, in 2018 the organization acquired its first professional roster, competing in League of Legends. In March 2019, GamerLegion signed their first Counter-Strike roster, and signed Tekken player Akhil "Tetsu" Kakar in August 2021.

== Age of Empires II ==
In September 2020, GamerLegion acquired an Age of Empires II roster of former Team Secret players.. As of 2nd Jan 2026, GamerLegion has left Age of Empires II. TheViper alleges that the reason for not renewing his contract with GamerLegion was due to a failure to pay his salary and withholding his prize winnings.

=== Roster ===
{{{team}}} Age of Empires II roster
Players
Coaches

Handle	Name	Nationality
DauT	Dautovic, Darko	Serbia
TaToH	Jiménez, Roberto	Spain
TheViper	Larsen, Ørjan	Norway
Hera	El-Baher, Hamzah	Canada

Head coach

- Vacant

Legend:
- (I) Inactive
- (S) Suspended
- Substitute
- (injured) Injury / Illness

Latest roster transaction: 6 January 2024.

== Counter-Strike ==
GamerLegion signed its first Counter-Strike: Global Offensive team on 29 March 2019, featuring Belgian player Adil "ScreaM" Benrlitom. The organization's various rosters have attended four Counter-Strike Major Championships, IEM Rio Major 2022, Blast Paris Major 2023, PGL Major Copenhagen 2024 and Perfect World Shanghai Major 2024. Their most significant performance was a second-place finish at Paris 2023, where they upset Heroic to qualify for the grand finals against Team Vitality.

=== Roster ===
{{{team}}} Counter-Strike 2 roster
Players
Coaches

Handle	Name	Nationality
REZ	Sterner, Fredrik	Sweden
Tauson	Lindelof, Sebastian Tauson	Denmark
PR	Nový, Oldřich	Czech Republic
hypex	Polowiec, Milan	Poland
Snax	Pogorzelski, Janusz	Poland
ztr (I)	Gustafsson, Erik	Sweden
Kursy (I)	Gast, Jeremy	France

Head coach

Adrian "imd" Pieper

Legend:
- (I) Inactive
- (S) Suspended
- Substitute
- (injured) Injury / Illness

Latest roster transaction: 12 Dec 2025.
