= Karrigan =

Danish esports player

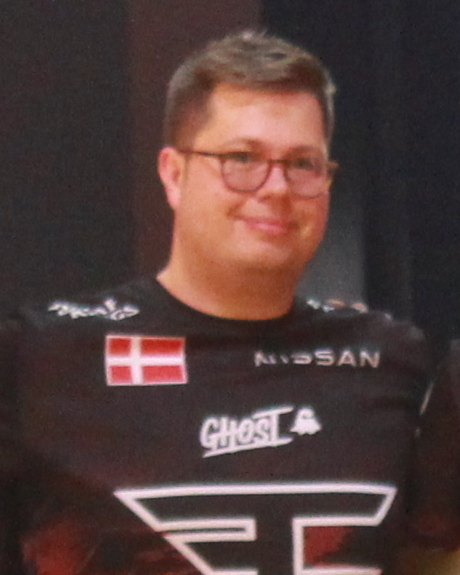
- Karrigan at PGL Major Antwerp 2022

Personal information
- Name: Finn Andersen
- Born: 14 April 1990 (age 36)
- Nationality: Danish, German

Current team
- Team: Team Falcons
- Role: In-Game Leader
- Game: Counter-Strike 2

Career information
- Games: Counter-Strike 1.6; Counter-Strike: Global Offensive; Counter-Strike 2
- Playing career: 2006–present

Team history
- 2012: Fnatic
- 2012–2013: mousesports
- 2013: Fnatic
- 2014: Copenhagen Wolves
- 2014–2015: Team Dignitas
- 2015: Team SoloMid
- 2016: Astralis
- 2016–2019: FaZe Clan
- 2019–2021: mousesports
- 2021–2026: FaZe Clan
- 2026–: Team Falcons

Career highlights and awards
- 2× Counter-Strike Major champion (Antwerp 2022, Cologne 2026); IEM Grand Slam champion (Season 4); 2× HLTV MVP; HLTV IGL of the year (2022)

Finn Andersen (born 14 April 1990), better known as karrigan, is a Danish-German professional Counter-Strike 2 player and in-game leader who plays for Team Falcons. He has also played for other teams including Fnatic, Team Dignitas, Team SoloMid, Astralis, Mousesports and FaZe Clan. Andersen was a founding member of Astralis, a player-owned team established in 2015. He began playing competitively in 2006 during the Counter-Strike 1.6 era. He is widely considered to be one of the best in-game leaders in Counter-Strike history.

== Early and personal life ==
Karrigan's brother started playing Counter-Strike around 2001 and soon afterwards he was introduced to the game. Karrigan was playing competitively by 2006 and 2007 and on 5 November 2010, he joined Full-Gaming, whose teammates included Michael "Friis" Jørgensen and Timm "ArcadioN" Henriksen.

In 2015 he finished a Master's Degree in business administration and auditing from Copenhagen Business School. He currently resides in Aarhus.

On 19 November 2024, Karrigan announced the death of his brother on Twitter prior to the qualifying tournament for the Perfect World Shanghai Major 2024.

== Career ==
Karrigan joined fnatic on 25 March 2012 and won various tournaments with the team. With the advent of the Counter-Strike: Global Offensive scene, he joined mousesports later that year, stating "the offer they gave me was really good, and I felt like the Fnatic lineup did not have what it took to be great in CS:GO".

Karrigan left Copenhagen Wolves and joined the Denmark-based roster of North American organization Team SoloMid.

On January 25, 2015, Team SoloMid picked up Team Dignitas' CS roster. In July SoloMid placed 3-4th the year's second Major, ESL One Cologne 2015. In October TSM got 5-8th at the last Major, DreamHack Open Cluj-Napoca 2015.

TSM's CS:GO roster left the organization on 3 December 2015, amid internal troubles. For the next few tournaments the team competed under the name "Team Question Mark".

=== Astralis ===
On 9 January 2016, Team Question Mark unveiled the new organization they created, Astralis, because of a desire to have a "stable environment" in eSports. The organization was registered as an Anpartsselskab (ApS) and received venture capital from Sunstone Capital, and is angel invested by entrepreneur Tommy Ahlers.

On 5 June 2016, he was denied entry into the United States to compete in the group stage of ELeague Season 1 due to new rules regarding Electronic System for Travel Authorization (ESTA) travel because he had been to Iran within the last five years. During the matches he missed, the team used coach Danny "Zonic" Sørensen in his place. Astralis placed 3-4th at the MLG Major Championship: Columbus in March. In July they got 5-8th at second Major, ESL One Cologne 2016.

=== FaZe Clan ===
Karrigan transferred to FaZe Clan on 19 October 2016. He would leave FaZe Clan in 2019 to join Mousesports. After mixed results with the team, he would transfer back to FaZe as a free agent when his Mousesports contract expired in February 2021.

A year after he joined FaZe Clan, he won IEM Katowice 2022, beating G2 Esports 3-0. Later that year, he would lead his team to win his first CS:GO Major at the age of 32 during the PGL Major Antwerp 2022, becoming the oldest player to do so at the time.

In 26 March 2023, he won ESL Pro League Season 17.

In 2024, Karrigan would again lead FaZe Clan to the finals of both of the 2024 majors, PGL Major Copenhagen 2024 and Perfect World Shanghai Major 2024, but would lose both finals.

After losing to The MongolZ in the quarterfinals of the Austin Major 2025, he once again finished as a runner-up in a major with a revamped FaZe Clan roster at the StarLadder Budapest Major 2025, losing the final to Team Vitality 1-3. FaZe Clan would proceed to miss out on qualifying for the Cologne Major 2026 entirely after a drop in form, marking the first time the organization failed to make a Major. On 20 April 2026, Karrigan would leave FaZe Clan for the second time.

=== Team Falcons ===
On 12 April 2026, rumours began circulating that Karrigan was slated to join Team Falcons, replacing Damjan "kyxsan" Stoilkovski as the team's in-game leader. Eight days later, on 20 April 2026, Team Falcons would officially announce his signing in time for the Cologne Major, as well as the benching of kyxsan. At Cologne, Falcons would finish 3–1 in Stage 3, only losing their 1–0 match against BetBoom, before defeating defending champions Vitality in the Quarterfinals and Team Spirit in the Semifinals, both with 2–1 map scorelines. Falcons would defeat FURIA in the Grand Final in a 3–0 sweep to win their first Major title and Karrigan's second, becoming the oldest to win the Major once again at age 36, surpassing apEX’s previous record.
