= CadiaN =

Danish professional Counter-Strike player

cadiaN

Personal information
- Name: Casper Møller
- Born: 1994 or 1995 (age 31–32); Haderslev, Denmark

Current team
- Team: OG
- Role: AWPer; in-game leader (IGL)
- Game: Counter-Strike 2

Team history
- 2016–2017: Rogue
- 2017–2018: Rogue
- 2018–2019: North
- 2019–2020: Heroic
- 2020: FunPlus Phoenix
- 2020–2023: Heroic
- 2023–2024: Team Liquid
- 2024–2025: Astralis
- 2025–: OG

Casper Møller, known professionally as cadiaN, is a Danish professional Counter-Strike 2 player who presently plays for OG.

== Early life ==
Born in Haderslev, Møller grew up playing football and wanting to become a professional handballer; however, an injury saw him withdraw from the sport, where he then began to play video games.

== Career ==
After playing for the American esports organisation Rogue, cadiaN left in 2018, moving to the Denmark-based organisation North. At North, he spent five months on the bench, and joined TV 2 Zulu's Counter-Strike coverage.

CadiaN joined Heroic in 2019, where he became the team's in-game leader. The team won ESL One Cologne in the summer of 2020, rising to one of the top teams in the world. In August 2020, the team came under investigation for cheating following the team's coach abusing a bug. After more than a year of investigating, the rest of the team was cleared of wrongdoing. His time at Heroic was briefly interrupted at time spent with FunPlus Phoenix, who attempted to purchase the team before the deal fell through.

CadiaN was benched by Heroic in November 2023, following a period of turmoil within the team. Team Liquid announced on 7 December that they signed cadiaN. After rumours began to circulate of Liquid benching him, cadiaN was officially benched by the organisation in June 2024. He later moved to Astralis, a rival organisation of Heroic, in September 2024. During the 2024 Blast Fall Finals, Astralis was accused of faking the illness of a player, which allowed cadiaN to join the team as a substitute. The team was deducted 25% of their prize money from the event. After failing to qualify for the 2025 Austin Major, cadiaN was released by Astralis.

In November 2025, cadiaN was signed by OG.

== Honours ==
Heroic

- ESL One Cologne: 2020
