= PGL Major Antwerp 2022 =

Esports tournament

- 2022
- The PGL Major Antwerp 2022 Logo

Tournament information
- Game: Counter-Strike: Global Offensive
- Location: Antwerp, Belgium
- Dates: 9 May–22 May 2022
- Administrator: Valve; PGL
- Tournament format(s): Two 16-team swiss-system group stages 8-team single-elimination playoff
- Host: PGL
- Venue: Sportpaleis
- Teams: 24 teams
- Defending champions: Natus Vincere
- Purse: US$1,000,000

Final positions
- Champions: FaZe Clan
- 1st runners-up: Natus Vincere
- 2nd runners-up: Team Spirit; ENCE
- MVP: Håvard "rain" Nygaard

The PGL Major Antwerp 2022, also known as PGL Major 2022 or Antwerp 2022, was the seventeenth Counter-Strike: Global Offensive (CS:GO) Major Championship. It was held in Antwerp, Belgium at the Sportpaleis from 9 to 22 May 2022. Twenty-four teams participated, with most qualifying through regional tournaments. It featured a US$1,000,000 prize pool, half of the previous Major. It was the third Major hosted by the Romanian organization PGL, after PGL Major: Kraków 2017 and PGL Major Stockholm 2021. The Major would be won by FaZe Clan, the first international team in CS:GO history to win a Major.

== Background ==
Counter-Strike: Global Offensive is a multiplayer first-person shooter video game developed by Hidden Path Entertainment and Valve Corporation. It is the fourth game in the Counter-Strike series. In professional CS:GO, the Valve-sponsored Majors are the most prestigious tournaments.

The defending Major Champions were Natus Vincere, who won their first Major at Stockholm 2021. Natus Vincere would finish second at the Major, losing to FaZe Clan in the grand finals.

== Format ==
=== Map Pool ===
- Dust II
- Mirage
- Inferno
- Nuke
- Ancient
- Overpass
- Vertigo

== Teams Competing ==
Legends

- Heroic
- Copenhagen Flames
- BIG Clan
- Cloud9 (Note: Cloud9 acquired Gambit Esports's roster due to the organization's owner, MTS, facing sanctions as a result of the 2022 Russian invasion of Ukraine.)
- FaZe Clan
- Ninjas in Pyjamas
- Natus Vincere
- FURIA Esports

Challengers

- ENCE
- G2 Esports
- forZe
- Astralis
- Team Vitality
- Bad News Eagles
- MIBR
- Imperial Esports

Contenders

- Eternal Fire
- Team Spirit
- Outsiders (Note: Due to sanctions against Russia in response to the 2022 Russian invasion of Ukraine, Virtus.pro is competing under a neutral name.)
- Complexity Gaming
- Team Liquid
- 9z Team
- IHC Esports
- Renegades

== New Challengers Stage ==
The New Challengers stage took place from 9 to 12 May 2022. The Challengers stage, also known as the Preliminary stage and formerly known as the offline qualifier, is a sixteen team swiss tournament. Initial seeding was determined using RMR standings, from the 2nd round forward the Buchholz system was used.

Pos	Team	W	L	RW	RL	RD	BH	Qualification
1	G2 Esports	3	0	76	46	+30	5	Qualification to Legends Stage
2	Team Vitality	3	0	83	58	+25	−4	Qualification to Legends Stage
3	ENCE	3	1	81	54	+27	3	Qualification to Legends Stage
4	Team Spirit	3	1	99	83	+16	1	Qualification to Legends Stage
5	Outsiders	3	1	82	76	+6	−2	Qualification to Legends Stage
6	Imperial	3	2	109	90	+19	1	Qualification to Legends Stage
7	Bad News Eagles	3	2	106	108	−2	−1	Qualification to Legends Stage
8	Team Liquid	3	2	112	105	+7	−2	Qualification to Legends Stage
9	forZe	2	3	116	130	−20	4	Eliminated
10	Astralis	2	3	85	95	−10	3	Eliminated
11	MIBR	2	3	109	115	−6	−3	Eliminated
12	Complexity	1	3	65	66	−1	4	Eliminated
13	Eternal Fire	1	3	85	97	−12	−1	Eliminated
14	IHC Esports	1	3	50	77	−27	−5	Eliminated
15	9z Team	0	3	43	64	−21	2	Eliminated
16	Renegades	0	3	33	64	−31	−5	Eliminated

Updated to match(es) played on 12 May 2022. Source: HLTV
Round 1 scores

Round 1 matches
Team	Score	Map	Score	Team
Team Vitality	16	Inferno	L	L
Bad News Eagles	16	Dust II	L	L
G2 Esports	16	Inferno	L	L
forZe	16	Nuke	L	L
Astralis	16	Nuke	L	L
L	L	Dust II	16	Team Spirit
L	L	Dust II	16	Outsiders
ENCE	16	Mirage	L	L

Round 2 scores

Round 2 matches
Team	Score	Map	Score	Team
High division
G2 Esports	19	Dust II	L	L
forZe	16	Inferno	L	L
ENCE	16	Vertigo	L	L
L	L	Mirage	16	Team Vitality
Low division
Eternal Fire	16	Vertigo	L	L
Complexity	16	Nuke	L	L
Imperial	16	Inferno	L	L
MIBR	16	Inferno	L	L

Round 3 scores

Round 3 matches
Team	Score	Map	Score	Team
High division
Team Vitality	2	Series	L	L
L	L	Series	2	G2 Esports
Mid division
Team Spirit	16	Dust II	L	L
Bad News Eagles	16	Vertigo	L	L
Astralis	16	Overpass	L	L
L	L	Overpass	16	Outsiders
Low division
L	L	Series	2	IHC Esports
Team Liquid	2	Series	L	L

Round 4 scores

Round 4 matches
Team	Score	Map	Score	Team
High division
L	L	Series	2	Team Spirit
L	L	Series	2	Outsiders
ENCE	2	Series	L	L
Low division
Imperial	2	Series	L	L
L	L	Series	2	Team Liquid
MIBR	2	Series	L	L

Round 5 scores

Round 5 matches
Team	Score	Map	Score	Team
L	L	Series	2	Team Liquid
Bad News Eagles	2	Series	L	L
L	L	Series	2	Imperial

== New Legends Stage ==
The format of the New Legends stage was the same as the New Challengers stage: a 16-team Swiss-system tournament with the top eight teams advancing to the playoff bracket.

Pos	Team	W	L	RW	RL	RD	BH	Qualification
1	Team Spirit	3	0	74	54	+20	3	Qualification to Champions Stage
2	Natus Vincere	3	0	81	51	+30	−1	Qualification to Champions Stage
3	ENCE	3	1	86	66	+20	2	Qualification to Champions Stage
4	Ninjas in Pyjamas	3	1	90	76	+14	1	Qualification to Champions Stage
5	FaZe Clan	3	1	85	63	+22	−2	Qualification to Champions Stage
6	Copenhagen Flames	3	2	97	109	−12	3	Qualification to Champions Stage
7	Heroic	3	2	127	125	+2	0	Qualification to Champions Stage
8	FURIA	3	2	102	106	−4	−1	Qualification to Champions Stage
9	G2 Esports	2	3	131	133	−2	2	Eliminated
10	Team Vitality	2	3	133	144	-11	−4	Eliminated
11	Imperial	2	3	125	139	-14	−7	Eliminated
12	BIG	1	3	82	97	−15	2	Eliminated
13	Cloud9	1	3	80	94	−14	1	Eliminated
14	Outsiders	1	3	73	82	−9	−2	Eliminated
15	Bad News Eagles	0	3	45	64	−19	2	Eliminated
16	Team Liquid	0	3	38	64	−26	1	Eliminated

Updated to match(es) played on 17 May 2022. Source: HLTV
Round 1 scores

Round 1 matches
Team	Score	Map	Score	Team
Heroic	16	Vertigo	L	L
Copenhagen Flames	16	Ancient	L	L
Ninjas in Pyjamas	16	Overpass	L	L
Cloud9	16	Mirage	L	L
L	L	Mirage	16	ENCE
L	L	Nuke	16	Team Spirit
Natus Vincere	19	Mirage	L	L
BIG	16	Nuke	L	L

Round 2 scores

Round 2 matches
Team	Score	Map	Score	Team
High division
L	L	Nuke	16	Team Spirit
Copenhagen Flames	16	Ancient	L	L
L	L	Ancient	16	Natus Vincere
L	L	Inferno	16	Ninjas in Pyjamas
Low division
L	L	Mirage	16	Outsiders
FaZe Clan	16	Ancient	L	L
FURIA	16	Ancient	L	L
G2 Esports	16	Mirage	L	L

Round 3 scores

Round 3 matches
Team	Score	Map	Score	Team
High division
Team Spirit	2	Series	L	L
Natus Vincere	2	Series	L	L
Mid division
Heroic	19	Vertigo	L	L
ENCE	16	Mirage	L	L
L	L	Vertigo	16	FURIA
L	L	Nuke	16	FaZe Clan
Low division
Team Vitality	2	Series	L	L
L	L	Series	2	Imperial

Round 4 scores

Round 4 matches
Team	Score	Map	Score	Team
High division
L	L	Series	2	FaZe Clan
Ninjas in Pyjamas	2	Series	L	L
ENCE	2	Series	L	L
L	L	Series	2	Team Vitality
G2 Esports	2	Series	L	L
L	L	Series	2	Imperial

Round 5 scores

Round 5 matches
Team	Score	Map	Score	Team
Heroic	2	Series	L	L
L	L	Series	2	FURIA
Copenhagen Flames	2	Series	L	L

== New Champions Stage ==
With eight teams remaining, the final stage of the Major is a single-elimination bracket, with all matches played as best-of-3 maps.

=== Bracket ===
Quarterfinals
1	Team Spirit	16	16	–	2
8	FURIA Esports	12	8	–	0
5	FaZe Clan	16	13	16	2
4	Ninjas in Pyjamas	10	16	8	1
3	ENCE	16	16	–	2
6	Copenhagen Flames	10	12	–	0
2	Natus Vincere	10	16	16	2
7	Heroic	16	14	8	1

Semifinals
Team Spirit	13	23	–	0
FaZe Clan	16	25	–	2
ENCE	7	12	–	0
Natus Vincere	16	16	–	2

Finals
FaZe Clan	19	16	–	2
Natus Vincere	16	10	–	0

=== Quarterfinals ===
==== FaZe Clan vs. Ninjas in Pyjamas ====
Casters: Scrawny & launders

FaZe Clan vs. Ninjas in Pyjamas scores
Team	Score	Map	Score	Team
FaZe Clan	16	Nuke	L	L
L	L	Overpass	16	Ninjas in Pyjamas
FaZe Clan	16	Inferno	L	L

==== FURIA Esports vs. Team Spirit ====
Casters: JustHarry & Hugo

FURIA Esports vs. Team Spirit scores
Team	Score	Map	Score	Team
L	L	Vertigo	16	Team Spirit
L	L	Ancient	16	Team Spirit
FURIA Esports	–	Mirage	–	Team Spirit

==== Copenhagen Flames vs. ENCE ====
Casters: Vince & Bleh

Copenhagen Flames vs. ENCE scores
Team	Score	Map	Score	Team
L	L	Vertigo	16	ENCE
L	L	Nuke	16	ENCE
Copenhagen Flames	–	Ancient	–	ENCE

==== Heroic vs. Natus Vincere ====
Casters: Machine & SPUNJ

Heroic vs. Natus Vincere scores
Team	Score	Map	Score	Team
Heroic	16	Inferno	L	L
L	L	Ancient	16	Natus Vincere
L	L	Nuke	16	Natus Vincere

=== Semifinals ===
==== Team Spirit vs. FaZe Clan ====
Casters: JustHarry & Hugo

Team Spirit vs. FaZe Clan scores
Team	Score	Map	Score	Team
L	L	Mirage	16	FaZe Clan
L	L	Dust II	25	FaZe Clan
Team Spirit	–	Nuke	–	FaZe Clan

==== Natus Vincere vs. ENCE ====
Casters: Scrawny & launders

Natus Vincere vs. ENCE scores
Team	Score	Map	Score	Team
Natus Vincere	16	Nuke	L	L
Natus Vincere	16	Dust II	L	L
Natus Vincere	–	Mirage	–	ENCE

=== Finals ===
==== FaZe Clan vs. Natus Vincere ====
Casters: Machine & SPUNJ

FaZe Clan vs. Natus Vincere scores
Team	Score	Map	Score	Team
FaZe Clan	19	Inferno	L	L
FaZe Clan	16	Nuke	L	L
FaZe Clan	–	Ancient	–	Natus Vincere

== Final standings ==
The final placings are shown below. In addition, the prize distribution, seed for the next major, roster, and coaches are shown.

Place	Prize Money	Team	Seed	Roster	Coach
1st	US$500,000	FaZe Clan	IEM Road to Rio 2022 RMR	rain, broky, Twistzz, karrigan, ropz	Eddie
2nd	US$150,000	Natus Vincere	IEM Road to Rio 2022 RMR	s1mple, electronic, Boombl4, Perfecto, b1t	B1ad3
3rd – 4th	US$70,000	Team Spirit	IEM Road to Rio 2022 RMR	chopper, magixx, degster, Patsi, S1ren	–
3rd – 4th	US$70,000	ENCE	IEM Road to Rio 2022 RMR	Snappi, Spinx, dycha, hades, maden	sAw
5th – 8th	US$35,000	FURIA Esports	IEM Road to Rio 2022 RMR	yuurih, arT, KSCERATO, drop, saffee	tacitus
5th – 8th	US$35,000	Ninjas in Pyjamas	IEM Road to Rio 2022 RMR	REZ, Plopski, hampus, es3tag, Brollan	djL
5th – 8th	US$35,000	Copenhagen Flames	IEM Road to Rio 2022 RMR	jabbi, nicoodoz, roeJ, HooXi, Zyphon	vorborg
5th – 8th	US$35,000	Heroic	IEM Road to Rio 2022 RMR	stavn, cadiaN, TeSeS, refrezh, sjuush	Xizt
9th – 11th	US$8,750	G2 Esports	IEM Road to Rio 2022 RMR	JaCkz, huNter-, NiKo, m0NESY, Aleksib	XTQZZZ
9th – 11th	US$8,750	Team Vitality	IEM Road to Rio 2022 RMR	apEX, ZywOo, misutaaa, dupreeh, Magisk	zonic
9th – 11th	US$8,750	Imperial Esports	IEM Road to Rio 2022 RMR	FalleN, fer, fnx, boltz, VINI	–
12th – 14th	US$8,750	Cloud9	IEM Road to Rio 2022 RMR	nafany, sh1ro, Ax1Le, interz, HObbit	groove
12th – 14th	US$8,750	BIG	IEM Road to Rio 2022 RMR	tabseN, tiziaN, syrsoN, faveN, Krimbo	gob b
12th – 14th	US$8,750	Outsiders	IEM Road to Rio 2022 RMR	buster, qikert, Jame, YEKINDAR, FL1T	dastan
15th – 16th	US$8,750	Bad News Eagles	–	SENER1, gxx-, juanflatroo, sinnopsyy, rigoN	stikle-
15th – 16th	US$8,750	Team Liquid	–	EliGE, NAF, oSee, shox, nitr0	adreN
17th – 19th	–	forZe	–	Jerry, KENSi, zorte, Norwi, shalfey	Fierce
17th – 19th	–	Astralis	–	Xyp9x, gla1ve, blameF, Farlig, k0nfig	trace
17th – 19th	–	MIBR	–	chelo, exit, WOOD7, Tuurtle, JOTA	BIT
20th – 22nd	–	Complexity Gaming	–	JT, FaNg, floppy, Grim, junior	T.c
20th – 22nd	–	Eternal Fire	–	XANTARES, woxic, Calyx, imoRR, xfl0ud	bishop
20th – 22nd	–	IHC Esports	–	bLitz, Techno4K, kabal, nin9, sk0R	maaRaa
23rd – 24th	–	Renegades	–	sico, ins, hatz, aliStair, Liazz	Kingfisher
23rd – 24th	–	9z Team	–	dgt, max, rox, luken, dav1d	–
