= Perfecto (gamer) =

Russian esports player

Personal information
- Name: Илья Игоревич Залуцкий (Ilya Igorevich Zalutskiy)
- Born: 24 November 1999 (age 26)
- Nationality: Russian

Current team
- Team: None
- Role: In-Game Leader
- Games: Counter-Strike: Global Offensive; Counter-Strike 2

Career information
- Playing career: 2017–present

Team history
- 2017–2018: Atlants
- 2018–2020: Syman Gaming
- 2020–2023: Natus Vincere
- 2023–2025: Cloud9 (Note: Inactive between April 2024 and April 2025.)
- 2025–2026: Virtus.pro

Career highlights and awards
- CS:GO Major champion (Stockholm 2021)

Ilya Igorevich Zalutskiy (Russian: Илья Игоревич Залуцкий), better known by his in‑game name Perfecto, is a Russian professional esports player who last competed in Counter-Strike 2 for Virtus.pro. He is a champion of the PGL Major Stockholm 2021 as a member of Natus Vincere.

== Early life and career ==
Ilya Zalutskiy was born on November, 24, 1999.

In January 2020, Perfecto joined Natus Vincere, replacing GuardiaN. Signed from Syman Gaming after a strong showing at the StarLadder Major: Berlin 2019, he quickly integrated into the lineup as a reliable rifler.

Perfecto joined Cloud9's newly assembled CS:GO roster in August 2023.
