= Heroic (esports) =

European professional esports organisation

HEROIC
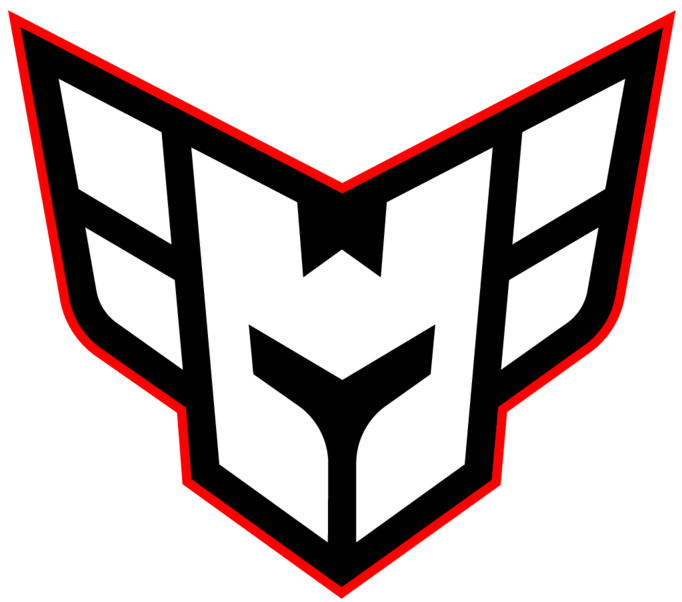
- Divisions: Counter-Strike 2 Dota 2
- Founded: 26 August 2016; 10 years ago
- Location: Oslo, Norway
- CEO: Joachim Harg
- Partners: BenQ, Razed
- Website: heroic.gg

Heroic (stylized as HEROIC) is a Norwegian esports organization with teams competing in Counter-Strike 2 and Dota 2.

The esports organization is best known for its Counter-Strike team, and has made it to the playoffs of PGL Major Stockholm 2021, PGL Major Antwerp 2022, Blast.tv Paris Major 2023 and Perfect World Shanghai Major 2024.

They also placed 2nd at IEM Rio Major 2022, losing to Outsiders (Note: Due to sanctions against Russia in response to the 2022 Russian invasion of Ukraine, Virtus.pro competed under a neutral name.) in the grand finals.

== Counter-Strike: Global Offensive ==
=== History ===
The organization was founded in Denmark on 26 August 2016, with the initial roster being composed of future Astralis in-game leader Lukas "gla1ve" Rossander, Michael "Friis" Jørgensen, Valdemar "valde" Vangså, Marco "Snappi" Pfeiffer, and Andreas "MODDII" Fridh. They became a part of RFRSH Entertainment before being sold to Seranades Global in 2018. In February 2021, Heroic was acquired by Norwegian organization Omaken Sports.

On 11 April 2022, Heroic won ESL Pro League Season 13 and qualified for the BLAST Premier World Final 2021 after Casper "cadiaN" Møller won a one-versus-four against Gambit Esports in the grand finals of the tournament. Shortly after, the team announced that it had purchased a member team spot in BLAST Premier. The team is also partnered with tournament organizer ESL, with a guaranteed spot in the ESL Pro League.

At the PGL Major Antwerp 2022, Heroic made it to the quarterfinals before losing to Natus Vincere.

At the IEM Rio Major 2022, Heroic reached the finals, but lost to Outsiders.

Heroic reached the semifinals of the Blast.tv Paris Major 2023, losing 1-2 to GamerLegion in an upset.

Following a 4-6th place finish at the BLAST Premier Spring Groups 2023 on 29 January 2023, Heroic qualified for the Spring Finals, where they came first following a 2-1 victory over Team Vitality.

=== Achievements ===
- 1st – DreamHack Open Atlanta 2019
- 1st – ESL One Cologne 2020 Europe
- 1st – ESL Pro League Season 13-qualified for BLAST Premier World Finals 2021
- 3rd/4th – PGL Major Stockholm 2021
- 3rd/4th – Intel Extreme Masters XVI Katowice
- 1st – Pinnacle Winter Series 3
- 1st – PGL Major Antwerp 2022 Europe RMR A
- 5-8th – PGL Major Antwerp 2022
- 2nd – IEM Rio Major 2022
- 1st – BLAST Premier Fall Final 2022
- 2nd – IEM Katowice 2023
- 2nd – IEM Rio 2023
- 3-4th – Blast.tv Paris Major 2023
- 1st – BLAST Premier Spring Final 2023

== Counter-Strike 2 ==
=== Current roster ===
Heroic Counter-Strike 2 roster
Players
Coaches

Handle	Name	Nationality
Chr1zN	Storgaard, Christoffer	Denmark
susp	Ångström, Tim	Sweden
nilo	Bergman, Linus	Sweden
MartinezSa	Martinez, Antonio	Spain
Brollan	Brolin, Ludvig	Sweden
xfl0ud (I)	Koç, Yasin	Turkey
yxngstxr (I)	Boije, Simon	Sweden
Alkaren (I)	Bitimbai, Alimzhan	Kazakhstan

Head coach

Joonas "doto" Forss

Legend:
- (I) Inactive
- (S) Suspended
- Substitute
- (injured) Injury / Illness

Latest roster transaction: 7 July 2026.

=== History ===
On 4 October 2023, Heroic announced the benching of cadiaN. He was replaced by Peter "dupreeh" Rasmussen on October 23, signing until the end of 2023. Two days later, on 25 October, Heroic announced the temporary benchings of Martin "stavn" Lund and Jakob "jabbi" Nygaard following claims that the pair allegedly demanded the removal of cadiaN in exchange for contract extensions, before communicating their intentions to join Astralis. The players were replaced by MOUZ academy players William "sirah" Kjærsgaard and Christoffer "Chr1zN" Storgaard for Thunderpick World Championship 2023 and Roobet Cup 2023, where the team finished 5-8th and 9-12th respectively.

On 30 October 2023, ahead of Blast Premier Fall Final 2023, Heroic announced that cadiaN would return to the roster for the tournament as a stand-in. Two days later, Heroic confirmed their roster for the event, after naming Rasmus "Zyphon" Nordfoss as a stand-in, signing on loan from Sprout. Heroic lost in the opening round of the tournament in a 2-0 loss against Team Vitality, before defeating Astralis to qualify for the quarter-finals. They were then eliminated after losing to Cloud9.

Jabbi and stavn transferred to Astralis on 24 November 2023.

Heroic announced the loan signing of Jason "salazar" Salazar, along with the continued loan of Zyphon, for Blast Premier World Final 2023. Following the elimination of Heroic by MOUZ, dupreeh became a free agent after his contract with the team expired.

Team Liquid signed cadiaN on 6 December 2023. Later that month, on 12 December, Heroic announced the departure of Xizt. He was replaced on 16 December 2023 by previous ENCE coach Eetu "sAw" Saha. The Finnish coach would be joined by former ENCE teammate Guy "NertZ" Iluz the next day. The organization announced the signing of Nico "nicoodoz" Tamjidi on 18 December 2023. Heroic completed its roster rebuild on 21 December 2023 after the transfer of Damjan "kyxsan" Stoilkovski. On 12 May 2024, nicoodoz was replaced by Abdul "degster" Gasanov.

Following the end of the 2024 season, Heroic once again underwent a rebuild following the acquisition of degster, kyxsan and TeSeS by Team Falcons on 4 January 2025, and NertZ's departure to Team Liquid on 6 January 2025. Heroic announced the departure of sjuush on 8 January 2025. On 10 January 2025, Heroic announced the signing of Sangal's core, featuring Swedish players Linus "LNZ" Holtäng and Simon "yxngstxr" Boije, as well as Turkish player Yasin "xfl0ud" Koç, in addition to Álvaro "SunPayus" García and Andrey "tN1R" Tatarinovich. Heroic also named Linus "nilo" Bergman and Pavle "Maden" Bošković as substitutes ahead of Blast Bounty Season 1.
