= Ence (esports) =

Finnish esports organization

ENCE
- Divisions: Counter-Strike 2; Fortnite; NHL; Overwatch 2; Rainbow Six Siege
- Founded: 2013
- Folded: 2026
- Based in: Helsinki, Finland
- Website: ence.gg

Ence (stylized as ENCE) was a Finnish esports organization with teams and players competing in Counter-Strike 2, PUBG: Battlegrounds, StarCraft II, and NHL 22. ENCE was founded in 2013 and the organization takes inspiration for its name from the Enceladus of Greek mythology. It was based in Helsinki and was the most popular esports organization in Finland. The organization also competed in Hearthstone and Overwatch until 2018, and in League of Legends for the 2020 season. ENCE is best known for its success in StarCraft II and CS:GO. Serral was the first non-Korean to win a StarCraft II World Championship and the CS:GO team finished second at IEM Katowice Major 2019.

On 26 October 2026, the organization filed for bankruptcy and ceased its operations in esports.

== Counter-Strike ==
=== Counter-Strike: Global Offensive ===
ENCE was founded in 2013 and picked up a Finnish CS:GO team which competed in local tournaments. In July 2014, the team disbanded after a series of disappointing results and did not return to CS:GO until 2016. The organization fielded multiple Finnish lineups for the next two years but did not have a stable roster until April 2018, when the organization signed Aleksi "allu" Jalli, Aleksi "Aleksib" Virolainen, Jani "Aerial" Jussila, Jere "sergej" Salo, and Sami "xseveN" Laasanen. The roster of young talent went on an unexpected Cinderella run at IEM Katowice Major 2019 before finally losing in the finals to Astralis. During the Major the team's unlikely success made them a fan favorite among neutrals and in Finland. The Verkkars, a Finnish musical duo, released a song called "EZ4ENCE", titled after the team's chant; it references players, coaches, and team memes. "EZ4ENCE" went viral in Finland during the tournament, eventually becoming the fourth-most-popular song in a Finnish top 50 published by Spotify. The song would later be added into the game by Valve. ENCE remained one of the top CS:GO teams in 2019, winning BLAST Pro Series Madrid and finishing second at DreamHack Masters Dallas and IEM Chicago.

IEM Katowice 2019 remains ENCE's best performance at a CS:GO Major, although they reached the playoff round of StarLadder Major: Berlin 2019 and the semifinals of PGL Major Antwerp 2022.

The team's results worsened at the start of 2020 and ENCE gradually replaced all of the players from the IEM Katowice run with an international roster. In February 2022, with the release of Joonas "doto" Forss, ENCE's roster was completely non-Finnish for the first time in the organization's history. The team instead set up a Finnish academy team. Shortly after, ENCE partnered with ESL, receiving a guaranteed spot in the ESL Pro League. The new roster has reached the top-5 of HLTV's world rankings.

ENCE won their first trophy in over four years after beating MOUZ in the grand finals of IEM Dallas 2023, where Alvaro "SunPayus" García would claim his first MVP title. The team would continue their strong form with grand final appearances in their following two tournaments, IEM Cologne 2023 and Gamers8 2023.

ENCE also attended ESL Pro League Season 18, where they placed 3-4th after being eliminated in the semi-finals by MOUZ.

=== Counter-Strike 2 ===
On 26 November 2023, ENCE announced the departures of coach Eetu "sAw" Saha and in-game leader Marco "Snappi" Pfeiffer, who were replaced by Jakub "kuben" Gurczynski and Lukas "gla1ve" Rossander respectively. Later, on 16 December 2023, the team announced the departures of Alvaro "SunPayus" Garcia and Pavle "Maden" Bošković, who were signed by Saudi Arabian organization Team Falcons, along with Snappi the day prior. Heroic announced the signing of Guy "NertZ" Iluz on 17 December 2023, reducing ENCE's roster to only gla1ve and Paweł "dycha" Dycha.

The same day, ENCE announced the signing of the Polish roster 9INE's core, consisting of Krzysztof "Goofy" Górski, Kacper "Kylar" Walukiewicz, and previous ENCE player Olek "hades" Miskiewicz.

=== Roster ===
ENCE Counter-Strike 2 roster
Players
Coaches

Handle	Name	Nationality
Cliqq	Kinnunen, Niki	Finland
HENU	Ylilehto, Henri	Finland
millert	Lehtopuu, Aleksi	Finland
Schwarz	Gakhokidze, Giorgi	Georgia
teme	Korva, Teemu	Finland
podi (I)	Heiskanen, Paavo	Finland
Neityu (I)	Aubry, Ryan	France
kRaSnaL (I)	Mrozek, Szymon	Poland

Head coach

Aleksi "allu" Jalli

Legend:
- (I) Inactive
- (S) Suspended
- Substitute
- (injured) Injury / Illness

Roster updated 30 June 2026.

== StarCraft II ==
Serral, a Finnish Zerg player, joined ENCE in October 2016 and is one of the best players in the world. In 2018, Serral became the first non-Korean player to win a StarCraft II World Championship.

== NHL esports ==
Finnish player Erik "EKI" Tammenpää represents ENCE in NHL esports. EKI is the most successful Finnish player in the game and one of the top players globally. He was chosen by the Finnish Association of Sports Journalists as the 2021 Finnish esport athlete of the year.

== Overwatch ==
Ence rostered an Overwatch division from 2017 to 2018. In March 2024, the organization announced their return to Overwatch esports, competing in the Overwatch Champions Series.

=== Roster ===
ENCE Overwatch 2 roster
Players
Coaches

Handle	Name	Nationality
Kai	Collins, Kai	United Kingdom
kevster	Persson, Kevin	Sweden
Vestola	Vestola, Ilari	Finland
Chase	Okseschenko, Oleksandr	Ukraine
Skai	Lupsa, Robert	Romania
WMaimone	Maimone, William	Wales
Kellex	Keller, Kristian	Denmark

Head coach

- Vacant

Legend:
- (I) Inactive
- (S) Suspended
- Substitute
- (injured) Injury / Illness

Roster updated 3 September 2024.
