= PGL Major Singapore 2026 =

Counter-Strike 2 tournament

- 2026

Tournament information
- Game: Counter-Strike 2
- Location: Kallang, Singapore
- Dates: November 25–December 13, 2026
- Administrator: Valve; PGL
- Format: Three 16-team Swiss-system group stages 8-team single-elimination playoff
- Host: PGL
- Venue: Singapore Indoor Stadium
- Teams: 32
- Defending champions: Team Falcons
- Purse: US$1,250,000

The PGL Major Singapore 2026 will be the sixth Counter-Strike 2 Major Championship and twenty-fifth Counter-Strike Major overall. It will be held in Singapore from November 25 to December 13, 2026, with the playoffs held at the Singapore Indoor Stadium. The Major will involve 32 teams, with each team directly invited to the event. It will feature a prize pool of US$1,250,000.

== Background ==
Counter-Strike 2 is a multiplayer first-person shooter video game developed by Valve Corporation. It is the fifth game in the Counter-Strike series. In professional Counter-Strike, the Valve-sponsored Majors are considered the most prestigious tournaments.

The Major was announced December 8, 2025, and will be the fifth organized by PGL, after last hosting Copenhagen 2024.

Team Falcons are the Major's defending champions, following a 3–0 victory over FURIA Esports at Cologne 2026.

== Format ==
The tournament involves three Swiss-system group stages before an eight-team single-elimination playoffs. The Major will feature 32 teams directly invited according to their Valve Regional Standings (VRS). Eight teams are eliminated from each Swiss-system stage before the final eight teams compete in a single-elimination playoff bracket to determine a champion. Each match after the initial matchups of each stage and the initial matchups of the Playoffs Stage are seeded according to teams' Buchholz score.

In the first two stages, all matches except for progression or elimination matches, which are played as bests-of-three, are played in a best-of-one format. All Stage 3 matches were played as best-of-three series. Each match in the Playoffs Stage before the grand final is played in a best-of-three format, with the final being a best-of-five. For the first time, the Major will feature a decider match for third-place.

=== Map pool ===
On June 22, 2026, Valve announced the replacement of Overpass with Cache in the Active Duty map pool used for Majors, its first appearance since Katowice 2019, with the change happening on July 6, 2026.

- Ancient
- Anubis
- Cache
- Dust II
- Inferno
- Mirage
- Nuke

== Talent ==
PGL announced the talent for the Major on November 20, 2026.

=== Hosts ===
- Richard Lewis (desk host)
- Sam "Tech Girl" Wright (desk host)
- James Banks (stage host)
- Pala "Pala" Gilroy Sen (sideline reporter)

=== Analysts ===
- Alex "Mauisnake" Ellenberg
- Janko "YNk" Paunović
- Dustin "dusT" Mouret
- Jacob "Pimp" Winneche

=== Casters ===
- Jason "moses" O'Toole
- Adam "Dinko" Hawthorne
- Harry "JustHarry" Russell
- Hugo Byron
- Conner "Scrawny" Girvan
- Mohan "launders" Govindasamy
- Chad "SPUNJ" Burchill
- Alex "Machine" Richardson

== Teams ==
=== Qualification ===
Invites to the Major were distributed to each region according to their performance at Cologne 2026, with the number for each region past Stage 1 determined by the number of teams of each region that advanced to the next Stage. The 12 highest ranked European teams in the Valve Regional Standings (VRS) were invited to Stages 2 and 3, with six in each stage. As TYLOO advanced to Stage 2 at Cologne, Asia regains its Stage 2 slot, but loses its Stage 3 invite as they did not advance further. The Americas region gains two Stage 3 invites due to the advancement of FURIA and 9z Team but only retains a single Stage 2 slot. The distribution of Stage 1 invites remains the same as in Cologne.

=== Invites ===
PGL confirmed the invited teams on November 9, 2026, though due to Singapore not allowing unlicensed gambling brands to be promoted at events, several team names have been changed as noted below.

Region	Qualified Stage		
Region	Stage 1	Stage 2	Stage 3
Europe	Ninjas in Pyjamas; PVISION (Note: PARIVISION is competing as PVISION to comply with Singapore's gambling laws.); HEROIC; FaZe Clan; Eternal Fire; 100 Thieves	FUT Esports; Nemiga Gaming; G2 Esports; THE ONE (Note: 1win Team is competing as THE ONE to comply with Singapore's gambling laws.); Natus Vincere; Astralis	MOUZ; Team Vitality; Aurora Gaming; Team Spirit; BB Team (Note: BetBoom Team is competing as BB Team to comply with Singapore's gambling laws.); Team Falcons
Americas	Team Liquid; 9z Team; M80; DENDELE; Imperial Esports; Wildcard	MIBR	FURIA Esports; Legacy
Asia	GOSH (Note: BC.Game is competing as GOSH to comply with Singapore's gambling laws.); FlyQuest; Chinggis Warriors; Lynn Vision	The MongolZ	—N/a

=== Rosters ===
Below are the rosters for each team, as confirmed on November 9, 2026.

==== Legends ====
The Legends rosters includes the eight teams directly invited to Stage 3 of the Major.

Legends Team Rosters
Team Name	Core Roster	Coach	Substitute Player
MOUZ	Oldřich "PR" Nový; Lotan "Spinx" Giladi; Ádám "torzsi" Torzsás; Adrian "xelex" Vincze; Dorian "xertioN" Berman	Dennis "sycrone" Nielsen	Nikolai "Nikodeon" Sørensen
Team Vitality	Shahar "flameZ" Shushan; ~~Justinas "jL" Lekavicius~~; William "mezii" Merriman; Robin "ropz" Kool; Mathieu "ZywOo" Herbaut	Rémy "XTQZZZ" Quoniam	Dan "apEX" Madesclaire (replaced jL)
Aurora Gaming	Jimi "Jimpphat" Salo; Damjan "kyxsan" Stoilkovski; Ali "Wicadia" Haydar Yalçın; Özgür "woxic" Eker; Ismailcan "XANTARES" Dörtkardeş	Ashley "ash" Battye	—N/a
Team Spirit	Danil "donk" Kryshkovets; Boris "magixx" Vorobiev; Dmitry "sh1ro" Sokolov; Andrey "tN1R" Tatarinovich; Myroslav "zont1x" Plakhotia	Sergey "hally" Shavaev	Dmitry "S0tF1k" Forostyanko
BB Team	Kirill "Boombl4" Mikhailov; Daniil "d1Ledez" Kustov; Kirill "Magnojez" Rodnov; Pavel "S1ren" Ogloblin; Aleksandr "zorte" Zagodyrenko	Artem "Fierce" Ivanov	Damir "dmrr" Abulkasimov
Team Falcons	Finn "karrigan" Andersen; Maksim "kyuosuke" Lukin; Ilya "m0NESY" Osipov; Nikola "NiKo" Kovač; René "TeSeS" Madsen	Danny "zonic" Sørensen	Matej "NucleonZ" Trajkoski
FURIA Esports	Gabriel "FalleN" Toledo; Kaike "KSCERATO" Cerato; Danil "molodoy" Golubenko; Mareks "YEKINDAR" Gaļinskis; Yuri "yuurih" Santos	Sid "sidde" Macedo	—N/a
Legacy	Andrei "arT" Piovezan; Eduardo "dumau" Wolkmer; Bruno "latto" Rebelatto; ~~Vinicius "n1ssim" Pereira~~; Santino "try" Rigal	Alan "adrrr" Riveros	Italo "ksloks" Meinberg (replaced n1ssim)

==== Challengers ====
The Challengers rosters includes the eight teams directly invited to Stage 2 of the Major.

Challengers Team Rosters
Team Name	Core Roster	Coach	Substitute Player
FUT Esports	~~Nikita "cmtry" Samolotov~~; Dmytro "dem0n" Myroshnychenko; Džiugas "dziugss" Steponavičius; Aulon "Krabeni" Fazlija; Yasin "xfl0ud" Koç	András "coolio" Fercsák	Álvaro "SunPayus" García (replaced cmtry)
Nemiga Gaming	Aleksandr "KaiR0N-" Anashkin; Beksultan "khaN" Ospan; Nikita "robo" Dushin; Daniel "syph0" Ageyev; Kirill "Xant3r" Kononov	Anton "boX" Burko	—N/a
G2 Esports	Nikita "HeavyGod" Martynenko; Nemanja "huNter-" Kovač; Matúš "MATYS" Šimko; Guy "NertZ" Iluz; Artem "r1nkle" Moroz	Eetu "sAw" Saha	Vilius "tAk" Keserauskas
THE ONE	Artem "ArtFr0st" Kharitonov; Sergey "Ax1Le" Rykhtorov; Andrey "BELCHONOKK" Yasinskiy; Petr "fame" Bolyshev; Vladislav "nafany" Gorshkov	Konstantin "groove" Pikiner	"xe edo"
Natus Vincere	Aleksi "Aleksib" Virolainen; Valeriy "b1t" Vakhovskiy; Mihai "iM" Ivan; Drin "makazze" Shaqiri; Ihor "w0nderful" Zhdanov	Andrey "B1ad3" Gorodenskiy	David "FAZERY" Procházka
Astralis	~~Jakob "jabbi" Nygaard~~; Love "phzy" Smidebrant; Gytis "ryu" Glušauskas; Kamil "siuhy" Szkaradek; Victor "Staehr" Staehr	Filip "NEO" Kubski	Anton "Anlelele" Huynh (replaced jabbi)
MIBR	Felipe "insani" Yuji; Linus "LNZ" Holtäng; Lucas "nqz" Soares; Tomas "tomaszin" Corna; Carlos "venomzera" Eduardo	Nestor "LETN1" Tanić	—N/a
The MongolZ	Usukhbayar "910" Banzragch; Garidmagnai "bLitz" Byambasuren; Anarbileg "cobrazera" Uuganbayar; Yesuntumur "nin9" Gantulga; Sodbayar "Techno4K" Munkhbold	Erdenedalai "maaRaa" Bayanbat	—N/a

==== Contenders ====
The Challengers rosters includes the sixteen teams directly invited to Stage 1 of the Major.

Contenders Team Rosters
Team Name	Core Roster	Coach	Substitute Player
Ninjas in Pyjamas	Adam "adamb" Ångström; Karim "Krimbo" Moussa; Rasmus "sjuush" Beck; Martin "stavn" Lund; Kacper "xKacpersky" Gabara	Richard "Xizt" Landström	—N/a
PVISION	Evgenii "FL1T" Lebedev; Abay "HObbit" Khassenov; Dzhami "Jame" Ali; Vladislav "xiELO" Lysov; Ivan "zweih" Gogin	Dastan "dastan" Akbayev	Vyacheslav "slaxejezzz" Vinokurov
HEROIC	Ludvig "Brollan" Brolin; Christoffer "Chr1zN" Storgaard; Antonio "MartinezSa" Martinez; Linus "nilo" Bergman; Tim "susp" Ångström	Marco "Snappi" Pfeiffer	—N/a
FaZe Clan	David "frozen" Čerňanský; Jason "JBOEN" Boe Nielsen; Jakub "jcobbb" Pietruszewski; Ryan "Neityu" Aubry; Russel "Twistzz" Van Dulken	Niclas "enkay J" Krumhorn	Dominik "GruBy" Swiderski
Eternal Fire	Samet "jottAAA" Köklü; Vladyslav "Kvem" Korol; Gareth "MisteM" Ries; Iulian "regali" Harjău; Caner "soulfly" Kesici	Sezgin "Fabre" Kalaycı	Emirhan "Hydro2K" Deniz
100 Thieves	Nicolai "device" Reedtz; Jack "Gizmy" von Spreckelsen; Alex "poiii" Nyholm Sundgren; Håvard "rain" Nygaard; William "sirah" Kjærsgaard	Lukas "gla1ve" Rossander	—N/a
Team Liquid	Jonathan "EliGE" Jablonowski; Georgi "Jorko" Mitev; Johnny "JT" Theodosiou; Mario "malbsMd" Samayoa; Keith "NAF-FLY" Markovic	Viktor "flashie" Tamás Bea	—N/a
9z Team	Franco "dgt" Garcia; Matias "HUASOPEEK" Ibañez Hernandez; Luciano "luchov" Herrera; Maximiliano "max" Gonzalez; ~~Ignacio "meyern" Meyer~~	Bruno "BIT" Fukuda Lima	Allan "history" Lawrenz (replaced meyern)
M80	Josh "JBa" Barutt; Mason "Lake" Sanderson; Elias "s1n" Stein; Fritz "slaxz-" Dietrich; Michael "Swisher" Schmid	Rory "dephh" Jackson	Jack "M0nstr" Vopat
DENDELE	Danilo "doc" Barros; Victor "gafolo" Andrade; João "koala" Pfeffer; Máximo "maxxkor" Cortina; Daniel "rdnzao" Monteiro	Hélder "coachi" Sancho	Cristiano "D10S" Marques Sá Carvalho
Imperial Esports	Marcelo "chelo" Cespedes; Lucas "decenty" Bacelar; Kaiky "noway" Santos; Guilherme "saadzin" Pacheco; Vinicius "VINI" Figueiredo	Marcos "tacitus" Castilho	—N/a
Wildcard	Marcos "Cxzi" Castilho; Sebastian "fr3nd" Kuśmierz; Jadan "HexT" Postma; Nemanja "nEMANHA" Đukić; Ethan "reck" Serrano	Łukasz "splawik" Jahns	—N/a
GOSH	Tyson "asap" Paterson; Emil "Magisk" Reif; Ayush "mzinho" Batbold; Oleksandr "s1mple" Kostyliev; Azbayar "Senzu" Munkhbold	Wiktor "TaZ" Wojtas	Hansel "BnTeT" Ferdinand
FlyQuest	Alistair "aliStair" Johnston; Joshua "INS" Potter; Justin "jks" Savage; Corey "nettik" Browne; Declan "Vexite" Portelli	Aaron "AZR" Ward	—N/a
Chinggis Warriors	Sodbileg "cool4st" Batbaatar; Davaasuren "fury5k" Ganbaatar; Undrakhbayar "ROUX" Zolbayar; Tengis "sk0r" Batjargal; Zolbayar "tikuak" Chimedtseren	Munkh-ochir "Redka" Myagmarsuren	—N/a
Lynn Vision	Qihao "C4LLM3SU3" Su; Junjie "EmiliaQAQ" Tang; Lizhi "Starry" Ye; Zhe "Westmelon" Niu; Sike "z4KR" Zhang	Yifei "GUM" Dai	—N/a

== Stage 1 ==
Stage 1 will feature sixteen directly invited teams based on their global Valve Regional Standings, competing in a Swiss-system bracket. Teams will be initially seeded according to their Valve Regional Standing, with further matches seeded according to a team's Buchholz score. Teams with equal Buchholz scores will be seeded according to their initial place in Round 1.

Sixteen teams competed for eight Stage 2 spots, with all matches besides elimination and progression matches, which are best-of-three, being best-of-one.

Pos	Team	W	L	RW	RL	RD	BS	Qualification
1	PVISION	—	—	—	—	—	—	Qualification to Stage 2
2	Liquid	—	—	—	—	—	—	Qualification to Stage 2
3	Ninjas in Pyjamas	—	—	—	—	—	—	Qualification to Stage 2
4	HEROIC	—	—	—	—	—	—	Qualification to Stage 2
5	FaZe	—	—	—	—	—	—	Qualification to Stage 2
6	100 Thieves	—	—	—	—	—	—	Qualification to Stage 2
7	Eternal Fire	—	—	—	—	—	—	Qualification to Stage 2
8	M80	—	—	—	—	—	—	Qualification to Stage 2
9	9z	—	—	—	—	—	—	
10	DENDELE	—	—	—	—	—	—	
11	Imperial	—	—	—	—	—	—	
12	Wildcard	—	—	—	—	—	—	
13	GOSH	—	—	—	—	—	—	
14	FlyQuest	—	—	—	—	—	—	
15	Chinggis Warriors	—	—	—	—	—	—	
16	Lynn Vision	—	—	—	—	—	—	

Updated to match(es) played on November 23, 2026. Source:

=== Results ===
==== Round 1 ====
0–0	November 24	HEROIC	v	Imperial	Singapore
	12:00 SGT	HLTV			

0–0	November 24	9z	v	Lynn Vision	Singapore
	12:00 SGT	HLTV			

0–0	November 24	Ninjas in Pyjamas	v	M80	Singapore
	13:00 SGT	HLTV			

0–0	November 24	100 Thieves	v	Chinggis Warriors	Singapore
	13:00 SGT	HLTV			

0–0	November 24	Liquid	v	GOSH	Singapore
	14:00 SGT	HLTV			

0–0	November 24	PVISION	v	DENDELE	Singapore
	14:00 SGT	HLTV			

0–0	November 24	FaZe	v	Wildcard	Singapore
	15:00 SGT	HLTV			

0–0	November 24	Eternal Fire	v	FlyQuest	Singapore
	15:00 SGT	HLTV			

== Stage 2 ==
Stage 2 will feature sixteen directly invited teams based on their global Valve Regional Standings, competing in a Swiss-system bracket. Teams will be initially seeded according to their Valve Regional Standing, with further matches seeded according to a team's Buchholz score. Teams with equal Buchholz scores will be seeded according to their initial place in Round 1.

Sixteen teams competed for eight Stage 3 spots, with all matches besides elimination and progression matches, which are best-of-three, being best-of-one.

Pos	Team	W	L	RW	RL	RD	BS	Qualification
1	FUT	—	—	—	—	—	—	Qualification to Stage 3
2	The MongolZ	—	—	—	—	—	—	Qualification to Stage 3
3	Nemiga	—	—	—	—	—	—	Qualification to Stage 3
4	Natus Vincere	—	—	—	—	—	—	Qualification to Stage 3
5	G2	—	—	—	—	—	—	Qualification to Stage 3
6	THE ONE	—	—	—	—	—	—	Qualification to Stage 3
7	Astralis	—	—	—	—	—	—	Qualification to Stage 3
8	MIBR	—	—	—	—	—	—	Qualification to Stage 3
9	TBD	—	—	—	—	—	—	
10	TBD	—	—	—	—	—	—	
11	TBD	—	—	—	—	—	—	
12	TBD	—	—	—	—	—	—	
13	TBD	—	—	—	—	—	—	
14	TBD	—	—	—	—	—	—	
15	TBD	—	—	—	—	—	—	
16	TBD	—	—	—	—	—	—	

Updated to match(es) played on November 27, 2026. Source:

== Stage 3 ==
Stage 3 will feature sixteen directly invited teams based on their global Valve Regional Standings, competing in a Swiss-system bracket. Teams will be initially seeded according to their Valve Regional Standing, with further matches seeded according to a team's Buchholz score. Teams with equal Buchholz scores will be seeded according to their initial place in Round 1.

Sixteen teams competed for eight Playoffs Stage spots, with all matches being best-of-three.

Pos	Team	W	L	RW	RL	RD	BS	Qualification
1	MOUZ	—	—	—	—	—	—	Qualification to Playoffs Stage
2	Vitality	—	—	—	—	—	—	Qualification to Playoffs Stage
3	FURIA	—	—	—	—	—	—	Qualification to Playoffs Stage
4	Aurora	—	—	—	—	—	—	Qualification to Playoffs Stage
5	Spirit	—	—	—	—	—	—	Qualification to Playoffs Stage
6	BB Team	—	—	—	—	—	—	Qualification to Playoffs Stage
7	Falcons	—	—	—	—	—	—	Qualification to Playoffs Stage
8	Legacy	—	—	—	—	—	—	Qualification to Playoffs Stage
9	TBD	—	—	—	—	—	—	
10	TBD	—	—	—	—	—	—	
11	TBD	—	—	—	—	—	—	
12	TBD	—	—	—	—	—	—	
13	TBD	—	—	—	—	—	—	
14	TBD	—	—	—	—	—	—	
15	TBD	—	—	—	—	—	—	
16	TBD	—	—	—	—	—	—	

Updated to match(es) played on December 1, 2026. Source:

== Playoffs stage ==
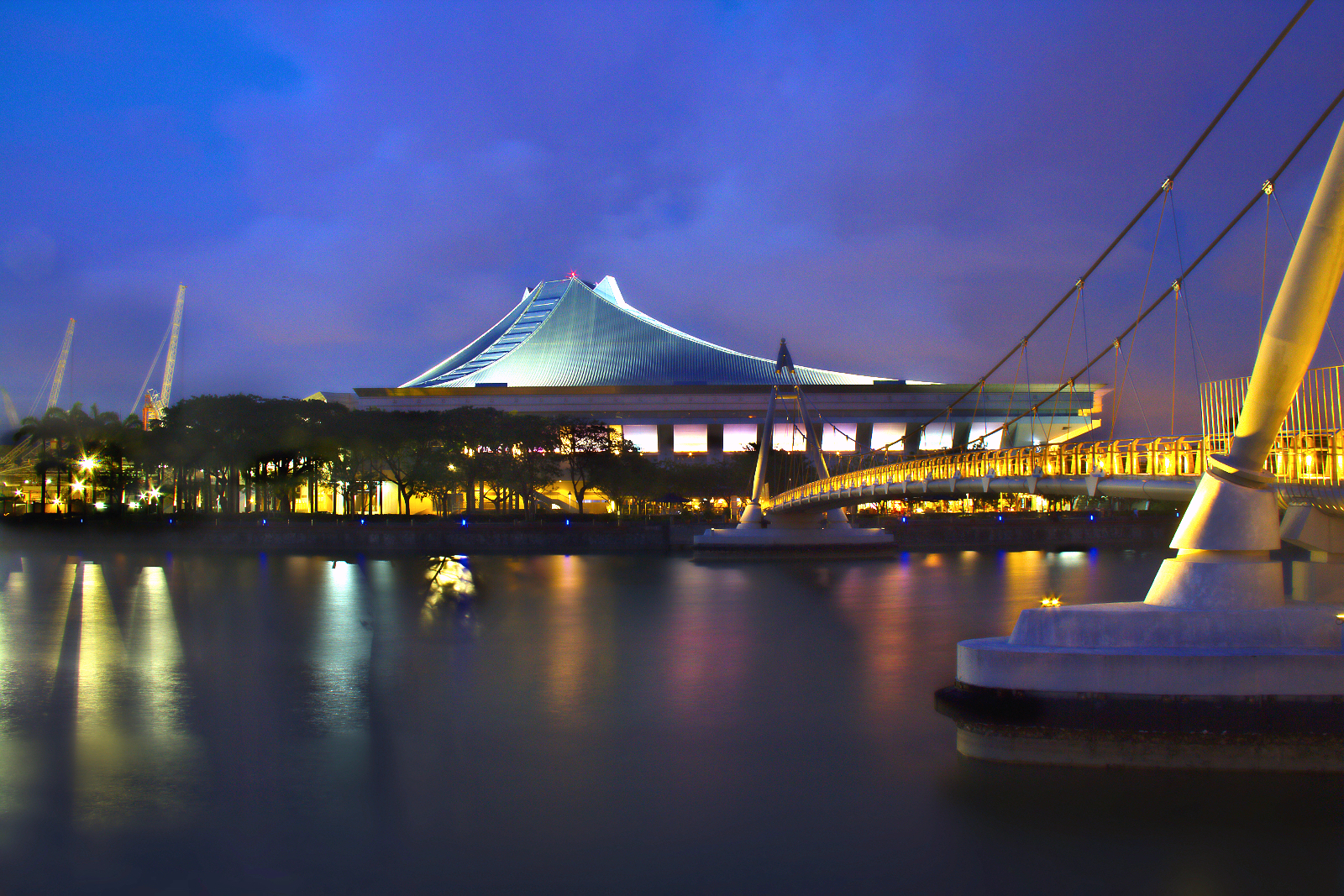
The playoffs will be held in the Singapore Indoor Stadium.

The top eight teams from Stage 3 will advance to a single-elimination bracket. Teams are seeded according to their final Buchholz score earned in Stage 3. Each match in the Playoffs Stage before the grand final is played in a best-of-three format, with the final being a best-of-five. For the first time, the Major will feature a third-place decider played before the grand final.

The Playoffs Stage will be played between December 10 and December 13, 2026, at the Singapore Indoor Stadium.

Quarterfinals
1	TBD
8	TBD
5	TBD
4	TBD
3	TBD
6	TBD
7	TBD
2	TBD

Semifinals

Finals
Third place decider
