= Gobi Cashmere =

Company of Mongolia

GOBI Cashmere
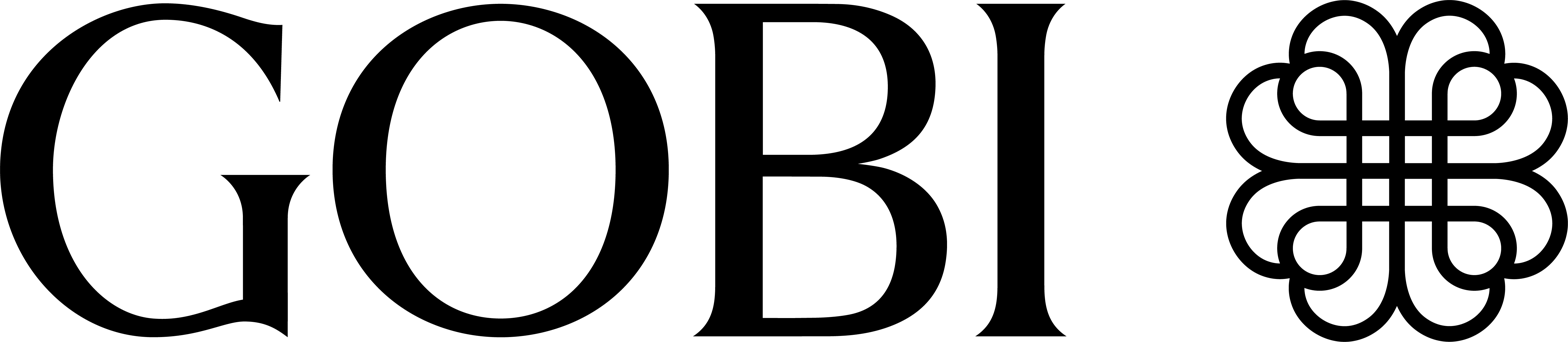
- Native name: Говь ХК
- Type: Public
- Industry: Fashion
- Founded: September 5, 1981; 45 years ago
- Headquarters: Ulaanbaatar, Mongolia
- Area served: Worldwide
- Key people: Amarsaikhan Baatarsaikhan (CEO); Baatarsaikhan Tsagaach (Chairman)
- Products: Cashmere Products
- Brands: GOBI; GOBI Organic; GOBI Kids; Goyo; YAMA
- Number of employees: 1,300 (2025)
- Website: www.gobicashmere.com de.gobicashmere.com us.gobicashmere.com uk.gobicashmere.com

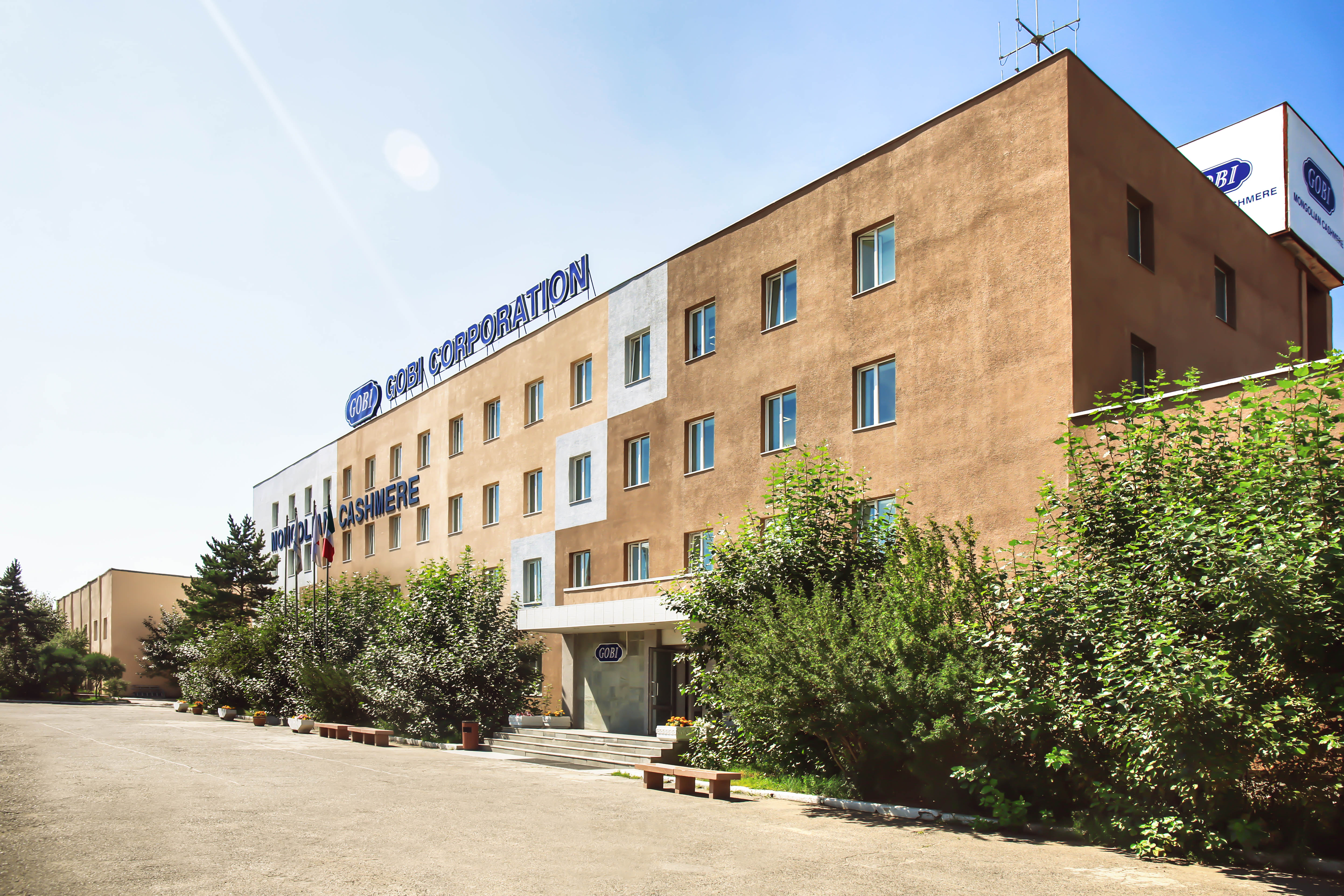
Headquarter of the Gobi Corporation

GOBI Cashmere (Mongolian: “ГОВЬ” ХК) is a Mongolian luxury cashmere manufacturer and joint stock company headquartered in Ulaanbaatar, Mongolia. Founded in 1981, the company is one of the world’s largest vertically integrated producers of cashmere products. The name refers to the Gobi Desert, the primary region where most of the raw cashmere is sourced.

The company was officially established after the installation and adjustment of cashmere and camel wool processing machinery in 1981. In July 2007, FCI LLC acquired the majority of the government’s shares in GOBI, completing its privatization.

GOBI Cashmere operates four branch stores in Mongolia and two stores in Germany, located in Berlin and Düsseldorf, along with eight franchise stores worldwide. The company also maintains dedicated online stores in Germany, the United States, the United Kingdom, France, and Poland.

== History ==
Within the framework of a United Nations Industrial Development Organization (UNIDO) project, an experimental factory for cashmere and camel wool processing was established. As part of the project, 78 engineers received three months of training in Japan to learn cashmere and camel wool processing techniques and the operation of factory machinery.

Cashmere has long been a vital resource for Mongolia’s nomadic herders. One of the country’s primary exports, it is produced from the fine undercoat of goats that thrive across Mongolia’s deserts, plains, mountains, and forests. Other major exports from Mongolia include coal, copper, and gold.

In 2012, the country’s mineral boom led to significant inflation, with consumer prices rising by 12% that year. This inflation increased production costs for GOBI Cashmere, particularly through higher prices for raw materials.

The COVID-19 pandemic further impacted the industry, as reduced international demand for cashmere caused the price of raw materials to drop. Despite lower prices, global demand declined, negatively affecting Mongolia’s economy. As more than one-quarter of the population lives a nomadic lifestyle, and cashmere production accounts for roughly one-third of household income among herders, this downturn posed risks to livelihoods, cultural heritage, and sustainability.

== Timeline ==
- 1976 – A pilot plant for processing goat cashmere and camel wool was established as part of a UNIDO project.
- 1977 – The Government of Japan provided a grant of 5.0 billion yen and signed a bilateral agreement with Mongolia to establish a cashmere and camel wool processing plant in Ulaanbaatar.
- 1981 – The GOBI Factory officially opened under the framework of the Mongolian-Japanese agreement.
- 1987 – Installation of Japan’s SET-092 knitting machine with automatic computer control.
- 1991 – Gradual introduction of ISO-9000 international standards; 98% of products were exported. GOBI became the first Mongolian factory to receive the International Quality Cup and Certificate.
- 1993 – Reorganized into the GOBI joint-stock company under a resolution of the Government of Mongolia.
- 1998 – Expansion into foreign markets with subsidiaries “Altai” in Japan, “Gobi Europe” in Belgium, and “Gobi-USA” in the United States, establishing partnerships in more than 30 countries.
- 2000 – Introduction of wire dyeing technology and installation of the STOLL-330 knitting machine with computer integration.
- 2007 – Privatization was completed when FCI LLC acquired the remaining state shares, making GOBI JSC a fully private company.
- 2008 – Opening of the GOBI Cashmere Factory Store as the flagship store.
- 2010 – Introduction of print technology in the Mongolian cashmere industry.
- 2011 – Production capacity doubled; collaboration with Italian designer Saverio Palatella.
- 2013 – Increased factory capacity and introduction of Wholegarment seamless knitting technology.
- 2014 – Launch of GOBI Organic, featuring cashmere clothing with undyed natural cashmere colors: white, beige, warm grey (Mongolian exclusive), and taupe.
- 2015 – Implementation of the Amoeba management philosophy developed by Japanese entrepreneur Kazuo Inamori.
- 2016 – Opening of the first international store in Berlin, Germany.
- 2017 – Commissioning of a new sewing factory and launch of the company’s e-commerce website: https://www.gobicashmere.com/
- 2019 – Acquisition of Goyo Cashmere from the MCS Group. Ranked 19th in the Mongolian Chamber of Commerce’s Top 100 businesses. Establishment of a U.S. office in Los Angeles and launch of a dedicated American e-commerce platform.
- 2021 – Collaboration in marketing consultancy with Ogilvy agency, part of the WPP group.
- 2022 – Launch of the Cashmere Reborn collection, created from surplus raw materials through innovative technology. Expansion of environmental, social, and governance (ESG) initiatives, obtaining ISO 14001:2015 and ISO 45001:2018 certifications.
- 2023 – Appointment of Italian designer Giorgio Spina as Chief Designer. Certification by OEKO-TEX and the Sustainable Fiber Alliance, with annual renewals.
- 2024 – Implementation of system upgrades, including MES and SAP S/4 HANA ERP. Comprehensive rebranding introducing a new logo, symbol, and visual identity to strengthen global recognition and international presence.

== Description ==
GOBI Cashmere owns the title of “The World’s Largest Cashmere Store”, operating a 2,500 square metre (27,000 sq ft) retail store in the Galleria Ulaanbaatar Mall, located adjacent to the Mongolian Parliament Building in Ulaanbaatar. The interior design of GOBI’s stores incorporates elements of Mongolian heritage and draws inspiration from the country’s landscapes.

The company operates five factories: Primary, Spinning, Weaving, Knitting, and Sewing. The primary factory has the capacity to process approximately 1,200 tons of raw cashmere annually. This raw material is spun into roughly 1,300 tons of cashmere yarn, which is subsequently knitted into 1.7 million pieces, woven into 650,000 items, and sewn into 160,000 garments. Mongolia accounts for around 40 percent of global raw cashmere production, with the remainder largely supplied by China, Iran, and Afghanistan.

Baatarsaikhan Tsagaach was appointed CEO of GOBI in 2008 and played a central role in transforming the former state-owned enterprise into Mongolia’s largest cashmere manufacturer. In March 2024, he was succeeded by Amarsaikhan Baatarsaikhan as chief executive officer.

GOBI Cashmere has collaborated with several internationally recognized designers, including Martin Parker, Joseph Abboud, Tadashi Shoji, Narciso Rodriguez, Donna Karan, and most recently Giorgio Spina. These collaborations have produced collections showcasing Mongolian cashmere on the global stage.

== Rebranding ==
In 2024, GOBI Cashmere undertook a comprehensive rebranding to reinforce its global presence. The initiative introduced a new logo and icon symbolizing the unity of goats, herders, employees, and customers, representing the continuous cycle at the heart of the company. A new color palette was developed, inspired by natural cashmere hues—white, beige, warm grey (exclusive to Mongolia), and deep brown—chosen to highlight authenticity and sustainability. Seasonal symbols for Spring, Summer, Autumn, and Winter were also unveiled to emphasize the brand’s commitment to year-round elegance and comfort.

As part of this transformation, GOBI introduced the concept “Truly Mongolian.”, underscoring that every stage of production—from the sourcing of raw cashmere to the finished garment—takes place in Mongolia. The concept reflects the country’s centuries-old heritage and craftsmanship while reinforcing its identity as a fully Mongolian brand.

Accompanied by a refined mission statement to bring warmth, beauty, and joy through 100% Mongolian cashmere while supporting local communities and the environment, the rebranding reflected both tradition and modern sophistication.

== Gallery ==
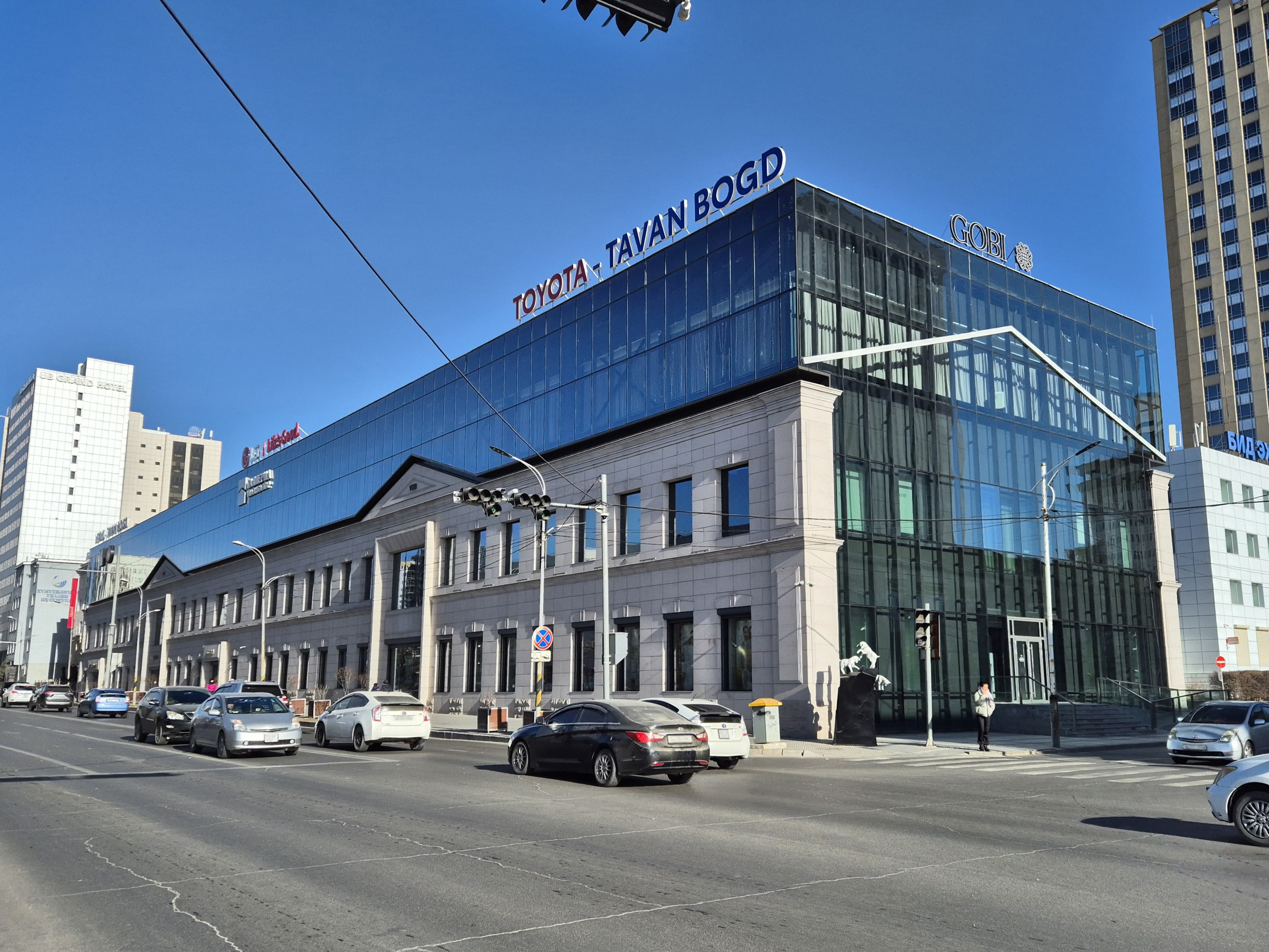
Galleria Ulaanbaatar Mall.

== See also ==
- Cashmere goat
- Cashmere wool
