= Counter-Strike Major Championships =

Valve-sponsored tournaments in Counter-Strike

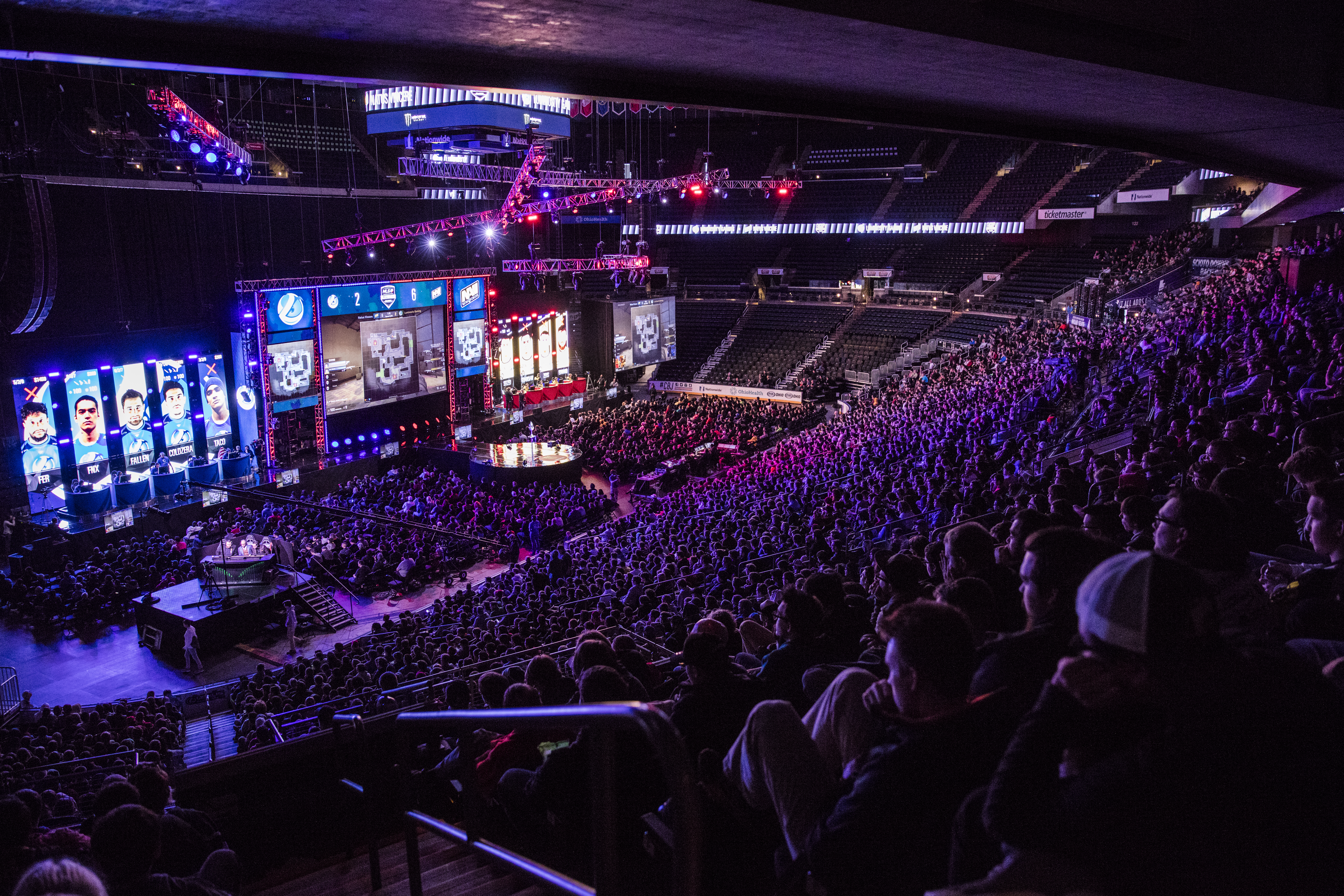
- The MLG Major: Columbus 2016 finals
- Game: Counter-Strike: Global Offensive; Counter-Strike 2
- Founded: 2013
- No. of teams: 16 teams (2013–2017); 24 teams (2018–2024); 32 teams (2025–present)
- Country: International
- Venue: Various
- Most recent champion: Team Falcons (1st title)
- Most titles: Astralis (4 titles)
- Broadcasters: Twitch, Steam.tv, YouTube, Kick
- Sponsor: Valve

Counter-Strike Major Championships, commonly known as the Majors, are Counter-Strike (CS) esports tournaments sponsored by Valve, the game's developer. The first Valve-recognized Major took place in 2013 in Jönköping, Sweden and was hosted by DreamHack with a total prize pool of US$250,000 split among 16 teams. This, along with the following 19 Majors, was played in Counter-Strike: Global Offensive. As of the 2023 release of Counter-Strike 2 (CS2), Counter-Strike esports, including the Majors, are played in CS2.

Since then, the Major circuit has expanded significantly, with recent tournaments advertising a US$1,250,000 prize pool and featuring thirty-two teams from around the world. The Majors are considered to be the most important and prestigious tournaments in the Counter-Strike scene.

The current champions are Team Falcons, who won their first Major at the IEM Cologne Major 2026, the fifth to be held in Counter-Strike 2. Astralis hold the record for the most Major titles with four.

== History ==
Counter-Strike: Global Offensive is a multiplayer first-person shooter video game developed by Hidden Path Entertainment and Valve. It is the fourth game in the Counter-Strike series. The first game in the series, Counter-Strike 1.6, was officially released in 2000 and competitive play began soon after. The first significant international tournament was the 2001 Cyberathlete Professional League (CPL) Winter Championship, considered the first "Major". The CPL Summer and Winter Championships, along with the World Cyber Games, Electronic Sports World Cup and Intel Extreme Masters World Championships, were considered Majors by the community, although Valve did not sponsor or give any official designation to the tournaments.

Swedish teams, most notably SK Gaming, dominated early Majors but the Polish roster known as the Golden Five were the most successful lineup. Many teams from other parts of the world would win Majors, including Team 3D from the United States at CPL Winter 2002 and WCG 2004, NoA from Norway at CPL Winter 2004, mibr from Brazil at ESWC 2006, and WeMade FOX from South Korea at WEM 2010.

On September 16, 2013, a year after the release of Global Offensive, Valve announced a US$250,000 community-funded prize pool for the first official CS:GO Major. The money was partially community-funded through the game's Arms Deal update, which allowed players to buy in-game skins. Valve announced the tournament would take place in Sweden and would be hosted by DreamHack. The tournament took place in late November and was won by the Swedish team Fnatic who upset Ninjas in Pyjamas in the finals. After Dreamhack 2013, Valve announced they would partner with tournament organizers to host three Majors per year. These Majors are the most prestigious events in the competitive CS:GO scene, and the professional players' legacies are often judged by their performances at these tournaments.

The early Majors were dominated by Swedish teams, as Fnatic and NiP combined to win the four of the first six Majors. NiP would play in five of the first six grand finals. When Fnatic won Cologne 2015, they became the first team to win back to back Majors, and the first to win a third Major in total. This feat has only been matched by Astralis and Team Vitality, although Vitality did not maintain the same roster core throughout their Major wins.

At the end of 2015, Valve announced that MLG would host the first Major in North America. On February 23, 2016, with MLG Columbus 2016 coming up, Valve announced a permanent increase in the prize pool from US$250,000 to US$1,000,000. However, Valve reduced the number of Majors per year from three to two. Luminosity Gaming, a Brazilian team, won the event to becomes the first non-European team to win a Major. This roster would also go on to win back to back Majors, with their second as SK Gaming at ESL One Cologne 2016.

Gambit Esports, made up primarily of players from Kazakhstan, won PGL Major Kraków 2017 to become the first Asian and CIS team to win a Major.

On December 13, 2017, the general manager of ELEAGUE, the hosts of the ELEAGUE Major: Boston 2018, announced a revised format designed by Valve and ELEAGUE that would expand the number of teams in the Major from sixteen to twenty-four. This was also the first Major to take place in multiple cities, as the group stages took place in Atlanta at the Turner Studios. Cloud9, an American team, won the event to become the first North American team to win a Major.

After Boston 2018, the Danish team Astralis became the top team in CS:GO and one of the best teams in Counter-Strike history. With wins at London 2018, Katowice 2019, and Berlin 2019, Astralis become the first team to win three Majors in a row and four majors total. After Berlin 2019, Valve and ESL announced the following Major, ESL One Rio 2020, which was to be the first Major to be hosted in South America. Rio 2020, originally scheduled for May, was then postponed to November due to the COVID-19 pandemic. The November Major was announced with a US$2,000,000 prize pool, combining the amounts that would have been set aside for both Majors. In September 2020, the Rio Major was officially canceled due to COVID-19. In December 2020, Valve moved the 2021 Major from May to October and November, citing concerns over the pandemic.

On January 14, 2021, Valve announced that the championship would be held between October 23 and November 7 in Stockholm. Over two years after the last Major, PGL Major Stockholm 2021 took place, with favourites Natus Vincere dominating the tournament and becoming the first team in CS:GO history to win a Major without dropping a single map throughout the tournament. PGL Major Stockholm 2021 surpassed the long-standing Counter-Strike viewership record 4 times; reaching 2.75 million concurrent viewers in the final.

FaZe Clan won the PGL Major Antwerp 2022, defeating Natus Vincere 2-0, and becoming the first international team in CS:GO history to win a Major.

The previously cancelled ESL One Rio 2020 Major was replaced with IEM Rio Major 2022 and was held in Rio de Janeiro, Brazil on October 31 - November 13, 2022. Outsiders, a neutral name for esports organization Virtus.pro due to ties with the Russian government in light of the 2022 Russian invasion of Ukraine, won the tournament defeating Heroic in the grand final 2-0.

BLAST Paris Major 2023 was held in Paris on May 8 - May 21, 2023 with a prize pool of $1,250,000 USD. Shortly after the announcement of Counter-Strike 2, the official CS:GO Twitter account announced that the BLAST Paris Major would be the last CS:GO Major with the next major happening in March 2024 in CS2. Team Vitality, a French organization with native star player Mathieu 'ZywOo' Herbaut, defeated dark horse GamerLegion by 2–0 to clinch the final CS:GO Major title.

The first Counter-Strike 2 Major was announced to be the PGL CS2 Major Copenhagen 2024 which was held from March 17–31 in the Royal Arena. On November 12, 2023, Perfect World, who are responsible for distributing Counter-Strike 2 in China, announced the second major following the release of Counter-Strike 2, taking place in Shanghai between December 1-15, 2024. Team Spirit defeated FaZe Clan 2-1, with star player donk becoming the youngest player to win a Major and Major MVP at 17 years 324 days old.

On January 3, 2025, Valve announced a second expansion of the number of teams to thirty-two, starting with the BLAST Austin Major that year. Team Vitality would win their second Major trophy after defeating The MongolZ 2-1, and their third after defeating FaZe Clan 3-1 at the Budapest Major, in the first Major grand final to be held as a best-of-five.

== Format ==
=== Qualification ===
Starting after Dreamhack 2013, the top eight teams from each Major (those who made it to the playoff stage) earned automatic berths to the next Major. These teams are called "Legends". The other eight teams, called "Challengers", were decided by regional qualifiers, mainly from Europe and North America. A small number of teams have been directly invited or earned attendance from a last chance qualifier to fill final open spots when necessary. Beginning with the DreamHack Open Cluj-Napoca 2015 qualification cycle, Valve created a single 16-team main qualifier before the Major. The bottom eight teams from the previous Major earn automatic berths to the newly formed Major qualifier, and the regional qualifiers now send teams to the main qualifier, instead of directly to the Major.

For MLG Columbus 2016 the regional qualifiers, leading into the Major qualifier, were replaced by "Minors". The Columbus Minor system involved four regional qualifiers and two "last chance" qualifiers, and results in invites going to one team from the Americas, two Asian teams, one CIS team, one European team, and three last chance qualifier spots. The system was simplified in the following Major, ESL One Cologne 2016, with the removal of the last chance qualifiers. Four Minors—Asia, CIS, Europe, Americas—were used. Two teams from each qualifier would go to the Major qualifier, joining the bottom eight teams from the previous Major. The top eight teams from the 16-team Major qualifier advance to the Major.

At ELEAGUE Major: Boston 2018, the Major qualifier was integrated into the full Major as the first of three phases, expanding the number of teams in each Major to 24. The Major qualifier was renamed the "Challengers Stage", the former group stage was renamed the "Legends Stage", and the playoff stage was named the "Champions Stage". This increased the number of teams getting automatic invites to Majors to 16, while retaining the Minor system to fill the remaining eight spots in phase one of the Major. The Legends—still made up of the teams who reach the playoff stage—earned an automatic invitation to the Legends Stage of the following Major, while the teams placing 9-16 earned automatic invitations to the Challengers Stage of the following Major. On August 28, 2018, shortly before the start of the FACEIT Major: London 2018, Valve announced that they were reducing the number of automatic Major invites to fourteen, starting with the London 2018 Major; the two teams that go winless in the first phase must go through the Minors to get back to the next Major.

From the PGL Major Stockholm 2021 up until the Perfect World Shanghai Major 2024, no automatic berths were given to any team regardless of their record in the previous Major. Instead, a Regional Major Ranking (RMR) system was used, which at first was a yearly points circuit where each region would have three qualifying tournaments where teams can receive points towards qualifying for the Major, which included Contenders, Challengers and Legends distinctions (as well as the Legends) for the top teams within each region. Despite initially being used for the ESL One Rio Major 2020, the event's cancellation would mean that PGL Major Stockholm 2021 was the first Major that utilized the RMR system.

The very next Major, PGL Major Antwerp 2022, would scrap the points circuit in favor of qualifying tournaments that bore the RMR name, initially and ultimately 2 for Europe (which included the CIS region), 1 for the Americas and 1 for Asia-Pacific. Teams qualified for their regional RMRs via making the Legends Stage of the previous major or via online qualifying made up of Open Qualifiers, where any team could sign up and compete for RMR spots. Closed Qualifiers were added between the RMRs and the Open Qualifiers in time for Paris 2023, while Open Qualifiers were removed in most regions for Shanghai 2024 in favor of extensively utilizing the Valve Regional Standings (VRS), a ranking system utilized by Valve to determine the best teams in each region and globally. In addition, regions could gain or lose Challengers and Legends spots in the Major based on the region's results from the previous Major, with 3 Challengers spots reserved for Europe and the Americas and 2 for Asia-Pacific. For example, after PGL Major Copenhagen 2024, the Americas region would go from 1 Legends spot and 4 Challengers spot, to 7 Challengers spots for Shanghai, after 4 teams from the Americas qualified for the Elimination Stage, with none making the Playoff stage.

For BLAST Austin Major 2025, an extra stage was added to the Major, expanding the number of teams to 32 and stages to four. Of these, 16 are directly invited from the VRS to the second and third stages. The other sixteen teams qualified for the Major's first stage via Major Regional Qualifiers, or MRQs, with the next-best teams in each VRS being invited; this system would be scrapped for StarLadder Budapest 2025 as the Stage 1 spots would also be allocated via VRS. Like with the RMR system, regions can gain and lose invites to the later stages of the Major based on the prior Major's results, but 6 teams each from the Americas and Europe, as well as 4 teams from Asia-Pacific, qualify for the Major in Stage 1.

Unlike traditional sports or other esports leagues, Valve considers the players in each team to have the Major spots, rather than the organization itself. For instance, at the ELEAGUE Major 2017, Team EnVyUs placed ninth, meaning it would have an automatic berth at the next Major qualifier. However, before the next Major, three of EnVyUs's players transferred to G2 Esports, meaning Team EnVyUs lost its spot at the Major qualifier.

=== Tournament format ===
Although the playoff stage of the Majors has generally followed a standard 8-team single-elimination format, the group stages have changed multiple times. From 2013 to 2016, Majors used a four group GSL-style format for the group stage. In each four-team group, the two higher seeds would initially face the two lower seeds. The two winners from the first round of matches would then play to determine which team gets the top seed. The two losers would also play to eliminate one team. After this second round of matches, the remaining two teams play to determine which team takes the final playoff spot. All group stage games at the first Majors were best-of-ones. The last Major of 2015 and both Majors in 2016 featured a best-of-three decider in the final match of each group.

The group stage of ESL One Cologne 2015 worked differently. Initially, the first three matches of the group stage started out the same way as the standard GSL format, determining the group winner. However, teams were then reassigned afterwards so that the two losers played from different groups and then the decider match would also be teams from different groups.

Beginning in 2017, the group stage has featured a Swiss-system group stage. Before the tournament, teams are divided into four pots, with pot one having the four highest seeds, pot two having the next four highest seeds, and so on. A randomly selected team from pot one would face off against a randomly selected team from pot four. The same process is done with the pots two and three. After the initial seeded match, teams play five rounds against randomly drawn teams with the same record. No two teams play twice unless necessary. If a team wins three matches, then that team moves on to the next stage. If a team loses three matches, that team is eliminated. All games were best-of-one until the London 2018 Major. The Boston 2018 Major featured two Swiss group stages; the stage formerly known as the offline Major qualifier was now called the New Challengers stage and the group stage was now rebranded as the New Legends stage. The London 2018 Major used a slightly different form of the Swiss system, called the Buchholz system, in which matchups were seeded instead of random and the last round featured best-of-three sets. The next Major, Katowice 2019, featured a crowdsourced Elo system, in which participating teams ranked the 15 other teams before the Legends Stage to create a seeding system for each round of the Swiss system. The Copenhagen 2024 Major changed the names of the two Swiss stages, with the Challengers Stage becoming the Opening Stage and the Legends Stage becoming the Elimination Stage, while the first round match-up seeding for the Swiss stages was tweaked. A third Swiss stage was added beginning with the 2025 Austin Major to accompany the expansion to 32 teams.

The Playoffs, known as the New Champions stage and Champions stage beforehand, have featured eight teams at all Majors. All matches are best-of-three, single-elimination series. When the GSL format was used for group stages, group winners earned top seeds and group runner-ups earned bottom seeds. Each top seed played a bottom seed in quarterfinals. With current Swiss format seeding, the two teams that finish undefeated in the group stage earn the highest seeds. Two of the three lowest seeds from the group stage (teams that advance with two losses) are randomly selected to play against the high seeds. Two of the three middle seeds (teams that advance with one loss) are randomly selected to play each other, and the remaining two teams face each other to finalize the bracket.

Valve would make further changes to the Major format at StarLadder Budapest Major 2025, introducing a best-of-five grand final. At the following Major, IEM Cologne Major 2026, the third Swiss-stage group features only best-of-three matches. Another change was made to the tournament after it was announced on April 9, 2026, that third-place decider matches would be held before the grand finals, starting with PGL Major Singapore 2026.

=== Banned players ===
Valve has banned players from attending the Majors for violations of competitive integrity. A Valve Anti-Cheat (VAC) ban is the most common way players get banned. VAC is an anti-cheat program designed by Valve to detect cheats running in various games, including Counter-Strike. If cheats are detected, the account is given a permanent lifetime ban from playing on VAC-secured servers. Other server providers, such as FACEIT and ESEA, have their own anti-cheat systems and work with Valve to detect new cheats. One of the most high-profile VAC bans was given to Hovik "KQLY" Tovmassian. KQLY, along with several other professional players, was banned while playing for France's best team, Titan.

Valve has also banned players from Valve-sponsored events for match fixing. The first Valve ban for match fixing was a response to the iBUYPOWER match fixing scandal, in which esports journalist Richard Lewis revealed that one of North America's best teams, iBUYPOWER, had thrown a match for high-value skins. Valve indefinitely banned seven players who were involved in the scandal from attending any Majors. Tyler "Skadoodle" Latham was the only iBUYPOWER player not to be banned, as he did not receive any payment after the game. Valve would later make the bans permanent, causing some controversy in the Counter-Strike community. Although tournament organizers ESL and DreamHack lifted their own bans on the former iBUYPOWER players in 2017, the Major ban effectively ended the high level careers of two of North America's best in-game leaders (Sam "DaZeD" Marine and Joshua "steel" Nissan) and Braxton "swag" Pierce. Skadoodle would go on to win a Major with Cloud9. Following the iBUYPOWER ban, there have been two other match fixing bans, resulting in nine other players being barred from the Majors.

== List of Major Championships ==
Edition	Organizer	Date	Winner	Result	Runner-up	Ref.
In Global Offensive
Jönköping 2013	Dreamhack	November 28–30, 2013	Fnatic	2–1	Ninjas in Pyjamas	
Katowice 2014	ESL	March 13–16, 2014	Virtus.pro	2–0	Ninjas in Pyjamas	
Cologne 2014	ESL	August 14–17, 2014	Ninjas in Pyjamas	2–1	Fnatic	
Jönköping 2014	Dreamhack	November 27–29, 2014	Team LDLC.com	2–1	Ninjas in Pyjamas	
Katowice 2015	ESL	March 12–15, 2015	Fnatic	2–1	Ninjas in Pyjamas	
Cologne 2015	ESL	August 20–23, 2015	Fnatic	2–0	Team EnVyUs	
Cluj-Napoca 2015	DreamHack	October 28–November 1, 2015	Team EnVyUs	2–0	Natus Vincere	
Columbus 2016	MLG	March 29–April 3, 2016	Luminosity Gaming	2–0	Natus Vincere	
Cologne 2016	ESL	July 5–10, 2016	SK Gaming	2–0	Team Liquid	
Atlanta 2017	ELEAGUE	January 22–29, 2017	Astralis	2–1	Virtus.pro	
Kraków 2017	PGL	July 16–23, 2017	Gambit Esports	2–1	Immortals	
Boston 2018 (Note: The group stage was held in Atlanta from January 12 to January 22, 2018, and the playoff stage took place at the Agganis Arena in Boston from January 26 to January 28, 2018.)	ELEAGUE	January 12–28, 2018	Cloud9	2–1	FaZe Clan	
London 2018	FACEIT	September 5–23, 2018	Astralis	2–0	Natus Vincere	
Katowice 2019	ESL	February 13–March 3, 2019	Astralis	2–0	ENCE	
Berlin 2019	StarLadder	August 23–September 8, 2019	Astralis	2–0	AVANGAR	
Stockholm 2021	PGL	October 26–November 7, 2021	Natus Vincere	2–0	G2 Esports	
Antwerp 2022	PGL	May 9–22, 2022	FaZe Clan	2–0	Natus Vincere	
Rio 2022	ESL	October 31–November 13, 2022 (Note: Rio de Janeiro was initially supposed to host CS:GO's sixteenth major in 2020. It was supposed to be held between May 11–24, 2020, before being delayed to November 9–22, 2020, due to the COVID-19 pandemic. In September 2020, ESL cancelled ESL One Rio. In May 2022, ESL announced that it would host the eighteenth major in Rio de Janeiro.)	Outsiders (Note: Due to sanctions against Russia in response to the Russian invasion of Ukraine, Virtus.pro competed under a neutral name.)	2–0	Heroic	
Paris 2023	BLAST	May 8–21, 2023	Team Vitality	2–0	GamerLegion	
In Counter-Strike 2
Copenhagen 2024	PGL	March 17–31, 2024	Natus Vincere	2–1	FaZe Clan	
Shanghai 2024	Perfect World	November 30–December 15, 2024	Team Spirit	2–1	FaZe Clan	
Austin 2025	BLAST	June 3–22, 2025	Team Vitality	2–1	The MongolZ	
Budapest 2025	StarLadder	November 24–December 14, 2025	Team Vitality	3–1	FaZe Clan	
Cologne 2026	ESL	June 2–21, 2026	Team Falcons	3–0	FURIA Esports	
Singapore 2026	PGL	November 25–December 13, 2026	–	–	–	
Buenos Aires 2027	FiReSPORTS	May 31–June 20, 2027	–	–	–	
Shanghai 2027	Perfect World	November 22–December 12, 2027	–	–	–	

=== Map pool ===
Starting with Cologne 2014, maps were grouped into Active Duty and Reserves, with the former category being used for all Majors.

Active Duty map pool by Major
Map	Date added	Jönköping 2013	Katowice 2014	Cologne 2014	Jönköping 2014	Katowice 2015	Cologne 2015	Cluj-Napoca 2015	Columbus 2016	Cologne 2016	Atlanta 2017	Kraków 2017	Boston 2018	London 2018	Katowice 2019	Berlin 2019	Stockholm 2021	Antwerp 2022	Rio 2022	Paris 2023	Copenhagen 2024	Shanghai 2024	Austin 2025	Budapest 2025	Cologne 2026	Singapore 2026
Dust II	August 21, 2012 (Note: Remake introduced to Active Duty on April 20, 2018.)	Yes	Yes	Yes	Yes	Yes	Yes	Yes	Yes	Yes	Yes	No	No	Yes	Yes	Yes	Yes	Yes	Yes	No	No	Yes	Yes	Yes	Yes	Yes
Train	August 21, 2012 (Note: Remake introduced to Active Duty on March 31, 2015. Reintroduced to Active Duty in Counter-Strike 2 on January 6, 2025.)	Yes	Yes	No	No	No	Yes	Yes	Yes	Yes	Yes	Yes	Yes	Yes	Yes	Yes	No	No	No	No	No	No	Yes	Yes	No	No
Inferno	August 21, 2012 (Note: Remake introduced to Active Duty on February 3, 2017.)	Yes	Yes	Yes	Yes	Yes	Yes	Yes	Yes	No	No	Yes	Yes	Yes	Yes	Yes	Yes	Yes	Yes	Yes	Yes	Yes	Yes	Yes	Yes	Yes
Nuke	August 21, 2012 (Note: Remake introduced to Active Duty on April 22, 2016.)	Yes	Yes	Yes	Yes	Yes	No	No	No	Yes	Yes	Yes	Yes	Yes	Yes	Yes	Yes	Yes	Yes	Yes	Yes	Yes	Yes	Yes	Yes	Yes
Mirage	June 6, 2013	Yes	Yes	Yes	Yes	Yes	Yes	Yes	Yes	Yes	Yes	Yes	Yes	Yes	Yes	Yes	Yes	Yes	Yes	Yes	Yes	Yes	Yes	Yes	Yes	Yes
Cache	July 1, 2014	—N/a		Yes	Yes	Yes	Yes	Yes	Yes	Yes	Yes	Yes	Yes	Yes	Yes	No	No	No	No	No	No	No	No	No	No	Yes
Cobblestone	July 1, 2014	—N/a		Yes	Yes	Yes	Yes	Yes	Yes	Yes	Yes	Yes	Yes	No	No	No	No	No	No	No	No	No	No	No	No	No
Overpass	July 1, 2014	—N/a		Yes	Yes	Yes	Yes	Yes	Yes	Yes	Yes	Yes	Yes	Yes	Yes	Yes	Yes	Yes	Yes	Yes	Yes	No	No	Yes	Yes	No
Vertigo	March 19, 2019	—N/a														Yes	Yes	Yes	Yes	Yes	Yes	Yes	No	No	No	No
Ancient	May 3, 2021	—N/a															Yes	Yes	Yes	Yes	Yes	Yes	Yes	Yes	Yes	Yes
Anubis	November 18, 2022	—N/a																		Yes	Yes	Yes	Yes	No	Yes	Yes

=== Titles by organization ===
* Team or organization no longer participates in Counter-Strike esports.

Team	Champions	Runners-up	Total
Astralis	4	0	4
Fnatic	3	1	4
Team Vitality	3	0	3
Natus Vincere	2	4	6
Virtus.pro/Outsiders	2	1	3
Ninjas in Pyjamas	1	4	5
FaZe Clan	1	4	5
ENVY	1	1	2
Team LDLC	1	0	1
Luminosity Gaming	1	0	1
SK Gaming	1	0	1
Gambit Esports	1	0	1
Cloud9	1	0	1
Team Spirit	1	0	1
Team Falcons	1	0	1

== Features ==
=== Stickers ===
Stickers are virtual items in the game which players can buy directly using purchasable tokens or indirectly via the Steam marketplace. The stickers can then be applied to in-game gun skins. Valve has released a sticker design for each team attending a Major since Katowice 2014, and a sticker for each professional player's signature since Cologne 2015. These two types of stickers come in a variety of styles: paper, glitter, holographic, foil, and gold. With each sticker purchase, half of the proceeds go to the player or team and half go to Valve. Historically, these stickers have been obtainable in game from sticker capsules, with team and player signature stickers separated into Contenders, Challengers and Legends capsules based on team status, but this was changed to the token system starting from the 2026 Cologne Major.

These sticker capsules are unique for each tournament and can only be purchased at the time of the tournament. Because of this forced rarity, stickers from early majors tend to become more expensive over time. After initially costing less than US$10, a "Titan" holographic sticker from Katowice 2014 sold on secondary markets for US$80,000 in 2023, making it the most expensive public sticker trade in the game's history.

=== Souvenir packages ===
Souvenir packages are virtual packages containing a gun skin that are exclusive to CS:GO Majors. These "souvenir skins" can rank among the most expensive skins in the game because of their rarity. After Cloud9 became the first ever North American CS:GO Major champion at Boston 2018, a souvenir skin with the signature of the finals MVP, Tyler "Skadoodle" Latham, sold for US$61,000.

=== In-game tributes ===
After certain significant or iconic moments in Global Offensive Majors, Valve has added in-game memorials to the location of the event, usually in the form of graffiti or signs. Thus far, there have been six moments in Majors that have been memorialized by Valve, however, all graffitis were removed once the game upgraded to Counter-Strike 2 (CS2).
