= Gambling Regulatory Authority of Singapore =

Statutory board of the Government of Singapore

Agency overview
- Formed: 1 August 2022; 4 years ago
- Jurisdiction: Government of Singapore
- Headquarters: 2 Crawford Street, #08-01, ICA Services Centre, Singapore 207218
- Minister responsible: K Shanmugam, Minister for Home Affairs
- Agency executives: Hoong Wee Teck, Chairman; Daniel Tan, Chief Executive
- Parent agency: Ministry of Home Affairs
- Website: https://www.gra.gov.sg

The Gambling Regulatory Authority of Singapore (GRA) is a statutory board under the Ministry of Home Affairs of the Government of Singapore. Formed on 1 August 2022 by amalgamating the previous Casino Regulatory Authority of Singapore and MHA’s Gambling Regulatory Unit, it regulates the management and operation of all gambling activities in Singapore.

== History ==
Plans were announced on 3 April 2020 to form the Gambling Regulatory Authority of Singapore by 2021. The agency will control all gambling activities in Singapore, instead of having many agencies like the Casino Regulatory Authority of Singapore (CRA) (which regulated casinos previously) and the Ministry of Home Affairs's (MHA) Gambling Regulatory Unit. Meanwhile, the Singapore Police Force and Ministry of Social and Family Development deal with enforcement against illegal gambling activities and gambling issues respectively.

Subsequently, MHA consulted in 2021 on new legislation aimed at forming the GRA and consolidating other gambling-related laws, which were previously scattered across different Acts with varying penalties. This was necessary because the laws were enacted at different periods of Singapore's history. The reorganisation was intended to enable better enforcement, standardise penalties and streamline gambling legislation. One particular change was the deregulation of social gambling provided that it does not pose risks to public order. Another was the adoption of a technology-neutral definition of "gambling" so that laws could cover new and emerging forms of gambling, including applications where the boundaries between gaming and gambling may be blurred.

These changes were introduced to Parliament on 14 February 2022 and passed on 11 March 2022 as the Gambling Control Act and the Gambling Regulatory Authority of Singapore Act.

The GRA was thus reconstituted from the CRA on 1 August 2022, several months after reforms to gambling laws.

== Functions ==
The GRA regulates all forms of gambling, ranging from casinos to fruit machines, betting services and outlets, and online gambling. It also licenses lower-risk gambling activities through a class licensing framework, allowing eligible operators to conduct such activities without requiring individual licences.

== See also ==
- Gambling in Singapore
- Marina Bay Sands
- Resorts World Sentosa
