= Gambling in Singapore =

Gambling in Singapore is controlled by several statutes, being the Casino Control Act, Gambling Control Act and Gambling Regulatory Authority of Singapore Act. The Gambling Regulatory Authority of Singapore (GRA) was formed on 1 August 2022, by reconstituting the Casino Regulatory Authority of Singapore (CRA), to regulate gambling in Singapore. It is a statutory board under the Ministry of Home Affairs.

Singapore Pools is the only operator that is legally allowed to run lotteries in the country. Casinos are allowed in Singapore in the form of integrated resorts (IR), such as Marina Bay Sands and Resorts World Sentosa, where the casino is integrated in a major resort property that includes a hotel, together with convention facilities, entertainment shows, theme parks, luxury retail and fine dining. Societies are allowed to operate slot machines in designated rooms under the Gambling Control Act.

== History ==
In 1819, after the Treaty of Singapore was signed on 6 February and modern Singapore was born, Sir Stamford Raffles declared a policy that all forms are gambling are prohibited. However, the first Resident of Singapore, William Farquhar, established a gambling farm which frustrated Raffles, one of the many reasons leading to Raffles' removal of Farquhar as resident of Singapore. In 1823, after removing Farquhar, Raffles published a Regulation which banned gaming houses and cockfighting pits. Gamblers and owners of gaming houses and cockfighting pits would be punished with 80 blows with a cudgel, gaming stakes confiscated, gaming house confiscated and to wear a heavy wooden collar for a month. However, Farquhar's replacement, John Crawfurd, wrote to the Supreme Government advocating licensing gambling in Singapore and that the Chinese community had appealed to him to suspend Raffle's regulation.

Licensed gambling continued to flourish under Crawfurd's governance with gambling profits doubled from 15,000 to 30,000 pounds from 1823 to 1826. In 1827, the Grand Jury made a presentation against gaming farms, Crawfurd referred them as "idiots". Gambling farms were frequently debated in the following years such that in the 1860s, the Secretary of State for the Colonies, Henry Pelham-Clinton, 5th Duke of Newcastle, launched an inquiry over the gambling farms.

In 1842, the Singapore Sporting Club was founded by Scottish merchant William Henry Macleod Read to operate the Serangoon Road Race Course at Farrer Park Field. It also accepted bets on horse racing and ran 4-Digits (4D) draws.

In 1968, Singapore Pools was incorporated to curb illegal gambling in Singapore. It provided Singaporeans with a legal avenue to bet on lotteries, countering the rampant illegal betting syndicates that were present.

On 18 April 2005, during a parliament session, Prime Minister of Singapore Lee Hsien Loong announced the cabinet's decision to develop two casinos and associated hotels and malls in Marina South and Sentosa. Prior to the development of the integrated resorts, locals would primarily gamble on cruise ships that sailed in the international waters just beyond Singapore's control or travel to Genting Highlands, Malaysia to gamble. These cruising casinos remained a draw to those who were deterred by the entry fee for the casinos in Singapore.

The government stated that the aim of the project was to boost Singapore's tourism industry which had been facing intense competition from other destinations around the region, particularly from nearby Bangkok and Hong Kong, which has since also considered legalization of casinos in the wake of initiatives in Singapore. Even closer to home, Malaysia has long had a legal casino accompanied theme park on Genting Highlands, which proved popular with Singaporean tourists. The IRs in Singapore were expected to create about 35,000 jobs directly and indirectly. In addition to the casinos, the IRs will have other amenities including hotels, restaurants, shopping and convention centers, theatres, museums and theme parks. The industry was expected to invest US$7.1 billion in integrated resorts (US$3.5 billion in Marina Bay; US$3.6 billion in Resorts World).

In 2008, the CRA was formed to regulate gambling in management and operation of the casinos in Singapore. It was reconstituted to form the GRA in 2022.

On 20 July 2017, the Ministry of Home Affairs announced that regulations on slot machines would be tightened over the next two years and included changes that added more stringent criteria to meet for permits, requirements aimed at reducing availability and accessibility, and setting in place social safeguards to mitigate potential problem gambling.

In 2018, the newly formed Singapore Premier League (SPL), known previously as S.League, disallowed non-SPL clubs to have slot machines while SPL clubs to have a maximum of 15 machines, by the end of 2019. On 15 September 2022, SPL clubs were informed to stop all jackpot operations by the end of October.

== Public debate and criticisms ==
The plan to build the integrated resorts was subject to considerable debate among Singaporeans even until 2014. Several groups, especially those belonging to religious communities as well as social workers, openly expressed their disapproval of the casinos. Concerns were raised about the negative social impact of casino gambling, citing worries that the casinos could encourage more gambling and increase the risk of compulsive gambling. Activist groups argued that a casino could also lead to undesirable activities often associated with gambling, including money laundering, loan sharks or even organized crime.

Lee acknowledged the downsides of having integrated resorts and the concerns expressed by the public. He promised that there would be safeguards to limit the social impact of casino gambling. He stated there would be restrictions on the admission of local people into the casinos. Lee announced a steep entrance fee of S$100 per entry or S$2,000 per year (increased to $150 per entry or $3,000 per year on 4 April 2019) and a system of exclusions for all Singaporeans. In addition, the casinos would not be allowed to extend credit to the local population who are not premium players. Premium players are players who opened a deposit account with the casino and has a credit balance of at least SGD $100,000.

The six-month consultative period gave the opportunity for many sections of the population to voice their opposition to the casinos, including a petition hat attracted tens of thousands of signatures. When Lee approved the proposal after such widespread criticism, the opposition said that he had overruled consensus.

The issue of casinos in Singapore was brought up by parliamentary members such as Denise Phua suggesting that the place of gambling in Singapore be reviewed during a parliament session discussing Remote Gambling Bill.

== Social issues ==
To address social issues arising from the casinos, such as problem gambling, the National Council on Problem Gambling (NCPG) was created in 2005.

In 2017, controversies surrounding association football club operations, which had been known to host slot machine rooms to fund their sporting activities for more than the past two decades prior to 2014, arose that called for additional safeguards to prevent gambling addicts from frequenting such places from Members of Parliament (MP) who had also raised concerns over current regulations following investigation of Tiong Bahru Football Club, an semi-professional football club in the National Football League, the second tier of national football league system. generated approximately 10 times more revenue from their 29-slot machine operations than what the Tampines Rovers, a professional football club in the S.League, had reportedly earned in their 2013/2014 financial year. Other noted cases included Sinchi Football Club, which continued to operate a clubhouse with six slot machines despite having not played in any S.League football game since 2005 and prompted a need to ensure profits from slot operations were going towards funding a club's core purpose--their football activities.

While football clubs and other registered societies that wanted to run slot machine operations were required to apply for a private lottery permit from police, a condition of the permit only required that entry and use of the slot machine rooms be restricted to members only, but a check by The Straits Times revealed that memberships could be purchased for as low as $5 in comparison to the $100 entrance fee of casinos at the time. MPs and gambling counsellors warned that these venues provided an easy and accessible outlet for gambling. A call for an urgent review of the regulations governing these private slot machine clubs was made by MP Seah Kian Peng, the Government Parliamentary Committees chair for Social and Family Development.

== Regulatory bodies ==
Prior to the formation of the Gambling Regulatory Authority (GRA), there were various regulatory bodies governing gambling in Singapore. As of 2022, GRA is the current single regulatory body overseeing gambling in Singapore. Plans for such an agency were announced two years prior to the launch as part of efforts to consolidate gambling enforcement by merging the Casino Regulatory Authority of Singapore (CRA) (formed in 2008 and controlled casinos) and MHA's Gambling Regulatory Unit (controlled fruit machines and remote gambling activities), as well as reform laws around them.
