= The MongolZ =

Mongolian esports organization

- Divisions: Chess; Counter-Strike 2 Dota 2 Mobile Legends: Bang Bang; PUBG Mobile; Valorant
- Founded: 2013; 13 years ago
- Location: Ulaanbaatar, Mongolia
- Manager: Bilguunbat "kaz" Enkhbayar (Founder, CEO); Nasandelger "darkis" Namsrai (Founder, COO); Munkhkhishig "Winter" Saruulgerel (Manager)
- Partners: Gobi Cashmere, 1xBet, ZOWIE, Pinecone Academy, CSGOSKINS, PirateSwap, Mongolian Government

The MongolZ is a Mongolian esports organization founded in 2013.

The organisation fields rosters in Counter-Strike 2, Dota 2, Mobile Legends: Bang Bang, PUBG Mobile and Chess, and previously competed in Valorant.

The MongolZ's Counter Strike team has enjoyed numerous international successes, winning the Intel Extreme Masters Season X Taipei championship in 2016 and, following the team's relaunch in 2023, the 2025 Esports World Cup.

The team also finished as runners-up at the Blast Austin Major 2025, becoming the first Asian team to reach a Counter-Strike Major Grand Final.

In February 2025, The MongolZ's Counter Strike team was recognised by the Mongolian government as the National Team of Mongolia. The team also became the first Asian team to reach No. 1 in the HLTV World Team Rankings, topping the rankings on 22 and 29 September 2025.

At IEM Beijing 2026, The MongolZ entered their group decider against FURIA as clear underdogs. They came from a map down to win 2-1, ending the world No. 1 team’s seven-series winning streak and advancing directly to the semi-finals. There, they beat pre-match favourites Natus Vincere 2-0 to reach their first major-event final in 14 months.

The organisation's Chess team also won the 2026 FIDE World Rapid and Blitz Team Chess Championship in the U2400 category.

The MongolZ rosters

Counter-Strike 2
Handle	Name	Nationality
bLitz	Byambasuren, Garidmagnai	Mongolia
Techno4K	Munkhbold, Sodbayar	Mongolia
910	Banzragch, Usukhbayar	Mongolia
cobrazera	Uuganbayar, Anarbileg	Mongolia
nin9	Gantulga, Yesuntumur	Mongolia
Coach	maaRaa	Bayanbat, Erdenedalai	Mongolia

Chess
Handle	Name	Nationality
Batkhuyag Munguntuul	Batkhuyag, Munguntuul	Mongolia

Legend:
- (I) Inactive
- (S) Suspended
- (L) On loan
- (2W) Two-way player
- Substitute
- (injured) Injury / Illness
