= Casino Regulatory Authority of Singapore =

Statutory board of the Government of Singapore

Agency overview
- Formed: 2 April 2008; 18 years ago
- Dissolved: 31 July 2022; 4 years ago
- Jurisdiction: Government of Singapore
- Headquarters: 460 Alexandra Road, #12-01, PSA Building, Singapore 119963
- Minister responsible: K Shanmugam, Minister for Home Affairs
- Agency executives: Tan Tee How, Chairman; Teo Chun Ching, Chief Executive
- Parent agency: Ministry of Home Affairs
- Website: http://www.cra.gov.sg

The Casino Regulatory Authority of Singapore (CRA) was a statutory board under the Ministry of Home Affairs of the Government of Singapore. It was formed on 2 April 2008 to regulate the management and operation of the casinos in Singapore.

The CRA was responsible for ensuring that the management and operation of the casinos in Singapore remained free from criminal influence or exploitation. It also ensured that gaming in a casino was conducted honestly, and that casinos did not cause harm to minors, vulnerable persons and society at large.

On 1 August 2022, it was reconstituted to form the Gambling Regulatory Authority of Singapore.

== Enforcement Actions ==
In 2017, the CRA imposed financial penalties of SGD$60,000 on the two casino operators for lapses in their security screening.

Marina Bay Sands was fined SGD$5,000 for failure to prevent one permanent resident from entering or remaining on its casino premises without a valid entry levy.

Resorts World Sentosa was fined SGD$55,000 for failures to prevent three minors and one excluded person gaining access to the casino floor.

Under the Casino Control Act, an entry levy is chargeable to Singapore citizens or permanent residents wishing to enter the casino area of each resort.

All patrons must also be aged 21 or over in order to gamble legally in its casinos.

== See also ==
- Gambling in Singapore
- Marina Bay Sands
- Resorts World Sentosa
