= Amoeba Management =

Management system designed by Kyocera founder Kazuo Inamori

Amoeba is a Management System designed by the creator and the late Kyocera honorary chairman, Kazuo Inamori. This management system was established in Kyocera and DDI (now KDDI)

== Summary ==
Amoebas are in general groups of 5 to 50 people, composed of personnel in a company, with a clearly defined purpose of making profit for itself. Profit is measured using this simple formula: ("Profit per hour = (sales - cost) ÷ working hours"). It is calculated in each amoeba with the goal being to identify and maximize profitability per hour.

Amoeba profit is usually calculated on a monthly or annual basis. The aim is to target plans into action, and create a system of metrics which can lead to increased efficiency working hours.

Amoebas keep changing from time to time, and the roles inside an amoeba are changed as well.

== Advantages ==
1. The number of members of an Amoeba is small, so the results appear immediately, thus it is easy to give personnel a sense of ownership.
2. It is easy to develop and identify leaders with management skills using the amoebas.
3. Since the profitability metrics of an amoeba are unified, it is easy to weed out the competition between amoebas.

== Drawbacks ==
1. Amoeba is too focused on its own profitability, thus making it easy to pursue the interests of the amoeba over those of the company as a whole.
2. It takes time to calculate the "profit per hour." If not calculated fairly, this method cannot be used as an adequate evaluation of profitability, or as a comparison against other amoebas.

== Adopters ==
- Kyocera
- KDDI
- Japan Airlines
- Disco Corporation
- Company Inc.
- Capcom
