= Kazuo Inamori =

Japanese philanthropist and entrepreneur (1932–2022)

- 稲盛 和夫
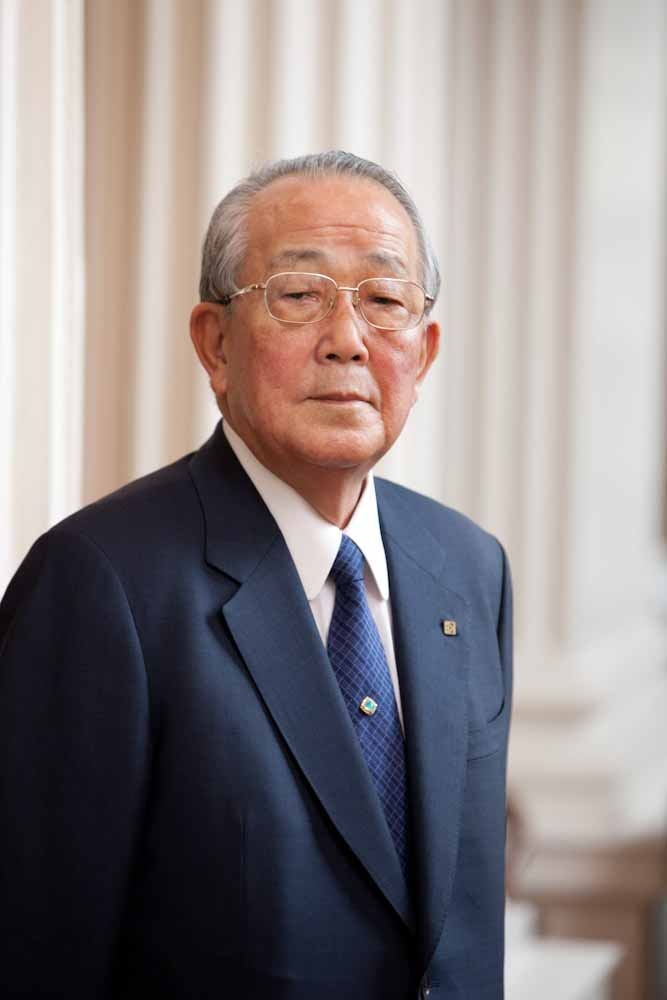
- Inamori in 2011
- Born: 21 January 1932; Kagoshima, Japan
- Died: 24 August 2022 (aged 90); Kyoto, Kyoto Prefecture, Japan
- Education: Kagoshima University
- Awards: Othmer Gold Medal
- Scientific career
- Fields: Engineering, Chemistry, Philanthropy, Management, Zen Buddhism

External videos
- Kazuo Inamori: A Conversation on Business Innovation and Philosophy (with English translation audio) , UC Berkeley

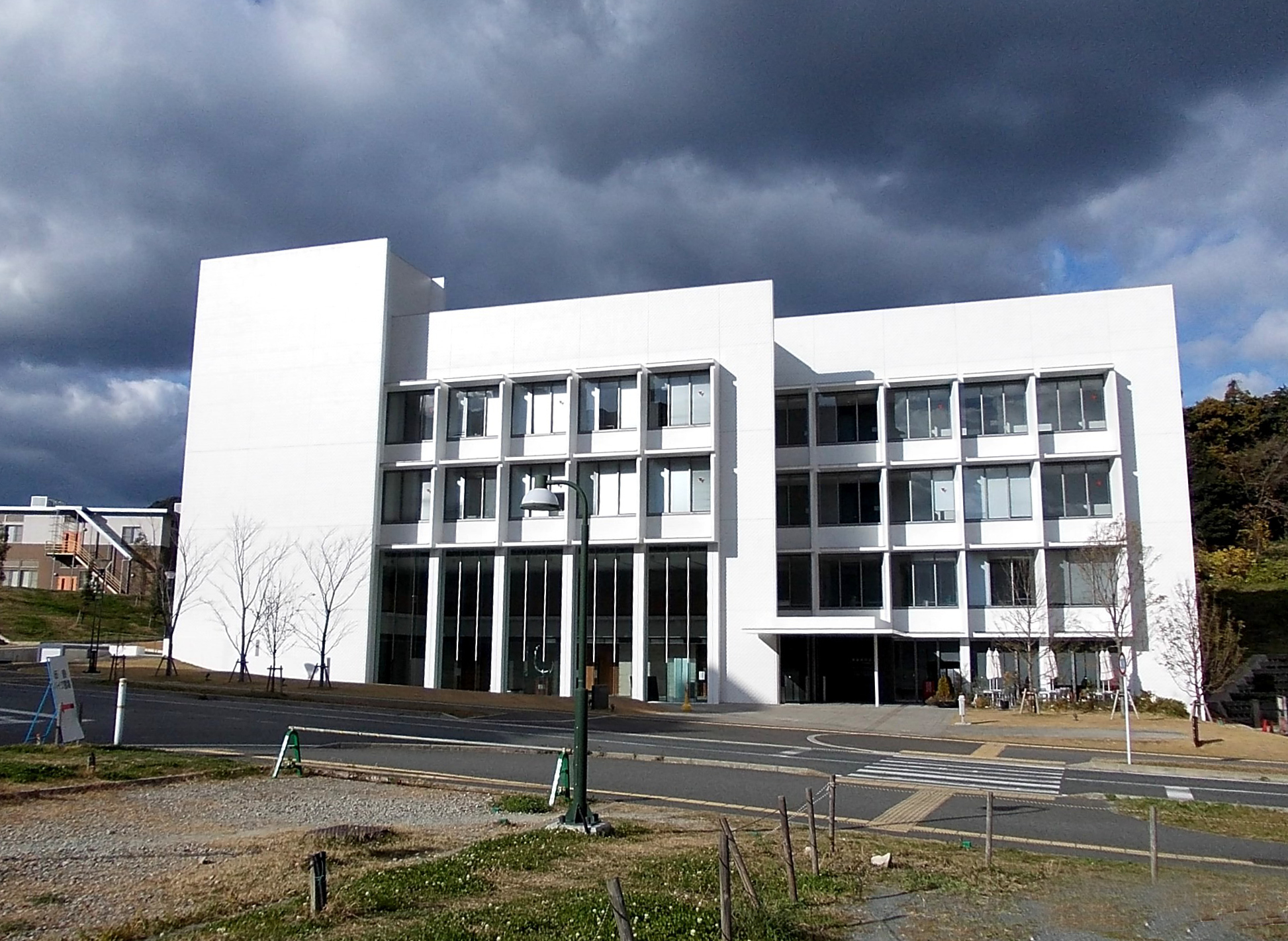
The Inamori Center on Kyushu University Ito campus

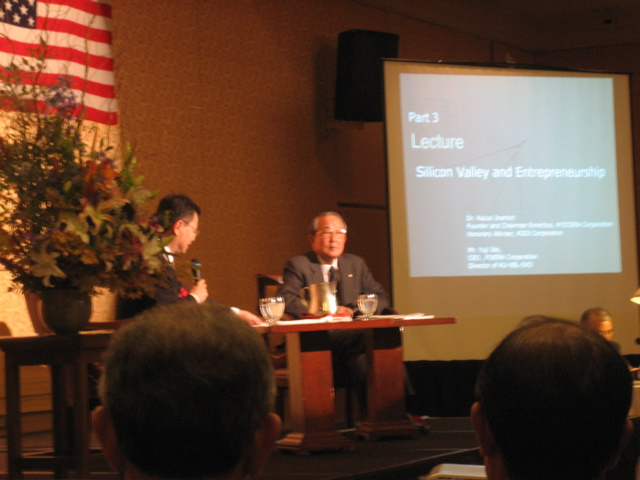
Kazuo Inamori (right) at the Crowne Plaza Cabana, in Palo Alto, CA

Kazuo Inamori, KBE (稲盛 和夫, Inamori Kazuo; 30 January 1932 – 24 August 2022) was a Japanese philanthropist, entrepreneur, Zen Buddhist priest, and the founder of Kyocera and KDDI. He was the chairman of Japan Airlines.

Inamori was elected as a member of the National Academy of Engineering in 2000 for innovation in ceramic materials and solar cell development/manufacturing, entrepreneurship of advanced technologies, and for being a role model for relating science to society.

In 2011, he received the Othmer Gold Medal for outstanding contributions to progress in science and chemistry.

== Biography ==
Kazuo Inamori was born on 30 January 1932 in Kagoshima, Kyushu, Japan, to Keiichi and Kimi Inamori. He was the second eldest of seven children. Inamori graduated from Kagoshima University in 1955 with a Bachelor of Science degree in applied chemistry and became a researcher at Shofu Industries in Kyoto. There, he was important in several developments, including the use of forsterite as an insulator for high frequency radio waves, its use for mass production of high frequency insulator components, and the development of an electric tunnel kiln for use in sintering.

In 1959, Inamori and several other colleagues established Kyoto Ceramic, later known as Kyocera. The company manufactured high-frequency insulator components for television picture tubes for Matsushita Electronics Industries (later Panasonic) in Japan, and silicon transistor headers for Fairchild Semiconductor and ceramic substrates for IBM in the United States. At Kyocera, Inamori implemented his Amoeba Management system.

After deregulation of Japan’s telecommunications industry in 1984, Inamori founded Daini Denden (DDI) Corporation. DDI later entered the cell phone business, merging with KDD (Kokusai Denshin Denwa) and IDO (Nippon Idou Tsushin Corporation) in 2000 to form KDDI, which has grown to become Japan's second-largest telecommunication services provider.

In September 1997, Inamori took the name Daiwa and became a lay priest at Enpukuji Temple in Kyoto. However, at the age of 77, the Japanese government asked him to come out of retirement to help save the national airline, Japan Airlines (JAL). Inamori became the president of Japan Airlines when it entered bankruptcy protection on 19 January 2010, and led the air carrier through its restructuring, eventually allowing the company to re-list on the Tokyo Stock Exchange in November 2012. Inamori has been an International Advisor of Goldman Sachs Group, Inc.

On 24 August 2022, Inamori died at the age of 90.

== Philanthropy ==
Inamori, who was a Zen Buddhist priest, established the Inamori Foundation in 1984, which awards the annual Kyoto Prize to honor those who have made "extraordinary contributions to science, civilization, and the spirituality of humankind."

In 2005, the Alfred University School of Engineering (Alfred, NY) was renamed in honor of Dr. Inamori. He endowed the Inamori Scholarship fund in 1996, doubling the fund in 2004. In Dr. Inamori's honor, the Kyocera Corporation has given a $10 million endowment to enable expansion of the Kazuo Inamori School of Engineering's research faculty.

In 2005, Inamori helped to establish the Inamori International Center for Ethics and Excellence at Case Western Reserve University (Cleveland, Ohio), with a gift of $10 million. The center awards the Inamori Ethics Prize to those who serve as examples of ethical leadership and make significant contributions to the betterment of global society.

== Awards and honors ==
Inamori has received many awards and honors, including:

- Honorary Doctorate from Kagoshima University, 1999
- Honorary Doctor of Science from Alfred University, 1988
- Honorary Doctorate from Kyushu University, 2006
- Honorary Doctorate from Kyoto Institute of Technology, 2010
- International Citizens Award, Japan America Society of Southern California, 2011
- Honorary Doctorate of Science, San Diego State University
- Othmer Gold Medal, 2011
- Honorary Knight Commander of the Order of the British Empire, 2019
