= National Council on Problem Gambling (Singapore) =

Council to address problem gambling

Agency overview
- Formed: 31 August 2005; 20 years ago
- Jurisdiction: Government of Singapore
- Agency executive: Sim Gim Guan, Chairman
- Parent department: Ministry of Social and Family Development
- Website: www.ncpg.org.sg

The National Council on Problem Gambling (NCPG) is a statutory board under the Ministry of Social and Family Development of the Government of Singapore. It was established on 31 August 2005 to address problem gambling, following the government's decision to legalise casino gambling and build two integrated resorts at Marina Bay and Sentosa.

The council is chaired by Sim Gim Guan and has 17 members.

One of the main tasks of NCPG is to promote public awareness on problem gambling. In January 2006, a TV series Bet Your Life was launched to examine problem gambling and its effects on families and society. A fund of S$150,000 was also set aside for public education programmes initiated by voluntary welfare organisations.

To counsel and help compulsive gamblers, two hotlines are set up by the Institute of Mental Health (IMH) and Thye Hua Kwan Moral Society.

In 2014. NCPG released an advertisement cautioning against gambling during the 2014 FIFA World Cup. It showed a crestfallen boy hoping that Germany would win the World Cup as his father had bet his life savings on them. This backfired when Germany beat Brazil 7-1 in the Semi-Finals, going on to win the World Cup.

In 2014, during an investigation of Tiong Bahru Football Club, which operated a slot machine room, public attention was focused on gambling inside registered societies who have slot machines. Access to such slot machines is viewed as a backdoor to gambling addicts who are banned via NCPG as their access to such societies are not banned.

In 2017, only 24 out of 93 private clubs are in the exclusion list by the NCPG.

== See also ==
- Gambling in Singapore
