= ELEAGUE Major 2017 =

Counter-Strike: Global Offensive Major Championship

- 2017
- The ELEAGUE Major 2017 logo

Tournament information
- Sport: Counter-Strike: Global Offensive
- Location: Atlanta, Georgia, United States
- Dates: January 22, 2017–January 29, 2017
- Administrator: Valve; ELEAGUE
- Tournament format(s): 16 team swiss-system group stage 8 team single-elimination playoff
- Venue: Fox Theatre
- Teams: 16 teams
- Purse: $1,000,000 USD

Final positions
- Champions: Astralis
- 1st runners-up: Virtus.pro
- 2nd runners-up: SK Gaming; Fnatic
- MVP: Markus "Kjaerbye" Kjærbye

ELEAGUE Major: Atlanta 2017, also known as ELEAGUE Major 2017 or Atlanta 2017, was the tenth Counter-Strike: Global Offensive Major Championship. It was organized by ELEAGUE and held in Atlanta, Georgia, United States from January 22 to 29, 2017. It featured sixteen professional teams from around the world. Eight teams directly qualified based on their top eight placement in the last major, ESL One Cologne 2016, while another eight teams qualified through the ELEAGUE Offline Major Qualifier. ELEAGUE Major was the third consecutive Major with a prize pool of $1,000,000.

The playoff stage consisted of eight teams. Astralis, Fnatic, Gambit Gaming, Natus Vincere, SK Gaming, and Virtus.pro were returning Legends. FaZe Clan and North were new Legends, replacing FlipSid3 Tactics and Team Liquid, who failed to make it past the group stage. The grand finals pitted Astralis, in its first ever final after nine playoff appearances, and Virtus.pro, which was in its second finals and looking for its second major title. Astralis had defeated Natus Vincere and Fnatic in the playoff stage, while Virtus.pro had beaten North and defending champions SK Gaming. In the third map of the best-of-three final, Astralis edged out Virtus.pro in the final round of regulation for its first major title.

== Background ==
Counter-Strike: Global Offensive (CS:GO) is a multiplayer first-person shooter video game developed by Hidden Path Entertainment and Valve. It is the fourth game in the Counter-Strike series. In professional CS:GO, the Valve-sponsored Majors are the most prestigious tournaments.

Entering the 2017 ELEAGUE Major, the two-time defending champion was SK Gaming, which won both MLG Columbus 2016 (as Luminosity Gaming) and ESL One Cologne 2016. SK was also the first non-European team to win a Major. At the time, Fnatic was the most decorated team, with three Majors, and SK Gaming was in second, with two.

== Format ==
The top eight teams from the ESL One Cologne 2016 ("Legends") were automatically invited to ESL One Cologne 2016. The remaining eight spots were filled by teams that advanced from the ELEAGUE Major Main Qualifier. The ELEAGUE Main Qualifier was a 16-team tournament consisting of the bottom eight teams from Cologne 2016, as well as eight teams promoted from four regional qualifiers. The top eight teams at the Main Qualifier then advanced to the Major as the "Challengers".

Unlike previous Majors, which used the GSL-format for group stages, this Major was the first to use the Swiss-system for group stages. The top eight teams at the end of the group stage advanced to the playoff stage. All playoff matches were best-of-three, single elimination.

=== Map pool ===
The seven-map pool did not change from Cologne 2016. Before each best-of-one match in the group stage, teams alternated banning maps until five maps had been banned. One of the two remaining maps was randomly selected, and the team that that did not get a third ban then selected which side it wanted to start on. In all best-of-three series, each team first banned a map, leaving a five-map pool. Each team then chose a map, with the opposing team selecting which side they wanted to start on for their opponent's map choice. The two map picks were the first two maps in the best-of-three. The teams then each banned one more map, leaving one map remaining for the best-of-three decider if necessary.

Maps

- Cache
- Cobblestone
- Dust II
- Mirage
- Nuke
- Overpass
- Train

== Broadcast talent ==
ELEAGUE retained much of the broadcast team that had been featured in ELEAGUE Season 1 and Season 2.

Hosts

- Sue "Smix" Lee
- Chris Puckett

Analysts

- Richard Lewis
- Jason "moses" O'Toole
- Duncan "Thorin" Shields

Commentators

- James Bardolph
- Anders Blume
- Henry "HenryG" Greer
- Daniel "ddk" Kapadia
- Auguste "Semmler" Massonnat
- Matthew "Sadokist" Trivett

Observers

- Kevin "kVIN_S" Swift
- David DJ "Prius" Kuntz
- Benjamin "CoffeeMcSwagger" Budka

Others

- Jason "Alchemist" Baker (Producer)
- Steve Daily (Director)
- Reece Fowler (Gameplay Director)

=== Broadcasts ===
All streams were broadcast on Twitch in various languages.

- ELEAGUE TV
- 99Damage
- BiDa
- HuomaoTV
- Ogaming TV
- SpilerTV
- Starladder

== Major qualifier ==
Like the previous Majors, there was a single Main Qualifier after four Minors, or regional qualifiers. The bottom eight teams from ESL One Cologne 2016 received automatic bids to the Main Qualifier. Two teams each from the Asia, North America, Europe, and CIS Minors also competed in the Main Qualifier.

=== Regional qualifiers ===
The final four teams from each qualifier are shown below: two from each moved on to the Main Qualifier.

==== Asia Minor ====
Teams

- Renegades (Invited)
- TyLoo (Invited)
- VG.CyberZen (China)
- MVP Project (East Asia)
- BOT (India + Middle East)
- Athletico (Oceanic)
- Fire Dragoon E-Sport (SEA)
- Tean nxl (SEA)

Upper round 1
A1	TyLoo	0
B2	VG.CyberZen	2
B1	Renegades	2
A2	MVP Project	0
Lower round 1
A1	TyLoo	2
A2	MVP Project	0

Upper final
B2	VG.CyberZen	0
B1	Renegades	2
Lower final
B2	VG.CyberZen	1
A1	TyLoo	2

Final
B1	Renegades	0
A1	TyLoo	2

==== Europe Minor ====
Teams

- GODSENT (Invited)
- HellRaisers (Invited)
- Heroic (Invited)
- Space Soldiers (Invited)
- ENCE eSports (Qualifier #1)
- Epsilon eSports (Qualifier #1)
- ALTERNATE aTTaX (Qualifier #2)
- Team LDLC.com (Qualifier #2)

Upper round 1
A1	Space Soldiers	0
B2	HellRaisers	2
B1	Epsilon eSports	1
A2	GODSENT	2
Lower round 1
A1	Space Soldiers	0
B!	Epsilon eSports	2

Upper final
B2	HellRaisers	2
A2	GODSENT	0
Lower final
A2	GODSENT	2
B1	Epsilon eSports	1

Final
B2	HellRaisers	1
A2	GODSENT	2

==== CIS Minor ====
Teams

- ALL-IN (High Seed)
- RoX (High Seed)
- Team Spirit (High Seed)
- Tengri (High Seed)
- EYESport (Low Seed)
- Quantum Bellator Fire (Low Seed)
- VwS Gaming (Low Seed)
- zARLANS (Low Seed)

Upper round 1
B1	Team Spirit	2
A2	VwS Gaming	0
A1	ALL-IN	2
B2	Q.B. Fire	0
Lower round 1
A2	VwS Gaming	1
B2	Q.B. Fire	0

Upper final
B1	Team Spirit	2
A1	ALL-IN	1
Lower final
A1	ALL-IN	1
A2	VwS Gaming	0

Final
B1	Team Spirit	0
A1	ALL-IN	2

==== Americas Minor ====
Teams

- Cloud9 (Invited)
- Echo Fox (Invited)
- Immortals (Invited)
- Team SoloMid (Invited)
- Selfless Gaming (Qualifier #1)
- Splyce (Qualifier #1)
- Muffin Lightning (Qualifier #2)
- paiN Gaming (Qualifier #2)

Upper round 1
1	Cloud9	1
4	Muffin Lightning	0
2	Immortals	1
3	Team SoloMid	0
Lower round 1
4	Muffin Lightning	0
3	Team SoloMid	2

Upper final
1	Cloud9	0
2	Immortals	2
Lower final
1	Cloud9	2
3	Team SoloMid	0

Qualified
2	Immortals
1	Cloud9

=== Main Qualifier ===
The Main Qualifier was a sixteen-team Swiss-system tournament in which, after the first round, teams only played other teams with the same win–loss record. Each match was best-of-one, and no team played another team twice. All teams played until they had either won or lost three games: any team with three wins advanced to the Major, and any team with three losses was eliminated.

First round seeding was determined by the following:

- Teams that placed 9th–12th at the previous Major (Team Dignitas, FaZe Clan, mousesports, Ninjas in Pyjamas) were first seeds
- Teams that placed 13th–16th at the previous Major (Team EnVyUs, G2 Esports, OpTic Gaming, Counter Logic Gaming) were second seeds
- Teams that placed first in their regional qualifiers (TyLoo, Vega Squadron, GODSENT, Immortals) were third seeds
- Teams that were runners-up in their regional qualifiers (Renegades, Team Spirit, Hellraisers, Cloud9) were fourth seeds

GODSENT and FaZe Clan were the first teams to advance to the Major. The next three teams to move on were mousesports, OpTic Gaming, and Team Dignitas. In the fifth round of matches, the final teams to move on were Team EnVyUs, G2 Esports, and HellRaisers.

==== Teams ====
Cologne 2016 Bottom 8

- mousesports
- Ninjas in Pyjamas
- Team Dignitas
- FaZe Clan
- Team EnVyUs
- G2 Esports
- OpTic Gaming
- Counter Logic Gaming

Regional Qualifiers

- Immortals (Americas Minor #1)
- Cloud9 (Americas Minor #2)
- TyLoo (Asia Minor #1)
- Renegades (Asia Minor #2)
- Vega Squadron (Note: The players of ALL-IN were signed by Vega Squadron after the CIS Minor.) (CIS Minor #1)
- Team Spirit (CIS Minor #2)
- GODSENT (Europe Minor #1)
- HellRaisers (Europe Minor #2)

Main Qualifier Results

Place	Team	Record	Differential	Round 1	Round 2	Round 3	Round 4	Round 5
1–2	GODSENT	3–0	+15	G2 Esports; 16–11; Overpass	High match Team Dignitas; 16–11; Mirage	High match HellRaisers; 16–11; Train	Qualified	Qualified
1–2	FaZe Clan	3–0	+12	Cloud9; 19–17; Mirage	High match OpTic Gaming; 16–11; Overpass	High match Immortals; 16–11; Mirage	Qualified	Qualified
3–5	mousesports	3–1	+27	HellRaisers; 6–16; Train	Low match Team Spirit; 16–5; Dust II	Mid match Tyloo; 16–3; Train	High match Immortals; 16–3; Cache	Qualified
3–5	OpTic Gaming	3–1	+15	TyLoo; 16–9; Overpass	High match FaZe Clan; 11–16; Overpass	Mid match Ninjas in Pyjamas; 16–9; Overpass	High match Hellraisers; 16–10; Train	Qualified
3–5	Team Dignitas	3–1	+14	Team Spirit; 16–11; Mirage	High match GODSENT; 11–16; Mirage	Mid match Counter Logic Gaming; 16–9; Mirage	High match G2 Esports; 16–9; Nuke	Qualified
6–8	Team EnVyUs	3–2	+12	Immortals; 11–16; Cobblestone	Low match G2 Esports; 12–16; Dust II	Low match Team Spirit; 16–2; Dust II	Low match TyLoo; 16–9; Dust II	Vega Squadron; 16–12; Dust II
6–8	G2 Esports	3–2	+4	GODSENT; 11–16; Overpass	Low match Team EnVyUs; 16–12; Dust II	Mid match Vega Squadron; 16–6; Dust II	High match Team Dignitas; 9–16; Nuke	Immortals; 19–17; Cache
6–8	HellRaisers	3–2	+3	mousesports 16–6; Train	High match Ninjas in Pyjamas; 19–17; Overpass	High match GODSENT; 11–16; Train	High match OpTic Gaming; 10–16; Train	Cloud9; 16–13; Overpass
9–11	Cloud9	2–3	+6	FaZe Clan; 17–19; Mirage	Low match TyLoo; 11–16; Mirage	Low match Renegades; 16–9; Mirage	Low match Counter Logic Gaming Overpass	HellRaisers; 13–16; Overpass
9–11	Vega Squadron	2–3	−6	Counter Logic Gaming; 16–14; Mirage	High match Immortals; 8–16; Cache	Mid match G2 Esports; 6–16; Dust II	Low match Ninjas in Pyjamas; 16–2; Cache	Team EnVyUs; 12–16; Dust II
9–11	Immortals	2–3	−7	Team EnVyUs; 16–11; Cobblestone	High match Vega Squadron; 16–8; Cache	High match FaZe Clan; 11–16; Mirage	High match mousesports 3–16; Cache	G2 Esports; 17–19; Cache
12–14	Counter Logic Gaming	1–3	−13	Vega Squadron; 14–16; Mirage	Low match Renegades; 19–16; Dust II	Mid match Team Dignitas; 9–16; Mirage	Low match Cloud9; 8–16; Overpass	Eliminated
12–14	Ninjas in Pyjamas	1–3	−16	Renegades; 16–9; Dust II	High match HellRaisers; 17–19; Overpass	Mid match OpTic Gaming; 9–16; Overpass	Low match Vega Squadron; 2–16; Cache	Eliminated
12–14	TyLoo	1–3	−22	OpTic Gaming; 9–16; Overpass	Low match Cloud9; 16–11; Mirage	Mid match mousesports 3–16; Train	Low match Team EnVyUs; 9–16; Dust II	Eliminated
15–16	Renegades	0–3	−17	Ninjas in Pyjamas; 9–16; Dust II	Low match Counter Logic Gaming; 16–19; Dust II	Low match Cloud9; 9–16; Mirage	Eliminated	Eliminated
15–16	Team Spirit	0–3	−30	Team Dignitas; 11–16; Mirage	Low match mousesports 5–16; Dust II	Low match Team EnVyUs; 2–16; Dust II	Eliminated	Eliminated

== Teams competing ==
The top eight teams from ESL One Cologne 2016, the Legends, were joined by the eight teams to advance from the main qualifier, the Challengers.

Legends

- SK Gaming
- Team Liquid
- Virtus.pro
- Fnatic
- Astralis
- FlipSid3 Tactics
- Gambit Gaming
- Natus Vincere

Challengers

- GODSENT
- FaZe Clan
- OpTic Gaming
- mousesports
- Team EnVyUs
- G2 Esports
- North^{1}
- HellRaisers

^{1} The five players and coach of Team Dignitas mutually part ways with the team shortly after the Major Qualifier. The roster is then signed by the Danish football (soccer) club F.C. Copenhagen and Nordisk Film was named North.

Perhaps the biggest change was Team Dignitas and the Philadelphia 76ers and their players and coach mutually parting ways and the organizations announced plans to build a North American roster; in addition, it plans to invest into positions such as a sports psychologist and a nutritionist. The coach, Casper "ruggah" Due, said, despite "competitive offers," the roster decided to leave the team. Roughly a day later, the team is reported to sign with the Danish football (soccer) club F.C. Copenhagen and the Denmark-based Nordisk Film and officially signed on January 3, 2016. The team will be called North.

GODSENT acquired Robin "flusha" Rönnquist, Jesper "JW" Wecksell, and Freddy "KRiMZ" Johansson from Fnatic, who acquired Jonas "Lekr0" Olofsson and Simon "twist" Eliasson, so GODSENT acquired the Legends spot from Fnatic. However, KRiMZ rejoined Fnatic while Lekr0 rejoined GODSENT, giving the Legends spot back to Fnatic.

=== Pre-major ranking ===
The HLTV.org January 16, 2017 ranking, the final one released before the ELEAGUE Major, is displayed below.

HLTV.org Pre-major Ranking

World Ranking
Place	Team	Points	Move^{†}
1	Astralis	967	Steady
2	OpTic Gaming	792	▲1
3	SK Gaming	773	▼1
5	Virtus.pro	611	▲1
6	North	560	▼1
7	FaZe Clan	519	Steady
8	Team EnVyUs	457	▲3
10	G2 Esports	368	Steady
11	Natus Vincere	348	▼2
12	mousesports	319	Steady
14	Gambit Gaming	209	▲2
16	GODSENT	190	▼2
17	Team Liquid	175	▼2
18	FlipSid3 Tactics	166	▲4
19	HellRaisers	153	▼2
20	Fnatic	135	▼1

^{†}Change since January 9, 2017 ranking

== Group stage ==
The group stage was a sixteen-team Swiss-system format in which, after the first round, teams only played other teams with the same win–loss record. Each match was best-of-one, and no team played another team twice. All teams played until they had either won or lost three games: any team with three wins advanced to the playoff stage, and any team with three losses was eliminated.

First round seeding was determined by the following:

- Teams that placed top four at the previous Major (SK Gaming, Team Liquid, Fnatic, Virtus.pro) were first seeds
- Teams that placed 5th–8th place at the previous Major (Astralis, FlipSid3 Tactics, Gambit Gaming, Natus Vincere) were second seeds
- Teams that placed first in the main qualifier (GODSENT, FaZe Clan) and the top two teams that placed third based on their seeds going into the major qualifier (North, mousesports) were third seeds
- The remaining teams (OpTic Gaming, Team EnVyUs, G2 Esports, HellRaisers) were fourth seeds

In the first round, first seeds played a randomly drawn fourth seed, and second seeds played a randomly drawn third seed. After this round, teams were randomly drawn against other teams with the same record (e.g., 1–0 teams against 1–0 teams, 0–1 teams against 0–1 teams). The eight teams to win three (out of a possible five) games were granted "Legend" status and an automatic invitation to the next Major.

This was the first Major in which GODSENT players Robin "flusha" Rönnquist and Jesper "JW" Wecksell did not advance to the playoffs, after losing to North in the fifth round and placing 9th. They had maintained Legend status with Fnatic prior to transferring to GODSENT.

Place	Team	Record	Differential	Round 1	Round 2	Round 3	Round 4	Round 5
1–2	Natus Vincere	3–0	+36	mousesports 16–3; Cobblestone	High match Team EnVyUs; 16–6; Cobblestone	High match SK Gaming; 16–3; Dust II	Playoffs	Playoffs
1–2	Virtus.pro	3–0	+11	OpTic Gaming; 16–13; Cobblestone	High match G2 Esports; 16–14; Nuke	High match Gambit Gaming; 16–10; Train	Playoffs	Playoffs
3–5	Gambit Gaming	3–1	+11	North; 16–8; Cobblestone	High match GODSENT; 16–9; Overpass	High match Virtus.pro; 10–16; Train	High match FaZe Clan; 16–14; Overpass	Playoffs
3–5	Fnatic	3–1	+7	G2 Esports; 10–16; Cache	Low match North; 16–13; Cobblestone	Mid match mousesports 16–11; Dust II	High match Team EnVyUs; 16–11; Cobblestone	Playoffs
3–5	SK Gaming	3–1	0	HellRaisers; 16–7; Mirage	High match FaZe Clan; 19–17; Mirage	High match Natus Vincere; 3–16; Dust II	High match Astralis; 19–17; Dust II	Playoffs
6–8	Astralis	3–2	+15	GODSENT; 6–16; Train	Low match OpTic Gaming; 16–12; Train	Mid match G2 Esports; 16–5; Train	High match SK Gaming; 17–19; Dust II	Team Liquid; 16–3; Mirage
6–8	FaZe Clan	3–2	+12	FlipSid3 Tactics; 16–9; Nuke	High match SK Gaming; 17–19; Mirage	Mid match Team Liquid; 22–18; Nuke	High match Gambit Gaming; 14–16; Overpass	Team EnVyUs; 16–11; Nuke
6–8	North	3–2	+2	Gambit Gaming; 8–16; Cobblestone	Low match Fnatic; 13–16; Cobblestone	Low match HellRaisers; 19–15; Mirage	Low match G2 Esports; 16–9; Overpass	GODSENT; 19–17; Overpass
9–11	Team EnVyUs	2–3	−3	Team Liquid; 25–21; Cache	High match Natus Vincere; 6–16; Cobblestone	Mid match GODSENT; 16–13; Cache	High match Fnatic; 11–16; Cobblestone	FaZe Clan; 11–16; Nuke
9–11	GODSENT	2–3	−4	Astralis; 16–6; Train	High match Gambit Gaming; 9–16; Overpass	Mid match Team EnVyUs; 3–16; Cache	Low match OpTic Gaming; 16–8; Cache	North; 17–19; Overpass
9–11	Team Liquid	2–3	−7	Team EnVyUs; 21–25; Cache	Low match FlipSid3 Tactics; 16–14; Overpass	Mid match FaZe Clan; 18–22; Nuke	Low match mousesports 16–4; Nuke	Astralis; 3–16; Mirage
12–14	G2 Esports	1–3	−11	Fnatic; 16–10; Cache	High match Virtus.pro; 14–16; Nuke	Mid match Astralis; 11–16; Train	Low match North; 9–16; Overpass	Eliminated
12–14	OpTic Gaming	1–3	−12	Virtus.pro; 13–16; Cobblestone	Low match Astralis; 12–16; Train	Low match FlipSid3 Tactics; 16–13; Train	Low match GODSENT; 8–16; Cache	Eliminated
12–14	mousesports	1–3	−22	Natus Vincere; 3–16; Cobblestone	Low match HellRaisers; 16–7; Cache	Mid match Fnatic; 11–16; Dust II	Low match Team Liquid; 4–16; Nuke	Eliminated
15–16	FlipSid3 Tactics	0–3	−12	FaZe Clan; 9–16; Nuke	Low match Team Liquid; 14–16; Overpass	Low match OpTic Gaming; 13–16; Train	Eliminated	Eliminated
15–16	HellRaisers	0–3	−22	SK Gaming; 7–16; Mirage	Low match mousesports 7–16; Cache	Low match North; 15–19; Mirage	Eliminated	Eliminated

== Playoffs ==
=== Bracket ===
Natus Vincere and Virtus.pro were the top seeds after the group stage, and would face a random opponent from the pool of Astralis, FaZe Clan, and North (the teams who finished 3–2). Natus Vincere was paired with Astralis and Virtus.pro drew North. From the pool of Gambit Gaming, Fnatic, and SK Gaming (the teams who finished 3–1), Gambit and Fnatic were randomly drawn to face each other. The remaining two teams, SK Gaming and FaZe Clan, were then paired to finalize the bracket.

Quarterfinals
Natus Vincere	1
Astralis	2
Gambit Gaming	1
Fnatic	2
Virtus.pro	2
North	1
SK Gaming	2
FaZe Clan	1

Semifinals
Astralis	2
Fnatic	0
Virtus.pro	2
SK Gaming	0

Finals
Astralis	2
Virtus.pro	1

=== Quarterfinals ===
==== Natus Vincere vs. Astralis ====
Casters: James Bardolph & ddk

The first game of the playoffs in the Fox Theatre pitted Natus Vincere and Astralis against each other.

Natus Vincere vs. Astralis Scores
Team	Score	Map	Score	Team
Natus Vincere	7	Overpass	16	Astralis
Natus Vincere	16	Mirage	14	Astralis
Natus Vincere	10	Dust II	16	Astralis

==== Gambit Gaming vs Fnatic ====
Casters: Anders Blume & Semmler

Gambit Gaming vs. Fnatic Scores
Team	Score	Map	Score	Team
Gambit Gaming	7	Cache	16	Fnatic
Gambit Gaming	16	Overpass	3	Fnatic
Gambit Gaming	7	Dust II	16	Fnatic

==== Virtus.pro vs North ====
Casters: Sadokist & HenryG

Virtus.pro was the other team along with Na'Vi to go a perfect 3–0 in the group stage, defeating OpTic Gaming, G2 Esports, and Gambit Gaming.

Virtus.pro vs North Scores
Team	Score	Map	Score	Team
Virtus.pro	16	Overpass	4	North
Virtus.pro	12	Cache	16	North
Virtus.pro	16	Cobblestone	13	North

==== SK Gaming vs FaZe Clan ====
Casters: Anders Blume & Semmler

SK Gaming was considered the world's best team of 2016 after winning the two majors of the year, MLG Columbus 2016 and ESL One Cologne 2016, and could be the first team ever to win three major titles in a row.

SK Gaming vs. FaZe Clan Scores
Team	Score	Map	Score	Team
SK Gaming	7	Mirage	16	FaZe Clan
SK Gaming	16	Train	3	FaZe Clan
SK Gaming	16	Overpass	5	FaZe Clan

=== Semifinals ===
==== Astralis vs Fnatic ====
Casters: Sadokist & HenryG

Astralis vs. Fnatic Scores
Team	Score	Map	Score	Team
Astralis	19	Cache	16	Fnatic
Astralis	16	Nuke	5	Fnatic
Astralis	–	Dust II	–	Fnatic

==== Virtus.pro vs SK Gaming ====
Casters: James Bardolph & ddk

The two-time defending champions in SK Gaming will faced off against Virtus.pro for the third Major in a row, with SK squeaking past Virtus.pro in both of those prior series.

Virtus.pro vs. SK Gaming Scores
Team	Score	Map	Score	Team
Virtus.pro	19	Train	17	SK Gaming
Virtus.pro	16	Cobblestone	14	SK Gaming
Virtus.pro	–	Overpass	–	SK Gaming

=== Finals ===
Casters: Anders Blume & Semmler

After five quarterfinal and four semifinal eliminations, the roster of Astralis finally made the a grand finals at a Major. Virtus.pro, however, had been to and won a Major final at EMS One Katowice 2014, defeating the Ninjas in Pyjamas two games to zero. Since then, Virtus.pro had not been back to a grand finals.

The first map was Nuke, a map Virtus.pro was considered very strong on. Astralis would tie the game at 12 rounds apiece, but Virtus.pro won the next four rounds, taking the first map 16–12. Snax and byali lead the way for the Polish team with 24 kills while Kjaerbye lead Astralis with 22 kills and gla1ve and dev1ce had 20 kills.

The second map was Overpass. Virtus.pro took the lead for the first time since round one at 14–13 and were two rounds away from taking the Major. However, Astralis won the last three rounds, taking Overpass 16–14. Xyp9x was the most impactful with 28 kills. dev1ce had the least kills of either team with only 13 kills.

The final map, Train, was historically known as one of Virtus.pro's strongest. After a strong Virtus.pro start, Astralis made a late comeback, tying the score at 14 and taking their first lead at 15–14. After winning the final round of regulation, Astralis was crowned the champion of the ELEAGUE Atlanta Major. Kjaerbye had 29 kills in the final map, and was named the Major MVP; he became the youngest player to earn the title.

Astralis vs. Virtus.pro Scores
Team	Score	Map	Score	Team
Astralis	12	Nuke	16	Virtus.pro
Astralis	16	Overpass	14	Virtus.pro
Astralis	16	Train	14	Virtus.pro

== Final standings ==
The final standings are shown below. The in-game leaders of each team are shown first.

Place	Prize money	Team	Invitation to following Major	Roster	Coach
1st	US$500,000	Astralis	PGL Major 2017	gla1ve, dev1ce, dupreeh, Xyp9x, Kjaerbye	zonic
2nd	US$150,000	Virtus.pro	PGL Major 2017	NEO, TaZ, pashaBiceps, Snax, byali	kuben
3rd – 4th	US$70,000	Fnatic	PGL Major 2017	dennis, olofmeister, KRiMZ, disco doplan, twist,	Jumpy
3rd – 4th	US$70,000	SK Gaming	PGL Major 2017	FalleN, coldzera, fer, TACO, fox	dead
5th – 8th	US$35,000	Natus Vincere	PGL Major 2017	seized, s1mple, Edward, flamie, GuardiaN	starix
5th – 8th	US$35,000	Gambit Gaming	PGL Major 2017	Zeus, AdreN, mou, HObbit, Dosia	kane
5th – 8th	US$35,000	North	PGL Major 2017	MSL, k0nfig, cajunb, Magisk, RUBINO	ruggah
5th – 8th	US$35,000	FaZe Clan	PGL Major 2017	karrigan, rain, aizy, allu, kioShiMa	RobbaN
9th – 11th	US$8,750	GODSENT	PGL Major 2017 Offline Qualifier	pronax, flusha, JW, Lekr0, pronax, znajder	rdl
9th – 11th	US$8,750	Team EnVyUs	PGL Major 2017 Offline Qualifier	Happy, kennyS, apEX, SIXER, NBK-	enkay J
9th – 11th	US$8,750	Team Liquid	PGL Major 2017 Offline Qualifier	nitr0, Hiko, ELiGE, jdm64, Pimp	zews
12th – 14th	US$8,750	G2 Esports	PGL Major 2017 Offline Qualifier	shox, SmithZz, bodyy, Rpk, ScreaM	NiaK
12th – 14th	US$8,750	mousesports	PGL Major 2017 Offline Qualifier	NiKo, Spiidi, denis, chrisJ, loWel	lmbt
12th – 14th	US$8,750	OpTic Gaming	PGL Major 2017 Offline Qualifier	stanislaw, NAF, RUSH, tarik, mixwell	–
15th – 16th	US$8,750	HellRaisers	PGL Major 2017 Offline Qualifier	ANGE1, bondik, Zero, STYKO, DeadFox	Johnta
15th – 16th	US$8,750	FlipSid3 Tactics	PGL Major 2017 Offline Qualifier	Blad3, markeloff, WorldEdit, electronic, wayLander	–

=== Post-Major Ranking ===
The HLTV.org January 30, 2017 rankings of teams in the major is displayed below. The ranking was the first one released after the ELEAGUE Major.

HLTV.org Post-major Ranking

World Ranking
Place	Team	Points	Move^{†}
1	Astralis	1000	Steady
2	Virtus.pro	705	▲2
3	SK Gaming	703	Steady
4	OpTic Gaming	537	▼2
5	FaZe Clan	456	▲2
6	North	410	Steady
8	Fnatic	395	▲12
9	Natus Vincere	371	Steady
10	Team EnVyUs	355	▼2
12	Gambit Gaming	252	▲4
13	G2 Esports	251	▼2
14	GODSENT	200	Steady
15	mousesports	175	▼3
16	Team Liquid	162	▲1
19	FlipSid3 Tactics	118	Steady
20	HellRaisers	115	▼2

^{†}Change since January 23, 2017 ranking

== Clash for Cash ==
ELEAGUE announced a televised rematch, dubbed the "Clash for Cash", between the two finalists on June 16, 2017. It featured a US$250,000 prize pool for the winner. Despite losing the first map in the best-of-three, Astralis dominated the last two maps and took the match.

Astralis vs. Virtus.pro Scores
Team	Score	Map	Score	Team
Astralis	7	Nuke	16	Virtus.pro
Astralis	16	Overpass	4	Virtus.pro
Astralis	16	Mirage	3	Virtus.pro
