= ESL One Cologne 2016 =

Esports tournament

- 2016
- The ESL One Cologne 2016 logo

Tournament information
- Sport: Counter-Strike: Global Offensive
- Location: Cologne, North Rhine-Westphalia, Germany
- Dates: July 5, 2016–July 10, 2016
- Administrator: Valve; ESL
- Tournament format(s): 16 team double-elimination group stage Eight team single-elimination playoff
- Venue: Lanxess Arena
- Teams: 16 teams
- Purse: $1,000,000 USD

Final positions
- Champions: SK Gaming (1st title)
- 1st runners-up: Team Liquid
- 2nd runners-up: Fnatic; Virtus.pro
- MVP: Marcelo "coldzera" David

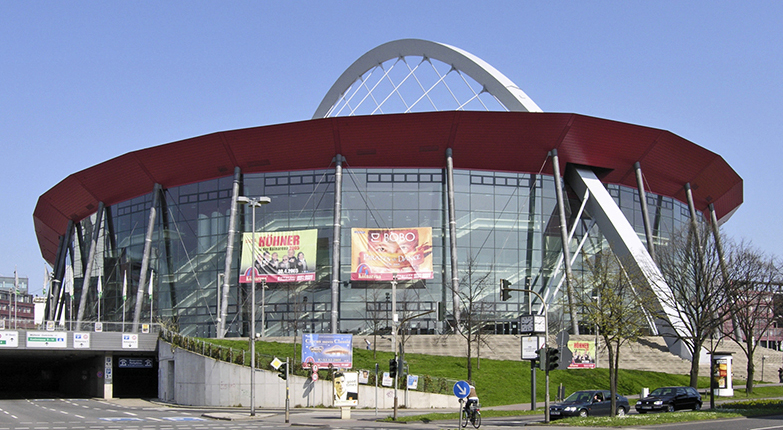
The LANXESS Arena in Cologne, Germany will host the tournament for the second year in a row.

ESL One Cologne 2016, also known as ESL Cologne Major 2016 or Cologne 2016, was an Electronic Sports League Counter-Strike: Global Offensive tournament. It was the ninth Counter-Strike: Global Offensive Major Championship and was held at the Lanxess Arena In Cologne, Germany from July 8–10. It featured 16 teams from throughout the world competing. Cologne 2016 had the second consecutive major with a prize pool of $1,000,000.

The playoffs featured eight teams. Astralis, Fnatic, Gambit Gaming, Natus Vincere, SK Gaming, Team Liquid, and Virtus.pro were returning Legends and FlipSid3 Tactics was the only new Legend. Ninjas in Pyjamas failed to retain its Legends status after eight straight majors of being Legends. The grand finals had SK Gaming, which was the defending champion from the previous major at MLG Major Championship: Columbus, (Note: Although Luminosity Gaming had been the champions of the previous major, SK Gaming acquired their roster in June 2016, thus gaining the organization's Legend's place.) against Team Liquid, which was the first ever North America team to reach the grand finals at a major. SK Gaming defeated FlipSid3 Tactics and Virtus.pro and Team Liquid upset Natus Vincere and Fnatic to reach the finals. In the end, SK Gaming defended its title 2–0 over the underdog Team Liquid and continued to be the only non-European team to win a title until the PGL 2017 Kraków Major Championship, in which Gambit Esports from Kazakhstan won the title. SK Gaming also joined Fnatic to be the only teams to have multiple major titles.

== Format ==
The top eight teams from the MLG Columbus Major ("Legends") were automatically invited to ESL One Cologne 2016. The remaining eight spots were filled by teams that advanced from the ESL One Cologne 2016 Main Qualifier. These 16 teams were then split into four groups, seeded based on results from Columbus 2016 and the Cologne 2016 Main Qualifier. The groups were decided by a random number generator. First the bottom four teams of the qualifier – G2 Esports, Team EnVyUs, Team Dignitas, and FlipSid3 Tactics – were randomly assigned to groups as the fourth seeds. The top four teams of the qualifier – Gambit Gaming, OpTic Gaming, mousesports, and FaZe Clan – were then randomly selected to be the third seeds. The teams that placed fifth through eighth at Columbus 2016 – Fnatic, Virtus.pro, Counter Logic Gaming, and Ninjas in Pyjamas – were randomly assigned the second seeds in the group. Finally, the top four teams from Columbus 2016 – SK Gaming (formerly Luminosity Gaming), Natus Vincere, Astralis, and Team Liquid – were randomly given the top seeds in the four respective groups.

The way that ESL seeded the groups drew some criticism. While Groups A and B combined had three of HLTV's top-10 teams, Group D alone had SK Gaming (#1), G2 Esports (#2), Fnatic (#4), and FaZe (#16). CS:GO analysts called for a more effective seeding method.

All group matches were best-of-ones with the exception of the final decider match, deciding the last playoff spot. The highest seed would play the lowest seed in each group and the second and third seeds would play against each other. The winner of those two matches would play each other to determine which team moved on to the playoff stage, while the losers of the first round of matches also played. The loser of the lower match was then eliminated from the tournament. With one team advanced and one eliminated, the two remaining teams would play a best-of-three elimination match for the second playoff spot. This format is known as the GSL format, named for the Global StarCraft II League.

The playoffs bracket consisted of eight teams, two from each group. All of these matches were best-of-three, single elimination. Teams advanced in the bracket until a winner was decided.

=== Map Pool ===
There were seven maps to choose from. Between Columbus 2016 and Cologne 2016, Inferno was taken out of the active map pool and Nuke was reintroduced after the CSGO development team revamped the map. Before each best-of-one match in the group stage, teams alternated banning maps until five maps had been banned. One of the two remaining maps was randomly selected, and the team that that did not get a third ban then selected which side it wanted to start on. In all best-of-three series, each team first banned a map, leaving a five-map pool. Each team then chose a map, with the opposing team selecting which side they wanted to start on for their opponent's map choice. The two map picks were the first two maps in the best-of-three. If the series were to require a third map, the map was randomly selected from the three remaining maps.

Maps

- Cache
- Cobblestone
- Dust II
- Mirage
- Nuke
- Overpass
- Train

== Main Qualifier ==
=== Regional Qualifiers ===
The final four bracket from each qualifier are shown below; two from each move on to the main qualifying event. All games are offline.

==== Asia Minor ====
The winner and runner-up of Intel Extreme Masters Season X Taipei were invited to the qualifier. In addition, two teams from the Korean qualifier, two teams from the Chinese qualifier, one team from the Southeast Asia qualifier, and one team from the Oceania qualifier will be in the minor.

Asia Minor Bracket; Seoul, South Korea

Teams

- The MongolZ (IEM Taipei #1)
- Renegades (IEM Taipei #2)
- MVP Project (Korea #1)
- m0nster.kr (Korea #2)
- VG.CyberZen (China #1)
- TyLoo (China #2)
- Risky Gaming (SEA #1)
- Team Immunity (Oceania #1)

Upper round 1
A1 | Team Immunity | 0
B2 | Renegades | 2
B1 | TyLoo | 2
A2 | VG.CyberZen | 1
Lower round 1
A1 | Team Immunity | 0
A2 | VG.CyberZen | 2

Upper final
B2 | Renegades | 2
B1 | TyLoo | 0
Lower final
B1 | TyLoo | 2
A2 | VG.CyberZen | 0

Final
B2 | Renegades | 1
B1 | TyLoo | 2

==== Europe Minor ====
The Europe Minor was held by DreamHack in Tours, France. Two qualifiers were held and four teams from each qualifier moved on to the minor.

DreamHack Tours 2016 Bracket; Tours, France

Teams

- HellRaisers (Qualifier #1)
- Lounge Gaming (Qualifier #1)
- SK Gaming (Qualifier #1)
- Team Dignitas (Qualifier #1)
- ENCE eSports (Qualifier #2)
- Epsilon eSports (Qualifier #2)
- GODSENT (Qualifier #2)
- Team Orbit (Qualifier #2)

Upper round 1
A1 | Team Dignitas | 2
B2 | ENCE eSports | 0
B1 | HellRaisers | 0
A2 | Team Orbit | 2
Lower round 1
B2 | ENCE eSports | 0
B1 | HellRaisers | 2

Upper final
A1 | Team Dignitas | 2
A2 | Team Orbit | 1
Lower final
A2 | Team Orbit | 1
B1 | HellRaisers | 2

Final
A1 | Team Dignitas | 2
B1 | HellRaisers | 1

==== CIS Minor ====
In the CIS Minor, four teams were invited and four more teams from the closed qualifier arrived to the minor in Moscow.

CIS Minor Bracket; Moscow, Russia

Teams

- ANOX (Invited)
- Arcade eSports (Invited)
- Team Empire (Invited)
- Worst Players (Invited)
- Binary Dragons Gold (Closed Qualifier)
- Digital Wave (Closed Qualifier)
- FLuffy Gangsters (Closed Qualifier)
- Vesuvius (Closed Qualifier)

Upper round 1
A1 | FLuffy Gangster | 2
B2 | ANOX | 1
B1 | Worst Players | 1
A2 | Team Empire | 2
Lower round 1
B2 | ANOX | 1
B1 | Worst Players | 2

Upper final
A1 | FLuffy Gangster | 1
A2 | Team Empire | 2
Lower final
A1 | FLuffy Gangster | 2
B1 | Worst Players | 0

Final
A2 | Team Empire | 0
A1 | FLuffy Gangster | 2

==== Americas Minor ====
The Americas Minor had four teams invited, three teams from the North American qualifier, and one team from the South American qualifier.

Americas Minor Bracket; Columbus, Ohio, USA

Teams

- NRG Esports (Invited)
- OpTic Gaming (Invited)
- Selfless Gaming (Invited)
- Tempo Storm (Invited)
- Team SoloMid (NA #1–2)
- Winterfox (NA #1–2)
- Team Kaliber (NA #3)
- WinOut.net (SA #1)

Upper round 1
A1 | Tempo Storm | 2
B2 | Selfless Gaming | 0
B1 | OpTic Gaming | 2
A2 | Team SoloMid | 1
Lower round 1
B2 | Selfless Gaming | 0
A2 | Team SoloMid | 2

Upper final
A1 | Tempo Storm | 0
B1 | OpTic Gaming | 2
Lower final
A1 | Tempo Storm | 2
A2 | Team SoloMid | 0

Final
B1 | OpTic Gaming | 2
A1 | Tempo Storm | 1

=== Main Qualifier ===
Like the previous majors, there will be a major qualifier and regional qualifiers. The bottom eight teams from MLG Columbus 2016 received automatic bids to the main qualifier. Two teams each from the Asia, North America, Europe, and CIS Minors will be able to compete in the major qualifier.

Unlike previous qualifiers, this main qualifier will be a sixteen team swiss tournament, where after the Day 1 games, teams will play other teams with the same win–loss record. Every round will consist of one game. In addition, teams will not play the same team twice. Any team with three wins would qualify for the major, and any team with three losses would be eliminated.

First round seeding was determined by the following:

- Teams that placed 9th at the previous major (mousesports, FaZe Clan, Gambit Gaming, G2 Esports) were first seeds
- Teams that placed 13th place at the previous major (FlipSid3 Tactics, Splyce, Team EnVyUs, Cloud9) were second seeds
- Teams that placed first in their regional qualifiers (OpTic Gaming, TyLoo, FLuffy Gangsters, Team Dignitas) were third seeds
- Teams that were runners-up in their regional qualifiers (Immortals, Renegades, Team Empire, HellRaisers) were fourth seeds

In the second round, the winners in the first round will face each other in the "high" matches; the losers will face each other in the "low" matches.

In the third round, the winners of the high matches from round two will face each other. The winners of these two matches will qualify for the major. The losers of the high round and the winners of the low round will face each other in the "mid" matches. The losers from the previous low matches will face each other in round three's low matches. The losers of these low matches are eliminated. Twelve teams remain in the Qualifier.

In the fourth round, the losers of the high matches and the winners of the low matches will face each other in round four's high matches. The winners of the high matches qualify for the major. The losers of the mid matches and the winners of the low matches will face each other in the low matches of round four. The losers of these matches are eliminated from the Qualifier. Six teams remain.

In the last round, the remaining teams will face off. The winners of these matches will qualify for the major and the losing teams will be eliminated.

Columbus 2016 Bottom 8

- mousesports
- FaZe Clan
- Gambit Gaming
- G2 Esports
- FlipSid3 Tactics
- Splyce
- Team EnVyUs
- Cloud9

Regional Qualifiers

- OpTic Gaming (Americas Minor #1)
- Immortals (Americas Minor #2)
- TyLoo (Asia Minor #1)
- Renegades (Asia Minor #2)
- FLuffy Gangsters (CIS Minor #1)
- Team Empire (CIS Minor #2)
- Team Dignitas (Europe Minor #1)
- HellRaisers (Europe Minor #2)

=== Qualifier results ===
Main Qualifier Results

| Place | Team | Record | Differential | Round 1 | Round 2 | Round 3 | Round 4 | Round 5 |
|---|---|---|---|---|---|---|---|---|
| 1–2 | FaZe Clan | 3–0 | +24 | Team Dignitas; 16–8; Mirage | High match FlipSid3 Tactics; 16–5; Cobblestone | High match Gambit Gaming; 16–11; Train | Qualified | Qualified |
| 1–2 | mousesports | 3–0 | +22 | FLuffy Gangsters; 19–17; Dust II | High match Cloud9; 16–12; Mirage | High match G2 Esports; 16–1; Dust II | Qualified | Qualified |
| 3–5 | Team EnVyUs | 3–1 | +20 | Immortals; 16–6; Dust II | High match Gambit Gaming; 10–16; Cobblestone | Mid match Splyce; 16–4; Cobblestone | High match Cloud9; 16–12; Cobblestone | Qualified |
| 3–5 | OpTic Gaming | 3–1 | +16 | Gambit Gaming; 14–16; Cobblestone | Low match FLuffy Gangsters; 16–9; Train | Mid match FlipSid3 Tactics; 16–7; Train | High match HellRaisers; 16–14; Cache | Qualified |
| 3–5 | Gambit Gaming | 3–1 | +9 | OpTic Gaming; 16–14; Cobblestone | High match Team EnVyUs; 16–10; Cobblestone | High match FaZe Clan; 11–16; Train | High match G2 Esports; 16–10; Train | Qualified |
| 6–8 | Team Dignitas | 3–2 | +6 | FaZe Clan; 8–16; Mirage | Low match Team Empire; 16–13; Nuke | Mid match HellRaisers; 10–16; Nuke | Low match Renegades; 16–12; Dust II | TyLoo; 16–3; Cobblestone |
| 6–8 | G2 Esports | 3–2 | +2 | TyLoo; 16–9; Cache | High match HellRaisers; 16–8; Dust II | High match mousesports 1–16; Nuke | High match Gambit Gaming; 10–16; Cache | Cloud9; 16–8; Overpass |
| 6–8 | FlipSid3 Tactics | 3–2 | −2 | Renegades; 16–9; Mirage | High match FaZe Clan; 5–16; Cobblestone | Mid match OpTic Gaming; 7–16; Train | Low match Immortals; 16–12; Train | HellRaisers; 16–9; Overpass |
| 9–11 | HellRaisers | 2–3 | −9 | Splyce; 17–19; Cobblestone | Low match G2 Esports; 11–16; Dust II | Low match Team Dignitas; 16–9; Nuke | Low match OpTic Gaming; 16–8; Cache | FlipSid3 Tactics; 13–16; Overpass |
| 9–11 | Cloud9 | 2–3 | −6 | Team Empire; 16–12; Cobblestone | High match mousesports 12–16; Mirage | Mid match TyLoo; 16–13; Cache | High match Team EnVyUs; 12–16; Cobblestone | G2 Esports; 8–16; Cache |
| 9–11 | TyLoo | 2–3 | −16 | G2 Esports; 9–16; Cache | Low match Immortals; 16–11; Cache | Mid match Cloud9; 13–16; Cache | Low match Splyce; 16–14; Mirage | Team Dignitas; 3–16; Cobblestone |
| 12–14 | Renegades | 1–3 | −8 | FlipSid3 Tactics; 9–16; Mirage | Low match Splyce; 14–16; Cobblestone | Low match FLuffy Gangsters; 11–16; Mirage | Low match Team Dignitas; 12–16; Dust II | Eliminated |
| 12–14 | Immortals | 1–3 | −10 | Team EnVyUs; 6–16; Dust II | Low match TyLoo; 11–16; Cache | Low match Team Empire; 16–7; Cobblestone | Low match FlipSid3 Tactics; 12–16; Train | Eliminated |
| 12–14 | Splyce | 1–3 | −19 | HellRaisers; 9–16; Cobblestone | Low match Renegades; 16–14; Cobblestone | Mid match Team EnVyUs; 4–16; Cobblestone | Low match TyLoo; 14–16; Mirage | Eliminated |
| 15–16 | FLuffy Gangsters | 0–3 | −15 | mousesports 16–19; Dust II | Low match OpTic Gaming; 9–16; Train | Low match Renegades; 11–16; Mirage | Eliminated | Eliminated |
| 15–16 | Team Empire | 0–3 | −16 | Cloud9; 12–16; Cobblestone | Low match Team Dignitas; 13–16; Nuke | Low match Immortals; 7–16; Cobblestone | Eliminated | Eliminated |

== Broadcast talent ==
Stage Hosts

- Paul "ReDeYe" Chaloner
- Alex "Machine" Richardson
- Mitch "Uber" Leslie

Analysts

- Duncan "Thorin" Shields
- Jason "moses" O'Toole
- Janko "YNk" Paunović

Commentators

- Anders Blume
- Auguste "Semmler" Massonnat
- Henry "HenryG" Greer
- Matthew "Sadokist" Trivett
- Daniel "ddk" Kapadia
- James Bardolph
- Lauren "Pansy" Scott
- John "BLU" Mullen

=== Broadcasts ===
All streams were broadcast on Twitch in various languages.

- ESL CSGO
- 99Damage
- CSGOITALIA
- ESL Brazil
- ESL France
- ESL Poland
- ESL Spain
- Magyar Esport TV
- RuHub
- striimIT
- Strimok

== Teams ==
Legends

- SK Gaming (Note: A few months before the Major, SK Gaming and Luminosity Gaming were in a contract dispute in which the Luminosity owner accused SK Gaming of attempting to poach the roster. SK Gaming claimed the Luminosity players, coach, and manager all signed a contract with SK Gaming before they joined Luminosity Gaming. After weeks of conflict, both sides agreed to the contract. Thus, the roster of Luminosity was acquired by SK Gaming prior to the Major.)
- Natus Vincere
- Astralis
- Team Liquid
- Ninjas in Pyjamas
- Virtus.pro
- Fnatic
- Counter Logic Gaming

Challengers

- mousesports
- FaZe Clan
- OpTic Gaming
- FlipSid3 Tactics
- Gambit Gaming
- G2 Esports
- Team Dignitas
- Team EnVyUs

=== Pre-Major ranking ===
The HLTV.org July 4, 2016, ranking, the final one released before ESL One Cologne 2016, is displayed below.

HLTV.org Pre-Major Ranking

World Ranking
| Place | Team | Points | Move^{†} |
|---|---|---|---|
| 1 | SK Gaming | 964 | Steady |
| 2 | G2 Esports | 734 | Steady |
| 3 | Fnatic | 627 | ▲1 |
| 4 | Ninjas in Pyjamas | 596 | ▲1 |
| 5 | Natus Vincere | 596 | ▼2 |
| 6 | Team EnVyUs | 340 | ▲3 |
| 7 | Virtus.pro | 320 | Steady |
| 8 | Astralis | 320 | ▼2 |
| 11 | Team Liquid | 230 | ▼1 |
| 13 | mousesports | 209 | Steady |
| 14 | Team Dignitas | 190 | ▲1 |
| 16 | OpTic Gaming | 188 | ▲1 |
| 17 | FaZe Clan | 161 | ▼1 |
| 20 | Gambit Gaming | 101 | Steady |
| 23 | FlipSid3 Tactics | 84 | ▼2 |
| 26 | Counter Logic Gaming | 65 | ▼4 |

^{†}Change since June 27, 2016, ranking

== Group stage ==
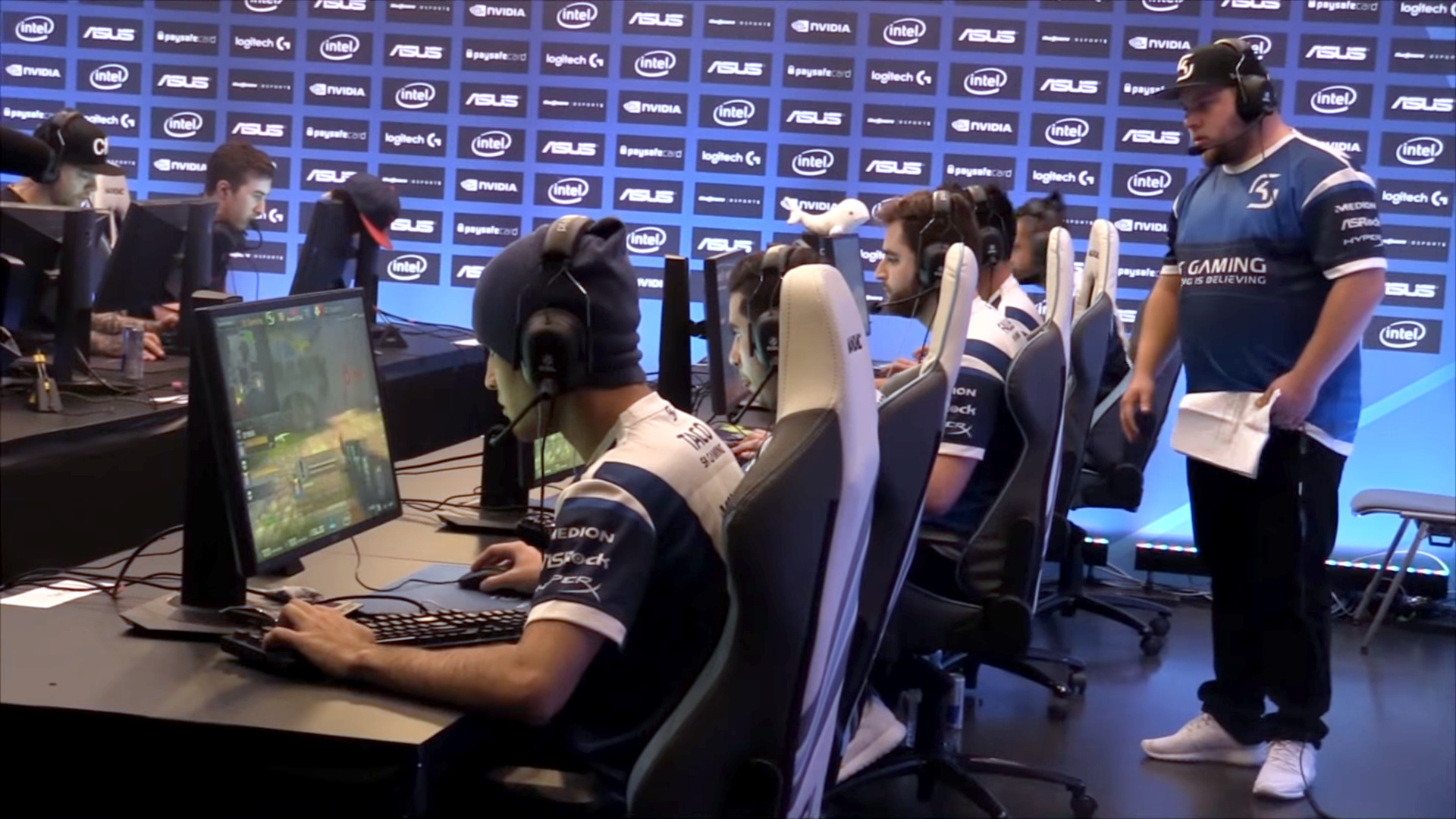
A match between SK Gaming and G2 Esports in the group stage

The four groups were announced on ESL's social media accounts on June 12, 2016.

=== Group A ===
| Pos | Team | W | L | RF | RA | RD | Pts |
|---|---|---|---|---|---|---|---|
| 1 | Gambit Gaming | 2 | 0 | 32 | 19 | +13 | 2 |
| 2 | Astralis | 2 | 1 | 70 | 71 | −1 | 2 |
| 3 | Team Dignitas | 1 | 2 | 71 | 65 | +8 | 1 |
| 4 | Counter Logic Gaming | 0 | 2 | 14 | 32 | −18 | 0 |

Group A Matches
| Astralis | 1 | 0 | Team Dignitas |
| Counter Logic Gaming | 0 | 1 | Gambit Gaming |
| Astralis | 0 | 1 | Gambit Gaming |
| Counter Logic Gaming | 0 | 1 | Team Dignitas |
| Astralis | 2 | 1 | Team Dignitas |

Group A Scores

Group A Scores
| Team | Score | Map | Score | Team |
|---|---|---|---|---|
| Astralis | 16 | Overpass | 12 | Team Dignitas |
| Counter Logic Gaming | 13 | Dust II | 16 | Gambit Gaming |
| Astralis | 6 | Dust II | 16 | Gambit Gaming |
| Counter Logic Gaming | 1 | Cobblestone | 16 | Team Dignitas |
| Astralis | 16 | Cobblestone | 19 | Team Dignitas |
| Astralis | 16 | Mirage | 10 | Team Dignitas |
| Astralis | 16 | Cache | 14 | Team Dignitas |

=== Group B ===
| Pos | Team | W | L | RF | RA | RD | Pts |
|---|---|---|---|---|---|---|---|
| 1 | Natus Vincere | 2 | 0 | 32 | 19 | +13 | 2 |
| 2 | FlipSid3 Tactics | 2 | 1 | 69 | 58 | +11 | 2 |
| 3 | Ninjas in Pyjamas | 1 | 2 | 57 | 66 | −9 | 1 |
| 4 | OpTic Gaming | 0 | 2 | 17 | 32 | −15 | 0 |

Group B Matches
| Natus Vincere | 1 | 0 | FlipSid3 Tactics |
| Ninjas in Pyjamas | 1 | 0 | OpTic Gaming |
| Natus Vincere | 1 | 0 | Ninjas in Pyjamas |
| OpTic Gaming | 0 | 1 | FlipSid3 Tactics |
| Ninjas in Pyjamas | 1 | 2 | FlipSid3 Tactics |

Group B Scores

Group B Scores
| Team | Score | Map | Score | Team |
|---|---|---|---|---|
| Natus Vincere | 16 | Train | 7 | FlipSid3 Tactics |
| Ninjas in Pyjamas | 16 | Dust II | 4 | OpTic Gaming |
| Natus Vincere | 16 | Cobblestone | 12 | Ninjas in Pyjamas |
| OpTic Gaming | 13 | Train | 16 | FlipSid3 Tactics |
| Ninjas in Pyjamas | 16 | Overpass | 14 | FlipSid3 Tactics |
| Ninjas in Pyjamas | 2 | Cache | 16 | FlipSid3 Tactics |
| Ninjas in Pyjamas | 11 | Mirage | 16 | FlipSid3 Tactics |

=== Group C ===
| Pos | Team | W | L | RF | RA | RD | Pts |
|---|---|---|---|---|---|---|---|
| 1 | Virtus.pro | 2 | 0 | 32 | 22 | +10 | 2 |
| 2 | Team Liquid | 2 | 1 | 60 | 40 | +20 | 2 |
| 3 | mousesports | 1 | 2 | 43 | 60 | −17 | 1 |
| 4 | Team EnVyUs | 0 | 2 | 19 | 32 | −13 | 0 |

Group C Matches
| Team Liquid | 1 | 0 | Team EnVyUs |
| Virtus.pro | 1 | 0 | mousesports |
| Team Liquid | 0 | 1 | Virtus.pro |
| mousesports | 1 | 0 | Team EnVyUs |
| Team Liquid | 2 | 0 | mousesports |

Group C Scores

Group C Scores
| Team | Score | Map | Score | Team |
|---|---|---|---|---|
| Team Liquid | 16 | Train | 7 | Team EnVyUs |
| Virtus.pro | 16 | Train | 10 | mousesports |
| Team Liquid | 12 | Cobblestone | 16 | Virtus.pro |
| mousesports | 16 | Train | 12 | Team EnVyUs |
| Team Liquid | 16 | Cobblestone | 11 | mousesports |
| Team Liquid | 16 | Mirage | 6 | mousesports |
| Team Liquid | – | Dust II | – | mousesports |

=== Group D ===
| Pos | Team | W | L | RF | RA | RD | Pts |
|---|---|---|---|---|---|---|---|
| 1 | SK Gaming | 2 | 0 | 32 | 17 | +15 | 2 |
| 2 | Fnatic | 2 | 1 | 62 | 45 | +17 | 2 |
| 3 | FaZe Clan | 1 | 2 | 38 | 62 | −24 | 1 |
| 4 | G2 Esports | 0 | 2 | 24 | 32 | −8 | 0 |

Group D Matches
| SK Gaming | 1 | 0 | G2 Esports |
| Fnatic | 0 | 1 | FaZe Clan |
| SK Gaming | 1 | 0 | FaZe Clan |
| Fnatic | 1 | 0 | G2 Esports |
| FaZe Clan | 0 | 2 | Fnatic |

Group D Scores

Group D Scores
| Team | Score | Map | Score | Team |
|---|---|---|---|---|
| SK Gaming | 16 | Cobblestone | 11 | G2 Esports |
| Fnatic | 14 | Dust II | 16 | FaZe Clan |
| SK Gaming | 16 | Cobblestone | 6 | FaZe Clan |
| Fnatic | 16 | Train | 13 | G2 Esports |
| FaZe Clan | 9 | Cache | 16 | Fnatic |
| FaZe Clan | 7 | Mirage | 16 | Fnatic |
| FaZe Clan | – | Dust II | – | Fnatic |

Also known as the "Group of Death," Group D featured four world class teams in one group, including the top three teams in the world. The matchup of the number 1, number 2, and number 3 teams all in the same group received criticism when a team of a lesser caliber such as Gambit could make it to the playoffs and a top three team would not. CS:GO analyst Duncan "Thorin" Shields called it the hardest group of all time.

== Playoffs ==
=== Bracket ===
Quarterfinals
C1 | Virtus.pro | 2
A2 | Astralis | 0
D1 | SK Gaming | 2
B2 | FlipSid3 Tactics | 0
B1 | Natus Vincere | 1
C2 | Team Liquid | 2
A1 | Gambit Gaming | 0
D2 | Fnatic | 2

Semifinals
C1 | Virtus.pro | 1
B1 | SK Gaming | 2
C2 | Team Liquid | 2
D2 | Fnatic | 0

Finals
B1 | SK Gaming | 2
C2 | Team Liquid | 0

=== Quarterfinals ===
==== Virtus.pro vs. Astralis ====
Casters: moses & Pansy

Virtus.pro vs. Astralis Scores
| Team | Score | Map | Score | Team |
|---|---|---|---|---|
| Virtus.pro | 19 | Overpass | 17 | Astralis |
| Virtus.pro | 19 | Train | 15 | Astralis |
| Virtus.pro | – | Cache | – | Astralis |

==== SK Gaming vs FlipSid3 Tactics ====
Casters: James Bardolph & ddk

SK Gaming vs. FlipSid3 Tactics Scores
| Team | Score | Map | Score | Team |
|---|---|---|---|---|
| SK Gaming | 16 | Mirage | 7 | FlipSid3 Tactics |
| SK Gaming | 19 | Nuke | 17 | FlipSid3 Tactics |
| SK Gaming | – | Train | – | FlipSid3 Tactics |

==== Natus Vincere vs Team Liquid ====
Casters: Sadokist & HenryG

Natus Vincere vs. Team Liquid Scores
| Team | Score | Map | Score | Team |
|---|---|---|---|---|
| Natus Vincere | 16 | Train | 11 | Team Liquid |
| Natus Vincere | 12 | Nuke | 16 | Team Liquid |
| Natus Vincere | 6 | Cobblestone | 16 | Team Liquid |

==== Gambit Gaming vs Fnatic ====
Casters: Anders Blume & Semmler

Gambit Gaming vs. Fnatic Scores
| Team | Score | Map | Score | Team |
|---|---|---|---|---|
| Gambit Gaming | 5 | Train | 16 | Fnatic |
| Gambit Gaming | 3 | Cache | 16 | Fnatic |
| Gambit Gaming | – | Dust II | – | Fnatic |

=== Semifinals ===
==== Virtus.pro vs SK Gaming ====
Casters: Sadokist & HenryG

Virtus.pro vs. SK Gaming Scores
| Team | Score | Map | Score | Team |
|---|---|---|---|---|
| Virtus.pro | 19 | Cobblestone | 17 | SK Gaming |
| Virtus.pro | 5 | Nuke | 16 | SK Gaming |
| Virtus.pro | 12 | Mirage | 16 | SK Gaming |

==== Team Liquid vs. Fnatic ====
Casters: James Bardolph & ddk

Team Liquid vs. Fnatic Scores
| Team | Score | Map | Score | Team |
|---|---|---|---|---|
| Team Liquid | 16 | Cobblestone | 13 | Fnatic |
| Team Liquid | 16 | Cache | 13 | Fnatic |
| Team Liquid | – | Train | – | Fnatic |

=== Finals ===
Casters: Anders Blume, Semmler, & moses

SK Gaming vs. Team Liquid Scores
| Team | Score | Map | Score | Team |
|---|---|---|---|---|
| SK Gaming | 16 | Train | 7 | Team Liquid |
| SK Gaming | 16 | Cobblestone | 6 | Team Liquid |
| SK Gaming | – | Nuke | – | Team Liquid |

== Final standings ==
| Place | Prize Money | Team | Seed | Roster | Coach |
|---|---|---|---|---|---|
| 1st | US$500,000 | SK Gaming | ELEAGUE Major 2017 | FalleN, coldzera, fnx, TACO, fer | zews |
| 2nd | US$150,000 | Team Liquid | ELEAGUE Major 2017 | Hiko, EliGE, jdm64, nitr0, s1mple | peacemaker |
| 3rd – 4th | US$70,000 | Virtus.pro | ELEAGUE Major 2017 | TaZ, NEO, pashaBiceps, Snax, byali | kuben |
| 3rd – 4th | US$70,000 | fnatic | ELEAGUE Major 2017 | flusha, olofmeister, JW, dennis, KRiMZ | vuggo |
| 5th – 8th | US$35,000 | Astralis | ELEAGUE Major 2017 | karrigan, dev1ce, dupreeh, Xyp9x, gla1ve, zonic (Note: Due to dupreeh needing surgery, Astralis coach zonic stood in for the player from July 7 onwards.) | zonic |
| 5th – 8th | US$35,000 | FlipSid3 Tactics | ELEAGUE Major 2017 | B1ad3, markeloff, Shara, WorldEdit, waylander | kane |
| 5th – 8th | US$35,000 | Natus Vincere | ELEAGUE Major 2017 | Zeus, Edward, flamie, seized, GuardiaN | starix |
| 5th – 8th | US$35,000 | Gambit Gaming | ELEAGUE Major 2017 | hooch, Dosia, spaze, mou, AdreN | beAst |
| 9th – 12th | US$8,750 | Team Dignitas | ELEAGUE Major 2017 Qualifiers | cajunb, MSL, k0nfig, tenzki, RUBINO | ruggah |
| 9th – 12th | US$8,750 | Ninjas in Pyjamas | ELEAGUE Major 2017 Qualifiers | GeT_RiGhT, f0rest, Xizt, friberg, pyth | THREAT |
| 9th – 12th | US$8,750 | mousesports | ELEAGUE Major 2017 Qualifiers | nex, denis, Spiidi, chrisJ, NiKo | kassad |
| 9th – 12th | US$8,750 | FaZe Clan | ELEAGUE Major 2017 Qualifiers | fox, rain, jkaem, aizy, kioShiMa | RobbaN |
| 13th – 16th | US$8,750 | Counter Logic Gaming | ELEAGUE Major 2017 Qualifiers | reltuC, hazed, tarik, koosta, pita | pita |
| 13th – 16th | US$8,750 | OpTic Gaming | ELEAGUE Major 2017 Qualifiers | daps, NAF, stanislaw, RUSH, mixwell | – |
| 13th – 16th | US$8,750 | Team EnVyUs | ELEAGUE Major 2017 Qualifiers | NBK-, Happy, kennyS, apEX, DEVIL | Next |
| 13th – 16th | US$8,750 | G2 Esports | ELEAGUE Major 2017 Qualifiers | shox, RPK, bodyy, SmithZz, ScreaM | NiaK |

=== Post-Major Ranking ===
The HLTV.org July 11, 2016 rankings of teams in the major is displayed below. The ranking was the first one released after the ESL One Cologne 2016.

HLTV.org Post-Major Ranking

World Ranking
| Place | Team | Points | Move^{†} |
|---|---|---|---|
| 1 | SK Gaming | 1000 | Steady |
| 2 | Fnatic | 615 | ▲1 |
| 3 | G2 Esports | 530 | ▼1 |
| 4 | Natus Vincere | 509 | ▲1 |
| 5 | Team Liquid | 467 | ▲6 |
| 6 | Ninjas in Pyjamas | 422 | ▼2 |
| 7 | Virtus.pro | 403 | Steady |
| 8 | Astralis | 310 | Steady |
| 9 | Team EnVyUs | 256 | ▼3 |
| 11 | Gambit Gaming | 188 | ▲9 |
| 12 | FlipSid3 Tactics | 184 | ▲11 |
| 15 | mousesports | 179 | ▼2 |
| 16 | FaZe Clan | 175 | ▲1 |
| 18 | Team Dignitas | 168 | ▼4 |
| 19 | OpTic Gaming | 149 | ▼3 |
| 24 | Counter Logic Gaming | 64 | ▲2 |

^{†}Change since July 4, 2016, ranking
