= PGL Major: Kraków 2017 =

Counter-Strike: Global Offensive Major championship

PGL Major 2017
- 2017
- The PGL Major 2017 logo

Tournament information
- Sport: Counter-Strike: Global Offensive
- Location: Kraków, Poland
- Dates: July 16, 2017–July 23, 2017
- Administrator: Valve; PGL
- Tournament format(s): 16 team swiss-system group stage 8 team single-elimination playoff
- Host: PGL
- Venue: Tauron Arena Kraków
- Teams: 16 teams
- Purse: $1,000,000 USD

Final positions
- Champions: Gambit Esports (1st title)
- 1st runners-up: Immortals
- 2nd runners-up: Astralis; Virtus.pro

Tournament statistics
- Attendance: 15,000
- MVP: Dauren "AdreN" Kystaubayev

PGL Major: Kraków 2017, also known as PGL Major 2017 or Kraków 2017, was the eleventh Counter-Strike: Global Offensive Major Championship. It is the first Major organized by the Romanian organization PGL and it was held in Kraków, Poland from July 16 to 23, 2017. It featured sixteen professional CS:GO teams from around the world. Eight teams qualified directly based on their top eight placement in the previous Major, ELEAGUE Major 2017, while another eight teams qualified through the Offline Major Qualifier. The PGL Major was the fourth consecutive major with a prize pool of US$1,000,000.

The playoffs consisted of eight teams. Astralis, Fnatic, Gambit Esports, North, SK Gaming, and Virtus.pro were returning Legends while BIG and Immortals were new Legends. FaZe Clan and Natus Vincere lost their Legends status after failing to advance from the group stage. The grand finals featured two underdogs: Gambit Esports, which defeated Fnatic and Astralis, and Immortals, which defeated BIG and Virtus.pro. The Major concluded with Gambit defeating Immortals 2–1 in a relatively close best-of-three series, marking just the third time a non-European team won a Major (the Brazilian Luminosity/SK roster won two Majors) and the first time an Asian team won a Major.

== Format ==
The format remained the same as the previous Major. The top eight teams from Atlanta 2017 ("Legends") were automatically invited to Kraków 2017. The remaining eight spots were filled by teams that advanced from the PGL Major Krakow 2017 Main Qualifier. The Krakow 2017 Main Qualifier was a 16-team Swiss-system tournament consisting of the bottom eight teams from Atlanta 2017, as well as eight teams promoted from four regional qualifiers. The top eight teams at the Main Qualifier, teams with three wins, then advanced to the Major as the "Challengers".

The group stage of the Major was also a 16-team Swiss-system group stage. The top eight teams at the end of the group stage, teams with three wins, advanced to the playoff stage and became the new Legends. Teams with three losses were eliminated, but earned an invite to the next Major's offline qualifier. All playoff matches were best-of-three, single elimination.

=== Map Pool ===
The map pool was changed for this major. Dust II was taken out of the active map pool and Valve reintroduced Inferno, which had been taken out of the map pool and revamped.

The veto process was also changed for best-of-one games. One team decided whether to veto maps first or second. The team that vetoes first removed two maps. The second team vetoed three maps. The first team then chose one of the two remaining maps. The second team then chose the side it wanted to start on. The best-of-three veto process was unchanged. Each team first banned a map, leaving a five-map pool. Each team then chose a map, with the opposing team selecting which side they wanted to start on for their opponent's map choice. The two map picks were the first two maps in the best-of-three. The teams then each banned one more map, leaving one map remaining for the best-of-three decider if necessary.

Maps

- Cache
- Cobblestone
- Inferno
- Mirage
- Nuke
- Overpass
- Train

== Major qualifier ==
=== Regional qualifiers ===
==== Asia Minor ====
A total of eight teams will compete in the Asia Minor. Two teams will be invited and the other six will qualify in their regional qualifiers. These teams include one team from East Asia, one team from the Middle East, one team from China, one team from Oceania, and two teams from the India & Southeast Asia qualifier.

Teams

- Renegades (Invited)
- TyLoo (Invited)
- Flash Gaming (China)
- The MongolZ (East Asia)
- Team Spotnet (Middle East)
- Team Immunity (Oceanic)
- Signature Gaming (India + SEA)
- 7642 (India + SEA)

Upper round 1
A1	Flash Gaming	0
B2	Team Immunity	2
B1	TyLoo	1
A2	Renegades	2
Lower round 1
A1	Flash Gaming	0
B1	TyLoo	2

Upper final
B2	Team Immunity	1
A2	Renegades	2
Lower final
B2	Team Immunity	0
B1	TyLoo	2

Final
A2	Renegades	2
B1	TyLoo	1

==== CIS Minor ====
A total of eight teams will compete in the Commonwealth of Independent States Minor. The eight teams that participated in this minor all qualified through the closed qualifier. In the closed qualifier, twelve teams are invited and four teams qualify through an online open qualifier. Teams were separated into four groups of four and the top two teams moved on in each group to the closed qualifier. Two teams in the minor qualified for the main qualifier.

Teams

- Spartak Esports (CIS High)
- Team Spirit (CIS High)
- Team Spirit Academy (CIS High)
- Tengri (CIS High)
- Nemiga Gaming (CIS Low)
- pro100 (CIS Low)
- Quantum Bellator Fire (CIS Low)
- Vega Squadron (CIS Low)

Upper round 1
A1	Vega Squadron	2
B2	pro100	0
B1	Q.B. Fire	0
A2	Tengri	2
Lower round 1
B2	pro100	2
B1	Q.B. Fire	0

Upper final
A1	Vega Squadron	1
A2	Tengri	2
Lower final
A1	Vega Squadron	2
B2	pro100	1

Final
A2	Tengri	0
A1	Vega Squadron	2

==== Europe Minor ====
All teams in the European Minor were required to compete in a closed qualifier. In the closed qualifier, 8 teams were invited and 8 other teams qualified through three different open qualifiers. The teams will play in a Swiss system tournament and the top 8 teams move on to the closed qualifier. In the closed qualifier, the teams will be separated into two groups of four teams. Two teams from each group move on to a four team, double elimination playoff bracket. The top three teams advance to the main qualifier.

Teams

- PENTA Sports (1st–2nd)
- Team EnVyUs (1st–2nd)
- BIG (3rd–5th)
- iGame.com (3rd–5th)
- Team LDLC.com (3rd–5th)
- Ballistix Gaming^{1} (6th–8th)
- Team Dignitas (6th–8th)
- Team Kinguin (6th–8th)

^{1}Fnatic Academy will play under the organization Ballistix Gaming just for the European Minor due to two teams not being allowed under the same organization.

Upper round 1
A1	BIG	0
B2	Team Dignitas	2
B1	PENTA Sports	2
A2	Team EnVyUs	1
Lower round 1
A1	BIG	2
A2	Team EnVyUs	0

Upper final
B2	Team Dignitas	1
B1	PENTA Sports	2
Lower final
B2	Team Dignitas	0
A1	BIG	2

Final
B1	PENTA Sports	0
A1	BIG	2

==== Americas Minor ====
Two teams were invited to the Americas minor. One team out of a pool of 512 from South America qualified for the minor. The last five teams came from the North American closed qualifier. In that closed qualifier, 8 teams qualified through the open qualifier and 8 more teams were invited. The top five teams moved on to the Americas minor. In the minor, two teams moved on to the major.

Teams

- Cloud9 (Invited)
- Immortals (Invited)
- Misfits (North America 1st–2nd)
- NRG Esports (North America 1st–2nd)
- compLexity Gaming (North America 3rd–5th)
- Counter Logic Gaming (North America 3rd–5th)
- Luminosity Gaming (North America 3rd–5th)
- paiN Gaming (South America 1st)

Upper round 1
A1	Immortals	2
B2	Counter Logic G.	0
B1	Cloud9	2
A2	Luminosity G.	0
Lower round 1
B2	Counter Logic	2
A2	Luminosity G.	0

Upper final
A1	Immortals	2
B1	Cloud9	0
Lower final
B1	Cloud9	2
B2	Counter Logic G.	0

Final
A1	Immortals	1
B1	Cloud9	2

=== Main Qualifier ===
==== Teams ====
Atlanta 2017 Bottom 8 (Note: Team EnVyUs lost its automatic bid after three players, kennyS, apEX, and NBK, transferred to G2 Esports. Thus, G2 acquired EnVyUs's spot and EnVyUs had to play in the regional qualifier.)

- GODSENT
- Team Liquid
- mousesports
- OpTic Gaming
- G2 Esports
- FlipSid3 Tactics
- HellRaisers

Regional Qualifiers

- Renegades (Asia Minor #1)
- TyLoo (Asia Minor #2)
- Vega Squadron (CIS Minor #1)
- Tengri (CIS Minor #2)
- Cloud9 (Americas Minor #1)
- Immortals (Americas Minor #2)
- BIG (Europe Minor #1)
- PENTA Sports (Europe Minor #2)
- Team Dignitas (Europe Minor #3)

The main qualifier was a sixteen-team Swiss-system tournament format in which, after the first round, teams only played other teams with the same win–loss record. Each match was best-of-one, and no team played another team twice. All teams played until they had either won or lost three games: any team with three wins advanced to the playoff stage, and any team with three losses was eliminated. The qualifier was played in Bucharest, Romania.

The Ninjas in Pyjamas, after missing its first ever major at ELEAGUE and failed to be Legends for the first time at ESL One Cologne 2016, failed to qualify for the major qualifier and the European Minor after losing to Finland's iGame.com in the first round, losing to Sweden's Red Reserve in second round, defeating Sweden's Epsilon eSports in the third round, and losing to Turkey's Space Soldiers in the fourth round, failing to attend its second straight major.

Main Qualifier Results

Place	Team	Record	Differential	Round 1	Round 2	Round 3	Round 4	Round 5
1–2	mousesports	3–0	+21	Tengri; 16–1; Inferno	High match GODSENT; 16–11; Train	High match PENTA Sports; 16–14; Cobblestone	Qualified	Qualified
1–2	G2 Esports	3–0	+10	Immortals; 22–20; Inferno	High match Cloud9; 16–11; Cache	High match FlipSid3 Tactics; 16–13; Nuke	Qualified	Qualified
3–5	PENTA Sports	3–1	+21	OpTic Gaming; 16–14; Train	High match Team Liquid; 16–3; Mirage	High match mousesports 14–16; Cobblestone	High match Vega Squadron; 16–8; Train	Qualified
3–5	Cloud9	3–1	+19	BIG; 16–10; Cobblestone	High match G2 Esports; 11–16; Cache	Mid match GODSENT; 16–11; Train	High match FlipSid3 Tactics; 16–3; Mirage	Qualified
3–5	BIG	3–1	+9	Cloud9; 10–16; Cobblestone	Low match Tengri; 16–14; Cobblestone	Mid match Immortals; 16–19; Cache	High match Team Liquid; 16–10; Train	Qualified
6–8	Vega Squadron	3–2	+9	HellRaisers; 10–16; Mirage	Low match OpTic Gaming; 16–10; Train	Mid match TyLoo; 16–10; Inferno	High match PENTA Sports; 8–16; Train	Team Dignitas; 16–5; Inferno
6–8	FlipSid3 Tactics	3–2	+1	Renegades; 19–16; Train	High match HellRaisers; 16–4; Overpass	High match G2 Esports; 13–16; Nuke	High match Cloud9; 3–16; Mirage	Team Liquid; 25–23; Mirage
6–8	Immortals	3–2	−1	G2 Esports; 20–22; Inferno	Low match Team Dignitas; 16–13; Cache	Mid match BIG; 9–16; Cache	Low match GODSENT; 16–14; Cobblestone	HellRaisers; 16–13; Overpass
9–11	Team Liquid	2–3	−4	TyLoo; 22–19; Inferno	High match PENTA Sports; 3–16; Mirage	Mid match HellRaisers; 16–2; Train	High match BIG; 10–16; Train	FlipSid3 Tactics; 23–25; Mirage
9–11	Team Dignitas	2–3	−5	GODSENT; 14–16; Overpass	Low match Immortals; 13–16; Cache	Low match Tengri; 16–7; Mirage	Low match Renegades; 16–14; Mirage	Vega Squadron; 5–16; Inferno
9–11	HellRaisers	2–3	−17	Vega Squadron; 16–10; Mirage	High match FlipSid3 Tactics; 4–16; Overpass	Mid match Team Liquid; 2–16; Train	Low match TyLoo; 16–11; Overpass	Immortals; 13–16; Overpass
12–14	Renegades	1–3	−1	FlipSid3 Tactics; 16–19; Train	Low match TyLoo; 14–16; Cache	Low match OpTic Gaming; 16–10; Mirage	Low match Team Dignitas; 14–16; Mirage	Eliminated
12–14	GODSENT	1–3	−10	Team Dignitas; 16–14; Overpass	High match mousesports 11–16; Train	Mid match Cloud9; 11–16; Train	Low match Immortals; 14–16; Cobblestone	Eliminated
12–14	TyLoo	1–3	−12	Team Liquid; 19–22; Inferno	Low match Renegades; 16–14; Cache	Mid match Vega Squadron; 10–16; Inferno	Low match HellRaisers; 11–16; Overpass	Eliminated
15–16	OpTic Gaming	0–3	−14	PENTA Sports; 14–16; Train	Low match Vega Squadron; 10–16; Train	Low match Renegades; 10–16; Mirage	Eliminated	Eliminated
15–16	Tengri	0–3	−26	mousesports 1–16; Inferno	Low match BIG; 14–16; Cobblestone	Low match Team Dignitas; 7–16; Mirage	Eliminated	Eliminated

== Broadcast talent ==
Host

- Paul "ReDeYe" Chaloner

Interviewer

- Scott "SirScoots" Smith

Fluff

- Pala "Mantrousse" Gilroy Sen

Commentators

- James Bardolph
- Anders Blume
- Henry "HenryG" Greer
- Daniel "ddk" Kapadia
- Auguste "Semmler" Massonnat
- Matthew "Sadokist" Trivett

Analysts

- Chad "SPUNJ" Burchill
- Robin "Fifflaren" Johansson
- Joona "natu" Leppänen
- Jason "moses" O'Toole
- Janko "YNk" Paunović

Observers

- Heather "sapphiRe" Garozzo
- DJ "Prius" Kuntz

=== Broadcasts ===
All streams were broadcast on Twitch in various languages.

- PGL TV
- IzakOOO
- 500Bros
- 99Damage
- BiDa
- Fragbite
- HitpointCZ
- ImbaTV
- Moreira
- Ogaming TV
- SpilerTV
- Starladder

== Teams competing ==
The top eight teams from ELEAGUE Major 2017 (Legends) were joined by the eight teams from the main qualifier (Challengers).

Legends

- Astralis
- Virtus.pro
- SK Gaming
- Fnatic
- Natus Vincere
- Gambit Esports
- North
- FaZe Clan

Challengers

- mousesports
- G2 Esports
- PENTA Sports
- Cloud9
- BIG
- Immortals
- Vega Squadron
- Flipsid3 Tactics

Arguably the biggest change of the teams in the major was the "French shuffle," which was led by Nathan "NBK-" Schmitt and Richard "shox" Papillon. NBK-. Kenny "kennyS" Schrub and, Dan "apEX" Madesclaire left Team EnVyUs for G2 Esports to join shox and Alexandre "bodyy" Pianaro; in addition, former G2 AWPer Édouard "SmithZz" Dubourdeaux moved to the coaching position. The remaining two G2 players, Cédric "RpK" Guipouy and Adil "ScreaM" Benrlitom, left the team and joined Team EnVyUs.

=== Pre-major ranking ===
HLTV.org rank teams based on results of teams' performances. The rankings shown below reflect the July 10, 2017 rankings, the last before the Major.

HLTV.org Pre-Major Ranking

World ranking
Place	Team	Points	Move^{1}	Peak^{2}	Low^{2}
1	SK Gaming	1000	Steady	1	4
2	FaZe Clan	623	Steady	2	9
3	Astralis	518	Steady	1	3
4	G2 Esports	474	Steady	4	16
5	Cloud9	427	▲1	5	14
6	Natus Vincere	295	▲4	4	10
7	North	294	▼2	4	8
10	Immortals	225	▼2	7	27
11	Fnatic	209	▼4	6	14
12	mousesports	200	Steady	12	17
14	Virtus.pro	181	▼3	2	15
15	Gambit Esports	177	▼1	7	15
17	BIG	127	▲1	17	27
20	PENTA Sports	106	▼1	19	52
23	Flipsid3 Tactics	76	▼1	16	53
24	Vega Squadron	74	▼3	21	56

^{1}Change since July 3, 2017 ranking

^{2}Peak and low since end of ELEAGUE Major.

== Group stage ==
The group stage was a sixteen-team Swiss-system tournament in which, after the first round, teams only played other teams with the same win–loss record. Each match was best-of-one, and no team played another team twice. All teams played until they had either won or lost three games: any team with three wins advanced to the playoff stage, and any team with three losses was eliminated. The group stage and playoffs were played in Kraków, Poland, with group stage played in closed studio and playoffs being held in Tauron Arena Kraków.

First round seeding was determined by the following:

- Teams that placed top four at the previous Major (Astralis, Virtus.pro, Fnatic, and SK Gaming) were first seeds
- Teams that placed 5th–8th place at the previous Major (Natus Vincere, Gambit Esports, FaZe Clan, and North) were second seeds
- Teams that placed first in the main qualifier (mousesports and G2 Esports) and the top two teams that placed third based on their seeds going into the major qualifier (BIG and Cloud9) were third seeds
- The remaining teams (Immortals, FlipSid3 Tactics, PENTA Sports, and Vega Squadron) were fourth seeds

In the first round, first seeds played a randomly drawn fourth seed, and second seeds played a randomly drawn third seed. After this round, teams were randomly drawn against other teams with the same record (e.g., 1–0 teams against 1–0 teams, 0–1 teams against 0–1 teams). The eight teams to win three (out of a possible five) games were granted "Legend" status and an automatic invitation to the next Major.

Place	Team	Record	Differential	Round 1	Round 2	Round 3	Round 4	Round 5
1–2	Gambit Esports	3–0	+21	mousesports 16–10; Inferno	High match G2 Esports; 16–6; Cache	High match Virtus.pro; 16–11; Train	Playoffs	Playoffs
1–2	BIG	3–0	+15	FaZe Clan; 16–8; Inferno	High match Cloud9; 16–11; Inferno	High match SK Gaming; 16–14; Inferno	Playoffs	Playoffs
3–5	SK Gaming	3–1	+16	PENTA Sports; 16–13; Inferno	High match Astralis; 16–8; Inferno	High match BIG; 14–16; Inferno	High match Immortals; 16–9; Overpass	Playoffs
3–5	North	3–1	+9	Cloud9; 12–16; Mirage	Low match PENTA Sports; 16–9; Mirage	Mid match mousesports 19–15; Cobblestone	High match Virtus.pro; 16–14; Mirage	Playoffs
3–5	Astralis	3–1	+6	Immortals; 19–17; Overpass	High match SK Gaming; 8–16; Inferno	Mid match Fnatic; 16–14; Nuke	High match G2 Esports; 16–6; Inferno	Playoffs
6–8	Virtus.pro	3–2	+18	Vega Squadron; 16–2; Nuke	High match Fnatic; 16–11; Cache	High match Gambit Esports; 11–16; Train	High match North; 14–16; Mirage	Cloud9; 16–10; Train
6–8	Immortals	3–2	+17	Astralis; 17–19; Overpass	Low match Vega Squadron; 16–6; Train	Mid match Natus Vincere; 16–10; Overpass	High match SK Gaming; 9–16; Overpass	FlipSid3 Tactics; 16–6; Train
6–8	Fnatic	3–2	+7	FlipSid3 Tactics; 16–12; Mirage	High match Virtus.pro; 11–16; Cache	Mid match Astralis; 14–16; Nuke	Low match Natus Vincere; 16–12; Mirage	G2 Esports; 16–10; Overpass
9–11	Cloud9	2–3	−4	North; 16–12; Mirage	High match BIG; 11–16; Inferno	Mid match G2 Esports; 17–19; Cobblestone	Low match mousesports 16–11; Train	Virtus.pro; 10–16; Train
9–11	FlipSid3 Tactics	2–3	−12	Fnatic; 12–16; Mirage	Low match Natus Vincere; 9–16; Train	Low match FaZe Clan; 16–10; Mirage	Low match PENTA Sports; 16–13; Train	Immortals; 6–16; Train
9–11	G2 Esports	2–3	−22	Natus Vincere; 16–14; Overpass	High match Gambit Esports; 6–16; Cache	Mid match Cloud9; 19–17; Cobblestone	High match Astralis; 6–16; Inferno	Fnatic; 10–16; Overpass
12–14	Natus Vincere	1–3	−5	G2 Esports; 14–16; Overpass	Low match FlipSid3 Tactics; 16–9; Train	Mid match Immortals; 10–16; Overpass	Low match Fnatic; 12–16; Mirage	Eliminated
12–14	PENTA Sports	1–3	−11	SK Gaming; 13–16; Inferno	Low match North; 9–16; Mirage	Low match Vega Squadron; 16–14; Mirage	Low match FlipSid3 Tactics; 13–16; Train	Eliminated
12–14	mousesports	1–3	−11	Gambit Esports; 10–16; Inferno	Low match FaZe Clan; 19–15; Train	Mid match North; 15–19; Cobblestone	Low match Cloud9; 11–16; Train	Eliminated
15–16	FaZe Clan	0–3	−18	BIG; 8–16; Inferno	Low match mousesports 15–19; Train	Low match FlipSid3 Tactics; 10–16; Mirage	Eliminated	Eliminated
15–16	Vega Squadron	0–3	−26	Virtus.pro; 2–16; Nuke	Low match Immortals; 6–16; Train	Low match PENTA Sports; 14–16; Mirage	Eliminated	Eliminated

== Playoffs ==
=== Bracket ===
BIG and Gambit received the top seeds and played a randomly selected opponent among Virtus.pro, Immortals, and Fnatic. BIG received Immortals and Gambit received Fnatic. Among SK Gaming, North, and Astralis, two randomly selected teams from this pool would go on to face each other and the teams would be SK Gaming and Astralis. The remaining two teams, North and Virtus.pro, were paired together.

Quarterfinals
1	Gambit Esports	16	16	–	2
8	Fnatic	14	12	–	0
5	Astralis	16	16	–	2
3	SK Gaming	12	6	–	0
2	BIG Clan	19	7	14	1
7	Immortals	17	16	16	2
4	North	9	10	–	0
6	Virtus.pro	16	16	–	2

Semifinals
1	Gambit Esports	16	8	16	2
5	Astralis	10	16	12	1
7	Immortals	16	16	–	2
6	Virtus.pro	5	11	–	0

Finals
1	Gambit Esports	4	16	16	2
7	Immortals	16	11	10	1

=== Quarterfinals ===
==== Gambit Esports vs. Fnatic ====
Casters: James Bardolph & ddk

Gambit Esports vs. Fnatic Scores
Team	Score	Map	Score	Team
Gambit Esports	16	Train	14	Fnatic
Gambit Esports	16	Inferno	12	Fnatic
Gambit Esports	–	Overpass	–	Fnatic

==== SK Gaming vs. Astralis ====
Casters: Anders Blume & Semmler

SK Gaming vs. Astralis Scores
Team	Score	Map	Score	Team
SK Gaming	12	Cache	16	Astralis
SK Gaming	6	Overpass	16	Astralis
SK Gaming	–	Mirage	–	Astralis

==== BIG vs. Immortals ====
Casters: HenryG & Sadokist

BIG vs. Immortals Scores
Team	Score	Map	Score	Team
BIG	19	Cobblestone	17	Immortals
BIG	7	Inferno	16	Immortals
BIG	14	Train	16	Immortals

==== North vs. Virtus.pro ====
Casters: Anders Blume & Semmler

North vs. Virtus.pro Scores
Team	Score	Map	Score	Team
North	9	Cobblestone	16	Virtus.pro
North	10	Nuke	16	Virtus.pro
North	–	Mirage	–	Virtus.pro

=== Semifinals ===
==== Gambit Esports vs. Astralis ====
Casters: James Bardolph & ddk

Gambit Esports vs. Astralis Scores
Team	Score	Map	Score	Team
Gambit Esports	16	Overpass	10	Astralis
Gambit Esports	8	Inferno	16	Astralis
Gambit Esports	16	Train	12	Astralis

==== Immortals vs. Virtus.pro ====
Casters: Sadokist & HenryG

Immortals vs. Virtus.pro Scores
Team	Score	Map	Score	Team
Immortals	16	Inferno	5	Virtus.pro
Immortals	16	Mirage	11	Virtus.pro
Immortals	–	Cobblestone	–	Virtus.pro

=== Finals ===
Casters: Sadokist & HenryG

AdreN was named the MVP of the tournament.

Gambit Esports vs. Immortals Scores
Team	Score	Map	Score	Team
Gambit Esports	4	Cobblestone	16	Immortals
Gambit Esports	16	Train	11	Immortals
Gambit Esports	16	Inferno	10	Immortals

== Final standings ==
The final placings are shown below. Each team's in-game leader is shown first.

Place	Prize Money	Team	Seed	Roster	Coach
1st	US$500,000	Gambit Esports	Boston 2018 Legends	Zeus, AdreN, HObbit, mou, Dosia	kane
2nd	US$150,000	Immortals	Boston 2018 Legends	boltz, HEN1, kNg, LUCAS1, steel	zakk
3rd – 4th	US$70,000	Astralis	Boston 2018 Legends	gla1ve, dev1ce, dupreeh, Kjaerbye, Xyp9x	zonic
3rd – 4th	US$70,000	Virtus.pro	Boston 2018 Legends	Snax, byali, NEO, pashaBiceps, TaZ	kuben
5th – 8th	US$35,000	Fnatic	Boston 2018 Legends	flusha, dennis, JW, KRiMZ, olofmeister	Jumpy
5th – 8th	US$35,000	SK Gaming	Boston 2018 Legends	FalleN, coldzera, felps, fer, TACO	–
5th – 8th	US$35,000	BIG	Boston 2018 Legends	gob b, keev, nex, tabseN, LEGIJA	kakafu
5th – 8th	US$35,000	North	Boston 2018 Legends	MSL, aizy, cajunb, k0nfig, Magisk	ruggah
9th – 11th	US$8,750	Cloud9	Boston 2018 New Challengers	Stewie2K, autimatic, n0thing, Skadoodle, shroud	valens
9th – 11th	US$8,750	Flipsid3 Tactics	Boston 2018 New Challengers	B1ad3, electronic, markeloff, wayLander, WorldEdit	–
9th – 11th	US$8,750	G2 Esports	Boston 2018 New Challengers	shox, apEX, bodyy, kennyS, NBK-	SmithZz
12th – 14th	US$8,750	Natus Vincere	Boston 2018 New Challengers	seized, Edward, flamie, GuardiaN, s1mple	Andi
12th – 14th	US$8,750	mousesports	Boston 2018 New Challengers	chrisJ, denis, loWel, oskar, ropz	lmbt
12th – 14th	US$8,750	PENTA Sports	Boston 2018 New Challengers	kRYSTAL, HS, innocent, suNny, zehN	–
15th – 16th	US$8,750	FaZe Clan	Boston 2018 New Challengers	karrigan, allu, kioShiMa, NiKo, rain	RobbaN
15th – 16th	US$8,750	Vega Squadron	Boston 2018 New Challengers	jR, chopper, hutji, keshandr, mir	Lk-

=== Post-Major Ranking ===
The first HLTV.org ranking after the PGL Major came out on July 24, 2017.

HLTV.org Post-Major Ranking

World Ranking
Place	Team	Points	Move^{†}
1	SK Gaming	1000	Steady
2	Astralis	607	▲1
3	FaZe Clan	524	▼1
4	Gambit Esports	505	▲10
5	G2 Esports	463	▼1
6	Immortals	411	▲5
7	Cloud9	396	▼2
8	North	349	▼2
9	Virtus.pro	309	▲6
10	Natus Vincere	277	▼3
11	Fnatic	262	▲2
14	BIG	266	▲3
15	mousesports	221	▼3
20	PENTA Sports	111	▲1
21	Flipsid3 Tactics	111	▲4
24	Vega Squadron	72	Steady

^{†}Change since July 17, 2017 ranking
