= MLG Major Championship: Columbus =

2016 video game tournament held in Columbus, Ohio, US

MLG Counter-Strike: Global Offensive Major Championship: Columbus
- 2016
- The MLG Major 2016 logo

Tournament information
- Sport: Counter-Strike: Global Offensive
- Location: Columbus, Ohio, US
- Dates: March 29, 2016–April 3, 2016
- Administrator: Valve; Major League Gaming
- Venue: Nationwide Arena
- Purse: US$1,000,000

Final positions
- Champions: Luminosity Gaming (1st title)
- 1st runners-up: Natus Vincere
- 2nd runners-up: Astralis; Team Liquid

Tournament statistics
- Matches played: 27
- MVP: Marcelo "coldzera" David

MLG Counter-Strike: Global Offensive Major Championship: Columbus, also referred to as MLG Columbus 2016, was the eighth Counter-Strike: Global Offensive (CS:GO) Major Championship held by Major League Gaming (MLG) throughout March 29 to April 3, 2016, in the Nationwide Arena in Columbus, Ohio, United States. It was the first CS:GO Major in North America as well as the first run by Major League Gaming, who previously ran an exhibition CS:GO tournament at X Games Aspen 2015. It was also the very first CS:GO major in which ESL or DreamHack was not the organizer. It was announced on February 23, 2016, that MLG Columbus 2016 would be the first Counter-Strike tournament with a $1,000,000 prize pool.

The playoffs had eight teams. Astralis, Fnatic, Luminosity Gaming, Natus Vincere, Ninjas in Pyjamas, and Virtus.pro were returning Legends. Counter Logic Gaming and Team Liquid were new Legends as FaZe Clan and Team EnVyUs had their Legends status taken away after failing to make the top eight. In the grand finals, Luminosity Gaming, which defeated Virtus.pro and Team Liquid, faced off against Natus Vincere, which defeated Ninjas in Pyjamas and Astralis. Luminosity Gaming won 2–0 as the underdog for its first major title and fifty percent of the $1,000,000 prize pool; in addition, it became the first non-European team to win a major title.

== Format ==
The top eight finishers at DreamHack Open Cluj-Napoca 2015 ("Legends") received direct invitations to Columbus. In addition, eight other teams ("Challengers") emerged from the MLG Columbus 2016 Main Qualifier.

Teams were split up into four groups, and all group matches were best-of-ones with the exception of the final decider match, deciding the last playoff spot. The highest seed would play the lowest seed in each group and the second and third seeds would play against each other. The winner of those two matches would play each other to determine which team moved on to the playoff stage, while the losers of the first round of matches also played. The loser of the lower match was then eliminated from the tournament. With one team advanced and one eliminated, the two remaining teams would play a best-of-three elimination match for the second playoff spot. This format is known as the GSL format, named for the Global StarCraft II League.

The playoffs bracket consisted of eight teams, two from each group. All of these matches were best-of-three, single elimination. Teams advanced in the bracket until a winner was decided.

=== Map pool ===
The seven-map pool did not change from Cluj-Napoca 2015. Before each best-of-one match in the group stage, teams alternated banning maps until five maps had been banned. One of the two remaining maps was randomly selected, and the team that that did not get a third ban then selected which side it wanted to start on. In all best-of-three series, each team first banned a map, leaving a five-map pool. Each team then chose a map, with the opposing team selecting which side they wanted to start on for their opponent's map choice. The two map picks were the first two maps in the best-of-three. If the series were to require a third map, the map was randomly selected from the three remaining maps.

Maps

- Cache
- Cobblestone
- Dust II
- Inferno
- Mirage
- Overpass
- Train

== Main Qualifier ==
=== Regional qualifiers ===
There were four regional qualifiers and two last chance qualifiers. The top four teams from each qualifier are shown.

The top team from the Americas, Europe, and CIS qualifiers advanced to the main qualifier and the second to fourth place teams played in their respective Last Chance Qualifiers. The top two Asian teams, which played and Intel Extreme Masters Season X Taipei, advanced to the main qualifier. One team from the Americas Last Chance and two teams from the Europe Last Chance will move on to the main qualifier. There was no Last Chance Qualifier for the Asia region.

The main regional qualifiers were played on LAN while the last chance qualifiers were played online.

==== Americas Minor ====
Two teams were invited while another six qualified in the North American qualifier. However, compLexity Gaming could not get a full roster in time, so the team was forced to drop out and the event ran with seven teams. The winner of the Americas Minor would earn a spot in the major qualifier while the three teams that made the bracket stage earned spots in the Americas Last Chance qualifier.

Americas Minor; Columbus, Ohio

Teams

- compLexity Gaming (Invited)
- OpTic Gaming (Invited)
- Enemy (NA Qualifier)
- EZG eSports (NA Qualifier)
- Leader-1 eSports (NA Qualifier)
- Obey Alliance (NA Qualifier)
- Splyce (NA Qualifier)
- Winterfox (NA Qualifier)

Semifinals
Enemy	2
Winterfox	0
OpTic Gaming	1
Splyce	2

Finals
Enemy	2
Splyce	0

==== Asia Minor ====
The Asia qualifier took place at Intel Extreme Masters Season X – Taipei in Taiwan. Two teams were invited and six other teams qualified from their respective regions. TyLoo was disqualified from the event just hours before the tournament was about to start as one of its players, Quanqing "qz" Wu, was found to have been banned for cheating three years prior, which induces an automatic and permanent ban from all Valve-sponsored events. Two teams would earn spots in the major qualifier.

IEM Season X Taipei; Taipei, Taiwan

Teams

- CyberZen (Invited)
- Renegades (Invited)
- Chiefs eSports Club (Oceania)
- Eat You Alive (Taiwan)
- MVP Karnal (Southeast Asia)
- Risky Gaming (India+West Asia)
- The MongolZ (East Asia)
- TyLoo (China)

Semifinals
CyberZen	0
Renegades	2
The MongolZ	2
Chiefs eSports Club	1

Finals
Renegades	0
The MongolZ	2

==== CIS Minor ====
The CIS qualifier had three teams invited, four teams from a closed qualifier, and one team from a Last Chance qualifier. One team would earn a spot in the major qualifier while the other three teams that made the bracket stage would earn spots in the CIS and Europe Last Chance qualifier.

CIS Minor; Minsk, Belarus

Teams

- Arcade eSports (Invited)
- Method (Invited)
- Rebels (Invited)
- Binary Dragons (Closed Qualifier)
- eXplosive (Closed Qualifier)
- Gambit Gaming (Closed Qualifier)
- FLuffy Gangsters (Closed Qualifier)
- Team Quest (Last Chance)

Semifinals
Arcade eSports	1
Rebels	2
Gambit Gaming	2
Method	1

Finals
Rebels	0
Gambit Gaming	2

==== Europe Minor ====
The European qualifier eight teams. Four qualifiers to the European qualifier were held and two teams from each qualified for a chance at the major. One team would earn a spot in the major qualifier while the other three teams that made the bracket stage would earn spots in the CIS and Europe Last Chance qualifier.

Europe Minor; Bucharest, Romania

Teams

- Cringe Gods (Qualifier #1)
- Team LDLC.com White (Qualifier #1)
- E-Frag.net Esports Club (Qualifier #2)
- PENTA Sports (Qualifier #2)
- DenDD (Qualifier #3)
- Lemondogs (Qualifier #3)
- HellRaisers (Qualifier #4)
- PixelFire Gaming (Qualifier #4)

Semifinals
HellRaisers	2
PENTA Sports	1
E-Frag.net Esports Club	2
PixelFire Gaming	1

Finals
HellRaisers	2
E-Frag.net Esports Club	1

==== Americas Last Chance Qualifier ====
In this Last Chance Qualifier, four teams were invited and the three runners-up from the American qualifier were invited. Only one team would earn a spot in the major qualifier.

Americas Last Chance

Teams

- Games Academy (Invited)
- NRG eSports (Invited)
- Team SoloMid (Invited)
- Torqued (Invited)
- Splyce (Americas #2)
- OpTic Gaming (Americas #3–4)
- Winterfox (Americas #3–4)

Semifinals
Splyce	0
Games Academy	2
OpTic Gaming	1
Winterfox	2

Finals
Games Academy	2
Winterfox	1

==== Europe and CIS Last Chance Qualifier ====
Five teams were invited to the Europe and CIS Last Chance Qualifier and the three runners-up from both the Europe and CIS qualifiers were invited. Two teams would earn spots in the major qualifier.

Europe & CIS Last Chance

Teams

- ENCE eSports (Invited)
- Lounge Gaming (Invited)
- SK Gaming (Invited)
- Team Ancient (Invited)
- Team YP (Invited)
- E-Frag.net Esports Club (Europe #2)
- PENTA Sports (Europe #3–4)
- PixelFire Gaming (Europe 3–4)
- Team Empire (CIS #2)
- Arcade eSports (CIS #3–4)
- Method (CIS 3–4)

Semifinals
Team YP	2
Team Ancient	0
SK Gaming	2
ENCE eSports	0

Finals
Team YP	Q
SK Gaming	Q

=== Major qualifier ===
Like the previous majors, there will be a major qualifier and regional qualifiers. The bottom eight teams from DreamHack Open Cluj-Napoca 2015 received automatic bids to the main qualifier. The other eight teams came from various qualifiers.

Teams were divided into four groups and the top two from each group made it to the major.

DH Cluj-Napoca 2015 Bottom 8

- Cloud9
- mousesports
- G2 Esports
- Counter Logic Gaming
- Vexed Gaming
- FlipSid3 Tactics
- Team Liquid
- Team Dignitas

Regional Qualifiers

- Selfless Gaming (Note: The contracts for Enemy's players expired, and the players then become known as Selfless Gaming.) (Americas Minor #1)
- Splyce (Note: The MongolZ had initially qualified as the first seed from the Intel Extreme Masters Season X Taipei tournament, but could not attend as its players' visas were declined. CyberZen from China replaced the MongolZ but its players could not get visas in time for the tournament. Chiefs eSports Club from Australia was next in line but it was unable to put together a five-man roster in time. The organizers then decided on the Americas Minor runners-up Splyce to take the spot.) (Americas Minor #2)
- Gambit Gaming (CIS Minor #1)
- Renegades (IEM Tapei #2)
- HellRaisers (Europe Minor #1)
- Tempo Storm (Note: The Games Academy roster was acquired by Tempo Storm.) (Americas Last Chance)
- Team YP (Europe Last Chance)
- SK Gaming (Europe Last Chance)

=== Qualifier results ===
Group A

Pos	Team	W	L	RF	RA	RD	Pts
1	G2 Esports	2	0	32	27	+5	6
2	FlipSid3 Tactics	2	1	62	39	+23	6
3	Tempo Storm	1	2	39	52	−13	3
4	Selfless Gaming	0	2	17	32	−15	0

Group A Results
FlipSid3 Tactics	16	13	Selfless Gaming
G2 Esports	16	13	Tempo Storm
Selfless Gaming	4	16	Tempo Storm
FlipSid3 Tactics	14	16	G2 Esports
FlipSid3 Tactics	2	0	Tempo Storm

Group B

Pos	Team	W	L	RF	RA	RD	Pts
1	mousesports	2	0	35	16	+19	6
2	Team Liquid	2	1	75	58	+17	6
3	HellRaisers	1	2	71	78	−7	3
4	Team YP	0	2	3	32	−29	0

Group B Results
Team Liquid	20	22	HellRaisers
mousesports	16	1	Team YP
Team Liquid	16	2	Team YP
mousesports	19	15	HellRaisers
HellRaisers	1	2	Team Liquid

Group C

Pos	Team	W	L	RF	RA	RD	Pts
1	Splyce	2	0	32	21	+11	6
2	Counter Logic Gaming	2	1	65	71	−6	6
3	Vexed Gaming	1	2	65	61	+4	3
4	SK Gaming	0	2	23	32	−9	0

Group C Results
Vexed Gaming	16	10	SK Gaming
Counter Logic Gaming	14	16	Splyce
Counter Logic Gaming	16	13	SK Gaming
Vexed Gaming	7	16	Splyce
Vexed Gaming	1	2	Counter Logic Gaming

Group D

Pos	Team	W	L	RF	RA	RD	Pts
1	Gambit Gaming	2	0	32	20	+12	6
2	Cloud9	2	1	60	59	+1	6
3	Renegades	1	2	57	60	−3	3
4	Team Dignitas	0	2	22	32	−10	0

Group D Results
Team Dignitas	9	16	Renegades
Cloud9	9	16	Gambit Gaming
Cloud9	16	13	Team Dignitas
Gambit Gaming	16	11	Renegades
Renegades	0	2	Cloud9

== Broadcast talent ==
Stage Hosts

- Paul "ReDeYe" Chaloner

Desk Host

- Scott "SirScoots" Smith

Interviewer

- Chris Puckett

Analysts

- Robin "Fifflaren" Johansson
- Richard Lewis
- Jason "moses" O'Toole
- Janko "YNk" Paunović
- Duncan "Thorin" Shields

Commentators

- James Bardolph
- Anders Blume
- Henry "HenryG" Greer
- Daniel "ddk" Kapadia
- Auguste "Semmler" Massonnat
- Matthew "Sadokist" Trivett
- Björn "THREAT" Pers (Guest Commentator for Team Liquid vs Luminosity Gaming)

Observers

- Heather "sapphiRe" Garozzo
- Kevin "kVIN_S" Swift

=== Broadcasts ===
All streams were broadcast on Twitch in various languages.

- MLG
- 99Damage
- Alien-h Casting
- BRMA TV
- CNONE
- GEC TV
- GPlayTV
- HitpointCZ
- Hungarian Esport TV
- IzakOOO
- OGamingTV
- Starladder
- striimIT
- TGPL

== Teams ==
Legends

- Team EnVyUs
- Natus Vincere
- FaZe Clan (Note: The roster of G2 was bought out by FaZe Clan for US$700,000, making the roster the most expensive in CSGO history.)
- Ninjas in Pyjamas
- Astralis (Note: The roster of Team SoloMid left the organization and temporarily played without a sponsor under then banner Team Questionmark. The players then came together and created the first player-founded organization, Astralis.)
- Virtus.pro
- Fnatic
- Luminosity Gaming

Qualifiers

- Counter Logic Gaming
- mousesports
- Cloud9
- Splyce
- FlipSid3 Tactics
- Team Liquid
- Gambit Gaming
- G2 Esports (Note: After losing its roster to FaZe, G2 acquired the roster of Titan after Titan ceased operations.)

=== Pre-Major ranking ===
The HLTV.org March 28, 2016 ranking, the final one released before MLG Columbus 2016, is displayed below.

HLTV.org Pre-Major Ranking

World Ranking
Place	Team	Points	Move^{†}
1	Fnatic	1000	Steady
2	Natus Vincere	667	Steady
3	Astralis	640	Steady
4	Luminosity Gaming	517	Steady
5	Team EnVyUs	339	Steady
6	Virtus.pro	259	Steady
8	G2 Esports	207	Steady
9	Ninjas in Pyjamas	196	▲1
10	mousesports	183	▼1
11	FaZe Clan	154	Steady
12	Cloud9	139	▲1
14	Counter Logic Gaming	124	Steady
16	FlipSid3 Tactics	93	▼1
18	Team Liquid	86	▼2
22	Gambit Gaming	59	▼1
27	Splyce	45	▼1

^{†}Change since March 21, 2016 ranking

== Group stage ==
The four groups were announced through MLG's social media accounts on March 10–11, 2016. Each group was seeded to contain a team who placed 1st–4th at DreamHack Open Cluj-Napoca 2015, a team who placed 5–8th at DreamHack Open Cluj–Napoca 2015, a team who went undefeated in the offline qualifiers, and a team who won one of the final decider matches in the offline qualifiers.

=== Group A ===
Pos	Team	W	L	RF	RA	RD	Pts
1	Luminosity Gaming	2	0	32	18	+14	2
2	Ninjas in Pyjamas	2	1	68	83	+5	2
3	mousesports	1	2	74	88	−14	1
4	FlipSid3 Tactics	0	2	45	50	−5	0

Group A matches
Ninjas in Pyjamas	1	0	FlipSid3 Tactics
Luminosity Gaming	1	0	mousesports
mousesports	1	0	FlipSid3 Tactics
Ninjas in Pyjamas	0	1	Luminosity Gaming
Ninjas in Pyjamas	2	1	mousesports

Group A Scores

Group A scores
Team	Score	Map	Score	Team
Ninjas in Pyjamas	19	Cache	17	FlipSid3 Tactics
Luminosity Gaming	16	Mirage	13	mousesports
mousesports	31	Cobblestone	28	FlipSid3 Tactics
Ninjas in Pyjamas	5	Mirage	16	Luminosity Gaming
Ninjas in Pyjamas	16	Cobblestone	5	mousesports
Ninjas in Pyjamas	12	Cache	16	mousesports
Ninjas in Pyjamas	16	Overpass	9	mousesports

=== Group B ===
Pos	Team	W	L	RF	RA	RD	Pts
1	Team Liquid	2	0	38	30	+8	2
2	Fnatic	2	1	67	43	+24	2
3	FaZe Clan	1	2	43	51	−8	1
4	Splyce	0	2	8	32	−24	0

Group B matches
FaZe Clan	0	1	Team Liquid
Fnatic	1	0	Splyce
FaZe Clan	1	0	Splyce
Fnatic	0	1	Team Liquid
Fnatic	2	0	FaZe Clan

Group B Scores

Group B scores
Team	Score	Map	Score	Team
FaZe Clan	11	Cache	16	Team Liquid
Fnatic	16	Train	5	Splyce
FaZe Clan	16	Inferno	5	Splyce
Fnatic	19	Dust II	22	Team Liquid
Fnatic	16	Mirage	10	FaZe Clan
Fnatic	16	Cobblestone	6	FaZe Clan
Fnatic	–	Cache	–	FaZe Clan

=== Group C ===
Pos	Team	W	L	RF	RA	RD	Pts
1	Astralis	2	0	32	19	+13	2
2	Counter Logic Gaming	2	1	70	61	+9	2
3	Gambit Gaming	1	2	63	74	−11	1
4	Team EnVyUs	0	2	21	32	−11	0

Group C matches
Team EnVyUs	0	1	Counter Logic Gaming
Astralis	1	0	Gambit Gaming
Team EnVyUs	0	1	Gambit Gaming
Astralis	1	0	Counter Logic Gaming
Counter Logic Gaming	2	1	Gambit Gaming

Group C Scores

Group C scores
Team	Score	Map	Score	Team
Team EnVyUs	8	Cobblestone	16	Counter Logic Gaming
Astralis	16	Train	10	Gambit Gaming
Team EnVyUs	13	Cache	16	Gambit Gaming
Astralis	16	Overpass	9	Counter Logic Gaming
Counter Logic Gaming	13	Cache	16	Gambit Gaming
Counter Logic Gaming	16	Cobblestone	11	Gambit Gaming
Counter Logic Gaming	16	Mirage	10	Gambit Gaming

=== Group D ===
Pos	Team	W	L	RF	RA	RD	Pts
1	Natus Vincere	2	0	32	13	+19	2
2	Virtus.pro	2	1	61	49	+12	2
3	G2 Esports	1	2	49	60	−11	1
4	Cloud9	0	2	12	32	−20	0

Group D matches
Natus Vincere	1	0	Cloud9
Virtus.pro	1	0	G2 Esports
G2 Esports	1	0	Cloud9
Natus Vincere	1	0	Virtus.pro
Virtus.pro	2	1	G2 Esports

Group D Scores

Group D scores
Team	Score	Map	Score	Team
Natus Vincere	16	Train	9	Cloud9
Virtus.pro	16	Train	1	G2 Esports
G2 Esports	16	Dust II	3	Cloud9
Natus Vincere	16	Cobblestone	4	Virtus.pro
Virtus.pro	16	Train	9	G2 Esports
Virtus.pro	9	Inferno	16	G2 Esports
Virtus.pro	16	Cobblestone	7	G2 Esports

== Playoffs ==
The playoffs bracket was announced on March 30, 2016. Each quarterfinals match was seeded to contain one top seed and one second seed from the group stage.

=== Bracket ===
Quarterfinals
D1	Natus Vincere	2
A2	Ninjas in Pyjamas	0
C1	Astralis	2
B2	Fnatic	0
B1	Team Liquid	2
C2	Counter Logic G.	0
A1	Luminosity Gaming	2
D2	Virtus.pro	1

Semifinals
D1	Natus Vincere	2
C1	Astralis	0
B1	Team Liquid	0
A1	Luminosity Gaming	2

Finals
D1	Natus Vincere	0
A1	Luminosity Gaming	2

=== Quarterfinals ===
==== Natus Vincere vs. Ninjas in Pyjamas ====
Casters: Anders Blume & Semmler

Natus Vincere vs. Ninjas in Pyjamas Scores
Team	Score	Map	Score	Team
Natus Vincere	16	Inferno	9	Ninjas in Pyjamas
Natus Vincere	16	Mirage	10	Ninjas in Pyjamas
Natus Vincere	–	Overpass	–	Ninjas in Pyjamas

==== Astralis vs Fnatic ====
Casters: James Bardolph & ddk

Astralis vs. Fnatic Scores
Team	Score	Map	Score	Team
Astralis	16	Overpass	10	Fnatic
Astralis	16	Cache	5	Fnatic
Astralis	–	Mirage	–	Fnatic

==== Team Liquid vs Counter Logic Gaming ====
Casters: Sadokist & HenryG

Team Liquid vs. Counter Logic Gaming Scores
Team	Score	Map	Score	Team
Team Liquid	16	Cache	13	Counter Logic Gaming
Team Liquid	16	Mirage	6	Counter Logic Gaming
Team Liquid	–	Train	–	Counter Logic Gaming

==== Luminosity Gaming vs Virtus.pro ====
Casters: Anders Blume & Semmler

Luminosity Gaming vs. Virtus.pro Scores
Team	Score	Map	Score	Team
Luminosity Gaming	17	Cache	19	Virtus.pro
Luminosity Gaming	16	Cobblestone	10	Virtus.pro
Luminosity Gaming	16	Overpass	11	Virtus.pro

=== Semifinals ===
==== Natus Vincere vs. Astralis ====
Casters: Sadokist & HenryG

Natus Vincere vs. Astralis Scores
Team	Score	Map	Score	Team
Natus Vincere	16	Inferno	14	Astralis
Natus Vincere	16	Dust II	5	Astralis
Natus Vincere	–	Mirage	–	Astralis

==== Team Liquid vs Luminosity Gaming ====
Casters: James Bardolph, ddk, & THREAT

Team Liquid vs. Luminosity Gaming Scores
Team	Score	Map	Score	Team
Team Liquid	15	Mirage	19	Luminosity Gaming
Team Liquid	16	Cache	19	Luminosity Gaming
Team Liquid	–	Cobblestone	–	Luminosity Gaming

=== Finals ===
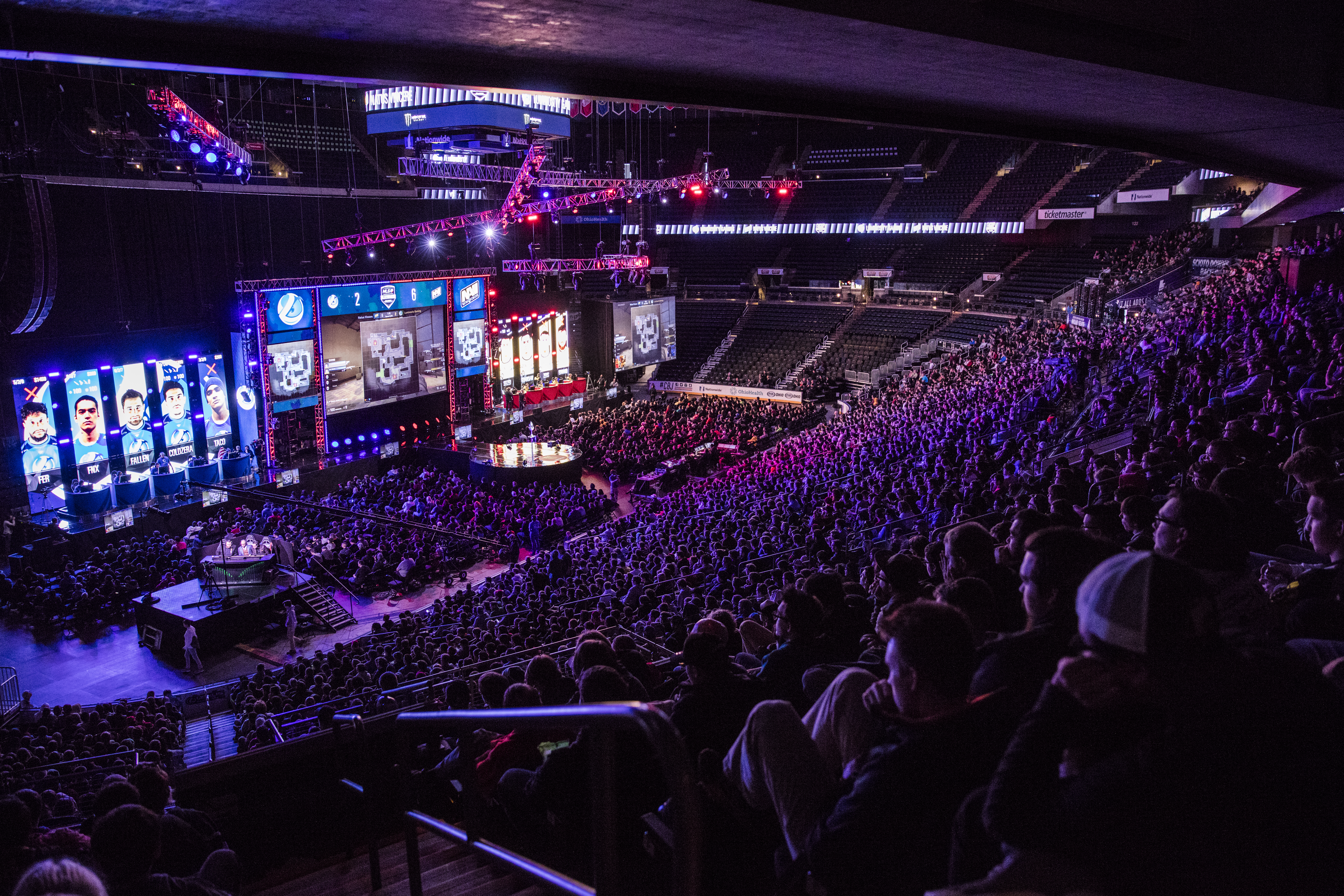
Nationwide Arena during the final between Luminosity and Natus Vincere

Casters: Anders Blume, Semmler, & moses

coldzera was named the MVP of MLG Columbus 2016.

Luminosity Gaming became the first team outside of Europe to win a Major title. Fnatic from Sweden still led all teams with three Majors at the time.

Natus Vincere vs. Luminosity Gaming Scores
Team	Score	Map	Score	Team
Natus Vincere	17	Mirage	19	Luminosity Gaming
Natus Vincere	2	Overpass	16	Luminosity Gaming
Natus Vincere	–	Train	–	Luminosity Gaming

== Final standings ==
The $1,000,000 prize pool was divided up as follows.

Place	Team	Prize Money	Seed	Roster	Coach
1st	Luminosity Gaming	US$500,000	ESL One Cologne 2016	FalleN, fer, coldzera, fnx, TACO	zews
2nd	Natus Vincere	US$150,000	ESL One Cologne 2016	Zeus, Edward, seized, flamie, GuardiaN	starix
3rd–4th	Astralis	US$70,000	ESL One Cologne 2016	karrigan, dev1ce, cajunb, dupreeh, Xyp9x	zonic
3rd–4th	Team Liquid	US$70,000	ESL One Cologne 2016	Hiko, nitr0, EliGE, adreN, s1mple	GBJame^s
5–8th	Ninjas in Pyjamas	US$35,000	ESL One Cologne 2016	GeT_RiGhT, f0rest, friberg, Xizt, THREAT	THREAT
5–8th	Fnatic	US$35,000	ESL One Cologne 2016	olofmeister, JW, KRiMZ, flusha, dennis	vuggo
5–8th	Counter Logic Gaming	US$35,000	ESL One Cologne 2016	tarik, hazed, reltuC, jdm64, FugLy	pita
5–8th	Virtus.Pro	US$35,000	ESL One Cologne 2016	NEO, TaZ, pashaBiceps, Snax, byali	kuben
9–12th	mousesports	US$8,750	ESL One Cologne 2016 Offline Qualifier	nex, Spiidi, denis, NiKo, chrisj	Kapio
9–12th	FaZe Clan	US$8,750	ESL One Cologne 2016 Offline Qualifier	fox, rain, jkaem, aizy, kioShiMa	RobbaN
9–12th	Gambit Gaming	US$8,750	ESL One Cologne 2016 Offline Qualifier	Dosia, hooch, AdreN, mou, wayLander	beAst
9–12th	G2 Esports	US$8,750	ESL One Cologne 2016 Offline Qualifier	RpK, shox, SmithZz, ScreaM, Ex6TenZ	NiaK
13–16th	FlipSid3 Tactics	US$8,750	ESL One Cologne 2016 Offline Qualifier	B1ad3, markeloff, bondik, Shara, WorldEdit	–
13–16th	Splyce	US$8,750	ESL One Cologne 2016 Offline Qualifier	arya, abE, Professor_Chaos, DAVEY, jasonR	Grt
13–16th	Team EnVyUs	US$8,750	ESL One Cologne 2016 Offline Qualifier	Happy, NBK, kennyS, apEX, DEVIL	Maniac
13–16th	Cloud9	US$8,750	ESL One Cologne 2016 Offline Qualifier	n0thing, Skadoodle, fREAKAZOiD, Stewie2k, shroud	–

=== Post-Major Ranking ===
The HLTV.org April 5, 2016 rankings of teams in the major is displayed below. The ranking was the first one released after MLG Columbus 2016.

HLTV.org Post-Major Ranking

World Ranking
Place	Team	Points	Move^{†}
1	Fnatic	958	Steady
2	Luminosity Gaming	869	▲2
3	Natus Vincere	827	▼1
4	Astralis	719	▼1
5	Virtus.pro	307	▲1
6	Team EnVyUs	280	▼1
7	Ninjas in Pyjamas	235	▲2
8	G2 Esports	200	Steady
9	Team Liquid	194	▲9
10	mousesports	192	Steady
12	Counter Logic Gaming	179	▲2
13	Cloud9	130	▼1
15	FaZe Clan	107	▼4
16	FlipSid3 Tactics	94	2
18	Gambit Gaming	85	▲4
28	Splyce	41	▼1

^{†}Change since March 28, 2016 ranking
