= Flipside Tactics =

American eSports organization

Flipsid3 Tactics
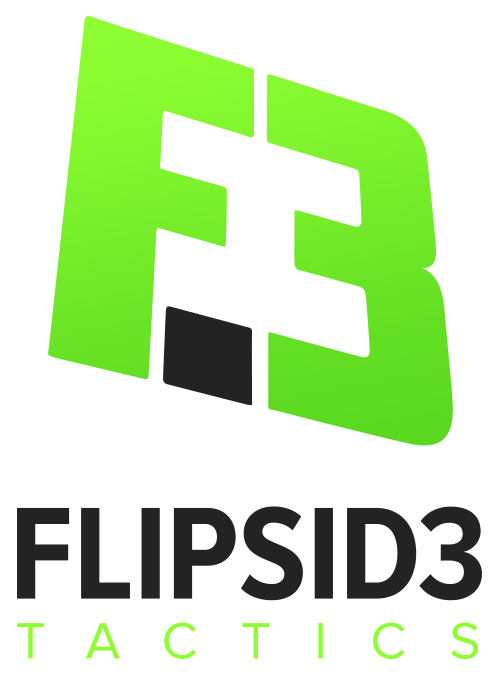
- Divisions: Counter-Strike: Global Offensive, Crossfire, Rocket League, [[Soldier Front]] and fighting games
- Location: United States (HQ); Ukraine (CS:GO); Europe (Rocket League)
- Partners: Sennheiser; BenQ; Twitch
- Website: www.flipsidetactics.com

Flipsid3 Tactics was an esports organization based in the United States. Flipside had teams competing in Counter-Strike: Global Offensive, Halo, Crossfire, fighting games, StarCraft II, iRacing, Tom Clancy's Rainbow Six Siege, Rocket League, Soldier Front, and Dota 2. Former professional football player Ricky Lumpkin was a co-owner of the team.

== Counter-Strike ==
The team had a Counter-Strike: Global Offensive based in Ukraine. They have previously hosted three Swedish squads, as well as a South African academy team.

=== Roster ===
ID	Name	Join date
B1ad3	Andrey Gorodensky	2015-02-01
WorldEdit	Georgi Yaskin	2015-02-01
markeloff	Yegor Markelov	2015-02-01
wayLander	Jan Peter Rahkonen	2016-06-20
lollipop21k	Igor Solodkov	2018-04-20

=== Tournament results ===
Bold denotes a CS:GO Major

- 9–12th — **DreamHack Winter 2014**
- 13–16th — **ESL One Katowice 2015**
- 1st — CIS Championship Voronezh
- 9–12th — **ESL One Cologne 2015**
- 3rd-4th — Electronic Sports World Cup 2015
- 13–16th — **DreamHack Open Cluj-Napoca 2015**
- 13–16th — **MLG Major Championship: Columbus**
- 5-8th — **ESL One Cologne 2016**
- 11-14th — ELEAGUE Season 1
- 5-8th — StarLadder i-League StarSeries Season 2
- 5-6th — DreamHack Winter 2016
- 1st — DreamHack Leipzig 2017
- 15-16th — **ELEAGUE Major 2017**
- 9-11th — **PGL 2017 Kraków Major Championship**

== Rocket League ==
On August 25, 2015, Flipsid3 acquired the Teamy Weamy roster consisting of Markydooda, kuxir97, and M1k3Rules. On August 7, 2016, Flipside lost to iBUYPOWER Cosmic in the very first Rocket League Championship Series finals, placing second. Shortly after, M1k3 left the team and was subsequently replaced by Marius "gReazymeister" Ranheim from Northern Gaming (formerly We Dem Girlz). On December 4, 2016, Flipsid3 defeated Mockit Aces to win the Rocket League Championship Series for Season 2.

On February 28, 2019, it was announced that the roster that had won WSOE 4 a month prior had chosen to not re-sign with Flipsid3. With the departure of the roster, it was also announced that Flipsid3 would not be participating in RLCS Season 7, ending the reign of the longest standing organization within Rocket League.

=== Tournament results (majors) ===
- 1st - Rocket League MLG Championship Series Season 1 Final
- 2nd — Rocket League Championship Series Season 1 Final
- 1st — Rocket League Championship Series Season 2 Final
- 5th — Rocket League Championship Series Season 3 Final
- 1st - DreamHack Summer 2017
- 5-6th — Rocket League Championship Series Season 4 Final
- 5-8th — DreamHack Open Leipzig
- 5-6th — Rocket League Championship Series Season 6 Final
- 1st - WSOE 4: The Rocket League Showdown

== Fighting games ==
The Flipsid3 Tactics FGC team was founded on August 5, 2015, by Chris "NinjaCW" Harris. NinjaCW died on October 9, 2016. He was replaced by Matthew "Glitch" Testini as the new manager on October 28, 2016.

ID	Name	Game(s)	Joined
alucarD	Antwan Ortiz	Street Fighter V	2015-07-18
LuCkyL0oPz	Allan Paris	Dead or Alive 5: Last Round	2015-08-05
Sleep	Darnell Waller	Killer Instinct	2015-08-15
Brolynho	Thomas Proença	Street Fighter V	2016-10-28
