= Gambit Esports =

Russian esports organization

- Short name: GMB
- Divisions: Dota 2 Fortnite Battle Royale; Valorant
- Founded: 14 January 2013; 13 years ago
- Folded: 6 August 2022
- Location: Moscow, Russia
- Colors: Red and blue
- Partners: AS Monaco; Liga Stavok; LG UltraGear; Nervos Network; Abios
- Parent group: MTS
- Website: gambit.gg

Previous logos of Gambit Esports from 2013 to 2015 (top) and 2016 to 2020 (bottom)

Gambit Esports, formerly Gambit Gaming, is an inactive Russian esports organization owned by telecommunications company MTS. It was established in January 2013 after the acquisition of the former League of Legends roster of Moscow Five.

Gambit has teams competing in Apex Legends, Dota 2, Fortnite Battle Royale, and Valorant. It previously had a League of Legends team competing in the European League of Legends Championship Series (EU LCS), and later the League of Legends Continental League (LCL).

== Counter-Strike: Global Offensive ==
=== History ===
On 8 January 2016, Gambit acquired a CS:GO roster consisting mostly of former HellRaisers players. The players were Mikhail "Dosia" Stolyarov, Dauren "AdreN" Kystaubayev, Rustem "mou" Telepov, Dmitry "hooch" Bogdanov, and Jan "wayLander" Rahkonen. Gambit qualified for MLG Columbus 2016, beating Renegades and Cloud9 in the offline qualifier and later placed 9–12th at the main event. Gambit announced the departure of wayLander on 18 April 2016 and officially signed Ivan "spaze" Obrezhan on 19 April 2016. Gambit removed spaze from the active roster on 24 September 2016 and used Emil "kUcheR" Akhundov as a stand-in. Dmitry "hooch" Bogdanov was removed from the team on 2 October 2016. Daniil "Zeus" Teslenko and Abay "HObbit" Khasenov joined Gambit on 12 October, the latter being a six-month loan from the Kazakhstani team Tengri. Gambit won Acer Predator Masters 3 after beating Team Kinguin 3–0 in the finals on 5 November 2016.

On 23 July 2017, Gambit defeated Immortals 2–1 in the grand final of the PGL Major 2017 in Krakow.

On 9 August 2017, Zeus and Kane stepped down from Gambit to join Natus Vincere.

On 5 September 2020, Gambit Youngsters coach Ivan "F_1N" Kochugov admitted using the coaching bug that allowed him to give information about enemy players. He was suspended by Gambit.

On 5 October 2020, Gambit promoted its academy team, Gambit Youngsters, to the main line-up, after they managed to stay in the weekly updated HLTV top 30 ranking for 12 consecutive weeks.

On 24 April 2022, Gambit sold its roster to Cloud9 following bans from various event organizers due to the 2022 Russian invasion of Ukraine.

== League of Legends ==
Gambit Esports
- Short name: GMB
- Game: League of Legends
- Founded: 14 January 2013
- Folded: 22 April 2021
- League: EU LCS (2013–2015); LCL (2016–2021)
- Team history: MTG (2011); Team Empire (2011); Moscow Five (2011–2012); Gambit Gaming (2013–2015); Gambit.CIS (2016–2017); Gambit Esports (2018–2021)
- Based in: Moscow, Russia
- Head coach: Igors "ATRemains" Radkevič
- Manager: Vladimir "Kayos" Ivanov
- Championships: 3× LCL: 2017 Summer; 2018 Spring; 2018 Summer
- Analyst: Evgeny "Seigimitsu" Podlobnikov

=== History ===
==== EU LCS (2013–2015) ====
On 10 January 2013, the now-defunct esports organisation Moscow Five released their League of Legends roster that achieved 3rd–4th place at the 2012 World Championship; this was in part due to the arrest of their CEO Dmitry Smilianets in July 2013, which left the organisation with a lack of funding for several months. Four days later, on 14 January, it was announced that Gambit Gaming had acquired the former M5 roster.

Marking their first appearance in an offline event as Gambit Gaming, in late January 2013, the Russian team would compete in IEM Season VII - Global Challenge Katowice as one of the eight qualified teams. Gambit Gaming would go 1–2 in the group stage, winning against MYM, while losing to Curse Gaming EU and Azubu Blaze. This resulted in a three-way tie between MYM, Gambit, and Curse Gaming EU, each finishing 1–2. A time coefficient was used to break the tie, giving Gambit Gaming a spot in the semi-finals. Gambit Gaming, as the underdogs, would defeat Azubu Frost 2–0, then go on to take first place by knocking out Korean powerhouse Azubu Blaze, who they had lost to in the group stage.

Having qualified as Moscow Five, Gambit Gaming would compete in the European Season 3 League of Legends Championship Series. They would complete the European Spring LCS Split in 2nd place, with a record of 21–7. This ensured their LCS spot for the summer split portion of the league. They would then take second place in the Season 3 EU Spring Playoffs, losing 2–3 to Fnatic in the final.

Gambit attended the IEM Season VII - World Championship in Hannover, Germany in March. The team dominated their group, going undefeated with a 5–0 score, placing them in the semi-finals. They then faced CJ Entus Frost and lost the set 2–1, knocking Gambit out of the tournament and seeing them finish in 3rd overall.

The Russian team was invited to play in an international exhibition at 2013 MLG Winter Championship, playing first against Americans Team Dignitas, they won 2–0, by constantly pressuring their opponent. Gambit then faced Korean top contender KT Rolster B in the exhibition finals but were unable to beat them and secure 1st place, losing the match 2–1.

In April 2013, Gambit Gaming players Danil "Diamondprox" Reshetnikov, Aleksei "Alex Ich" Ichetovkin, Evgeny "Genja" Andryushin, and Edward "Edward" Abgaryan were publicly voted to represent their respective positions on the Europe LCS All Star team, to compete at All-Star Shanghai 2013 and play against the world's best All Star teams, chosen in the same fashion. However, a rule stating that only 3 members of any team, could be inducted onto the team caused Genja to be replaced as AD Carry by Evil Geniuses' Yellowpete. The team's top lane was sOAZ from Fnatic. The EU LCS first faced off against heavy favorites Korean OGN Champions, and although good early game play from jungler Diamondprox looked promising for the team, the Koreans overtook them in a 2-0 set. Their next opponent was from their sibling league, the North America LCS. NA LCS ended up being the victor, knocking the EU LCS out of the tournament.

In July 2013, GoSu Papper left the team to join Team Curse.

On 17 August 2013, Gambit Gaming would finish the Summer Split tied up for 2nd place, at 15–13, along with Fnatic, Evil Geniuses and Ninjas in Pyjamas. However they managed to secure a 4th-place finish after losing the tie breaker against Evil Geniuses, going on to defeat Ninjas in Pyjamas in the losers bracket then losing again to Evil Geniuses in the deciders match, which granted Gambit Gaming a spot on the Summer Playoffs.

Gambit would then play against Ninjas in Pyjamas in the Summer Playoffs, defeating them 2-0 and advancing to the Semifinals where they would lose 0–2 against Lemondogs, dropping the 3rd Place Match to face Evil Geniuses, in a match that decided the third team that would represent Europe in the Season 3 World Championship. Gambit was victorious and claimed the win over Evil Geniuses, 2–1.

Gambit was placed into a tough group with fellow European rivals Fnatic, North American third seed Team Vulcun, Korean OGN Spring Winners Samsung Galaxy Ozone and Filipino champions Mineski. They earned an undefeated 3-0 their first day of the group stage, looking extremely strong as Europe's third seed. Gambit continued to play solidly throughout the groups, finishing in a tie for 2nd place with Samsung Galaxy Ozone at 5–3. In a close tiebreaker game against the Korean team, Gambit emerged victorious and advanced to the playoffs with fellow European competitor Fnatic.

Gambit faced off against the Korean first seed NaJin Black Sword in the quarterfinals. NaJin Black Sword was called a "dark horse threat" by caster MonteCristo since they had not competed in the previous two months and had recently replaced their starting mid laner, SSONG, with substitute player Nagne. After winning the first game, Gambit succumbed to the Koreans 1–2, thus being eliminated from the tournament and taking home seventh place.

Gambit's first tournament in the 2014 season was the IEM World Championship. The team were knocked out in the semifinals by KT Rolster Bullets.

The Spring Split was a slight disappointment for Gambit. Also, due to visa issues, Darien, Diamondprox, Alex Ich, and Genja were all unable to play in the 6th week of the Spring Season. Zorozero, Hulberto, Nukeduck, and fury III substituted for Top, Jungle, Mid, and ADC respectively. The team ended up coming in 5th in the tournament, after losing to Team ROCCAT in the quarterfinals.

In May Alex Ich left Gambit for Challenger Series team Ninjas in Pyjamas to spend more time with his family. His departure from Gambit ultimately meant that the Summer Split would be worse for the team than the spring split. Gambit struggled throughout, with Darien, Diamondprox and Genja becoming substitutes for periods over the split. The team finished in 7th place, meaning that they would have to fight for their LCS status in the Spring Promotion.

Due to their 1st-place finish at IEM Cologne, the team were invited to compete at the IEM Season IX - World Championship. After a Round 1 loss against CJ Entus, Gambit Gaming were knocked out of the tournament, losing to Team WE in Round 1 of the losers bracket. Domestically, they finished fourth in the spring LCS round robin and then tied for fifth with Copenhagen Wolves in the playoffs after a quarterfinal loss to Unicorns Of Love. After the playoffs, the team released Leviathan from his position as head coach, citing commitment issues in the latter half of the season.

Gambit Gaming had an unsuccessful Summer Split. After a rocky early start to the season and a combined 0–4 record in the first two weeks, Gambit improved to fifth place after 8 weeks, largely thanks to the coaching of Shaunz. At one point the team had the potential of finishing as high as fourth. However, going into the last week of the split, FORG1VEN received a four-game-long penalty from Riot as the result of toxic behavior in soloqueue. Moopz subbed in as the team's AD carry for the last 2 games of the split. Losing these 2 games, the team finished the regular season in 8th place, meaning that they would be playing in the 2016 Spring Promotion.

Gambit's LCS spot was sold to Team Vitality in December 2015.

==== LCL (2016–2021) ====
On 12 January 2016, Gambit reentered the professional League of Legends scene after acquiring a spot in the newly formed LCL challenger series. The team branded itself as Gambit.CIS and fielded a new roster consisting of Fomko, LeX, Archie, BloodFenix and FatoNN.

After playing through the challenger series, Gambit qualified for the promotion tournament, where they defeated Team Differential 3-0 and qualified for the League of Legends Continental League (LCL). The team then finished 6th in the 2016 LCL Summer Split with a record of 6–8.

Gambit ended at the second place of group stage with 9 wins and 5 losses, securing a playoff spot. In playoffs, Gambit beat Team Just 3–2 in the semifinals and Dragon Army 3–1 in the finals to win the split and qualify for the 2018 World Championship Play-in Stage.

Gambit was drawn in Play-in stage Group D with G-Rex from Hong Kong (LMS) and Kaos Latin Gamers from Latin America South. They lost both games to G-Rex but won both games against Kaos Latin Gamers and qualified for Play-in stage round 2 at 2nd place. Gambit was drawn against Cloud9 from North America in round 2 and lost 2–3, therefore not qualifying to the main event group stage.

== Dota 2 ==
On February 9, 2021, Gambit Esports entered a partnership with football club AS Monaco. The team was rebranded to AS Monaco Gambit. On February 11 a new roster was announced consisting of then Live to Win's roster and No[o]ne joins as a stand-in. The former team continued to play together under the name of Gambit-2.

=== Roster ===
AS Monaco Gambit Dota 2 roster
Players
Coaches

Handle	Name	Nationality
alberkaaa	Chernoivanov, Albert	Russia
Lorenof	Melnick, Artem	Ukraine
meLes	Romanov, Andrei	Russia
Immersion	Khmelevskoi, Aleksandr	Russia
HappyDyurara	Horonzhiy, Sergey	Belarus

Head coach

Vladimir "Chappie" Kuzmenko

Legend:
- (I) Inactive
- (S) Suspended
- Substitute
- (injured) Injury / Illness

Latest roster transaction: 20 November 2021.

== Valorant ==
On 28 September 2020, Gambit Esports entered the professional Valorant scene by announcing their first roster.

On 20 September 2021, they defeated Team Envy in the finals and won the Valorant Champions Tour Masters Berlin 2021.

On 12 December 2021, Gambit reached the final of the first edition of the VALORANT Champions, losing to Acend 2–3.

=== Roster ===
Gambit Valorant roster
Players
Coaches

Handle	Name	Nationality
Chronicle	Khromov, Timofey	Russia
d3ffo	Sudakov, Nikita	Russia
Sheydos	Naumov, Bogdan	Russia
nAts	Akhmetshin, Ayaz	Russia
Redgar	Vlasov, Igor	Russia

Head coach

Andrey "Engh" Sholokhov

Legend:
- (I) Inactive
- (S) Suspended
- Substitute
- (injured) Injury / Illness

Latest roster transaction: 19 January 2021.

Awards and achievements
Preceded by ELEAGUE Major 2017; Astralis	PGL Major Kraków 2017 winner 2017	Succeeded by ELEAGUE Major: Boston 2018; Cloud9
