= Luminosity Gaming =

North American professional esports organization

- Short name: LG
- Divisions: Call of Duty, Hearthstone, World of Warcraft, Smite, Super Smash Bros., Madden NFL, PUBG, Fortnite, Apex Legends, Brawl Stars, Rocket League, League of Legends
- Founded: 2015
- Based in: Toronto, Canada
- CEO: Alex Gonzalez
- Partners: Twitch; Kinguin; Zowie; CyberPowerPC; HyperX; AlphaDraft; GG.Bet; Games Academy
- Website: www.luminosity.gg

Luminosity Gaming is a professional esports organization based in North America. It has teams competing in Counter-Strike 2, Call of Duty, Overwatch, Tom Clancy's Rainbow Six: Siege, Super Smash Bros., Fortnite, Apex Legends, Rocket League, Pokémon Unite, Brawl Stars and League of Legends. The team was founded in Canada by Steve "Buyaka" Maida in 2015, and is based in Toronto, Ontario.

== History ==
In May 2019, Luminosity Gaming began a merger with Enthusiast Gaming which concluded in September of that year. On August 30, 2025, Luminosity was sold to Vertiqal Studios; in the following months, several Luminosity employees and creators alleged that the company had fallen behind on payments to them. In January 2026, Luminosity was sold back to Maida.

== Current divisions ==
=== Counter-Strike: Global Offensive ===
On April 30, 2015, Peter "ptr" Gurney joined the team as an AWPer. On July 29 it was announced that Luminosity dropped its roster and picked up a team based in Brazil that consisted of Gabriel "FalleN" Toledo, Fernando "fer" Alvarenga, Lucas "steel" Lopes, Ricardo "boltz" Prass, and Marcelo "coldzera" David. In November 2015 Luminosity reached the quarterfinals of DreamHack Open Cluj-Napoca 2015. Luminosity won MLG Columbus 2016 on April 3, 2016. On May 8, 2016, Luminosity won DreamHack Austin where they beat fellow Brazilian team Tempo Storm 2–0 in the finals. A couple of days later on May 16, 2016, the team won the ESL Pro League Season 3 Finals after beating G2 Esports 3–2 in the finals. On June 24, 2016, it was officially announced that the Brazilian roster would be joining SK Gaming on July 1, 2016. The roster's final tournament with Luminosity was the Esports Championship Series Season 1 Finals where they placed second, losing to G2 Esports in the finals.

Luminosity signed the Brazilian team WinOut on July 30, 2016. Its roster consisted of Renato "nak" Nakano, Bruno "bit" Lima, Lucas "destinyy" Bullo, Vinicios "PKL" Coelho, Gustavo "yeL" Knittel and is coached by Alessandro "apoka" Marcucci. Renato "nak" Nakano and Bruno "bit" Lima were kicked on the team on September 8, 2016. Gustavo "SHOOWTiME" Gonçalves and Bruno "shz" Martinelli joined Luminosity on September 11.

On September 12, 2019, Luminosity dropped its second Brazilian roster.

On July 1, 2026, Luminosity returned to Counter-Strike for their first roster in Counter-Strike 2, this time signing all but one player from the European team Monte as well as Brazilian Lucas "lux" Meneghini from Legacy.

At Stake Ranked Episode 6 in November 2026, Luminosity defeated pre-match favourites Ninjas in Pyjamas 2–0 to reach the upper-bracket final, where they lost 2–0 to Sangal.

=== Super Smash Bros. ===
On October 8, 2016, Luminosity Gaming signed their first Super Smash Bros. for 3DS and Wii U representative being the Japanese Mewtwo player Abadango. Shortly after, they signed their first Super Smash Bros. Melee player being European Fox main Ice. Both players left shortly before the start of 2018 ending their Smash Division. This was until Melee player Ginger was signed in February 2021. On October 9, 2022, they announced Enrique Hernández ("Maister") as their first Super Smash Bros. Ultimate player. The following year on March 23, 2023, they announced they had signed two more Ultimate players, being Gavin Dempsey ("Tweek") and Leonardo López ("MkLeo"). In May 2024, they announced that they had signed the Smash Ultimate player and content creator Tyler Martins ("Marss"). The following month, Luminosity announced they would be returning to the Melee scene, by signing Miles Foster ("Soonsay") and Justin Hallett ("Wizzrobe") as players.

== Rosters ==
Luminosity Gaming rosters

Apex Legends
Handle	Name	Nationality
sweetdreams	Sexton, Christopher	United States
Sikezz	Tanner Odom, Nicholas	United States
Fuhhnq	Wall, Nicholas	United States

Counter-Strike 2
Handle	Name	Nationality
afro	Drapier, Aurélien	France
AZUWU	Bell, Oscar	United Kingdom
lux	Meneghini, Lucas	Brazil
Rainwaker	Petrov, Aleks	Bulgaria
yxngstxr	Boije, Simon	Sweden
Bymas (I)	Pipiras, Aurimas	Lithuania

Pokémon Unite
Handle	Name	Nationality
Slashcan	Tucker, Sean	United States
Otter	De Mier, Allan	United States
Kyriaos	Lee, Kihyun	United States
Overlord98	Byrnes, William	United States
Trainer	Calle-Perez, Leonardo Gregorio	United States

Super Smash Bros. Melee
Handle	Name	Nationality
Soonsay	Foster, Miles	Canada
Wizzrobe	Hallett, Justin	United States

Super Smash Bros. Ultimate
Handle	Name	Nationality
MkLeo	Perez, Leonardo	Mexico
Maister	Solís, Enrique	Mexico
Sonix	Perez, Carlos	Dominican Republic
Tweek	Dempsey, Gavin	United States
Marss	Martins, Tyler	United States
VoiD	Makekau-Tyson, James	United States

Rocket League
Handle	Name	Nationality
Sphinx	Hakim, Nik Aiman	Malaysia
sosa	Petrozza, Gianluca	Canada
Catalysm	Christ Ramos, Leonardo	Germany

Legend:
- (I) Inactive
- (S) Suspended
- (L) On loan
- (2W) Two-way player
- Substitute
- (injured) Injury / Illness

== Former divisions ==
=== Hearthstone ===
On January 11, 2015, Luminosity picked up Stanislav Cifka, Nuno "Ignite" Pinho and Josh "Impact" Graham. On July 13, 2015, Christopher "PHONETAP" Huynh left Team Hearthlytics and joined Luminosity.

=== Madden NFL 17 ===
On October 15, 2016, Luminosity picked up Eric "Problem" Wright. Widely known as the GOAT (Greatest Of All Time) in the Madden franchise, Problem is the only 3-time winner of the Madden Challenge. No one else has won more than one. He also won Madden Nation, Season 3, which was featured on ESPN, along with numerous other tournaments.

=== Tom Clancy's Rainbow Six: Siege ===
On June 22, 2019, Luminosity picked a Tom Clancy's Rainbow Six: Siege team that consisted of Coal "Doodle" Phillips, Kian "Hyena" Moyazani, Richie "Rexen" Coronado, Tom "Tomas" Kaka, and Muteeb "PiXeL" Chaudary. They quickly became a top team in North American Pro League defeating top teams DarkZero Esports and Team Reciprocity. Luminosity placed third in the online qualifier for the Six Major Raleigh and failed to qualify for the event. In Dreamhack Montreal 2019, Luminosity lost to Team Liquid and BDS Esport being eliminated in the group stage and placing 13-16th, alongside top European team, Chaos Esports Club and amateur teams Livid Gaming and Super Nova. After this defeat, PiXeL left the team and was replaced with former player of Rise Nation, Abdullah "Factor" Rihan. Luminosity placed 4th in North American Pro League Season 10, failing to reach the Season 10 finals but avoiding relegation.

=== League of Legends ===
On November 26, 2024, Luminosity announced their entry into League of Legends by entering the North American Challengers League (NACL). The NACL is the second-tier league for teams in North America, with its best teams earning a shot to be promoted to the League of Legends Championship of The Americas (LTA) North Conference as guests. Luminosity won both splits of the NACL, beating DarkZero to win Spring and Conviction to win Summer, the latter qualifying them for the promotion tournament. However, Luminosity did not get promoted to the LTA North after losing to the league's sole guest team Disguised in the grand final. The organization did not return to League of Legends for the 2026 season.

== See also ==
- Seattle Surge
- Vancouver Titans

Awards and achievements
Preceded by DreamHack Cluj-Napoca 2015; Team EnVyUs	MLG Columbus 2016 winner 2016	Succeeded by ESL One Cologne 2016; SK Gaming
