= Selfless Gaming =

American esports organization

- Short name: Selfless
- Divisions: Counter-Strike: Global Offensive, Killer Instinct, Overwatch, Rocket League
- Founded: 2016
- Folded: 2017
- Manager: Bradford Rajani
- Partners: Clutch Chairz; Meta Threads
- Website: selfless.gg

Selfless Gaming was an American esports organization with teams competing in Counter-Strike: Global Offensive, Killer Instinct, Overwatch and Rocket League.

The team was formed by former Enemy eSports CS:GO members on February 21, 2016. Selfless's CS:GO team ELeague Season 1 after Tyloo was unable to obtain visas in team.

Longtime lineup member Skyler “Relyks” Weaver left the lineup on August 25, 2016.

== Killer Instinct ==
=== Roster ===
- Damien "Fiyah Liger" Walton

== Counter-Strike: Global Offensive ==
=== Tournament results ===
- 19th-24th — ELeague season 1

== Overwatch ==
=== Roster ===
- Jay "sinatraa" Won
- Daniel "Dafran" Francesca
- Bobby "Kresnik" Wierner
- Jeff "emongg" Anderson
- Michael "Michael3D" Wilbanks
- Daniel "dhaK" Martinez Paz

== Rocket League ==
=== Roster ===
- Chris "Dappur" Mendoza
- Jesus "Mijo" Gutierrez
- Branden "Pluto" Schenetzki
- Timi "Timi" Falodun
