= StarLadder Major: Berlin 2019 =

Esports tournament

StarLadder Major 2019
- 2019
- The StarLadder Major 2019 logo

Tournament information
- Sport: Counter-Strike: Global Offensive
- Location: Berlin, Germany
- Dates: August 23–September 8, 2019
- Administrator: Valve; StarLadder
- Tournament format(s): Two 16 team swiss-system group stages 8 team single-elimination playoff
- Venue: Verti Music Hall; Mercedes-Benz Arena
- Teams: 24
- Purse: US$1,000,000

Final positions
- Champions: Astralis (4th title)
- 1st runners-up: AVANGAR
- 2nd runners-up: Renegades; NRG Esports
- MVP: Nicolai "dev1ce" Reedtz

The StarLadder Major: Berlin 2019, also known as StarLadder Major 2019 or Berlin 2019, was the fifteenth Counter-Strike: Global Offensive (CS:GO) Major Championship. It was held in Berlin, Germany from August 23 to September 8, 2019. Fourteen teams qualified for this Major based on their placement at the previous Major, Katowice 2019, while another ten teams qualified from their respective regional qualifiers. It featured a US$1,000,000 prize pool, the eighth consecutive Major with this prize pool. It was also the first time the Ukrainian-based organization StarLadder.

Astralis won the final against underdogs AVANGAR to become the only team in CS:GO history to win four Majors, and the only team to win three Majors consecutively. Astralis's Nicolai "dev1ce" Reedtz was the MVP, joining coldzera as the only players to have two Major MVPs.

== Background ==
Counter-Strike: Global Offensive is a multiplayer first-person shooter video game developed by Hidden Path Entertainment and Valve. It is the fourth game in the Counter-Strike series. In professional CS:GO, the Valve-sponsored Majors are the most prestigious tournaments.

The defending champions were Astralis, after winning their second consecutive and third total Major at IEM Katowice 2019. Astralis and Fnatic entered the tournament tied for most Major titles.

== Format ==
The Major cycle began with four Minors, or regional qualifiers: Americas, Asia, CIS, and Europe. Two teams from each qualifier moved on to the Major. In addition, because Valve reduced the number of direct Major invites from sixteen to fourteen, the third-place teams at each respective Minor advanced to a third-place qualifier that sent two more teams to the Major.

The Major featured twenty-four teams. The top eight teams from the Katowice 2019 were the Legends, and the remaining sixteen teams—the teams that placed ninth through fourteenth at Katowice and the ten teams that advanced from the Minors—were known as Challengers.

The Major was split into three stages. The first stage was the New Challengers stage, featuring all Challengers in a Swiss-system tournament: the top eight teams advanced to the next stage and the bottom eight teams were eliminated. Teams in the New Challengers stage were initially given an Elo ranking based on the HLTV world rankings. Each round of matches was seeded based on this Elo system. The second stage was the New Legends stage, a second Swiss-system group stage seeded in the same way. This stage featured the eight Legends from the Katowice Major and the eight teams advancing from the New Challengers stage. Like the New Challengers stage, the New Legends stage also advanced the top eight teams and eliminated the bottom eight teams. All teams from this stage except the bottom two teams earned automatic invites to the following Major. The final stage was the New Champions stage, and teams that advanced to this stage received Legends status at the following Major. This stage featured an eight team, best-of-three, single elimination bracket.

=== Map pool ===
The map pool for this Major changed from Katowice 2019. Valve took Cache out of the map pool and announced it would be redesigned. Rather than reintroducing Cobblestone, which had been in the map pool in previous Majors, Valve added Vertigo to the competitive map pool for the first time.

Maps

- Dust II
- Mirage
- Inferno
- Nuke
- Train
- Overpass
- Vertigo

== Minors ==
Each regional qualifier, called "Minors", featured eight teams. Each Minor also had a US$50,000 prize pool, with first place receiving US$30,000, second place taking in US$15,000, and third place raking in the last US$5,000. Like past recent Minors, no teams were directly invited to the Minors. There is no prize pool for the third place play in. The Europe and Americas Minors will start on July 17 and last until July 21. The CIS and Asia Minors will start on July 24 and last until July 28; the third place play in will take place on July 29.

Each Minor will feature two groups of four teams in a standard, GSL format group stage. The highest and lowest seed of the group and then other two teams will play in a best of one. The winners will play in a best of three and then the losers will play in a best of three. The winner of the winner's match will qualify for the bracket stage while the loser of the loser's match will be eliminated. The last two teams in the group will play in a best of three; the winner will move on to the bracket stage and the loser will be eliminated. The bracket stage will be a four team, best of three, double elimination bracket. The top two teams will qualify for the New Challengers stage of the Major, the third place team will have another shot in the third place play-in, while the fourth place team will be eliminated.

The third place play-in will be a four team, double elimination bracket. The initial and winner's match will be a best of one while the elimination matches will be a best of three. The top three teams move on to the Major as Cloud9 lost their Major spot so the spot is replaced by a team from the third place play-in.

=== Americas Minor ===
The Americas Minor will feature six teams from North America and two teams from South America. The North American closed qualifier featured sixteen teams, with eight teams being invited and another eight teams coming from four open qualifiers. Like the Europe Minor closed qualifier, the North America qualifier was a sixteen team, double elimination, best of three bracket. Notable teams such as Luminosity Gaming, Team Envy, and Boston 2018 champions Cloud9 failed to make it to the Minor. The South America qualifier initially had eight invited teams, but DETONA Gaming's Vinicius "v$m" Moreira had a VAC ban, forcing the team to withdraw from the qualifier. The last spot was filled in by a last chance qualifier.

Teams

- eUnited (NA Closed #1–4)
- FURIA Esports (NA Closed #1–4)
- NRG Esports (NA Closed #1–4)
- Team One (NA Closed #5–6)
- Team Singularity (NA Closed #5–6)
- Luminosity Gaming (NA Closed #7–8) (Note: Lazarus Gaming decide to withdraw from the Minor due to roster issues involving Braxton "swag" Pierce, who was permanently banned by Valve due to his involvement in the iBUYPOWER and NetcodeGuides.com match fixing scandal. StarLadder decided to replace the team with the two teams that placed 7th in the closed qualifier: Team Envy and Luminosity Gaming. However, Envy decided not to have a chance to attend the Major and attend Intel Extreme Masters Season XIV – Chicago, giving the spot to Luminosity.)
- Sharks Esports (SA Closed #1)
- INTZ eSports (SA Closed #2)

Notes

Upper round 1
A1	INTZ eSports	2
B2	Sharks Esports	0
B1	NRG Esports	2
A2	FURIA Esports	0
Lower round 1
B2	Sharks Esports	0
A2	FURIA Esports	2

Upper final
A1	INTZ eSports	0
B1	NRG Esports	2
Lower final
A1	INTZ eSports	1
A2	FURIA Esports	2

Qualified
B1	NRG Esports
A1	FURIA Esports

=== Europe Minor ===
The Europe Minor closed qualifier featured sixteen teams. No teams were invited to the Minor, but eight teams were invited to the closed qualifier while another eight teams came from four open qualifiers. The closed qualifier was a sixteen team, double elimination, best of three bracket. Notable teams such as Virtus.pro, OpTic Gaming, Heroic, and Windigo Gaming did not qualify for the Minor.

Teams

- CR4ZY (Closed #1–4)
- Fnatic (Closed #1–4)
- mousesports (Closed #1–4)
- North (Closed #1–4)
- BIG (Closed #5–8)
- NoChance (Closed #5–8)
- Sprout (Closed #5–8)
- Team Ancient (Closed #5–8)

Upper round 1
A1	Fnatic	0
B2	mousesports	2
B1	CR4ZY	0
A2	North	2
Lower round 1
A1	Fnatic	0
B1	CR4ZY	2

Upper final
B2	mousesports	2
A2	North	0
Lower final
A2	North	0
B1	CR4ZY	2

Qualified
B2	mousesports
B1	CR4ZY

=== Asia Minor ===
The Asia Minor will feature eight teams. Unlike the other Minors, the Asia Minor featured teams from six geographical regions. All qualifiers featured four invited teams with four more coming from two open qualifiers, except for the Greater China qualifier – which had sixteen teams, eight of which were invited – and the African qualifier – which had no invited teams. All qualifiers were a double elimination, best of three bracket.

Teams

- Grayhound Gaming (Oceania #1)
- Avant Gaming (Oceania #2)
- TYLOO (Greater China #1)
- 5Power Gaming (Greater China #2)
- MVP PK (East Asia)
- ALPHA Red (Southeast Asia)
- FFAmix (Middle East)
- Energy Esports (Africa)

Upper round 1
A1	Grayhound G.	2
B2	MVP PK	0
B1	TYLOO	2
A2	Avant Gaming	0
Lower round 1
B2	MVP PK	2
A2	Avant Gaming	0

Upper final
A1	Grayhound G.	2
B1	TYLOO	0
Lower final
B1	TYLOO	2
B2	MVP PK	0

Qualified
A1	Grayhound G
B1	TYLOO

=== CIS Minor ===
The CIS Minor will feature eight teams. The CIS closed qualifier featured the same format as the other Minor qualifiers. Notable teams such as Vega Squadron, pro100, and Winstrike Team failed to make it to the Minor.

Teams

- forZe (Closed #1–4)
- Nemiga Gaming (Closed #1–4)
- Syman Gaming (Closed #1–4)
- Team Spirit (Closed #1–4)
- DreamEaters (Closed #5–8)
- Gambit Youngsters (Closed #5–8)
- Unique Team (Closed #5–8)
- Warthox Esport (Closed #5–8)

Upper round 1
A1	forZe	2
B2	Team Spirit	0
B1	DreamEaters	1
A2	Syman Gaming	2
Lower round 1
B2	Team Spirit	0
B1	DreamEaters	2

Upper final
A1	forZe	2
A2	Syman Gaming	0
Lower final
A2	Syman Gaming	2
B1	DreamEaters	0

Qualified
A1	forZe
A2	Syman Gaming

=== Minor play-in ===
This qualifier featured the teams that placed third in their respective Minors. This phase was a four team, best of three, double elimination bracket. The opening matches were the Asia Minor representative against the Europe Minor representative and the CIS Minor team versus the Americans Minor team. After Cloud9 forfeited its spot by not fielding the majority of its lineup from the last Major, a third team would qualify from this qualifier.

Teams

- INTZ eSports (Americas #3)
- North (Europe #3)
- MVP PK (Asia #3)
- DreamEaters (CIS #3)

Upper round 1
EU	North	2
AS	MVP PK	0
AM	INTZ eSports	1
CIS	DreamEaters	2
Lower round 1
AS	MVP PK	0
AM	INTZ eSports	2

Qualified
EU	North
CIS	DreamEaters
Qualified
AM	INTZ eSports

== Broadcast talent ==
The Major was streamed in various languages across Twitch. It was also streamed on StarLadder's YouTube channel, Steam.tv, and on CS:GO's in-game viewing client GOTV.

Desk Hosts

- Tres "stunna" Saranthus
- Matthew "Sadokist" Trivett

Interviewers

- Sue "Smix" Lee
- James Banks

Analysts

- Chad "SPUNJ" Burchill
- Sean "seang@res" Gares
- Jacob "Pimp" Winneche
- Duncan "Thorin" Shields

Commentators

- Henry "HenryG" Greer
- Alex "Machine" Richardson
- Anders "Anders" Blume
- Jason "moses" O'Toole
- James "JFZB" Bardolph
- Daniel "ddk" Kapadia
- Harry "JustHarry" Russell
- Hugo Byron

== Teams competing ==
Legends

- Astralis
- ENCE
- MIBR
- Natus Vincere
- FaZe Clan
- Ninjas in Pyjamas
- Renegades
- Team Liquid

Katowice 2019 9th–14th

- AVANGAR
- HellRaisers
- Team Vitality
- Complexity Gaming
- G2 Esports

Regional Qualifiers

- forZe (CIS Minor #1)
- Syman Gaming (CIS Minor #2)
- mousesports (Europe Minor #1)
- CR4ZY (Europe Minor #2)
- Grayhound Gaming (Asia Minor #1)
- TYLOO (Asia Minor #2)
- NRG Esports (Americas Minor #1)
- FURIA Esports (Americas Minor #2)
- North (Play-in #1–2)
- DreamEaters (Play-in #1–2)
- INTZ eSports (Play-in #3)

== New Challengers stage ==
The New Challengers stage took place from August 23 to August 26, 2019, at the Verti Music Hall. The Challengers stage, also known as the Preliminary stage and formerly known as the offline qualifier, is a sixteen team swiss tournament. Initial seeding was determined using HLTV.org's world rankings from March 4 to August 12, 2019. Under each of the "Rounds" columns are the team's opponent's seed at the time the round was played, out of all teams still in the tournament.

Place	Team	Record	RD	Round 1	Round 2	Round 3	Round 4	Round 5
1–2	mousesports (6)	3–0	+13	forZe (11)	High match AVANGAR (6)	High match G2 Esports (2)	New Legends stage	New Legends stage
1–2	North (4)	3–0	+11	INTZ eSports (13)	High match Syman Gaming (14)	High match CR4ZY (6)	New Legends stage	New Legends stage
3–5	NRG Esports (2)	3–1	+39	DreamEaters (15)	Low match TYLOO (15)	Mid match Syman Gaming (14)	High match AVANGAR (7)	New Legends stage
3–5	G2 Esports (3)	3–1	+19	TYLOO (14)	High match DreamEaters (12)	High match mousesports (3)	High match forZe (7)	New Legends stage
3–5	CR4ZY (8)	3–1	+16	Grayhound Gaming (9)	High match FURIA Esports (4)	High match North (1)	High match DreamEaters (10)	New Legends stage
6–8	Team Vitality (1)	3–2	+25	Syman Gaming (16)	Low match INTZ eSports (16)	Mid match DreamEaters (13)	Low match HellRaisers (12)	Grayhound Gaming (10)
6–8	DreamEaters (15)	3–2	+1	NRG Esports (2)	High match G2 Esports (2)	Mid match Team Vitality (4)	Mid match CR4ZY (5)	forZe (9)
6–8	AVANGAR (7)	3–2	0	Complexity Gaming (10)	High match mouseports (5)	Mid match HellRaisers (10)	Mid match NRG Esports (4)	Syman Gaming (12)
9–11	Grayhound Gaming (9)	2–3	+10	CR4ZY (8)	Low match forZe (11)	Low match INTZ eSports (16)	Low match Complexity Gaming (10)	Team Vitality (6)
9–11	Syman Gaming (16)	2–3	−1	Team Vitality (1)	High match North (1)	Mid match NRG Esports (5)	Mid match FURIA Esports (8)	AVANGAR (7)
9–11	forZe (11)	2–3	−14	mousesports (7)	Low match Grayhound Gaming (10)	Mid match FURIA Esports (7)	Mid match G2 Esports (3)	DreamEaters (9)
12–14	Complexity Gaming (10)	1–3	−15	AVANGAR (7)	Low match HellRaisers (14)	Low match TYLOO (15)	Mid match Grayhound Gaming (12)	Eliminated
12–14	FURIA Esports (5)	1–3	−17	HellRaisers (12)	Low match CR4ZY (7)	Mid match forZe (8)	Low match Syman Gaming (14)	Eliminated
12–14	HellRaisers (12)	1–3	−20	FURIA Esports (5)	Low match Complexity Gaming (9)	Mid match AVANGAR (8)	Low match Team Vitality (7)	Eliminated
15–16	TYLOO (14)	0–3	−31	G2 Esports (3)	Low match NRG Esports (7)	Low match Complexity Gaming (12)	Eliminated	Eliminated
15–16	INTZ eSports (13)	0–3	−36	North (4)	Low match Team Vitality (3)	Low match Grayhound Gaming (11)	Eliminated	Eliminated

Round 1 scores

Round 1 matches
Team	Score	Map	Score	Team
Team Vitality	8	Dust2	16	Syman Gaming
NRG Esports	17	Overpass	19	Dreameaters
G2 Esports	16	Overpass	10	Tyloo
North	16	Train	5	INTZ
FURIA	16	Inferno	6	Hellraisers
mousesports	16	Inferno	6	forZe
AVANGAR	16	Inferno	13	compLexity Gaming
CR4ZY	16	Nuke	13	Grayhound Gaming

Round 2 scores

Round 2 matches
Team	Score	Map	Score	Team
North	16	Train	14	Syman Gaming
NRG Esports	16	Train	7	Tyloo
G2 Esports	16	Overpass	9	Dreameaters
Team Vitality	16	Mirage	9	INTZ
mousesports	19	Inferno	17	AVANGAR
compLexity Gaming	5	Inferno	16	Hellraisers
FURIA	11	Train	16	CR4ZY
Grayhound Gaming	9	Train	16	forZe

Round 3 scores

Round 3 matches
Team	Score	Map	Score	Team
Team Vitality	14	Inferno	16	Dreameaters
NRG Esports	16	Inferno	4	Syman Gaming
AVANGAR	16	Dust2	8	Hellraisers
FURIA	10	Nuke	16	forZe
compLexity Gaming	22	Overpass	20	Tyloo
compLexity Gaming	16	Vertigo	2	Tyloo
compLexity Gaming	–	Inferno	–	Tyloo
G2 Esports	16	Train	5	mousesports
G2 Esports	13	Dust2	16	mousesports
G2 Esports	7	Vertigo	16	mousesports
Grayhound Gaming	16	Train	5	INTZ
Grayhound Gaming	14	Nuke	16	INTZ
Grayhound Gaming	16	Dust2	7	INTZ
North	8	Mirage	16	CR4ZY
North	28	Inferno	26	CR4ZY
North	19	Train	15	CR4ZY

Round 4 scores

Round 4 matches
Team	Score	Map	Score	Team
G2 Esports	28	Dust2	25	forZe
G2 Esports	16	Inferno	12	forZe
G2 Esports	–	Overpass	–	forZe
FURIA	9	Train	16	Syman Gaming
FURIA	7	Inferno	16	Syman Gaming
FURIA	–	Overpass	–	Syman Gaming
compLexity Gaming	11	Dust2	16	Grayhound Gaming
compLexity Gaming	4	Inferno	16	Grayhound Gaming
compLexity Gaming	–	Overpass	–	Grayhound Gaming
NRG Esports	16	Train	8	AVANGAR
NRG Esports	16	Dust2	4	AVANGAR
NRG Esports	–	Overpass	–	AVANGAR
CR4ZY	12	Inferno	16	Dreameaters
CR4ZY	16	Dust2	11	Dreameaters
CR4ZY	16	Mirage	11	Dreameaters
Team Vitality	16	Inferno	8	Hellraisers
Team Vitality	16	Mirage	11	Hellraisers
Team Vitality	–	Overpass	–	Hellraisers

Round 5 scores

Round 5 matches
Team	Score	Map	Score	Team
AVANGAR	16	Inferno	10	Syman Gaming
AVANGAR	10	Mirage	16	Syman Gaming
AVANGAR	16	Dust2	5	Syman Gaming
forZe	10	Overpass	16	Dreameaters
forZe	12	Mirage	16	Dreameaters
forZe	–	Train	–	Dreameaters
Team Vitality	16	Dust2	5	Grayhound Gaming
Team Vitality	14	Overpass	16	Grayhound Gaming
Team Vitality	16	Inferno	14	Grayhound Gaming

== New Legends stage ==
The New Legends stage, formerly known as the Group stage, used the same format as the Challengers stage. This stage took place from August 28 to September 1, 2019, at the Verti Music Hall. Next to each team's name under the "Team" column is each team's initial seeding. Under each of the "Rounds" columns are the team's opponent's seed at the time the round was played.

Place	Team	Record	Round Difference	Round 1	Round 2	Round 3	Round 4	Round 5
1–2	ENCE	3–0	+34	AVANGAR (14)	High Match; MIBR (6)	High MatchTeam Vitality (4)	New Champions stage	New Champions stage
1–2	NRG Esports	3–0	+24	Renegades (8)	High Match; Team Liquid (2)	High MatchAstralis (1)	New Champions stage	New Champions stage
3–5	Team Vitality	3–1	+18	North (11)	High Match; FaZe Clan (4)	Middle MatchENCE (2)	High Match mousesports (11)	New Champions stage
3–5	Astralis	3–1	+15	Dreameaters (16)	High Match; G2 Esports (11)	Middle MatchNRG Esports (5)	High Match CR4ZY (12)	New Champions stage
3–5	AVANGAR	3–1	+1	ENCE (3)	Low Match; Renegades (8)	Middle MatchTeam Liquid (3)	High Match G2 Esports (9)	New Champions stage
6–8	Natus Vincere	3–2	+33	G2 Esports (13)	Low Match; Dreameaters (16)	Middle Matchmousesports (11)	Low Match MIBR (7)	CR4ZY (13)
6–8	Team Liquid	3–2	+14	CR4ZY (15)	High Match; NRG (8)	Middle MatchAVANGAR (14)	Low Match North (14)	mousesports (12)
6–8	Renegades	3–2	+8	NRG Esports (9)	Low Match; AVANGAR (14)	Middle MatchDreameaters (16)	Low Match FaZe Clan (6)	G2 Esports (11)
9–11	G2 Esports	2–3	−7	Natus Vincere (4)	High Match; Astralis (1)	Middle MatchMIBR (8)	High Match AVANGAR (10)	Renegades (10)
9–11	CR4ZY	2–3	−19	Team Liquid (2)	Low Match; Ninjas in Pyjamas (9)	Middle MatchFaZe Clan (6)	High Match Astralis (2)	Natus Vincere (6)
9–11	mousesports	2–3	−24	FaZe Clan (5)	Low Match; North (12)	Middle MatchNatus Vincere (7)	High Match Vitality (4)	Team Liquid (5)
12–14	FaZe Clan	1–3	0	mousesports (12)	High Match; Team Vitality (5)	Middle MatchCR4ZY (15)	Low Match Renegades (13)	Eliminated
12–14	North	1–3	−4	Team Vitality (6)	Low Match mousesports (13)	Low MatchNinjas in Pyjamas (12)	Low Match Team Liquid (5)	Eliminated
12–14	MIBR	1–3	−33	Ninjas in Pyjamas (10)	High Match; ENCE (3)	Middle MatchG2 Esports (9)	Low Match Natus Vincere (8)	Eliminated
15–16	Ninjas in Pyjamas	0–3	−30	MIBR (7)	Low Match; CR4ZY (15)	Low MatchNorth (13)	Eliminated	Eliminated
15–16	DreamEaters	0–3	−30	Astralis (1)	Low Match; Natus Vincere (7)	Low MatchRenegades (9)	Eliminated	Eliminated

Round 1 scores

Round 1 matches
Team	Score	Map	Score	Team
ENCE	16	Overpass	5	AVANGAR
Astralis	16	Dust2	9	Dreameaters
NRG Esports	16	Dust2	14	Renegades
Team Liquid	16	Mirage	9	CR4ZY
Team Vitality	16	Inferno	9	North
FaZe Clan	16	Mirage	8	mousesports
Natus Vincere	17	Overpass	19	G2 Esports
MIBR	16	Dust2	12	Ninjas in Pyjamas

Round 2 scores

Round 2 matches
Team	Score	Map	Score	Team
Renegades	13	Vertigo	16	AVANGAR
Natus Vincere	16	Overpass	7	Dreameaters
Ninjas in Pyjamas	10	Train	16	CR4ZY
North	13	Inferno	16	mousesports
Team Liquid	9	Dust2	16	NRG Esports
FaZe Clan	7	Dust2	16	Team Vitality
ENCE	16	Inferno	8	MIBR
Astralis	16	Nuke	7	G2 Esports

Round 3 scores

Round 3 matches
Team	Score	Map	Score	Team
Natus Vincere	17	Nuke	19	mousesports
Team Liquid	18	Overpass	22	AVANGAR
MIBR	4	Inferno	16	G2 Esports
FaZe Clan	9	Mirage	16	CR4ZY
ENCE	16	Nuke	10	Team Vitality
ENCE	16	Dust2	7	Team Vitality
ENCE	–	Mirage	–	Team Vitality
Renegades	16	Mirage	10	Dreameaters
Renegades	16	Train	8	Dreameaters
Renegades	–	Inferno	–	Dreameaters
Astralis	28	Train	31	NRG Esports
Astralis	4	Nuke	16	NRG Esports
Astralis	–	Overpass	–	NRG Esports
Ninjas in Pyjamas	8	Train	16	North
Ninjas in Pyjamas	4	Dust2	16	North
Ninjas in Pyjamas	–	Nuke	–	North

Round 4 scores

Round 4 matches
Team	Score	Map	Score	Team
G2 Esports	16	Dust2	9	AVANGAR
G2 Esports	11	Inferno	16	AVANGAR
G2 Esports	9	Overpass	16	AVANGAR
MIBR	11	Mirage	16	Natus Vincere
MIBR	4	Inferno	16	Natus Vincere
MIBR	–	Train	–	Natus Vincere
FaZe Clan	19	Mirage	22	Renegades
FaZe Clan	16	Nuke	4	Renegades
FaZe Clan	14	Vertigo	16	Renegades
Team Vitality	16	Vertigo	5	mousesports
Team Vitality	16	Mirage	10	mousesports

== New Champions stage ==
The New Champions Stage, also known as the Playoffs, is a best of three single elimination bracket. Teams play until a winner is decided. This stage took place between September 5 to September 8 at the Mercedes-Benz Arena. Brackets were revealed shortly after Natus Vincere defeated CR4ZY in the last map of the group stages. Teams were seeded first based on their record in the New Legends stage and based on the strength of their schedule. To the left of each team's name is their seed and to the right is their score.

=== Bracket ===
Quarterfinals
1	ENCE	5	12	–	0
8	Renegades	16	16	–	2
3	Team Vitality	9	16	10	1
5	AVANGAR	16	11	16	2
4	Astralis	16	16	–	2
7	Team Liquid	8	13	–	0
2	NRG Esports	16	19	–	2
6	Natus Vincere	12	17	–	0

Semifinals
8	Renegades	19	6	–	0
5	AVANGAR	22	16	–	2
4	Astralis	16	16	–	2
2	NRG Esports	10	9	–	0

Finals
5	AVANGAR	6	5	–	0
4	Astralis	16	16	–	2

=== Quarterfinals ===
==== ENCE vs. Renegades ====
Casters: James Bardolph & ddk

ENCE vs. Renegades scores
Team	Score	Map	Score	Team
ENCE	5	Mirage	16	Renegades
ENCE	12	Nuke	16	Renegades
ENCE	–	Dust II	–	Renegades

==== Team Vitality vs. AVANGAR ====
Casters: Anders & moses

Team Vitality vs. AVANGAR scores
Team	Score	Map	Score	Team
Team Vitality	9	Mirage	16	AVANGAR
Team Vitality	16	Inferno	11	AVANGAR
Team Vitality	10	Dust II	16	AVANGAR

==== NRG Esports vs. Natus Vincere ====
Casters: James Bardolph & ddk

NRG Esports vs. Natus Vincere scores
Team	Score	Map	Score	Team
NRG Esports	16	Dust II	12	Natus Vincere
NRG Esports	19	Mirage	17	Natus Vincere
NRG Esports	–	Nuke	–	Natus Vincere

==== Astralis vs. Team Liquid ====
Casters: Anders & moses

Astralis vs. Team Liquid scores
Team	Score	Map	Score	Team
Astralis	16	Vertigo	8	Team Liquid
Astralis	16	Overpass	13	Team Liquid
Astralis	–	Inferno	–	Team Liquid

=== Semifinals ===
==== Renegades vs. AVANGAR ====
Casters: James Bardolph & ddk

Renegades vs. AVANGAR scores
Team	Score	Map	Score	Team
Renegades	19	Mirage	22	AVANGAR
Renegades	6	Dust II	16	AVANGAR
Renegades	–	Train	–	AVANGAR

==== NRG Esports vs. Astralis ====
Casters: Anders & moses

NRG Esports vs. Astralis scores
Team	Score	Map	Score	Team
NRG Esports	10	Train	16	Astralis
NRG Esports	9	Overpass	16	Astralis
NRG Esports	–	Nuke	–	Astralis

=== Finals ===
==== AVANGAR vs. Astralis ====
Casters: Anders & moses

AVANGAR vs. Astralis scores
Team	Score	Map	Score	Team
AVANGAR	6	Inferno	16	Astralis
AVANGAR	5	Dust II	16	Astralis
AVANGAR	–	Overpass	–	Astralis

== Final standings ==
The final placings are shown below. In addition, the prize distribution, seed for the next major, roster, and coaches are shown. Each team's in-game leader is shown first.

Place	Prize Money	Team	Seed	Roster	Coach
1st	US$500,000	Astralis	Rio 2020 Legends	gla1ve, dev1ce, dupreeh, Magisk, Xyp9x	zonic
2nd	US$150,000	AVANGAR	Rio 2020 Legends	Jame, buster, qikert, Sanji, AdreN	dastan
3rd – 4th	US$70,000	Renegades	Rio 2020 Legends	jkaem, Gratisfaction, AZR, jks, Liazz	kassad
3rd – 4th	US$70,000	NRG Esports	Rio 2020 Legends	stanislaw, CeRq, Brehze, Ethan, tarik	ImAPet
5th – 8th	US$35,000	ENCE	Rio 2020 Legends	Aleksib, allu, sergej, Aerial, xseveN	Twista
5th – 8th	US$35,000	Team Vitality	Rio 2020 Legends	ALEX, apEX, NBK-, ZywOo, RpK	XTQZZZ
5th – 8th	US$35,000	Natus Vincere	Rio 2020 Legends	s1mple, Zeus, flamie, electronic, Boombl4	kane
5th – 8th	US$35,000	Team Liquid	Rio 2020 Legends	NAF, Twistzz, nitr0, EliGE, Stewie2K	adreN
9th – 11th	US$8,750	mousesports	Rio 2020 Challengers	ropz, karrigan, woxic, frozen, chrisJ	Rejin
9th – 11th	US$8,750	CR4ZY	Rio 2020 Challengers	EspiranTo, ottoNd, nexa, huNter-, LETN1	emi
9th – 11th	US$8,750	G2 Esports	Rio 2020 Challengers	shox, kennyS, Lucky, JaCkz, AmaNEk	maLeK
12th – 14th	US$8,750	MIBR	Rio 2020 Challengers	FalleN, zews, TACO, fer, LUCAS1	–
12th – 14th	US$8,750	FaZe Clan	Rio 2020 Challengers	NiKo, NEO, rain, olofmeister, GuardiaN	YNk
12th – 14th	US$8,750	North	Rio 2020 Challengers	valde, Kjaerbye, aizy, JUGi, gade	mithR
15th – 16th	US$8,750	Ninjas in Pyjamas	–	GeT RiGhT, f0rest, REZ, Lekr0, Plopski	pita
15th – 16th	US$8,750	Dreameaters	–	speed4k, kinqie, Forester, Krad, svyat	zoneR
17th – 19th	–	forZe	–	xsepower, Jerry, almazer, facecrack, FL1T	liTTle
17th – 19th	–	Grayhound Gaming	–	erkaSt, Sico, dexter, malta, Dickstacy	Neil_M
17th – 19th	–	Syman Gaming	–	neaLaN, Ramz1kBO$$, Perfecto, t0rick, Keoz	Solaar
20th – 22nd	–	FURIA Esports	–	arT, VINI, KSCERATO, yuurih, ableJ	guerri
20th – 22nd	–	HellRaisers	–	ANGE1, ISSAA, oskar, loWel, nukkye	–
20th – 22nd	–	Complexity Gaming	–	dephh, Rickeh, ShahZaM, SicK, oBo	keita
23rd – 24th	–	TYLOO	–	BnTeT, Freeman, Summer, somebody, Attacker	–
23rd – 24th	–	INTZ eSports	–	kNgV-, chelo, xand, DeStiNy, yeL	Apoka
