= IEM Katowice Major 2019 =

International tournament in Counter-Strike: Global Offensive

IEM Katowice 2019
- 2019
- The Intel Extreme Masters logo

Tournament information
- Sport: Counter-Strike: Global Offensive
- Location: Katowice, Silesian Voivodeship, Poland
- Dates: February 13–March 3, 2019
- Administrator: Valve; ESL
- Tournament format(s): Two 16 team swiss-system group stages 8 team single-elimination playoff
- Venue: ESL Arena; Katowice MCK; Spodek
- Teams: 24 teams
- Purse: $1,000,000 USD

Final positions
- Champions: Astralis (3rd title)
- 1st runners-up: ENCE
- 2nd runners-up: MIBR; Natus Vincere
- MVP: Emil "Magisk" Reif

The Intel Extreme Masters Season XIII – Katowice Major 2019, also known as IEM Katowice Major 2019 or Katowice 2019, was the fourteenth Counter-Strike: Global Offensive Major Championship and the world championship for the thirteenth season of the Intel Extreme Masters. It was held in Katowice, Silesian Voivodeship, Poland from February 13 – March 3, 2019. Fourteen teams would qualify for the IEM Katowice Major 2019 based on their top fourteen placements from the last Major, the FACEIT Major: London 2018, while another ten teams would qualify from their respective regional qualifiers. The top eight teams from the London Major ("Legends") received a bye to the second phase of the group stage while the other sixteen teams ("Challengers") had to go through the first and second group stages in order to reach the playoffs. It featured a US$1,000,000 prize pool, the seventh consecutive Major with that prize pool. It was hosted by ESL, their first Major since 2016. This event was the start of the second season of the Intel Grand Slam.

Astralis, Team Liquid, MIBR, Natus Vincere, and FaZe Clan were incoming Legends who retained that status, while BIG, HellRaisers, and compLexity Gaming were knocked out in the New Legends stage. Renegades, Ninjas in Pyjamas, and ENCE advanced to the playoff stage to become Legends for the following Major.

The grand finals featured the world's number one team Astralis, which defeated Ninjas in Pyjamas and MIBR in the playoffs, and the underdog ENCE, which defeated the world's number two in Team Liquid and the world's number three in Natus Vincere. Astralis swept ENCE in two maps to take its third Major title and tie Fnatic for most Majors titles. In addition, Astralis became just the third team after Fnatic and the Brazilian roster of Luminosity Gaming and SK Gaming to win consecutive Majors.

== Background ==
Counter-Strike: Global Offensive (CS:GO) is a multiplayer first-person shooter video game developed by Hidden Path Entertainment and Valve. It is the fourth game in the Counter-Strike series. In professional CS:GO, the Valve-sponsored Majors are the most prestigious tournaments.

The defending champions were Astralis, after winning their second championship at the FACEIT Major: London 2018. At the time, Fnatic had the most Major titles, with three.

== Format ==
The Major cycle began with four Minors, or regional qualifiers: Americas, Asia, CIS, and Europe. Two teams from each qualifier moved on to the Major. In addition, because Valve reduced the number of direct Major invites from sixteen to fourteen, the third-place teams at each respective Minor advanced to a third-place qualifier to send two more teams to the Major.

The Major featured twenty-four teams. The top eight teams from the FACEIT Major: London 2018 were the Legends, and the remaining sixteen teams—the teams that placed ninth through fourteenth at the FACEIT Major and the ten teams that advanced from the Minors—were known as Challengers.

The Major was split into three stages. The first stage was the New Challengers stage, featuring all Challengers in a Swiss-system tournament: the top eight teams advanced to the next stage and the bottom eight teams were eliminated. The second stage is the New Legends stage, a second Swiss-system group stage. This stage featured the eight Legends from the London Major and the eight teams advancing from the New Challengers stage. Like the New Challengers stage, the New Legends stage also advanced the top eight teams and eliminated the bottom eight teams. All teams from this stage except the bottom two teams earned automatic invites to the following Major. The final stage was the New Champions stage, and teams that advanced to this stage received Legends status at the following Major. This stage featured an eight team, best-of-three, single elimination bracket.

ESL announced changes for this Major in the New Challengers and the New Legends stages. Rather than only featuring best-of-threes in the fifth round of the group stages, ESL announced that any progression or elimination matches would feature a best-of-three series. Therefore, the high and low matches of round three and all matches in rounds four and five were best-of-three. ESL also made changes to the seeding protocol. Instead of having seeding determined by placement at the last Major and the Minors, each team in the Swiss-system stages ranked the other 15 teams in the stage; the rankings were then aggregated to create the final seeding for the first round of each Swiss-system stage. ESL also moved away from FACEIT's Buchholz system and instead used an Elo rating system. Teams were assigned Elo ratings that matched their seeding and the rating changed after every win or loss, with the winner taking some of the loser's points. Each team's Elo rating was used to determine all matchups after the first round, instead of the random draws of previous Majors.

=== Map Pool ===
The map pool remained the same as the previous Major.

Maps

- Cache
- Dust II
- Mirage
- Inferno
- Nuke
- Train
- Overpass

== Minors ==
Each regional qualifier, called "Minors", featured eight teams. Each Minor also had a US$50,000 prize pool, with first place receiving US$30,000, second place taking in US$15,000, and third place raking in the last US$5,000. Unlike past Minors, no teams was directly invited to the Minors. All Minors take place in Katowice to avoid visa issues, just like the FACEIT Major approach.

Each Minor's format was similar to past Minors, but with a couple small changes. The group stages would be a GSL, double elimination format with each group featuring four teams. The opening matches would be a best of one. A new change came along with the winner's set being a best of three instead of the usual best of one. The loser's and decider's matches would also be best of three sets. The top two teams in each group would move on to a four team, best of three, double elimination bracket. The top two teams would move on to the Major. In addition, the Minor finals that used to determine seeding would be eliminated; instead, the winner of the winner's match would be the first seed going into the New Challengers stage and the winner of the loser's match would be the second seed.

=== CIS Minor ===
The CIS Minor qualifier featured sixteen teams. Winstrike Team was automatically invited based on its top sixteen placement at the FACEIT Major and another seven teams were invited. Eight more teams qualified through four online qualifiers. The qualifier will have a sixteen team, double elimination bracket and teams will play until eight teams qualified CIS Minor.

The CIS Minor took place from January 16 to 20, 2019.

Teams

- AVANGAR (Closed #1–4)
- Nemiga Gaming (Closed #1–4)
- Team Spirit (Closed #1–4)
- Winstrike Team (Closed #1–4)
- Gambit Esports (Closed #5–8)
- pro100 (Closed #5–8)
- Syman Gaming (Closed #5–8)
- Runtime.gg (Closed #5–8)

Upper round 1
A1 | Team Spirit | 0
B2 | AVANGAR | 2
B1 | Winstrike Team | 2
A2 | Gambit Esports | 1
Lower round 1
A1 | Team Spirit | 2
A2 | Gambit Esports | 0

Upper final
B2 | AVANGAR | 2
B1 | Winstrike Team | 1
Lower final
B1 | Winstrike Team | 1
A1 | Team Spirit | 2

Qualified
B2 | AVANGAR
A1 | Team Spirit

=== Europe Minor ===
The Europe Minor qualifier featured sixteen teams. mousesports were automatically invited based on their top sixteen placement at the FACEIT Major and another seven teams were invited. Eight more teams qualified through four online qualifiers. The qualifier had a sixteen team, double elimination bracket and teams played until eight teams qualified for the Europe Minor.

The Europe Minor took place from January 16 to 20, 2019. ENCE and Team Vitality qualified for the main qualifier.

Teams

- mousesports (Closed #1–4)
- North (Closed #1–4)
- OpTic Gaming (Closed #1–4)
- Windigo Gaming (Closed #1–4)
- ENCE (Closed #5–8)
- ex-Space Soldiers (Closed #5–8)
- Team Vitality (Closed #5–8)
- Valiance (Closed #5–8)

Upper round 1
A1 | Team Vitality | 0
B2 | North | 2
B1 | ENCE | 2
A2 | Valiance | 1
Lower round 1
A1 | Team Vitality | 2
A2 | Valiance | 1

Upper final
B2 | North | 0
B1 | ENCE | 2
Lower final
B2 | North | 1
A1 | Team Vitality | 2

Qualified
B1 | ENCE
A1 | Team Vitality

=== Asia Minor ===
The Asia Minor featured two teams from Oceania, two teams from China, two teams from East Asia, one team from Southeast Asia, and one team from the Middle East. Each qualifier featured four invited teams and another four teams through two online qualifiers. Each qualifier consist of an eight team, double elimination, best of three bracket. MVP PK was the first team to qualify for any Katowice 2019 Minor after defeating compatriot GOSU and Renegades rounded up the Asia Minor lineup after defeating Tainted Minds.

The Asia Minor will take place from January 22 to 26, 2019.

Teams

- Grayhound Gaming (Oceania #1)
- Renegades (Oceania #2)
- ViCi Gaming (China #1)
- CyberZen (China #2)
- MVP PK (East Asia #1)
- GOSU (East Asia #2)
- Beyond Esports (Southeast Asia)
- Aequus Club (Middle East)

Upper round 1
A1 | Renegades | 2
B2 | ViCi Gaming | 1
B1 | MVP PK | 1
A2 | Grayhound G. | 2
Lower round 1
B2 | ViCi Gaming | 2
B1 | MVP PK | 0

Upper final
A1 | Renegades | 2
A2 | Grayhound G. | 1
Lower final
A2 | Grayhound G. | 2
B2 | ViCi Gaming | 1

Qualified
A1 | Renegades
A2 | Grayhound G.

=== Americas Minor ===
The Americas Minor featured two qualifiers, one from North America and one from South America. The North America qualifier featured sixteen teams. Eight teams were invited and another eight teams qualified through four online qualifiers. The qualifier would have a sixteen team, double elimination bracket and teams would play until six teams qualified for the Americas Minor. The South America qualifier featured eight teams. Four teams were invited and another four teams qualified through two online qualifiers. This qualifier have an eight team, double elimination, best of three bracket. Teams would play until two teams qualified for the Minor.

The Americas Minor took place from January 22 to 26, 2019, the same dates as the Asia Minor.

Teams

- eUnited (NA #1–4)
- FURIA Esports (NA #1–4)
- NRG Esports (NA #1–4)
- Team Envy (NA #1–4)
- Bravado Gaming (NA #5–6)
- Team One (NA #5–6)
- INTZ eSports (SA #1)
- Imperial e-Sports (SA #2)

Upper round 1
A1 | NRG Esports | 2
B2 | Team Envy | 0
B1 | FURIA Esports | 2
A2 | INTZ eSports | 1
Lower round 1
B2 | Team Envy | 2
A2 | INTZ eSports | 1

Upper final
A1 | NRG Esports | 2
B1 | FURIA Esports | 0
Lower final
B1 | FURIA Esports | 2
B2 | Team Envy | 0

Qualified
A1 | NRG Esports
B1 | FURIA Esports

=== Minor play-in ===
This qualifier featured the teams that placed third in their respective Minors. This phase was a four team, best of three, double elimination bracket. The opening matches were the Asia Minor representative against the Europe Minor representative and the CIS Minor team versus the Americans Minor team.

The Minor play-in took place on January 27, 2019.

Teams

- Winstrike Team
- North
- ViCi Gaming
- Team Envy

Upper round 1
AS | ViCi Gaming | 1
EU | North | 0
CIS | Winstrike Team | 1
AM | Team Envy | 0
Lower round 1
EU | North | 2
AM | Team Envy | 0

Upper final
AS | ViCi Gaming | 0
CIS | Winstrike Team | 1
Lower final
AS | ViCi Gaming | 2
EU | North | 0

Qualified
CIS | Winstrike Team
AS | ViCi Gaming

== Broadcast talent ==
The Major was streamed in various languages across Twitch. It was also streamed on ESL's YouTube channel, Steam.tv, and on CS:GO's in-game viewing client GOTV.

Desk hosts

- Alex "Machine" Richardson
- Tres "stunna" Saranthus

Stage host

- OJ Borg

Reporter

- Frankie Ward

Commentators

- Henry "HenryG" Greer
- Vince Hill
- Jason "moses" O'Toole
- Matthew "Sadokist" Trivett

Analysts

- Chad "SPUNJ" Burchill
- Sean "seang@res" Gares
- Jacob "Pimp" Winneche

Observers

- Connor "Sliggy" Blomfield
- Heather "sapphiRe" Garozzo
- David "Prius" Kuntz
- Alex "Rushly" Rush

== Teams competing ==
Legends

- Astralis
- Natus Vincere
- MIBR
- Team Liquid
- BIG
- compLexity Gaming
- FaZe Clan
- HellRaisers

London 2018 9th–14th

- Fnatic
- G2 Esports
- Ninjas in Pyjamas
- Cloud9
- TyLoo
- Vega Squadron

Regional Qualifiers

- AVANGAR (CIS Minor #1)
- Team Spirit (CIS Minor #2)
- ENCE (Europe Minor #1)
- Team Vitality (Europe Minor #2)
- Renegades (Asia Minor #1)
- Grayhound Gaming (Asia Minor #2)
- NRG Esports (Americas Minor #1)
- FURIA Esports (Americas Minor #2)
- Winstrike Team (Play-in #1)
- ViCi Gaming (Play-in #2)

=== Pre-Major ranking ===
HLTV.org rank teams based on results of teams' performances. The rankings shown below reflect the February 11, 2019 rankings.

Teams that were in the top 30 but failed to qualify for the major include North (#7, Denmark), mousesports (#10, Europe), Ghost Gaming (#16, United States), Valiance (#20, Serbia), 3DMAX (#24, France), Heroic (#25, Denmark), forZe (#26, Russia), Luminosity Gaming (#27, Brazil), Sprout Esports (#29, Germany), and x6tence Galaxy (#30, Sweden).

HLTV.org pre-major ranking

World ranking
| Place | Team | Points | Move^{1} | Peak^{2} | Low^{2} | Best Major placing^{3} | Best achievements^{2} |
|---|---|---|---|---|---|---|---|
| 1 | Astralis | 933 | Steady | 1 | 1 | 1st at Atlanta 2017; 1st at London 2018 | IEM Chicago 2018 winner ECS Season 6 winner ESL Pro League Season 8 winner |
| 2 | Team Liquid | 576 | ▲1 | 2 | 3 | 2nd at Cologne 2016 | IEM Chicago 2018 runner-up ESL One New York runner-up ESL Pro League Season 8 runner-up |
| 3 | Natus Vincere | 384 | ▼1 | 2 | 3 | 2nd at Cluj-Napoca 2015; 2nd at Columbus 2016; 2nd at London 2018 | BLAST Copenhagen winner EPICENTER 2018 runner-up |
| 4 | FaZe Clan | 4327 | ▲1 | 4 | 8 | 2nd at Boston 2018 | EPICENTER 2018 winner 3rd at IEM Chicago 2018; ELEAGUE Invitational 2019 winner |
| 5 | NRG Esports | 265 | Steady | 5 | 10 | 1st at Katowice 2019 Americas Minor | cs_summit 3 winner 3rd at ESL One New York 2018; 3rd at SL iL Season 6 |
| 6 | Fnatic | 265 | Steady | 5 | 26 | 1st at Winter 2013; 1st at Katowice 2015; 1st Cologne 2015 | PLG Grand Slam 2018 winner 3rd at IEM Chicago 2018 |
| 8 | Cloud9 | 208 | ▲13 | 7 | 29 | 1st at Boston 2018 | 3rd at BLAST Lisbon 2018; ELEAGUE Invitational 2019 runner-up |
| 9 | MIBR | 187 | ▼5 | 4 | 9 | 1st at Columbus 2016; 1st at Cologne 2016 | ECS Season 6 runner-up BLAST Istanbul 2018 runner-up |
| 11 | ENCE | 182 | ▲6 | 10 | 20 | 1st at Katowice 2019 Europe Minor | DreamHack Winter 2018 winner SL iL Season 6 winner |
| 12 | BIG | 178 | ▼4 | 7 | 15 | 5th at Kraków 2017; 5th at London 2018 | 5th at SL iL Season 6; 3rd at cs_summit 3 |
| 13 | Renegades | 166 | ▲10 | 11 | 30 | 9th at Cologne 2015 | 5th at SL iL Season 6; 3rd at Toyota Masters Bangkok 2018 |
| 14 | Ninjas in Pyjamas | 163 | ▲5 | 6 | 14 | 1st at Cologne 2014 | BLAST Copenhagen runner-up 5th at EPICENTER 2018 |
| 15 | Team Vitality | 162 | N/A | 14 | 45 | 2nd at Katowice 2019 Europe Minor | DreamHack Atlanta 2018 winner |
| 17 | Team Spirit | 115 | ▲17 | 17 | 56 | 17th at London 2018 | 5th at WePlay! Lock and Load |
| 18 | AVANGAR | 114 | ▲15 | 15 | 31 | 17th at Boston 2018 | 3rd at EPICENTER 2018; Qi Invitational runner-up |
| 19 | G2 Esports | 109 | ▼4 | 4 | 25 | 5th at Boston 2018 | 5th at ESL One New York 2018; 7th at ESL Pro League Season 8 |
| 21 | HellRaisers | 101 | ▼11 | 10 | 21 | 5th at London 2018 | 5th at EPICENTER 2018 |
| 22 | Grayhound Gaming | 82 | ▲23 | 22 | 68 | 2nd at Katowice 2019 Asia Minor | 3rd at ESEA Season 29; 9th at PLG Grand Slam |
| 23 | FURIA Esports | 80 | ▲56 | 21 | 85 | 2nd at Katowice 2018 Americas Minor | 5th at WePlay! Lock and Load |
| 28 | Winstrike Team | 178 | ▲276 | 27 | 304 | 1st at Katowice 2019 play-in | 9th at WePlay! Lock and Load |
| 35 | ViCi Gaming | – | ▲110 | 35 | 145 | 2nd at Katowice 2019 play-in | 13th at ESL Pro League Season 8 |
| 39 | compLexity Gaming | – | ▼18 | 11 | 39 | 5th at London 2018 | 3rd at DreamHack Atlanta 2018; 4th at cs_summit 3 |
| 53 | Vega Squadron | – | ▲13 | 13 | 53 | 9th at Boston 2018 | SL iL Season 6 runner-up |
| 67 | TyLoo | – | ▼55 | 12 | 67 | 12th at London 2018 | DreamHack Open Austin 2018 runner-up |

^{1}Change since September 24, 2018 ranking, the ranking after the FACEIT Major.

^{2}Since end of FACEIT Major

^{3}Best major placements may not necessarily reflect teams' current rosters

== New Challengers stage ==
The New Challengers stage took place from February 13 to February 17, 2019, at the ESL Arena. The Challengers stage, also known as the Preliminary stage and formerly known as the offline qualifier, was a sixteen team swiss tournament. The seeding was released on February 6, 2019. Next to each team's name under the "Team" column is each team's initial seeding. Under each of the "Rounds" columns are the team's opponent's seed at the time the round was played.

| Place | Team | Record | RD | Round 1 | Round 2 | Round 3 | Round 4 | Round 5 |
|---|---|---|---|---|---|---|---|---|
| 1–2 | NRG Esports (2) | 3–0 | +22 | Winstrike Team (15); 16–9; Nuke | High match ViCi Gaming (12); 16–6; Overpass | High match TyLoo (6); 2–0 | New Legends stage | New Legends stage |
| 1–2 | Renegades (9) | 3–0 | +22 | AVANGAR (8); 16–8; Train | High match Ninjas in Pyjamas (3); 16–13; Mirage | High match ENCE (2); 2–0 | New Legends stage | New Legends stage |
| 3–5 | Team Vitality (6) | 3–1 | +16 | TyLoo (11); 8–16; Inferno | Low match Grayhound Gaming (15); 19–17; Nuke | Mid match Vega Squadron (11); 16–1; Overpass | High match ViCi Gaming (11); 2–0 | New Legends stage |
| 3–5 | AVANGAR (8) | 3–1 | +6 | Renegades (9); 8–16; Train | Low match FURIA Esports (14); 16–14; Mirage | Mid match G2 Esports (7); 16–10; Overpass | High match TyLoo (7); 2–0 | New Legends stage |
| 3–5 | ENCE eSports (5) | 3–1 | +4 | Team Spirit (12); 16–10; Nuke | High match G2 Esports (6); 16–6; Overpass | High match Renegades (5); 0–2 | High match Winstrike Team (12); 2–1 | New Legends stage |
| 6–8 | Ninjas in Pyjamas (4) | 3–2 | +20 | FURIA Esports (13); 16–6; Mirage | High match Renegades (8); 13–16; Mirage | Mid match Winstrike Team (13); 6–16; Train | Low match Vega Squadron (13); 2–1 | ViCi Gaming (11); 2–1 |
| 6–8 | G2 Esports (7) | 3–2 | +16 | Vega Squadron (10); 16–14; Cache | High match ENCE eSports (4); 6–16; Overpass | Mid match AVANGAR (10); 16–10; Overpass | Low match Fnatic (10); 2–1 | TyLoo (10); 2–1 |
| 6–8 | Cloud9 (3) | 3–2 | 0 | Grayhound Gaming (14); 16–11; Mirage | High match TyLoo (9); 3–16; Overpass | Mid match ViCi Gaming (12); 6–16; Inferno | Low match FURIA Esports (14); 2–1 | Winstrike Team (8); 2–0 |
| 9–11 | Winstrike Team (15) | 2–3 | −3 | NRG Esports (2); 9–16; Nuke | Low match Fnatic (5); 16–11; Train | Mid match Ninjas in Pyjamas (3); 16–6; Train | High match ENCE eSports (3); 1–2 | Cloud9 (9); 0–2 |
| 9–11 | TyLoo (11) | 2–3 | −9 | Team Vitality (6); 16–8; Inferno | High match Cloud9 (2); 16–3; Overpass | High match NRG Esports (1); 0–2 | High match AVANGAR (8); 0–2 | G2 Esports (7); 1–2 |
| 9–11 | ViCi Gaming (16) | 2–3 | −12 | Fnatic (1); 16–9; Train | High match NRG Esports (1); 6–16; Overpass | Mid match Cloud9 (4); 16–6; Inferno | High match Team Vitality (5); 0–2 | Ninjas in Pyjamas (6); 1–2 |
| 12–14 | FURIA Esports (13) | 1–3 | −9 | Ninjas in Pyjamas (4); 6–16; Mirage | Low match AVANGAR (10); 14–16; Mirage | Low match Team Spirit (14); 2–0 | Low match Cloud9 (14); 1–2 | Eliminated |
| 12–14 | Fnatic (1) | 1–3 | −11 | ViCi Gaming (16); 9–16; Overpass | Low match Winstrike Team (16); 11–16; Train | Low match Grayhound Gaming (16); 2–0 | Low match G2 Esports (9); 1–2 | Eliminated |
| 12–14 | Vega Squadron (10) | 1–3 | −26 | G2 Esports (7); 14–16; Cache | Low match Team Spirit (13); 16–14; Mirage | Mid match Team Vitality (8); 1–16; Overpass | Low match Ninjas in Pyjamas (6); 1–2 | Eliminated |
| 15–16 | Team Spirit (12) | 0–3 | −17 | ENCE eSports (5); 10–16; Nuke | Low match Vega Squadron (11); 14–16; Mirage | Low match FURIA Esports (15); 0–2 | Eliminated | Eliminated |
| 15–16 | Grayhound Gaming (14) | 0–3 | −19 | Cloud9 (3); 11–16; Mirage | Low match Team Vitality (7); 17–19; Nuke | Low match Fnatic (9); 0–2 | Eliminated | Eliminated |

Round 3 scores

Round 3 matches
| Team | Score | Map | Score | Team |
|---|---|---|---|---|
| ENCE eSports | 7 | Nuke | 16 | Renegades |
| ENCE eSports | 14 | Mirage | 16 | Renegades |
| ENCE eSports | – | Inferno | – | Renegades |
| Fnatic | 16 | Inferno | 9 | Grayhound Gaming |
| Fnatic | 16 | Overpass | 11 | Grayhound Gaming |
| Fnatic | – | Mirage | – | Grayhound Gaming |
| NRG Esports | 16 | Inferno | 14 | TyLoo |
| NRG Esports | 16 | Mirage | 13 | TyLoo |
| NRG Esports | – | Train | – | TyLoo |
| Team Spirit | 9 | Mirage | 16 | FURIA Esports |
| Team Spirit | 14 | Nuke | 16 | FURIA Esports |
| Team Spirit | – | Cache | – | FURIA Esports |

Round 4 scores

Round 4 matches
| Team | Score | Map | Score | Team |
|---|---|---|---|---|
| Team Vitality | 25 | Inferno | 22 | ViCi Gaming |
| Team Vitality | 16 | Nuke | 12 | ViCi Gaming |
| Team Vitality | – | Overpass | – | ViCi Gaming |
| TyLoo | 12 | Cache | 16 | AVANGAR |
| TyLoo | 14 | Inferno | 16 | AVANGAR |
| TyLoo | – | Mirage | – | AVANGAR |
| ENCE eSports | 16 | Dust II | 11 | Winstrike Team |
| ENCE eSports | 7 | Mirage | 16 | Winstrike Team |
| ENCE eSports | 16 | Train | 13 | Winstrike Team |
| Ninjas in Pyjamas | 17 | Overpass | 19 | Vega Squadron |
| Ninjas in Pyjamas | 16 | Train | 6 | Vega Squadron |
| Ninjas in Pyjamas | 16 | Mirage | 6 | Vega Squadron |
| G2 Esports | 8 | Mirage | 16 | Fnatic |
| G2 Esports | 16 | Dust II | 8 | Fnatic |
| G2 Esports | 16 | Overpass | 5 | Fnatic |
| Cloud9 | 1 | Mirage | 16 | FURIA Esports |
| Cloud9 | 16 | Inferno | 1 | FURIA Esports |
| Cloud9 | 16 | Cache | 10 | FURIA Esports |

Round 5 scores

Round 5 matches
| Team | Score | Map | Score | Team |
|---|---|---|---|---|
| Ninjas in Pyjamas | 16 | Train | 7 | ViCi Gaming |
| Ninjas in Pyjamas | 13 | Inferno | 16 | ViCi Gaming |
| Ninjas in Pyjamas | 16 | Mirage | 7 | ViCi Gaming |
| G2 Esports | 12 | Mirage | 16 | TyLoo |
| G2 Esports | 16 | Dust II | 2 | TyLoo |
| G2 Esports | 16 | Cache | 7 | TyLoo |
| Cloud9 | 16 | Nuke | 7 | Winstrike Team |
| Cloud9 | 19 | Overpass | 16 | Winstrike Team |
| Cloud9 | – | Mirage | – | Winstrike Team |

== New Legends stage ==
The New Legends stage, formerly known as the Group stage, used the same format as the Challengers stage. This stage takes place from February 20 to February 24, 2019, live at the International Congress Center in Katowice. The seeding was released on February 19, 2019. Next to each team's name under the "Team" column is each team's initial seeding. Under each of the "Rounds" columns are the team's opponent's seed at the time the round was played.

| Place | Team | Record | RD | Round 1 | Round 2 | Round 3 | Round 4 | Round 5 |
|---|---|---|---|---|---|---|---|---|
| 1–2 | Astralis (1) | 3–0 | +45 | compLexity Gaming (16); 16–6; Nuke | High match Cloud9 (12); 16–0; Train | High match Renegades (8); 2–1 | New Champions stage | New Champions stage |
| 1–2 | Team Liquid (2) | 3–0 | +16 | AVANGAR (15); 16–12; Overpass | High match Ninjas in Pyjamas (10); 16–13; Overpass | High match Natus Vincere (3); 2–0 | New Champions stage | New Champions stage |
| 3–5 | Natus Vincere (3) | 3–1 | +18 | G2 Esports (14); 16–7; Inferno | High match Team Vitality (11); 25–22; Mirage | High match Team Liquid (2); 0–2 | High match AVANGAR (10); 2–0 | New Champions stage |
| 3–5 | MIBR (4) | 3–1 | +10 | Cloud9 (13); 3–16; Inferno | Low match compLexity Gaming (16); 16–9; Mirage | Mid match G2 Esports (14); 16–12; Inferno | High match Ninjas in Pyjamas (8); 2–0 | New Champions stage |
| 3–5 | Renegades (9) | 3–1 | −4 | ENCE eSports (8); 16–13; Inferno | High match FaZe Clan (4); 16–14; Inferno | High match Astralis (1); 1–2 | High match Team Vitality (7); 2–1 | New Champions stage |
| 6–8 | FaZe Clan (5) | 3–2 | +15 | HellRaisers (12); 16–4; Train | High match Renegades (8); 14–16; Inferno | Mid match AVANGAR (15); 13–16; Mirage | Low match compLexity Gaming (14); 2–1 | Cloud9 (11); 2–0 |
| 6–8 | ENCE eSports (8) | 3–2 | +11 | Renegades (9); 13–16; Inferno | Low match HellRaisers (13); 12–16; Dust II | Low match BIG (7); 2–1 | Low match G2 Esports (14); 2–0 | AVANGAR (10); 2–0 |
| 6–8 | Ninjas in Pyjamas (11) | 3–2 | +8 | NRG Esports (6); 16–14; Nuke | High match Team Liquid (2); 13–16; Overpass | Mid match HellRaisers (13); 16–5; Overpass | High match MIBR (4); 0–2 | Team Vitality (9); 2–1 |
| 9–11 | Cloud9 (13) | 2–3 | −2 | MIBR (4); 16–3; Inferno | High match Astralis (1); 0–16; Train | Mid match Team Vitality (11); 14–16; Mirage | Low match HellRaisers (12); 2–0 | FaZe Clan (6); 0–2 |
| 9–11 | Team Vitality (10) | 2–3 | −16 | BIG (7); 16–11; Mirage | High match Natus Vincere (3); 22–25; Mirage | Mid match Cloud9 (12); 16–14; Mirage | High match Renegades (5); 1–2 | Ninjas in Pyjamas (8); 1–2 |
| 9–11 | AVANGAR (15) | 2–3 | −26 | Team Liquid (2); 12–16; Overpass | Low match NRG Sports (6); 16–13; Overpass | Mid match FaZe Clan (4); 16–13; Mirage | High match Natus Vincere (3); 0–2 | ENCE eSports (7); 0–2 |
| 12–14 | compLexity Gaming (16) | 1–3 | −10 | Astralis (1); 6–16; Nuke | Low match MIBR (5); 9–16; Mirage | Low match NRG Esports (6); 2–0 | Low match FaZe Clan (6); 1–2 | Eliminated |
| 12–14 | G2 Esports (14) | 1–3 | −18 | Natus Vincere (3); 7–16; Inferno | Low match BIG (7); 16–13; Mirage | Mid match MIBR (5); 12–16; Inferno | Low match ENCE eSports (8); 2–0 | Eliminated |
| 12–14 | HellRaisers (12) | 1–3 | −31 | FaZe Clan (5); 4–16; Train | Low match ENCE eSports (9); 16–12; Dust II | Mid match Ninjas in Pyjamas (10); 5–16; Overpass | Low match Cloud9 (11); 0–2 | Eliminated |
| 15–16 | BIG (7) | 0–3 | −5 | Team Vitality (10); 11–16; Mirage | Low match G2 Esports (14); 13–16; Mirage | Low match ENCE eSports (9); 1–2 | Eliminated | Eliminated |
| 15–16 | NRG Esports (6) | 0–3 | −11 | Ninjas in Pyjamas (11); 14–16; Nuke | Low match AVANGAR (15); 13–16; Overpass | Low match compLexity Gaming (16); 0–2 | Eliminated | Eliminated |

Round 3 scores

Round 3 matches
| Team | Score | Map | Score | Team |
|---|---|---|---|---|
| Astralis | 17 | Mirage | 19 | Renegades |
| Astralis | 16 | Nuke | 9 | Renegades |
| Astralis | 16 | Inferno | 2 | Renegades |
| ENCE eSports | 5 | Dust II | 16 | BIG |
| ENCE eSports | 16 | Train | 14 | BIG |
| ENCE eSports | 16 | Overpass | 10 | BIG |
| Team Liquid | 16 | Mirage | 14 | Natus Vincere |
| Team Liquid | 16 | Dust II | 9 | Natus Vincere |
| Team Liquid | – | Nuke | – | Natus Vincere |
| NRG Esports | 19 | Nuke | 22 | compLexity Gaming |
| NRG Esports | 16 | Cache | 19 | compLexity Gaming |
| NRG Esports | – | Inferno | – | compLexity Gaming |

Round 4 scores

Round 4 matches
| Team | Score | Map | Score | Team |
|---|---|---|---|---|
| Renegades | 16 | Dust II | 5 | Team Vitality |
| Renegades | 11 | Cache | 16 | Team Vitality |
| Renegades | 16 | Inferno | 12 | Team Vitality |
| Natus Vincere | 16 | Dust II | 6 | AVANGAR |
| Natus Vincere | 16 | Train | 11 | AVANGAR |
| Natus Vincere | – | Mirage | – | AVANGAR |
| MIBR | 16 | Train | 6 | Ninjas in Pyjamas |
| MIBR | 16 | Inferno | 14 | Ninjas in Pyjamas |
| MIBR | – | Mirage | – | Ninjas in Pyjamas |
| ENCE eSports | 19 | Dust II | 17 | G2 Esports |
| ENCE eSports | 16 | Mirage | 10 | G2 Esports |
| ENCE eSports | – | Nuke | – | G2 Esports |
| FaZe Clan | 8 | Cache | 16 | compLexity Gaming |
| FaZe Clan | 16 | Mirage | 11 | compLexity Gaming |
| FaZe Clan | 16 | Dust II | 14 | compLexity Gaming |
| Cloud9 | 16 | Inferno | 8 | HellRaisers |
| Cloud9 | 16 | Cache | 12 | HellRaisers |
| Cloud9 | – | Mirage | – | HellRaisers |

Round 5 scores

Round 5 matches
| Team | Score | Map | Score | Team |
|---|---|---|---|---|
| ENCE eSports | 16 | Mirage | 12 | AVANGAR |
| ENCE eSports | 16 | Train | 7 | AVANGAR |
| ENCE eSports | – | Overpass | – | AVANGAR |
| Ninjas in Pyjamas | 16 | Cache | 7 | Team Vitality |
| Ninjas in Pyjamas | 8 | Overpass | 16 | Team Vitality |
| Ninjas in Pyjamas | 16 | Mirage | 7 | Team Vitality |
| FaZe Clan | 16 | Cache | 14 | Cloud9 |
| FaZe Clan | 16 | Dust II | 9 | Cloud9 |
| FaZe Clan | – | Nuke | – | Cloud9 |

== New Champions stage ==
The New Champions Stage, also known as the Playoffs, is a best of three double elimination bracket. Teams play until a winner is decided. This stage is taking place at the Spodek from February 28 to March 3, 2019. Brackets were revealed shortly after FaZe defeated Cloud9 in the last map of the group stages. Teams were seeded first based on their record in the New Legends stage and based on the strength of their schedule.

=== Bracket ===
Quarterfinals
1 | Astralis | 16 | 16 | – | 2
8 | Ninjas in Pyjamas | 2 | 14 | – | 0
4 | MIBR | 16 | 16 | – | 2
5 | Renegades | 6 | 12 | – | 0
3 | Natus Vincere | 16 | 16 | – | 2
6 | FaZe Clan | 13 | 7 | – | 0
2 | Team Liquid | 11 | 16 | – | 0
7 | ENCE | 16 | 19 | – | 2

Semifinals
1 | Astralis | 16 | 16 | – | 2
4 | MIBR | 14 | 7 | – | 0
3 | Natus Vincere | 14 | 16 | 14 | 1
7 | ENCE | 16 | 3 | 16 | 2

Finals
1 | Astralis | 16 | 16 | – | 2
7 | ENCE | 11 | 4 | – | 0

=== Quarterfinals ===
==== Natus Vincere vs. FaZe Clan ====
Casters: HenryG & Sadokist

Natus Vincere vs. FaZe Clan scores
| Team | Score | Map | Score | Team |
|---|---|---|---|---|
| Natus Vincere | 16 | Inferno | 13 | FaZe Clan |
| Natus Vincere | 16 | Mirage | 7 | FaZe Clan |
| Natus Vincere | – | Dust II | – | FaZe Clan |

==== Team Liquid vs. ENCE eSports ====
Casters: Vince Hill & moses

Team Liquid vs. ENCE eSports scores
| Team | Score | Map | Score | Team |
|---|---|---|---|---|
| Team Liquid | 11 | Mirage | 16 | ENCE eSports |
| Team Liquid | 16 | Inferno | 19 | ENCE eSports |
| Team Liquid | – | Overpass | – | ENCE eSports |

==== MIBR vs. Renegades ====
Casters: HenryG & Sadokist

MIBR vs. Renegades scores
| Team | Score | Map | Score | Team |
|---|---|---|---|---|
| MIBR | 16 | Dust II | 6 | Renegades |
| MIBR | 16 | Train | 12 | Renegades |
| MIBR | – | Mirage | – | Renegades |

==== Astralis vs. Ninjas in Pyjamas ====
Casters: Vince Hill & moses

Astralis vs. Ninjas in Pyjamas scores
| Team | Score | Map | Score | Team |
|---|---|---|---|---|
| Astralis | 16 | Mirage | 2 | Ninjas in Pyjamas |
| Astralis | 16 | Dust II | 14 | Ninjas in Pyjamas |
| Astralis | – | Overpass | – | Ninjas in Pyjamas |

=== Semifinals ===
==== Natus Vincere vs. ENCE eSports ====
Casters: HenryG & Sadokist

Natus Vincere vs. ENCE eSports scores
| Team | Score | Map | Score | Team |
|---|---|---|---|---|
| Natus Vincere | 14 | Train | 16 | ENCE eSports |
| Natus Vincere | 16 | Dust II | 3 | ENCE eSports |
| Natus Vincere | 14 | Mirage | 16 | ENCE eSports |

==== MIBR vs. Astralis ====
Casters: Vince Hill & moses

MIBR vs. Astralis scores
| Team | Score | Map | Score | Team |
|---|---|---|---|---|
| MIBR | 14 | Overpass | 16 | Astralis |
| MIBR | 7 | Inferno | 16 | Astralis |
| MIBR | – | Train | – | Astralis |

=== Finals ===
Casters: HenryG & Sadokist

ENCE eSports vs. Astralis scores
| Team | Score | Map | Score | Team |
|---|---|---|---|---|
| ENCE eSports | 11 | Train | 16 | Astralis |
| ENCE eSports | 4 | Inferno | 16 | Astralis |
| ENCE eSports | – | Overpass | – | Astralis |

== Final standings ==
The final placings are shown below. In addition, the prize distribution, seed for the next major, roster, and coaches are shown. Each team's in-game leader is shown first.

| Place | Prize Money | Team | Seed | Roster | Coach |
|---|---|---|---|---|---|
| 1st | US$500,000 | Astralis | Berlin 2019 Legends | gla1ve, dev1ce, dupreeh, Magisk, Xyp9x | zonic |
| 2nd | US$150,000 | ENCE | Berlin 2019 Legends | Aleksib, Aerial, allu, sergej, xseven | Twista |
| 3rd – 4th | US$70,000 | MIBR | Berlin 2019 Legends | FalleN, coldzera, felps, fer, TACO | zews |
| 3rd – 4th | US$70,000 | Natus Vincere | Berlin 2019 Legends | Zeus, Edward, s1mple, electronic, flamie | kane |
| 5th – 8th | US$35,000 | FaZe Clan | Berlin 2019 Legends | NiKo, AdreN, GuardiaN, olofmeister, rain | YNk |
| 5th – 8th | US$35,000 | Ninjas in Pyjamas | Berlin 2019 Legends | Lekr0, dennis, f0rest, GeT RiGhT, REZ | pita |
| 5th – 8th | US$35,000 | Renegades | Berlin 2019 Legends | AZR, jks, Liazz, Gratisfaction, jkaem | kassad |
| 5th – 8th | US$35,000 | Team Liquid | Berlin 2019 Legends | nitr0, ELiGE, Stewie2K, NAF, Twistzz | adreN |
| 9th – 11th | US$8,750 | AVANGAR | Berlin 2019 Challengers | Jame, buster, fitch, KrizzeN, qikert | dastan |
| 9th – 11th | US$8,750 | Cloud9 | Berlin 2019 Challengers | Zellsis, (Note: Golden was unable to attend due to health issues, but due to Cloud9 having him listed on the roster after the rosters were locked, they were forced to list Zellsis as a coach so he could stand-in for Golden.) autimatic, RUSH, flusha, kioShiMa | – |
| 9th – 11th | US$8,750 | Team Vitality | Berlin 2019 Challengers | NBK-, apEX, Rpk, ZywOo, ALEX | XTQZZZ |
| 12th – 14th | US$8,750 | compLexity Gaming | Berlin 2019 Challengers | stanislaw, n0thing, ShahZaM, dephh, Rickeh | Warden |
| 12th – 14th | US$8,750 | G2 Esports | Berlin 2019 Challengers | shox, bodyy, JaCkz, kennyS, Lucky | maLeK |
| 12th – 14th | US$8,750 | HellRaisers | Berlin 2019 Challengers | ANGE1, DeadFox, HObbit, ISSAA, woxic | ami |
| 15th – 16th | US$8,750 | BIG | – | gob b, nex, tabseN, tiziaN, XANTARES | kakafu |
| 15th – 16th | US$8,750 | NRG Esports | – | daps, Brehze, Ethan, FugLy, CeRq | ImAPet |
| 17th – 19th | – | TyLoo | – | Attacker, somebody, Summer, xccurate, BnTeT | Johnta |
| 17th – 19th | – | ViCi Gaming | – | advent, aumaN, zhokiNg, Freeman, kaze | – |
| 17th – 19th | – | Winstrike Team | – | Boombl4, n0rb3r7, WorldEdit, Kvik, wayLander | iksou |
| 20th – 22nd | – | Fnatic | – | Xizt, Brollan, JW, KRiMZ, twist | Jumpy |
| 20th – 22nd | – | FURIA Esports | – | arT, ableJ, KSCERATO, VINI, yuurih | guerri |
| 20th – 22nd | – | Vega Squadron | – | chopper, hutji, tonyblack, crush, jR | Fierce |
| 23rd – 24th | – | Grayhound Gaming | – | dexter, DickStacy, malta, sterling, erkaSt | – |
| 23rd – 24th | – | Team Spirit | – | S0tF1k, DavCost, Dima, COLDYY1, somedieyoung | Certus |

=== Post-Major ranking ===
The rankings shown below reflect the March 4, 2019 rankings, the first ranking after the Major.

HLTV.org post-Major ranking

World ranking
| Place | Team | Points | Move^{1} |
|---|---|---|---|
| 1 | Astralis | 986 | Steady |
| 2 | Team Liquid | 534 | Steady |
| 3 | Natus Vincere | 464 | Steady |
| 4 | ENCE | 435 | ▲7 |
| 5 | MIBR | 352 | ▲4 |
| 6 | FaZe Clan | 310 | ▼2 |
| 7 | Renegades | 275 | ▲6 |
| 8 | Ninjas in Pyjamas | 252 | ▲6 |
| 9 | Cloud9 | 196 | ▼1 |
| 10 | Team Vitality | 184 | ▲5 |
| 11 | NRG Esports | 172 | ▼6 |
| 13 | AVANGAR | 149 | ▲5 |
| 14 | Fnatic | 147 | ▼8 |
| 16 | G2 Esports | 132 | ▲3 |
| 18 | BIG | 122 | ▼6 |
| 19 | HellRaisers | 88 | ▲2 |
| 21 | FURIA Esports | 83 | ▲2 |
| 22 | Winstrike Team | 83 | ▲6 |
| 23 | TyLoo | 71 | ▲44 |
| 25 | ViCi Gaming | 67 | ▲10 |
| 27 | compLexity Gaming | 63 | ▲12 |
| 28 | Grayhound Gaming | 53 | ▼6 |
| 31 | Team Spirit | – | ▼14 |
| 38 | Vega Squadron | – | ▲15 |

^{1}Change since February 11, 2019 ranking
