= Xyp9x =

Danish electronic sports player

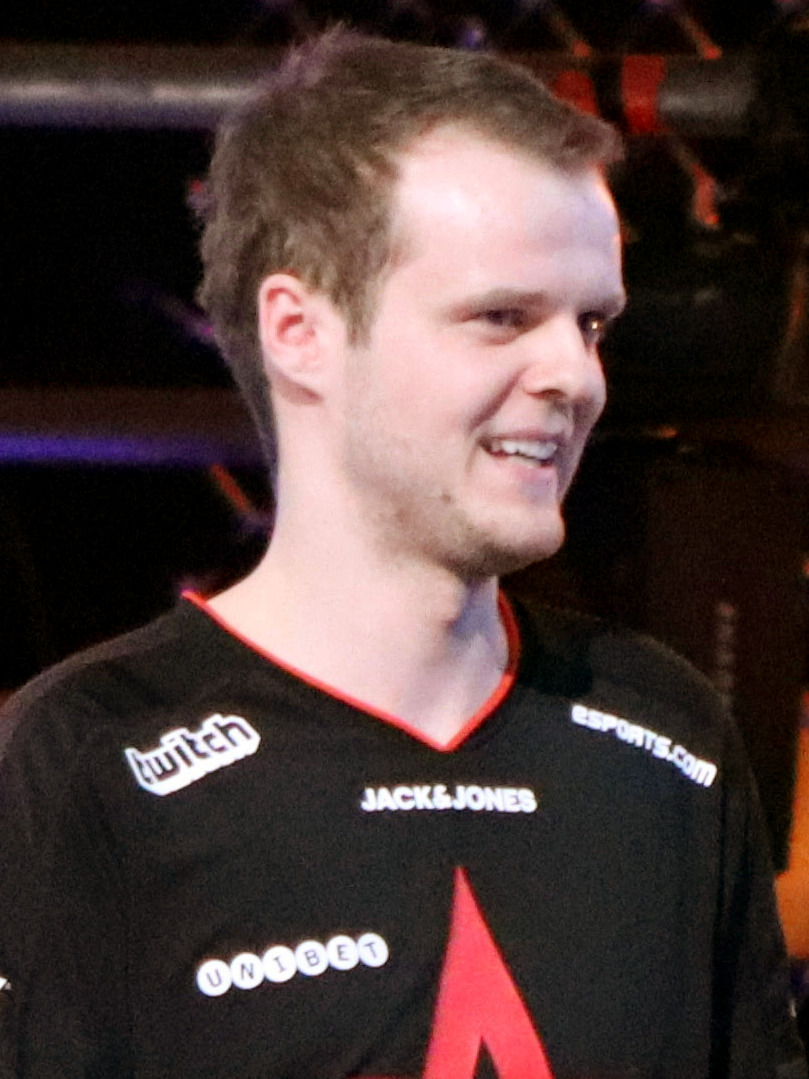
- Xyp9x during IEM Katowice 2019

Personal information
- Name: Andreas Højsleth
- Born: 11 September 1995 (age 31)
- Nationality: Danish

Current team
- Team: MOUZ
- Role: Assistant coach
- Game: Counter-Strike 2

Career information
- Games: Counter-Strike; CS:GO
- Playing career: 2011–2024

Team history
- 2013: Fnatic
- 2013: Copenhagen Wolves
- 2014–2015: Dignitas
- 2015: Team SoloMid
- 2016–2023: Astralis
- 2023–2024: Astralis Talent

As coach:
- 2024–present: MOUZ (assistant)

Career highlights and awards
- 4× CS:GO Major champion (Atlanta 2017, London 2018, Katowice 2019, Berlin 2019); IEM Grand Slam champion (Season 1); 4x HLTV Top 20 Player of the Year (2013, 2017–2019); HLTV MVP

Andreas Højsleth, better known as Xyp9x (zɪpɛks), is a Danish former professional Counter-Strike: Global Offensive player and current assistant coach for Counter-Strike 2 team MOUZ. He became the first (along with three of his teammates) to win four majors in CS:GO, and to win three majors consecutively during his stint with Astralis.

Højsleth was born and raised in Aars, North Denmark Region. He was most famously a member of the team Astralis. He is a former member of Team Solomid and Team Dignitas. The name Xyp9x was conceived by typing random keys on his keyboard. He was voted the 13th best CS:GO player of 2017 and 2018 by HLTV.org.

On April 19th 2023, Xyp9x was benched and transferred to the academy team of Astralis. It was also announced on the same day that he would be replaced by Alexander "Altekz" Givskov. On March 11th 2024, Xyp9x left the organisation after 8 years. Five days later, he joined Mouz as an assistant coach.
