= Astralis =

Danish esports team

- Short name: AST
- Games: Counter-Strike 2 (formerly Counter-Strike: Global Offensive); FIFA; Tom Clancy's Rainbow Six Siege; Fortnite: Battle Royale
- Founded: January 18, 2016; 10 years ago
- Location: Denmark
- Colors
- Owner: Astralis Group Management ApS
- President: Anders Hørsholt
- CEO: Nikolaj Nyholm; Anders Hørsholt
- Head coach: Filip "NEO" Kubski (CS2); Kevin "Easilyy" Skokowski (R6 Siege)
- Manager: Kasper Straube Hansen
- Website: www.astralis.gg

Astralis is a Danish esports organization. Best known for their Counter-Strike teams, the organization also competes in FIFA and previously competed in Rainbow Six Siege. The parent group of Astralis is the Astralis Group, who previously managed Origen and Future F.C. before the merger of all teams under the Astralis brand. Astralis Group became the first esports organization to conduct an initial public offering, and was formerly traded on the Copenhagen Stock Exchange. Astralis' Counter-Strike: Global Offensive team holds the record of the most Counter-Strike Major Championships won, with four.

== Counter-Strike: Global Offensive division ==
=== History ===
==== 2018 ====
On January 19, Astralis entered into the ELEAGUE Major in the United States with the group stages being played in Atlanta and the playoffs in Boston. Astralis, being the previous ELEAGUE major champions, were eager to claim the title and wanted to have a good start for 2018 after a good run at the previous year. However, things didn't go as expected as they started the tournament by losing to Mousesports. The Danes found themselves in a pretty tough situation, but they caught up by winning the second game against their old rivals North. On the third day of the tournament, they got upset by Fnatic as the Swedes left them with no more losses to conceive during the group stage in order to qualify. In the end, Astralis were eliminated after a loss against Cloud9, who later went on to win the major after winning a best-of-three grand final against the tournament favourites, FaZe Clan.

In February, Kjaerbye unexpectedly left Astralis to join North. Astralis were left scrambling for a fifth player but fortunately, they were able to sign Emil "Magisk" Reif a few days later. This would mark the beginning of an astronomical rise to the top and domination over the Counter-Strike scene. After a quarter-final finish at StarSeries S4 and a semi-final loss at IEM Katowice 2018, they reached the summit after a spectacular performance at DreamHack Marseille 2018, convincingly beating FaZe Clan, Fnatic, and Natus Vincere on their way to the title. Although they lost to FaZe Clan in the grand final after a narrow 3–0 best of five series at IEM Sydney 2018, they bounced back at ESL Pro League Season 7 Finals, swiftly defeating FaZe Clan and beating Team Liquid 3–1 to grab the trophy. They continued their dominance with trophies at ECS Season 5 Finals and ELEAGUE CS:GO Premier 2018, with a semi-final loss to Natus Vincere at ESL One: Cologne 2018 in between.

Astralis then crowned their era with their second Major title at FACEIT Major: London 2018, quickly beating FaZe Clan, Team Liquid, and Natus Vincere without dropping a single map in the playoffs. A mere 6 days later, they defeated MIBR 2–1 in the grand-final at BLAST Pro Series Istanbul 2018 – after having an undefeated 5–0 group stage – to continue their dominance over the scene. This dominance was brought on through meta-defining coordination and utility usage, significantly leading in average utility damage per round.

==== 2019 ====
At the IEM Katowice Major 2019, they picked up their third Major title, becoming the second team in CS:GO history (after Fnatic) to take home three Major titles, and the third to win two majors back-to-back. They made it into the New Champions stage after a convincing 3–0 score in the New Legends stage, beating Complexity Gaming, Cloud9 and Renegades. They then went through the New Champions stage without dropping a single map, beating Ninjas in Pyjamas, MIBR, and finally ENCE to secure the Major win.

Their dominance dropped off considerably after the IEM Katowice Major 2019, and had their spot taken by Team Liquid who had become the number one CS:GO team in the world.

Later on that August, Astralis attended the StarLadder Major: Berlin 2019. After winning their opening match against DreamEaters and G2 Esports, they lost their next match against NRG Esports, making history as they had the longest match in major history, 59 rounds in total. After losing to NRG, they defeated CR4ZY and proceeded to the playoffs. Astralis faced off Team Liquid in the Quarterfinals, and after a surprising map pick, they won the series convincingly. They once again faced off against NRG Esports in the semifinals and won the series. Finally, Astralis faced off against Avangar in the Grand Finals. Astralis won the series dominantly making them the first CS:GO team ever to win three consecutive majors, and the first team to achieve four major wins total, passing Fnatic's record of three.

In November 2019, following consistent success and multiple championships with the team, Astralis' coach zonic was honored with the "Coach of the Year Award" at the Esports Awards 2019.

==== 2020 ====
On March 22, 2020, Astralis announced the organisation was expanding the roster beyond the main five players, something unprecedented for CSGO teams at the time, signing Patrick "es3tag" Hansen from Heroic. es3tag would join Astralis following the end of his contract with Heroic on July 1. On May 11, Astralis signed a seventh player, Jakob "JUGi" Hansen, who had been benched on North until then. On May 19, gla1ve, announced he was taking a break from CSGO due to stress-like symptoms, with JUGi to make his debut for Astralis. Nine days later, Xyp9x announced via Twitter that he will also go on an indefinite break to focus on his mental health. Marko "Snappi" Pfeiffer would stand-in for Xyp9x until es3tag joins the team. In July 2020, Astralis replaced JUGi with Lucas "Bubzkji" Andersen, while gla1ve returned to the active roster 4 months later.

In September 2020, Astralis Group announced the merger of all teams under the Astralis brand.

In October 2020, Astralis would field Es3tag amongst Gla1ve, Dev1ce, Magisk and Dupreeh to claim 6 successive victories in a row during the group stages of ESL Pro League S12; a series streak only tarnished by one loss with Bubzkji in Es3tag's place. Later, at the group stages, Astralis would lose to Danish rivals Heroic only to complete a lower bracket run wherein they later claimed redemption against said rivals and went on to defeat Ukrainian rivals Natus Vincere in the grand finals.

==== 2021 ====
Following a change by Valve to major qualifiers to penalize 6-man rosters using mid-match substitutions, Astralis adjusted.

In April 2021, after more than five years with the team, Nicolai "dev1ce" Reedtz left the organization and was signed by Ninjas in Pyjamas. During his tenure with Astralis, dev1ce had set the record for most MVP medals in Counter-Strike history with 18.

In July 2021, gla1ve signed a new three-year contract through the summer of 2024 with Astralis. Later, Astralis completed the signing of Philip "Lucky" Ewald, an 18-year-old AWPer who had previously played for Tricked.

Astralis failed to reach the playoffs of the PGL Stockholm Major, leaving in the Legends group stage with one win and three losses.

On November 4, Astralis announced the addition of former Complexity duo Benjamin "blameF" Bremer and Kristian "k0nfig" Wienecke as well as Alexander "ave" Holdt as the new head coach. Magisk, Dupreeh, and zonic were inactive while waiting for their contracts to expire in January 2022.

==== 2022 ====
In January 2022, Magisk, dupreeh, and zonic left Astralis and were signed by Team Vitality.

On January 31, 2022, Bubzkji was released from his 18-month contract with Astralis. For most of his tenure in Astralis he was on the bench and played few maps, leading to pushback from the community. Bubzkji described the internal situation as being "stranded in a battle between the players and the organization. The organization maybe wanted me to play and saw me as the future, as I was the youngest, and the team wanted to give the old five a go as they have won so much — and I totally respected that. That meant that I got stuck as I didn't want to fight the organization and I didn't want to fight the team, either, and did what was asked of me from both sides." Bubzkji went on to work for Danish broadcaster TV2. He had received offers from various teams but chose not to compete. He did not rule out returning to competition indefinitely.

On February 22, Asger "Farlig" Jensen was signed as the new primary AWPer, Lucky was benched.

On May 4, Phillip "Lucky" Ewald announced that he will "search for new opportunities" as his contract with Astralis is set to expire in May.

On September 20, it was announced that Kristian "k0nfig" Wienecke would miss the European Regional Major Ranking due to an injury. It was later announced on October 10 that his contract with Astralis was to be terminated, likely due to the circumstances around the injury. The team fielded Mikkel "MistR" Thomsen from the Astralis Talent roster as a stand-in for the main roster.

On October 27, Nicolai "dev1ce" Reedtz returned to Astralis under a multi-year deal after his one and a half year tenure with Ninjas in Pyjamas.

==== 2023 ====
On January 5 Astralis formally appointed Nicolai "HUNDEN" Peterson as Head Analyst after being unbanned by ESIC. This led to a lot of controversy due to circumstances surrounding his ban and how he became unbanned.

He was banned for two years in August 2021 due to allegedly leaking "sensitive" documents to opponents, and was suddenly unbanned on December 2 following a meeting between the two parties. From HLTV: " So far, the only other thing that is now public knowledge is that ESIC deleted the original notice of sanction against HUNDEN on their website and the Dane made a point of thanking his legal team. "Matters have now been concluded on the basis of the agreed joint statement and further comments won’t be made," the 31-year-old tweeted. ESIC has also removed the original notice of charge announcement and other previous references to the case.

Astralis won CCT North Europe Series 3, an online tournament, after defeating Aurora Gaming in the grand final 2–1.

On April 18, 2023, Astralis announced the transfer of Xyp9x from the main roster to the academy roster, and was replaced by Alexander "Altekz" Givskov. Later that year, on June 22, Astralis benched gla1ve and replaced him with Victor "Staehr" Staehr, in addition to the transfer of Altekz back to the academy roster and signing of Johannes "b0RUP" Borup.

The new roster qualified for IEM Cologne 2023 following victories in the play-in over Team Liquid and Apeks. At the tournament, Astralis suffered an early defeat in the opening round to G2, before claiming victories against Ninjas in Pyjamas, MOUZ, and Natus Vincere to secure a playoffs spot in the quarter-finals. Astralis would beat Heroic to advance to the semi-finals, where they were eliminated from the tournament in a second loss to G2.

=== Championships ===
Bold denotes a CSGO Major

Tournament	Location	Placement	Prize	Roster
2016
ECS Season 2 Finals	Anaheim, California, USA	1st	$250,000	Dupreeh · dev1ce · Xyp9x · Kjaerbye · gla1ve · zonic (coach)
2017
**ELEAGUE Major: Atlanta 2017**	Atlanta, Georgia, USA	1st	$500,000	Dupreeh · dev1ce · Xyp9x · Kjaerbye · gla1ve · zonic (coach)
IEM Katowice 2017	Katowice, Poland	1st	$104,000	Dupreeh · dev1ce · Xyp9x · Kjaerbye · gla1ve · zonic (coach)
ELEAGUE Clash for Cash: The Rematch	Atlanta, Georgia, USA	1st	$250,000	Dupreeh · dev1ce · Xyp9x · Kjaerbye · gla1ve · zonic (coach)
2018
DreamHack Masters Marseille 2018	Marseille, France	1st	$100,000	Dupreeh · dev1ce · Xyp9x · gla1ve · Magisk · zonic (coach)
ESL Pro League Season 7 Finals	Dallas, Texas, USA	1st	$250,000	Dupreeh · dev1ce · Xyp9x · gla1ve · Magisk · zonic (coach)
ECS Season 5 Finals	London, United Kingdom	1st	$250,000	Dupreeh · dev1ce · Xyp9x · gla1ve · Magisk · zonic (coach)
ELEAGUE CS:GO Premier 2018	Atlanta, Georgia, USA	1st	$500,000	Dupreeh · dev1ce · Xyp9x · gla1ve · Magisk · zonic (coach)
**FACEIT Major: London 2018**	London, United Kingdom	1st	$500,000	Dupreeh · dev1ce · Xyp9x · gla1ve · Magisk · zonic (coach)
BLAST Pro Series: Istanbul 2018	Istanbul, Turkey	1st	$125,000	Dupreeh · dev1ce · Xyp9x · gla1ve · Magisk · zonic (coach)
IEM Chicago 2018	Chicago, Illinois, United States	1st	$100,000	Dupreeh · dev1ce · Xyp9x · gla1ve · Magisk · zonic (coach)
ECS Season 6 Finals	Arlington, Texas, United States	1st	$250,000	Dupreeh · dev1ce · Xyp9x · gla1ve · Magisk · zonic (coach)
ESL Pro League Season 8 Finals	Odense, Denmark	1st	$250,000	Dupreeh · dev1ce · Xyp9x · gla1ve · Magisk · zonic (coach)
BLAST Pro Series: Lisbon 2018	Lisbon, Portugal	1st	$125,000	Dupreeh · dev1ce · Xyp9x · gla1ve · Magisk · zonic (coach)
2019
**IEM Katowice Major 2019**	Katowice, Poland	1st	$500,000	Dupreeh · dev1ce · Xyp9x · gla1ve · Magisk · zonic (coach)
BLAST Pro Series: São Paulo 2019	São Paulo, Brazil	1st	$125,000	Dupreeh · dev1ce · Xyp9x · gla1ve · Magisk · zonic (coach)
**StarLadder Major: Berlin 2019**	Berlin, Germany	1st	$500,000	Dupreeh · dev1ce · Xyp9x · gla1ve · Magisk · zonic (coach)
IEM Beijing 2019	Beijing, China	1st	$125,000	Dupreeh · dev1ce · Xyp9x · gla1ve · Magisk · zonic (coach)
ECS Season 8 Finals	Arlington, Texas, United States	1st	$225,000	Dupreeh · dev1ce · Xyp9x · gla1ve · Magisk · zonic (coach)
BLAST Pro Series: Global Final 2019	Riffa, Bahrain	1st	$350,000	Dupreeh · dev1ce · Xyp9x · gla1ve · Magisk · zonic (coach)
2020
ESL One: Road to Rio Europe	Europe	1st	$33,000	Dupreeh · dev1ce · Xyp9x · gla1ve · Magisk · zonic (coach)
ESL Pro League Season 12 Europe	Europe	1st	$99,000	Dupreeh · dev1ce · Magisk · gla1ve · es3tag · Bubzkji · zonic (coach)
DreamHack Masters Winter 2020 Europe	Europe	1st	$60,000	Dupreeh · dev1ce · Magisk · gla1ve · Xyp9x · Bubzkji · zonic (coach)
IEM Global Challenge 2020	Europe	1st	$200,000	Dupreeh · dev1ce · Magisk · gla1ve · Xyp9x · Bubzkji · zonic (coach)

== Counter-Strike 2 division ==
=== History ===
==== 2023 ====
Astralis' first tournament following the release of Counter-Strike 2 was Roobet Cup 2023 in October, where they finished 13–16th after losses to 9INE and Apeks. The team was invited to the CS Asia Championships 2023 the following month, qualifying to the semi-finals following victories over Chinese roster Lynn Vision and ENCE. Astralis were eliminated from the tournament after a 2–1 loss to MOUZ.

On November 22, 2023, Astralis announced the release of gla1ve. Two days later, jabbi and stavn transferred from Heroic, resulting in the benchings of Buzz and b0RUP. On January 1, 2024, b0RUP departed from Astralis following his transfer to Sashi.

==== 2024 ====
Astralis attended BLAST Premier Spring Groups 2024, where they reached the finals of their group against Team Vitality, following a win over debutants Team Falcons, and a previous victory over Vitality. The team fell to the play-in stage after a loss against Vitality in the group final, before defeating BIG Clan to qualify for BLAST Premier Spring Finals 2024.

Astralis failed to qualify for IEM Katowice 2024 after losses to Heroic and ENCE.

Astralis failed to qualify for the PGL Copenhagen Major 2024, the first Valve-sponsored major in their home country of Denmark, after losing in the last chance qualifier to 9 Pandas. Many analysts criticized Astralis for their poor performance and a lack of leadership for having Staehr, their youngest and best performing player of the RMR, do the exit interview which is typically done by senior members of the team. As a result of their dismal RMR results, Astralis announced on February 28 that they will be benching blameF, whose contract with Astralis expires at the end of 2025. The RMR will also mark the end of R0nic's tenure as coach as former OG coach Casper "ruggah" Due will be making his coaching debut for Astralis in IEM Chengdu 2024.

On February 29, Astralis announced the signing of Alexander "br0" Bro, who had previously played for Astralis' academy roster, from Ukrainian organization Monte. Astralis also announced that dev1ce would take over as the team's in-game leader, following the departure of previous leader blameF.

== Rosters ==
Astralis rosters

Counter-Strike 2
Handle	Name	Nationality
Staehr	Staehr, Victor	Denmark
phzy	Smidebrant, Love	Sweden
ryu	Glušauskas, Gytis	Lithuania
cmtry	Samolotov, Nikita	Ukraine
siuhy	Szkaradek, Kamil	Poland
HooXi (I)	Nielsen, Rasmus	Denmark
jabbi (I)	Nygaard, Jakob	Denmark

FIFA
Handle	Name	Nationality
Teca	Luana da Silva Santo, Stephanie	Brazil

Fortnite
Handle	Name	Nationality
Th0masHD	Høxbro Davidsen, Thomas	Denmark

Rainbow Six Siege
Handle	Name	Nationality
Dpfire	Macway, Matthew	United States
iconic	Ifidon, David	United States
J90	Burkard, Jack	United States
Shuttle	Dugger, Aaron	United States
Forrest	Breaux, Roman	United States

Legend:
- (I) Inactive
- (S) Suspended
- (L) On loan
- (2W) Two-way player
- Substitute
- (injured) Injury / Illness

== Company ==
Astralis Group A/S
- Type: Public
- Traded as: Nasdaq Copenhagen: ASTRLS.CO
- Founded: July 31, 2019; 7 years ago
- Headquarters: Copenhagen, Denmark
- Number of employees: 32 (2019)
- Subsidiaries: Astralis Group Management ApS (100%)

Astralis was originally founded by Danish startup RFRSH Entertainment ApS. It was split off into a wholly owned subsidiary called RFRESH Teams ApS in November 2018. Due to concerns about conflict of interest with RFRSH-owned tournament series BLAST Pro Series, RFRSH demerged Astralis In November 2019. While RFRESH was renamed into Blast ApS in July 2019, RFRESH Teams ApS renamed into Astralis Group Management ApS, which became a wholly owned subsidiary of newly established Astralis Group Holding ApS. In November 2019, Astralis Group became the first esports organization to conduct an initial public offering, with Astralis Group Holding ApS reforming as Astralis Group A/S.

== Controversy ==
=== RFRSH Entertainment ===
In 2019, RFRSH Entertainment experienced criticism from the Counter-Strike community over the potential conflict of interest between Astralis and BLAST Pro Series, a tournament organized by RFRSH. RFRSH formerly represented and operated Astralis's strategic and commercial operations until Summer of that year. Astralis skipped several tournaments to attend BLAST Pro Series events. This, paired with the fact that certain teams had to attend a number of BLAST events every year, caused controversy in the community. In July, RFRSH announced to split from Astralis, though some in the community still criticized RFRSH and BLAST.

=== FunPlus Phoenix and the signing of es3tag ===
In March 2020, the Chinese organization of FunPlus Phoenix (FPX), was in the process of signing the roster of Heroic, which included es3tag, shortly before the beginning of Flashpoint 1. Astralis signed es3tag which deterred FPX from signing the rest of the Heroic roster. FPX was a founding member of Flashpoint, so the Heroic roster could not continue playing in Flashpoint and had to be replaced by a team of FPX's choosing. FPX originally intended to field the American team of Swole Patrol, but disputes over naming rights led to FPX fielding Bad News Bears instead. Astralis was criticized for knowingly signing es3tag while he was in the process of being signed by another organization and also for preventing the rest of the Heroic players from playing in Flashpoint and signing with FPX.

Awards and achievements
Preceded by ESL One Cologne 2016; SK Gaming	ELEAGUE Major 2017 winner 2017	Succeeded by PGL Major Kraków 2017; Gambit Esports
Preceded by ELEAGUE Major: Boston 2018; Cloud9	FACEIT London Major 2018 winner 2018	Succeeded by Intel Extreme Masters Season XIII – World Championship Major; Astralis
Preceded by FACEIT London Major 2018; Astralis	Intel Extreme Masters Season XIII – World Championship Major winner 2019	Succeeded by StarLadder Major: Berlin 2019; Astralis
Preceded by Intel Extreme Masters Season XIII – World Championship Major; Astralis	StarLadder Major: Berlin 2019 winner 2019	Succeeded by PGL Major Stockholm 2021; Natus Vincere
