= FACEIT Major: London 2018 =

2018 CS:GO championship

FACEIT Major 2018
- 2018
- The FACEIT Major 2018 logo

Tournament information
- Sport: Counter-Strike: Global Offensive
- Location: London, United Kingdom
- Dates: 5–23 September
- Administrator: Valve; FACEIT
- Tournament format(s): Two 16-team Buchholz group stages 8-team single-elimination playoff
- Venue: Twickenham Stadium; The SSE Arena, Wembley
- Teams: 24 teams
- Purse: $1,000,000 USD

Final positions
- Champions: Astralis (2nd title)
- 1st runners-up: Natus Vincere
- 2nd runners-up: MIBR; Team Liquid
- MVP: Nicolai "dev1ce" Reedtz

The FACEIT Major: London 2018, also known as FACEIT Major 2018, or London 2018, was the thirteenth Counter-Strike: Global Offensive Major Championship, the second Major of 2018, and first organized by FACEIT. It featured twenty-four professional teams from around the world and took place in London, United Kingdom. The group stages were held in Twickenham Stadium, and the playoffs were played in front of a live crowd in the SSE Arena, Wembley. The London Major was the sixth consecutive major with a prize pool of $1,000,000. The top sixteen teams from the previous Major, Boston 2018, automatically qualified for the FACEIT Major while another eight teams qualified from their respective regional qualifiers. The eight from regional qualifiers and the bottom eight teams from Boston 2018 (together called the "Challengers") competed in the New Challengers group stage, a Swiss-system tournament. The top eight from this stage then advanced to face the top eight teams from Boston ("Legends") in a second Swiss-system group stage, the New Legends stage. The top eight from this stage advanced to the playoffs.

FaZe Clan, MIBR, and Natus Vincere were the only incoming Legends to retain their Legend status at this Major by advancing to the playoff stage. Team Liquid, compLexity Gaming, BIG, HellRaisers, and Astralis were new Legends. Defending champions Cloud9, along with mousesports, Fnatic, G2 Esports, and Winstrike Team, were knocked out in the New Legends stage, thus losing their Legends status. Fnatic failed to advance to the playoffs for the first time in the team's history; the organization had been a Legend at every Major until London. This also ended Freddy "KRiMZ" Johansson's run as one of the only players to attend every Major and become Legends. This left Olof "olofmeister" Kajbjer as the only player to become a Legend at every Major in CS:GO history, and MIBR as the only team to be Legends at every Major it had attended. This Major was also significant in that no majority-Swedish team became Legends after Ninjas in Pyjamas fell to MIBR in the New Legends stage. Cloud9 also became the second team in CS:GO history to lose its Legends status after winning the previous Major, along with Team EnVyUs.

The grand finals pitted Natus Vincere and Astralis against each other. Natus Vincere defeated BIG in the quarterfinals and MIBR in the semifinals while Astralis defeated FaZe Clan and Team Liquid respectively. In a fairly convincing two map sweep, Astralis took down Natus Vincere for its second Major championship to draw level with MIBR and the former Team EnVyUs French core for the second most Major titles.

== Background ==
Counter-Strike: Global Offensive (CS:GO) is a multiplayer first-person shooter video game developed by Hidden Path Entertainment and Valve. It is the fourth game in the Counter-Strike series. In professional CS:GO, the Valve-sponsored Majors are the most prestigious tournaments.

The defending champion was Cloud9, which became the first North American team to win a Major and just the third non-European team to win a Major. The Swedish team Fnatic attended as the most decorated CS:GO team in Major history, with three wins.

== Format ==
FACEIT largely retained the Major format from Boston 2018 that had been announced by Valve and ELEAGUE, where the offline qualifier that had taken place before early Majors was rebranded as the "New Challengers stage" and became an official part of the full Major. Apart from this, the competitive format had remained nearly constant since implementing the 16-team Swiss system over the GSL format at ELEAGUE Major 2017.

The Major cycle began with four Minors, or regional qualifiers: Americas, Asia, CIS, and Europe. Two teams from each qualifier moved on to the New Challengers stage. The New Challengers stage featured sixteen teams: the bottom eight teams from the previous Major's New Legends stage and the eight teams from the Minors. These teams played in a sixteen team, Swiss-system format. The top eight teams from this stage moved on to the next stage of the Major, the "New Legends stage".

The 16-team New Legends stage, which replaced the old group stage, featured the eight teams advancing from the New Challengers stage and the eight Legends from the Boston Major. Like the New Challengers stage, the New Legends stage used a 16-team, Swiss-system format. The top eight teams from this stage moved on to the playoff bracket and gained Legend status for the following Major.

FACEIT's format for the New Challengers and the New Legends stages made few adjustments to the Boston format. In round five of each Swiss group stage, the remaining six teams played a best-of-three instead of the previous best-of-one. In addition, the group stage used the Buchholz system for seeding the Swiss-system, rather than random draw. In FACEIT's Buchholz system, the teams with the hardest strength of schedule earned the higher seeds after the first round; strength of schedule is determined by how many wins the team's opponent has had.

In the playoffs, now known as the "New Champions stage," eight teams played in a single elimination, best-of-three bracket. FACEIT also made slight changes to the New Champions stage. Rather than randomizing the teams with the same records, these playoffs seeded teams based on how difficult their opponents in the group stage had been. This was determined by adding up opponent wins from the New Legends stage.

=== Map pool ===
On April 20, 2018, Valve announced that the revamped Dust II would be replacing Cobblestone in the Active Duty map pool, changing the map pool from Boston 2018.

Maps

- Cache
- Dust II
- Inferno
- Mirage
- Nuke
- Overpass
- Train

== Regional qualifiers ==
Each regional qualifier, called "Minors", featured eight teams, whether through direct invitation or through qualifiers. Each minor featured two groups of four teams; these groups were in GSL double elimination formats, which was the format used at every major until the ELEAGUE Major, with the initial matches and winners match being best of ones and the losers and decider series being best of three. Two teams of each group qualify for the bracket phase, which is a four team, double elimination, best of three bracket. Two teams qualify for the major qualifier from each minor.

Each minor also had a US$50,000 prize pool with first place receiving US$30,000, second place taking in US$15,000, and third place raking in the last US$5,000. In addition, all four minors will be held in London at the Twickenham Stadium to combat any last minute visa issues before the actual Major starts.

=== Asia Minor ===
The Asia Minor ran from July 16 to July 20. Two teams were invited to the Asia Minor, unlike the last Asia Minor, in which all eight teams were invited. Two teams qualified from the Southeast Asia qualifier (which includes India), one team from the East Asia qualifier, one team from the Middle East qualifier, one team from the Oceania qualifier, and one team from the China qualifier. Each open Asian regional qualifier was a single elimination bracket.

Controversy ensued in the China qualifier. Fierce Tiger had won the China qualifier via forfeit from VG.FlashGaming due to the latter's internet issues. VG.Flash suspected that its internet had been "sabotaged" before the match was about to start. FACEIT decided that the match would be replayed. Fierce Tiger was unhappy with the decision, saying that VG.Flash should be held accountable for its own issues and that its players were already on vacation. Fierce Tiger later said that it would not surrender its China qualifier win and hoped that FACEIT would could reach a "verdict with fair play in mind." FACEIT administrators also realized that three of Fierce Tiger's four matches resulted in forfeits, with the other match being a 16–0 against Team MAX, making a possibility of a denial-of-service attack or match fixing likely. After speculations arose about the mysterious new fifth player Fierce Tiger brought on to the team who went by the alias "tbgirl", FACEIT learned and eventually confirmed with Valve that "tbgirl" was actually a player named Kun "LEo" Hou. LEo had recently been banned by Valve with a VAC ban. A VAC ban is an official ban by Valve if a player is caught cheating with Valve's anti-cheat system and any player with a VAC ban would be ineligible to play at a Valve-sponsored tournament and would last a lifetime. Fierce Tiger tried to hide "LEo"'s new identity and knowingly let the banned player play. In the end, FACEIT disqualified Fierce Tiger and Roar eSports would face off against VG.Flash in the final.

Teams

- Renegades (Invited)
- TyLoo (Invited)
- 5Power Club (Note: 5Power Club had three players with visa issues, so the team was forced to gather three players with visas to the United Kingdom quickly before the event started.) (Southeast Asia)
- B.O.O.T-dream[S]cape (Note: Signature Gaming's visa applications were denied by the British embassy. FACEIT decided to find a replacement instead of running the event with seven teams like the CIS Minor. The semifinalists runner-ups at the Southeast Asia qualifier, B.O.O.T-dream[S]cape and Devious, played to replace Signature. B.O.O.T-dream[S]cape would stroll its way into the Asia Minor.) (Southeast Asia)
- SCARZ Absolute (East Asia)
- Uniquestars (Middle East)
- Tainted Minds (Oceania)
- ViCi.Flash Gaming (China)

Bracket

Upper round 1
A1	SCARZ Absolute	0
B2	Tainted Minds	2
B1	TyLoo	2
A2	Renegades	1
Lower round 1
A1	SCARZ Absolute	1
A2	Renegades	2

Upper final
B2	Tainted Minds	0
B1	TyLoo	2
Lower final
B2	Tainted Minds	0
A2	Renegades	2

Final
B1	TyLoo	0
A2	Renegades	2

=== CIS Minor ===
The CIS Minor ran from July 10 to July 13. All eight teams in the CIS Minor came from the closed qualifier. In the closed qualifier, eight teams were invited and another eight teams qualified from four separate open qualifiers. The closed qualifier was a sixteen team, best of three, Swiss system format and the top eight teams moved on to the CIS Minor.

Before the Minor even started, Nemiga Gaming was denied visas to the United Kingdom, so the team was unable to attend the Minor. Instead of finding a replacement, FACEIT decided to run the event with seven teams. Visa denial issues also forced two additional teams (PLINK-TECH and Monolith Gaming) to play with stand-ins. This Minor was notable in that it would be the first Major in which Yegor "markeloff" Markelov would not participate in after his FlipSid3 Tactics team lost to three unknown teams in the CIS closed qualifier.

Teams

- HellRaisers (Closed #1–2)
- Team Spirit (Closed #1–2)
- AVANGAR (Closed #3–5)
- ~~Nemiga Gaming (Closed #3–5)~~
- pro100 (Closed #3–5)
- forZe (Closed #6–8)
- PLINK-TECH (Closed #6–8)
- Monolith Gaming (Closed #6–8)

Bracket

Upper round 1
A1	HellRaisers	2
B2	AVANGAR	0
B1	Team Spirit	0
A2	pro100	2
Lower round 1
B2	AVANGAR	1
B1	Team Spirit	2

Upper final
A1	HellRaisers	2
A2	pro100	0
Lower final
A2	pro100	0
B1	Team Spirit	2

Final
A1	HellRaisers	2
B1	Team Spirit	1

=== Europe Minor ===
The Europe Minor ran from July 19 to July 22. The Europe Minor will be exactly like the CIS Minor. All eight teams in the Europe Minor will come from the closed qualifier. In the closed qualifier, eight teams will be invited and another eight teams will qualify from four separate open qualifiers. The closed qualifier will be a sixteen team, best of three, Swiss system format and the top eight teams move on to the Europe Minor. Notably, Ninjas in Pyjamas were able to qualify for a Major for the first time in over two years.

Teams

- OpTic Gaming (Closed #1–2)
- Team Kinguin (Closed #1–2)
- ENCE eSports (Closed #3–5)
- Ninjas in Pyjamas (Closed #3–5)
- Red Reserve (Closed #3–5)
- 3DMAX (Closed #6–8)
- LeftOut (Closed #6–8)
- Sprout Esports (Closed #6–8)

Bracket

Upper round 1
A1	OpTic Gaming	2
B2	Ninjas in Pyjamas	1
B1	Sprout Esports	0
A2	ENCE eSports	2
Lower round 1
B2	Ninjas in Pyjamas	2
B1	Sprout Esports	1

Upper final
A1	OpTic Gaming	2
A2	ENCE eSports	1
Lower final
A2	ENCE eSports	0
B2	Ninjas in Pyjamas	2

Final
A1	OpTic Gaming	0
B2	Ninjas in Pyjamas	2

=== Americas Minor ===
The Americas Minor ran from July 7 to July 11. Unlike the previous America Minors, no team was directly invited to the Americas Minor. This time, six teams will come from the North American closed qualifier and two teams will come from the South American open qualifier. In the North American closed qualifier, eight teams will be invited and another eight teams will come from four separate open qualifiers. These teams will play in a sixteen teams, best of three Swiss system format and the top six teams will move on to the Americas Minor. The South American open will have two open qualifiers and each will be a single elimination, 1024 team bracket.

Teams

- compLexity Gaming (North America #1–2)
- NRG Esports (North America #1–2)
- eUnited (North America #3–5)
- Rogue (North America #3–5)
- Team Dignitas (North America #3–5)
- Swole Patrol (Note: Three teams were tied for sixth place at the North American closed qualifier. The tiebreaker was determined by whichever team had the best map win to loss difference. Swole Patrol (8–5) was able to beat out Luminosity Gaming (6–5) and Team One (6–6) to take the last spot in the Americas Minor.) (North America #6)
- Não Tem Como (South America 1)
- Furia eSports (South America 2)

Bracket

Upper round 1
A1	NRG Esports	1
B2	compLexity	2
B1	Rogue	2
A2	eUnited	1
Lower round 1
A1	NRG Esports	1
A2	eUnited	2

Upper final
B2	compLexity	0
B1	Rogue	2
Lower final
B2	compLexity	2
A2	eUnited	0

Final
B1	Rogue	0
B2	compLexity	2

== Broadcast talent ==
Desk host

- Alex "Machine" Richardson

Stage host

- Freya Spiers

Interviewer

- Pala Gilroy Sen

Commentators

- James Bardolph
- Anders Blume
- Henry "HenryG" Greer
- Vince Hill
- Daniel "ddk" Kapadia
- Jason "moses" O'Toole
- Matthew "Sadokist" Trivett

Analysts

- Chad "SPUNJ" Burchill
- Sean "seang@res" Gares
- Björn "THREAT" Pers
- Damian "daps" Steele
- Jacob "Pimp" Winneche

Observers

- Connor "Sliggy" Blomfield

=== Broadcasts ===
The major was streamed in various languages across Twitch. China streamed its broadcast on Douyu. Streams were also shown on FACEIT's YouTube's channel and on Steam.tv.

- FACEIT TV
- 1PV
- 500bros
- 99Damage
- Douyu
- GamerTV
- GamerTV
- Hitpoint
- IZAKOO
- RTP Arena
- StarLadder

== Teams competing ==
Legends

- Cloud9
- FaZe Clan
- Natus Vincere
- MIBR (Note: Immortals acquire the MIBR (Made in Brazil) brand. The SK Gaming players' contracts expired and Immortals picked up the roster. Immortals announced that they would be playing under the MIBR tag.)
- Fnatic
- G2 Esports
- mousesports
- Winstrike Team (Note: Quantum Bellator Fire sold its team to a newly formed organization called Winstrike Team.)

Boston 2018 9th–16th

- Gambit Esports
- Space Soldiers
- Vega Squadron
- Astralis
- BIG
- Team Liquid
- North
- Virtus.pro

Regional Qualifiers

- Renegades (Asia Minor #1)
- TyLoo (Asia Minor #2)
- HellRaisers (CIS Minor #1)
- Team Spirit (CIS Minor #2)
- Ninjas in Pyjamas (Europe Minor #1)
- OpTic Gaming (Europe Minor #2)
- compLexity Gaming (Americas Minor #1)
- Rogue (Americas Minor #2)

=== Pre-major ranking ===
HLTV.org rank teams based on results of teams' performances. The rankings shown below reflect the September 3, 2018 rankings.

Teams that were in the top 30 but failed to qualify for the major include NRG eSports (#9, United States), Heroic (#13, Denmark), ENCE eSports (#18, Finland), Ghost Gaming (#22, Canada), Luminosity Gaming (#23, Brazil), Imperial Esports (#24, Lithuania), AGO Esports (#25, Poland), Fragsters (#26, Denmark), AVANGAR (#27, Kazakhstan), and Team Kinguin (#28, Poland).

HLTV.org pre-major ranking

World ranking
Place	Team	Points	Move^{1}	Peak^{2}	Low^{2}	Best Major placing^{3}	Best achievements^{2}
1	Astralis	982	Steady	1	8	1st at Atlanta 2017	ECS Season 5 winner ELEAGUE Premier 2018 winner ESL Pro League Season 7 winner
2	Natus Vincere	709	Steady	2	10	2nd at Cluj-Napoca 2015; 2nd at Columbus 2016	SL i-League Season 5 winner ESL One Cologne 2018 winner
3	Team Liquid	482	Steady	3	14	2nd at Cologne 2016	cs_summit 2 winner ECS Season 5 runner-up ELEAGUE Premier 2018 runner-up
4	North	477	▲6	4	17	5th at Atlanta 2017; 5th at Kraków 2017	DreamHack Masters Stockholm 2018 winner DreamHack Open Valencia 2018 winner
5	mousesports	472	Steady	2	8	5th at Boston 2018	SL i-League Season 4 winner V4 Future Sports Festival winner
6	FaZe Clan	457	▼2	1	6	2nd at Boston 2018	ELEAGUE Premier 2018 winner IEM Sydney 2018 winner ESL Belo Horizonte 2018 winner
7	MIBR	358	Steady	1	8	1st at Columbus 2016; 1st at Cologne 2016	Adrenaline Cyber League 2018 winner Moche XL Esports winner ZOTAC Cup Masters 2018 winner
8	Ninjas in Pyjamas	271	▲6	6	14	1st at Cologne 2014	5th at SL i-League S5; 3rd at DreamHack Masters Stockholm 2018
10	Fnatic	220	▼2	2	10	1st at Winter 2013; 1st at Katowice 2015; 1st Cologne 2015	Intel Extreme Masters XII – World Championship winner World Electronic Sports Games 2017 winner
11	BIG	277	▼5	6	31	5th at Kraków 2017	ESEA Season 27 winner ESL One Cologne 2018 runner-up
12	TyLoo	178	Steady	10	30	2nd at Boston 2018 Asia Minor	SL & ImbaTV Chongqing winner Qi Invitational runner-up
14	G2 Esports	136	▼3	4	25	5th at Boston 2018	5th at SL i-League Season 4; 5th at ECS Season 5; 5th at ESL One Cologne 2018
15	HellRaisers	128	▲1	13	21	5th at Katowice 2014; 5th at Winter 2014	DreamHack Open Tours 2018 runner-up Moche XL Esports runner-up
16	Renegades	128	▼1	10	19	9th at Cologne 2015	5th at SL i-League S4; 5th at IEM Sydney 2018
17	OpTic Gaming	115	▲3	15	48	2nd at London 2018 Europe Minor	DreamHack Summer 2018 runner-up 5th at ZOTAC Cup Masters 2018
19	Gambit Esports	108	▼1	10	21	1st at Kraków 2017	3rd at DreamHack Masters Marseille 2018; 3rd at DreamHack Open Tours 2018
20	Virtus.pro	102	▼1	10	22	1st at Katowice 2014	V4 Future Sports Festival runner-up CS:GO Asia Championships 2018 runner-up
21	Cloud9	99	▼4	2	21	1st at Boston 2018	5th at World Electronic Sports Games 2017 cs_summit 2 runner-up
29	compLexity Gaming	70	▼3	21	55	3rd at Winter 2013	5th at DreamHack Open Summer 2018
30	Rogue	70	▼8	22	63	2nd at London 2018 Americas Minor	DreamHack Open Austin 2018 runner-up
31	Space Soldiers	–	▼3	12	31	9th at Boston 2018	World Electronic Sports Games 2017 runner-up DreamHack Open Austin 2018 winner
36	Team Spirit	–	▲1	23	37	2nd at London 2018 CIS Minor	SL & ImbaTV Chongqing 2018 runner-up ESEA Season 27 runner-up
47	Winstrike Team	–	▲1	12	51	5th at Boston 2018	M.Game League #2 winner 3rd at World Cyber Arena 2017
211	Vega Squadron	–	▼133	14	211	9th at Boston 2018	5th at SL & ImbaTV Chongqing 2018

^{1}Change since August 27, 2018 ranking

^{2}Since end of ELEAGUE Boston Major

^{3}Best major placements may not necessarily reflect teams' current rosters

== New Challengers stage ==
The New Challengers stage took place from September 5 to September 9, 2018. The Challengers stage, also known as the Preliminary stage and formerly known as the offline qualifier, will be a sixteen team swiss tournament: after the randomly-drawn Day 1 games, teams will play other teams with the same win–loss record. Every round will consist of one game. In addition, teams will not play the same team twice unless necessary and teams will be randomly chosen for the first two rounds; afterwards, rounds three through five will use the Buchholz system, meaning that seeding will take place for next matchups. In addition, round five matchups will be a best of three rather than a best of one. Any team with three wins would qualify for the New Legends stage, and any team with three losses would be eliminated.

In the first round, teams from pool one will be matched up against teams in pool four. Teams in pool two will play teams in pool three. One team from a pool is randomly decided to face off against a randomly decided team in another pool. Teams in pool one are Gambit Esports, Space Soldiers, Vega Squadron, and a randomly decided team among Astralis, BIG, and Team Liquid. Teams in pool two are the two other teams from Astralis, BIG, and Team Liquid; North; and Virtus.pro. Teams in pool three are the Minor winners: Renegades, HellRaisers, Ninjas in Pyjamas, and compLexity Gaming. Teams in pool four are the Minor runner-ups: TyLoo, Team Spirit, OpTic Gaming, and Rogue.

In the second round, the winners in the first round will face each other in the "high" matches, in which teams with a 1–0 record will play against each other; the losers will face each other in the "low" matches, in which teams with a 0–1 record will play each other.

In the third round, the winners of the high matches (teams with 2–0 records) from round two will face each other. The winners of these two matches will qualify for the major. The losers of the high round and the winners of the low round (teams with 1–1 records) will face each other in the "mid" matches. The losers from the previous low matches (teams with 0–2 records) will face each other in round three's low matches. The losers of these low matches are eliminated. Twelve teams remain in the Challengers stage.

In the fourth round, the losers of the high matches and the winners of the mid matches (teams with 2–1 records) will face each other in round four's high matches. The winners of those high matches qualify for the next phase of the Major. The losers of the mid matches and the winners of the low matches (teams with 1–2 records) will face each other in the low matches of round four. The losers of these matches are eliminated from the Major. Six teams remain.

In the last round, the remaining teams will face off (teams with 2–2 records). The winners of these matches will qualify for the New Legends stage and the losing teams will be eliminated from the Major. Instead of a best of one, these games will be a best of three. In the most ideal of situations, the Swiss format should allow teams to have a harder time each time they win and have an easier time each time they lose.

Place	Team	Record	RD	Round 1	Round 2	Round 3	Round 4	Round 5
1–2	Team Liquid	3–0	+20	OpTic Gaming; 16–4; Mirage	High match HellRaisers; 16–9; Inferno	High match Vega Squadron; 19–17; Cache	New Legends stage	New Legends stage
1–2	Ninjas in Pyjamas	3–0	+17	Virtus.pro; 16–5; Mirage	High match TyLoo; 16–12; Train	High match Astralis; 28–26; Mirage	New Legends stage	New Legends stage
3–5	Astralis	3–1	+26	compLexity Gaming; 16–4; Inferno	High match Rogue; 16–13; Inferno	High match Ninjas in Pyjamas; 26–28; Mirage	High match Team Spirit; 16–3; Dust II	New Legends stage
3–5	compLexity Gaming	3–1	+1	Astralis; 4–16; Inferno	Low match Space Soldiers; 16–11; Inferno	Mid match BIG; 16–12; Inferno	High match Vega Squadron; 19–15; Inferno	New Legends stage
3–5	HellRaisers	3–1	−1	North; 19–17; Overpass	High match Team Liquid; 9–16; Inferno	Mid match Gambit Esports; 16–14; Overpass	High match OpTic Gaming; 25–23; Train	New Legends stage
6–8	BIG	3–2	+23	Renegades; 16–6; Overpass	High match Vega Squadron; 16–19; Train	Mid match compLexity Gaming; 12–16; Inferno	Low match Gambit Esports; 16–8; Nuke	OpTic Gaming; 2–0
6–8	Vega Squadron	3–2	+10	Team Spirit; 16–14; Mirage	High match BIG; 19–16; Train	High match Team Liquid; 17–19; Cache	High match compLexity Gaming; 15–19; Inferno	North; 2–0
6–8	TyLoo	3–2	+8	Gambit Esports; 19–17; Inferno	High match Ninjas in Pyjamas; 16–12; Train	Mid match OpTic Gaming; 26–28; Inferno	Low match Renegades; 16–10; Inferno	Team Spirit; 2–0
9–11	North	2–3	−4	HellRaisers; 17–19; Overpass	Low match Team Spirit; 13–16; Nuke	Low match Virtus.pro; 16–6; Mirage	Low match Rogue; 25–23; Inferno	Vega Squadron; 0–2
9–11	Team Spirit	2–3	−6	Vega Squadron; 14–16; Mirage	Low match North; 16–13; Nuke	Mid match Rogue; 16–4; Overpass	High match Astralis; 3–16; Dust II	TyLoo; 0–2
9–11	OpTic Gaming	2–3	−21	Team Liquid; 4–16; Mirage	Low match Virtus.pro; 16–13; Mirage	Mid match TyLoo; 28–26; Inferno	High match HellRaisers; 23–25; Train	BIG; 0–2
12–14	Gambit Esports	1–3	−6	Tyloo; 17–19; Inferno	Low match Renegades; 16–10; Train	Mid match HellRaisers; 14–16; Overpass	Low match BIG; 8–16; Nuke	Eliminated
12–14	Rogue	1–3	−11	Space Soldiers; 16–10; Inferno	High match Astralis; 13–16; Inferno	Mid match Team Spirit; 4–16; Overpass	Low match North; 23–25; Inferno	Eliminated
12–14	Renegades	1–3	−18	BIG; 6–16; Overpass	Low match Gambit Esports; 10–16; Train	Low match Space Soldiers; 19–15; Inferno	Low match TyLoo; 10–16; Inferno	Eliminated
15–16	Space Soldiers	0–3	−15	Rogue; 10–16; Inferno	Low match compLexity Gaming; 11–16; Inferno	Low match Renegades; 15–19; Inferno	Eliminated	Eliminated
15–16	Virtus.pro	0–3	−24	Ninjas in Pyjamas; 5–16; Mirage	Low match OpTic Gaming; 13–16; Mirage	Low match North; 6–16; Mirage	Eliminated	Eliminated

Round 5 scores
Team	Score	Map	Score	Team
Team Spirit	12	Overpass	16	TyLoo
Team Spirit	23	Inferno	25	TyLoo
Team Spirit	–	Mirage	–	TyLoo
OpTic Gaming	6	Dust II	16	BIG
OpTic Gaming	14	Train	16	BIG
OpTic Gaming	–	Nuke	–	BIG
Vega Squadron	16	Inferno	8	North
Vega Squadron	16	Mirage	13	North
Vega Squadron	–	Train	–	North

== New Legends stage ==
The New Legends stage, formerly known as the Group stage, used the same format as the Challengers stage. This stage takes place from September 12 to September 16, 2018.

Cloud9, FaZe Clan, Natus Vincere, and MIBR were teams in pool one based on their top four placement at the Boston Major. Fnatic, G2 Esports, mousesports, and Winstrike Team were teams in pool two based on their quarterfinals finish at the Boston Major. Team Liquid and Ninjas in Pyjamas were placed in a third pool for going undefeated in the New Challengers stage. Astralis, compLexity Gaming, and HellRaisers were in a fourth pool after going 3–1. BIG, TyLoo, and Vega Squadron were in a fifth pool for going 3–2. The two teams in pool three were randomly drawn to play two teams from pool two. Two randomly selected teams from pool four were drawn to play the other two teams from pool two. The remaining team from pool four was matched against a randomly selected team from pool one. The three teams from pool five were randomly selected to play a randomly selected team from the three remaining teams in pool one.

Place	Team	Record	RD	Round 1	Round 2	Round 3	Round 4	Round 5
1–2	compLexity Gaming	3–0	+25	Fnatic; 16–4; Inferno	High match G2 Esports; 16–11; Cache	High match BIG; 16–8; Nuke	New Champions stage	New Champions stage
1–2	Team Liquid	3–0	+19	Winstrike Team; 16–7; Mirage	High match Ninjas in Pyjamas; 16–10; Mirage	High match Astralis; 19–15; Inferno	New Champions stage	New Champions stage
3–5	Astralis	3–1	+26	Natus Vincere; 16–14; Inferno	High match Vega Squadron; 16–4; Inferno	High match Team Liquid; 15–19; Inferno	High match MIBR; 16–0; Dust II	New Champions stage
3–5	Natus Vincere	3–1	+19	Astralis; 14–16; Inferno	Low match FaZe Clan; 16–12; Overpass	Mid match Ninjas in Pyjamas; 16–6; Train	High match Fnatic; 16–9; Mirage	New Champions stage
3–5	BIG	3–1	+19	FaZe Clan; 16–5; Dust II	High match TyLoo; 16–7; Train	High match compLexity Gaming; 8–16; Nuke	High match HellRaisers; 16–9; Train	New Champions stage
6–8	FaZe Clan	3–2	+22	BIG; 5–16; Dust II	Low match Natus Vincere; 12–16; Overpass	Low match mousesports 16–8; Mirage	Low match TyLoo; 16–4; Mirage	G2 Esports; 2–0
6–8	HellRaisers	3–2	+19	G2 Esports; 20–22; Dust II	Low match Cloud9; 19–16; Overpass	Mid match TyLoo; 16–10; Overpass	High match BIG; 9–16; Train	Fnatic; 2–1
6–8	MIBR	3–2	+6	TyLoo; 13–16; Inferno	Low match mousesports 16–6; Dust II	Mid match G2 Esports; 16–4; Inferno	High match Astralis; 0–16; Dust II	Ninjas in Pyjamas; 2–1
9–11	Ninjas in Pyjamas	2–3	−10	mousesports 16–12; Mirage	High match Team Liquid; 10–16; Mirage	Mid match Natus Vincere; 6–16; Train	Low match Vega Squadron; 16–11; Train	MIBR; 1–2
9–11	Fnatic	2–3	−27	compLexity Gaming; 4–16; Inferno	Low match Winstrike Team; 16–7; Inferno	Mid match Vega Squadron; 16–14; Inferno	High match Natus Vincere; 9–16; Mirage	HellRaisers; 1–2
9–11	G2 Esports	2–3	−29	HellRaisers; 22–20; Dust II	High match compLexity Gaming; 11–16; Cache	Mid match MIBR; 4–16; Inferno	Low match Cloud9; 22–19; Inferno	FaZe Clan; 0–2
12–14	Vega Squadron	1–3	−7	Cloud9; 16–4; Mirage	High match Astralis; 4–16; Inferno	Mid match Fnatic; 14–16; Inferno	Low match Ninjas in Pyjamas; 11–16; Train	Eliminated
12–14	Cloud9	1–3	−15	Vega Squadron; 4–16; Mirage	Low match HellRaisers; 16–19; Overpass	Low match Winstrike Team; 19–16; Inferno	Low match G2 Esports; 19–22; Inferno	Eliminated
12–14	TyLoo	1–3	−24	MIBR; 16–13; Inferno	High match BIG; 7–16; Train	Mid match HellRaisers; 10–16; Overpass	Low match FaZe Clan; 4–16; Mirage	Eliminated
15–16	Winstrike Team	0–3	−21	Team Liquid; 7–16; Mirage	Low match Fnatic; 7–16; Inferno	Low match Cloud9; 16–19; Inferno	Eliminated	Eliminated
15–16	mousesports	0–3	−22	Ninjas in Pyjamas; 12–16; Mirage	Low match MIBR; 6–16; Dust II	Low match FaZe Clan; 8–16; Mirage	Eliminated	Eliminated

Round 5 Scores
Team	Score	Map	Score	Team
Fnatic	19	Mirage	17	HellRaisers
Fnatic	9	Dust II	16	HellRaisers
Fnatic	2	Cache	16	HellRaisers
G2 Esports	2	Mirage	16	FaZe Clan
G2 Esports	22	Dust II	25	FaZe Clan
G2 Esports	–	Overpass	–	FaZe Clan
Ninjas in Pyjamas	15	Cache	19	MIBR
Ninjas in Pyjamas	16	Mirage	10	MIBR
Ninjas in Pyjamas	11	Train	16	MIBR

== New Champions stage ==
The New Champions Stage was a best-of-three single elimination bracket, with teams playing until a winner was decided. This stage took place at the Wembley Arena between September 20, 2018 and September 23, 2018. Brackets were revealed shortly after MIBR defeated NIP in the last map of the group stages. Teams were seeded first based on their record in the New Legends stage and then based on strength of schedule.

=== Bracket ===
Quarterfinals
1	Complexity	4	12	–	0
8	MIBR	16	16	–	2
5	BIG Clan	2	6	–	0
4	Natus Vincere	16	16	–	2
2	Team Liquid	16	10	16	2
7	HellRaisers	10	16	8	1
3	Astralis	16	16	–	2
6	FaZe Clan	14	12	–	0

Semifinals
8	MIBR	10	5	–	0
4	Natus Vincere	16	16	–	2
2	Team Liquid	8	7	–	0
3	Astralis	16	16	–	2

Finals
4	Natus Vincere	6	9	–	0
3	Astralis	16	16	–	2

=== Quarterfinals ===
==== BIG vs. Natus Vincere ====
Casters: James Bardolph & ddk

BIG vs. Natus Vincere Scores
Team	Score	Map	Score	Team
BIG	2	Dust II	16	Natus Vincere
BIG	6	Nuke	16	Natus Vincere
BIG	–	Overpass	–	Natus Vincere

==== compLexity Gaming vs. MIBR ====
Casters: HenryG & Sadokist

compLexity Gaming vs. MIBR Scores
Team	Score	Map	Score	Team
compLexity Gaming	4	Train	16	MIBR
compLexity Gaming	12	Inferno	16	MIBR
compLexity Gaming	–	Cache	–	MIBR

==== Team Liquid vs. HellRaisers ====
Casters: HenryG & Vince Hill

Team Liquid vs. HellRaisers Scores
Team	Score	Map	Score	Team
Team Liquid	16	Mirage	10	HellRaisers
Team Liquid	10	Dust II	16	HellRaisers
Team Liquid	16	Cache	8	HellRaisers

==== Astralis vs. FaZe Clan ====
Casters: Anders Blume & moses

Astralis vs. FaZe Clan Scores
Team	Score	Map	Score	Team
Astralis	16	Mirage	14	FaZe Clan
Astralis	16	Inferno	12	FaZe Clan
Astralis	–	Overpass	–	FaZe Clan

=== Semifinals ===
==== Natus Vincere vs. MIBR ====
Casters: Anders Blume & moses

Natus Vincere vs. MIBR Scores
Team	Score	Map	Score	Team
Natus Vincere	16	Overpass	10	MIBR
Natus Vincere	16	Dust II	5	MIBR
Natus Vincere	–	Train	–	MIBR

==== Team Liquid vs. Astralis ====
Casters: HenryG & Sadokist

Team Liquid vs. Astralis Scores
Team	Score	Map	Score	Team
Team Liquid	8	Nuke	16	Astralis
Team Liquid	7	Mirage	16	Astralis
Team Liquid	–	Dust II	–	Astralis

=== Finals ===
Casters: James Bardolph & ddk

No official MVP was given, but HLTV.org deemed dev1ce as the MVP. Astralis became the fourth squad to win multiple Major titles.

Natus Vincere vs. Astralis Scores
Team	Score	Map	Score	Team
Natus Vincere	6	Nuke	16	Astralis
Natus Vincere	9	Overpass	16	Astralis
Natus Vincere	–	Inferno	–	Astralis

== Final standings ==
The final placings are shown below. In addition, the prize distribution, seed for the next major, roster, and coaches are shown. Each team's in-game leader is shown first.

Place	Prize Money	Team	Seed	Roster	Coach
1st	US$500,000	Astralis	IEM Katowice 2019 New Legends	gla1ve, dev1ce, dupreeh, Magisk, Xyp9x	zonic
2nd	US$150,000	Natus Vincere	IEM Katowice 2019 New Legends	Zeus, Edward, s1mple, electronic, flamie	kane
3rd – 4th	US$70,000	MIBR	IEM Katowice 2019 New Legends	FalleN, coldzera, fer, Stewie2K, tarik	YNk
3rd – 4th	US$70,000	Team Liquid	IEM Katowice 2019 New Legends	nitr0, ELiGE, NAF, Twistzz, TACO	zews
5th – 8th	US$35,000	BIG	IEM Katowice 2019 New Legends	gob b, nex, tabseN, tiziaN, smooya	LEGIJA
5th – 8th	US$35,000	compLexity Gaming	IEM Katowice 2019 New Legends	stanislaw, ANDROID, ShahZaM, yay, dephh	Rambo
5th – 8th	US$35,000	FaZe Clan	IEM Katowice 2019 New Legends	karrigan, GuardiaN, NiKo, olofmeister, rain	RobbaN
5th – 8th	US$35,000	HellRaisers	IEM Katowice 2019 New Legends	ANGE1, bondik, DeadFox, woxic, ISSAA	Johnta
9th – 11th	US$8,750	Fnatic	IEM Katowice 2019 New Challengers	Xizt, draken, flusha, JW, KRiMZ	Jumpy
9th – 11th	US$8,750	G2 Esports	IEM Katowice 2019 New Challengers	Ex6TenZ, bodyy, kennyS, shox, SmithZz	NiaK
9th – 11th	US$8,750	Ninjas in Pyjamas	IEM Katowice 2019 New Challengers	Lekr0, dennis, f0rest, GeT RiGhT, REZ	pita
12th – 14th	US$8,750	Cloud9	IEM Katowice 2019 New Challengers	Golden, autimatic, RUSH, Skadoodle, STYKO	valens
12th – 14th	US$8,750	TyLoo	IEM Katowice 2019 New Challengers	BnTeT, captainMo, DD, somebody, xccurate	CruSad3
12th – 14th	US$8,750	Vega Squadron	IEM Katowice 2019 New Challengers	jR, chopper, hutji, tonyblack, crush	Fierce
15th – 16th	US$8,750	mousesports	–	chrisJ, ropz, oskar, Snax, suNny	lmbt
15th – 16th	US$8,750	Winstrike Team	–	waterfaLLZ, balbina, Boombl4, jmqa, Kvik	iksou
17th – 19th	–	North	–	MSL, aizy, Kjaerbye, niko, v4lde	ave
17th – 19th	–	OpTic Gaming	–	Snappi, cajunb, gade, JUGi, k0nfig	ruggah
17th – 19th	–	Team Spirit	–	S0tF1k, DavCost, Dima, COLDYY1, somedieyoung	Certus
20th – 22nd	–	Gambit Esports	–	Dosia, AdreN, HObbit, mou, mir	B1ad3
20th – 22nd	–	Renegades	–	Nifty, AZR, jks, USTILO, jkaem	Ryu
20th – 22nd	–	Rogue	–	Rickeh, Hiko, SicK, vice, cadiaN	mCe
23rd – 24th	–	Space Soldiers	–	hardstyle, Calyx, MAJ3R, paz, XANTARES	
23rd – 24th	–	Virtus.pro	–	NEO, byali, MICHU, pashaBiceps, snatchie	kuben

=== Post-Major rankings ===
The rankings shown below reflect the September 24, 2018 rankings, the first ranking after the Major.

HLTV.org post-major ranking

World ranking
Place	Team	Points	Move^{1}
1	Astralis	1000	Steady
2	Natus Vincere	734	Steady
3	Team Liquid	504	Steady
4	MIBR	415	▲3
5	FaZe Clan	413	▲1
6	North	387	▼2
7	mousesports	326	▼2
8	BIG	318	▲3
9	Ninjas in Pyjamas	277	▼1
10	HellRaisers	212	▲5
11	compLexity Gaming	182	▲18
12	TyLoo	180	Steady
14	Fnatic	130	▼4
15	G2 Esports	129	▼1
18	Vega Squadron	114	▲193
20	Gambit Esports	92	▼1
21	Cloud9	87	Steady
23	Renegades	83	▼7
24	OpTic Gaming	82	▼7
28	Virtus.pro	66	▼8
34	Team Spirit	–	▲2
35	Rogue	–	▼5
39	Space Soldiers	–	▼8
–	Winstrike Team^{2}	–	–

^{1}Change since September 3, 2018 ranking

^{2}Winstrike Team released four players. HLTV.org requires at least three members of a team to be included in the rankings.
