= Magisk (gamer) =

Danish esports player (born 1998)

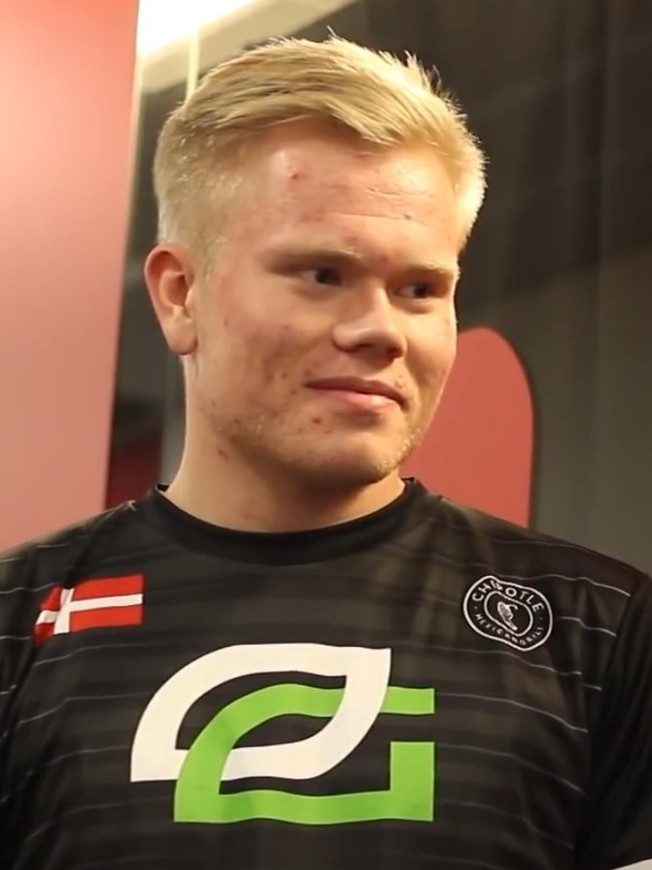
- Magisk with OpTic Gaming in 2017

Personal information
- Name: Emil Reif
- Born: 5 March 1998 (age 28)
- Nationality: Danish

Current team
- Team: BC.Game esports
- Role: Rifler (In-Game Leader)
- Game(s): Counter-Strike: Global Offensive; Counter-Strike 2

Career information
- Playing career: 2015–present

Team history
- 2015–2016: SK Gaming
- 2017: North
- 2017: OpTic Gaming
- 2018–2021: Astralis
- 2022–2023: Team Vitality
- 2023–2025: Team Falcons
- 2025–2026: Astralis
- 2026–Present: BC.Game esports

Career highlights and awards
- 4× CS:GO Major champion (London 2018, Katowice 2019, Berlin 2019, Paris 2023); IEM Grand Slam champion (Season 1); 5× HLTV Top 20 Player of the Year (2016, 2018, 2019, 2020, 2023); HLTV Major MVP (Katowice 2019); HLTV MVP

Emil Hoffmann Reif (born 5 March 1998), better known as Magisk (formerly Magiskb0Y), is a Danish professional Counter-Strike 2 player for BC.Game. He has won four majors in total, three in a row, a record he achieved with Astralis.

== Career ==
=== 2015–2016 ===
Magisk started his career floating around low-level Danish teams, before joining SK Gaming along with Andreas "MODDII" Fridh, Asger "AcilioN" Larsen, Michael "Friis" Jørgensen, and Casper "cadiaN" Møller. The team was not very successful together, however, and the roster was soon dropped in favour of the Brazilian Luminosity Gaming. Magisk eventually transferred to Dignitas, replacing Jesper "TENZKI" Plougmann, and joining Mathias "MSL" Lauridsen, Kristian "k0nfig" Wienecke, René "cajunb" Borg, and Ruben "RUBINO" Villarroel. The team found moderate success, culminating in a win at EPICENTER 2016. Magisk won an EVP at the event, and ended up on the HLTV top 20 players of the year, being nominated for 14th place.

=== 2017 ===
In early 2017, Dignitas was signed by F.C. Copenhagen in a new team known as North. After signing aizy in place of RUBINO, the team would struggle to find success. In July, North elected to replace Magisk with Valdemar "valde" Bjørn Vangså as the former's form declined after the addition of aizy and ensuing change of roles within the team. Magisk joined OpTic's new European roster, which was formed off of other benched players from European rosters.

=== 2018–2019 ===
Optic found little success, and in early January, Magisk was signed by Denmark's number one team at that time, Astralis. Despite questions regarding the signing at the time, Magisk turned out to be the player Astralis needed for success. Astralis went on to win 12 events in 2018 and early 2019, including 2 majors and the Intel Grand Slam, and following this, many people described Astralis as the greatest CS:GO team of all time. For Magisk, who was the 3rd best player on Astralis, 2018 was another very good individual year, and he received the 7th spot on HLTV's top 20. Magisk became the 14th major MVP from HLTV at the IEM Katowice 2019 Major.

=== 2021 ===
Magisk left Astralis in December 2021, along with Peter "dupreeh" Rasmussen and coach Danny "zonic" Sørensen.

=== 2022 ===
On 5 January 2022, Team Vitality announced the signing of Magisk, along with Peter "dupreeh" Rasmussen and Danny "zonic" Sørensen.

=== 2023–2025 ===
On 3 November 2023, Magisk left Team Vitality. Before leaving the team, it was rumoured that he was going to be signed by Team Falcons. On 16 December 2023, Team Falcons announced the signing of Magisk and 2 other players: Alvaro ”SunPayus” García and Pavle "Maden" Bošković. On 23 July 2025, Magisk was benched and shortly thereafter replaced with Maksim “Kyousuke” Lukin. On 1 September 2025, Magisk was released from his contract and, he returned to Astralis.

== Individual awards ==
- MVP of BLAST Pro Series: Lisbon 2018
- MVP of IEM Katowice Major 2019
- HLTV Top 20 Players: 14th (2016), 7th (2018), 5th (2019), 11th (2020), 17th (2023)
