= Rain (gamer) =

Norwegian esports player (born 1994)

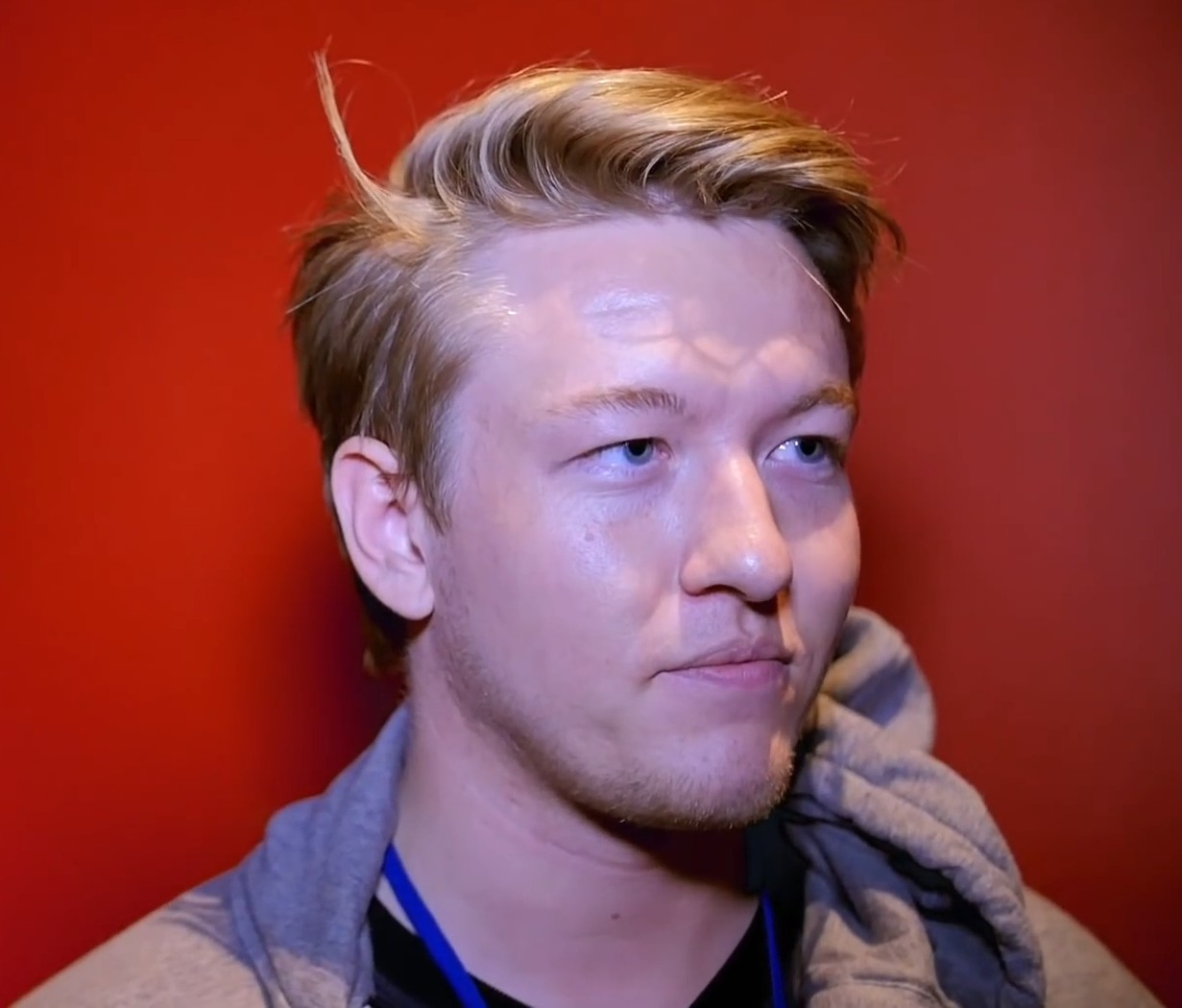
- Nygaard during ESL One Cologne 2015

Personal information
- Name: Håvard Nygaard
- Born: 27 August 1994 (age 32)
- Nationality: Norwegian

Current team
- Team: 100 Thieves
- Game: Counter-Strike 2

Career information
- Games: Counter-Strike: Global Offensive; Counter-Strike 2
- Playing career: 2013–present

Team history
- 2014–2015: LGB eSports
- 2015: Team Kinguin
- 2015–2016: G2 Esports
- 2016–2025: FaZe Clan (Note: Benched from September 29, 2025 to November 13, 2025.)
- 2025–present: 100 Thieves

Career highlights and awards
- CS:GO Major champion (Antwerp 2022); HLTV Major MVP (Antwerp 2022); IEM Grand Slam champion (Season 4); 16× HLTV "Big Event" Champion; 3× HLTV Top 20 Player of the Year (2017-2018, 2022); 4× HLTV MVP

Håvard Nygaard (born 27 August 1994), better known as Rain, is a Norwegian professional Counter-Strike 2 player for 100 Thieves. He is best known for his time on FaZe Clan, where he was the longest lasting member of any Counter-Strike: Global Offensive lineup, having played since the team first formed under the Team Kinguin banner in 2015.

== Career ==
=== Early career (2014) ===
Rain entered the Counter-Strike: Global Offensive pro scene following years at the semi-professional level, moving between Norwegian teams including partyastronauts and LGB.

=== Team Kinguin / G2 Esports (2015–2016) ===
In May 2015 he was hired by Team Kinguin, one of the first organizations to experiment with international rosters. This team peaked with a quarterfinal placement at the major tournament ESL One Cologne 2015 where they lost to Team SoloMid. Following this promising showing the roster was picked up by G2 Esports, due in part to Kinguin's withdrawal from esports. The team again made quarterfinals at a major, this time DreamHack Open Cluj-Napoca 2015, losing to eventual winners Team EnVyUs.

=== FaZe Clan (2016–2025) ===
The roster was again bought, this time by FaZe Clan for a record-breaking $700,000, but by this point, many of the players from the original international Kinguin lineup had been replaced, with only the core trio remaining. Under the FaZe banner, this trend continued with eventually all of the roster being replaced except for Rain, with the roster first gaining success with victory at Starseries' Sl i-league season 3 in April 2017.

Rain performed admirably but the roster failed to repeat success, leading to more team changes until the team ended up with possibly the most talent dense team to date. Whilst this team had early success, with two back to back flawless victories at the ELEAGUE CS:GO Premier 2017 and ESL One New York 2017, the team did not manage to find consistency and was largely considered relatively dysfunctional following a 2nd-place finish at the 2018 Boston ELEAGUE Major.

In late 2020, long-standing superstar teammate NiKo left the roster, with Twistzz coming in to take his place. Multiple mediocre results led to FaZe dropping to their lowest ever ranking. It was named the HLTV's 39th best team in the world in June 2021.

Rain won his first major championship at the PGL Major Antwerp 2022 with FaZe Clan, and was named the tournament's MVP.

In September 2025, Rain was benched from the starting roster.

=== 100 Thieves (2025–present) ===
On November 13, 2025, Rain signed with 100 Thieves.

== Awards and recognition ==
- Ranked the 4th best player of 2017, 18th best player of 2018, and 13th best player of 2022 by HLTV.org.
- Named the MVP of 4 different tournaments, including the PGL Major Antwerp 2022.
