= Intel Extreme Masters Fall 2021 Europe =

IEM Fall 2021 Europe
Tournament information
- Sport: Counter-Strike: Global Offensive
- Location: Quality Hotel Globe, Stockholm, Sweden
- Dates: September 29–October 10, 2021
- Administrator: ESL
- Format: Round-robin group stage Single elimination brackets
- Teams: 24
- Purse: US$105,000

Final positions
- Champions: Ninjas in Pyjamas
- Runner-up: ENCE
- MVP: Nicolai "dev1ce" Reedtz

Intel Extreme Masters Fall 2021 Europe (IEM Fall 2021 EU) was a Counter-Strike: Global Offensive (CSGO) tournament organized by German company ESL and sponsored by American corporation Intel. Part of the sixteenth season of Intel Extreme Masters and one of the six events under the IEM Fall 2021 tournament, the event was used by Valve as the final Regional Major Ranking (RMR) event, to determine the participants of the PGL Major Stockholm 2021. Twenty-four teams competed for a US$105,000 prize pool, eleven spots at the major and for 2015 ESL Pro Tour Points, used by the organizer to determine the participants of its two main events each year—IEM Katowice and Cologne.

The event was preceded by four qualifier events starting on August 28, which culminated in the Closed qualifier on September 18, determining the final twelve participants for event. The event started on September 29, with the group stage, where the teams were split equal between four groups. The two best performing teams of each group advanced to the quarterfinals. The final saw Swedish team Ninjas in Pyjamas (NIP) overpower European squad ENCE, 3–1. NIP's Nicolai "dev1ce" Reedtz, was named the MVP by both HLTV and ESL.

== Background ==
Intel Extreme Masters Fall 2021 was a series of six individual tournaments, held in six regions of the world—Asia, the CIS (Commonwealth of Independent States), Europe, North America, Oceania, South America. The European imprint of the tournament was held between September 29 and October 10, 2021, on LAN in Stockholm, Sweden. Twenty-four teams, twelve invited, with the other twelve qualifieng through a series of qualifiers, competing for US$105,000, 2015 ESL Pro Tour Points and nearly 19,000 regional major ranking points. It was the third and final Valve-sanctioned event of the year, to determine the participants of the sixteenth CSGO Major Championships, the PGL Major Stockholm 2021 and the first since the Berlin major in September 2019, due to the COVID-19 pandemic.

Eight days prior, Valve released CSGO's eleventh Operation, Riptide, alongside two gameplay changes. Firstly, they blocked the visibility at the middle position on the map Dust 2 and made grenades dropable, a feature previously only available to all guns in the game. Due to the nature of IEM Fall 2021 being a Valve sanctioned event, it had to be played on the new patch including these changes.

== Broadcast talent ==
Desk hosts

- Tres "stunna" Saranthus

Analyst

- Adam "Dinko" Hawthorne
- Janko "YNk" Paunović

Commentators

- Alex "Machine" Richardson
- Chad "SPUNJ" Burchill

Interviewer

- Pala Gilroy Sen

Observers

- Alexander "Rushly" Rush
- Bastian "UnknownFME" Faber
- Jake "Jak3y" Elton
- Ryan "ItsRandall" Randall
- Michael "MC" Campagna

== Qualifiers ==
Date	No.	Teams advanced
August 28–29	1	MAD Lions; Fiend
September 2–3	2	Copenhagen Flames; Movistar Riders
September 4–5	3	Endpoint; AURA
September 9–10	4	SAW; OPAA

Intel Extreme Masters Fall 2021 Europe was preceded by four, open qualifier events, in which two teams each could advance to the closed qualifier, to determine the events finals twelve teams. The winners of the semi-finals, would advance to the closed qualifier. The first qualifier was held between August 28 and 29 and was won by European squad MAD Lions who overtook Polish team AVEZ 2-0 (16–12; 16-8) and Bulgarian team Fiend, which won against French LDLC 2–1, (16–7; 12–16; 16-6). In the second open qualifier, the Copenhagen Flames overtook Wisla Krakow 2-0 (16–11; 16–12), with Movistar Riders advancing, over cowana with a 2-0 (16–11; 16–12).

For the third open qualifier, more than "190 teams [have] signed up". Following three brackets, starting with a round of 64, sixteen teams again qualified, including LDLC and cowana, who previously failed in qualifier two. British team Endpoint won against Polish AVEZ, with a 2-0 (19–15; 16–7) and LDLC again could not make the cut, as they lost 2-0 (6–16; 13–16) to Swedish team AURA. The fourth and final open qualifier had more than 250 teams sign up and started with a round of 256, where more popular teams directly advanced to the round of 128. Portuguese SAW overtook Danish AaB 2-0 (16–10; 16–12). Danish OPPA narrowly won against Finnish HAVU in a 2–1, with the final map Inferno going to overtime; (16–14; 2–16; 22–20).

Through hundreds of teams, eight teams qualified for the closed and final qualifier for the event. The event started with a round of 16, where the winners of the individual matches would be qualified for IEM Fall 2021 Europe. The eight losing teams had to face each other in four more matches—Fiend, MAD Lions, fnatic and AURA, were the last teams to qualify.

== Competing teams ==
Invited

- Ninjas in Pyjamas
- Astralis
- Heroic
- OG
- mousesports
- Complexity Gaming
- DBL Poney
- FunPlus Phoenix
- Sprout
- G2 Esports
- BIG
- Team Vitality

Qualified

- AURA
- Copenhagen Flames
- Dignitas
- ENCE
- Endpoint
- Faze Clan
- Fiend
- fnatic
- MAD Lions
- Movistar Riders
- Sinners
- Skade

== Group stage ==
Group A
Pos	Team	W	L	
1	Copenhagen Flames	5	0	Advanced to playoffs
2	G2 Esports	4	1	Advanced to playoffs
3	BIG	2	3	Advanced to 9-12th place tiebreakers
4	mousesports	2	3	Eliminated
5	FunPlus Phoenix	2	3	Eliminated
6	AURA	0	5	Eliminated

Group B
Pos	Team	W	L	
1	Astralis	5	0	Advanced to playoffs
2	Movistar Riders	3	2	Advanced to playoffs
3	Heroic	3	2	Advanced to 9-12th place tiebreakers
4	Sinners Esports	3	2	Eliminated
5	Complexity Gaming	1	4	Eliminated
6	Endpoint	0	5	Eliminated

Group C
Pos	Team	W	L	
1	ENCE	4	1	Advanced to playoffs
2	Team Vitality	4	1	Advanced to playoffs
3	OG	3	2	Advanced to 9-12th place tiebreakers
4	Dignitas	2	3	Eliminated
5	MAD Lions	2	3	Eliminated
6	Sprout	0	5	Eliminated

Group D
Pos	Team	W	L	
1	Ninjas in Pyjamas	5	0	Advanced to playoffs
2	Team Fiend	3	2	Advanced to playoffs
3	FaZe Clan	3	2	Advanced to 9-12th place tiebreakers
4	Double Poney	2	3	Eliminated
5	SKADE	2	3	Eliminated
6	fnatic	0	5	Eliminated

== 9th-12th place decider ==
=== Bracket ===
Opening round
B	Heroic	17	9	—
A	BIG	19	16	—
C	OG	10	16	14
D	FaZe Clan	16	4	16

9th-place decider
A	BIG	9	4	—
D	FaZe Clan	16	16	—
11th-place decider
B	Heroic	11	8	—
C	OG	16	16	—

== Playoffs ==
=== Bracket ===
Quarterfinals
B	Astralis	16	16	—
D	Fiend	10	9	—
A	G2 Esports	8	16	18
C	ENCE	16	7	22
A	Copenhagen Flames	12	14	—
C	Team Vitality	16	16	—
D	Ninjas in Pyjamas	16	16	16
B	Movistar Riders	14	19	5

Semifinals
B	Astralis	4	7	—
C	ENCE	16	16	—
C	Team Vitality	16	9	2
D	Ninjas in Pyjamas	5	16	16

Finals
C	ENCE	8	16	14	6	—
D	Ninjas in Pyjamas	16	7	16	16	—

5th–8th-place deciders
A	G2 Esports	16	16	—
D	Fiend	12	2	—
B	Movistar Riders	19	16	—
A	Copenhagen Flames	17	8	—

5th-place decider
A	G2 Esports	16	8	14
B	Movistar Riders	10	16	16
7th-place decider
D	Fiend	16	25	—
A	Cop. Flames	19	28	—

=== Finals summary ===
The final of IEM Fall 2021 Europe started on October 10, 17:00 CET between Ninjas in Pyjamas and ENCE. NIP were already qualified as a legend for the major, while ENCE already accumulated enough points to start in the challengers category. The final was the sole match of the tournament to be played as a best of five. Due to the map pool being seven maps, the teams had to play most of the maps. NIP banned Vertigo, while ENCE did not want to play Inferno. NIP picked Overpass and Ancient, while ENCE chose Mirage and Nuke. Dust 2 was left over.

ENCE started map one, Overpass, strong with a win of the pistol round. NIP fought right back, killing their enemies for the next three rounds and the bomb exploding once. NIP closed out the first half with a 10–5. The second half started strong for ENCE who were able to eliminate the enemy team in the first three rounds. However, in round nineteen, NIP were able to turn the match around dominating ENCE for six consecutive weeks, winning the match 16–8. NIP's dev1ce lead all players with 26 kills, with ENCE's Spinx made 20 kills. On ENCE's first map pick Mirage, NIP heavily struggled against them. In the first half, NIP were only able to convert four rounds. The second started better for NIP winning the pistol and the following two rounds, but ENCE were able to win every round starting in round 19, ultimately ending the map with a 16–7 scoreline. The only member to have an above average HLTV rating was hampus with 1.25, while the entire ENCE squad had a rating above hampus'.

NIP went into their second map Ancient as the favorites, based on the team's performance on the map in EPL XIV and IEM Fall. The Ninjas won the first pistol round and the following two rounds, but ENCE were able to convert the first proper gun round to five consecutive wins, bringing the scoreline to 5–3. The remainder of the first half saw a back and forth, with the final score at half time being 8 to 7 for ENCE. With the win of the pistol round, ENCE used its momentum winning the first five rounds of half two. Through a win in round 21, NIP were able to pick up the pace evening bringing the scoreline to a 15–13. ENCE were able to convert the following round, but succumb to NIP in round thirty. On the fourth and final map Nuke, NIP went up to an incredible start, winning 11 out of the first four rounds. The second half started good for ENCE. While they lost the pistol round, they were able to convert a force buy in round 17 to another win the following round, bringing the score line to 6–12. NIP followed with pistol only eco round win and following round 19, ENCE looked overwhelmed and were not able to convert a single round in their favor again. NIP won Nuke 16–6, winning the series 3–1 over ENCE. Over the four map series, dev1ce achieved the most kills and had the highest HLTV rating, with 1.36.

== Post event ==
For winning IEM Fall 2021 Europe, Ninjas in Pyjamas received US$27,500 (26,1 %) of the prize pool. Through their performance, NIP received 2500 RMR points, for a total of 3988 points, making them Europe's best-performing team. NIP were also awarded with 500 EPT points, placing them eighth on the leaderboard for IEM Katowice 2022, with 1960 points NIP's AWPer Nicolai 'dev1ce' Reedtz was awarded the most valuable player (MVP) for the tournament, both by HLTV and ESL, his first since joining the Swedish squad in April 2021. For dev1ce it was the 29th major trophy, while REZ received his second one. For LNZ, Plopski and hampus it was the first one. NIP received one of the three Legends spot at the major; the other two were won by Vitality and G2.

Movistar Riders became the first Spanish squad to qualify for a CSGO major. On October 9, fnatic benched it's AWPer Jack 'JackinhO' Ström Mattsson, citing poor results in the last months. fnatic enlisted Owen 'smooya' Butterfield from Movistar Riders, before announcing his signing on October 15. On October 11, FunPlus Phoenix announced that Hunter 'Lucid' Tucker had left the organization, due to "time zone difference with the team, with the hours affecting his mental health and sleep schedule." According to eSports Charts, the tournament had an average viewership per series of 115,000.

== Final standings ==
	Team	Prize	RMR	PTP	Seed	Roster	Coach
1.	Ninjas in Pyjamas	US$27,500	2500	500	Legends	dev1ce, REZ, LNZ, Plopski, hampus	Threat
2.	ENCE	US$17,500	2344	350	Challengers	Snappi, doto, dycha, hades, Spinx	sAw
3.	Team Vitality	US$12,000	2188	225	Legends	shox, ZywOo, apEX, mistuaaa, Kyojin	XTQZZZ
4.	Astralis	US$9,000	2031	150	Challengers	Xyp9x, dupreeh, Magisk, Bubzkji, Lucky, gla1ve (Sub.)	zonic
5.	Movistar Riders	US$7,500	1875	110	Challengers	alex, mopoz, DeathZz, SunPayus, dav1g	bladE
6.	G2	US$6,500	1719	90	Legends	NiKo, hunter-, JaCkz, AmaNEk, nexa	maLeK
7.	Copenhagen Flames	US$5,500	1563	75	Contenders	HooXi, nicoodoz, roeJ, jabbi, Zyphon	pita
8.	Fiend	US$4,500	1406	65	Did not qualify	bubble, v1c7or, dream3r, REDSTAR, h4rn	None
9.	FaZe Clan	US$3,000	1250	60	Contenders	olofmeister, karrigan, Twistzz, rain, broky	RobbaN
10.	BIG	US$2,500	1094	55	Challengers	tabseN, tiziaN, syrsoN, k1t0, gade	LEGIJA
11.	OG	US$2,000	938	50	Did not qualify	valde, niko, mantuu, flameZ, Aleksib	ruggah
12.	Heroic	US$1,500	0	45	Challengers	cadian, stavn, refrezh, TeSeS, sjuush	None
13. – 16.	mousesports	US$1,000	0	40	Challengers	dexter, acoR, frozen, ropz, Bymas	mithR
13. – 16.	Sinners	US$1,000	0	40	Did not qualify	oskar, ZEDKO, beastik, SHOCK, NEOFRAG	Tomkeejs
13. – 16.	Dignitas	US$1,000	0	40	Did not qualify	f0rest, friberg, Lekr0, HEAP, hallzerk	vENdetta
13. – 16.	DBL Poney	US$1,000	0	40	Did not qualify	bodyy, Lucky, Djoko, Ex3rcice, afro	None
17. – 20.	FunPlus Phoenix	US$500	0	0	Did not qualify	Farlig, emi, zehN, STYKO, Maden	Devilwalk
17. – 20.	Complexity Gaming	US$500	0	0	Did not qualify	es3tag, blameF, jks, coldzera, poizon	peacemaker
17. – 20.	MAD Lions	US$500	0	0	Did not qualify	b0RUP, TMB, Worok2k, sausol, jL	kuben
17. – 20.	Skade	US$500	0	0	Did not qualify	SHiPZ, dennyslaw, KalubeR, Duplicate, Rainwaker	pNshr
21. – 24.	AURA	0	0	0	Did not qualify	zen, FRANNSON, SHiNE, hype, bobeksde	None
21. – 24.	Endpoint	0	0	0	Did not qualify	Thomas, Surreal, MiGHTYMAX, CRUC1AL, BOROS	Allan
21. – 24.	Sprout	0	0	0	Did not qualify	Spiidi, kreesy, faveN, slaxz-, raalz	enkay J
21. – 24.	fnatic	0	0	0	Did not qualify	KRIMZ, Brollan, Jackinho, ALEX, mezii	keita
