= PGL Major Stockholm 2021 =

Esports tournament

PGL Major 2021
- 2021
- The PGL Major Stockholm 2021 Logo

Tournament information
- Game: Counter-Strike: Global Offensive
- Location: Stockholm, Sweden
- Dates: October 26–November 7, 2021
- Administrator: Valve; PGL
- Tournament format(s): Two 16-team swiss-system group stages 8-team single-elimination playoff
- Venue: Avicii Arena
- Teams: 24 teams
- Defending champions: Astralis
- Purse: US$2,000,000

Final positions
- Champions: Natus Vincere
- 1st runners-up: G2 Esports
- 2nd runners-up: Gambit Esports; Heroic
- MVP: Oleksandr "s1mple" Kostyliev

The PGL Major Stockholm 2021, also known as PGL Major 2021 or Stockholm 2021, was the sixteenth Counter-Strike: Global Offensive (CS:GO) Major Championship. It was held in Stockholm, Sweden at the Avicii Arena from October 26 to November 7, 2021. Twenty-four teams qualified via regional major rankings. It featured a US$2,000,000 prize pool, a rise from the $1,000,000 of previous Majors due to the absence of offline competition amid the COVID-19 pandemic. It was the second Major hosted by the Romanian organization PGL, after PGL Major: Kraków 2017. Stockholm 2021 was the first Major after a break caused by the COVID-19 pandemic following the StarLadder Major: Berlin 2019. The Major was won by Natus Vincere, who did not lose a single map throughout the tournament.

== Background ==
Counter-Strike: Global Offensive is a multiplayer first-person shooter video game developed by Hidden Path Entertainment and Valve Corporation. It is the fourth game in the Counter-Strike series. In professional CS:GO, the Valve-sponsored Majors are the most prestigious tournaments.

The Stockholm Major was the first Major in two years following an absence in offline play in 2020 and 2021 due to the COVID-19 pandemic. Previously, the ESL One Rio Major 2020 was planned for May 2020, but was postponed to November, before later being canceled in September.

The defending champions were Astralis, who won their fourth Major at Berlin 2019. They were eliminated in the Legends stage after their loss to Team Vitality.

== Format ==
=== Map Pool ===
Between the Berlin 2019 Major and the Stockholm 2021 Major, Valve replaced Train in the active duty map pool with Ancient.

- Dust II
- Mirage
- Inferno
- Nuke
- Ancient
- Overpass
- Vertigo

=== Regional Major Ranking ===
On April 2, 2020, Valve revised the former major qualification system which featured direct qualifiers called minors, for a yearly circuit where teams had to earn Regional Major Ranking Points (RMR) in a series of tournaments. The system was revised in scope of the first postponement of the Rio Major. In early January 2021, Valve reached out to organizers for proposals of three RMR events per region–Asia, CIS, Europe, North America, South America and Oceania. Five days later, the corporation released the 2020 RMR Sticker capsule as an in-game item, including the team's logos as sticker who qualified for Rio. They furthermore reset all the points acquired and reset the leaderboard. As a compensation, teams who qualified as a Legend for the Rio Major were awarded with 600 points, Challengers with 300 and Contenders with 100. Through the rules laid out by Valve, teams were able to replace up to two members of their roster at a time for a penalty. Teams lost 20% of their points per player change. If three or more players were removed from the team, the points would be reset. At least two RMR events per region were required with an optional third one being possible. The only regions to have three RMR events were CIS and South America.

==== Tournaments ====
List of RMR tournaments
Region	Events	RMR	Dates	Ref.
Asia	Perfect World League Season 1 (2021/1)	5800	April 20 – May 3, 2021	
Asia	IEM Fall 2021 Asia (2021/2)	9063	October 5–10, 2021	
CIS	EPIC League CIS 2021 (2021/1)	10000	May 12 – June 1, 2021	
CIS	StarLadder CIS RMR 2021 (2021/2)	8750	June 27 – July 4, 2021	
CIS	IEM Fall 2021 CIS (2021/3)	10938	September 29 – October 3, 2021	
Europe	Flashpoint Season 3 (2021/1)	13600	May 10–30, 2021	
Europe	IEM Fall 2021 Europe (2021/2)	18908	September 29 – October 10, 2021	
North America	cs_summit 8 (2021/1)	10000	May 20–30, 2021	
North America	IEM Fall 2021 North America (2021/2)	10938	October 5–10, 2021	
Oceania	EPIC League Oceania 2021 (2021/1)	5800	May 24–30, 2021	
Oceania	IEM Fall 2021 South America (2021/2)	9063	September 29 – October 3, 2021	
South America	CBCS Elite League Season 1 (2021/1)	10000	April 22 – May 16, 2021	
South America	CBCS Elite League Season 2 (2021/2)	6900	July 21 – August 8, 2021	
South America	IEM Fall 2021 South America (2021/3)	9063	September 29 – October 3, 2021	

==== RMR standings ====
Asia
Teams	2020	2021/1	2021/2	Total	Seed
Tyloo	100	1500	2500	4100	Contenders
ViCi	—	1600	2344	3944	Did not qualify
Team NKT	—	—	2188	2188	Did not qualify
Checkmate	—	—	2031	2031	Did not qualify
Invictus	—	1400 (Note: July 9: Invictus part ways with Starry; August 17: Invictus sign rage (−280))	—	1120	Did not qualify
Wings Up	—	1300 (Note: July 6: Wings Up replace DD with ayaya (−260))	—	1040	Did not qualify

Oceania
Teams	2020	2021/1	2021/2	Total	Seed
Renegades	100 (Note: February 2021: Renegades replace dexter with aliStair (−20))	1600	2500	4180	Contenders
ORDER	—	1500	2188	3688	Did not qualify
LookingForOrg	—	1300 (Note: July 2021: LookingForOrg, at the time still under the Dire Wolves name replace soju_j with apoc (−260))	2344	3384	Did not qualify
VERTEX	—	—	2031	2031	Did not qualify
Rooster	—	1400	—	895	Did not qualify

CIS
Teams	2020	2021/1	2021/2	2021/3	Total	Seed
Natus Vincere	600 (Note: January: B1T joins the roster for flamie (−120))	1200	2000	2344	6024	Legends
Gambit Esports	—	1600	1875	2500	5975	Legends
Team Spirit	600 (Note: January 21: iDISBALANCE is replaced with degster (−120))	1300	1750	1875	5405	Challengers
Virtus.pro	100	1500	—	2031	3631	Contenders
Entropiq	—	1100	—	2188	3288	Contenders
K23	—	950	1625	—	2575	Did not qualify
forZe	—	950	1500	—	2450	Did not qualify
Akuma	—	—	1400	—	1400	Did not qualify
Nemiga	300 (Note: April 2: speed4k gets replaced with iDISBALANCE (−60))	—	— (Note: August 30: 1eeR replaces mdr (−48))	—	192	Did not qualify
Espada	100 (Note: January 11: degster and Patsi become inactive (−40))	—	—	—	60	Did not qualify

North America
Teams	2020	2021/1	2021/2	Total	Seed
FURIA	600 (Note: January 2021: Furia replace HEN1 with junior (−120))	1500 (Note: June 2021: junior gets replaced by drop (−396))	2500	4084	Legends
Team Liquid	300 (Note: January 2021: Twistzz gets replaced by FalleN (−120))	1600	2188	4028	Legends
Evil Geniuses	600 (Note: March 2021: Ethan retires and gets replaced by oBo; April 2021: tarik is benched and replaced by MICHU (−240))	950	1875	3185	Legends
paiN Gaming	—	1100	2031	3031	Challenger
Godsent	—	—	2344	2344	Contender
Extremum	600 (Note: January 2021: jks gets replaced by BnTet)	1400	—	1880	Did not qualify
00Nation	—	1300	—	1300	Did not qualify
Extra Salt	—	1200	—	1200	Did not qualify
Bad News Bears	—	950 (Note: May 2021: alter gets replaced by Shakezullah; August 2021: ptr gets replaced by junior)	—	570	Did not qualify
Gen.G	100 (Note: January 2021: BnTeT is removed from the roaster)	—	—	80	Did not qualify

South America
Teams	2020	2021/1	2021/2	2021/3	Total	Seed
Sharks Esports	—	1500	1875	2344	5719	Contenders
MIBR	100 (Note: January 2021: exit replaces felps (−20))	1600	1750	2188	5618	Did not qualify
Bravos Gaming	—	1300 (Note: June 2021: caike replaces Leomonster (−260))	2000 (Note: September: danoco replaces KaiG (−608))	2500	4932	Did not qualify
Paquetá Gaming	—	1400	1625	—	3025	Did not qualify
Imperial Esports	—	—	—	2031	2031	Did not qualify
Havan Liberty	—	1050 (Note: July: w1 is benched and replaced by skullz (−210))	—	—	840	Did not qualify
INTZ	—	1050 (Note: May: chara is replaced with DANVIET; July: dukka leaves the roaster (−420))	—	—	630	Did not qualify
Santos e-Sports	—	1050 (Note: August: Santos e-Sports remove their core roaster of xns, voltera, MaLLby (−1050))	—	—	0	Did not qualify
Meta Gaming	—	1050 (Note: May/June: Meta Gaming part ways with their core roaster of rushardo, 648, and restik (−1050))	—	—	0	Did not qualify

Europe
Teams	2020	2021/1	2021/2	Total	Seed
Ninjas In Pyjamas	600 (Note: January: twist is replaced with ztr; April: dev1ce replaces nawwk (−240))	1500 (Note: June: LNZ replaces ztr (−372))	2500	3988	Legends
Team Vitality	600 (Note: April: Kyojin replaces RPK (−120))	1000	2188	3668	Legends
G2 Esports	300 (Note: April: kennyS gets replaced with NiKo (−60))	1400	1719	3359	Legends
Astralis	300				Challengers
ENCE	—	—	2344	2344	Challengers
BIG	300	1200	1094	2294	Challengers
Movistar Riders	—	—	1875	1875	Challengers
Heroic	600	1300	—	1660	Challengers
mousesports	—	1600	—	1600	Challengers
Copenhagen Flames	—	—	1563	1563	Contenders
FaZe Clan	100	250	1250	1498	Contenders
Team Fiend	—	—	1406	1406	Did not qualify
OG	300 (Note: February/March: OG replace ISSAA with flameZ and NBK- with niko (−120))	250	938	1368	Did not qualify
FunPlus Phoenix	300 (Note: April: emi replaces krystal (−60))	800	—	1040	Did not qualify
DBL Poney	—	900 (Note: April 30: NBK leaves DPL Poney.; June: Ex3rcice joins the roaster as a stand-in. (−180))	—	720	Did not qualify
Sprout	—	600 (Note: July 29: denis leaves the team; August 12: raalz joins the team (−120))	—	480	Did not qualify
Complexity Gaming	—	700	—	420	Did not qualify
Anonymo	—	500	—	300	Did not qualify
fnatic	300	250	—	294	Did not qualify
HYENAS	100 (Note: January: Kjaerbye replaces Lekro; MSL replaces b0RUP (−40))	250 (Note: July: HYENAS lose their roaster (−310))	—	0	Did not qualify

== Teams competing ==
Legends

- Evil Geniuses
- FURIA Esports
- G2 Esports
- Gambit Esports
- Natus Vincere
- Ninjas in Pyjamas
- Team Liquid
- Team Vitality

Challengers

- Astralis
- BIG
- ENCE
- Heroic
- MOUZ
- Movistar Riders
- paiN Gaming
- Team Spirit

Contenders

- Copenhagen Flames
- Entropiq
- FaZe Clan
- GODSENT
- Renegades
- Sharks Esports
- TYLOO
- Virtus.pro

== New Challengers Stage ==
The New Challengers stage took place from October 26 to October 29, 2021, at the Avicii Arena. The Challengers stage, also known as the Preliminary stage and formerly known as the offline qualifier, is a sixteen team swiss tournament. Initial seeding was determined using RMR srandings, from the 3rd round forward the Buchholz system was used.

Pos	Team	RW	RL	RD	BH	W	L	Qualification
1	FaZe Clan	64	43	+21	3	3	0	Qualification to Legends Stage
2	Copenhagen Flames	75	52	+23	1	3	0	Qualification to Legends Stage
3	ENCE	86	71	+15	0	3	1	Qualification to Legends Stage
4	Entropiq	87	68	+19	0	3	1	Qualification to Legends Stage
5	Virtus.pro	99	96	+3	−1	3	1	Qualification to Legends Stage
6	Heroic	133	129	+4	3	3	2	Qualification to Legends Stage
7	Astralis	111	90	+21	−1	3	2	Qualification to Legends Stage
8	MOUZ	126	110	+16	−3	3	2	Qualification to Legends Stage
9	BIG	117	122	−5	6	2	3	Eliminated
10	Team Spirit	101	110	−9	1	2	3	Eliminated
11	Movistar Riders	103	123	−20	1	2	3	Eliminated
12	paiN Gaming	106	110	−4	−2	1	3	Eliminated
13	Renegades	70	92	−22	−3	1	3	Eliminated
14	TYLOO	77	88	−11	−4	1	3	Eliminated
15	GODSENT	36	64	−28	2	0	3	Eliminated
16	Sharks Esports	63	86	−23	−3	0	3	Eliminated

Updated to match(es) played on 29 October 2021. Source: HLTV
Round 1 scores

Round 1 matches
Team	Score	Map	Score	Team
Heroic	16	Inferno	L	L
MOUZ	16	Inferno	L	L
Movistar Riders	16	Nuke	L	L
BIG	16	Nuke	L	L
L	L	Inferno	16	Virtus.pro
ENCE	16	Nuke	L	L
L	L	Overpass	16	FaZe Clan
L	L	Overpass	16	Copenhagen Flames

Round 2 scores

Round 2 matches
Team	Score	Map	Score	Team
High division
L	L	Dust 2	16	FaZe Clan
L	L	Nuke	16	Copenhagen Flames
L	L	Vetrigo	16	Virtus.pro
Heroic	16	Nuke	11	MOUZ
Low division
—N/a

Round 3 scores

Round 3 matches
Team	Score	Map	Score	Team
—N/a

Round 4 scores

Round 4 matches
Team	Score	Map	Score	Team
—N/a

Round 5 scores

Round 5 matches
Team	Score	Map	Score	Team
—N/a

== New Legends Stage ==
- Top 8 Teams proceed to New Champions Stage
- Bottom 8 Teams are eliminated

Place	Team	Record	RD	Round 1	Round 2	Round 3	Round 4	Round 5
1–2	Natus Vincere	3–0	+31	Heroic; 16–11; Ancient	High match Virtus.pro; 16–4; Overpass	High match Ninjas in Pyjamas; 2–0	New Champions stage	New Champions stage
1–2	G2 Esports	3–0	+24	Copenhagen Flames; 16–11; Ancient	High match FaZe Clan; 16–7; Mirage	High match Entropiq; 2–0	New Champions stage	New Champions stage
3–5	Heroic	3–1	+22	L	Low match Team Vitality; 16–12; Overpass	Mid match Astralis; 16–7; Ancient	High match Copenhagen Flames; 2–1	New Champions stage
3–5	Gambit Esports	3–1	+17	ENCE; 16–7; Overpass	L	Mid match Virtus.pro; 16–14; Vertigo	High match Ninjas in Pyjamas; 2–0	New Champions stage
3–5	FURIA Esports	3–1	+3	L	High match MOUZ; 16–9; Inferno	Mid match Team Liquid; 16–9; Inferno	High match Entropiq; 2–1	New Champions stage
6–8	Team Vitality	3–2	+23	L	L	Low match Evil Geniuses; 2–1	Low match Astralis; 2–1	Entropiq; 2–1
6–8	Virtus.pro	3–2	+2	Team Vitality; 16–14; Inferno	L	L	Low match MOUZ; 2–1	FaZe Clan; 2–1
6–8	Ninjas in Pyjamas	3–2	−9	MOUZ; 16–12; Inferno	High match Astralis; 16–1; Inferno	L	L	Copenhagen Flames; 2–1
9–11	Copenhagen Flames	2–3	6	L	Low match Evil Geniuses; 16–2; Nuke	Mid match FaZe Clan; 16–6; Ancient	L	L
9–11	FaZe Clan	2–3	−2	Evil Geniuses; 16–6; Dust II	L	L	High match Team Liquid; 2–0	L
9–11	Entropiq	2–3	−12	Team Liquid; 16–9; Vertigo	High match Gambit Esports; 16–9; Vertigo	L	L	L
12–14	MOUZ	1–3	−5	L	L	Low match ENCE; 2–0	L	L
12–14	Team Liquid	1–3	−17	L	Low match ENCE; 16–8; Dust II	L	L	L
12–14	Astralis	1–3	−25	FURIA Esports; 16–10; Inferno	L	L	L	L
15–16	ENCE	0–3	−33	L	L	L	L	L
15–16	Evil Geniuses	0–3	−36	L	L	L	L	L

Round 1 scores

Round 1 matches
Team	Score	Map	Score	Team
—N/a

Round 2 scores

Round 2 matches
Team	Score	Map	Score	Team
High division
—N/a
Low division
—N/a

Round 3 scores

Round 3 matches
Team	Score	Map	Score	Team
—N/a

Round 4 scores

Round 4 matches
Team	Score	Map	Score	Team
—N/a

Round 5 scores

Round 5 matches
Team	Score	Map	Score	Team
—N/a

== New Champions Stage ==
With eight teams remaining, the final stage of the Major is a single-elimination bracket, with all matches played as best-of-3 maps.

=== Bracket ===
Quarterfinals
1	Natus Vincere	16	16	–	2
8	Team Vitality	11	13	–	0
5	FURIA Esports	17	10	–	0
4	Gambit Esports	19	16	–	2
3	Heroic	16	13	16	2
6	Virtus.pro	10	16	12	1
2	G2 Esports	16	16	–	2
7	Ninjas in Pyjamas	11	11	–	0

Semifinals
1	Natus Vincere	16	16	–	2
4	Gambit Esports	8	3	–	0
3	Heroic	16	10	15	1
2	G2 Esports	12	16	19	2

Finals
1	Natus Vincere	16	22	–	2
2	G2 Esports	11	19	–	0

=== Quarterfinals ===
==== Heroic vs. Virtus.pro ====
Casters: Semmler & moses

Virtus.pro vs. Heroic scores
Team	Score	Map	Score	Team
L	L	Mirage	16	Heroic
Virtus.pro	16	Ancient	L	L
L	L	Inferno	16	Heroic

==== G2 Esports vs. Ninjas in Pyjamas ====
Casters: Semmler & Anders

G2 Esports vs. Ninjas in Pyjamas scores
Team	Score	Map	Score	Team
G2 Esports	16	Inferno	L	L
G2 Esports	16	Mirage	L	L
G2 Esports	–	Ancient	–	Ninjas in Pyjamas

==== FURIA Esports vs. Gambit Esports ====
Casters: James Bardolph & ddk

FURIA Esports vs. Gambit Esports scores
Team	Score	Map	Score	Team
L	L	Inferno	19	Gambit Esports
L	L	Overpass	16	Gambit Esports
FURIA Esports	–	Mirage	–	Gambit Esports

==== Natus Vincere vs. Team Vitality ====
Casters: James Bardolph & ddk

Natus Vincere vs. Team Vitality scores
Team	Score	Map	Score	Team
Natus Vincere	16	Dust II	L	L
Natus Vincere	16	Nuke	L	L
Natus Vincere	–	Mirage	–	Team Vitality

=== Semifinals ===
==== Heroic vs. G2 Esports ====
Casters: Semmler & Anders

G2 Esports vs. Heroic scores
Team	Score	Map	Score	Team
L	L	Nuke	16	Heroic
G2 Esports	16	Mirage	L	L
G2 Esports	19	Inferno	L	L

==== Natus Vincere vs. Gambit Esports ====
Casters: Semmler & Moses

Natus Vincere vs. Gambit Esports scores
Team	Score	Map	Score	Team
Natus Vincere	16	Overpass	L	L
Natus Vincere	16	Mirage	L	L
Natus Vincere	–	Dust II	–	Gambit Esports

=== Finals ===
==== Natus Vincere vs. G2 Esports ====
Casters: Machine & SPUNJ

G2 Esports vs. Natus Vincere scores
Team	Score	Map	Score	Team
L	L	Ancient	16	Natus Vincere
L	L	Nuke	22	Natus Vincere
G2 Esports	–	Mirage	–	Natus Vincere

== Final standings ==
The final placings are shown below. In addition, the prize distribution, seed for the next major, roster, and coaches are shown.

Place	Prize Money	Team	Seed	Roster	Coach
1st	US$1,000,000	Natus Vincere	PGL Major Antwerp 2022 RMR	s1mple, electroNic, Boombl4, Perfecto, b1t	B1ad3
2nd	US$300,000	G2 Esports	PGL Major Antwerp 2022 RMR	JaCkz, AmaNEk, nexa, huNter-, NiKo	maLeK
3rd – 4th	US$140,000	Heroic	PGL Major Antwerp 2022 RMR	stavn, cadiaN, TeSeS, refrezh, sjuush	Xizt
3rd – 4th	US$140,000	Gambit Esports	PGL Major Antwerp 2022 RMR	nafany, sh1ro, Ax1Le, interz, HObbit	groove
5th – 8th	US$70,000	Team Vitality	PGL Major Antwerp 2022 RMR	apEX, ZywOo, shox, misutaaa, Kyojin	XTQZZZ
5th – 8th	US$70,000	FURIA Esports	PGL Major Antwerp 2022 RMR	yuurih, arT, VINI, KSCERATO drop	tacitus
5th – 8th	US$70,000	Virtus.Pro	PGL Major Antwerp 2022 RMR	buster, Qikert, Jame, YEKINDAR, FL1T	dastan
5th – 8th	US$70,000	Ninjas in Pyjamas	PGL Major Antwerp 2022 RMR	REZ, Plopski, hampus, dev1ce, LNZ	THREAT
9th – 11th	US$17,500	Entropiq	PGL Major Antwerp 2022 RMR	El1an, Lack1, NickelBack, Krad, Forester	hooch
9th – 11th	US$17,500	Copenhagen Flames	PGL Major Antwerp 2022 RMR	Jabbi, nicoodoz, roeJ, HooXi, Zyphon	vorborg
9th – 11th	US$17,500	FaZe Clan	PGL Major Antwerp 2022 RMR	rain, olofmeister, broky, Twistzz, karrigan	innersh1ne
12th – 14th	US$17,500	Astralis	PGL Major Antwerp 2022 RMR	dupreeh, Xyp9x, gla1ve, Magisk, Lucky	zonic
12th – 14th	US$17,500	MOUZ	PGL Major Antwerp 2022 RMR	ropz, frozen, Bymas, acoR, dexter	mithR
12th – 14th	US$17,500	Team Liquid	PGL Major Antwerp 2022 RMR	EliGE, NAF, Stewie2K, Grim, FalleN	jokasteve
15th – 16th	US$17,500	Evil Geniuses	–	Brehze, CeRq, stanislaw, oBo, MICHU	daps
15th – 16th	US$17,500	ENCE	–	doto, Snappi, Spinx, dycha, hades	sAw
17th – 19th	–	BIG	–	tabseN, tiziaN, syrsoN, k1to, gade	LEGIJA
17th – 19th	–	Movistar Riders	–	mopoz, ALEX, DeathZz, SunPayus, dav1g	bladE
17th – 19th	–	Team Spirit	–	chopper, mir, magixx, degster, sdy	Certus
20th – 22nd	–	paiN Gaming	–	PKL, biguzera, hardzao, NEKIZ, saffee	felippe1
20th – 22nd	–	Renegades	–	malta, Sico, INS, Hatz, aliStair	Kingfisher
20th – 22nd	–	TYLOO	–	somebody, Summer, Attacker, SLOWLY, DANK1NG	Karsa
23rd – 24th	–	GODSENT	–	TACO, felps, latto, b4rtiN, dumau	cky
23rd – 24th	–	Sharks Esports	–	jnt, pancc, Lucaozy, realziN, zevy	coachi
