= ESL One New York 2016 =

- 2016

Tournament information
- Sport: Counter-Strike: Global Offensive
- Location: New York, New York
- Dates: September 30, 2016–October 2, 2016
- Administrator: Electronic Sports League (ESL)
- Venue: Barclays Center
- Teams: 8 teams
- Purse: US$250,000

Final positions
- Champions: Natus Vincere
- 1st runners-up: Virtus.pro
- 2nd runners-up: SK Gaming; Team Liquid

Tournament statistics
- Attendance: 8,500
- MVP: Oleksandr "s1mple" Kostyliev

ESL One New York 2016 was a Counter-Strike: Global Offensive tournament run by ESL. Eight teams from around the globe competed in an offline (LAN) tournament that will feature a group stage and a playoffs. It featured a US$250,000 prize pool.

== Format ==
ESL invited six teams to compete in ESL One New York. One team from the European Qualifier and one team from the North American Qualifier will also have a ticket to the tournament. Both qualifiers are played online.

The group stage played in a best-of-one Swiss-system tournament format consisting of 5 rounds, much like the ESL One Cologne 2016 Qualifier. In the end, the top four teams will advance to the Playoffs.

The Playoffs were formatted in a four team, best-of-three, single elimination bracket.

== Broadcast Talent ==
Stage Hosts

- Paul "ReDeYe" Chaloner
- Alex "Machine" Richardson

Analysts

- Janko "YNk" Paunović
- Duncan "Thorin" Shields

Commentators

- Anders Blume
- Chad "SPUNJ" Burchill
- Hugo Byron
- Henry "HenryG" Greer
- Mitch "Uber" Leslie
- Joona "natu" Leppänen
- John "BLU" Mullen
- Jason "moses" O'Toole
- Matthew "Sadokist" Trivett

Observers

- DJ "Prius" Kuntz
- Alex "Rushly" Rush
- Kevin "kVIN_S" Swift

== Qualifiers ==
In each qualifier, one team will move on to the main tournament.

=== Europe Qualifier ===
Quarterfinals
GODSENT	16	3	4
FaZe Clan	4	16	16
Gambit Gaming	9	12	–
mousesports	16	16	–
Team EnVyUs	19	16	–
Flipsid3 Tactics	17	7	–
Team Dignitas	16	10	9
Astralis	11	16	16

Semifinals
FaZe Clan	16	16	–
mousesports	12	7	–
Team EnVyUs	5	16	12
Astralis	16	8	16

Finals
FaZe Clan	10	5	–
Astralis	16	16	–

=== North America Qualifier ===
Quarterfinals
Counter Logic Gaming	13	14	–
Cloud9	16	16	–
Echo Fox	12	16	8
Team SoloMid	16	14	16
OpTic Gaming	16	19	–
NRG Esports	14	19	–
compLexity Gaming	0	3	–
Immortals	16	16	–

Semifinals
Cloud9	16	16	–
Team SoloMid	6	9	–
OpTic Gaming	16	17	16
Immortals	10	19	14

Finals
Cloud9	14	16	6
OpTic Gaming	16	13	16

== Teams Competing ==
- SK Gaming
- Natus Vincere
- Team Liquid
- G2 Esports
- Virtus.pro
- Fnatic
- Astralis
- OpTic Gaming

== Group stage ==
Place	Team	Record	Differential	Round 1	Round 2	Round 3	Round 4	Round 5
1	Natus Vincere	3–0	+24	Team Liquid; 16–9; Mirage	Virtus.pro; 16–9; Train	SK Gaming; 16-6; Mirage	Playoffs	Playoffs
2	SK Gaming	3–1	+7	OpTic Gaming; 16–10; Train	Astralis; 16–13; Overpass	Natus Vincere; 6–16; Mirage	Virtus.pro; 16-8; Train	Playoffs
3–4	Virtus.pro	3–2	+15	Fnatic; 16–6; Cobblestone	Natus Vincere; 9–16; Train	Team Liquid; 16–8; Mirage	SK Gaming; 8–16; Train	OpTic Gaming; 16–14; Cobblestone
3–4	Team Liquid	3–2	0	Natus Vincere; 9–16; Mirage	G2 Esports; 16–7; Train	Virtus.pro; 8-16; Mirage	Fnatic; 16–14; Dust II	Fnatic; 16–12; Dust II
5–6	Fnatic	2-3	+4	Virtus.pro; 6–16; Cobblestone	OpTic Gaming; 16-3; Train	Astralis; 16–9; Dust II	Team Liquid; 14–16; Dust II	Team Liquid; 12–16; Dust II
5–6	OpTic Gaming	2-3	-8	SK Gaming; 10–16; Train	Fnatic; 3–16; Train	G2 Esports; 16–7; Cache	Astralis; 16–12; Overpass	Virtus.pro; 14–16; Train
7	Astralis	1-3	-11	G2 Esports; 16–13; Dust II	SK Gaming; 13–16; Overpass	Fnatic; 9-16; Dust II	OpTic Gaming; 12–16; Overpass	Eliminated
8	G2 Esports	0-3	-21	Astralis; 13–16; Dust II	Team Liquid; 7–16; Train	OpTic Gaming; 7–16; Cache	Eliminated	Eliminated

== Playoffs ==
Semifinals
Natus Vincere	2
Team Liquid	1
SK Gaming	1
Virtus.pro	2

Finals
Natus Vincere	2
Virtus.pro	1

=== Semifinals Scores ===
Semifinals
Team	Score	Map	Score	Team
Natus Vincere	7	Cobblestone	16	Team Liquid
Natus Vincere	16	Train	13	Team Liquid
Natus Vincere	16	Dust II	10	Team Liquid
SK Gaming	19	Mirage	16	Virtus.pro
SK Gaming	21	Overpass	25	Virtus.pro
SK Gaming	7	Nuke	16	Virtus.pro

=== Finals Scores ===
Finals
Team	Score	Map	Score	Team
Natus Vincere	3	Cobblestone	16	Virtus.pro
Natus Vincere	16	Train	8	Virtus.pro
Natus Vincere	19	Mirage	17	Virtus.pro

== Final standings ==
Final Standings
Place	Prize Money	Team	Roster	Coach
1st	US$125,000	Natus Vincere	s1mple, Edward, flamie, seized, GuardiaN	starix
2nd	US$50,000	Virtus.pro	TaZ, NEO, pashaBiceps, Snax, byali	kuben
3rd – 4th	US$25,000	SK Gaming	FalleN, coldzera, fnx, TACO, fer	dead
3rd – 4th	US$25,000	Team Liquid	Hiko, EliGE, jdm64, nitr0, Pimp	peacemaker
5th – 6th	US$8,500	Fnatic	twist, olofmeister, Lekr0, dennis, wenton	Jumpy
5th – 6th	US$8,500	OpTic Gaming	stanislaw, NAF, tarik, RUSH, mixwell	
7th	US$5,000	Astralis	karrigan, dev1ce, dupreeh, Xyp9x, Kjaerbye	zonic
8th	US$3,000	G2 Esports	shox, bodyy, Rpk, SmithZz, ScreaM	NiaK
