= S1mple =

Ukrainian esports player (born 1997)

s1mple
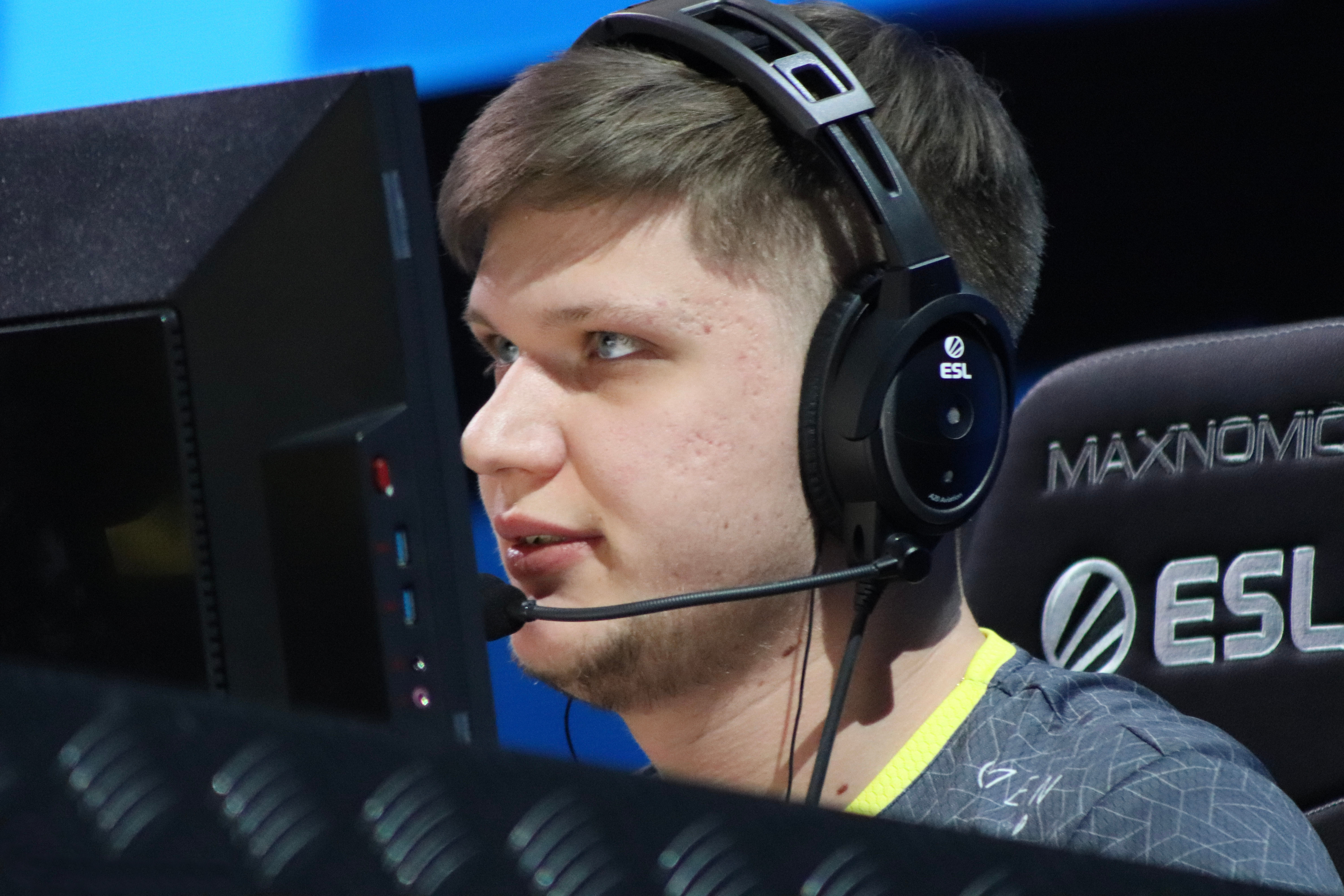
- s1mple at IEM Katowice Major 2019

Personal information
- Name: Олександр Олегович Костилєв (Oleksandr Olegovich Kostyliev)
- Born: 2 October 1997 (age 29); Kyiv, Ukraine
- Nationality: Ukrainian

Current team
- Team: BC.Game Esports
- Role: AWPer
- Games: Counter-Strike: Global Offensive; Counter-Strike 2

Career information
- Playing career: 2013–present
- Role: AWPer

Team history
- 2014–2015: Hellraisers
- 2015: Flipsid3 Tactics
- 2016: Team Liquid
- 2016–2025: Natus Vincere (Note: Inactive from October 2023 to July 2025.)
- 2024: Team Falcons (loan) (Note: s1mple has had two loan spells with Team Falcons, one in February 2024 and one in September for the remainder of 2024.)
- 2025: FaZe Clan (loan)
- 2025–present: BC.Game Esports

Career highlights and awards
- CS:GO Major champion (Stockholm 2021); HLTV Major MVP (Stockholm 2021); IEM Grand Slam champion (Season 3); 3× HLTV Player of the Year (2018, 2021, 2022); 8× HLTV Top 20 Player of the Year (2016–2023); 21× HLTV MVP

Oleksandr Olehovych Kostyliev (Note: Ukrainian: Олександр Олегович Костилєв Russian: Александр Олегович Костылев, romanized: Aleksandr Olegovich Kostylev) (born 2 October 1997), known by the pseudonym s1mple, is a Ukrainian professional Counter-Strike 2 player who currently plays for BC.Game Esports. He is widely considered one of the greatest players in Counter-Strike history, and the greatest in Counter-Strike: Global Offensive, having been ranked the No. 1 player in the world by HLTV in 2018, 2021 and 2022, and the No. 2 player in 2019 and 2020. He spent much of his career with Natus Vincere (Na’Vi), with whom he won several major international events, including his first Major title and MVP at PGL Major Stockholm 2021.

== Early life ==
Kostyliev was born on 2 October 1997. He started playing Counter-Strike at four years old at the recommendation of his older brother. S1mple picked up Counter-Strike: Global Offensive on its release in 2012, joining his first professional team a year later.

== Career ==
=== 2014 ===
S1mple's first team was a team called LAN DODGERS, but he was soon signed by Courage Gaming. Around September 2014, s1mple was signed by a large organisation known as Hellraisers. There, he joined ANGE1, Dosia, Kucher, and Markeloff, who s1mple considers his idol.

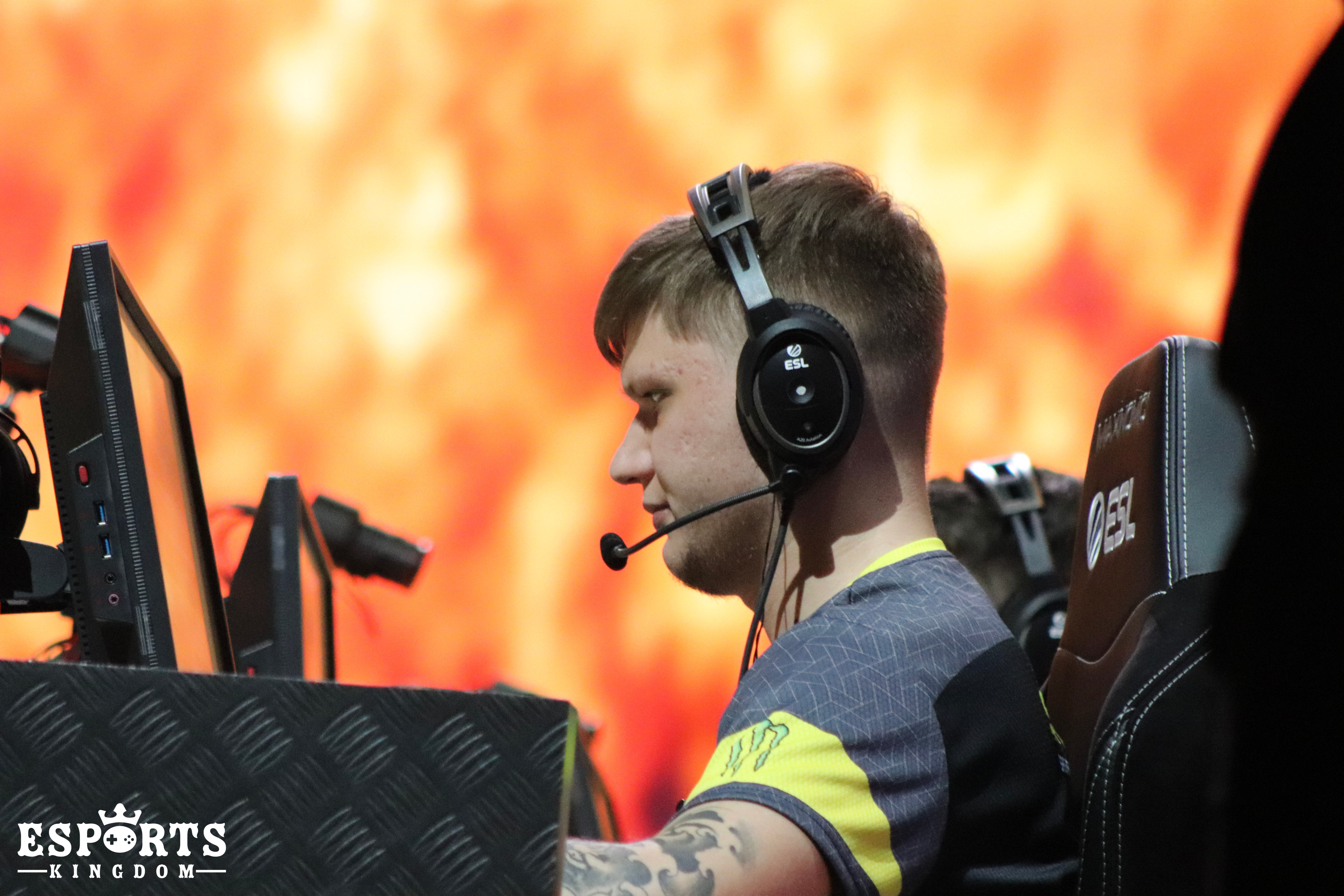
Oleksandr "s1mple" Kostyliev at the IEM Katowice 2019 tournament

=== 2015 ===
In January 2015, s1mple was soon removed from Hellraisers due to his inflammatory comments about Germans, and an ESL wire ban for cheating. S1mple himself says that the ban was from cheating in Counter-Strike 1.6. However, records from ESL show that it was an in-game ban from when S1mple played CS:GO. This ban was also extended to 2016 due to ban evasion. S1mple was soon after signed by Flipsid3 Tactics, but his time in the team would cut short due to the team's semi-final exit at ESWC 2015. At this period in his career, s1mple was known for being quite "toxic", or rude to his teammates.

=== 2016 ===
After a short stint studying Chinese at a university, s1mple moved to Los Angeles, United States in early 2016 and joined Team Liquid. A Team Liquid player, Spencer "Hiko" Martin, was standing in for Flipsid3 at ESWC 2015, and he developed a friendly relationship with s1mple there. Team Liquid surprised at the first major, and reached the semifinals of MLG Major Championship: Columbus, before falling to the eventual champions, Luminosity Gaming. The game against Luminosity is widely regarded as both one of the greatest matches and one of the greatest chokes of professional counter strike as Team Liquid failed to close out 15-9 lead in map 1 Mirage, and 15-6 lead in map 2 Cache, losing the series 0-2. The semifinal also featured one of the most famous clips in CS:GO history, a jumping no scope collateral AWP shot from Coldzera.

Despite this result at the game's biggest tournament, it wouldn't be long before s1mple would leave Team Liquid, citing homesickness. The next major of the year was approaching, and s1mple once again played for Team Liquid. During the semifinals at ESL One Cologne 2016, Valve Corporation added a graffiti on Cache commemorating s1mple's falling AWP play against fnatic. Thus, Team Liquid became the first North American team to reach a major final. They were stopped in the finals by the same Brazilian lineup of SK (formerly Luminosity Gaming). After leaving Team Liquid, he replaced Danylo "Zeus" Teslenko on Natus Vincere. With Na'Vi, s1mple won ESL One: New York 2016, and he was awarded the #4 placement in the HLTV top 20.

=== 2017 ===
During the first major of the year, ELEAGUE Major 2017, Na'Vi lost to Astralis during the quarterfinals. After a group stage exit at PGL 2017 Krakow Major Championship, Na'Vi benched Ladislav "GuardiaN" Kovacs and Denis "seized" Kostin while bringing in former member Danylo "Zeus" Teslenko. GuardiaN had been the AWPer for Na'Vi, so s1mple was forced to take up the sniper rifle after his departure. Despite these changes, Na'Vi continued their drought of results, and found a replacement for seized in the form Denis "electronic" Sharipov. s1mple didn't find much success in 2017, but he still kept up his individual form from the previous year. S1mple was awarded the #8 placement in the HLTV top 20 this year, down from #4 in 2016 due to a lack of results in the team.

=== 2018 ===
Na'Vi started 2018 with a semi-final finish at ELEAGUE Major: Boston 2018. At the start of 2018, Brazilian organisation MIBR attempted to sign s1mple and flamie. The deal was reportedly very close to being finished, but Na'Vi asked for too high of a buyout, and the deal eventually fell through. After two 2nd-place finishes at Starladder & i-League StarSeries Season 4 and Dreamhack Masters Marseille, Na'Vi won their first event of the year at StarSeries & i-League Season 5; they would follow it up with wins at CAC 2018, and ESL One Cologne 2018. S1mple won MVPs at StarSeries and Dreamhack Marseille, despite his team not winning the events. In the semifinals at Cologne, they beat the best team at the time, Astralis. Na'Vi would lose to Astralis at the second major of the year, FACEIT Major: London 2018. Na'Vi won their final event of the year, BLAST Pro Series: Copenhagen 2018, and s1mple would once again claim the MVP award. Due to s1mple's personal performance, he would be nominated for the #1 spot at the HLTV top 20 players of 2018. According to the statistics from HLTV, s1mple in 2018 achieved the highest individual rating out of all of previous top 20 players. In retrospect, 2018 s1mple is considered by many fans and pundits alike as the best player to ever touch CS:GO.

=== 2019 ===
Na'Vi came 3rd to 4th in the first major of the year. S1mple would keep up his form from 2018, and receive an MVP at StarSeries Season 7. At ESL One Cologne 2019, s1mple infamously tried to knife Team Liquid's nitr0 at match point in a 3v1 scenario, which resulted in nitr0 surviving and Team Liquid eventually winning the map, and the series 2-1.

After this, Na'Vi would eventually hit a slump and replace s1mple's long time teammate Ioann "Edward" Sukhariev with Kirill "Boombl4" Mikhailov who was in September 2019 made the team's leader (or IGL). At Starladder Berlin Major, Na'Vi was eliminated by the North American NRG squad in the quarterfinals.

=== 2021 ===
Na'Vi went into the PGL Major as the heavy favourites after placing first in their regional ranking tournament by reverse sweeping Gambit in the finals. After going undefeated in the Legends stage of the Stockholm Major, Na'Vi proceeded to the playoffs, defeating home favorites NiP in the process. Na'Vi retained their form and won the Major, making history by winning every single map played throughout the tournament. S1mple's individual performance through the Major, including a 2.26 HLTV rating in one of the two maps against Gambit in the semifinals, earned him tournament MVP. At the end of the year, s1mple was named Best Esports Player at The Game Awards.

=== 2023–present: Counter-Strike 2 ===
On 26 October 2023, s1mple announced that he would be stepping away from professional Counter-Strike competition temporarily. He would be replaced by w0nderful on 31 October. Upon the release of Counter-Strike 2, which replaced CS:GO shortly before he stepped away, s1mple was critical of the game, saying that it was a "shit game". The break would ultimately mean he would be on the bench for NaVi during PGL Copenhagen 2024, as they ended up winning their second Major.

s1mple would return to professional Counter-Strike competition on 19 February 2024, signing on a one-month loan with the Saudi-based Team Falcons, which saw him compete at the BLAST Premier Spring Showdown online event. This loan spell would only last 1 match, as Team Falcons lost to Metizport in the first round. On 27 September it was announced that s1mple would return to Team Falcons on loan once more, this time for the Perfect World Shanghai Major 2024 Europe RMR.

After last place group stage exits at ESL Challenger Katowice and Thunderpick World Championship, s1mple and Falcons placed second to last at the Perfect World Shanghai Major 2024 Europe RMR. Following these underwhelming results, Team Falcons announced they would not extend s1mple's loan period with the organization.

On 5 May 2025, FaZe Clan announced the loan signing of s1mple until the end of the BLAST.tv Austin Major, replacing broky. Faze Clan would reach the quarterfinals before losing to The MongolZ. S1mple would be benched and be replaced by broky on July 9th, following the Major.

On 28 July 2025, Natus Vincere announced that s1mple was released from the organization after having received offers from multiple teams. That same day, BC.Game Esports announced that they had signed s1mple.

== Notable achievements ==
Placement	Tournament	Location	Date
With Team Liquid
3rd place, bronze medalist(s)	MLG Major Championship: Columbus	Columbus, United States	29 March 2016 – 3 April 2016
2nd place, silver medalist(s)	ESL One Cologne 2016	Cologne, Germany	5 July 2016 – 10 July 2016
With Natus Vincere
1st place, gold medalist(s)	ESL One: New York 2016	New York, United States	30 September 2016 – 2 October 2016
3rd place, bronze medalist(s)	StarSeries Season 3	Kyiv, Ukraine	4 April 2017 – 9 April 2017
3rd place, bronze medalist(s)	ESL One Cologne 2017	Cologne, Germany	7 July 2017 – 9 July 2017
3rd place, bronze medalist(s)	ELEAGUE Major: Boston 2018	Boston, United States	12 January 2018 – 28 January 2018
2nd place, silver medalist(s)	DreamHack Masters Marseille 2018	Marseille, France	18 April 2018 – 22 April 2018
1st place, gold medalist(s)	StarSeries Season 5	Kyiv, Ukraine	28 May 2018 – 6 June 2018
1st place, gold medalist(s)	CAC 2018	Shanghai, China	14 June 2018 – 18 June 2018
1st place, gold medalist(s)	ESL One Cologne 2018	Cologne, Germany	3 July 2018 – 8 July 2018
3rd place, bronze medalist(s)	ELeague CS:GO Premier 2018	Atlanta, United States	21 July 2018 – 29 July 2018
2nd place, silver medalist(s)	FACEIT Major: London 2018	London, United Kingdom	5 September 2018 – 23 September 2018
2nd place, silver medalist(s)	EPICENTER 2018	Moscow, Russia	23 October 2018 – 28 October 2018
2nd place, silver medalist(s)	BLAST Pro Series: Lisbon 2018	Lisbon, Portugal	14 December 2018 – 15 December 2018
3rd place, bronze medalist(s)	IEM Katowice 2019	Katowice, Poland	13 February 2019 – 3 March 2019
1st place, gold medalist(s)	StarSeries Season 7	Shanghai, China	30 March 2019 – 7 April 2019
3rd place, bronze medalist(s)	ESL One Cologne 2019	Cologne, Germany	2 July 2019 – 7 July 2019
3rd place, bronze medalist(s)	DreamHack Masters Malmö 2019	Malmö, Sweden	1 October 2019 – 6 October 2019
3rd place, bronze medalist(s)	ESL Pro League Season 10: Finals	Odense, Denmark	3 December 2019 – 8 December 2019
2nd place, silver medalist(s)	ICE Challenge 2020	London, United Kingdom	1 February 2020 – 6 February 2020
1st place, gold medalist(s)	BLAST Premier: Spring 2020 Regular Season	London, United Kingdom	31 January 2020 – 16 February 2020
1st place, gold medalist(s)	IEM Katowice 2020	Katowice, Poland	24 February 2020 – 1 March 2020
2nd place, silver medalist(s)	ESL Pro League Season 12: Europe	Europe (Online)	1 September 2020 – 4 October 2020
2nd place, silver medalist(s)	IEM Beijing-Haidian 2020: Europe	Europe (Online)	6 November 2020 – 22 November 2020
3rd place, bronze medalist(s)	IEM Global Challenge 2020	Europe (Online)	15 December 2020 – 20 December 2020
1st place, gold medalist(s)	BLAST Premier: Global Final 2020	Europe (Online)	19 January 2021 – 24 January 2021
1st place, gold medalist(s)	BLAST Premier: Spring Groups 2021	Europe (Online)	4 February 2021 – 14 February 2021
1st place, gold medalist(s)	DreamHack Masters Spring 2021	Europe (Online)	29 April 2021 – 9 May 2021
2nd place, silver medalist(s)	Blast Premier: Spring Finals 2021	Europe (Online)	15 June 2021 – 20 June 2021
1st place, gold medalist(s)	IEM Cologne 2021	Cologne, Germany	6 July 2021 – 18 July 2021
1st place, gold medalist(s)	ESL Pro League Season 14	Europe (Online)	16 August – 12 September 2021
1st place, gold medalist(s)	PGL Major Stockholm 2021	Stockholm, Sweden	26 October 2021 – 7 November 2021
1st place, gold medalist(s)	Blast Premier: Fall Finals 2021	Copenhagen, Denmark	24 November 2021 – 28 November 2021
1st place, gold medalist(s)	Blast Premier: World Final 2021	Copenhagen, Denmark	14 December 2021 – 19 December 2021
2nd place, silver medalist(s)	PGL Major Antwerp 2022	Antwerp, Belgium	9 May 2021 – 22 May 2021
1st place, gold medalist(s)	BLAST Premier: Spring Finals 2022	Lisbon, Portugal	15 June 2021 – 19 June 2021
2nd place, silver medalist(s)	IEM Cologne 2022	Cologne, Germany	7 July 2022 – 17 July 2022
3rd place, bronze medalist(s)	IEM Katowice 2023	Katowice, Poland	4 February 2023 – 12 February 2023

== Individual awards and accolades ==
Rankings

- HLTV Top 20 Players: 4th (2016), 8th (2017), 1st (2018), 2nd (2019), 2nd (2020), 1st (2021), 1st (2022), 7th (2023)

MVP

- ESL One New York 2016
- DreamHack Winter 2017
- StarSeries Season 4, 2018
- StarSeries Season 5, 2018
- ESL One Cologne 2018
- Dreamhack Masters Marseille 2018
- CS:GO Asia Championships 2018
- BLAST Pro Series Copenhagen 2018
- StarSeries Season 7, 2019
- IEM Katowice 2020
- ESL Pro League Season 12: Europe 2020
- BLAST Premier: Global Final 2020
- DreamHack Masters Spring 2021
- Starladder CIS RMR 2021
- IEM Cologne 2021
- ESL Pro League Season 14 2021
- PGL Major Stockholm 2021
- Blast Premier: World Final 2021
- BLAST Premier: Spring Finals 2022
- IEM Cologne 2022

EVP

- FACEIT Major: London 2018
- MLG Major Championship: Columbus, 2016
- ESL One Cologne 2016
- IEM Katowice 2019

Other awards

- Esports Awards, PC Player of the Year, 2018
- Esports, PC Player of the Year, 2021
- The Game Awards, Best Esports Player, 2021
- Player of the Year (HLTV Award), 2022
- AWPer of the Year (Panel Award), 2022
- Player of the Year (HLTV Award), 2021
- Intel Grand Slam Season 3 Winner
