= Maikelele =

Swedish professional gamer (born 1991)

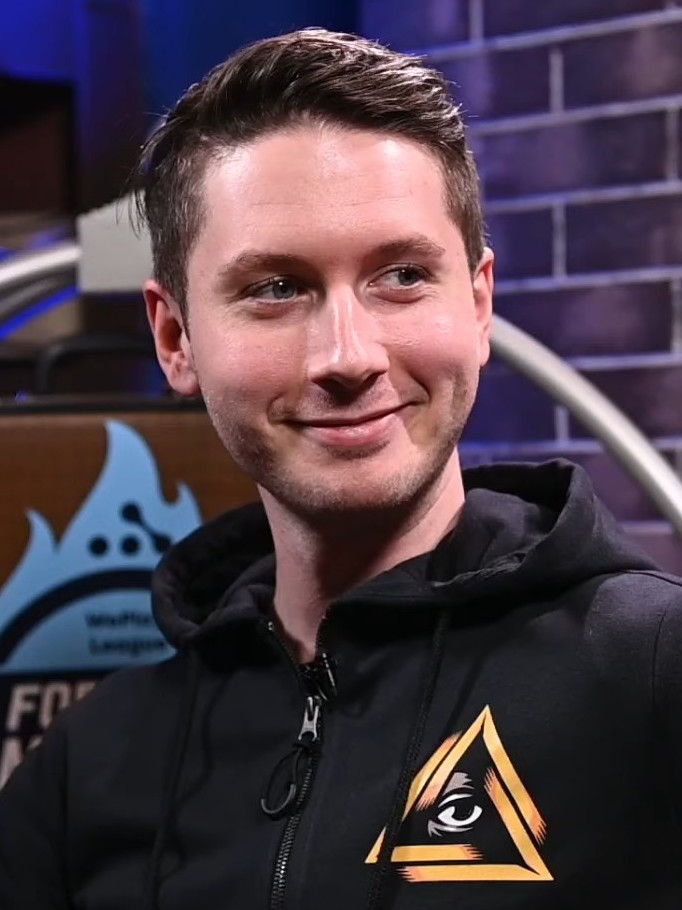
- Maikelele in 2019

Personal information
- Name: Mikail Bill
- Born: 3 May 1991 (age 35)
- Nationality: Swedish

Career information
- Games: Counter-Strike; Counter-Strike: Global Offensive
- Playing career: 2010–present
- Role(s): Rifler and AWPer

Team history
- 2010: Begrip Gaming
- 2010: icsu
- 2010: wCrea
- 2010: icsu
- 2011: FroZeN HeLLGuardZ
- 2011: decerto
- 2011: 3DMAX
- 2012: Cheese Steaks
- 2012: CAI
- 2012: Volt Gaming
- 2013: Team Refuse
- 2013–2014: LGB eSports
- 2014: Team Property
- 2014: SK Gaming
- 2014: ESG!
- 2014: UnWanted
- 2014: mousesports
- 2014–2015: Ninjas in Pyjamas
- 2015: LGB eSports
- 2015: Team Kinguin
- 2015–2016: G2 Esports
- 2016: FaZe Clan
- 2016: mixbanan
- 2016: Ninjas in Pyjamas
- 2016–2017: qwerty
- 2017: Team Dignitas
- 2017: Red Reserve
- 2018: Enyoy
- 2018: Digital Chaos
- 2018–2019: NoChance
- 2019: SMASH Esports
- 2019–2020: GODSENT

Mikail Bill (born 3 May 1991), better known as Maikelele, is a Swedish retired professional Counter-Strike: Global Offensive player. He has played in teams like qwerty, G2 Esports, Team Kinguin, LGB eSports, Ninjas in Pyjamas, mousesports, UnWanted, ESG!, FaZe Clan, SK Gaming, Team Property, Red Reserve, Digital Chaos and GODSENT.

== Career ==
Maikelele, then known as "Eksem", started playing Counter-Strike professionally in 2010 for Begrip Gaming.

=== 2013/2014 ===
He would first gain prominence in Counter-Strike: Global Offensive when he joined LGB eSports in August 2013. LGB eSports qualified for the first CS:GO Major, DreamHack Winter 2013, through the online qualifiers. The team ended up placing 5-8th. LGB eSports parted ways with Eksem on 2 February 2014.

On 27 March 2014, Eksem joined SK Gaming. SK Gaming went on to qualify for DreamHack Summer 2014 where they placed 5–8th, losing to HellRaisers in the quarterfinals. SK Gaming dropped the roster on 6 May. Eksem and the rest of ex-SK Gaming went on to form the team "ESG!". It was on ESG! where Eksem changed his alias to Maikelele. The team was picked up by Heat eSports for Gfinity G3 and ultimately disbanded on 12 August 2014. Maikelele briefly joined UnWanted on 22 August 2014 alongside fellow ESG! member Alexander "SKYTTEN" Carlsson. Maikelele left the team on 16 September 2014, citing attitude issues. Maikelele acted as a stand-in for Mousesports during the ESWC 2014 qualifiers and ended up qualifying for the main event.

On 4 November 2014 he replaced Robin "Fifflaren" Johansson on Ninjas in Pyjamas. They finished 2nd at DreamHack Winter 2014.

=== 2015/2016 ===
NiP then finished second at MLG X Games Aspen Invitational. The team announced they were holding tryouts to replace Maikelele in February 2015 and he officially left the team on 18 March. Maikelele briefly joined LGB eSports' Norwegian lineup on 18 March 2015.

Team Kinguin picked up an international Counter-Strike: Global Offensive team on 5 May which consisted of Maikelele, rain, fox, ScreaM, and SKYTTEN.

In August 2015 Team Kinguin dropped their Counter-Strike: Global Offensive team because of corporate restructuring and the team was picked up by Gamers2, now known as G2 Esports. The team made it to the semi-finals of DreamHack Open Cluj-Napoca 2015.

On 20 January 2016 it was announced that FaZe Clan had picked up G2's Counter-Strike team for an unknown amount of money. In April, FaZe placed 9-12th at MLG Major Championship: Columbus. On 3 April 2016 Maikelele announced on Twitter that he was leaving FaZe Clan.

On 24 July, after over three months of being without a team, Maikelele announced that he is planning to create a new CS:GO team and also return to the AWPer position.

Maikelele returned as a stand-in for Ninjas in Pyjamas for SL i-League StarSeries Season 2. Ninjas in Pyjamas won the tournament on 11 September 2016 after beating G2 Esports in the finals.

=== 2017-present ===
In 2017 Maikelele formed a short lived team known as qwerty with Swedish teammates atter, wenton, slap and the Bosnian player and former Ninjas in Pyjamas coach pita.

In March, Maikelele was signed by Dignitas in a European mix team. After only 1 month, Maikelele was removed and he joined Red Reserve and made grand final at DreamHack Open Valencia where Swedish squad ended second after being defeated by Ninjas in Pyjamas.

On 1 September 2017, Red Reserve organization and the players parted ways after internal problems within the team. Maikelele left the team and took a step back from competitive gaming. In January 2018, Maikelele returned to competitive gaming with Team Enyoy, teaming up with Markus "pronax" Wallsten, Jacob "pyth" Mourujärvi, Mattias "benny" Rosback, and Aleksandar "jayzaR" Zarkovic.

On 7 May 2018, Team Enyoy signed long-term contracts with Digital Chaos whom decided to venture into Counter-Strike: Global Offensive. On October 19, 2018, Maikelele and pronax left Digital Chaos because of unsuccessful online tournaments and because they wished to build an international team, something the organisation did not agree with.

On 21 October 2018, Maikelele joined LeftOut for play the Europe Minor Open Qualifier for IEM Katowice 2019. LeftOut would eventually become NoChance, and they came 5th-6th in the European Minor for the StarLadder Major: Berlin 2019. In September 2019, NoChance were signed by a new e-sports organisation, SMASH.

On 13 November 2019, Maikelele's team was released by SMASH e-sports. The day after, they were signed by GODSENT, and they won WePlay! Forge of Masters Season 2 only 3 days after. Following that win, he came back to HLTV's top 30 after being absent from it for a long time. He and his team made to the top 20 of the same ranking on 10 February 2019.
