= ELEAGUE Season 2 =

Esports league season

ELEAGUE
- 2016

Tournament information
- Sport: Counter-Strike: Global Offensive
- Location: Atlanta, Georgia, United States
- Dates: October 21, 2016–December 3, 2016
- Administrator: Turner Sports; William Morris Endeavor
- Tournament format(s): Group Stage (Bo1/Bo3); Single-Elimination Brackets (Bo3)
- Venue: Turner Studios
- Teams: 16 teams
- Purse: $1,100,000 USD

Final positions
- Champions: OpTic Gaming
- 1st runners-up: Astralis
- 2nd runners-up: SK Gaming; FaZe Clan
- MVP: Will "RUSH" Wierzba

ELEAGUE Season 2 was the second season of the ELEAGUE Counter-Strike: Global Offensive league that ran from October 21, 2016, to December 3, 2016, and was broadcast on cable television on TBS. The season featured 120 teams overall and 16 teams in the main tournament from across the world competing in a seven-week season, which included a regular season and a playoffs. The broadcast was simultaneously available on the online streaming service Twitch.

The season began with Season 1 semifinalist mousesports defeating Brazil's second best team Immortals and ended in the grand finals with OpTic Gaming pulling off an upset against Astralis to take home Season 2's ELEAGUE title.

In Romania This Tournament Is Brocasted On Pro Arena

== Format ==
Season 2 will reflect a format much like a CS:GO major, such at the recent ESL One Cologne 2016.

The top eight finishers from last season's ELEAGUE will automatically be invited to compete in the second season. The other sixteen teams are invited to play in the Closed Qualifiers in their respective continents. Each continent will feature three open qualifiers that have sixteen teams each.

Each continent will have three open qualifiers, and each open qualifier will have sixteen teams playing in a single elimination, best of one bracket. Four teams from the first and second European open qualifiers, three from the third European qualifier, two from the first and second North American qualifiers, and one from the third North American qualifier will move on to play in their respective closed qualifiers.

Eleven teams from the European open qualifiers and five teams from the North American open qualifiers will compete in their respective closed qualifiers. Four teams from each closed qualifier will progress to ELEAGUE Season 2, making a total of sixteen teams. In both closed qualifiers, teams will play in a single elimination, best of three bracket until a four teams remain.

The group stage will feature four groups, making four teams per group. Teams will play in a double elimination group stage. The highest seed in the group will play against the lowest seed and the other two teams will play against each other. The two winners and two losers will then play against each other. The winner of the winners match will move on to the Playoffs and the loser of the winners match will play a third match against the winner of the losers match. The loser of the losers match is eliminated from the tournament. The last two teams in the group will play; the winner of the match will get a spot in the Playoffs and the loser will head home. The top two teams in each group will advance to the Playoffs.

The Playoffs will consist of the eight teams. Teams will play in a single elimination, best of three bracket and will keep playing until a winner is decided.

== Qualifiers ==
=== European Closed Qualifier ===
Europe

- Team Dignitas (Season 1)
- FaZe Clan (Season 1)
- Gambit Gaming (Season 1)
- Flipsid3 Tactics (Season 1)
- G2 Esports (Season 1)
- ALTERNATE aTTaX (Open Qualifier 1)
- Team Kinguin (Open Qualifier 1)
- HellRaisers (Open Qualifier 1)
- GODSENT (Open Qualifier 1)
- XPRESIV'E Club (Open Qualifier 2)
- ENCORE (Open Qualifier 2)
- Deadweight (Open Qualifier 2)
- passion (Open Qualifier 2)
- Tengri (Open Qualifier 3)
- tRICKED eSport (Open Qualifier 3)
- walkover (Open Qualifier 3)

EU Qualifier

Round of 16
G2 Esports	2
walkover	0
Team Kinguin	2
tRICKED eSport	1
Team Dignitas	2
Tengri	1
Gambit Gaming	2
passions	0
FaZe Clan	2
XPRESIV'E Club	1
HellRaisers	2
ENCORE	1
GODSENT	2
Deadweight	0
Flipsid3 Tactics	0
ALTERNATE aTTaX	2

Round of 8
G2 Esports	2
Team Kinguin	0
Team Dignitas	2
Gambit Gaming	0
FaZe Clan	2
HellRaisers	0
GODSENT	1
ALTERNATE aTTaX	2

Qualified
G2 Esports	Q
Team Dignitas	Q
FaZe Clan	Q
ALTERNATE aTTaX	Q

–
ELEAGUE Season 2	→
ELEAGUE Season 2	→

=== North American Closed Qualifier ===
North America

- SK Gaming^{1} (Season 1)
- compLexity Gaming (Season 1)
- Echo Fox (Season 1)
- Counter Logic Gaming (Season 1)
- NRG Esports (Season 1)
- Luminosity Gaming^{1} (Season 1)
- Team Liquid (Season 1)
- OpTic Gaming
- Renegades (Season 1)
- Selfless Gaming (Season 1)
- Team SoloMid (Season 1)
- Immortals (Open Qualifier 1)
- Splyce (Open Qualifier 2)
- Muffin Lightning (Open Qualifier 2)
- eUnited (Open Qualifier 3)

^{1} SK Gaming released its Danish roster and picked up the roster of Luminosity Gaming. Luminosity then picked up the roster of Winout.net, another Brazilian team, after its former roster leaves for SK. The former Danish squad, now under the organization Heroic, was not invited to any qualifier.

NA Qualifier

Round of 16
SK Gaming	2
Muffin Lightning	0
Counter Logic Gaming	0
NRG Esports	2
OpTic Gaming	2
compLexity Gaming	0
Renegades	2
Luminosity Gaming	0
Immortals	2
Blight Gaming	0
Team SoloMid	2
Selfless Gaming	1
Team Liquid	2
eUnited	0
Echo Fox	2
Splyce	0

Round of 8
SK Gaming	2
NRG Esports	0
OpTic Gaming	2
Renegades	0
Immortals	2
Team SoloMid	0
Team Liquid	1
Echo Fox	2

Qualified
SK Gaming	Q
OpTic Gaming	Q
Immortals	Q
Echo Fox	Q

–
ELEAGUE Season 2	→
ELEAGUE Season 2	→

== Teams Competing ==
The top eight teams from ELEAGUE Season 1 will be joined by eight other teams, four from each closed qualifier.

- Astralis (Season 1 Top 8)
- Natus Vincere (Season 1 Top 8)
- Ninjas in Pyjamas (Season 1 Top 8)
- Virtus.pro (Season 1 Top 8)
- Fnatic (Season 1 Top 8)
- Cloud9 (Season 1 Top 8)
- Team EnVyUs (Season 1 Top 8)
- mousesports (Season 1 Top 8)
- G2 Esports (EU Closed Qualifier)
- Team Dignitas (EU Closed Qualifier)
- FaZe Clan (EU Closed Qualifier)
- ALTERNATE aTTaX (EU Closed Qualifier)
- SK Gaming (NA Closed Qualifier)
- OpTic Gaming (NA Closed Qualifier)
- Immortals (NA Closed Qualifier)
- Echo Fox (NA Closed Qualifier)

== Broadcast Talent ==
Analysts

- Richard Lewis
- Duncan "Thorin" Shields
- Jason "moses" O'Toole
- Scott "SirScoots" Smith

Commentators

- Anders Blume
- Auguste "Semmler" Massonnat
- Daniel "ddk" Kapadia
- James Bardolph

Interviewers

- Kate Yeager
- Rachel "Seltzer" Quirico

Observers

- Heather "sapphiRe" Garozzo
- DJ "Prius" Kuntz
- Kevin "kVIN_S" Swift
- Benjamin "CoffeeMcSwagger" Budka

== Group stage ==
=== Group A ===
Seed	Team	Record	RF-RA	RD	Points
1	mousesports	2–0	35–25	+10	2
2	FaZe Clan	2–1	111–98	+13	2
3	Cloud9	1–2	80–81	−1	1
4	Immortals	0–2	43–65	−22	0

Group A Results
mousesports	1	0	Immortals
Cloud9	1	0	FaZe Clan
mousesports	1	0	Cloud9
FaZe Clan	2	1	Immortals
Cloud9	1	2	FaZe Clan

Group A Scores

Group A Scores
Team	Score	Map	Score	Team
mousesports	16	Mirage	9	Immortals
Cloud9	16	Train	7	FaZe Clan
mousesports	19	Dust II^{†}	16	Cloud9
FaZe Clan	16	Mirage	2	Immortals
FaZe Clan	17	Train	19	Immortals
FaZe Clan	16	Overpass	13	Immortals
Cloud9	20	Mirage	22	FaZe Clan
Cloud9	19	Train	17	FaZe Clan
Cloud9	9	Overpass	16	FaZe Clan

=== Group B ===
Seed	Team	Record	RF-RA	RD	Points
1	Virtus.pro	2–0	32–8	+24	2
2	Ninjas in Pyjamas	2–1	55–39	+16	2
3	G2 Esports	1–2	55–53	+2	1
4	Echo Fox	0–2	6–48	−43	0

Group B Results
Virtus.pro	1	0	Echo Fox
Ninjas in Pyjamas	1	0	G2 Esports
Virtus.pro	1	0	Ninjas in Pyjamas
G2 Esports	2	0	Echo Fox
Ninjas in Pyjamas	2	0	G2 Esports

Group B Scores

Group B Scores
Team	Score	Map	Score	Team
Virtus.pro	16	Nuke	1	Echo Fox
Ninjas in Pyjamas	16	Overpass	5	G2 Esports
Virtus.pro	16	Cobblestone^{†}	7	Ninjas in Pyjamas
G2 Esports	16	Nuke	3	Echo Fox
G2 Esports	16	Dust 2	2	Echo Fox
G2 Esports	–	Cache	–	Echo Fox
Ninjas in Pyjamas	16	Nuke	8	G2 Esports
Ninjas in Pyjamas	16	Train	10	G2 Esports
Ninjas in Pyjamas	–	Cobblestone	–	G2 Esports

=== Group C ===
Seed	Team	Record	RF-RA	RD	Points
1	Astralis	2–0	32–19	+13	2
2	SK Gaming	2–1	61–42	+19	2
3	Natus Vincere	1–2	50–59	−9	1
4	ALTERNATE aTTaX	0–2	17–48	−31	0

Group C Results
Natus Vincere	0	1	SK Gaming
Astralis	1	0	ALTERNATE aTTaX
Astralis	1	0	SK Gaming
Natus Vincere	2	0	ALTERNATE aTTaX
SK Gaming	2	0	Natus Vincere

Group C Scores

Group C Scores
Team	Score	Map	Score	Team
Natus Vincere	10	Train	16	SK Gaming
Astralis	16	Nuke	6	ALTERNATE aTTaX
Astralis	16	Overpass^{†}	13	SK Gaming
Natus Vincere	16	Cobblestone	3	ALTERNATE aTTaX
Natus Vincere	16	Overpass	8	ALTERNATE aTTaX
Natus Vincere	–	Nuke	–	ALTERNATE aTTaX
SK Gaming	16	Dust II	8	Natus Vincere
SK Gaming	16	Train	8	Natus Vincere
SK Gaming	–	Nuke	–	Natus Vincere

=== Group D ===
Seed	Team	Record	RF-RA	RD	Points
1	Team Dignitas	2–0	32–15	+17	2
2	OpTic Gaming	2–1	94–62	+32	2
3	Fnatic	1–2	38–65	−27	1
4	Team EnVyUs	0–2	39–61	−22	0

Group D Results
Fnatic	1	0	OpTic Gaming
Team EnVyUs	0	1	Team Dignitas
Fnatic	0	1	Team Dignitas
Team EnVyUS	1	2	OpTic Gaming
Fnatic	0	2	OpTic Gaming

Group D Scores

Group D Scores
Team	Score	Map	Score	Team
Fnatic	19	Cache	17	OpTic Gaming
Team EnVyUS	12	Cobblestone	16	Team Dignitas
Fnatic	3	Overpass^{†}	16	Team Dignitas
Team EnVyUS	3	Overpass	16	OpTic Gaming
Team EnVyUS	16	Dust II	13	OpTic Gaming
Team EnVyUS	8	Cobblestone	16	OpTic Gaming
Fnatic	5	Cobblestone	16	OpTic Gaming
Fnatic	11	Dust II	16	OpTic Gaming
Fnatic	–	Train	–	OpTic Gaming

^{†} Game was broadcast on TBS.

== Playoffs ==
Quarterfinals
Team Dignitas	1
SK Gaming	2
Astralis	2
Ninjas in Pyjamas	1
mousesports	0
OpTic Gaming	2
Virtus.pro	1
FaZe Clan	2

Semifinals
SK Gaming	0
Astralis	2
OpTic Gaming	2
FaZe Clan	0

Finals
Astralis	1
OpTic Gaming	2

Quarterfinals
Team	Score	Map	Score	Team
Team Dignitas	6	Dust II	16	SK Gaming
Team Dignitas	16	Mirage	4	SK Gaming
Team Dignitas	14	Overpass	16	SK Gaming
Astralis	13	Cobblestone	16	Ninjas in Pyjamas
Astralis	16	Train	2	Ninjas in Pyjamas
Astralis	16	Overpass	10	Ninjas in Pyjamas
mousesports	7	Train	16	OpTic Gaming
mousesports	11	Cache	16	OpTic Gaming
mousesports	–	Dust II	–	OpTic Gaming
Virtus.pro	16	Nuke^{†}	4	FaZe Clan
Virtus.pro	10	Overpass^{†}	16	FaZe Clan
Virtus.pro	14	Cache^{†}	16	FaZe Clan

Semifinals
Team	Score	Map	Score	Team
SK Gaming	11	Overpass	16	Astralis
SK Gaming	12	Train	16	Astralis
SK Gaming	–	Dust II	–	Astralis
OpTic Gaming	16	Train^{†}	3	FaZe Clan
OpTic Gaming	16	Overpass^{†}	12	FaZe Clan
OpTic Gaming	–	Dust II	–	FaZe Clan

Finals
Team	Score	Map	Score	Team
Astralis	16	Train^{†}	9	OpTic Gaming
Astralis	6	Cobblestone^{†}	16	OpTic Gaming
Astralis	11	Overpass^{†}	16	OpTic Gaming

== Final standings ==
Final Standings
Place	Prize Money	Team	Roster
1st	US$400,000	OpTic Gaming	NAF, stanislaw, RUSH, tarik, mixwell
2nd	US$140,000	Astralis	dev1ce, Xyp9x, dupreeh, Kjaerbye, gla1ve
3rd – 4th	US$60,000	SK Gaming	FalleN, coldzera, fnx, TACO, fer
3rd – 4th	US$60,000	FaZe Clan	karrigan, aizy, rain, kioShiMa, allu
5th – 8th	US$50,000	Team Dignitas	k0nfig, cajunb, Magiskb0y, MSL, RUBINO
5th – 8th	US$50,000	Ninjas in Pyjamas	f0rest, GeT RiGhT, Xizt, pyth, friberg
5th – 8th	US$50,000	mousesports	denis, Spiidi, NiKo, ChrisJ, loWel
5th – 8th	US$50,000	Virtus.pro	NEO, TaZ, Snax, pashaBiceps, byali
9th – 12th	US$30,000	Cloud9	n0thing, Stewie2K, Skadoodle, autimatic, shroud
9th – 12th	US$30,000	G2 Esports	shox, SmithZz, Rpk, bodyy, ScreaM
9th – 12th	US$30,000	Natus Vincere	s1mple, seized, Edward, flamie, GuardiaN
9th – 12th	US$30,000	Fnatic	olofmeister, KRiMZ, twist, disco doplan, Jumpy
13th – 16th	US$30,000	Immortals	HEN1, LUCAS1, zews, felps, boltz
13th – 16th	US$30,000	Echo Fox	sgares, ShahZaM, roca, fREAKAZOiD, ryx
13th – 16th	US$30,000	ALTERNATE aTTaX	kzy, crisby, keev, tiziaN, syrsoN
13th – 16th	US$30,000	Team EnVyUs	kennyS, Happy, SIXER, apEX, NBK-
