= ESL One Cologne 2018 =

- 2018

Tournament information
- Sport: Counter-Strike: Global Offensive
- Location: Cologne, Germany
- Dates: July 3, 2018–July 8, 2018
- Administrator: Electronic Sports League (ESL)
- Tournament format(s): 16 team swiss group stage Six team single-elimination playoff
- Venue: Lanxess Arena
- Teams: 16 teams
- Purse: US$300,000

Final positions
- Champions: Natus Vincere
- 1st runners-up: BIG
- 2nd runners-up: Astralis; FaZe Clan

Tournament statistics
- Attendance: 15,000
- MVP: Oleksandr "s1mple" Kostyliev

ESL One Cologne 2018 was a Counter-Strike: Global Offensive tournament run by ESL. In July 2018, sixteen teams from around the globe competed in an offline (LAN) tournament that featured a group stage and playoffs with a US$125,000 prize pool. It would be the second consecutive year since Cologne 2016 in which Valve decided to pass up on the historic tournament series as a Major host in favor of the FACEIT Major: London 2018.

This tournament was also the eleventh tournament of the first season of the Intel Grand Slam, which a list of international premier tournaments run by ESL and DreamHack. Each team gets ten tournaments that it participates in to have a chance at winning four of them. The first team to win four titles earns an extra $1,000,000. FaZe Clan (ESL One New York 2017, Intel Extreme Masters Season XIII - Sydney, and ESL One Belo Horizonte 2018) leads the way with three wins. SK Gaming (ESL One Cologne 2017 and ESL Pro League Season 6) and Astralis (DreamHack Masters Marseille 2018 and ESL Pro League Season 7) are tied for second; however, SK Gaming's players contracts expired with the team and the players opted to sign with the Immortals-owned mibr brand. G2 Esports (DreamHack Masters Malmö 2017), Ninjas in Pyjamas (Intel Extreme Masters Season XII – Oakland), and Fnatic (Intel Extreme Masters Season XII – World Championship) have one title each. ESL One Belo Horizonte 2018 precedes the Cologne 2018 event.

The finals featured Natus Vincere – which defeated Fnatic and the favorites to win the tournament Astralis – and the dark horse and hometown favorites BIG – which defeated G2 Esports and upset FaZe Clan. Natus Vincere would end up winning the tournament over BIG 3-1 for its first Intel Grand Slam win.

== Format ==
ESL invited eleven teams to compete in the tournament. Two teams from Europe, one team from North America, one team from Asia, and the winner of the GG.BET Majestic tournament competed for the last five spots. The format of the group stage was two groups of eight teams in a double elimination bracket. The initial matches were a best of one and then every other match was a best of three. The teams to win their brackets moved on to the semifinals while the next two teams were in the quarterfinals. The playoffs was a six team, single elimination best of three bracket, but the grand finals was a best of five.

=== Map pool ===
The event used Valve's Active Duty map pool. On April 20, 2018, Valve announced that revamped Dust II would be replacing Cobblestone in the Active Duty map pool.

Maps

- Cache
- Dust II
- Inferno
- Mirage
- Nuke
- Overpass
- Train

== Broadcast Talent ==
Desk host

- Alex "Machine" Richardson

Stage host

- Oliver James "OJ Borg" Borg

Interviewer

- Tres "stunna" Saranthus

Analysts

- Chad "SPUNJ" Burchill
- Janko "YNk" Paunović
- Duncan "Thorin" Shields

Commentators

- Henry "HenryG" Greer
- Jason "moses" O'Toole
- Lauren "Pansy" Scott
- Matthew "Sadokist" Trivett

Observers

- Heather "sapphiRe" Garozzo
- DJ "Prius" Kuntz

== Qualifiers ==
=== European qualifier ===
Two teams from the European qualifier moved on to the main event in Germany. North tore through the bracket after suffering an initial scare against the unknown WASD Sports while Gambit qualified through the loser's bracket after HellRaisers forfeited the series.

Upper round 1 | Upper round 2 | Upper final | Qualified
Gambit Esports | 2
Valiance | 0
Gambit Esports | 0
HellRaisers | 2
Space Soldiers | 1
HellRaisers | 2
HellRaisers | 0
North | 2
Heroic | 1
Virtus.pro | 0
Virtus.pro | 1
North | 2
North | 2
WASD Sports | 0 | North
Gambit Esports
Lower round 1 | Lower round 2 | Lower round 3 | Lower final
Virtus.pro | 0
Valiance | 1 | Space Soldiers | 2 | HellRaisers | FF
Space Soldiers | 2 | Space Soldiers | 1 | Gambit Esports | W
Gambit Esports | 2
Gambit Esports | 2
Heroic | 0 | Heroic | 2
WASD Sports | 1

=== North American qualifier ===
One team from the North American qualifier was given a ticket to Cologne. Renegades dominated competition as the Australian team defeated OpTic Gaming in the finals.

Upper round 1
Luminosity Gaming | 2
eUnited | 0
NRG Esports | FF
compLexity Gaming | W
Lower round 1
compLexity G. | FF
eUnited | W
Luminosity Gaming | W
NRG Esports | FF

Upper round 2
Renegades | 2
Luminosity Gaming | 0
OpTic Gaming | W
compLexity Gaming | FF
Lower round 2
eUnited | 2
Luminosity Gaming | 0

Upper final
Renegades | 2
OpTic Gaming | 0
Lower final
OpTic Gaming | 2
eUnited | 0

Final
Renegades | 3
OpTic Gaming | 1

=== Asian qualifier ===
The Chinese powerhouse TyLoo looked to cruise its way to the main stage, but B.O.O.T-dream[S]cape pulled off a massive upset against MVP PK, the second seed in the qualifier, and then defeated the first seed TyLoo to qualify for the event.

Upper round 1 | Upper round 2 | Upper final | Final
TyLoo | 2
ArkAngel Pro Team | 0
TyLoo | 2
B.O.O.T-d[S] | 1
B.O.O.T-d[S] | W
Eclipse | FF
TyLoo | 2
VG.FlashGaming | 1
The MongolZ | 1
VG.Flash Gaming | 2
VG.FlashGaming | 2
Recca Esports | 0
MVP PK | 0
Recca Esports | 2 | TyLoo | 2
B.O.O.T-d[S] | 3
Lower round 1 | Lower round 2 | Lower round 3 | Lower final
Recca Esports | 2
ArkAngel Pro Team | W | ArkAngel Pro Team | 0 | VG.FlashGaming | 0
Eclipse | FF | Recca Esports | 0 | B.O.O.T-d[S] | 2
B.O.O.T-d[S] | 2
B.O.O.T-d[S] | 2
The MongolZ | MVP PK | 1
MVP PK | 2

=== GG.BET Majestic ===
GG.BET Majestic would determine the final team in Cologne 2018. Gambit Esports and North were invited, but since the two teams had qualified for Cologne, two other teams would take their places. Team EnVyUs and AGO Gaming were two runner-ups for the European side, but both teams could not attend, so ENCE eSports would take North's spot. AVANGAR took Gambit's spot.

Upper round 1
ALTERNATE aTTaX | 1
AVANGAR | 0
Team Spirit | 1
ENCE eSports | 0
Lower round 1
AVANGAR | 1
ENCE eSports | 2

Upper final
ALTERNATE aTTaX | 0
Team Spirit | 2
Lower final
ALTERNATE aTTaX | 0
ENCE eSports | 2

Final
Team Spirit | 0
ENCE eSports | 2

== Participating teams ==
Eleven teams were invited and five teams qualified through their respective qualifiers. Teams were seeded based on ESL's ranking system.

=== Direct Invitees ===
- Astralis
- BIG
- Cloud9
- FaZe Clan
- Fnatic
- G2 Esports
- mibr
- mousesports
- Natus Vincere
- Ninjas in Pyjamas
- Team Liquid

=== Qualifier winners ===
- North (Europe)
- Gambit Esports (Europe)
- Renegades (North America)
- B.O.O.T-dream[S]cape (Asia)
- ENCE eSports (GG.BET Majestic)

== Group stage ==
The format of the group stage was two groups of eight teams in a double elimination bracket. The teams to win their brackets moved on to the semifinals while the next two teams were in the quarterfinals.

=== Group A ===
==== Winner's bracket ====
Upper round 1
1 | Astralis | 1
8 | ENCE eSports | 0
4 | Cloud9 | 1
5 | Ninjas in Pyjamas | 0
3 | mousesports | 1
6 | Gambit Esports | 0
2 | Natus Vincere | 0
7 | G2 Esports | 1
Lower round 1
8 | ENCE eSports | 2
5 | Ninjas in Pyjamas | 0
6 | Gambit Esports | 0
2 | Natus Vincere | 2

Upper round 2
1 | Astralis | 2
4 | Cloud9 | 0
3 | mousesports | 1
7 | G2 Esports | 2
Lower round 2
3 | mousesports | 0
8 | ENCE eSports | 2
4 | Cloud9 | 0
2 | Natus Vincere | 2

Upper final
1 | Astralis | 2
7 | G2 Esports | 0
Lower qualifier
8 | ENCE eSports | 1
2 | Natus Vincere | 2

Astralis came in as the best team in the world and proved its dominance by easily handling ENCE eSports. Cloud9 had Martin "STYKO" Styk come in as a stand-in as the team struggled to find a permanent replacement for Pujan "FNS" Mehta and after STYKO was removed from the mousesports active lineup. Although STYKO struggled somewhat, Cloud9 had no problem taking care of Ninjas in Pyjamas, as the Swedes had only a few highlights in the game. mousesports also had a new player on the team after replacing STYKO with Janusz "Snax" Pogorzelski, as Snax left the legendary Polish squad Virtus.pro. However, mousesports did not need Snax to shine as mousesports easily took down Gambit Esports. In the first upset of the day, G2 Esports took down the rising Natus Vincere in a very close match as the French were able to overcome a 9–0 deficit as Edouard "SmithZz" Dubourdeaux shined. In the first best of three, Astralis was able to stifle a Cloud9 comeback on the first map and then erased all hopes in the second map with a 16–1 win as Nicolai "dev1ce" Reedtz dominated the field. G2 continued to crawl its way through the winner's bracket as Kenny "kennyS" Schrub showed why he was considered the best AWPer one time. Both G2 and Astralis secures spots in the playoffs. In the loser's bracket, ENCE pulled off a massive upset as Aleksi "allu" Jalli was able to completely thrash his former team and the Ninjas in Pyjamas were eliminated. Gambit had the unfortunate luck to run into a top three team in the first round of loser's as Gambit could do nothing to stop the power of Oleksandr "s1mple" Kostyliev, who many are calling the world's best player. Gambit was eliminated. ENCE somehow managed to pull off an even bigger upset against mousesports by sweeping the decorated European squad in two close maps as allu took revenge on another one of his former teams. Natus Vincere and Cloud9 were also part of a very close series, but it was s1mple to outduel Timothy "autimatic" Ta to eliminate Cloud9. In the winner's finals match, G2 made a massive comeback against the world's best, but Astralis was able to take the map into overtime. Astralis took that small wave of momentum into the next map and finished off G2 with ease to guarantee a spot in the semifinals. ENCE continued its Cinderella story as it took the first map against Na'Vi. In the second map, Na'Vi looked to easily take it, but Jere "sergej" Salo was rolling as ENCE started to make a comeback; however, Na'Vi was bailed out by s1mple and Denis "electronic" Sharipov and Na'Vi scraped by and then easily took the third map to move on to the playoffs.

Group A Results

Group A matches
| Team | Score | Map | Score | Team |
|---|---|---|---|---|
| Astralis | 16 | Nuke | 5 | ENCE eSports |
| Cloud9 | 16 | Inferno | 3 | Ninjas in Pyjamas |
| mousesports | 16 | Dust II | 8 | Gambit Esports |
| Natus Vincere | 14 | Inferno | 16 | G2 Esports |
| Astralis | 16 | Mirage | 12 | Cloud9 |
| Astralis | 16 | Overpass | 1 | Cloud9 |
| Astralis | – | Inferno | – | Cloud9 |
| mousesports | 14 | Dust II | 16 | G2 Esports |
| mousesports | 16 | Mirage | 10 | G2 Esports |
| mousesports | 9 | Inferno | 16 | G2 Esports |
| ENCE eSports | 16 | Inferno | 6 | Ninjas in Pyjamas |
| ENCE eSports | 16 | Train | 2 | Ninjas in Pyjamas |
| ENCE eSports | – | Nuke | – | Ninjas in Pyjamas |
| Gambit Esports | 6 | Overpass | 16 | Natus Vincere |
| Gambit Esports | 5 | Train | 16 | Natus Vincere |
| Gambit Esports | – | Inferno | – | Natus Vincere |
| mousesports | 17 | Inferno | 19 | ENCE eSports |
| mousesports | 12 | Mirage | 16 | ENCE eSports |
| mousesports | – | Dust II | – | ENCE eSports |
| Cloud9 | 14 | Inferno | 16 | Natus Vincere |
| Cloud9 | 12 | Overpass | 16 | Natus Vincere |
| Cloud9 | – | Train | – | Natus Vincere |
| Astralis | 19 | Dust II | 16 | G2 Esports |
| Astralis | 16 | Nuke | 4 | G2 Esports |
| Astralis | – | Overpass | – | G2 Esports |
| ENCE eSports | 16 | Dust II | 14 | Natus Vincere |
| ENCE eSports | 14 | Mirage | 16 | Natus Vincere |
| ENCE eSports | 7 | Nuke | 16 | Natus Vincere |

=== Group B ===
==== Winner's bracket ====
Upper round 1
1 | FaZe Clan | 1
8 | B.O.O.T-d[S] | 0
4 | mibr | 1
5 | Renegades | 0
3 | Fnatic | 1
6 | North | 0
2 | Team Liquid | 0
7 | BIG | 1
Lower round 1
8 | B.O.O.T-d[S] | 0
5 | Renegades | 2
6 | North | 2
2 | Team Liquid | 0

Upper round 2
1 | FaZe Clan | 2
4 | mibr | 0
3 | Fnatic | 2
7 | BIG | 0
Lower round 2
7 | BIG | 2
5 | Renegades | 1
4 | mibr | 2
6 | North | 1

Upper final
1 | FaZe Clan | 2
3 | Fnatic | 1
Lower qualifier
7 | BIG | 2
4 | mibr | 1

FaZe kicked off group B with a closer-than-expected match against B.O.O.T-dream[S]cape. The two top five players on FaZe, Nikola "NiKo" Kovač and Håvard "rain" Nygaard, were able to carry their team to an easy terrorist side to send the team from Singapore to the loser's bracket. mibr made its Global Offensive debut after signing one of CS:GO's most successful cores, but the legendary Brazilian brand struggled against the Noah "Nifty" Francis-lead Renegades. However, Gabriel "FalleN" Toledo's team showed signs of its old self: making improbable comebacks. Despite Renegades's 6–0 start and 10–5 halftime score, Marcelo "coldzera" David and Fernando "fer" Alvarenga showed why they were ranked as the best and third best players in 2017. Fnatic vs. North showcased two teams who had been struggling. Fnatic started out strong, but North winning five rounds in a row to start the second half suddenly made the game close. In the end, Fnatic was able to clutch out the 30th round to advance in the winner's bracket as Jesper "JW" Wecksell showed signs of the 2015 Fnatic days. BIG seemed eager to play in front of its home crowd and after picking up Owen "smooya" Butterfield, the team showed rapid paces of improvement. This showed in the match against Team Liquid, North America's best team as BIG was able to completely run over Liquid's defense. Although Jonathan "EliGE" Jablonowski topped the scoreboard out of all the ten players, the rest of his Liquid teammates struggled. After having never beaten any of FalleN's teams in his career, Finn "karrigan" Andersen found his second series win in a row in two relatively close maps as surprisingly karrigan topped the scoreboard over his superstars. In the other winner's match, Fnatic was able streak away with the series win after a close first half on the first map as the Swedes advance to the playoffs. In the loser's side, Renegades made quick work of B.O.O.T-dream[S]cape and eliminated the Singaporeans. Team Liquid struggled heavily at the event after falling to the declining North, even after a solid third-place finish at ESL One Belo Horizonte and a second-place finish at ECS Season 5. However, the American team fell to Mathias "MSL" Lauridsen's team and was ultimately eliminated. In a very tense best of three, it was the Australians and the Germans to provide the best series of the group stage. Renegades and BIG took one map each, but the third map was a toss-up. In the end BIG to end up on top in overtime behind Johannes "tabseN" Wodarz's 31 kills. Although not as exciting, North and mibr played a close best of three that went all three maps, but it was the star dup of fer and coldzera to outduel Valdemar "valde" Bjørn Vangså and North was eliminated. In the maps they won, the players of FaZe completely dominated Fnatic. The Swedes were able to take a map, but the result was not close. The final decider match ended up being a thriller. BIG and mibr were able to split the first two maps at the same score. The third map went to double overtime and mibr looked to take it. However, BIG was able to shut down mibr's offense and BIG would face G2 Esports in front of its home crowd. With mibr's exit, the two-time defending champions of ESL One Cologne was out of the tournament.

Group B Results

Group B matches
| Team | Score | Map | Score | Team |
|---|---|---|---|---|
| FaZe Clan | 16 | Dust II | 9 | B.O.O.T-dream[S]cape |
| mibr | 16 | Cache | 13 | Renegades |
| Fnatic | 16 | Inferno | 14 | North |
| Team Liquid | 7 | Dust II | 16 | BIG |
| FaZe Clan | 16 | Dust II | 9 | mibr |
| FaZe Clan | 16 | Mirage | 12 | mibr |
| FaZe Clan | – | Train | – | mibr |
| Fnatic | 16 | Cache | 10 | BIG |
| Fnatic | 16 | Train | 4 | BIG |
| Fnatic | – | Overpass | – | BIG |
| B.O.O.T-dream[S]cape | 8 | Cache | 16 | Renegades |
| B.O.O.T-dream[S]cape | 7 | Train | 16 | Renegades |
| B.O.O.T-dream[S]cape | – | Inferno | – | Renegades |
| North | 19 | Train | 16 | Team Liquid |
| North | 16 | Inferno | 11 | Team Liquid |
| North | – | Nuke | – | Team Liquid |
| BIG | 13 | Dust II | 16 | Renegades |
| BIG | 16 | Train | 12 | Renegades |
| BIG | 16 | Inferno | 17 | Renegades |
| mibr | 14 | Mirage | 16 | North |
| mibr | 16 | Overpass | 9 | North |
| mibr | 16 | Inferno | 12 | North |
| FaZe Clan | 16 | Overpass | 4 | Fnatic |
| FaZe Clan | 11 | Mirage | 16 | Fnatic |
| FaZe Clan | 16 | Inferno | 1 | Fnatic |
| BIG | 16 | Cache | 9 | mibr |
| BIG | 9 | Overpass | 16 | mibr |
| BIG | 22 | Inferno | 20 | mibr |

== Playoffs ==
The two runner-ups from each group each faced off in the quarterfinals. The top seeds in each group earned automatic berths to the playoffs. The quarterfinals and semifinals was best of three matches and the finals was a best of five.

Quarterfinals
B2 | Fnatic | 0
A3 | Natus Vincere | 2
A2 | G2 Esports | 0
B3 | BIG | 2

Semifinals
A1 | Astralis | 1
A3 | Natus Vincere | 2
B1 | FaZe Clan | 1
B3 | BIG | 2

Grand Finals
A3 | Natus Vincere | 3
B3 | BIG | 1

=== Quarterfinals ===
==== 1st quarterfinals ====
July 6, 2018; 13:25 CET | Report | Fnatic | 0–2 | Natus Vincere | Lanxess Arena, Cologne
Score by game:
12–16 | Natus Vincere won Overpass
10–16 | Natus Vincere won Train

While Natus Vincere was the favorite to win the series, Fnatic also had a good chance to steal the series away. However, the legendary Swedish brand struggled as Na'Vi took ten of the first eleven rounds before Fnatic managed to salvage a few rounds, but Fnatic was starting on the more favored side and Na'Vi looked to easily take the first map. Na'Vi eventually reached a 15-4 scoreline, but Fnatic started a massive comeback by getting eight unanswered rounds. Na'Vi would later close out the map, but Fnatic had momentum going into the next map. Na'Vi would shut down any momentum Fnatic had as the CIS team took the last six rounds of the first half. Fnatic would try to start another comeback, but it was too late as Na'Vi closed out the series, led by Egor "flamie" Vasilyev's 54 kills.

==== 2nd quarterfinals ====
July 6, 2018; 16:45 CET | Report | BIG | 2–0 | G2 Esports | Lanxess Arena, Cologne
Score by game:
BIG won Cache | 19–7
BIG won Dust II | 16–1

The dark horse of the tournament made it to the Lanxess Arena in front of its home crowd against G2's new lineup. The two sides would be close in the first map on Cache in both halves, as BIG won the first half 8–7 and G2 won the second half 8–7 to send the game into overtime. In the end, it was BIG to pull off what some would consider an upset over the French despite kennyS's massive 42 kills. The first map was a thriller, but the second map on Dust II would be the complete opposite. The Germans went up 13–0 before G2 even got a round on the board. BIG would push that one round loss off to the side and simply close out the game 16–1 to cruise to the semifinals, as smooya lead his team with 48 kills in the series.

=== Semifinals ===
==== 1st semifinals ====
July 7, 2018; 13:00 CET | Report | Astralis | 1–2 | Natus Vincere | Lanxess Arena, Cologne
Score by game:
13–16 | Natus Vincere won Overpass
Astralis won Nuke | 16–6
13–16 | Natus Vincere won Inferno

Na'Vi went up against the favorites of the tournament in the first semifinals. After the Danes took a 3–0 lead, Na'Vi went up 7–3 before Astralis could respond. At the end of the half, Na'Vi was up 9–6. However, Astralis was able to go up 10–9 and then 11–10 before taking a round loss that would ruin its economy. The teams would then go back and forth when Astralis made it a one-round game at 14–13. However, Na'Vi was able to shut down Astralis in the next round and then time out the terrorist side to take the first map. Astralis would fight back in the next map on Nuke as the world's number one took a 7–0 lead before Na'Vi got one on the board. However, Na'Vi would struggle as Astralis would easily take the second map despite s1mple's 24 kills. The third map went to Inferno. Na'Vi took a 10–5 halftime lead and then took the second half pistol round, so the CIS team looked to easily go up to at least a 13–5 lead. However, a force buy from the Danes proved successful as suddenly Astralis was only down one round after winning five unanswered. However, Na'Vi responded with four rounds of its own to get to map and series point. Astralis would take three more rounds. In the 29th round, Na'Vi started strong as Ioann "Edward" Sukhariev took down two Astralis players, but Astralis took down Edward and s1mple to make a 3 vs. 3. However, Astralis was not expecting flamie to be hiding and flamie took down two. Na'Vi would take down the last player to secure a spot in the finals. In a map in which the world's best player in s1mple struggle, Danylo "Zeus" Teslenko – a player who normally struggles to find kills – knocked down 31 kills to barely push Na'Vi to victory.

==== 2nd semifinals ====
July 7, 2018; 17:35 CET | Report | FaZe Clan | 1–2 | BIG | Lanxess Arena, Cologne
Score by game:
FaZe Clan won Dust II | 19–17
13–16 | BIG won Train
6–16 | BIG won Inferno

In the first map, FaZe looked to easily take down BIG after taking an 11–4 lead, including winning seven straight rounds. FaZe won the following pistol round, but BIG was able to counter. FaZe struggled to get rounds, but eventually reached map point at 15–13. BIG was led by Fatih "gob b" Dayik to take the last two rounds in regulation to send the game to overtime. After going back and forth, FaZe was able to string two rounds together to take Dust II. The next map went to Train. BIG took an early 6–1 lead, but FaZe won the remaining eight rounds of the half to take a 9–6 lead. However, BIG's second half would be on the counter-terrorist side, which is considered to be the more favored side on Train. FaZe was able to win four out of five rounds in the middle of the half, but BIG took care of business and closed another close game. The final map went to Inferno. BIG took a massive 12–3 lead; unlike the other games in the semifinals, no comeback happened despite FaZe's best efforts and the home crowd favorites pulled off a massive upset.

=== Grand Finals ===
July 8, 2018; 14:15 CET | Report | Natus Vincere | 3–1 | BIG | Lanxess Arena, Cologne
Score by game:
Natus Vincere won Overpass | 16–10
11–16 | BIG won Dust II
Natus Vincere won Train | 16–10
Natus Vincere won Inferno | 16–8

The grand finals started off on Overpass. After Na'Vi took a 4–2 lead, the rounds went back and forth and the half ended at 8–7 in favor of Na'Vi. Na'Vi went on the defensive afterwards and shut down most of the tactics BIG had, as the Germans could only put together three rounds, as Na'Vi slid into a 16–10 win. Dust II was a tad bit closer. Na'Vi took a 6–3 lead going into round ten, but BIG was able to figure things out as its terrorist side gave the German team an 8–7 lead. The two teams traded four rounds each in the second half, but BIG was able to pull out four more afterwards and evened the series at one. BIG once again took an 8–7 lead heading to the second half and even took a 10–7 lead. However, Na'Vi was on the more favored side and after a weak buy win, Na'Vi took that momentum and shut down BIG's offense to take the series lead. Inferno was the next map and once again there was an 8–7 lead, this time in favor of Na'Vi. However, on a map that is considered to be slightly terrorist sided, Na'Vi made it look lopsided as the CIS team took down the defense of BIG. BIG was able to salvage one round, but electronic's performance on the map outshined most of BIG's roster. After the match, s1mple was awarded as the MVP of the tournament.

== Final standings ==
The final standings are shown below. Each team's in-game leader is shown first.

| Place | Prize Money | Team | Roster | Coach |
|---|---|---|---|---|
| 1st | US$125,000 | Natus Vincere | Zeus, Edward, s1mple, electronic, flamie | kane |
| 2nd | US$50,000 | BIG | gob b, nex, tabseN, tiziaN, smooya | LEGIJA |
| 3rd – 4th | US$22,000 | Astralis | gla1ve, dupreeh, dev1ce, Magisk, Xyp9x | zonic |
| 3rd – 4th | US$22,000 | FaZe Clan | karrigan, cromen, GuardiaN, NiKo, rain | RobbaN |
| 5th–6th | US$11,000 | Fnatic | Xizt, draken, flusha, JW, KRiMZ | Jumpy |
| 5th–6th | US$11,000 | G2 Esports | Ex6TenZ, bodyy, kennyS, shox, SmithZz | NiaK |
| 7th–8th | US$7,500 | ENCE eSports | allu, Aerial, Aleksib, sergej, xseven | natu |
| 7th–8th | US$7,500 | mibr | FalleN, boltz, coldzera, fer, Stewie2K | |
| 9th–12th | US$6,000 | Cloud9 | tarik, autimatic, RUSH, Skadoodle, STYKO | valens |
| 9th–12th | US$6,000 | mousesports | chrisJ, oskar, ropz, Snax, suNny | lbmt |
| 9th–12th | US$6,000 | North | MSL, aizy, Kjaerbye, mertz, valde | ave |
| 9th–12th | US$6,000 | Renegades | Nifty, AZR, jks, USTILO, jkaem | Ryu |
| 13th–16th | US$5,000 | B.O.O.T-dream[S]cape | ImpressioN, benkai, splashske, Tommy, w1nt3r | dsn |
| 13th–16th | US$5,000 | Gambit Esports | Dosia, AdreN, HObbit, mou, mir | |
| 13th–16th | US$5,000 | Ninjas in Pyjamas | dennis, f0rest, GeT RiGhT, Lekr0, REZ | pita |
| 13th–16th | US$5,000 | Team Liquid | nitr0, EliGE, NAF, Twistzz, TACO | zews |
