= ESL Pro League Season 14 =

Counter-Strike: Global Offensive tournament

- 2021

Tournament information
- Sport: Counter-Strike: Global Offensive
- Location: Europe
- Dates: August 16–September 12, 2021
- Administrator: ESL
- Format: 24 team round-robin tournament 12 team single-elimination bracket
- Teams: 24

Final positions
- Champions: Natus Vincere
- Runner-up: Vitality
- MVP: Aleksandr "s1mple" Kostyliev

The ESL Pro League Season 14, abbreviated as EPL Season 14 and EPL XIV, was the fourteenth season of the ESL organized Counter-Strike: Global Offensive league, the ESL Pro League. Held between August 16 and September 12, 2021, as an online tournament, due to the COVID-19 pandemic. Part of the ESL Pro Tour, the season's twenty-four teams competed for a US$750,000 prize pool and for 7,400 ESL Pro Tour Points (EPT), used by ESL to determine the participants of its two main events each year, in Katowice and Cologne.

Ukrainian team Natus Vincere won the league for the first time, by beating French team Vitality 3–2 in the final. For the win Natus Vincere, received US$195,000 of the prize pool and an additional US$1,000,000, by becoming the third team to complete the Intel Grand Slam. Furthermore, Navi received 1,300 EPT, with Vitality receiving 1,000. Navi's Aleksandr "s1mple" Kostyliev was named the MVP.

== Background and format ==
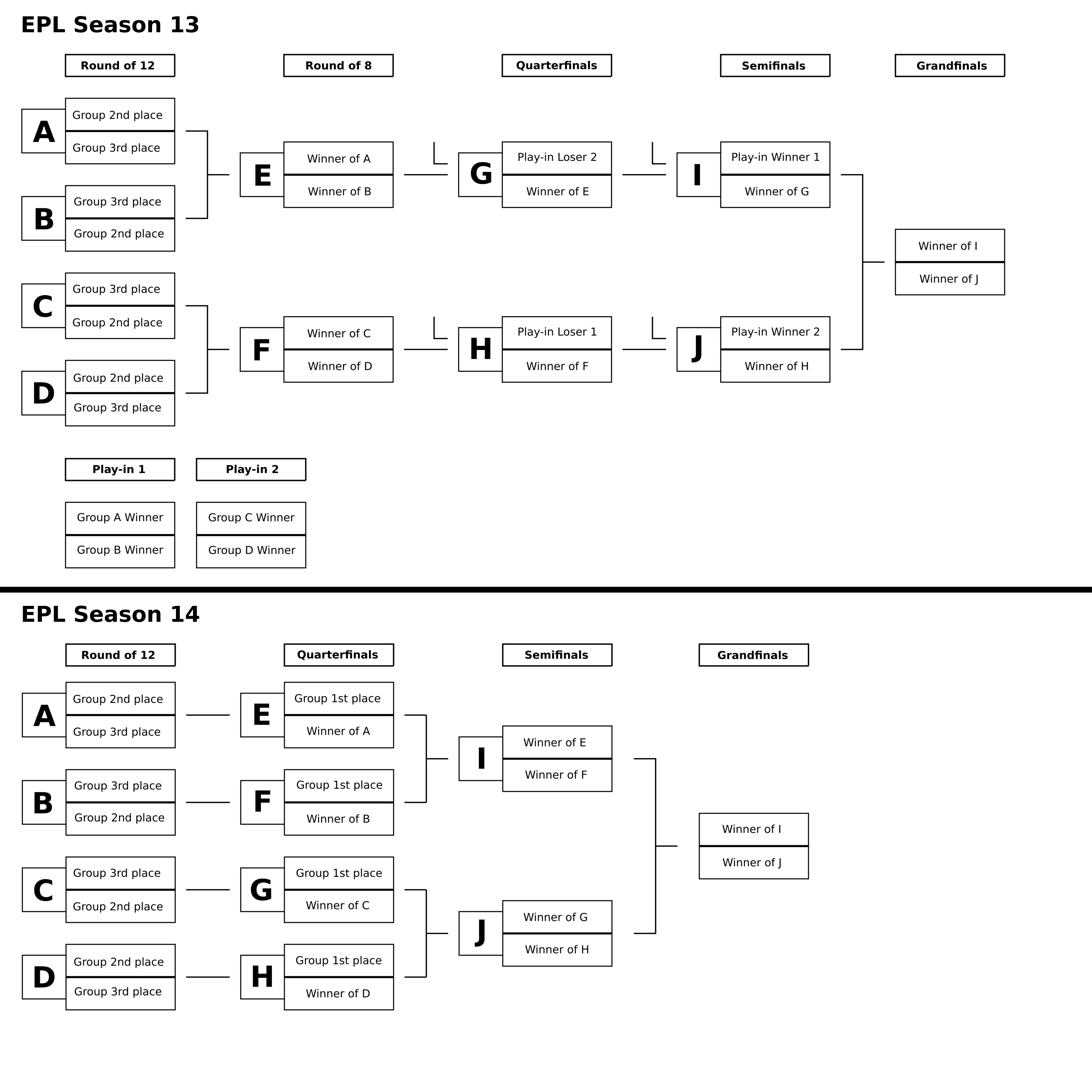
A comparison of the formats used.

The ESL Pro League is a Counter-Strike: Global Offensive league, organized by German esports company ESL. Season 13 concluded on April 11, 2021, with Danish team Heroic beating Russian team Gambit 2–3. The qualification period started immediately after, with initial plans for the season to be played on-sight in Malta, ESL announced on July 20, that all matches would be played online from Europe.

Initially planned to be a LAN-tournament, with the matches being played in Malta, the season was like the previous three seasons played online, due to the COVID-19 pandemic. The group stage of the season used the round-robin format; all teams in a group had to play once against each other in best-of-three matches. Each win gave a team three, each loss zero points. On July 27, ESL announced that the format of the tournament would change, removing the two play-off matches between the group's winner. Instead, the group's best-performing team would immediately advance to the quarterfinals, with the each group's second and third to play another match, to get the four last quarter finalist. According to ESL, the system was changed due to "feedback gathered from the community and in agreement with the teams and players".

=== Map pool ===
- Dust 2
- Mirage
- Inferno
- Overpass
- Nuke
- Vertigo
- Ancient

=== Teams competing ===
Like the previous season, 24 teams competed in the tournament. Twelve of those are permanent partners of ESL, therefore being invited directly to the season. Seven more teams were chosen by ESL, based on their positions on the companys CS:GO World Ranking. The five final teams qualified through tournaments held by ESL's partner, ESEA. Renegades qualified for the season in a one-of Oceania playoff against the team Order, winning 3–1 on June 29. However, on August 11, Renegades announced that they would not participate, citing travel restrictions due to the ongoing pandemic. Joshua "INS" Potter said in a video released via Twitter that "Unfortunately, due to the global pandemic right now, we will be unable to attend ESL Pro League". ESL replaced Renegades with the Russian team forZe. Bad News Bear and TeamOne qualified via winning the ESEA Premier Season 36 and 37 North America, respectively. Sinners qualified on June 27, winning the 37th Season of ESEA Premier, scoring 2–0 against Polish team AGO, making Sinners the first Czech team to play in the EPL.

Permanent partners

- Astralis
- Complexity Gaming
- ENCE
- Evil Geniuses
- Faze
- Fnatic
- G2 Esports
- mousesports
- Ninjas in Pyjamas
- Natus Vincere
- Team Liquid
- Vitality

Invited

- Gambit Esports
- Heroic
- Virtus.pro
- BIG
- Furia
- Team Spirit
- OG
- forZe (for Renegades)

Qualified

- Bad News Bears
- Renegades (Withdrawn)
- Entropiq
- TeamOne
- Sinners

=== Broadcast talent ===
Desk hosts

- Tres "stunna" Saranthus
- Jason "jKaplan" Kaplan

Analysts

- Janko "YNk" Paunović
- Jason "moses" O'Toole
- Mathieu "Maniac" Quiquerez

Sideline Reporters

- Frankie "Frankie" Ward
- Matthew "Sadokist" Trivett

Commentators

- Chad "Spunj" Burchill
- Alex "Machine" Richardson
- Harry "JustHarry" Russell
- Hugo Byron
- Jamie "TheEternalJay" Martin
- Jack "wolfy6678" Saunders
- George "Bofferz" Bray
- Daniel "DanChan" Challinor
- Joshua "Dweg" Nathan
- Dean "Dean" Brown

Observers

- Michael "MC" Campagna
- Alexander "Rushly" Rush
- Jake "Jak3y" Elton
- Ryan "ItsRandall" Randall

== Group stage ==
The group stage was divided into four groups each with six teams. Based on the tournament format, each team had to play five best-of-three matches. A win would be awarded with three points, a loss with zero. The group's best performing team would immediately advance to the quarterfinals, the second and third place had to play another best-of-three match in the round of twelve. Heroic and OG both won their group's without a single loss.

Key
†	Directly advanced to the Quarterfinals
#	Advanced to the play-offs
⁂	Failed to advance

=== Group A ===
Pos.	Team	W	L	P	
1.	Heroic	5	0	15	†
2.	Team Vitality	4	1	12	#
3.	ENCE	3	2	9	#
4.	Astralis	2	3	6	⁂
5.	Team Spirit	1	4	3	⁂
6.	Bad News Bears	0	5	0	⁂

=== Group B ===
Pos.	Team	W	L	P	
1.	OG	5	0	15	†
2.	forZe	4	1	12	#
3.	Complexity	3	2	9	#
4.	Virtus.pro	2	3	6	⁂
5.	Sinners	1	4	3	⁂
6.	G2 Esports	0	5	0	⁂

=== Group C ===
Pos.	Team	W	L	P	
1.	Natus Vincere	4	1	12	†
2.	mousesports	3	2	9	#
3.	Fnatic	3	2	9	#
4.	Faze Clan	3	2	9	⁂
5.	BIG	2	3	6	⁂
6.	Evil Geniuses	0	5	0	⁂

=== Group D ===
Pos.	Team	W	L	P	
1.	Gambit Esports	4	1	12	†
2.	Team Liquid	4	1	12	#
3.	Ninjas in Pyjamas	3	2	9	#
4.	Entropiq	2	3	6	⁂
5.	Furia	2	3	6	⁂
6.	TeamOne	0	5	0	⁂

== Playoffs ==
=== Bracket ===
Quarterfinals
Natus Vincere	2
ENCE	0
Heroic	2
Team Liquid	1
OG	2
Ninjas in Pyjamas	1
Gambit Esports	0
Vitality	2

Semifinals
Natus Vincere	2
Heroic	1
OG	0
Vitality	2

Finals
Natus Vincere	3
Vitality	2

=== Round of 12 ===
mousesports vs. Ninjas in Pyjamas
Team	Sc.	Map	Sc.	Team
mousesports	12	Ancient	16	Ninjas in Pyjamas
mousesports	16	Vertigo	6	Ninjas in Pyjamas
mousesports	8	Inferno	16	Ninjas in Pyjamas
Played online on September 7, 2021; 16:00 CET

Complexity vs. Vitality
Team	Sc.	Map	Sc.	Team
Complexity	6	Vertigo	16	Vitality
Complexity	16	Overpass	9	Vitality
Complexity	12	Mirage	16	Vitality
Played online on September 7, 2021; 19:35 CET

Team Liquid vs. fnatic
Team	Sc.	Map	Sc.	Team
Team Liquid	16	Nuke	4	fnatic
Team Liquid	25	Dust 2	21	fnatic
Team Liquid	—	Mirage	—	fnatic
Played online on September 8, 2021; 19:15 CET

forZe vs. ENCE
Team	Sc.	Map	Sc.	Team
forZe	5	Nuke	16	ENCE
forZe	11	Mirage	16	ENCE
forZe	—	Ancient	—	ENCE
Played online on September 10, 2021; 16:00 CET

=== Quarterfinals ===
OG vs. Ninjas in Pyjamas
Team	Sc.	Map	Sc.	Team
OG	15	Overpass	19	Ninjas in Pyjamas
OG	16	Mirage	12	Ninjas in Pyjamas
OG	16	Dust2	4	Ninjas in Pyjamas
Played online on September 9, 2021; 16:00 CET

Gambit Esports vs. Team Vitality
Team	Sc.	Map	Sc.	Team
Gambit Esports	11	Inferno	16	Team Vitality
Gambit Esports	14	Vertigo	16	Team Vitality
Gambit Esports	—	Overpass	—	Team Vitality
Played online on September 9, 2021; 19:55 CET

Natus Vincere vs. ENCE
Team	Sc.	Map	Sc.	Team
Natus Vincere	16	Ancient	2	ENCE
Natus Vincere	16	Nuke	5	ENCE
Natus Vincere	—	Mirage	—	ENCE
Played online on September 10, 2021; 16:00 CET

Heroic vs. Team Liquid
Team	Sc.	Map	Sc.	Team
Heroic	12	Overpass	16	Team Liquid
Heroic	16	Nuke	12	Team Liquid
Heroic	19	Inferno	16	Team Liquid
Played online on September 10, 2021; 19:15 CET

=== Semifinals ===
OG vs. Vitality
Team	Sc.	Map	Sc.	Team
OG	12	Mirage	16	Vitality
OG	7	Nuke	16	Vitality
OG	—	Inferno	—	Vitality
Played online on September 11, 2021; 16:00 CET

Natus Vincere vs. Heroic
Team	Sc.	Map	Sc.	Team
Natus Vincere	16	Mirage	14	Heroic
Natus Vincere	13	Overpass	16	Heroic
Natus Vincere	16	Nuke	14	Heroic
Played online on September 11, 2021; 19:45 CET

=== Final ===
Natus Vincere vs. Vitality
Team	Sc.	Map	Sc.	Team
Natus Vincere	16	Dust2	10	Vitality
Natus Vincere	6	Inferno	16	Vitality
Natus Vincere	16	Nuke	11	Vitality
Natus Vincere	7	Overpass	16	Vitality
Natus Vincere	16	Mirage	14	Vitality
Played online on September 12, 2021; 16:00 CET

== Post-season ==
For winning the tournament, Natus Vincere received US$195,000 of the US$750,000 prize pool (26%) and a spot in the BLAST Premier World Final 2021, which will be held in December 2021. With the win, Navi became the third team to complete the Intel Grand Slam, a special Intel sponsored competition, awarding US$1,000,000 to the first team to either win "six ESL Pro Tour Masters tournaments inside a span of ten consecutive events" or winning "four ESL Pro Tour Masters tournaments inside a span of ten consecutive events, inclusive of a Championship level". Navi's run started with winning IEM Katowice 2020 in February 2020, the DreamHack Masters Spring 2021 in April, IEM Cologne 2021 and finally EPL Season 14. Furthermore, the team received 1300 Pro Tour Points, which are used by ESL to determine the participants of its two main events each year—Katowice and Cologne. The team accumulated 4137,50 Points by September 12, 2021. Navi's Aleksandr "s1mple" Kostyliev was named the seasons Most valuable player (MVP), giving him his third MVP in a row and the 16th of his career.

French runner-ups Vitality received US$80,000 (10,7 %) of the prize pool and 1,000 Pro Tour Points. By September 12, Vitality accumulated 2162,50 points, placing them seventh on the leaderboard. Mathieu "ZywOo" Herbaut was the second best-performing player of the tournament, with the a 1.31 rating. Heroic and OG each received US$55,000 and 780 PTP. According to eSports Charts the season's final was watched by more than 750,000 viewers with an average viewership of around 130,000 per match.

== Final standings ==
Pos.	Team	Price money	PTP
1.	Natus Vincere	US$195,000 + US$1,000,000	1300
2.	Vitality	US$80,000	1000
3. – 4.	Heroic	US$55,000	780
3. – 4.	OG	US$55,000	780
5. – 8.	Gambit	US$33,750	485
5. – 8.	Team Liquid	US$33,750	485
5. – 8.	ENCE	US$28,750	485
5. – 8.	Ninjas in Pyjamas	US$28,750	485
9. – 12.	forZe	US$30,000	250
9. – 12.	Fnatic	US$25,000	250
9. – 12.	Complexity	US$25,000	250
9. – 12.	mousesports	US$25,000	250
13. – 16.	Faze Clan	US$22,000	100
13. – 16.	Entropiq	US$17,000	100
13. – 16.	Virtus.pro	US$17,000	100
13. – 16.	Astralis	US$17,000	100
17. – 20.	Furia	US$15,000	50
17. – 20.	BIG	US$15,000	50
17. – 20.	Sinners	US$10,000	50
17. – 20.	Team Spirit	US$10,000	50
21. – 24.	TeamOne	US$3,000	0
21. – 24.	Evil Geniuses	US$3,000	0
21. – 24.	G2	US$3,000	0
21. – 24.	Bad News Bears	US$3,000	0
