= Alternate Attax =

German esports organization

- Short name: ATN
- Divisions: Counter-Strike 2; FIFA
- Founded: August 2003
- Team history: Alternate Attax (2003–2008); Team Alternate (2008–2016); Alternate Attax (2016–present)
- Based in: Dresden
- Location: Germany
- CEO: Christian Rose
- Manager: Stephan "Scars" Barth
- Parent group: Alternate
- Website: www.alternate-attax.de

Alternate Attax (stylized ALTERNATE aTTaX) is a professional esports organization owned by German e-commerce company Alternate. The team was established in August 2003 and made its first appearance at the Games Convention later that year. Alternate Attax currently fields players in Counter-Strike 2 and FIFA.

== Counter-Strike: Global Offensive ==
Alternate Attax upset GODSENT on 8 September 2016 to qualify for ELeague Season 2.

In June 2016, Florian "syrsoN" Rische was added to the Alternate Attax roster.

In December 2019, Mateusz "mantuu" Wilczewski was signed by OG. Sabit "mirbit" Coktasar was brought onto the team as a replacement along with Robin "ScrunK" Röpke, who now coaches the team.

On 25 October 2024, ALTERNATE aTTaX put their pro Counter-Strike division on hold.

=== Roster ===
ALTERNATE aTTaX Counter-Strike 2 roster
Players
Coaches

Handle	Name	Nationality
awzek	Napoloni, Michalis	Greece
FreeZe	Hegmann, Lukas	Germany
PerX	von Erdmannsdorff, Paul	Germany
PANIX	Hangebruch, Max	Germany

Head coach

Sebastian "xenn" Hoch

Legend:
- (I) Inactive
- (S) Suspended
- Substitute
- (injured) Injury / Illness

Latest roster transaction: 29 December 2023.

=== Notable achievements ===
- 1st – WSVG Finals New York
- 1st – ESL Pro Series Season VIII
- 1st – WWCL Season #5
- 1st – GIGA Liga Grand Slam Season 1
- 2nd – ISC 2006
- 3rd – ESWC 2006
- 1st – ESL Pro Series Season X

== FIFA ==
=== Roster ===
ID	Name
AzZze	Patrick Straschek

== Organization ==
ID	Name	Title
w1zard	Lennart Kreuter	Manager
Christian Rose	Christian Rose	CEO
f4nz0	Fabio Schlößer Vila	Creative Director
Rupert Hoop	Rupert Hoop	Sport Psychologist
