= Mopoz =

Spanish professional Counter-Strike player

Alejandro “Mopoz” Fernández-Quejo Cano

Personal information
- Born: Alejandro Fernández-Quejo Cano; August 7, 1996 (age 29); El Escorial, Spain
- Nationality: Spanish

Career information
- Games: Counter-Strike 2, formerly Counter-Strike: Global Offensive
- Role: Entry fragger

Team history
- 2015: Wizards
- 2017–2023: Movistar Riders
- 2024: Movistar KOI
- 2025: Iberian Soul
- 2025–present: Gentle Mates

Alejandro “Mopoz” Fernández-Quejo Cano (born August 7, 1996) is a Spanish professional Counter-Strike player who has competed at top levels of both Counter-Strike: Global Offensive and Counter-Strike 2.

== Early life and career ==
Alejandro Fernández-Quejo Cano was born on August 7, 1996, in El Escorial, Spain. He began his competitive Counter-Strike journey in the early 2010s playing locally before moving into the professional scene with appearances on teams such as Wizards and Newskill Infinity. His early professional experience included stints with various Spanish teams, helping him start a career as an entry fragger.

== Professional career ==
=== Movistar Riders ===
In 2017, mopoz joined the Spanish esports organization Movistar Riders, where he played for several years. During his time with Movistar Riders, he competed in major tournaments and contributed to the team's achievements in national and international CS:GO events.

At IEM Cologne 2022, mopoz was recognized for his performance by being included in the tournament's top performers list according to one esports outlet, highlighting his impact at the event.

=== KOI and other teams ===
In 2024, mopoz signed with Movistar KOI, a competitive roster that participated in several Counter-Strike 2 events throughout the year. In 2025 he briefly played for Iberian Soul before joining Gentle Mates later that year, continuing his professional career in CS2.

== Playstyle ==
Mopoz is known for his role as an entry fragger, tasked with taking early engagements and creating space for his team during matches. He's kept his aggressive style and experience in both CS:GO and CS2 competitions.

== Achievements ==
Mopoz has competed in numerous esports tournaments throughout his career, including ESL Pro League Season 15 and ESL Pro League Season 18, Master League Portugal, the CCT European Series, and Galaxy Battle events. His consistent participation at high levels over many years is reflected in his earnings, of approximately $159,145.

He also won ESL Challenger at Dreamhack Valencia in 2022 against outsiders.

Mopoz has also played two Counter Strike majors, PGL Major Stockholm 2021 and PGL Major Copenhagen 2024.
