= Plopski =

Spanish-Swedish professional Counter-Strike player

Current team
- Team: Metizport
- Role: Rifler / Entry
- Game(s): Counter-Strike 2, formerly Counter-Strike: Global Offensive

Personal information
- Born: Nicolás González Zamora; May 14, 2002 (age 24); Sweden
- Nationality: Spanish, Swedish

Career information
- Playing career: 2017–present

Team history
- 2017–2018: x6tence
- 2018: Singularity (loan)
- 2019: Ancient
- 2019–2022: Ninjas in Pyjamas
- 2023–2024: GODSENT
- 2024–present: Metizport

Nicolás "Plopski" González Zamora (born May 14, 2002) is a Spanish-Swedish professional esports player specializing in Counter-Strike 2 and formerly Counter-Strike: Global Offensive (CS:GO). He plays as a rifler and entry fragger and has competed for European organizations such as Ninjas in Pyjamas, Godsent, and Metizport.

== Career ==
=== Early career ===
Plopski began his professional career in 2017 with Spanish organization x6tence, gaining experience on the European amateur scene.

=== Ninjas in Pyjamas ===
In June 2019, Plopski joined Swedish organization Ninjas in Pyjamas (NiP), replacing Dennis "dennis" Edman. During his time at NiP, he played alongside veteran players such as Patrik f0rest Lindberg and Christopher GeT RiGhT Alesund.

=== GODSENT ===
After leaving NiP in late 2022, Plopski signed with Swedish organization GODSENT in 2023, competing in both CS:GO and early CS2 events.

=== Metizport ===
In May 2024, Plopski joined Norwegian organization Metizport to participate in major CS2 tournaments, including the BLAST.tv Austin Major.

== Style of play ==
Plopski is known for his rifler and entry fragging role, combining aggressive playmaking with map control presence.

== Achievements ==
Plopski has participated in multiple ESL and BLAST Premier events, with earnings exceeding $250,000, and reached top finishes in several Global Esports Tour tournaments.
