= Godsent =

Swedish esports team

GODSENT
- Game: Counter-Strike: Global Offensive; Dota 2 League of Legends; Hearthstone; Rainbow Six: Siege
- Founded: 4 April 2016
- Location: Sweden
- Head coach: Maikil "Golden" Selim
- Manager: Markus "pronax" Wallsten
- Website: godsent.gg

Godsent (stylized GODSENT) is a Swedish professional esports organization formed by Markus "pronax" Wallsten. It currently has teams competing in Counter-Strike: Global Offensive, Dota 2, Hearthstone, Rainbow Six: Siege, Apex Legends and League of Legends.

== History ==
After his departure from the ex-Fnatic line up, pronax set off to create his own team. On 15 August 2016, GODSENT acquired most of the old line up which consisted of pronax, Jesper "JW" Wecksell, Robin "flusha" Rönnquist, Freddy "Krimz" Johansson, this happened by Player trade within the Swedish CS:GO pro-scene, losing both Jonas "Lekr0" Olofsson and Simon "twist" Eliasson to Fnatic and with Mathias "pauf" Köhler stepping back from professional CS:GO. Later on another shuffle between GODSENT and Fnatic took place and the teams traded back Lekr0 and KRiMZ.

GODSENT was upset by Alternate aTTaX in the ELeague Season 2 qualifiers and lost their spot in the league.

On 6 November 2016, the team won the European Minor Championship final against Hellraisers guaranteeing a spot on the LAN qualifier for the next CS:GO Major - ELEAGUE Major, Atlanta.

On 21 June 2018, the team announced that they have ceased all operations immediately. GODSENT stated that the decision was made "unanimously by all the parties" involved in the management of the organisation and that shutting down was "the best solution for everyone involved."

In September 2019, GODSENT resumed operations after it merged with The Final Tribe, a Swedish esports organization. Later that year, in November, it acquired SMASH Esports's CS:GO roster.

In April 2020, GODSENT acquired two Tom Clancy's Rainbow Six Siege rosters.

On 13 January 2023, GODSENT acquired an entirely new roster, consisting of Erik "ztr" Gustafsson, on loan from Ninjas in Pyjamas' academy team, William "draken" Sundin, Nicolas "Plopski" Gonzalez Zamora, Joel "joel" Holmlund, and Alfred "RuStY" Karlsson. Maikil "Golden" Selim became the team's new head coach.

On 6 August 2023, GODSENT announced a new roster featuring Jonatan "Bobeksde" Persson and Johan "hype" Engblom alongside ztr and Plopski, with Golden becoming a player. The head coach position was taken by former Fnatic Rising player Kevin "Kevve" Bohlin.

== Rosters ==
=== Counter-Strike: Global Offensive ===
Godsent Counter-Strike: Global Offensive roster
Players
Coaches

Handle	Name	Nationality
ztr	Gustafsson, Erik	Sweden
Bobeksde	Persson, Jonatan	Sweden
Plopski	Gonzalez Zamora, Nicolas	Sweden
hype	Engblom, Johan	Sweden
Golden	Selim, Maikil	Sweden

Head coach

Kevin "Kevve" Bohlin

Legend:
- (I) Inactive
- (S) Suspended
- Substitute
- (injured) Injury / Illness

Roster updated 6 August 2023.
