= Twistzz =

Canadian professional Counter-Strike player

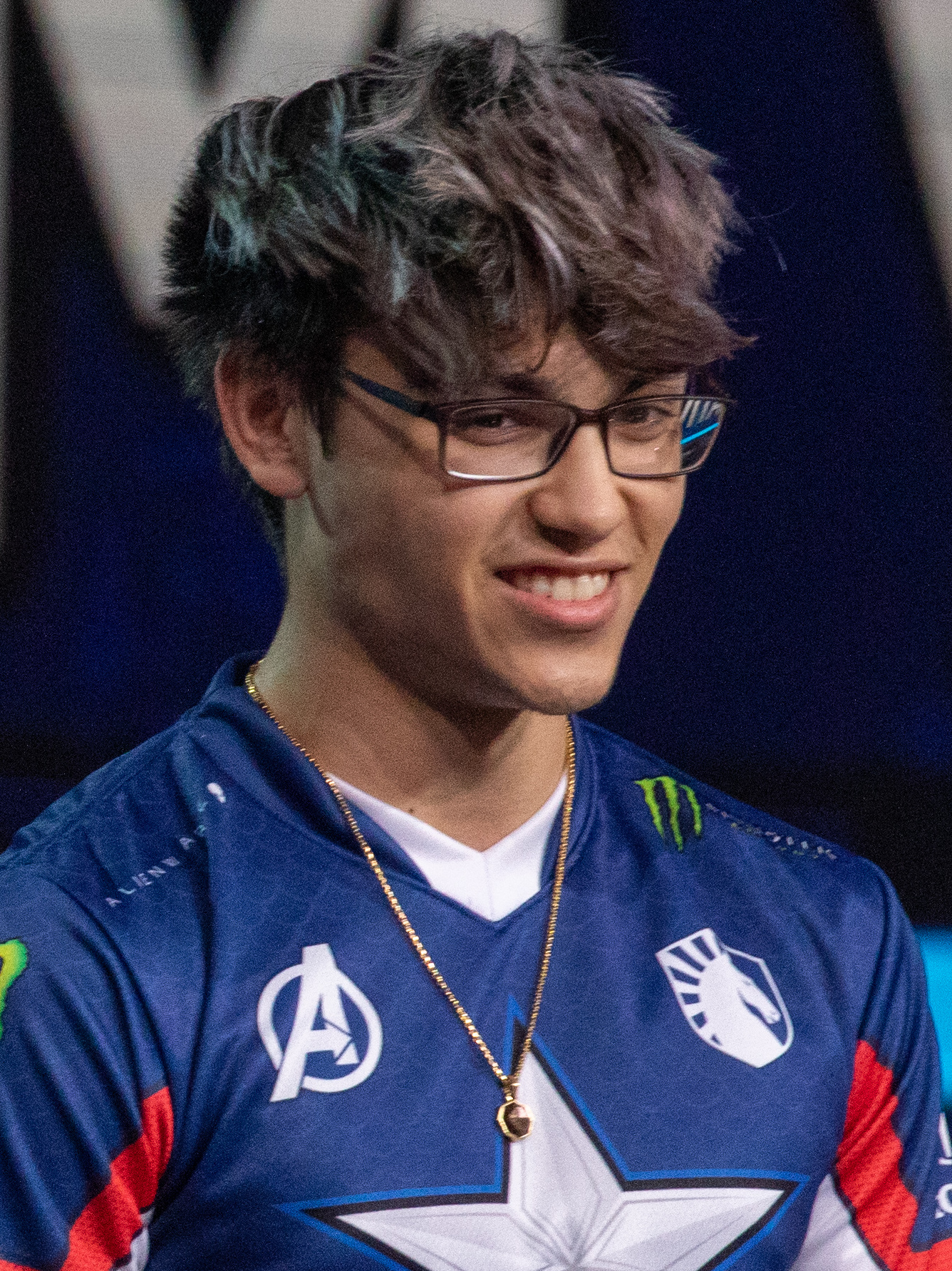
- Twistzz during Intel Extreme Masters Chicago 2019

Personal information
- Name: Russel Van Dulken
- Born: November 14, 1999 (age 27)
- Nationality: Canadian
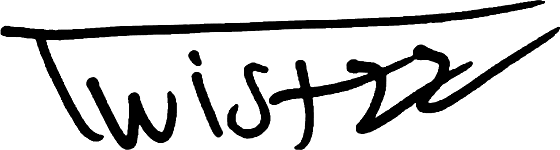
- Signature

Current team
- Team: FaZe Clan
- Role: In-Game Leader
- Games: Counter-Strike: Global Offensive; Counter-Strike 2

Career information
- Playing career: 2015–present

Team history
- 2016: Team AGG
- 2016–2017: Team SoloMid
- 2017: Misfits Gaming
- 2017–2020: Team Liquid
- 2021–2023: FaZe Clan
- 2023–2025: Team Liquid
- 2025–present: FaZe Clan

Career highlights and awards
- Counter-Strike Major champion (Antwerp 2022); 2× IEM Grand Slam champion (Season 2, Season 4); 6× HLTV Top 20 Player of the Year (2018, 2019, 2021, 2022, 2023, 2025); 2× HLTV MVP; 12× HLTV "Big Event" Champion

Russel David Kevin Van Dulken (born November 14, 1999), better known as Twistzz, is a Canadian professional Counter-Strike 2 player for FaZe Clan. He has previously played for top teams such as Team SoloMid, Misfits, and Team Liquid. Twistzz was named the MVP of ESL One New York 2018 and IEM Sydney 2019 by HLTV.

== Early life ==
Twistzz was born on November 14, 1999. He began playing video games with his dad and his first FPS game was Quake. After his father moved away, Twistzz started playing games for longer periods of time. Twistzz and his mom eventually moved in with her boyfriend and Twistzz started playing Counter-Strike: Global Offensive (CS:GO). His mom's boyfriend started verbally abusing Twistzz which stalled his progress in CS:GO. In 2014 his mom chose to leave her boyfriend and Twistzz was able to make progress in CS:GO once again. His mom was supportive of him playing CS:GO because she was aware of where he was at all times.

== Career ==
=== 2015 ===
Twistzz joined his first professional team Tectonic in October 2015. In December 2015, Twistzz joined SapphireKelownaDotCom along with veteran in-game leader Kyle "OCEAN" O'Brien. SapphireKelownaDotCom were signed by AGG in February 2016. Even at this early stage people would start seeing that he is a promising up-and-comer.

=== 2016 ===
In March, team AGG released their roster and Twistzz joined team KKona with his ex-AGG teammates for a week before receiving a stand-in offer from his first large organization, Team SoloMid (TSM), along with another veteran In-Game Leader Sean Gares. Eventually, Twistzz was signed by TSM on a permanent basis.

=== 2017 ===
In January, TSM released Twistzz along with his teammates allowing Misfits Gaming to pick up the roster. In April, Twistzz joined Team Liquid after the departure of Jacob "Pimp" Winneche. On Liquid, Twistzz and Liquid placed 2nd at two big events, ESL One New York 2017 and ESG Tour Mykonos. In November Twistzz's Liquid won the Americas Minor Championship for ELEAGUE Boston 2017.

=== 2018 ===
In January, Twistzz's Liquid placed 14th at the ELEAGUE Major: Boston 2018 with their coach Wilton "zews" Prado standing in for Lucas "steel" Lopes, due to roster-lock rules at the time. In February Twistzz's Liquid beat Cloud9 in the finals to win cs_summit 2, which would be their first win at an event in 2018.

In April, Twistzz's Liquid ESL Pro League Season 7 final. Liquid continued to place 2nd against Astralis at the ECS Season 5 Finals and ELEAGUE Season Premier 2018.

In the second major of 2018, The FACEIT London Major 2018, his performances helped Liquid secure 1st place in the new challenger's stage by going 3-0. Twistzz achieved a Performance Rating 2.0 of 1.47 against HellRaisers, in which Liquid won 16-9, and an even more impressive rating of 1.54 against Vega Squadron, in which Liquid won 19-17 in overtime in the New Challenger's Stage.

Going into the New Legends Stage, Team Liquid would go 3–0, beating Winstrike, where Liquid won 16–7, and Twistzz would achieve his most impressive rating in the tournament of 1.79. This would be followed by a 16–10 win over Ninjas in Pyjamas, with Twistzz getting a rating of 1.44. Team Liquid would then go onto beat HLTV's #1 Rated team at the time, Astralis 19–15, Twistzz having a quiet Performance Rating 2.0 of 1.06.

The next stage of the FACEIT London Major was The Playoffs. Liquid would face HellRaisers yet again winning 2–1 with Twistzz amounting to a Performance Rating 2.0 of 1.16, going through into the Semi Finals of the second Major of 2018. Liquid would go up against Astralis in the Semi Final, this time losing 2–0, going out of the Major. However Twistzz would still get a rating of 0.92.

After the FACEIT London Major, Twistzz and Liquid would go on to place 2nd at ESL One New York 2018 (Twistzz receiving the MVP award), IEM Chicago 2018 and at the ESL Pro League Season 8 Finals. However, Liquid would win SuperNova CS:GO Malta which did have the caveat of not having Astralis in attendance and was not considered a High Tier tournament.

=== 2019 ===
In January, HLTV named Twistzz the 12th best professional player of 2018. Liquid were finally able to beat their rival Astralis in a best of 3 final at the iBUYPOWER Masters 2019 tournament. Team Liquid would place 5th-8th at the major, losing to the underdogs ENCE in the quarterfinals. In May, at IEM Sydney 2019, Liquid went undefeated and secured 1st place, and Twistzz won his first big event. Twistzz was named MVP at this event and had an average HLTV rating of 1.25. In June, Liquid won DreamHack Masters Dallas 2019 and the ESL Pro League Season 9 Finals, beating their rivals Astralis in the round of 6. At ESL One Cologne 2019 Liquid won the Intel Grand Slam worth $1 million in addition to the tournament itself. Despite Team Liquid coming into the Starladder Berlin Major as heavy favorites, they scraped out of the group stage 3–2, and lost to Astralis in the quarterfinals.

=== 2021 ===
In January, Twistzz joined FaZe Clan, replacing Kjaerbye. Twistzz had underperforming results for the rest of 2021 other than an impressive performance where FaZe Clan finished in the 3rd-4th position at IEM Cologne 2021, the first CS:GO tournament event since the start of the COVID-19 pandemic.

=== 2022 ===
In January, HLTV named Twistzz the 17th best professional player of 2021. Going into 2022, FaZe Clan removed long time player Olof "olofmeister" Kajbjer in favour of four-time HLTV Top 20 player, Robin "ropz" Kool. Following the addition, Twistzz and FaZe got off to a hot start, finishing 1st-4th in the BLAST Premier Spring Groups, advancing to the Spring Finals, 1st in IEM Katowice 2022 and 1st in ESL Pro League Season 15. In May, Twistzz won his first Major championship at the PGL Major Antwerp 2022, making him the second North American player (other than Stewie2K) to win both a Major championship and an Intel Grand Slam in his career to date. After two disappointing results post-Major, the FaZe team played in the online Roobet Cup, where they finished second, losing to BIG Clan. After the successful Roobet Cup run, which was used to enlarge FaZe's map pool, the team went into IEM Cologne as favourites despite dropping to the #2 team in the world by HLTV. They would meet #1 ranked Natus Vincere, where Faze won 3-2 (On Maps), becoming the first team in CS:GO history to win all 3 of: IEM Katowice, The Major, IEM Cologne in one year.

=== 2023 ===
In March, FaZe placed 1st in ESL Pro League Season 17 and won the Intel Grand Slam Season 4, making Twistzz the first player to win two Grand Slams.

In December, Twistzz left FaZe Clan to return to Team Liquid.

=== 2024 ===
In the second half of 2024, with the benching of Liquid's in-game leader cadiaN, Twistzz became in-game leader for the team.

=== 2025 ===
In June 2025, Team Liquid signed polish player Kamil "Siuhy" Szkaradek, who replaced Justin "jks" Savage and took over the IGL role from Twistzz. Team Liquid faced poor results throughout 2025, exiting the BLAST.TV Austin Major 0–3, and failing to qualify for ESL Pro League Season 22.

On September 13, during FISSURE Playground 2, Liquid announced the departure of Twistzz following the conclusion of the event. Later the same day, FaZe Clan announced his return to their roster ahead of ESL Pro League Season 22. In the StarLadder Budapest Major, Twistzz and his team made it through to the grand finals from Stage 1 after nearly losing to RED Canids in the 1-2 bracket.

=== 2026 ===
On 13 January 2026, Twistzz would play his first tournament game of the year, losing 1-2 to Eyeballers in the BLAST Bounty 2026 Season 1 tournament and subsequently being eliminated from the tournament. Throughout February, FaZe Clan would continue underperforming, being eliminated from PGL Cluj-Napoca 2026 and IEM Krakow 2026 in the group play stages. Despite these results from the FaZe Clan team, Twistzz would perform well in matches, being on average, the second highest rated player on the team.

Following FaZe Clan in-game leader karrigan's departure on April 20, Twistzz took on the IGL role in the team. The first event he attended in this new role was BLAST Rivals 2026, where FaZe qualified for the playoffs after an underdog 2-1 victory over FURIA, placing 3rd-4th after a loss to NAVI.

== Notable tournament results ==
Bold denotes a Counter-Strike Major.

Year	Place	Tournament	Team	Winning Score	Opponent	Prize Money	Awards	Ref
2025	2nd	**StarLadder Budapest Major 2025**	FaZe	1:3	Vitality	$170,000		
2023	1st	CS Asia Championships 2023	FaZe	2:0	MOUZ	$250,000		
2023	1st	Thunderpick World Championship 2023	FaZe	2:0	Virtus Pro	$250,000		
2023	1st	ESL Pro League Season 17	FaZe	3:1	Cloud9	$200,000		
2022	1st	IEM Cologne 2022	FaZe	3:2	NAVI	$400,000		
2022	1st	**PGL Major Antwerp 2022**	FaZe	2:0	NAVI	$500,000		
2022	1st	ESL Pro League Season 15	FaZe	3:1	ENCE	$190,000		
2022	1st	IEM Katowice 2022	FaZe	3:0	G2	$400,000		
2019	1st	ESL Pro League Season 9	Liquid	3:1	G2	$250,000		
