= Stewie2K =

American streamer and esports player (born 1998)

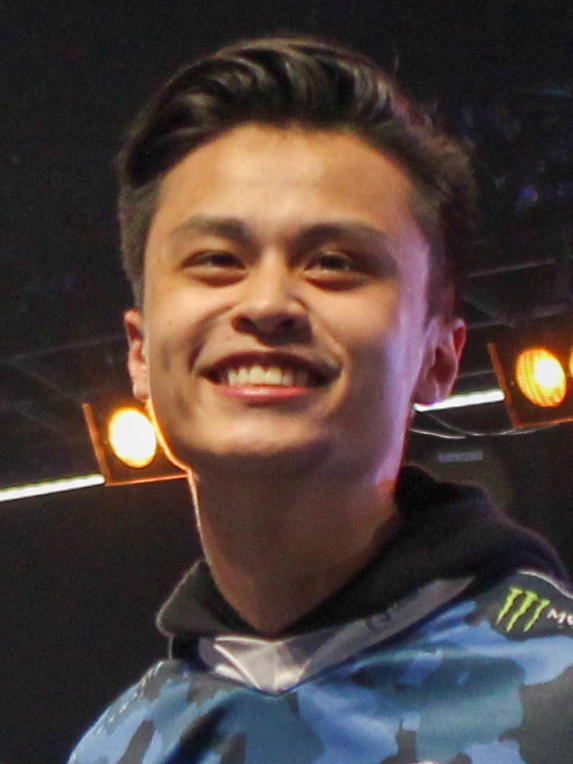
- Stewie2K in 2019

Personal information
- Name: Jacky Yip
- Nickname: Stew
- Born: January 7, 1998 (age 28)
- Nationality: American

Career information
- Games: Counter-Strike: Global Offensive; Counter-Strike 2
- Playing career: 2016–2024
- Role(s): In-game leader Rifler (entry fragger)

Team history
- 2015: SKDC
- 2015: ex-eLevate
- 2015: Splyce
- 2016–2018: Cloud9
- 2018: SK Gaming
- 2018: MIBR
- 2018–2022: Team Liquid
- 2022: Evil Geniuses
- 2024: Legacy (stand-in)
- 2024: G2 Esports (stand-in)
- 2025: Wildcard (stand-in)

Career highlights and awards
- CS:GO Major champion (Boston 2018); IEM Grand Slam champion (Season 2); 9× HLTV "Big Event" Champion; 2× HLTV MVP

Jacky "Jake" Yip (born January 7, 1998), better known as Stewie2K, is an American streamer and a professional Counter-Strike: Global Offensive and Counter-Strike 2 player. As a member of Cloud9, he became the first North American (along with four of his teammates) to win a Valve-sponsored major in CS:GO.

== Early life ==
Yip was born on January 7, 1998. Raised in San Francisco, California, he picked up Counter-Strike 1.6 from his older brother, Jason. Yip grew up with his brother and sister. His parents were often on business trips in China. Yip described his parents as "stereotypical Asian parents" who disapproved of video games, wanting him to take up a "common" career such as a lawyer or a doctor. His draw towards video games ultimately created a rift between him and his parents, with Yip recalling his mother believing he was going to be a failure. Her disdain for gaming made Yip feel that his mother had failed him and ultimately drove him out of his own home. At the age of 17, Stewie flew to LA to pursue his own interests in gaming.

Yip stopped playing Counter-Strike 1.6 for a time in favor of other games such as RuneScape, MapleStory, League of Legends and Call of Duty: Modern Warfare 2. He eventually picked up Counter-Strike 1.6 again, but would only play surf maps and mods. Yip began playing Counter-Strike: Global Offensive in the summer of 2014 after a friend gifted him a copy. He was inspired by videos of Cloud9 and would play many hours of the day. He played matchmaking for 5 months before making the switch to ESEA. During this time, Yip was falsely accused of cheating by several players, further motivating him to pursue a professional CS:GO career.

== Career ==
Spontaneously flying to Los Angeles at the age of 17 kicked off the competitive career of a young "Stewie2K." Yip had garnered attention for his competitive PUG performances and heard rumors of a certain player's professional career soon coming to an end opening the door for Yip. He bided his time and waited for said player to relinquish his spot on the team. After Sean Gares announced he was leaving Cloud9, the team decided to pick up Yip with Gares' personal recommendation. Yip joined Cloud9 on January 11, 2016, as an In-Game Leader. He signed the Cloud9 contract a few hours after his 18th birthday. His addition was met with criticism from some veteran players.

Yip played for 2 years with Cloud9 and won several tournaments with the team including ESL Pro League Season 4, DreamHack Open Denver 2017 and iBUYPOWER Masters 2017. Yip won the ELEAGUE Major: Boston 2018 with Cloud9 after defeating FaZe clan in double overtime on map 3 of the grand final, the first and only major win for a North American roster. At the end of March, Yip left Cloud9 for SK Gaming. He tried out to replace Epitacio "TACO" de Melo's spot on SK Gaming's active lineup. After a three-month period, Made in Brazil (MIBR) signed the SK Gaming roster to play under MIBR's name.

MIBR traded Yip to Team Liquid for Epitácio "TACO" de Melo and head coach Wilton "zews" Prado in December 2018.

In December 2019, Yip became the first North American CS:GO player to earn over $1,000,000 in tournament prize money after finishing runner up to Astralis in the ECS Season 8 Finals. Yip would go on to win 7 total tournaments with Liquid in 2019. Team Liquid's CS:GO team earned $2.31 million in 2019. After being removed from Team Liquid's active roster in late 2021, Yip signed with Evil Geniuses in January 2022.

In July 2022, Yip announced he would be stepping away from competitive Counter-Strike to focus on streaming CS:GO and Valorant for the Evil Geniuses Creator Collective.

In May 2024, G2 Esports in-game leader, Rasmus "HooXi" Nielsen, was unavailable for IEM Dallas for personal reasons. To replace him, G2 recruited Yip as a stand-in. The event marked Yip's first LAN event in two years. G2 advanced to the final of IEM Dallas, achieving victories over MOUZ, Team Liquid, and FaZe Clan. In the final, G2 defeated Vitality 2-1, securing the championship.

== Notable achievements ==
Place	Date	Tournament	Team	Prize
1st	2024-06-02	IEM Dallas 2024	G2 Esports	$100,000
1st	2020-04-12	ESL Pro League Season 11 North America	Team Liquid	$90,000
1st	2019-07-21	Intel Extreme Masters XIV - Chicago	Team Liquid	$125,000
1st	2019-07-14	BLAST Pro Series Los Angeles 2019	Team Liquid	$125,000
1st	2019-07-07	Intel Grand Slam Season 2	Team Liquid	$1,000,000
1st	2019-07-07	ESL One Cologne 2019	Team Liquid	$125,000
1st	2019-06-23	ESL Pro League Season 9	Team Liquid	$250,000
1st	2019-06-02	DreamHack Masters Dallas 2019	Team Liquid	$100,000
1st	2019-05-05	IEM Sydney 2019	Team Liquid	$100,000
1st	2019-01-19	iBUYPOWER Masters 2019	Team Liquid	$100,000
1st	2018-08-26	ZOTAC Cup Masters 2018 Grand Finals	MIBR	$200,000
1st	2018-01-28	ELEAGUE Major: Boston 2018	Cloud9	$500,000
1st	2017-11-11	iBUYPOWER Masters 2017	Cloud9	$50,000
1st	2017-10-20	DreamHack Open Denver 2017	Cloud9	$50,000
1st	2016-10-30	ESL Pro League Season 4	Cloud9	$200,000
