= OJ Borg =

British radio, television, and esports presenter

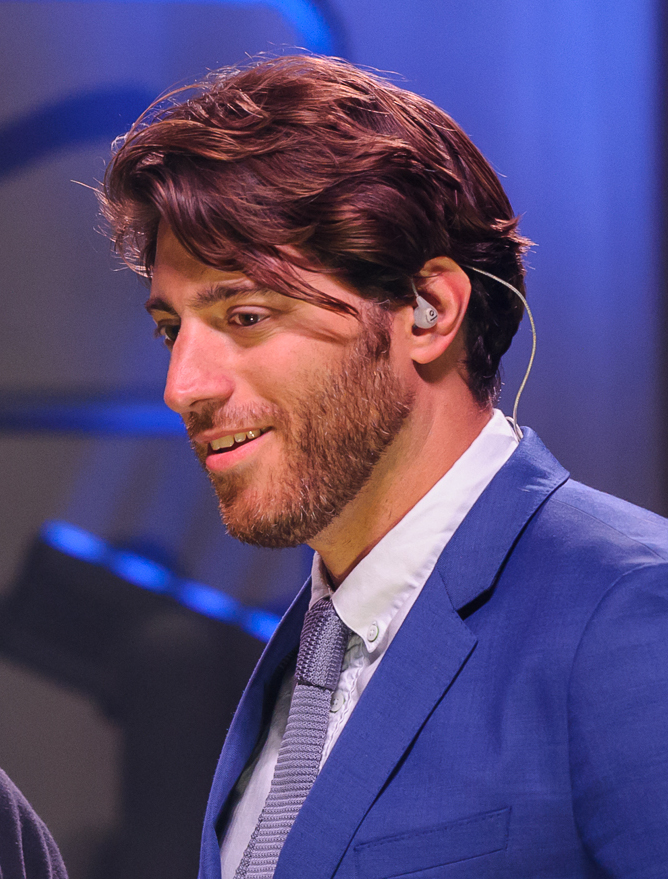
- Borg in 2015
- Born: Oliver James Borg D'Anastasi; Leicester, England
- Occupations: Broadcaster and presenter
- Years active: 2005-present
- Employer: BBC
- Children: 2

Oliver James Borg D'Anastasi (/bɔːrdʒ/), known as OJ Borg, is a British radio and television presenter employed by the BBC. He currently hosts the BBC Radio 2 weekday overnight show.

== Career ==
=== Radio ===
In his early career he co-hosted the breakfast show on 96.2 The Revolution. From 2016 to 2017, he presented Rock 'n' Roll Football on Absolute Radio. For two years he was the presenter of The Hometime show on Key 103, and before that co-hosted the drivetime programme on Kerrang Radio with Kate Lawler. Borg presented The Saturday Breakfast Show on Xfm South Wales.

Since May 2018, Borg has presented BBC Radio 2's Tuesday to Friday midnight–3 am overnight programme. He also regularly deputises for Sara Cox, Scott Mills, Rylan Clark, and Craig Charles. When Steve Wright was replaced by Mills in 2022, Borg covered the Afternoon Show from 2 to 5 pm for several weeks between the two presenters.

Borg has presented BBC Radio 5 Live's cycling show BeSpoke, regularly attending and reporting from events such as the Tour de France.

Borg also co-owns the production company MegaCityDigital, through which he produces and hosts a cycling and mixed martial arts podcasts for the BBC. He directed and presented 100 Things to Do on Your Bike for the Bike Channel and produced social media content for the Esports awards.

=== Television ===
In 2005, Borg began his TV career hosting a daily live show on VH1 – Radio Gaga – with Absolute Radio's Sarah Champion. While working for MTV networks he also presented the Rewind and Ultimate charts, the film show Screen, and fronted guides to the Oxegen Festival in Ireland and the clubs of Ibiza. He also presented TMF Kicks, working first with Carole Machin, then Kate Edmondson.

For three years, Borg was a regular presenter of the National Lottery and EuroMillions programmes on BBC One.

On 12 September 2007, Borg, along with Lynsey Horn, launched the new Freeview channel Nuts TV, presenting the weeknight live shows along with game show North vs South. During this time he also presented with Chanelle Hayes and Lucy Pinder.

Borg was a continuity voice on newly branded channel Fiver, and took part in The Bullrun, a Gumball 3000 style rally across the United States which was documented for Channel 4 and Nuts TV.

Borg has a keen interest in MMA and was the post-fight interviewer for BAMMA broadcasting live on Channel 5. He also previously hosted the monthly magazine show UFC Fighting Talk on BT Sport.

On 27 December 2011, he appeared on Celebrity Mastermind on BBC One. Taking Star Wars as his specialist subject (and dressed as Princess Leia), he finished third with 21 points. On 22 December 2023, he again appeared on Celebrity Mastermind. His specialist subject this time was Wayne’s World, he finished first with 16 points.

From October 2020, Borg has presented World of Zwift, a weekly round-up of what's going on in Zwift racing.

In 2024, Borg competed on Celebrity MasterChef on BBC One, where he finished in 10th place.

== Esports ==
Borg works with ESL at ESL One Cologne 2015 and ESL One Cologne 2019 as Stage host, as well as multiple other ESL and IEM events. He has also worked with ESL for the Call of Duty World League, where he hosted events in the European region.
