= Anders Blume =

Danish esports commentator

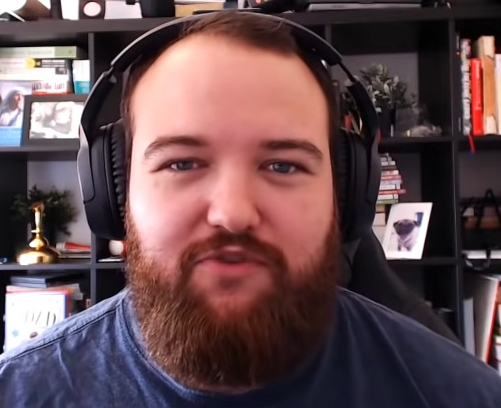
- Anders Blume in 2018
- Born: December 7, 1985 (age 40); Denmark
- Occupation: Counter-Strike: Global Offensive commentator
- Years active: 2013–present

Anders Blume (born December 7, 1985) is a Danish Counter-Strike commentator and co-founder of RoomOnFire. He has worked for a variety of tournament organizers including Electronic Sports League (ESL), DreamHack and Gfinity. He has worked frequently with fellow RoomOnFire co-founders Auguste 'Semmler' Massonnat and Jason "Moses" O'Toole. In 2015, he won the Golden Joystick award.

== Career ==
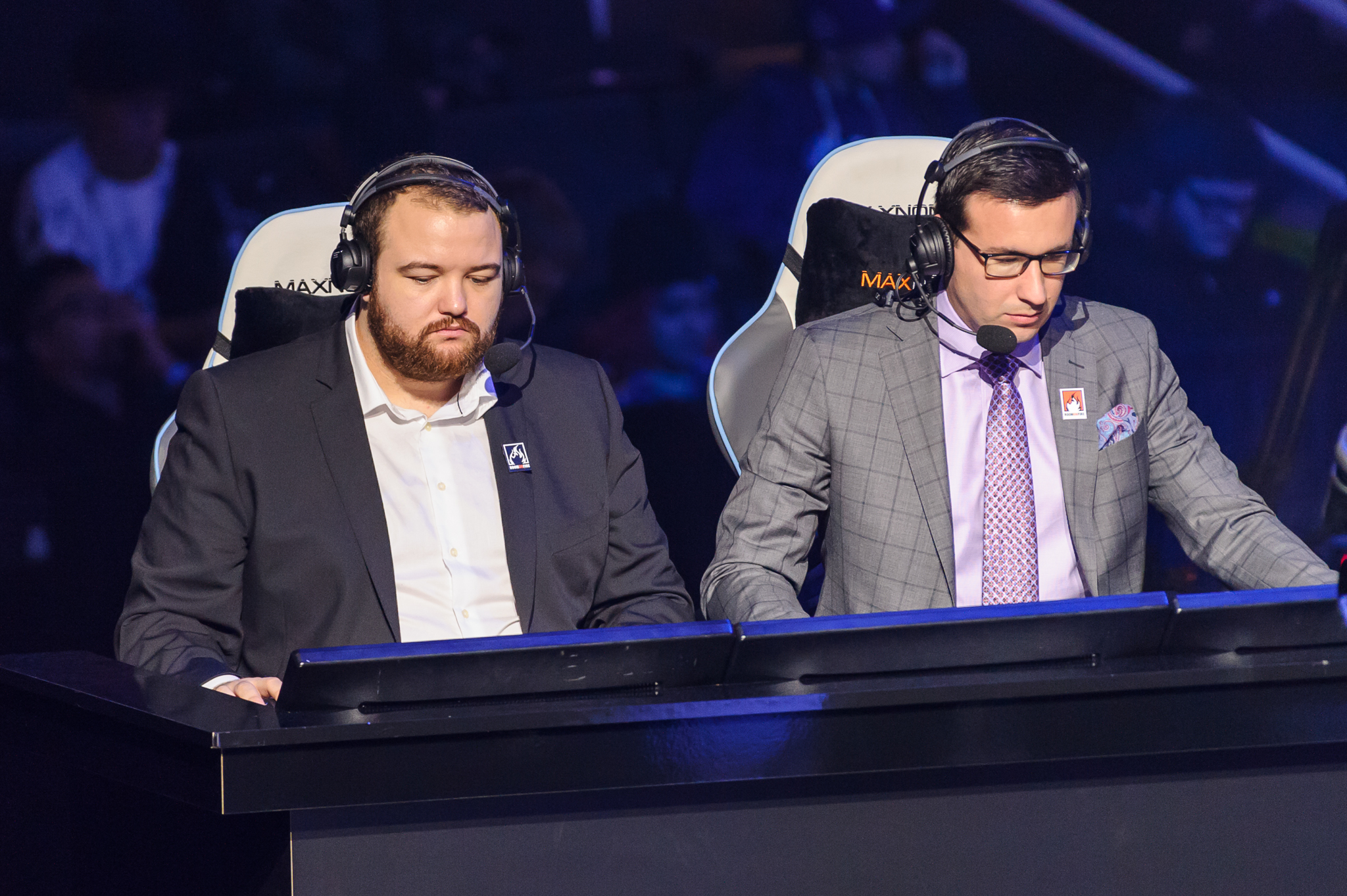
Blume (left) at IEM San Jose 2015

Blume stated an early motivating factor for his involvement in commentating was dissatisfaction with the level of analysis provided by existing Counter-Strike commentators.

Blume's first live-streamed cast was in January 2013 on a Twitch channel called pugcasts. He later joined NiPTV, part of Ninjas in Pyjamas (NIP). His first major appearance as a commentator was at DreamHack Summer 2013.

=== RoomOnFire ===
In July 2014, Anders officially left NiPTV to build his own brand, RoomOnFire, alongside Massonat. Initially, the only other member of the organization was Halvor "vENdetta" Gulestøl. In the beginning they ran their own weekly online cups, CaseKing of the Hill. These cups ran weekly featuring a variety of different top teams. The series of cups culminated with an eight team online invitational tournament called the Caseking King of Kings.

RoomOnFire signed an exclusivity deal with Twitch in April 2015 as part of a larger acquisition of talent.

In 2019, Blume and others alleged mistreatment by the NIP organisation.

=== Notable Events ===
- DreamHack Summer 2013
- DreamHack Winter 2013
- ESL One Katowice 2014
- ESL One Cologne 2014
- DreamHack Winter 2014
- ESL One Katowice 2015
- DreamHack Open Tour 2015
- ESL One Cologne 2015
- DreamHack Open Cluj-Napoca 2015
- MLG Columbus 2016
- ESL One Cologne 2016
- ELEAGUE Major 2017
- PGL Major: Kraków 2017
- ELEAGUE Major: Boston 2018
- FACEIT Major: London 2018
- ESL One Cologne 2019
- StarLadder Major: Berlin 2019
- Intel Extreme Masters (IEM) Katowice 2020
- BLAST Premier Global Final 2020
- PGL Major Stockholm 2021
- BLAST Premier Fall Final 2021
- IEM Cologne 2022

=== Reputation ===
Blume's prevalence in Counter-Strike commentary has led him to be referred to as the voice of Counter-Strike: Global Offensive. Blume has drawn particular attention for his deliverance of the phrase "Are you kidding me!".

In 2015, Blume won the Golden Joystick award for esports icon. In 2018, Blume was nominated for Best Esports Host by The Game Awards, losing to Sjokz.

=== Criticism ===
Early in his career, Blume received criticism "for not living up to the high standards set by Counter-Strike stalwarts Joe Miller and Paul Chaloner".

== Personal life ==
Blume is married and has a son and a daughter. He attended the University of Copenhagen to study Physics before transferring to Biology and then English but he did not graduate citing indecision around his education as a factor that lead him to commentating.

=== Early life ===
Blume lived in Farum for some time during his childhood. There, he played Counter-Strike with his friends at internet cafes.
