= ESL One Cologne 2019 =

- 2019

Tournament information
- Sport: Counter-Strike: Global Offensive
- Location: Cologne, Germany
- Dates: July 2, 2019–July 7, 2019
- Administrator: Electronic Sports League (ESL)
- Tournament format(s): Double elimination group stage Six team single-elimination playoff
- Venue: Lanxess Arena
- Teams: 16 teams
- Purse: US$300,000

Final positions
- Champions: Team Liquid
- 1st runners-up: Team Vitality
- 2nd runners-up: Astralis Natus Vincere

Tournament statistics
- Attendance: 15,000
- MVP: Mathieu "ZywOo" Herbaut

ESL One Cologne 2019 is a Counter-Strike: Global Offensive tournament run by ESL. In July 2019, sixteen teams from around the globe competed in an offline (LAN) tournament that featured a group stage and playoffs with a US$300,000 prize pool. This event and Intel Extreme Masters Season XIV - Chicago were the last events before teams playing at StarLadder Major: Berlin 2019 took a month break before heading to the Major.

This tournament is the fifth tournament of the second season of the Intel Grand Slam, which a list of international premier tournaments run by ESL and DreamHack. Each team gets ten tournaments that it participates in to have a chance at winning four of them. The first team to win four titles earns an extra $1,000,000. With Team Liquid doing so and securing a 4th premier win, they received an extra $1,000,000 for their win against Team Vitality in the grand final.

== Format ==
ESL invited eleven teams to compete in the tournament. Two teams from Europe, one team from North America, one team from Asia, and the winner of the GG.Bet Invitational tournament competed for the last five spots. The matches are broadcast-ed live on YouTube.

There are two stages for Cologne 2019, including a group stage and a playoffs. The group stage will feature two groups of eight teams, each seeded according to the ESL World Rankings. The initial matches will be a best of one and all further matches will be a best of three. The format will be an eight team, double elimination bracket, with the top three teams going through. The winner of the groups will be given a bye for the playoffs. The playoffs will feature six teams. The winners of the groups will head straight to the semifinals while the other four teams will play in the quarterfinals. Teams will play until a winner is decided. The quarterfinals and semifinals will be a best of three and the finals will be a best of five.

=== Map pool ===
The event used Valve's Active Duty map pool. Cache was taken out of the map pool as Valve announced it would be undergoing renovations. Rather than debuting a new Cobblestone, which is normally in the map pool, Valve introduced Vertigo for the first time as part of its competitive map pool.

- Dust II
- Mirage
- Inferno
- Nuke
- Train
- Overpass
- Vertigo

== Broadcast Talent ==
The broadcast talent was announced on June 25, 2019.

Desk host

- Alex "Machine" Richardson

Stage host

- Oliver James "OJ Borg" Borg

Interviewer

- Tres "stunna" Saranthus

Analysts

- Chad "SPUNJ" Burchill
- Janko "YNk" Paunović
- Duncan "Thorin" Shields

Commentators

- Anders Blume
- Henry "HenryG" Greer
- Jason "moses" O'Toole
- Matthew "Sadokist" Trivett

Observers

- Jake "Jak3y" Elton
- Alex "Rushly" Rush

== Qualifiers ==
=== European qualifier ===
Two teams from the European qualifier moved on to the main event in Germany. Three teams were invited, one team qualified from winning ESL Meisterschaft: Spring 2019, and four teams qualified from two open qualifiers.

Team Vitality was the favorite all the way and proved so by taking down every team through the winner's side of the bracket. North or HellRaisers were favorites to be the second team to move on, but both teams stumbled on Heroic and AVANGAR. Heroic swept AVANGAR in the loser's final to be the second team to book a ticket to Cologne.

EU Cologne 2019 Qualifier

Upper round 1	Upper round 2	Upper final
Team Vitality	2
Alternate aTTaX	0
Team Vitality	2
AVANGAR	0
OpTic Gaming	1
AVANGAR	2
Team Vitality	2
Heroic	1
HellRaisers	1
Heroic	2
Heroic	2
North	1
Chaos Esports Club	0
North	2
Lower round 1	Lower round 2	Lower round 3	Lower final
North	2
Alternate aTTax	0	OpTic Gaming	0	Heroic	2
OpTic Gaming	2	North	0	AVANGAR	0
AVANGAR	2
AVANGAR	2
HellRaisers	2	HellRaisers	0
Chaos Esports Club	1

=== North American qualifier ===
One team from the North American qualifier was given a ticket to Cologne. Four teams were invited and another four teams qualified from two different open qualifiers.

North America's qualifier was a toss-up as there were several teams with potential. FURIA Esports fell very early in an upset loss to the newly formed Lazarus Esports roster and compLexity Gaming fell to Lazarus in the next round. Ghost Gaming, also a favorite, defeated Lazarus and awaited its opponent. FURIA made a big run from the loser's side, defeating Bad News Bears, Team Envy, compLexity, and Lazarus to face off against Ghost. Despite Ghost given the 1-0 default lead via coming from the winner's side, FURIA had a relatively easy time and stole the spot away from Ghost.

NA Cologne 2019 Qualifier

Upper round 1	Upper round 2	Upper final
Ghost Gaming	2
ATK	1
Ghost Gaming	2
Team Envy	0
INTZ eSports	1
Team Envy	2
Ghost Gaming	2
Lazarus Esports	1
Lazarus Esports	2
FURIA Esports	1
Lazarus Esports	2
compLexity Gaming	1
Bad News Bears	0
compLexity Gaming	2
Lower round 1	Lower round 2	Lower round 3	Lower final
compLexity Gaming	2
ATK	2	ATK	1	Lazarus Esports	0
INTZ eSports	0	compLexity Gaming	0	FURIA Esports	2
FURIA Esports	2
Team Envy	0
FURIA Esports	2	FURIA Esports	2
Bad News Bears	1

=== Asian qualifier ===
One team from the Asian qualifier qualified for a potential meeting at the Lanxess Arena. Four teams were invited and another four teams qualified from two different open qualifiers.

TyLoo was the favorite, despite its recent inconsistencies, and ViCi Gaming's hot rise put them as another favorite. However, both Chinese teams fell as ViCi was edged out by B.O.O.T-dream[S]cape (B.O.O.T-d[S]) of Singapore and TyLoo was taken down by MVP PK of South Korea. MVP PK swept B.O.O.T-d[S] to book a spot in the finals. TyLoo stormed through the loser's side of the bracket, only to be stumped by MVP PK once again, allowing the Koreans to attend just their second premier tournament of the year.

Asia Cologne 2019 Qualifier

Upper round 1	Upper round 2	Upper final
ViCi Gaming	2
Big Time Regal	0
ViCi Gaming	1
B.O.O.T-d[S]	2
ALPHA Red	0
B.O.O.T-d[S]	2
B.O.O.T-[S]	0
MVP PK	2
MVP PK	2
Recca Esports	0
MVP PK	2
TyLoo	1
TyLoo	2
EHOME	0
Lower round 1	Lower round 2	Lower round 3	Lower final
TyLoo	2
Big Time Regal	0	Alpha Red	0	B.O.O.T-d[S]	0
ALPHA Red	2	TyLoo	2	TyLoo	2
EHOME	0
ViCi Gaming	1
Recca Esports	0	EHOME	2
EHOME	2

=== GG.BET Invitational ===
Like the last Cologne qualifier, this invitational determined the final team of the lineup. Seven teams were invited and Team Spirit qualified from a 186 team open qualifier.

As the top ranked team in the world, Team Liquid was the favorite to come out on top while G2 Esports was the favorite to win out its group. However, both teams suffered upsets, with Liquid losing to Spirit and G2 losing to forZe. Both teams bounced back and met in the finals, where Liquid swept G2 to take the last spot at Cologne.

GG.Bet Cologne 2019 Invitational Qualifier
Group A

Pos	Team	W	L	RF	RA	RD	Pts
1	Sprout	2	0	48	24	+24	6
2	Team Liquid	2	1	81	45	+36	6
3	Team Spirit	1	2	47	81	-34	3
4	NoChance	0	2	22	48	-26	0

Group B

Pos	Team	W	L	RF	RA	RD	Pts
1	forZe	2	0	60	41	+19	6
2	G2 Esports	2	1	92	84	+8	6
3	HellRaisers	1	2	88	111	-23	3
4	Movistar Riders	0	2	68	72	-4	0

Semifinals
Sprout	0
G2 Esports	2
forZe	1
Team Liquid	2

Finals
G2 Esports	0
Team Liquid	2

== Teams competing ==
=== Invited ===
- Astralis
- BIG
- ENCE eSports
- FaZe Clan
- Fnatic
- MIBR
- mousesports
- Natus Vincere
- Ninjas in Pyjamas
- NRG Esports
- Renegades

=== Qualifiers ===
- Team Vitality (Europe)
- Heroic (Europe)
- FURIA Esports (North America)
- MVP PK (Asia)
- Team Liquid (GG.Bet Invitational)

== Group stage ==
The format of the group stage was two groups of eight teams in a double elimination bracket. The teams to win their brackets moved on to the semifinals while the next two teams were in the quarterfinals.

=== Group A ===
==== Bracket ====
Winner's Quarterfinals
1	Team Liquid	1
8	MVP PK	0
4	Natus Vincere	1
5	mousesports	0
3	FaZe Clan	1
6	Renegades	0
2	NRG Esports	1
7	FURIA Esports	0
Loser's Eighths
8	MVP PK	0
5	mousesports	2
6	Renegades	0
7	FURIA Esports	2

Winner's Semifinals
1	Team Liquid	2
4	Natus Vincere	1
3	FaZe Clan	0
2	NRG Esports	2
Loser's Quarterfinals
3	FaZe Clan	0
5	mousesports	2
4	Natus Vincere	2
7	FURIA Esports	0

Winner's Finals
1	Team Liquid	2
2	NRG Esports	0
Playoff Qualifier
5	mousesports	1
4	Natus Vincere	2

Team Liquid kicked off ESL One Cologne 2019 against MVP PK. Liquid was the heavy favorite, but it turned out inexperience on the big stage helped out the Koreans as they completely stumped Liquid at times. However, the North Americans pulled through and just about won the match. The simultaneous match also was a thriller as mousesports took a huge 11–4 lead. However, led by Oleksandr "s1mple" Kostyliev's 32 kills, Natus Vincere (Na`Vi) pulled a massive comeback to take the game 16–14. Renegades took a 9-6 halftime lead, but this game also was incredibly close. FaZe went on to take a 14–12 lead, Renegades tied it up, but FaZe took the last two rounds to squeeze past the Australians. FURIA Esports was the team that ended Astralis's Nuke win streak, but NRG came prepared on the same map, as it took a 13–2 lead and closed out the game with relative ease. With Na`Vi up 15–11, the CIS team looked to take the first map against Liquid. However, s1mple got greedy with his team in a 3 vs.1 man advantage against Liquid's captain Nicholas "nitr0" Cannella and went for a knife, but instead nitr0 went on to clutch the round. This would prove to be disastrous as Na`Vi lost the map in double overtime. Na`Vi took the next map in close fashion, but Liquid clinched a playoff berth in the third map. In two relatively close maps, NRG knocked FaZe to the lower bracket behind Vincent "Brehze" Cayonte's 47 kills. On the loser's side, MVP PK looked to surprise, but mousesports but an end to it as it easily eliminated the Koreans. FURIA advanced with a sweep against the Renegades with Andrei "arT" Piovezan raking a massive 58 kills. Finn "karrigan" Andersen continued to find success against his old team as mousesports took down FaZe after a close first map and a dominant second map. FURIA looked to have another Cinderella run as it did in Esports Championship Series Season 7, but Na`Vi put an end to that after two very close maps. The two North American teams had a hard-battled winner's finals, but Liquid clutched it out after a back and forth first map and a double overtime second map. In the last group A match, Na`Vi took the first map over mousesports in another double overtime game. mousesports responded with a win on Dust II, but s1mple's 26 kills and Denis "electronic" Sharipov's 23 overran mousesports.

Group A Results

Group A matches
Team	Score	Map	Score	Team
Team Liquid	16	Nuke	14	MVP PK
Natus Vincere	16	Train	14	mousesports
FaZe Clan	16	Mirage	14	Renegades
NRG Esports	16	Nuke	7	FURIA Esports
Team Liquid	22	Dust II	19	Natus Vincere
Team Liquid	14	Overpass	16	Natus Vincere
Team Liquid	16	Mirage	8	Natus Vincere
FaZe Clan	11	Mirage	16	NRG Esports
FaZe Clan	11	Overpass	16	NRG Esports
FaZe Clan	–	Dust II	–	NRG Esports
MVP PK	8	Vertigo	16	mousesports
MVP PK	6	Inferno	16	mousesports
MVP PK	–	Nuke	–	mousesports
Renegades	9	Nuke	16	FURIA Esports
Renegades	9	Mirage	16	FURIA Esports
Renegades	–	Inferno	–	FURIA Esports
FaZe Clan	15	Inferno	19	mousesports
FaZe Clan	8	Mirage	16	mousesports
FaZe Clan	–	Nuke	–	mousesports
Natus Vincere	16	Nuke	12	FURIA Esports
Natus Vincere	16	Overpass	12	FURIA Esports
Natus Vincere	–	Inferno	–	FURIA Esports
Team Liquid	16	Nuke	12	NRG Esports
Team Liquid	22	Inferno	20	NRG Esports
Team Liquid	–	Dust II	–	NRG Esports
mousesports	19	Inferno	22	Natus Vincere
mousesports	16	Dust II	8	Natus Vincere
mousesports	9	Train	16	Natus Vincere

=== Group B ===
==== Bracket ====
Winner's Quarterfinals
1	Astralis	1
8	BIG	0
4	Fnatic	1
5	MIBR	0
3	Team Vitality	0
6	Ninjas in Pyjamas	1
2	ENCE eSports	0
7	Heroic	1
Loser's Eighths
8	BIG	2
5	MIBR	1
3	Team Vitality	2
2	ENCE Esports	1

Winner's Semifinals
1	Astralis	2
4	Fnatic	0
6	Ninjas in Pyjamas	2
7	Heroic	0
Loser's Quarterfinals
7	Heroic	2
8	BIG	0
4	Fnatic	0
3	Team Vitality	2

Winner's Finals
1	Astralis	2
6	Ninjas in Pyjamas	0
Playoff Qualifier
7	Heroic	0
3	Team Vitality	2

Astralis lead off group B with a dominant 16–4 win over BIG. MIBR's struggles continued despite bringing in Lucas "LUCAS1" Teles from Luminosity Gaming as Fnatic's 12–3 lead proved to be too much. Ninjas in Pyjamas (NiP) pulled off an upset against the red hot Team Vitality while Heroic also pulled off an upset against the Major runner-ups ENCE eSports. Astralis had no problem holding off Fnatic as the Danes did not allow the Swedes to get a second half round in either map. NiP booked a playoff spot as its second half performances held Heroic to just one round in each map. MIBR seemed to reach a low point after splitting the first two maps against BIG and then blowing a 12–3 lead and losing in overtime on the third map and the two time Cologne champions were eliminated in last place. ENCE also suffered from disappointment as it could not figure out the firepower of Mathieu "ZywOo" Herbaut and the tactics of Nathan "NBK-" Schmitt. Heroic was able to knock out BIG from the tournament, resulting in Fatih "gob b" Dayik and his team not able to appear in front of its home crowd. Vitality and Fnatic had a very close set as the two games in the series went into overtime. In the end, Vitality held on for both maps. NiP gave Astralis a bit of trouble, but the Danes were able to regain form and took the top seed in group B. On the loser's side, the inconsistent Heroic gave Vitality a run for its money, but the French were able to hang on to head to the Lanxess Arena.

Group B Results

Group B matches
Team	Score	Map	Score	Team
Astralis	16	Overpass	4	BIG
Fnatic	16	Inferno	11	MIBR
Team Vitality	10	Dust II	16	Ninjas in Pyjamas
ENCE eSports	10	Mirage	16	Heroic
Astralis	16	Fnatic	1	Fnatic
Astralis	16	Nuke	6	Fnatic
Astralis	–	Inferno	–	Fnatic
Ninjas in Pyjamas	16	Overpass	5	Heroic
Ninjas in Pyjamas	16	Inferno	10	Heroic
Ninjas in Pyjamas	–	Mirage	–	Heroic
BIG	16	Dust II	11	MIBR
BIG	7	Overpass	16	MIBR
BIG	19	Train	16	MIBR
Team Vitality	16	Overpass	9	ENCE eSports
Team Vitality	12	Nuke	16	ENCE eSports
Team Vitality	16	Inferno	9	ENCE eSports
Heroic	16	Inferno	13	BIG
Heroic	16	Nuke	7	BIG
Heroic	–	Overpass	–	BIG
Fnatic	16	Mirage	19	Team Vitality
Fnatic	17	Overpass	19	Team Vitality
Fnatic	–	Inferno	–	Team Vitality
Astralis	19	Dust II	16	Ninjas in Pyjamas
Astralis	16	Inferno	8	Ninjas in Pyjamas
Astralis	–	Overpass	–	Ninjas in Pyjamas
Heroic	13	Overpass	16	Team Vitality
Heroic	14	Inferno	16	Team Vitality
Heroic	–	Nuke	–	Team Vitality

== Playoffs ==
The two runner-ups from each group each faced off in the quarterfinals. The top seeds in each group earned automatic berths to the playoffs. The quarterfinals and semifinals was best of three matches and the finals was a best of five.

Quarterfinals
B2	Ninjas in Pyjamas	0
A3	Natus Vincere	2
A2	NRG Esports	0
B3	Team Vitality	2

Semifinals
A1	Team Liquid	2
A3	Natus Vincere	0
B1	Astralis	1
B3	Team Vitality	2

Grand Finals
A1	Team Liquid	3
B3	Team Vitality	1

== Final standings ==
Team Liquid nitr0, EliGE, Twistzz, NAF, Stewie2K won the final game against Team Vitality and won the tournament and secured the prize money.

The final standings are shown below. Each team's in-game leader is shown first.

Place	Prize Money	Team	Roster	Coach
1st	US$125,000	Team Liquid	nitr0, EliGE, Twistzz, NAF, Stewie2K	adreN
2nd	US$50,000	Team Vitality	NBK-, apEx, RpK, ZywOo, ALEX	XTQZZZ
3rd – 4th	US$22,000	Natus Vincere	Flamie, s1mple, Zeus, Electronic, Boombl4	Kane
3rd – 4th	US$22,000	Astralis	dev1ce, dupreeh, Xyp9x, Gla1ve, Magisk	Zonic
5th–6th	US$11,000	Ninjas in Pyjamas	f0rest, GeT RiGhT, REZ, Plopski, Lekr0	pita
5th–6th	US$11,000	NRG	Brehze, CeRq, Ethan, Tarik, stanislaw	imAPet
7th–8th	US$7,500	Heroic	blameF, es3tag, NaToSaphiX, stavn, friberg	
7th–8th	US$7,500	mousesports	karrigan, chrisJ, frozen, ropz, woxic	Rejin
9th–12th	US$6,000	BIG	gob b, denis, tabseN, tiziaN, XANTARES	LEGIJA
9th–12th	US$6,000	FaZe Clan	NiKo, GuardiaN, NEO, olofmeister, rain	YNk
9th–12th	US$6,000	Fnatic	Xizt, Brollan, JW, KRiMZ, twist	Jumpy
9th–12th	US$6,000	FURIA Esports	arT, ableJ, KSCERATO, VINI, yuurih	guierri
13th–16th	US$5,000	ENCE eSports	allu, Aerial, Aleksib, sergej, xseveN	Twista
13th–16th	US$5,000	MIBR	FalleN, coldzera, fer, LUCAS1, TACO	zews
13th–16th	US$5,000	MVP PK	HSK, stax, xeta, XigN, zeff	termi
13th–16th	US$5,000	Renegades	AZR, jks, Liazz, Gratisfaction, jkaem	kassad
