= ESL Pro League Season 9 =

2019 esports tournament

ESL Pro League
- 2019

Tournament information
- Sport: Counter-Strike: Global Offensive
- Location: Leicester, United Kingdom (Europe group stage); Burbank, California (Americas group stage); Montpellier, France (Finals)
- Dates: April 12, 2019–June 23, 2019
- Administrator: Electronic Sports League (ESL)
- Venue: ESL studios (Europe and America group stages); Montpellier Exhibition Center (Finals group stage); Sud de France Arena (Finals playoffs)
- Teams: 48 teams
- Purse: US$750,000

Final positions
- Champions: Team Liquid
- 1st runners-up: G2 Esports
- 2nd runners-up: mousesports NRG Esports
- MVP: Jonathan "EliGE" Jablonowski

ESL Pro League Season 9 (shortened as EPL Season 9) was a Counter-Strike: Global Offensive tournament run by ESL. It was the ninth season of the ESL Pro League. Teams from five continents – North America, Europe, Asia, Australia, and South America – competed in four leagues to attempt to qualify for the Finals. The regular season started on April 12, 2019, and ended in June 2019. This season was also the fourth tournament of the Intel Grand Slam Season 2. The EPL Finals took place in Montpellier, France.

The finals for ESL Pro League Season 9 featured G2 Esports, which defeated FaZe Clan and NRG Esports en route to the grand finals, and Team Liquid, which defeated Astralis and mousesports. The season concluded with Team Liquid defeating G2 Esports three games to one to earn its inaugural Pro League title. This is the inaugural that a North American team has won a premier title in Europe.

== Format ==
This season introduced a vastly different format than other seasons. Instead like last season, which had five leagues, there will only be four leagues: Europe, Americas, Asia, and Oceania.

Europe's league will feature sixteen teams, thirteen of which were automatically invited based on their top thirteen placement from last season. One team qualified by winning season 29 of Europe's Premier Division and another two teams qualified through the relegation phase. The Americas league also had sixteen teams, but instead of just teams based in North America, it will also feature Latin American teams. This league will feature the top nine teams from North America's season 8, the winner of season 29 of North America's Premier Division, and two teams from the relegation phase; there will also be four Latin American teams. Asia's league will feature four teams from the Greater China area and four teams from Southeast Asia. Oceania's league will feature eight teams. Both Asia and Oceania's regular seasons will remain online.

The biggest change came with Europe's and the America's leagues featuring offline regular season play. This format will be similar to a mix of the ELEAGUE Season 1 group stage and the ESL One Katowice 2015 group stage. Four teams at a time will fly out to an ESL studio and play their matches there. For all four leagues, teams will be divided into groups of four teams and play a best of three robin round. For Europe, there were four groups. The winners of each group automatically moved on to the Finals while the teams that placed second and third moved to a second group stage. Fourth place teams were eliminated. In the second group stage, there were two groups of four teams. The top two teams in each group qualified for the finals. For the Americas, the first group stage was the same, but for the second group stage, only one team from each group moved on to the Finals. For Asia and Oceania, there were two groups in the first stage. The top two teams moved on to the second stage. There, only one team from each region qualified for the Finals in France.

== Qualifiers ==
=== Season 8 Relegation ===
==== Europe Relegation ====
Due to Europe's league expanding to sixteen teams, Ninjas in Pyjamas and Fnatic were automatically invited to this season rather than playing in this relegation phase and AGO Esports played in the relegation phase instead of being automatically sent down to the Premier Division. In addition, Epsilon eSports was unable to play in relegation, so OpTic, which had the best record in Premier, took its place.

Season 8 Relegation

- AGO Esports (Season 8 #14)
- Virtus.pro (ESEA Season 29 #2)
- Team Kinguin (ESEA Season 29 #3)
- OpTic Gaming (ESEA Season 29 #5-8)

Upper round 1
1 | AGO Esports | 1
4 | OpTic Gaming | 2
2 | Virtus.pro | 2
3 | Team Kinguin | 0
Lower round 1
1 | AGO Esports | 0
3 | Team Kinguin | 2

Upper final
4 | OpTic Gaming | 2
2 | Virtus.pro | 0
Lower final
2 | Virtus.pro | 1
3 | Team Kinguin | 2

Qualified
4 | OpTic Gaming
3 | Team Kinguin

==== North America Relegation ====
Season 8 Relegation

- Rogue (Season 8 #10)
- Team Envy (Season 8 #11)
- cantwinalan (ESEA Season 29 #2)
- Team Singularity (ESEA Season 29 #3)

Upper round 1
1 | Rogue | 1
4 | Team Singul. | 2
2 | Team Envy | 2
3 | cantwinalan | 1
Lower round 1
1 | Rogue | 2
3 | cantwinalan | 0

Upper final
4 | Team Singularity | 1
2 | Team Envy | 2
Lower final
4 | Team Singularity | 0
1 | Rogue | 2

Qualified
2 | Team Envy
1 | Rogue

== Teams ==
=== Europe ===
- Astralis (Season 8 #1)
- Natus Vincere (Season 8 #2)
- BIG (Season 8 #3)
- North (Season 8 #4)
- HellRaisers (Season 8 #5)
- mousesports (Season 8 #6)
- G2 Esports (Season 8 #7)
- Windigo Gaming (Season 8 #8)
- ex-Space Soldiers (Season 8 #9)
- Heroic (Season 8 #10)
- FaZe Clan (Season 8 #11)
- Ninjas in Pyjamas (Season 8 #12)
- Fnatic (Season 8 #13)
- 3DMAX (ESEA Premier Season 29)
- OpTic Gaming (Season 8 Relegation)
- Aristocracy (Season 8 Relegation)

=== Americas ===
- MIBR (Season 8 #1)
- Ghost Gaming (Season 8 #2)
- Team Liquid (Season 8 #3)
- NRG Esports (Season 8 #4)
- Renegades (Season 8 #5)
- INTZ eSports (Season 8 #6)
- eUnited (Season 8 #7)
- Cloud9 (Season 8 #8)
- compLexity Gaming (Season 8 #9)
- Lazarus Esports (ESEA Premier Season 29)
- Team Envy (Season 8 Relegation)
- Luminosity Gaming (Invited) (Rogue disbands after StarSeries & i-League CS:GO Season 7. ESL announced the Luminosity Gaming would take its place.)
- Isurus Gaming (LA League Season 3 #1)
- Infinity Esports (LA League Season 3 #2)
- Denial Esports (Latin America North)
- DETONA Gaming (Latin America South)

=== Asia ===
- TyLoo (Invited)
- ViCi Gaming (Invited)
- MVP PK (East Asia #1)
- 5Power Gaming (East Asia #2)
- B.O.O.T-dream[S]cape (Southeast Asia #1-2)
- Lucid Dream (Southeast Asia #1-2)
- Alpha Red (Southeast Asia #3)
- Entity Gaming (India Premiership)

=== Oceania ===
- ORDER (ESEA Premier S30 #1)
- Chiefs Esports Club (ESEA Premier S30 #2)
- Grayhound Gaming (ESEA Premier S30 #3)
- Breakaway Esports (ESEA Premier S30 #4)
- Avant Gaming (ESEA Premier S30 #5)
- Paradox Gaming (ESEA Premier S30 #6)
- Ground Zero Gaming (ESEA Premier S30 #7)
- Athletico Esports (ESEA Premier S30 #8)

== Europe ==
=== Stage 1 ===
==== Group A ====
| Pos | Team | W | L | RF | RA | RD |
|---|---|---|---|---|---|---|
| 1 | mousesports | 3 | 0 | 100 | 55 | +45 |
| 2 | OpTic Gaming | 2 | 1 | 110 | 95 | +15 |
| 3 | North | 1 | 2 | 84 | 100 | –16 |
| 4 | ex-Space Soldiers | 0 | 3 | 52 | 96 | –44 |

Group A matches
| North | 1 | 2 | OpTic Gaming |
| mousesports | 2 | 0 | ex-Space Soldiers |
| mousesports | 2 | 1 | OpTic Gaming |
| North | 2 | 0 | ex-Space Soldiers |
| mousesports | 2 | 0 | North |
| OpTic Gaming | 2 | 0 | ex-Space Soldiers |

mousesports looked strong in its group stage matches, as it only dropped one map out of the six it played. OpTic Gaming also had a strong performance as it was the only team to take a map off of mousesports. North struggled throughout the group stage, but two close map wins against the former players of Space Soldiers allowed the Danes to stay alive. ex-Space Soldiers continued to struggle after leaving Space Soldiers, even under the leadership of veteran Turkish-Australian player Yaman "yam" Ergenekon.

Group A Results

| Team | Score | Map | Score | Team |
|---|---|---|---|---|
| North | 16 | Overpass | 19 | OpTic Gaming |
| North | 16 | Train | 9 | OpTic Gaming |
| North | 11 | Nuke | 16 | OpTic Gaming |
| mousesports | 16 | Inferno | 2 | ex-Space Soldiers |
| mousesports | 16 | Train | 10 | ex-Space Soldiers |
| mousesports | – | Mirage | – | ex-Space Soldiers |
| mousesports | 16 | Overpass | 7 | OpTic Gaming |
| mousesports | 4 | Dust II | 16 | OpTic Gaming |
| mousesports | 16 | Train | 11 | OpTic Gaming |
| North | 16 | Dust II | 13 | ex-Space Soldiers |
| North | 16 | Train | 11 | ex-Space Soldiers |
| North | – | Inferno | – | ex-Space Soldiers |
| mousesports | 16 | Train | 4 | North |
| mousesports | 16 | Mirage | 5 | North |
| mousesports | – | Inferno | – | North |
| OpTic Gaming | 16 | Mirage | 6 | ex-Space Soldiers |
| OpTic Gaming | 16 | Overpass | 10 | ex-Space Soldiers |
| OpTic Gaming | – | Inferno | – | ex-Space Soldiers |

==== Group B ====
| Pos | Team | W | L | RF | RA | RD |
|---|---|---|---|---|---|---|
| 1 | FaZe Clan | 3 | 0 | 107 | 60 | +47 |
| 2 | Heroic (Note: Heroic was awarded the second seed by virtue of winning more maps than Ninjas in Pyjamas or devils.one. devils.one was given the third seed by virtue of defeating Ninjas in Pyjamas.) | 1 | 2 | 124 | 139 | –15 |
| 3 | devils.one | 1 | 2 | 102 | 130 | –28 |
| 4 | Ninjas in Pyjamas | 1 | 2 | 113 | 117 | –4 |

Notes

Group B matches
| FaZe Clan | 2 | 1 | devils.one |
| Ninjas in Pyjamas | 2 | 1 | Heroic |
| FaZe Clan | 2 | 1 | Heroic |
| Ninjas in Pyjamas | 1 | 2 | devils.one |
| FaZe Clan | 2 | 0 | Ninjas in Pyjamas |
| Heroic | 2 | 1 | devils.one |

FaZe Clan was clearly the strongest team is it had almost no problem sweeping up the competition. Heroic, devils.one, and Ninjas in Pyjamas were all in a deadlock, each winning only one series. The very close loss to devils.one would come back to haunt Ninjas in Pyjamas as the Swedes were placed last in the group as Heroic and devils.one beat out the tiebreaker. Heroic defeating devils.one in a nail-biter, double overtime third map allowed the Danes to escape with the second seed; had Heroic lost to devils.one, it would have been in last place.

Group B Results

| Team | Score | Map | Score | Team |
|---|---|---|---|---|
| FaZe Clan | 16 | Train | 4 | devils.one |
| FaZe Clan | 16 | Dust II | 6 | devils.one |
| FaZe Clan | – | Overpass | – | devils.one |
| Ninjas in Pyjamas | 16 | Nuke | 11 | Heroic |
| Ninjas in Pyjamas | 17 | Train | 19 | Heroic |
| Ninjas in Pyjamas | 16 | Mirage | 10 | Heroic |
| FaZe Clan | 16 | Overpass | 8 | Heroic |
| FaZe Clan | 11 | Dust II | 16 | Heroic |
| FaZe Clan | 16 | Mirage | 11 | Heroic |
| Ninjas in Pyjamas | 13 | Mirage | 16 | devils.one |
| Ninjas in Pyjamas | 16 | Overpass | 10 | devils.one |
| Ninjas in Pyjamas | 17 | Nuke | 19 | devils.one |
| FaZe Clan | 16 | Mirage | 14 | Ninjas in Pyjamas |
| FaZe Clan | 16 | Dust II | 4 | Ninjas in Pyjamas |
| FaZe Clan | – | Overpass | – | Ninjas in Pyjamas |
| Heroic | 14 | Train | 16 | devils.one |
| Heroic | 16 | Overpass | 13 | devils.one |
| Heroic | 22 | Nuke | 18 | devils.one |

==== Group C ====
| Pos | Team | W | L | RF | RA | RD |
|---|---|---|---|---|---|---|
| 1 | G2 Esports | 3 | 0 | 130 | 106 | 24 |
| 2 | Natus Vincere | 2 | 1 | 131 | 131 | 0 |
| 3 | Fnatic | 1 | 2 | 113 | 113 | 0 |
| 4 | Windigo Gaming | 0 | 3 | 125 | 149 | –4 |

Group C matches
| Natus Vincere | 2 | 1 | Windigo Gaming |
| Fnatic | 0 | 2 | G2 Esports |
| Natus Vincere | 1 | 2 | G2 Esports |
| Fnatic | 2 | 1 | Windigo Gaming |
| Natus Vincere | 2 | 1 | Fnatic |
| G2 Esports | 2 | 1 | Windigo Gaming |

G2 Esports continued to look for a consistent, winning pattern, and it did so in this group, as it took down Natus Vincere (Na`Vi) and Fnatic to top group C. Na`Vi was not shaken up by the G2 loss as it went on to take down Fnatic. Fnatic, arguably the most decorated team in CS:GO, struggled, but defeating Windigo Gaming allowed the Swedes to stay alive. Windigo had strong performances prior, but the Bulgarians struggled to take the game to the finish line, as four of its losses were within four rounds of victory.

Group C Results

| Team | Score | Map | Score | Team |
|---|---|---|---|---|
| Natus Vincere | 20 | Overpass | 22 | Windigo Gaming |
| Natus Vincere | 16 | Train | 12 | Windigo Gaming |
| Natus Vincere | 16 | Dust II | 14 | Windigo Gaming |
| Fnatic | 11 | Nuke | 16 | G2 Esports |
| Fnatic | 17 | Inferno | 19 | G2 Esports |
| Fnatic | – | Train | – | G2 Esports |
| Natus Vincere | 14 | Nuke | 16 | G2 Esports |
| Natus Vincere | 16 | Train | 11 | G2 Esports |
| Natus Vincere | 9 | Overpass | 16 | G2 Esports |
| Fnatic | 16 | Train | 10 | Windigo Gaming |
| Fnatic | 13 | Mirage | 16 | Windigo Gaming |
| Fnatic | 16 | Nuke | 12 | Windigo Gaming |
| Natus Vincere | 16 | Nuke | 11 | Fnatic |
| Natus Vincere | 8 | Overpass | 16 | Fnatic |
| Natus Vincere | 16 | Inferno | 13 | Fnatic |
| G2 Esports | 20 | Train | 22 | Windigo Gaming |
| G2 Esports | 16 | Dust II | 13 | Windigo Gaming |
| G2 Esports | 16 | Inferno | 4 | Windigo Gaming |

==== Group D ====
| Pos | Team | W | L | RF | RA | RD |
|---|---|---|---|---|---|---|
| 1 | Astralis | 3 | 0 | 113 | 67 | +46 |
| 2 | HellRaisers | 2 | 1 | 84 | 80 | +4 |
| 3 | BIG | 1 | 2 | 107 | 113 | –6 |
| 4 | ex-3DMAX | 0 | 3 | 52 | 96 | –44 |

Group D matches
| BIG | 1 | 2 | HellRaisers |
| Astralis | 2 | 0 | ex-3DMAX |
| Astralis | 2 | 0 | HellRaisers |
| BIG | 2 | 0 | ex-3DMAX |
| HellRaisers | 2 | 0 | ex-3DMAX |
| Astralis | 2 | 1 | BIG |

The favorites Astralis cleaned up group D with relative ease. HellRaisers and BIG also advanced fairly easily, as ex-3DMAX struggled massively, failing to even win one map.

Group D Results

| Team | Score | Map | Score | Team |
|---|---|---|---|---|
| BIG | 16 | Mirage | 9 | HellRaisers |
| BIG | 8 | Train | 16 | HellRaisers |
| BIG | 8 | Overpass | 16 | HellRaisers |
| Astralis | 16 | Mirage | 6 | ex-3DMAX |
| Astralis | 16 | Nuke | 7 | ex-3DMAX |
| Astralis | – | Train | – | ex-3DMAX |
| Astralis | 16 | Dust II | 4 | HellRaisers |
| Astralis | 16 | Inferno | 7 | HellRaisers |
| Astralis | – | Mirage | – | HellRaisers |
| BIG | 16 | Mirage | 13 | ex-3DMAX |
| BIG | 16 | Dust II | 10 | ex-3DMAX |
| BIG | – | Train | – | ex-3DMAX |
| HellRaisers | 16 | Nuke | 10 | ex-3DMAX |
| HellRaisers | 16 | Train | 6 | ex-3DMAX |
| HellRaisers | – | Inferno | – | ex-3DMAX |
| Astralis | 16 | Dust II | 10 | BIG |
| Astralis | 17 | Inferno | 19 | BIG |
| Astralis | 16 | Overpass | 14 | BIG |

=== Stage 2 ===
==== Group E ====
| Pos | Team | W | L | RF | RA | RD |
|---|---|---|---|---|---|---|
| 1 | Fnatic (Note: Fnatic was awarded the top seed over HellRaisers by virtue of defeating HellRaisers.) | 2 | 1 | 118 | 115 | +3 |
| 2 | HellRaisers | 2 | 1 | 107 | 88 | +19 |
| 3 | Aristocracy (Note: The roster of devils.one depart from the team and rebrand as Aristocracy.) (Note: Aristocracy was seeded above OpTic Gaming by virtue of defeating OpTic.) | 1 | 2 | 85 | 95 | –10 |
| 4 | OpTic Gaming | 1 | 2 | 97 | 109 | –12 |

Notes

Group E matches
| OpTic Gaming | 2 | 1 | Fnatic |
| HellRaisers | 2 | 0 | Aristocracy |
| HellRaisers | 1 | 2 | Fnatic |
| OpTic Gaming | 0 | 2 | Aristocracy |
| HellRaisers | 2 | 0 | OpTic Gaming |
| Fnatic | 2 | 0 | Aristocracy |

Fnatic turned things around after losing to OpTic Gaming in Group E, defeating HellRaisers and sweeping Aristocracy. On the other hand, OpTic did start off quite well, but Aristocracy and HellRaisers both swept the Danish team, taking OpTic out of the running of the EPL S9 title. The early HellRaisers victory over Aristocracy would turn out to be the decider for the final Group E spot in the finals, as Fnatic and HellRaisers moved on.

Group E Results

| Team | Score | Map | Score | Team |
|---|---|---|---|---|
| OpTic Gaming | 16 | Inferno | 13 | Fnatic |
| OpTic Gaming | 16 | Nuke | 19 | Fnatic |
| OpTic Gaming | 16 | Dust II | 7 | Fnatic |
| HellRaisers | 16 | Vertigo | 10 | Aristocracy |
| HellRaisers | 16 | Overpass | 13 | Aristocracy |
| HellRaisers | – | Vertigo | – | Aristocracy |
| HellRaisers | 12 | Mirage | 16 | Fnatic |
| HellRaisers | 19 | Overpass | 15 | Fnatic |
| HellRaisers | 12 | Train | 16 | Fnatic |
| OpTic Gaming | 20 | Mirage | 22 | Aristocracy |
| OpTic Gaming | 11 | Nuke | 16 | Aristocracy |
| OpTic Gaming | – | Overpass | – | Aristocracy |
| HellRaisers | 16 | Inferno | 11 | OpTic Gaming |
| HellRaisers | 16 | Mirage | 7 | OpTic Gaming |
| HellRaisers | – | Overpass | – | OpTic Gaming |
| Fnatic | 16 | Nuke | 13 | Aristocracy |
| Fnatic | 16 | Mirage | 11 | Aristocracy |
| Fnatic | – | Train | – | Aristocracy |

==== Group F ====
| Pos | Team | W | L | RF | RA | RD |
|---|---|---|---|---|---|---|
| 1 | North | 3 | 0 | 109 | 80 | +29 |
| 2 | Heroic | 2 | 1 | 93 | 98 | –5 |
| 3 | Natus Vincere | 1 | 2 | 114 | 99 | +15 |
| 4 | BIG | 0 | 3 | 57 | 96 | –39 |

Group F matches
| Natus Vincere | 1 | 2 | North |
| Heroic | 2 | 0 | BIG |
| Natus Vincere | 2 | 0 | BIG |
| Heroic | 0 | 2 | North |
| Natus Vincere | 1 | 2 | Heroic |
| North | 2 | 0 | BIG |

Like Fnatic, North also completely turned things around as it topped Group F, going 3–0, including defeating Na`Vi. Na`Vi was a favorite to head to the Finals, but Heroic upsetting the CIS squad on the last day of European regular season play in a very close third map was the decider, sending Na`Vi home. BIG had some very close maps, but the German team could not pull out a map win.

Group F Results

| Team | Score | Map | Score | Team |
|---|---|---|---|---|
| Natus Vincere | 14 | Overpass | 16 | North |
| Natus Vincere | 16 | Mirage | 13 | North |
| Natus Vincere | 13 | Dust II | 16 | North |
| Heroic | 16 | Inferno | 14 | BIG |
| Heroic | 16 | Overpass | 13 | BIG |
| Heroic | – | Vertigo | – | BIG |
| Natus Vincere | 16 | Dust II | 6 | BIG |
| Natus Vincere | 16 | Mirage | 5 | BIG |
| Natus Vincere | – | Overpass | – | BIG |
| Heroic | 8 | Nuke | 16 | North |
| Heroic | 10 | Mirage | 16 | North |
| Heroic | – | Overpass | – | North |
| Natus Vincere | 9 | Vertigo | 16 | Heroic |
| Natus Vincere | 16 | Mirage | 11 | Heroic |
| Natus Vincere | 14 | Overpass | 16 | Heroic |
| North | 16 | Overpass | 6 | BIG |
| North | 16 | Train | 13 | BIG |
| North | – | Dust II | – | BIG |

=== Europe standings ===
Europe's final standings are below. The top eight move on to the Finals and qualify for next season. 9th to 12th do not qualify for the Finals, but are invited to next season. The bottom four teams will have to play in a relegation phase for a spot in next season. Each team's in-game leader is shown first.

| Place | Team | Prize Money | Roster | Coach |
|---|---|---|---|---|
| 1st-4th | mousesports | TBD | karrigan, chrisJ, frozen, ropz, woxic | Rejin |
| 1st-4th | FaZe Clan | TBD | NiKo, AdreN, GuardiaN, olofmeister, rain | YNk |
| 1st-4th | G2 Esports | TBD | shox, AmaNeK, JaCkz, kennyS, Lucky | maLeK |
| 1st-4th | Astralis | TBD | gla1ve, dev1ce, dupreeh, Magisk, Xyp9x | zonic |
| 5th-6th | Fnatic | TBD | Xizt, Brollan, JW, KRiMZ, twist | Jumpy |
| 5th-6th | North | TBD | valde, aizy, gade, JUGi, Kjaerbye | mithR |
| 7th-8th | HellRaisers | TBD | ANGE1, ISSAA, loWel, nukkye, oskar | lmbt |
| 7th-8th | Heroic | TBD | blameF, es3tag, NaToSaphiX, stavn, friberg | mithR |
| 9th-10th | Aristocracy | US$10,000 | TaZ, dycha, MINISE, mouz, rallen | Loord |
| 9th-10th | Natus Vincere | US$10,000 | Zeus, Edward, s1mple, electronic, flamie | kane |
| 11th-12th | OpTic Gaming | US$8,000 | MSL, k0nfig, niko, refrezh, Snappi | ruggah |
| 11th-12th | BIG | US$8,000 | gob b, denis, tabseN, tiziaN, XANTARES | kakafu |
| 13th-16th | ex-Space Soldiers | US$6,000 | yam, Calyx, imoRR, ngiN, paz | hardstyle |
| 13th-16th | Ninjas in Pyjamas | US$6,000 | Lekr0, dennis, f0rest, GeT RiGhT, REZ | pita |
| 13th-16th | Windigo Gaming | US$6,000 | bubble, blocker, poizon, SHiPZ, v1c7oR | Shockwave |
| 13th-16th | ex-3DMAX | US$6,000 | davidp, hAdji, JiNKZ, LOGAN, Maka | Max0b |

== Americas ==
=== Stage 1 ===
==== Group A ====
| Pos | Team | W | L | RF | RA | RD |
|---|---|---|---|---|---|---|
| 1 | NRG Esports (Note: NRG Esports was given the top seed over eUnited and Renegades by virtue of having more wins than the latter two teams. eUnited was given the second seed by virtue of defeating Renegades.) | 2 | 1 | 95 | 86 | +9 |
| 2 | eUnited | 2 | 1 | 86 | 71 | +15 |
| 3 | Renegades | 2 | 1 | 93 | 85 | +8 |
| 4 | INTZ eSports | 0 | 3 | 64 | 96 | -32 |

Notes

Group A matches
| NRG Esports | 2 | 0 | INTZ eSports |
| Renegades | 0 | 2 | eUnited |
| NRG Esports | 2 | 0 | eUnited |
| Renegades | 2 | 0 | INTZ eSports |
| NRG Esports | 1 | 2 | Renegades |
| eUnited | 2 | 0 | INTZ eSports |

NRG Esports, eUnited, and Renegades all tied in series wins, while INTZ eSports failed to find even a map win. NRG would book a spot in the finals since it took a map off of the Renegades. eUnited was seeded second based on defeating the Renegades.

Group A Results

| Team | Score | Map | Score | Team |
|---|---|---|---|---|
| NRG Esports | 16 | Cache | 9 | INTZ eSports |
| NRG Esports | 16 | Train | 9 | INTZ eSports |
| NRG Esports | – | Nuke | – | INTZ eSports |
| Renegades | 6 | Overpass | 16 | eUnited |
| Renegades | 9 | Mirage | 16 | eUnited |
| Renegades | – | Dust II | – | eUnited |
| NRG Esports | 16 | Dust II | 13 | eUnited |
| NRG Esports | 16 | Mirage | 9 | eUnited |
| NRG Esports | – | Overpass | – | eUnited |
| Renegades | 16 | Dust II | 9 | INTZ eSports |
| Renegades | 16 | Mirage | 13 | INTZ eSports |
| Renegades | – | Train | – | INTZ eSports |
| NRG Esports | 12 | Mirage | 16 | Renegades |
| NRG Esports | 16 | Train | 14 | Renegades |
| NRG Esports | 3 | Inferno | 16 | Renegades |
| eUnited | 16 | Mirage | 13 | INTZ eSports |
| eUnited | 16 | Overpass | 11 | INTZ eSports |
| eUnited | – | Train | – | INTZ eSports |

==== Group B ====
| Pos | Team | W | L | RF | RA | RD |
|---|---|---|---|---|---|---|
| 1 | Team Liquid | 3 | 0 | 108 | 40 | +68 |
| 2 | Ghost Gaming | 2 | 1 | 96 | 101 | -5 |
| 3 | compLexity Gaming | 1 | 2 | 103 | 125 | -22 |
| 4 | Lazarus Esports | 0 | 3 | 58 | 99 | -41 |

Group B matches
| Team Liquid | 2 | 0 | Lazarus Esports |
| Ghost Gaming | 2 | 1 | compLexity Gaming |
| Team Liquid | 2 | 1 | compLexity Gaming |
| Ghost Gaming | 2 | 0 | Lazarus Gaming |
| Team Liquid | 2 | 0 | Ghost Gaming |
| compLexity Gaming | 2 | 0 | Lazarus Gaming |

Team Liquid had a fairly easy time in the group stage, as the top ranked team in the world only suffered a loss to compLexity Gaming (coL), only to stomp coL in the next two maps. The newly formed Lazarus Esports gained good experience against some notable North American teams, but the inexperience proved to be too much to overcome. Ghost Gaming and coL moved on to stage 2 while Liquid went straight to the Finals.

Group B Results

| Team | Score | Map | Score | Team |
|---|---|---|---|---|
| Team Liquid | 16 | Nuke | 2 | Lazarus Esports |
| Team Liquid | 16 | Overpass | 4 | Lazarus Esports |
| Team Liquid | – | Inferno | – | Esports Gaming |
| Ghost Gaming | 16 | Mirage | 19 | compLexity Gaming |
| Ghost Gaming | 16 | Overpass | 13 | compLexity Gaming |
| Ghost Gaming | 19 | Nuke | 15 | compLexity Gaming |
| Team Liquid | 12 | Cache | 16 | compLexity Gaming |
| Team Liquid | 16 | Dust II | 2 | compLexity Gaming |
| Team Liquid | 16 | Inferno | 3 | compLexity Gaming |
| Ghost Gaming | 16 | Inferno | 11 | Lazarus Esports |
| Ghost Gaming | 16 | Overpass | 11 | Lazarus Esports |
| Ghost Gaming | – | Dust II | – | Lazarus Esports |
| Team Liquid | 16 | Mirage | 3 | Ghost Gaming |
| Team Liquid | 16 | Dust II | 10 | Ghost Gaming |
| Team Liquid | – | Nuke | – | Ghost Gaming |
| compLexity Gaming | 19 | Mirage | 17 | Lazarus Esports |
| compLexity Gaming | 16 | Nuke | 13 | Lazarus Esports |
| compLexity Gaming | – | Inferno | – | Lazarus Esports |

==== Group C ====
| Pos | Team | W | L | RF | RA | RD |
|---|---|---|---|---|---|---|
| 1 | Luminosity Gaming (Note: Luminosity Gaming was seeded first by virtue of having more map wins than MIBR or Cloud9. MIBR was seeded second by virtue of beating Cloud9.) | 2 | 1 | 112 | 89 | +23 |
| 2 | MIBR | 2 | 1 | 79 | 60 | +19 |
| 3 | Cloud9 | 2 | 1 | 88 | 90 | -2 |
| 4 | Team Envy | 0 | 3 | 65 | 105 | -40 |

Notes

Group C matches
| MIBR | 0 | 2 | Luminosity Gaming |
| Cloud9 | 2 | 0 | Team Envy |
| MIBR | 2 | 0 | Team Envy |
| Cloud9 | 2 | 0 | Luminosity Gaming |
| MIBR | 2 | 0 | Cloud9 |
| Team Envy | 0 | 2 | Luminosity Gaming |

Luminosity Gaming topped group C in a huge surprise, as the team was not even supposed to be in Pro League to begin with. Team Envy continued to struggle with its lineup, even with its new addition of Sam "s0m" Oh. Envy bottomed out the group while MIBR and Cloud9 stayed alive.

Group C Results

| Team | Score | Map | Score | Team |
|---|---|---|---|---|
| MIBR | 7 | Inferno | 16 | Luminosity Gaming |
| MIBR | 8 | Train | 16 | Luminosity Gaming |
| MIBR | – | Mirage | – | Luminosity Gaming |
| Cloud9 | 16 | Inferno | 8 | Team Envy |
| Cloud9 | 16 | Mirage | 11 | Team Envy |
| Cloud9 | – | Cache | – | Team Envy |
| MIBR | 16 | Cache | 14 | Team Envy |
| MIBR | 16 | Train | 4 | Team Envy |
| MIBR | – | Nuke | – | Team Envy |
| Cloud9 | 16 | Dust II | 11 | Luminosity Gaming |
| Cloud9 | 14 | Inferno | 16 | Luminosity Gaming |
| Cloud9 | 16 | Mirage | 12 | Luminosity Gaming |
| MIBR | 16 | Overpass | 9 | Cloud9 |
| MIBR | 16 | Train | 1 | Cloud9 |
| MIBR | – | Mirage | – | Cloud9 |
| Team Envy | 16 | Train | 9 | Luminosity Gaming |
| Team Envy | 7 | Inferno | 16 | Luminosity Gaming |
| Team Envy | 5 | Cache | 16 | Luminosity Gaming |

==== Group D ====
| Pos | Team | W | L | RF | RA | RD |
|---|---|---|---|---|---|---|
| 1 | DETONA Gaming | 3 | 0 | 120 | 86 | +34 |
| 2 | Isurus Gaming | 2 | 1 | 102 | 70 | +32 |
| 3 | Infinity Esports | 1 | 2 | 80 | 101 | -21 |
| 4 | Denial Esports | 0 | 3 | 80 | 125 | -45 |

Group D matches
| Isurus Gaming | 2 | 0 | Denial Esports |
| Infinity Esports | 0 | 2 | DETONA Gaming |
| Isurus Gaming | 1 | 2 | DETONA Gaming |
| Infinity Esports | 2 | 1 | Denial Esports |
| Isurus Gaming | 2 | 0 | Infinity Esports |
| DETONA Gaming | 2 | 0 | Denial Esports |

The new Denial Esports lineup struggled as it went 0–3 to the other South American teams. DETONA Gaming went straight into the Finals after taking down every team it faced while Isurus Gaming and Infinity Esports would go on to face a tough task in going against experienced North American teams.`

Group D Results

| Team | Score | Map | Score | Team |
|---|---|---|---|---|
| Isurus Gaming | 16 | Inferno | 8 | Denial Esports |
| Isurus Gaming | 16 | Overpass | 2 | Denial Esports |
| Isurus Gaming | – | Mirage | – | Denial Esports |
| Infinity Esports | 6 | Nuke | 16 | DETONA Gaming |
| Infinity Esports | 9 | Inferno | 16 | DETONA Gaming |
| Infinity Esports | – | Train | – | DETONA Gaming |
| Isurus Gaming | 14 | Mirage | 16 | DETONA Gaming |
| Isurus Gaming | 16 | Dust II | 12 | DETONA Gaming |
| Isurus Gaming | 8 | Inferno | 16 | DETONA Gaming |
| Infinity Esports | 19 | Mirage | 17 | Denial Esports |
| Infinity Esports | 14 | Inferno | 16 | Denial Esports |
| Infinity Esports | 16 | Mirage | 4 | Denial Esports |
| Isurus Gaming | 16 | Mirage | 9 | Infinity Esports |
| Isurus Gaming | 16 | Dust II | 7 | Infinity Esports |
| Isurus Gaming | – | Inferno | – | Infinity Esports |
| DETONA Gaming | 28 | Overpass | 24 | Denial Esports |
| DETONA Gaming | 16 | Mirage | 9 | Denial Esports |
| DETONA Gaming | – | Train | – | Denial Esports |

=== Stage 2 ===
==== Group E ====
| Pos | Team | W | L | RF | RA | RD |
|---|---|---|---|---|---|---|
| 1 | MIBR | 3 | 0 | 107 | 70 | +37 |
| 2 | Renegades | 2 | 1 | 92 | 73 | +19 |
| 3 | Isurus Gaming | 1 | 2 | 83 | 104 | -21 |
| 4 | compLexity Gaming | 0 | 3 | 98 | 133 | -35 |

Group E matches
| Renegades | 2 | 1 | compLexity Gaming |
| MIBR | 2 | 0 | Isurus Gaming |
| Isurus Gaming | 0 | 2 | Renegades |
| MIBR | 2 | 1 | compLexity Gaming |
| MIBR | 2 | 0 | Renegades |
| Isurus Gaming | 2 | 1 | compLexity Gaming |

MIBR readjusted and took down every one in Group E, with only a slip up against coL. Renegades nearly made the Finals, but the loss to MIBR on the last day was the decider. Isurus upset coL to round out Group E and earned an extra US$1,000.

Group E Results

| Team | Score | Map | Score | Team |
|---|---|---|---|---|
| Renegades | 16 | Nuke | 4 | compLexity Gaming |
| Renegades | 12 | Dust II | 16 | compLexity Gaming |
| Renegades | 16 | Mirage | 8 | compLexity Gaming |
| MIBR | 16 | Dust II | 10 | Isurus Gaming |
| MIBR | 16 | Overpass | 14 | Isurus Gaming |
| MIBR | – | Train | – | Isurus Gaming |
| Isurus Gaming | 9 | Mirage | 16 | Renegades |
| Isurus Gaming | 4 | Dust II | 16 | Renegades |
| Isurus Gaming | – | Train | – | Renegades |
| MIBR | 11 | Dust II | 16 | compLexity Gaming |
| MIBR | 16 | Overpass | 1 | compLexity Gaming |
| MIBR | 16 | Mirage | 13 | compLexity Gaming |
| MIBR | 16 | Mirage | 2 | Renegades |
| MIBR | 16 | Train | 14 | Renegades |
| MIBR | – | Dust II | – | Renegades |
| Isurus Gaming | 11 | Nuke | 16 | compLexity Gaming |
| Isurus Gaming | 19 | Train | 16 | compLexity Gaming |
| Isurus Gaming | 16 | Dust II | 8 | compLexity Gaming |

==== Group F ====
| Pos | Team | W | L | RF | RA | RD |
|---|---|---|---|---|---|---|
| 1 | Cloud9 | 3 | 0 | 117 | 84 | +33 |
| 2 | Ghost Gaming | 2 | 1 | 116 | 99 | +17 |
| 3 | eUnited | 1 | 2 | 111 | 101 | +10 |
| 4 | Infinity Esports | 0 | 3 | 36 | 96 | -60 |

Group F matches
| eUnited | 1 | 2 | Cloud9 |
| Ghost Gaming | 2 | 0 | Infinity Esports |
| Ghost Gaming | 2 | 1 | eUnited |
| Cloud9 | 2 | 0 | Infinity Esports |
| Ghost Gaming | 1 | 2 | Cloud9 |
| eUnited | 2 | 0 | Infinity Esports |

Like MIBR, Cloud9 topped its group, defeating Ghost on the last day despite its recent struggles. Infinity could not find some success like Isurus did, including getting 16-0'd by eUnited.

Group F Results

| Team | Score | Map | Score | Team | | | | | |
|---|---|---|---|---|---|---|---|---|---|
| eUnited | 16 | Inferno | 8 | Cloud9 | | | | | |
| eUnited | 14 | Nuke | 16 | Cloud9 | | | | | |
| eUnited | 7 | Dust II | 16 | Cloud9 | | | | | |
| Ghost Gaming | 16 | Mirage | 7 | Infinity Esports | | | | | |
| Ghost Gaming | 16 | Nuke | 5 | Infinity Esports | | | | | |
| Ghost Gaming | – | Dust II | – | Infinity Esports | | | | | |
| eUnited | 9 | Mirage | 16 | Ghost Gaming | | | | | |
| eUnited | 22 | Dust II | 18 | Ghost Gaming | | | | | |
| eUnited | 11 | Mirage | 16 | Ghost Gaming | | | | | |
| Cloud9 | 16 | Train | 2 | Infinity Esports | | | | | |
| Cloud9 | 16 | Inferno | 11 | Infinity Esports | | | | | |
| Cloud9 | – | Dust II | – | Infinity Esports | | | | | |
| Ghost Gaming | 16 | Inferno | 13 | Cloud9 | | | | | |
| eUnited | 8 | Nuke | 16 | Cloud9 | | | | | |
| eUnited | 10 | Dust II | 16 | Cloud9 | | | | | |
| eUnited | 16 | Dust II | 0 | Infinity Esports | | | | | |
| eUnited | 16 | Mirage | 11 | Infinity Esports | Cloud9 | – | Inferno | – | Infinity Esports |

=== Americas standings ===
The Americas' final standings are below. The top six move on to the Finals and qualify for next season. 7th to 12th do not qualify for the Finals, but are invited to next season. The bottom four teams will have to play in a relegation phase for a spot in next season. Each team's in-game leader is shown first.

| Place | Team | Prize Money | Roster | Coach |
|---|---|---|---|---|
| 1st-4th | NRG Esports | TBD | daps, Brehze, Ethan, tarik, CeRq | ImAPet |
| 1st-4th | Team Liquid | TBD | nitr0, ELiGE, Stewie2K, NAF, Twistzz | adreN |
| 1st-4th | Luminosity Gaming | TBD | steel, boltz, HEN1, LUCAS1, NEKIZ | zakk |
| 1st-4th | DETONA Gaming | TBD | tiburci0, hardzao, prt, Tuurtle, v$m | rikz |
| 5th-6th | MIBR | TBD | FalleN, coldzera, felps, fer, TACO | zews |
| 5th-6th | Cloud9 | TBD | Golden, autimatic, RUSH, vice, cajunb | valens |
| 7th-8th | Renegades | US$8,000 | AZR, jks, liazz, jkaem, smooya | kassad |
| 7th-8th | Ghost Gaming | US$8,000 | steel, FREAKAZOiD, koosta, neptune, Wardell | JamezIRL |
| 9th-10th | Isurus Gaming | US$7,000 | Noktse, 1962, meyern, reversive, maxujas | pino |
| 9th-10th | eUnited | US$7,000 | Cooper-, food, motm, vanity, MarkE | a2z |
| 11th-12th | compLexity Gaming | US$6,000 | stanislaw, ShahZaM, SicK, yay, dephh | Warden |
| 11th-12th | Infinity Esports | US$6,000 | spamzzy, Daveys, points, cruzN, malbsMd | alone |
| 13th-16th | INTZ eSports | US$5,000 | kNgV-, chelo, destiny, xand, yeL | Apoka |
| 13th-16th | Lazarus Esports | US$5,000 | Zellsis, Infinite, swag, yay, Subroza | fRoD |
| 13th-16th | Team Envy | US$5,000 | Nifty, FugLy, jdm64, s0m, ANDROID | Eley |
| 13th-16th | Denial Esports | US$5,000 | sickLy, blue, Link, sam_A, VAATI | Emmet |

== Asia ==
=== Stage 1 ===
==== East Asia ====
| Pos | Team | W | L | RF | RA | RD |
|---|---|---|---|---|---|---|
| 1 | TyLoo (Note: TyLoo was awarded the top seed by virtue of defeating MVP PK.) | 2 | 1 | 112 | 78 | +34 |
| 2 | MVP PK | 2 | 1 | 91 | 77 | +14 |
| 3 | ViCi Gaming (Note: ViCi Gaming was awarded the third seed by virtue of defeating 5Power Gaming.) | 1 | 2 | 76 | 101 | -25 |
| 4 | 5Power Gaming | 1 | 2 | 92 | 115 | -23 |

Notes

East Asia matches
| TyLoo | 1 | 2 | 5Power Gaming |
| ViCi Gaming | 0 | 2 | MVP PK |
| TyLoo | 2 | 1 | MVP PK |
| ViCi Gaming | 2 | 1 | 5Power Gaming |
| TyLoo | 2 | 0 | ViCi Gaming |
| MVP PK | 2 | 0 | 5Power Gaming |

5Power Gaming started very strong by defeating favorites TyLoo while MVP PK took down the second seeded ViCi Gaming. However, 5Power's success would not last long as it fell to ViCi and MVP PK was downed by TyLoo. TyLoo and MVP PK would lock their spots for the Asia finals after taking down ViCi and 5Power, respectively. on the last day.

East Asia Results

| Team | Score | Map | Score | Team |
|---|---|---|---|---|
| TyLoo | 14 | Dust II | 16 | 5Power Gaming |
| TyLoo | 16 | Mirage | 9 | 5Power Gaming |
| TyLoo | 12 | Inferno | 16 | 5Power Gaming |
| ViCi Gaming | 11 | Inferno | 16 | MVP PK |
| ViCi Gaming | 14 | Overpass | 16 | MVP PK |
| ViCi Gaming | – | Mirage | – | MVP PK |
| TyLoo | 16 | Inferno | 7 | MVP PK |
| TyLoo | 22 | Mirage | 20 | MVP PK |
| TyLoo | – | Overpass | – | MVP PK |
| ViCi Gaming | 9 | Dust II | 16 | 5Power Gaming |
| ViCi Gaming | 16 | Nuke | 9 | 5Power Gaming |
| TyLoo | 16 | Mirage | 12 | 5Power Gaming |
| TyLoo | 16 | Dust II | 1 | ViCi Gaming |
| TyLoo | 16 | Mirage | 9 | ViCi Gaming |
| TyLoo | – | Overpass | – | ViCi Gaming |
| MVP PK | 16 | Dust II | 7 | 5Power Gaming |
| MVP PK | 16 | Inferno | 7 | 5Power Gaming |
| MVP PK | – | Train | – | 5Power Gaming |

==== Southeast Asia ====
| Pos | Team | W | L | RF | RA | RD |
|---|---|---|---|---|---|---|
| 1 | Lucid Dream | 3 | 0 | 126 | 88 | +38 |
| 2 | ALPHA Red | 2 | 1 | 87 | 75 | +12 |
| 3 | B.O.O.T-dream[S]cape | 1 | 2 | 105 | 102 | +3 |
| 4 | Entity Gaming | 0 | 3 | 11 | 64 | -53 |

Southeast Asia matches
| B.O.O.T-dream[S]cape | 2 | 0 | Entity Gaming |
| Lucid Dream | 2 | 1 | ALPHA Red |
| B.O.O.T-dream[S]cape | 1 | 2 | ALPHA Red |
| Lucid Dream | 2 | 0 | Entity Gaming |
| B.O.O.T-dream[S]cape | 1 | 2 | Lucid Dream |
| Lucid Dream | W | FF | Entity Gaming |

The two Thai teams overcame B.O.O.T-dream[S]cape to secure spots in the Asia finals. Entity Gaming from India struggled as it only garnered eleven rounds in four maps before eventually forfeiting its last match to ALPHA Red.

Southeast Asia Results

| Team | Score | Map | Score | Team |
|---|---|---|---|---|
| B.O.O.T-dream[S]cape | 16 | Inferno | 2 | Entity Gaming |
| B.O.O.T-dream[S]cape | 16 | Mirage | 2 | Entity Gaming |
| B.O.O.T-dream[S]cape | – | Dust II | – | Entity Gaming |
| Lucid Dream | 10 | Dust II | 16 | ALPHA Red |
| Lucid Dream | 16 | Mirage | 13 | ALPHA Red |
| Lucid Dream | 16 | Train | 12 | ALPHA Red |
| B.O.O.T-dream[S]cape | 16 | Mirage | 14 | ALPHA Red |
| B.O.O.T-dream[S]cape | 3 | Dust II | 16 | ALPHA Red |
| B.O.O.T-dream[S]cape | 14 | Train | 16 | ALPHA Red |
| Lucid Dream | 16 | Mirage | 4 | Entity Gaming |
| Lucid Dream | 16 | Nuke | 3 | Entity Gaming |
| Lucid Dream | – | Dust II | – | Entity Gaming |
| B.O.O.T-dream[S]cape | 22 | Nuke | 20 | Lucid Dream |
| B.O.O.T-dream[S]cape | 7 | Dust II | 16 | Lucid Dream |
| B.O.O.T-dream[S]cape | 11 | Mirage | 16 | Lucid Dream |
| ALPHA Red | W | Mirage | FF | Entity Gaming |
| ALPHA Red | W | Dust II | FF | Entity Gaming |
| ALPHA Red | – | Train | – | Entity Gaming |

=== Stage 2 ===
| Pos | Team | W | L | RF | RA | RD |
|---|---|---|---|---|---|---|
| 1 | TyLoo | 3 | 0 | 112 | 82 | +30 |
| 2 | MVP PK | 2 | 1 | 110 | 77 | +33 |
| 3 | Lucid Dream | 1 | 2 | 72 | 82 | -10 |
| 4 | ALPHA Red | 0 | 3 | 46 | 99 | -53 |

Asia qualifier matches
| Lucid Dream | 0 | 2 | MVP PK |
| TyLoo | 2 | 0 | ALPHA Red |
| Lucid Dream | 2 | 0 | ALPHA Red |
| TyLoo | 2 | 1 | MVP PK |
| TyLoo | 2 | 0 | Lucid Dream |
| MVP PK | 2 | 0 | ALPHA Red |

The two East Asian team proved to be superior to the Southeast Asian teams, but it was TyLoo to take the Finals spot over MVP PK in a close three game set. Lucid Dream took down ALPHA Red to place third.

Stage 2 Results

| Team | Score | Map | Score | Team |
|---|---|---|---|---|
| Lucid Dream | 10 | Dust II | 16 | MVP PK |
| Lucid Dream | 2 | Train | 16 | MVP PK |
| Lucid Dream | – | Mirage | – | MVP PK |
| TyLoo | 16 | Overpass | 6 | ALPHA Red |
| TyLoo | 16 | Mirage | 6 | ALPHA Red |
| TyLoo | – | Inferno | – | ALPHA Red |
| Lucid Dream | 16 | Mirage | 8 | ALPHA Red |
| Lucid Dream | 16 | Inferno | 10 | ALPHA Red |
| Lucid Dream | – | Inferno | – | ALPHA Red |
| TyLoo | 16 | Dust II | 14 | MVP PK |
| TyLoo | 16 | Mirage | 19 | MVP PK |
| TyLoo | 16 | Train | 10 | MVP PK |
| TyLoo | 16 | Overpass | 14 | Lucid Dream |
| TyLoo | 16 | Mirage | 14 | Lucid Dream |
| TyLoo | – | Dust II | – | Lucid Dream |
| MVP PK | 16 | Dust II | 1 | ALPHA Red |
| MVP PK | 19 | Mirage | 16 | ALPHA Red |
| MVP PK | – | Inferno | – | ALPHA Red |

=== Asia standings ===
The Asian final standings are below. The top team moved on to the Finals and qualifies for next season. 2nd to 6th do not qualify for the Finals, but are invited to next season. The bottom two teams will have to play in a relegation phase for a spot in next season. Each team's in-game leader is shown first.

| Place | Team | Prize Money | Roster | Coach |
|---|---|---|---|---|
| 1st | TyLoo | TBD | BnTeT, Attacker, somebody, Summer, xccurate | |
| 2nd | MVP PK | US$5,500 | hsk, stax, xeta, XigN, zeff | termi |
| 3rd | Lucid Dream | US$4,500 | cbbk, Geniuss, PTC, qqgod, wannafly | |
| 4th | ALPHA Red | US$4,000 | MAIROLLS, foxz, Kntz, Olivia, SeveN89 | |
| 5th-6th | B.O.O.T-dream[S]cape | US$0 | alecks, Benkai, Bobosaur, splashske, d4v41 | |
| 5th-6th | ViCi Gaming | US$0 | advent, aumaN, zhokiNg, kaze, Freeman | |
| 7th-8th | Entity Gaming | US$0 | Dav, Amaterasu, Excali, Psy, DJOXiC | soLo |
| 7th-8th | 5Power Gaming | US$0 | xiaosaGe, shuadapai, Viva, dobu, kabal | Xiaoxizi |

== Oceania ==
=== Stage 1 ===
==== Group A ====
| Pos | Team | W | L | RF | RA | RD |
|---|---|---|---|---|---|---|
| 1 | ORDER | 3 | 0 | 107 | 87 | +20 |
| 2 | Athletico Esports (Note: Athletico Esports was awarded the second seed by virtue of having more map wins than Breakaway Esports or Paradox Gaming. Breakaway was awarded the third seed by virtue of defeating Paradox.) | 1 | 2 | 106 | 102 | +4 |
| 3 | Breakaway Esports | 1 | 2 | 95 | 99 | -4 |
| 4 | Paradox Gaming | 1 | 2 | 89 | 109 | -20 |

Notes

Group A matches
| ORDER | 2 | 0 | Paradox Gaming |
| Breakaway Esports | 0 | 2 | Athletico Esports |
| ORDER | 2 | 1 | Athletico Esports |
| Breakaway Esports | 2 | 0 | Paradox Gaming |
| ORDER | 2 | 1 | Breakaway Esports |
| Athletico Esports | 0 | 2 | Paradox Gaming |

ORDER had an easy time against its competitors as it went 3–0. Athletico Esports was able to steal away the second seed based on having more map wins than either Breakaway Esports or Paradox Gaming.

Group A Results

| Team | Score | Map | Score | Team |
|---|---|---|---|---|
| ORDER | 16 | Mirage | 12 | Paradox Gaming |
| ORDER | 16 | Nuke | 4 | Paradox Gaming |
| ORDER | – | Inferno | – | Paradox Gaming |
| Breakaway Esports | 10 | Mirage | 16 | Athletico Esports |
| Breakaway Esports | 11 | Nuke | 16 | Athletico Esports |
| Breakaway Esports | – | Overpass | – | Athletico Esports |
| ORDER | 16 | Mirage | 11 | Athletico Esports |
| ORDER | 5 | Nuke | 16 | Athletico Esports |
| ORDER | 16 | Inferno | 5 | Athletico Esports |
| Breakaway Esports | 19 | Mirage | 16 | Paradox Gaming |
| Breakaway Esports | 16 | Nuke | 13 | Paradox Gaming |
| Breakaway Esports | – | Overpass | – | Paradox Gaming |
| ORDER | 16 | Nuke | 11 | Breakaway Esports |
| ORDER | 6 | Inferno | 16 | Breakaway Esports |
| ORDER | 16 | Mirage | 12 | Breakaway Esports |
| Athletico Esports | 13 | Mirage | 16 | Paradox Gaming |
| Athletico Esports | 16 | Overpass | 12 | Paradox Gaming |
| Athletico Esports | 13 | Cache | 16 | Paradox Gaming |

==== Group B ====
| Pos | Team | W | L | RF | RA | RD |
|---|---|---|---|---|---|---|
| 1 | Grayhound Gaming | 3 | 0 | 99 | 58 | 41 |
| 2 | Chiefs Esports Club | 2 | 1 | 83 | 71 | +12 |
| 3 | Avant Gaming | 1 | 2 | 84 | 86 | -2 |
| 4 | Ground Zero Gaming | 0 | 3 | 45 | 96 | -51 |

Group B matches
| Grayhound Gaming | 2 | 0 | Ground Zero Gaming |
| Chiefs Esports Club | 2 | 0 | Avant Gaming |
| Grayhound Gaming | 2 | 0 | Avant Gaming |
| Chiefs Esports Club | 2 | 0 | Ground Zero Gaming |
| Grayhound Gaming | 2 | 0 | Chiefs Esports Club |
| Avant Gaming | 2 | 0 | Ground Zero Gaming |

The favorites Grayhound Gaming had an even easier time than ORDER as it cruised to a 3–0 scoreline without dropping a map. Chiefs Esports Club defeated Avant Gaming on the first day of group B to take the second seed while Ground Zero Gaming did not even take a single map.

Group B Results

| Team | Score | Map | Score | Team |
|---|---|---|---|---|
| Grayhound Gaming | 16 | Inferno | 4 | Ground Zero Gaming |
| Grayhound Gaming | 16 | Nuke | 6 | Ground Zero Gaming |
| Grayhound Gaming | – | Mirage | – | Ground Zero Gaming |
| Chiefs Esports Club | 16 | Train | 13 | Avant Gaming |
| Chiefs Esports Club | 16 | Nuke | 10 | Avant Gaming |
| Chiefs Esports Club | – | Mirage | – | Avant Gaming |
| Grayhound Gaming | 16 | Mirage | 13 | Avant Gaming |
| Grayhound Gaming | 19 | Dust II | 16 | Avant Gaming |
| Grayhound Gaming | – | Overpass | – | Avant Gaming |
| Chiefs Esports Club | 16 | Dust II | 8 | Ground Zero Gaming |
| Chiefs Esports Club | 16 | Nuke | 8 | Ground Zero Gaming |
| Chiefs Esports Club | – | Inferno | – | Ground Zero Gaming |
| Grayhound Gaming | 16 | Mirage | 11 | Chiefs Esports Club |
| Grayhound Gaming | 16 | Overpass | 8 | Chiefs Esports Club |
| Grayhound Gaming | – | Nuke | – | Chiefs Esports Club |
| Avant Gaming | 16 | Nuke | 9 | Ground Zero Gaming |
| Avant Gaming | 16 | Inferno | 10 | Ground Zero Gaming |
| Chiefs Esports Club | – | Mirage | – | Ground Zero Gaming |

=== Stage 2 ===
| Pos | Team | W | L | RF | RA | RD |
|---|---|---|---|---|---|---|
| 1 | Grayhound Gaming | 3 | 0 | 73 | 49 | +24 |
| 2 | Chiefs Esports Club | 2 | 1 | 66 | 69 | -3 |
| 3 | ORDER | 1 | 2 | 60 | 81 | -21 |
| 4 | Athletico Esports | 0 | 3 | 0 | 0 | 0 |

With Athletico not able to make the Oceania finals, it was a quick group. As expected, Grayhound topped the group and booked a Finals spot without dropping a map as Chiefs and ORDER were sent home.

Oceania qualifier matches
| ORDER | 1 | 2 | Chiefs Esports Club |
| Grayhound Gaming | W | FF | Athletico Esports |
| ORDER | W | FF | Athletico Esports |
| Grayhound Gaming | 2 | 0 | Chiefs Esports Club |
| Grayhound Gaming | 2 | 0 | ORDER |
| Chiefs Esports Club | W | FF | Athletico Esports |

Stage 2 Results

| Team | Score | Map | Score | Team |
|---|---|---|---|---|
| ORDER | 6 | Overpass | 16 | Chiefs Esports Club |
| ORDER | 16 | Inferno | 11 | Chiefs Esports Club |
| ORDER | 12 | Nuke | 16 | Chiefs Esports Club |
| Grayhound Gaming | W | Mirage | FF | Athletico Esports |
| Grayhound Gaming | W | Inferno | FF | Athletico Esports |
| Grayhound Gaming | W | Nuke | FF | Athletico Esports |
| ORDER | W | | FF | Athletico Esports |
| ORDER | W | | FF | Athletico Esports |
| ORDER | W | | FF | Athletico Esports |
| Grayhound Gaming | 19 | Dust II | 17 | Chiefs Esports Club |
| Grayhound Gaming | 16 | Overpass | 6 | Chiefs Esports Club |
| Grayhound Gaming | – | Nuke | – | Chiefs Esports Club |
| Grayhound Gaming | 16 | Train | 7 | ORDER |
| Grayhound Gaming | 22 | Overpass | 19 | ORDER |
| Grayhound Gaming | – | Nuke | – | ORDER |
| Chiefs Esports Club | W | | FF | Athletico Esports |
| Chiefs Esports Club | W | | FF | Athletico Esports |
| Chiefs Esports Club | W | | FF | Athletico Esports |

=== Oceania standings ===
Oceania's final standings are below. The top team moved on to the Finals and qualifies for next season. 2nd to 6th do not qualify for the Finals, but are invited to next season. The bottom two teams will have to play in a relegation phase for a spot in next season. Each team's in-game leader is shown first.

| Place | Team | Prize Money | Roster | Coach |
|---|---|---|---|---|
| 1st | Grayhound Gaming | TBD | dexter, DickStacy, Malta, Sico, erkaSt | NeiL_M |
| 2nd | Chiefs Esports Club | US$5,500 | tucks, BL1TZ, Texta, ofnu, zewsy | ferg |
| 3rd | ORDER | US$4,500 | emagine, aliStair, hats, INS, zeph | Elmapuddy |
| 4th | Athletico Esports | US$4,000 | smooth_criminal22, ADK, Dezibel, JD, Teal | |
| 5th-6th | Breakaway Esports | US$0 | J1rah, HaZR, Llamas, Noisia, YDNA | |
| 5th-6th | Avant Gaming | US$0 | ap0c, eLUSIVE, mizu, RaZ, soju_j | dayV1D |
| 7th-8th | Paradox Gaming | US$0 | Chub, keeyto, Kingfisher, Noobster, Valiance | |
| 7th-8th | Ground Zero Gaming | US$0 | Xtinct, bURNRUOk, MoeycQ, void, Zemp | |

== Finals ==
The finalized teams are shown below. Each team's HLTV.org ranking for June 17, 2019 – the final rankings before the Finals – is shown next to the team.

Europe

- Astralis (2)
- FaZe Clan (6)
- G2 Esports (15)
- mousesports (14)
- Fnatic (7)
- North (8)
- HellRaisers (25)
- Heroic (29)

Americas

- DETONA Gaming (59)
- Luminosity Gaming (44)
- NRG Esports (9)
- Team Liquid (1)
- Cloud9 (31)
- MIBR (10)

Asia

- TyLoo (46)

Oceania

- Grayhound Gaming (19)

=== Broadcast talent ===
Desk host

- Tres "stunna" Saranthus

Stage host

- Olivier Morin

Interviewer

- James Banks

Commentators

- Tom "Tombizz" Bissmire
- Anders Blume
- Henry "HenryG" Greer
- Jason "JKaplan" Kaplan
- Jason "moses" O'Toole
- Jack "Jacky" Peters
- Alex "Machine" Richardson
- Sudhen "Bleh" Wahengbam

Analysts

- Chad "SPUNJ" Burchill
- Mathieu "Maniac" Quiquerez
- Jacob "Pimp" Winneche

Observers

- Jake "Jak3y" Elton
- Alex "Rushly" Rush

=== Group stage ===
==== Group A ====
G2 Esports was barely able to escape a scare from Grayhound Gaming and NRG Esports took down Fnatic in a close map. Astralis continued to roll as it took down the struggling Cloud9 while Heroic took advantage of DETONA Gaming's inexperience to bump the Brazilians down with relative ease. NRG then took down G2 in a very close three game set, with the latter two games going into overtime. Astralis had no trouble taking out its compatriots in Heroic to move on. Grayhound put up a fight against Fnatic, but the Swedes prevailed in the end while Cloud9 had little trouble putting away DETONA. Heroic then eliminated Fnatic in a series that went three games while G2 survived against Cloud9 in two close games. NRG upset Astralis in the winner's finals to top group A and earn a bye for the playoffs. In the loser's side, G2 took down Heroic, with Kenny "kennyS" Schrub leading the way for the French.

Upper round 1
EU | G2 Esports | 1
OC | Grayhound Gaming | 0
EU | Fnatic | 0
AM | NRG Esports | 1
EU | Astralis | 1
AM | Cloud9 | 0
AM | DETONA Gaming | 0
EU | Heroic | 1
Lower round 1
OC | Grayhound Gaming | 0
EU | Fnatic | 2
AM | Cloud9 | 2
AM | DETONA Gaming | 0

Upper round 2
EU | G2 Esports | 1
AM | NRG Esports | 2
EU | Astralis | 2
EU | Heroic | 0
Lower round 2
EU | Heroic | 2
EU | Fnatic | 1
EU | G2 Esports | 2
AM | Cloud9 | 0

Upper final
AM | NRG Esports | 2
EU | Astralis | 1
Lower qualifier
EU | Heroic | 0
EU | G2 Esports | 2

Group A Results

Group A matches
| Team | Score | Map | Score | Team |
|---|---|---|---|---|
| G2 Esports | 16 | Nuke | 13 | Grayhound Gaming |
| Fnatic | 12 | Nuke | 16 | NRG Esports |
| Astralis | 16 | Inferno | 9 | Cloud9 |
| DETONA Gaming | 8 | Dust II | 16 | Heroic |
| G2 Esports | 16 | Train | 11 | NRG Esports |
| G2 Esports | 17 | Dust II | 19 | NRG Esports |
| G2 Esports | 17 | Overpass | 19 | NRG Esports |
| Astralis | 16 | Vertigo | 7 | Heroic |
| Astralis | 16 | Inferno | 7 | Heroic |
| Astralis | – | Dust II | – | Heroic |
| Grayhound Gaming | 11 | Dust II | 16 | Fnatic |
| Grayhound Gaming | 13 | Train | 16 | Fnatic |
| Grayhound Gaming | – | Inferno | – | Fnatic |
| Cloud9 | 16 | Dust II | 4 | DETONA Gaming |
| Cloud9 | 16 | Mirage | 9 | DETONA Gaming |
| Cloud9 | – | Inferno | – | DETONA Gaming |
| Heroic | 16 | Nuke | 7 | Fnatic |
| Heroic | 12 | Mirage | 16 | Fnatic |
| Heroic | 16 | Overpass | 6 | Fnatic |
| G2 Esports | 16 | Inferno | 12 | Cloud9 |
| G2 Esports | 16 | Overpass | 13 | Cloud9 |
| G2 Esports | – | Nuke | – | Cloud9 |
| NRG Esports | 16 | Train | 13 | Astralis |
| NRG Esports | 8 | Nuke | 16 | Astralis |
| NRG Esports | 16 | Dust II | 12 | Astralis |
| Heroic | 3 | Vertigo | 16 | G2 Esports |
| Heroic | 3 | Dust II | 16 | G2 Esports |
| Heroic | – | Nuke | – | G2 Esports |

==== Group B ====
FaZe Clan edged out TyLoo in the group B opener while North upset Team Liquid on Dust II. mousesports continued to look strong with a win over MIBR while HellRaisers made an all European winner's side with a win over Luminosity Gaming. North fought hard, but FaZe managed to take the series over the Danes in a third map overtime victory. mousesports easily took down HellRaisers to set the winner's side. TyLoo could not get anything done against Liquid as the Americans easily moved on while MIBR got revenge against Luminosity. HellRaisers gave Liquid a scare, but Liquid somehow prevailed and came back in the third map from an 11–14 deficit to a 16–14 win. MIBR easily took down North in the first map, but North came back in the second map; in the third map, MIBR had to rally a bit after being down most of the match to secure the series, with heroics from Fernando "fer" Alvarenga. Finn "karrigan" Andersen took out the team that kicked him in FaZe to help mousesports secure the first seed in group B. On the loser's side, Liquid continued to have success against MIBR in two maps to secure a spot in the playoffs.

Upper round 1
EU | FaZe Clan | 1
AS | TyLoo | 0
EU | North | 1
AM | Team Liquid | 0
EU | mousesports | 1
AM | MIBR | 0
EU | HellRaisers | 1
AM | Luminosity Gaming | 0
Lower round 1
AS | TyLoo | 0
AM | Team Liquid | 2
AM | MIBR | 2
AM | Luminosity Gaming | 0

Upper round 2
EU | FaZe Clan | 2
EU | North | 1
EU | mousesports | 2
EU | HellRaisers | 0
Lower round 2
EU | HellRaisers | 1
AM | Team Liquid | 2
EU | North | 1
AM | MIBR | 2

Upper final
EU | FaZe Clan | 0
EU | mousesports | 2
Lower qualifier
AM | Team Liquid | 2
AM | MIBR | 0

Group B Results

Group A matches
| Team | Score | Map | Score | Team |
|---|---|---|---|---|
| FaZe Clan | 16 | Vertigo | 12 | TyLoo |
| North | 16 | Dust II | 13 | Team Liquid |
| mousesports | 16 | Inferno | 8 | MIBR |
| HellRaisers | 16 | Mirage | 7 | Luminosity Gaming |
| TyLoo | 6 | Mirage | 16 | Team Liquid |
| TyLoo | 7 | Overpass | 16 | Team Liquid |
| TyLoo | – | Inferno | – | Team Liquid |
| MIBR | 16 | Mirage | 9 | Luminosity Gaming |
| MIBR | 16 | Dust II | 13 | Luminosity Gaming |
| MIBR | – | Train | – | Luminosity Gaming |
| FaZe Clan | 4 | Inferno | 16 | North |
| FaZe Clan | 16 | Mirage | 8 | North |
| FaZe Clan | 19 | Dust II | 16 | North |
| mousesports | 16 | Mirage | 5 | HellRaisers |
| mousesports | 16 | Nuke | 5 | HellRaisers |
| mousesports | – | Inferno | – | HellRaisers |
| HellRaisers | 11 | Vertigo | 16 | Team Liquid |
| HellRaisers | 16 | Inferno | 14 | Team Liquid |
| HellRaisers | 14 | Overpass | 16 | Team Liquid |
| North | 5 | Mirage | 16 | MIBR |
| North | 16 | Inferno | 13 | MIBR |
| North | 5 | Overpass | 16 | MIBR |
| FaZe Clan | 12 | Train | 16 | mousesports |
| FaZe Clan | 12 | Vertigo | 16 | mousesports |
| FaZe Clan | – | Nuke | – | mousesports |
| Team Liquid | 16 | Mirage | 13 | MIBR |
| Team Liquid | 16 | Dust II | 9 | MIBR |
| Team Liquid | – | Vertigo | – | MIBR |

=== Playoffs ===
Quarterfinals
B2 | FaZe Clan | 0
A3 | G2 Esports | 2
A2 | Astralis | 1
B3 | Team Liquid | 2

Semifinals
A1 | NRG Esports | 0
A3 | G2 Esports | 2
B1 | mousesports | 0
B3 | Team Liquid | 2

Grand Finals
A3 | G2 Esports | 1
B3 | Team Liquid | 3

==== Round of 6 ====
Nikola "NiKo" Kovač had a very strong game for FaZe Clan, but the rest of his team could not get anything going, as G2 Esports took advantage of that, led by Lucas "Lucky" Chastang's 21 kills and 6 assists. FaZe's star players Håvard "rain" Nygaard and Ladislav "GuardiaN" Kovács struggled massively as they had the fewest kills on the server. The second game on Dust II ended in a close first half, with G2 leading 9–6. However, vintage performances from Richard "shox" Papillon and kennyS spurred G2 to running away with the second half and eliminating FaZe.

Astralis versus Team Liquid was the story during Astralis's winning era, as the North Americans almost always failed to crack the Astralis puzzle. After a Danish 12–3 first half, Liquid brought it all the way to 15–12, only to have Astralis close it out and it looked like Astralis was going to run away with it again. However, in the second map, Liquid carried that second half momentum from the first map to a 14–1 first half on the second map, despite Nicolai "dev1ce" Reedtz's 23 kills to lead the server. Liquid would tie up the series. The third map saw Astralis take an 11–4 halftime lead, but nine unanswered rounds by Liquid suddenly put the Americans up 13–11. Astralis would take two more rounds, but Liquid took out the Danes to headed to the semifinals, as Jonathan "EliGE" Jablonowski lead the way with 28 kills.

Round of 6 matches
| Team | Score | Map | Score | Team |
|---|---|---|---|---|
| FaZe Clan | 12 | Train | 16 | G2 Esports |
| FaZe Clan | 8 | Dust II | 16 | G2 Esports |
| FaZe Clan | – | Inferno | – | G2 Esports |
| Astralis | 16 | Overpass | 12 | Team Liquid |
| Astralis | 6 | Inferno | 16 | Team Liquid |
| Astralis | 13 | Vertigo | 16 | Team Liquid |

==== Semifinals ====
The first semifinal match was between NRG, still fielding daps, against G2 Esports, on Dust 2. The French side started out with a dominating 8–1 lead on the T side. However, NRG managed to win the last 6 rounds in the half due to back-to-back 1v1s by Vincent "Brehze" Cayonte to end up with an 8–7 scoreline favoring G2. NRG took the momentum after winning the pistol round on the T side, and ended up taking 4 rounds in a row. However, G2 eventually found their footing on the CT side and the map ended 16–12 for the French side, with kennyS having a great performance of 28 kills. On the second map, Train, NRG had a dominant T-side and ended up continuing this into the 2nd half, despite an Ace by kennyS on the 2nd pistol round. The decider for the series was Overpass. NRG started out 2–0 on their T side, but they ended up not getting much more than that due to some key holds from François "AmaNEk" Delauney and the half ended up 12–3, favouring G2. Despite an effort from NRG in the second half, G2 ended up closing out the series and claiming a spot in the Grand Finals.

The second semifinal match was between Team Liquid, the #1 team in the world at that time, going up against the up-and-coming international roster of Mousesports. Mousesports started out Overpass by chaining some rounds off the back of Finn "karrigan" Andersen's quad-kill on the CT-side. However, Team Liquid would eventually run away with a dominant 10–5 T-half, which included a last second knife kill on the defuser on the last round by Nicholas "nitr0" Cannella. The North American side ended up closing out their map pick quite comfortably at a 16–8 score line. On Nuke, Liquid looked poised to close out the series with a 12–3 CT half, but Mousesports ended up draggin the map to Overtime off of an impressive performance from Özgür "woxic" Eker who managed to keep Mouz in contention with a quad kill. Despite his efforts, Liquid won the map and match in overtime, and advanced to the finals to face G2.

Semifinal Matches
| Team | Score | Map | Score | Team |
|---|---|---|---|---|
| NRG Esports | 12 | Dust II | 16 | G2 Esports |
| NRG Esports | 16 | Train | 7 | G2 Esports |
| NRG Esports | 10 | Overpass | 16 | G2 Esports |
| mousesports | 8 | Overpass | 16 | Team Liquid |
| mousesports | 17 | Nuke | 19 | Team Liquid |
| mousesports | – | Inferno | – | Team Liquid |

==== Finals ====
Semifinal Matches
| Team | Score | Map | Score | Team |
|---|---|---|---|---|
| G2 Esports | 15 | Dust II | 19 | Team Liquid |
| G2 Esports | 3 | Overpass | 16 | Team Liquid |
| G2 Esports | 16 | Nuke | 12 | Team Liquid |
| G2 Esports | 22 | Inferno | 25 | Team Liquid |
| G2 Esports | – | Vertigo | – | Team Liquid |

=== Finals standings ===
Between the end of the regular season and the Finals, a few changes took place.

FaZe Clan replace Dauren "AdreN" Kystaubayev, who was with FaZe on a trial basis, with legendary Virtus.pro player Filip "NEO" Kubski.

TyLoo release Kevin "xccurate" Susanto from the team and acquire Wing Hei "Freeman" Cheung from ViCi Gaming. TyLoo also signed free agent Zhenghao "DANK1NG" Lv as a sixth player.

compLexity Gaming released Peter "stanislaw" Jarguz from the team. NRG Esports then signed stanislaw to replace Damian "daps" Steele. However, under ESL rules, stanislaw is not able to participate in the Finals since he playing for compLexity during the season, so NRG was forced to use daps for the Finals.

| Place | Team | Prize Money |
|---|---|---|
| 1st | Team Liquid | US$250,000 |
| 2nd | G2 Esports | US$110,000 |
| 3rd–4th | mousesports | US$55,000 |
| 3rd–4th | NRG Esports | US$55,000 |
| 5th–6th | Astralis | US$32,000 |
| 5th–6th | FaZe Clan | US$32,000 |
| 7th–8th | Heroic | US$24,000 |
| 7th–8th | MIBR | US$24,000 |
| 9th–12th | Cloud9 | US$22,000 |
| 9th–12th | Fnatic | US$22,000 |
| 9th–12th | HellRaisers | US$22,000 |
| 9th–12th | North | US$22,000 |
| 13th–16th | DETONA Gaming | US$20,000 |
| 13th–16th | Grayhound Gaming | US$20,000 |
| 13th–16th | Luminosity Gaming | US$20,000 |
| 13th–16th | TyLoo | US$20,000 |
