= Nexon Arena =

2013–2020 e-sports stadium in South Korea

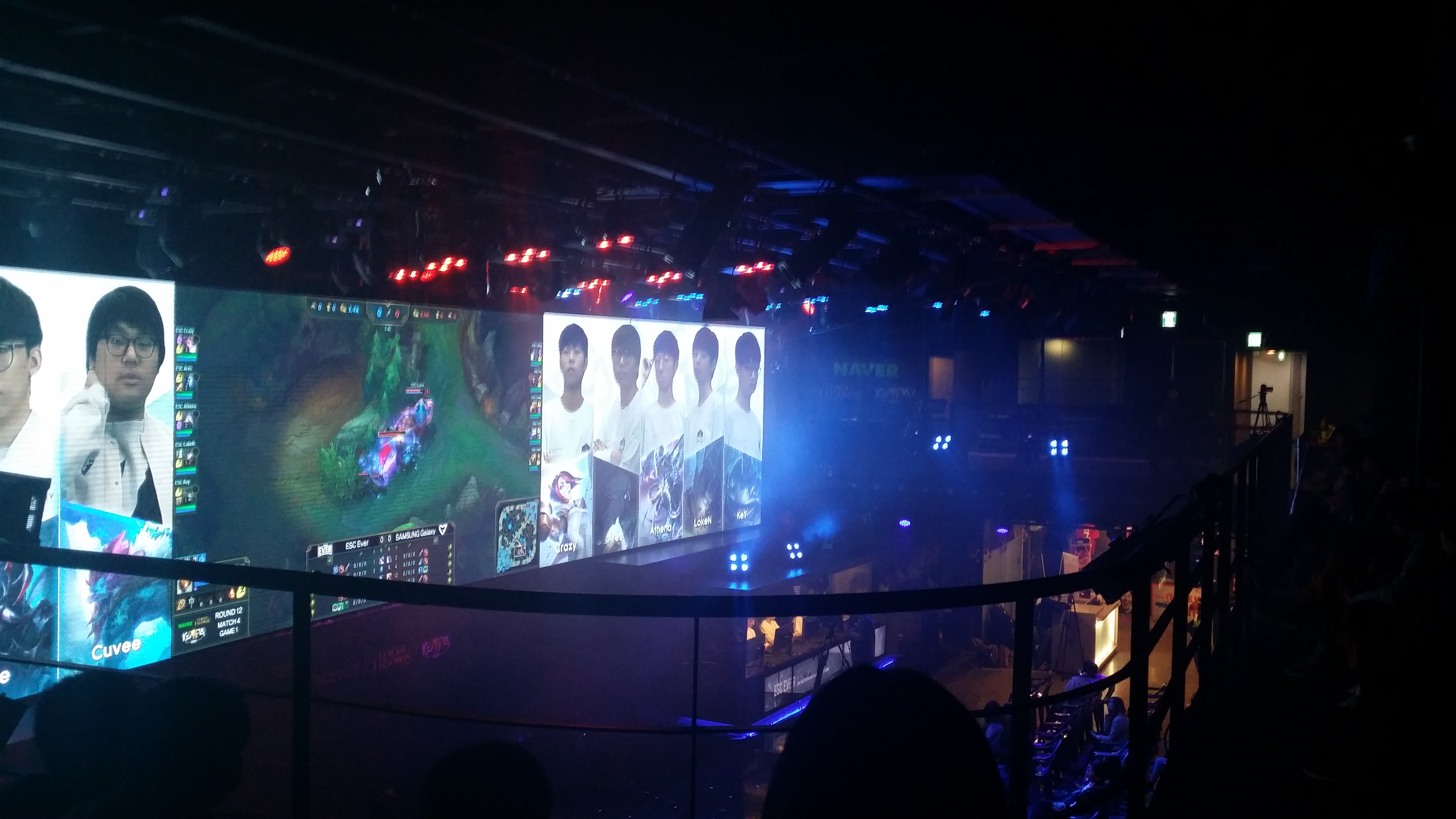
- Interior view of Nexon Arena in 2015
- Interactive map of Nexon Arena
- Location: 54 Seocho-daero 77-gil, Seocho 4(sa)-dong, Seocho-gu, Seoul, South Korea
- Coordinates: 37.502573°N 127.024747°E
- Owner: Nexon
- Capacity: 436
- Type: eSports

Construction
- Opened: December 2013
- Closed: July 31, 2020

Website
- Official Site

The Nexon Arena (Korean: 넥슨 아레나) was a dedicated eSports stadium in Seoul, South Korea that hosted events for StarCraft II, League of Legends, and other games. It was founded in December 2013. It was owned by Nexon, a South Korean game development company. SPOTV was the main broadcaster at the stadium. The stadium was closed on July 31, 2020.

== History ==
The Nexon Arena was located in the Gangnam area of Seoul and had an area of 1,683m2 and a seating capacity of over 400 people. The stadium had a stage with five-person and single-person sound proof booths where the players played while the game was shown on a large screen above the main stage. Events were generally free and open to the public.

The Nexon Arena first opened in late 2013 and was the first dedicated eSports stadium built by a game developer. After the conclusion of the 2013 FIFA Online 3 league, it was announced that the Nexon Arena would be opening, featuring events for StarCraft II and FIFA Online 3. In 2014, OnGameNet transferred broadcasting rights of Proleague to SPOTV and it was broadcast with the Adidas Championship as the first leagues to be played at the new studio.

Dota 2 was added to KeSPA's supported eSports in 2014 and thus the Korean Dota 2 League was created. Four seasons were played and broadcast from the Nexon Arena.

In 2015, the StarCraft II StarLeague was created as the second individual StarCraft II league in Korea with events being broadcast from the stadium Later that year, the International eSports Federation held the E-Sports World Championship 2015 in Korea and used the Nexon Arena as the main venue for the events. A retirement ceremony was also held a few weeks later for Lee "Flash" Young-ho, one of the most popular StarCraft Terran players, when he announced that he would be ending his progaming career.

After obtaining rights to broadcast League of Legends in 2016, games of League of Legends Champions Korea were played and broadcast from the Nexon Arena. KeSPA announced at the end of the 2016 season of Proleague that the league would be discontinued, ending the broadcasts and leaving the StarCraft II StarLeague the lone StarCraft event broadcast at the Nexon Arena.

In 2018, Nexon Arena was chosen as the South Korean venue for the Hearthstone Championship Tour.

It closed on July 31, 2020.
