= StarCraft II Proleague =

2003–2016 South Korean esports league

StarCraft Proleague
- Sport: StarCraft, StarCraft II
- Founded: 2003
- Folded: 2016
- Country: South Korea
- Continent: Asia
- Last champion: Jin Air Green Wings
- Most titles: SK Telecom T1
- Website: Proleague Official Page (Korean)

StarCraft Proleague, also known as StarCraft II Proleague or Proleague for short, was the longest running StarCraft league in the world and the most prestigious team league. Hosted by the Korean eSports Association (KeSPA), the league was played offline in South Korea. Proleague began in 2003 with the game StarCraft: Brood War before switching over to StarCraft II in 2012 and then discontinued in 2016. It was broadcast by SPOTVGames prior to being discontinued.

== History ==
In 2003, the game broadcasting company MBCGame created the KPGA Team League, the first major team league in StarCraft professional competition. MBCGame's competitor, OnGameNet created their own team league in response and so two major team leagues were active in the early 2000s.

In 2005, KeSPA merged the two team leagues to create the Proleague, a unified league. SK Telecom T1 swept the first two rounds of the newly formed league and ended up winning the grand finals as well to be the first champion. From its inception, the Proleague format had the teams alternate between 1vs1 and 2vs2 games in a best of five or best of seven match. However, the 2vs2 matches were discontinued in 2008, leaving only 1vs1 games. After the 2008 season, the format of Proleague changed again to span a longer portion of the year, typically starting from the end of one year and ending in the Fall of the next. The 2009 – 2010 season led to the creation of the modern Proleague format where teams face off each other in four or five rounds of round robin. At the end of the season, the highest scoring teams face off in a single-elimination playoffs bracket to determine the champion.

Prior to the release of StarCraft II in 2010, Blizzard Entertainment, disputed with KeSPA over intellectual property rights of broadcasting StarCraft games. This put pressure on KeSPA and in 2011 the case was resolved with an eSports commentator noting that the case was a push to expand the broadcasting market into StarCraft II. The 2011 – 2012 Proleague ended up being a transitional season for the league as featured both Brood War and Wings of Liberty. Each match was played alternating between Brood War and Wings of Liberty, with each player having to prepare for both games as well. Following the closure of MBCGame in 2012, SPOTVGames broadcast Proleague alongside OnGameNet.

The full transition into StarCraft II came into place for the 2012 – 2013 season which also featured EG-TL, a partnership between rivals Team Liquid and Evil Geniuses which made them the first non-Korean team to play in Proleague. EG-TL did not achieve much success in Proleague and ultimately pulled out of the league in the following season. OnGameNet stopped broadcasting Proleague starting the 2013 – 2014 season, leaving SPOTVGames as the sole broadcaster for the league.

KeSPA announced on October 18, 2016, that Proleague would be discontinued citing sponsorship issues, declining amount of professional teams, and match fixing scandals.

== Tournaments ==
=== OnGameNet and MBCGame Leagues ===
MBCGame hosted their first major team league in 2003.

Year	Name of Tournament	Winner	Result of Final	Runner-up
2003	2003 KeMongSa KPGA Tour Team League	Suma GO	3–1	STX SouL
2003	2003 LifeZone KPGA Team League	Suma GO	3–2	Hanbit Stars
2003–2004	2003–2004 LG IBM MBC Team League	SK Telecom T1	3–2	KTF MagicNs
2004	2004 Tucsan MBCGame Team League I	SK Telecom T1	4–3	Suma GO
2004	2004 Tucsan MBCGame Team League II	SK Telecom T1	4–3	Suma GO
2004–2005	2004–2005 MBCMovies MBCGame Team League	Suma GO	3–2	WeMade FOX

OnGameNet also hosted their own team competitions in 2003 and 2004.

Year	Name of Tournament	Winner	Result of Final	Runner-up
2003	2003 KTF EVER Cup	SK Telecom T1	3–0	Woongjin Stars
2003	2003 Neowiz Pmang Cup	Suma GO	3–0	Pantech EX
2004	2004 SKY Proleague Grand Final	Hanbit Stars	4–2	Pantech & Curitel Curriors

=== United League ===
OnGameNet and MBCGame came together to host Proleague starting in 2005.

Year	Name of Tournament	Winner	Result of Final	Runner-up
2005	SKY Proleague Grand Final	SK Telecom T1	4–2	KTF MagicNs
2006	SKY Proleague Grand Final	MBCGame HERO	4–3	Pantech EX
2007	2007 Shinhan Proleague Grand Final	Lecaf OZ	4–2	Samsung KHAN
2008	Shinhan Bank Proleague	Samsung KHAN	4–1	Hite SPARKYZ
2008–2009	Shinhan Bank Proleague	SK Telecom T1	2–0	Hwaseung OZ
2009–2010	Shinhan Bank Proleague	KT Rolster	4–2	SK Telecom T1
2010–2011	Shinhan Bank Proleague	KT Rolster	4–3	SK Telecom T1
2011–2012	SK Planet Proleague Season 1	SK Telecom T1	4–3	KT Rolster

=== Hybrid League ===
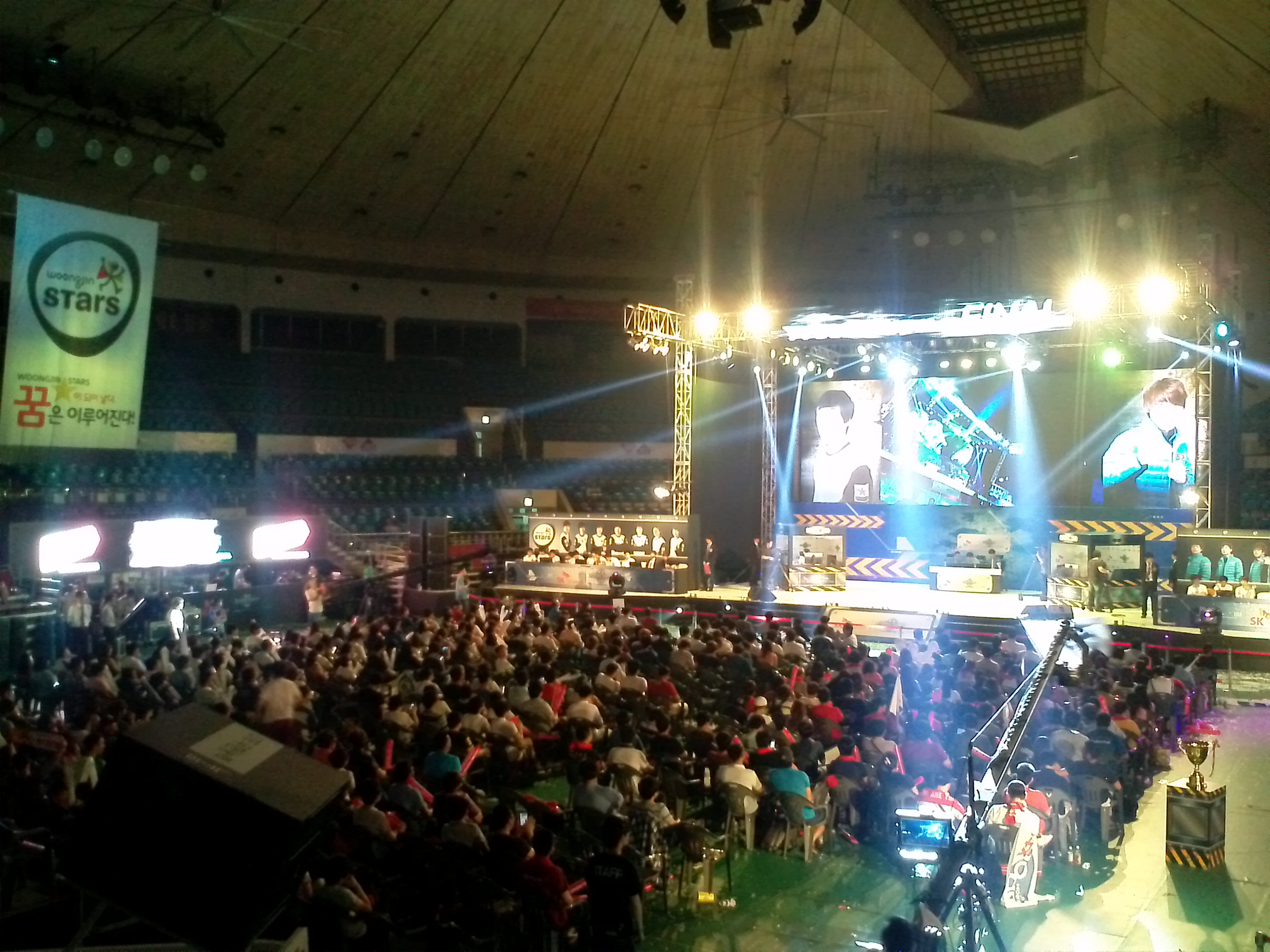
StarCraft II Proleague Season 2 grand final at the Jamsil Students' Gymnasium

Prior to the switch to StarCraft II, the 2012 SK Planet Proleague Season 2 league featured both games.

Year	Name of Tournament	Winner	Result of Final	Runner-up
2012	SK Planet Proleague Season 2	CJ Entus	2–0	Samsung KHAN

=== StarCraft II Leagues ===
Proleague fully switched to StarCraft II starting with the 2012 – 2013 season.

Year	Name of Tournament	Winner	Result of Final	Runner-up
2012–2013	2012 – 2013 SK Planet Proleague	STX SouL	4–2	Woongjin Stars
2013–2014	2014 SK Telecom Proleague	KT Rolster	4–2	SK Telecom T1
2014–2015	2015 SK Telecom Proleague	SK Telecom T1	4–2	Jin Air Green Wings
2016	2016 SK Telecom Proleague	Jin Air Green Wings	4–0	KT Rolster

== Teams ==
For the 2016 season, the final season, there were 7 teams in Proleague.

- CJ Entus
- Jin Air Green Wings
- KT Rolster
- MVP (Korean)
- Samsung Galaxy
- Afreeca Freecs (Korean)
- SK Telecom T1

== Prize Pool ==
The prize pool for the grand finals of the 2014 – 2015 Proleague season was a total of 70,000,000 KRW. In addition, each round had its own separate prize pool and additional awards were given out to outstanding players.

Place	Amount (KRW)
1st	50,000,000
2nd	20,000,000

== See also ==
- eSports
- Professional StarCraft competition
- KeSPA
- OnGameNet
- MBCGame
- SPOTV
