= Forg1ven =

Greek esports player

FORG1VEN
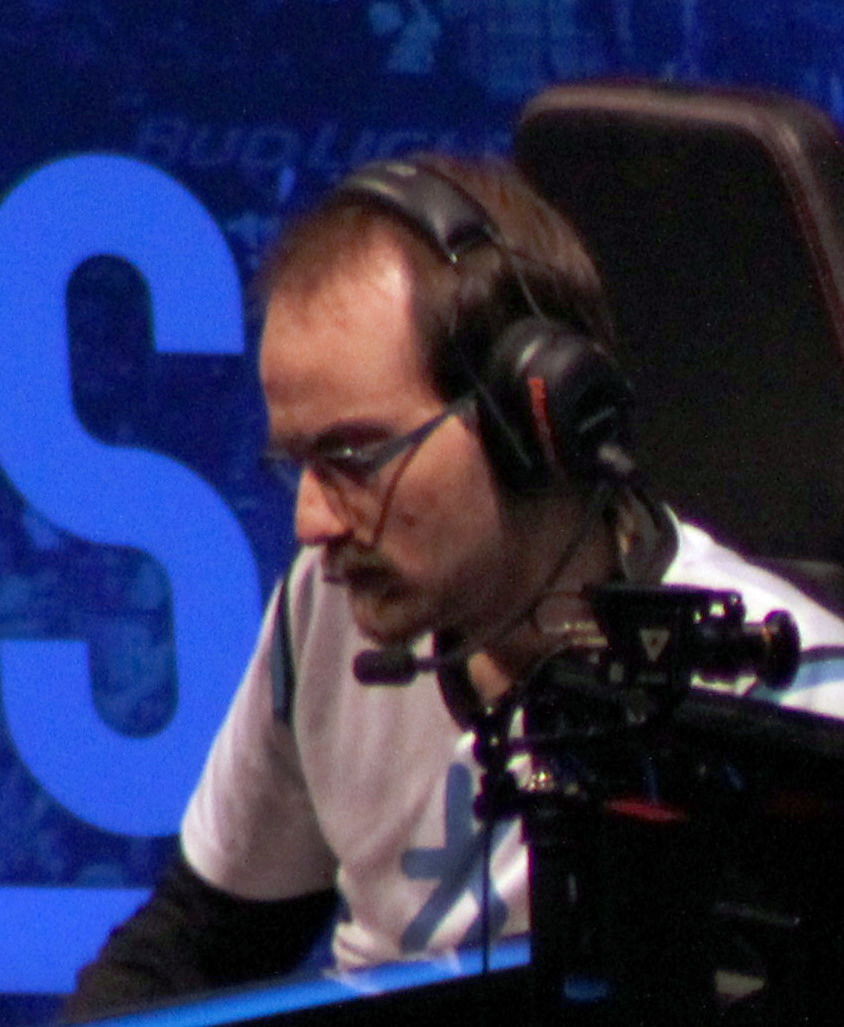
- Tzortziou in 2016

Personal information
- Name: Κωνσταντίνος-Ναπολέων Τζωρτζίου (Konstantinos-Napoleon Tzortziou)
- Born: 1992 (age 33–34)
- Nationality: Greek

Career information
- Game: League of Legends
- Playing career: 2013–2020
- Role: AD Carry/Marksman

Team history
- 2013: Mad Gods Gaming
- 2013–2014: Copenhagen Wolves
- 2014: Different Dimension
- 2014–2015: SK Gaming
- 2015: Gambit Gaming
- 2015–2016: H2k-Gaming
- 2016: Origen
- 2016: H2k-Gaming
- 2017: Different Dimension
- 2018: Origen
- 2019–2020: FC Schalke 04 Esports

Career highlights and awards
- EU LCS Most Valuable Player x1 (Spring 2015); EU LCS All-Pro Team ADC x1 (Spring 2015); EU LCS 2nd All-Pro Team ADC x2 (Spring 2014, Spring 2016)

Konstantinos-Napoleon Tzortziou (Greek: Κωνσταντίνος-Ναπολέων Τζωρτζίου), better known by his in-game name FORG1VEN, is a Greek retired professional League of Legends player. He played as an AD Carry for Intrepid Fox Gaming. He earlier played for Copenhagen Wolves, SK Gaming, Gambit Gaming, H2k-Gaming, Origen, and Schalke 04.

FORG1VEN was considered to be among the best Western players of the AD Carry/Marksman role in League history, and one of the game's most mechanically skilled players. He was the MVP of the 2015 Spring EU LCS and a semifinalist of the 2016 World Championship.

He hails from the town of Prosotsani, but has lived in Kavala for most of his life.

FORG1VEN was also the captain of the Greek national Counter-Strike team in 2012.

== Career ==
=== Copenhagen Wolves ===
From 2013 to 2015 FORG1VEN played with the Copenhagen Wolves.

=== SK Gaming ===
In spring 2015, FORG1VEN played for SK Gaming, then the top European team for most of that season. He established several statistical records and was the MVP of the 2015 Spring EU LCS Split while a member of SK. However, after claims of mismanagement and worsening relations with teammates, he was replaced on the active roster by Adrian "CandyPanda" Wübbelmann.

=== Gambit Gaming ===
FORG1VEN requested a transfer and left SK Gaming before the start of the 2015 Summer European LCS split becoming Gambit Gaming's star. His play for Gambit led them to a 7–9 record and into a three-way tie for the last playoff spot. However, he was suspended by Riot Games for four competitive games in July 2015 for "toxic behavior" in public competitive play, receiving a harsher penalty because of an April 2014 incident in which he was fined for similar behaviour. The ban hurt Gambit Gaming, which was unable to secure visas for its preferred replacement quickly enough and used Moopz as a replacement for their last two (losing) games of the regular season. On 24 August 2015, Gambit Gaming replaced FORG1VEN as AD Carry for the 2016 EU LCS Spring Promotion with Kristoffer "P1noy" Albao Lund Pedersen.

=== H2k-Gaming ===
Gambit Gaming subsequently sold its spot in the LCS to Team Vitality, and FORG1VEN received offers from other LCS teams before joining H2k-Gaming. On 25 February 2016, Tzortziou announced that he would miss the remainder of the 2016 Spring EU LCS split, for which H2k was then in a tie for first, as well as the 2016 Summer EU LCS and the 2016 World Championship in order to fulfill Greek military service requirements. However, after talks with the Greek government, on March 3 H2k announced that FORG1VEN had been given a temporary service deferment.

According to former H2k teammate Jankos, even though FORG1VEN was a skilled player with good mechanics, he took losses against teams with players he considered inferior, such as Rekkles and negatively impacted the squad's teamwork by blaming his teammates. In April 2016, FORG1VEN left H2k. He initially said that he would not play the upcoming summer split, and planned to return in the 2017 Spring EU split.

=== Origen ===
FORG1VEN joined Origen in May 2016 for that year's Summer EU LCS, but his individualistic, communication-heavy playstyle clashed with fellow star player Glenn "Hybrid" Doornenbal's team-oriented style, which led to poor results for Origen in the first week. On June 7, FORG1VEN announced that he was planning to stop playing League of Legends because of a lack of motivation and a preference for playing Overwatch. He characterized his experience with Origen management as a "breach of trust". On 8 June 2016, FORG1VEN was removed from the Origen active roster, and inability to find a replacement for FORG1VEN prompted team owner and former player XPeke to step into his role.

=== Return to H2k-Gaming ===
In July 2016, FORG1VEN returned to H2k-Gaming as a substitute. He made the starting roster for the final week of the season due to Aleš "Freeze" Kněžínek's wrist injury.

FORG1VEN played for H2k-Gaming at the 2016 League of Legends World Championship, and was one of the top players at the tournament. They were placed in Group C and took 1st place after defeating Chinese champions Edward Gaming in a tiebreaker, qualifying to the quarterfinals. At the quarterfinals, they swept Albus NoX Luna, the LoL Continental League champions, 3 – 0. The team was eliminated by Samsung Galaxy 3–0 in the semifinals.

=== Return to Different Dimension ===
On 31 March 2017, Different Dimension announced the return of FORG1VEN as their Marksman. They participated in the LoL Greek Championship Season 2, finishing 4th in the regular season with 10 wins and 4 losses, qualifying for the playoffs. There, they beat Team Arsenal 3–0 in the quarterfinals, lost to eventual champions Greek Regenesis 3–1 in the semifinals, and lost to defending champions Instinct Esports 2–0 in the third place match, finishing 4th overall.

During FORG1VEN's stint, the team also participated in the ESL South East Europe Championship Season 5. After sweeping the group stage by winning all 5 games, they qualified to the LAN finals in Bulgaria. There, 2 consecutive 2–0 sweeps, first against Serbian team Instinct eSports in the semifinals and then again against Bulgarian team GPlay.bg in the final, crowned Different Dimension as the winners, without losing a single game.

=== WLGaming ===
Shortly after the end of LoL Greek Championship Season 2, WLGaming announced FORG1VEN as part of their roster for the GameAthlon 4 LAN tournament. They won the tournament, defeating Panathinaikos eSports 2–1 in the final.

=== Return to Origen ===
FORG1VEN rejoined Origen to participate in the newly founded EU Masters competition in 2018. Despite losing their first game in the tournament, Origen recovered and were crowned champions after sweeping IlluminaR Gaming 3–0 at the grand final in Leicester.

=== Schalke 04 ===
On 9 November 2019, he became the starting AD Carry of Schalke 04 for 2020 after completing his mandatory military service in Greece in April 2019.

== Tournament results ==
=== Copenhagen Wolves ===
- 1st — Riot Turkey International Invitational Tournament 2
- 1st — ASUS ROG Paris Games Week 2013
- 1st — IEM Season 8 Cologne Amateur tournament
- Won — 2014 EU LCS Spring promotion tournament
- 6th — 2014 EU LCS Spring season
- 6th — 2014 EU LCS Spring playoffs
- Won — 2014 EU LCS Summer promotion tournament

=== Different Dimension ===
- 3rd — ESL Euro Series 2014 Spring
- 1st — Riot Greek Legends 2014
- 1st — ESL South East Europe Championship Season 5

=== SK Gaming ===
- 5th/6th — IEM Season 9 World Championship
- 1st — 2015 EU LCS Spring season
- 4th — 2015 EU LCS Spring playoffs

=== Gambit Gaming ===
- 8th — 2015 Summer EU LCS

=== H2k Gaming ===
- 3rd/4th — IEM Season 10 Cologne
- 2nd — 2016 Spring EU LCS season
- 4th — 2016 Spring EU LCS playoffs
- 4th — 2016 Summer EU LCS season
- 3rd — 2016 Summer EU LCS playoffs
- 3rd/4th — 2016 League of Legends World Championship

=== Origen ===
- ? – 2016 Summer EU LCS (left after first week of season)
- 1st – 2018 European Masters Spring

=== Intrepid Fox Gaming ===
- 1st – eGaming 2021 at the Thessaloniki International Fair
