= Freeze (gamer) =

Czech professional League of Legends player

Personal information
- Name: Aleš Kněžížek
- Born: 1993 or 1994 (age 31–32)
- Nationality: Czech

Current team
- Team: 100 Thieves
- Role: Assistant coach
- League: LCS

Career information
- Playing career: 2012–2020
- Coaching career: 2020–present

Team history

As player:
- 2012–2013: eXtatus
- 2013: Samurai in Jeans (Note: Previously known as Esport4Life)
- 2013: Heimerdinger's Colossi
- 2013–2014: Ninjas in Pyjamas
- 2014–2015: Copenhagen Wolves
- 2016: Renegades
- 2016: H2k-Gaming
- 2016–2017: Tempo Storm
- 2017–2018: Inside Games
- 2018: Royal Bandits
- 2019: Splyce Vipers
- 2019–2020: MAD Lions
- 2020: Ad Hoc Gaming

As coach:
- 2020–present: 100 Thieves

Aleš Kněžínek, better known by his in-game name Freeze, is a Czech former professional League of Legends player and was the current Assistant Coach for 100 Thieves. He has also played for Renegades, H2k-Gaming, Copenhagen Wolves, and Ninjas in Pyjamas. He was the first Czech national to play in the LCS.

== Career ==
With Ninjas in Pyjamas, Kněžínek began his LCS career during the summer split of season 3. By the end of the split, the team finished the regular season in 5th place, making it to the playoffs, where they finished 6th overall. This lead Ninjas in Pyjamas to be relegated to the challenger series, where Kněžínek would stay for the whole duration of season 4, before later leaving the disbanding NiP. Kněžížek was then picked up by the Copenhagen Wolves before the start of season 5 spring split, where he and the team finished 6th. In the summer split of season 5, the Copenhagen Wolves were much less successful, finishing in last place, forcing them to be auto-relegated. Meaning Kněžínek's contract expired and he announced his free agency on November 1, 2015. He was picked up by North American team Renegades on January 6, where he is currently playing the season 6 spring split. Renagades finished 8th in the LCS, and Kněžínek left the team after the disappointing finish.

He joined H2k on May 8, 2016, ahead of the EU LCS Summer 2016 split, replacing FORG1VEN at AD Carry as the latter was conscripted into the Greek Army. However, FORG1VEN later had his military service commuted, and transferred to Origen.

On July 27, 2016, H2k announced that Kněžínek would step away from the roster due to persistent tendonitis. The team stated that FORG1VEN would take his place on the starting roster. Signed by Tempo Storm in December 2016.

In 2020, Kněžínek stepped away from competitive play and signed with 100 Thieves as an assistant coach.

With the help of Kněžínek's coaching abilities, 100 Thieves became a title contender, which they've successfully accomplished during the 2021 LCS Summer split. 100 Thieves didn't change the roster even after struggling during the 2021 Worlds championship, finishing 3-3 in group stage.

Kněžínek became the head coach of the 2022 100 Thieves roster and despite tough losses in finals of both spring and summer split, the team had consistent results and great performances.

After another disappointing Worlds championship performance, Kněžínek signed a contract with Evil geniuses.

After struggling through the spring split of LCS's 2023 season, Evil geniuses managed to reach semifinals in the playoffs. But losing 0-3 to Golden Guardians destroyed any hopes of playing MSI 2023. Aleš Kněžínek left the team soon after spring season ended.

== Tournament results ==
=== 2013 ===
2013
Date	Event	Placement	Final game
2013-06-01	SCAN & NVIDIA EUW Invitational	1	Heimerdinger's Colossi 3 : 0 Eternity Gaming
2013-04-25	SoloMid EU Invitational 4	1	Samurai in Jeans 2 : 0 AT Gaming
2013-04-09	SoloMid EU Invitational 3	2	Samurai in Jeans 1 : 2 MeetYourMakers

=== 2014 ===
2014
Date	Event	Placement	Final game
2014-08-07	2014 EU Challenger Summer Series Playoffs	4	Ninjas in Pyjamas 0 : 3 Unicorns Of Love
2014-06-16	DreamHack Summer 2014	1	Ninjas in Pyjamas 2 : 0 Reason Gaming
2014-05-19	Solomid EU Tournament Circuit/Invitational 6	1	Ninjas in Pyjamas 3 : 0 Gamers2
2014-05-07	Solomid EU Tournament Circuit/Invitational 5	1	Rest In Pepperonis 3 : 1 Gamers2
2014-04-19	Copenhagen Games 2014	1	Ninjas in Pyjamas 2 : 0 Cloud9 Eclipse
2014-04-11	2014 EU Challenger Series Playoffs	2	Ninjas in Pyjamas 1 : 3 Cloud9 Eclipse
2014-02-02	FACEIT Challenger Invitational	1	Ninjas in Pyjamas 2 : 0 SK Gaming Prime

=== Ninjas in Pyjamas ===
- 1st — DreamHack Summer 2014 (17 June 2014)

=== Copenhagen Wolves ===
- 6th — 2015 Spring EU LCS
- 10th — 2015 Summer EU LCS

=== Renagades ===
- 8th — 2016 Spring NA LCS

=== H2k-Gaming ===
- 4th — 2016 Summer EU LCS
