= Korea e-Sports Association =

South Korean body

- Formation: 2000
- Type: NGO
- Purpose: Manage esports in South Korea
- Location: Jung-gu, Seoul
- Region served: South Korea
- Members: 11 member corporations
- Official language: Korean, English
- Chief Executive: Jeon Byeong-heon
- Main organ: General Committee
- Parent organization: Ministry of Culture, Sports and Tourism
- Affiliations: Korean Olympic Committee; International e-Sports Federation
- Website: e-sports.or.kr

The Korea e-Sports Association (KeSPA) is a South Korean organization established to oversee, regulate, and promote esports in South Korea. It is a member of the Korean Olympic Committee and the International e-Sports Federation. As of June 2012, it was the managing body for 25 e-sports in the country, including Starcraft II: Legacy of the Void (excluded in 2016), League of Legends, Dota 2, and Counter-Strike: Global Offensive. KeSPA also hosts the KeSPA Cup, a yearly tournament event for some of their games.

== History ==
=== The early years of KeSPA ===
KeSPA was founded in 2000 after the approval of the Ministry of Culture, Sports and Tourism. Its official goal is to make esports an official sporting event, and to solidify the commercial position of esports in all sectors. The organization manages the broadcasting of e-Sports, the formation of new events, and the conditions in which pro gamers work, as well as encourage the playing of video games by the general population. In 2008 SK Telecom was given the leading position on its board, effectively making Seo Jin-woo the organization's president. KeSPA regulates broadcasting by e-sports television channels such as Ongamenet, MBC Game, GOMtv, and Pandora TV, as well as 23 e-sports journalists and over twelve e-sports teams. Additionally, they have created a rankings system.

On May 11, 2012, after a slew of announcements from KeSPA regarding the transition between StarCraft: Brood War and StarCraft II, it was announced that they would be partnering with Major League Gaming, a US-based esports organization to send KeSPA players to MLG events.

On October 27, 2014, KeSPA, alongside Riot Games and Ongamenet, issued a press release stating new policies directed toward the welfare Korean professional esports players. Some of the major changes include a minimum salary for professional esports players that is competitive with popular traditional sports, and setting a 1-year minimum for contracts between players and teams starting in the 2016 season. There were also many League of Legends specific changes that include limiting companies to have a minimum of one team with 10 players per team, and beginning a shift from tournament to league format for Korean Worlds qualifiers.

A 2016 article in ESPN said that KeSPA reported that it would shut down its Starcraft ProLeague. The article said that KeSPA chairman, Jun Byung-hun, said that they were shutting down their Starcraft ProLeague due to fewer ProLeagues and players, problems getting sponsorships and problems with match-fixing.

=== 2008 intellectual property dispute with Blizzard ===
In 2008, a slump in the distribution of e-Sports media was caused in part by the fear that video game developer Blizzard Entertainment would demand royalties from KeSPA, because of their intellectual property rights. In 2010, Blizzard Entertainment announced that negotiations were going poorly, and that they would only allow GomTV to broadcast Blizzard games. KeSPA responded saying that they will challenge Blizzard's intellectual property rights. However, soon after, MBC Game, a gaming television station, announced that they will negotiate with GOMtv, which Newhua news speculated would lessen KeSPA's power.

In May 2011, the dispute was finally settled, allowing Ongamenet (OGN) and Munhwa Broadcasting Corporation (MBC) to officially broadcast Brood War games.

=== 2010 match-fixing ===
In April 2010, eleven Starcraft players were implicated for match-fixing during the 2009 e-Sports season. The Sanction Subcommittee of KeSPA banned them from playing e-Sports in the future, and those implicated are due to be charged in criminal courts by KeSPA, as well as professional gaming teams. Along with progamers, the owners of over twelve illegal gambling websites, and former players and staff members will be charged. It is alleged that players were bribed to leak information, or lose games, allowing owners of the illegal gambling site to obtain huge profits. There was an outcry in Korea following these developments.

=== 2015 match-fixing ===
A 2016 article in Kotaku said that two KeSPA players, Lee "Life" Seung-hyun and Jung "Bbyong" Woo-yong, were indicted for match-fixing along with seven other people. The article said that "Life" who was one of the most dominant StarCraft II players in the world was charged with receiving 70,000,000 won (about US$62,000) for intentionally losing two KeSPA Cup matches in 2015.

A 2016 article in Kotaku said that the tournament where "Bbyong" intentionally lost a match was GSL Season 1 in 2015.

=== 2026 Esports Nations Cup controversy ===
In April 2026, it was reported in Seoul Sport that the Esports Foundation, the organizers of the Esports Nations Cup, was attempting to force players into some of South Korea's rosters for the multi-title, nation-focused event scheduled to be held in Riyadh, Saudi Arabia in November. KeSPA was appointed as South Korea's "National Team Partner" for the Esports Nations Cup in March 2026, giving them rights to select each title's coaches and rosters that would represent the country. KeSPA would argue that the moves were "incompatible" with the already existing selection processes for rosters like it had done with the Asian Games, with the Korean Sport & Olympic Committee (KSOC) also stating that South Korea's national representatives could only be selected by official means. Ultimately, the Esports Foundation would not move forward with KeSPA as South Korea's National Team Partner.

== Notable teams ==
- CJ Entus
- KT Rolster
- Samsung Galaxy
- SK Telecom T1
- DRX

== See also ==
- Professional StarCraft competition
