= GBM =

GBM may refer to:

== Medicine ==
- Glioblastoma multiforme, an outdated term for glioblastoma
- Glomerular basement membrane

== Science and technology ==
- Gateway belief model, a model in psychology and the communication sciences
- Geometric Brownian motion, continuous stochastic process where the logarithm of a variable follows a Brownian movement, that is a Wiener process
- Gradient boosting, a machine learning technique
- Generic Buffer Management, a graphics API
- Gamma-ray Burst Monitor, aboard the Fermi Gamma-ray Space Telescope
- Game Boy Micro, a 2005 handheld game console and the last model in the Game Boy line

== Other uses ==
- Grand Besançon Métropole, a French intercommunal structure
- GBM (League of Legends player) (born 1994), Korean video gamer
- Geoffrey Bwalya Mwamba (born 1959), Zambian politician
- Garbaharey Airport, in Somalia
- Garhwali language
- Grand Bauhinia Medal, an honour of Hong Kong
- Greater Britain Movement, a short-lived far-right group
- Green Belt Movement, a Kenyan environmental organisation
