= Jin Air Green Wings =

South Korean esports organization (2011–2020)

- Short name: JAG
- Divisions: StarCraft II; League of Legends
- Founded: November 4, 2011
- Folded: November 30, 2020 (StarCraft II) December 2, 2020 (League of Legends)
- Location: South Korea
- Parent group: Jin Air

Jin Air Green Wings (Korean: 진에어 그린윙스) was a South Korean e-sports organization with teams competing in StarCraft II and League of Legends. Its parent organization was Korean Air subsidiary Jin Air. The organization was formed in November 2011 as a StarCraft: Brood War team, which combined three disbanding Proleague teams: Hwaesung Oz, WeMade FOX and MBCGame HERO. It was simply known as "The 8th Team" until Jin Air became its title sponsor in July 2013. Jin Air Green Wings was one of eight Korean e-Sports Association recognized teams participating in Proleague when it disbanded in late 2020.

== League of Legends ==
=== Final roster ===
Nat.	Name	ID	Role
(South Korea)	Lee Sang-wook	TaNa	Top Laner
(South Korea)	Kim Chan-hee	Seize	Jungler
(South Korea)	Eom Seong-hyeon	UmTi	Jungler
(South Korea)	Lee Chan-ju	Yaharong	Mid Laner
(South Korea)	Kwon Sun-ho	Light	Bot Laner
(South Korea)	Jeong Yong-seung	Rumor	Bot Laner
(South Korea)	Park Hee-seok	Senan	Support
(South Korea)	Cha Ji-hoon	Signature	Head coach
(South Korea)	Oh Ji-hwan	Raise	Coach
(South Korea)	Kim Dong-hyeon	Sensation	Coach

=== History ===
==== 2013 season ====
The Jin Air organization picked up the rosters of Eat Sleep Game and Hoon Good Day to form the Jin Air Green Wings Falcons and the Jin Air Green Wings Stealths respectively. Miso, Reapered, Raven, Roar and StarLast joined the Falcons and HooN, TrAce, ActScene, ŁØAÐ and IceBear joined the Stealths. Neither team managed to qualify for worlds.

==== 2014 season ====
A mixed Jin Air team participated at the SK Telecom LTE-A LoL Masters 2014 but they placed fifth in the regular season and missed playoffs. Neither the Stealths nor the Falcons managed to earn enough circuit points to qualify for the 2014 Season Korea Regional Finals so neither went to worlds.

==== 2015 season ====
Changes to the OGN rules forced both teams to merge to form the Jin Air Green Wings. The roster consisted of TrAce, Chaser, Winged, GBM, Pilot, Cpt Jack, Chei, and XD. They placed fourth in the regular season of SBENU Champions Spring 2015 and qualified for the playoffs. However, they lost in the first round 3–0 to CJ Entus and placed fourth for the season. Jin Air placed sixth in the regular season of SBENU eChampions Summer 2015 and gained 10 circuit points but missed the playoffs. They had enough circuit points to qualify for the 2015 Season Korea Regional Finals where they made it to the finals but lost 3–1 to KT Rolster and barely missed out on worlds.

GBM was left off of the roster for KeSPA Cup 2015 and ultimately joined NRG eSports. Jin Air played in the 2015 LoL KeSPA Cup where they lost 2–0 in the quarterfinals to CJ Entus.

Jin Air received an invitation to Intel Extreme Masters Season X - San Jose where they ended up finishing 5–8.

==== 2016 season ====
In December 2016, Pilot and Blanc joined PSG eSports.

==== 2019 season ====
Jin Air Greenwings had experienced a 15-series losing streak in Spring 2019. They broke their losing streak by taking the match from Afreeca Freecs on March 7, 2019, with a set score of 2–1. They ended up at the last place for the season, and had to go through Summer Promotion to play in the LCK. They successfully promoted back to the LCK by winning their last match in the 2019 LCK Summer Promotion with a set score of 3–1 against ES Sharks.

For the Summer season, they went through a 18-series losing streak. They only managed to win 4 games, without winning a single match. They had an overall of 1–35 record of their match in the 2019 season. They went through their second LCK promotion in the same year in order to play in the LCK again. However, they lost in the match against Hanwha Life Esports for the last spot of LCK, and was relegated to Challengers Korea.

==== 2020 season ====
Jin Air was announced as one of the short list of alternates for LCK franchising. On November 17, Jin Air announced that they had not been selected to participate in the LCK Franchised league and their League of Legends team would be disbanding.

== StarCraft II ==
Jang "Creator" Hyun-woo joined the team on November 17, 2015.

=== Final roster ===
ID	Name	Race
(South Korea) Creator	Jang Hyun Woo	Protoss
(South Korea) Maru	Cho Seong Ju	Terran
(South Korea) Rogue	Lee Byung Ryul	Zerg
(South Korea) sOs	Kim Yoo Jin	Protoss
(South Korea) Trap	Cho Sung Ho	Protoss
(Taiwan) Rex	Lei Hao Chen	Zerg

=== Former players ===
ID	Name	Race
(South Korea) Jaedong	Lee Jae dong	Zerg
(South Korea) Hyun	Ko Seok Hyun	Zerg
(South Korea) Cure	Kim Doh Wook	Terran
(South Korea) TY	Jeon Tae-yang	Terran

==== History ====
Jin Air Green Wings was one of the seven KeSPA-recognized teams participating in Proleague before its discontinuation in 2016 and was the only Proleague team that kept on playing Starcraft II after 2016. During its existence Jin Air Green Wings was one of the strongest Korean StarCraft II teams in no small part thanks to Kim "sOs" Yoo-jin, Cho "Maru" Seong-ju, Lee "Rogue" Byeong-yeol, Cho "Trap" Seong-ho & Jang "Creator" Hyun-woo. Between 2014-2020 Jin Air Green Wings won 9 Global StarCraft II League tournaments, 3 Intel Extreme Masters seasons and 2 StarCraft II World Championship Series finals, both being won by Kim "sOs" Yoo-jin.

On Nov 30, 2020, Jin Air officially disbanded their Starcraft 2 team along with their league of legends team due to not being accepted for League of Legends' LCK franchising.
