= KioShiMa =

French esports player

kioShiMa
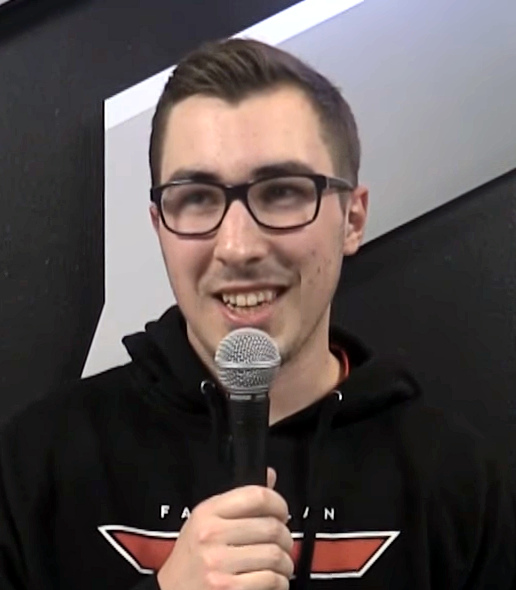
- Fiey in 2017

Personal information
- Name: Fabien Fiey
- Born: 26 July 1994 (age 32)
- Nationality: French

Career information
- Games: Counter-Strike: Global Offensive
- Role: Rifler (support)

Team history
- 2012–2013: In Your Head
- 2013–2014: Clan-Mystik
- 2014: Nameless
- 2014: Epsilon eSports
- 2014: Mercenary
- 2014–2015: Team LDLC.com
- 2015–2016: Team EnVyUs
- 2016–2017: FaZe Clan
- 2018: Team EnVyUs
- 2018: LeftOut
- 2018–2019: Cloud9
- 2019–2021: Heretics

Career highlights and awards
- 2× CS:GO Major champion (Jönköping 2014, Cluj-Napoca 2015); HLTV Top 20 Player of the Year (2014); 2x HLTV MVP

Fabien Fiey, better known by his in-game name kioShiMa, is a French professional Counter-Strike: Global Offensive and former Counter-Strike 1.6 player.

== Career ==
kioShiMa originates from a Counter-Strike 1.6 background, in which he made his first international appearance as a 17-year-old in his 3DMAX team at Electronic Sports World Cup 2011. His team, however, would crash out in the group stage following losses to each of their opponents; SK Gaming, Moscow Five, DTS Gaming as well as eSrael.

The following months would see him slowly climbing the tiers of French teams in the game. In early 2012, he would join two known players atLaNtis and mshz in e2g, and later WCG legends HaRts and ioRek in Bizounours. The team attended GameGune 2012 in July, but kioShiMa and his team did not again manage to make an impact and fell out of the tournament in 9-12th place. The release of Counter-Strike: Global Offensive followed soon after, and KioShiMa soon moved onto the new game, appearing in teams such as In Your Head and iGamerz.

In May 2013, he was re-scouted by HaRts to reunite the core of the Bz team under the Clan-Mystik banner, also featuring the now notorious KQLY as a new member. The team would eventually go to win Electronic Sports World Cup 2013, marking the first big international achievement in kioShiMa's career.

kioShiMa would leave the team, at that time known as Epsilon eSports, in September 2014 as the "French shuffle" began to take form. He formed a new team with former Titan members NBK, shox and SmithZz as well as Team LDLC.com captain Happy. The team was briefly known as Mercenary before being picked up by Happy former organization, who disbanded their former team due to showing disappointment at the former players' behavior in regards to their new contracts.

kioShiMa and his new Team LDLC.com would then dominate the scene in France and even became a contender for the title of the best team in the world versus Fnatic. The team would go on to win the last major of the year at DreamHack Winter 2014, as well as coming out on top at the MLG Aspen Invitational in early January.

To the surprise of many, the team would leave Team LDLC.com in February in preparation for a transfer to a new organization - soon be revealed as Team EnVyUs. Fiey was a member of the active line-up until which March 3, 2016 in the wake of the team's long slump. He was acquired by FaZe Clan a month later replacing the recently departed Maikelele. On August 20, 2017, kioShiMa was replaced by olofmeister on FaZe Clan. On February 3, 2018, after 6 months of inactivity, he returned to Team EnVyUs to replace xms. After 4 months of Playing for Team EnVyUs, team got disbanded. After Team disband 3 Players of Team EnVyUs (ScreaM, kioShiMa, hAdJi) created a new team named LeftOut, and they also added 2 Team EnVyUs former members (SIXER and xms). In October 2018 kioShiMa joined as a Stand-In for North American Team, Cloud9. Because of Skadoodle's retirement from Competitive CSGO, kioShiMa replaced Skadoodle in the Active Roster.

== Tournament results ==
Bold denotes a CS:GO Major

- 17-20th — ESWC 2011
- 1st — ESWC 2011
- 9-12th — **DreamHack Winter 2013**
- 9-12th — **EMS One Katowice 2014**
- 5-8th — **ESL One: Cologne 2014**
- 2nd — ESWC 2014

=== Team LDLC ===
- 1st — **DreamHack Winter 2014**
- 1st — MLG X Games Aspen Invitational

=== Team EnVyUs ===
- 3-4th — **ESL One Katowice 2015**
- 2nd — **ESL One Cologne 2015**
- 1st — **DreamHack Open Cluj-Napoca 2015**
- 11-12th — Intel Extreme Masters X - World Championship

=== FaZe Clan ===
- 9th – 12th — **ESL One Cologne 2016**
- 9th – 10th — ELeague Season 1
- 7th – 8th — ESL Pro League Season 4
- 3rd — IEM Oakland 2016
- 1st — ELEAGUE Major 2017 Main Qualifier
- 5th - 8th — **ELEAGUE Major 2017**
- 2nd — IEM Katowice 2017
- 1st — SL i-League StarSeries Season 3 Finals
- 3-4th — ESL One Cologne 2017
- 15 — 16th — **PGL 2017 Krakow Major Championship**
