= GBM (gamer) =

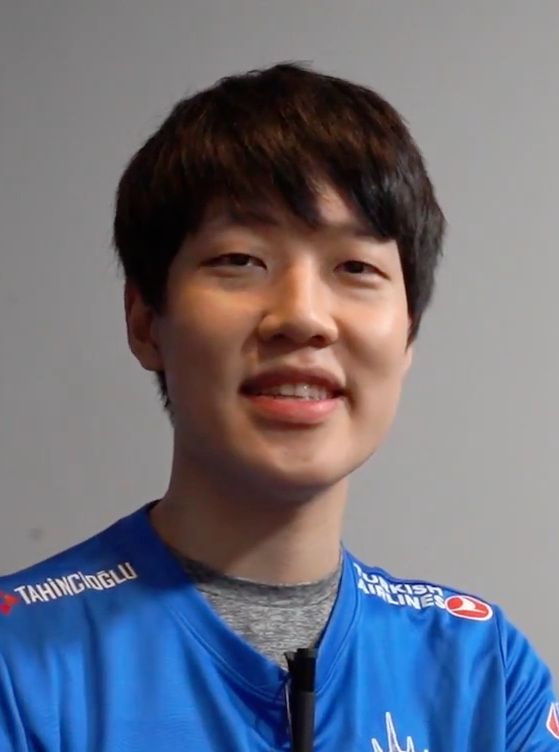
- GBM in 2018

Personal information
- Name: 이창석 (Lee Chang-seok)
- Nationality: South Korean

Career information
- Game: League of Legends
- Playing career: 2013–2019
- Role: Mid
- Coaching career: 2020

Team history

As player:
- 2013: n.Die Guts
- 2013–2014: CJ Entus Frost
- 2014: Jin Air Green Wings Falcons
- 2015: Jin Air Green Wings
- 2016: NRG Esports
- 2017: Team Vitality
- 2017: eUnited
- 2018: SuperMassive
- 2019: Royal Youth
- 2019: Galatasaray Esports

As coach:
- 2020: Griffin
- 2020: Papara SuperMassive

Career highlights and awards
- 2× TCL champion

Lee Chang-seok (Korean: 이창석), better known as GBM, is a South Korean former professional League of Legends player. He previously played for NRG Esports of the LCS, Team Vitality of the LEC, Jin Air Green Wings and CJ Entus of the LCK, and Galatasaray Esports of the Turkish Championship League (TCL).

== Playing career ==
=== 2013 season ===
GBM was picked up by CJ Entus Frost in June 2013 as a mid laner under the name "Ganked by Mom". He played in his first OGN with the team at HOT6iX Champions Summer 2013 and shared playing time with RapidStar. Frost ended the season in fourth after making it to the semifinals and then losing 3–0 to the KT Rolster Bullets and 3–2 to MVP Ozone. Frost earned enough circuit points to qualify for the Season 3 Korea Regional Finals but lost 3–0 in the second round to the Bullets. In the offseason, Frost attended IEM Singapore and made it to the finals but lost 2–0 to Invictus Gaming.

=== 2014 season ===
The new season started for GBM and Frost at PANDORA.TV Champions Winter 2013-2014 where they made it to the quarterfinals but lost 3–0 to Samsung Ozone. GBM left the team after the season to join the Jin Air Green Wings Falcons as their new mid laner. He played with the team for the first time at HOT6iX Champions Spring 2014 but the team failed to win a single game and fell out in the groups. They then went to HOT6iX Champions Summer 2014 but failed to make it past the group stages again. GBM left the team on September 12, 2014.

=== 2015 season ===
GBM rejoined the Jin Air Green Wings as the starting mid laner when the Falcons combined with the Jin Air Green Wings Stealths. Jin Air played in SBENU Champions Spring 2015 and made it to the playoffs but they faltered at the end of the season and lost 3–0 to CJ Entus, ending in fourth place. Kuzan was moved up the main roster to share the starting mid position with GBM before the next season of Champions. Jin Air then attended SBENU Champions Summer 2015 but placed 6th overall, gaining 10 circuit points and qualifying for the next season of LCK but barely missing playoffs. Jin Air was seeded into the first round of the 2015 Season Korea Regional Finals and made it all the way to the finals but they lost 3–1 to KT Rolster.

=== 2016 season ===
GBM left Jin Air in November to join the new North American team NRG eSports as their mid laner. NRG started the LCS strong, tied for either first or second place through the first four weeks, but after the fifth week they fell down to fifth place and remained there for the rest of the season. They were eliminated in the first round of the playoffs.

== Coaching career ==
In December 2019, Lee announced his retirement from professional play and was signed by Griffin as a coach. In June 2020, Lee joined team Papara SuperMassive of the Turkish Championship League.

== Tournament results ==
=== Jin Air Green Wings ===
- 2nd — 2015 Season Korea Regional Finals
- 1st — Challengers Korea Summer 2015 Playoffs
- 4th — SBENU Champions Spring 2015
- 1st — The Solo King Korean 1v1 Tournament

=== NRG Esports ===
- 5th/6th — 2016 Spring NA LCS
- 9th — 2016 NA LCS Summer regular season
- Did not qualify — 2017 Spring NA LCS promotion
