= Intel Extreme Masters Season X – San Jose =

Esports event in the United States

League of Legends at the Intel Extreme Masters Season X – San Jose
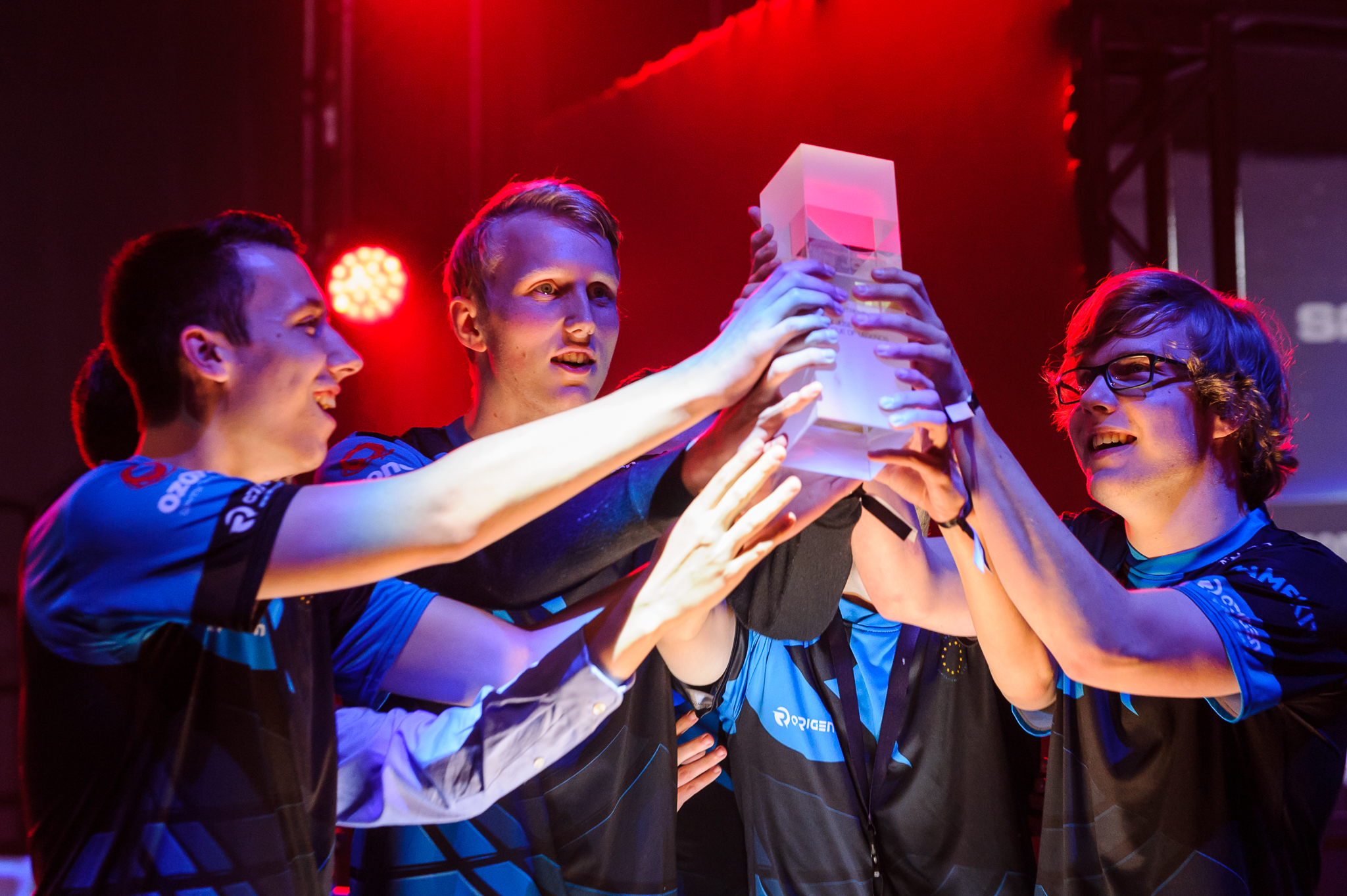
- Origen won the League of Legends event
- Venue: SAP Center
- Location: San Jose, California, US
- Dates: November 21–22, 2015
- Teams: Six

Medalists
gold medal	Origen
silver medal	Counter Logic Gaming
bronze medal	Jin Air Green Wings
bronze medal	Team SoloMid

Counter-Strike: Global Offensive at the Intel Extreme Masters Season X – San Jose
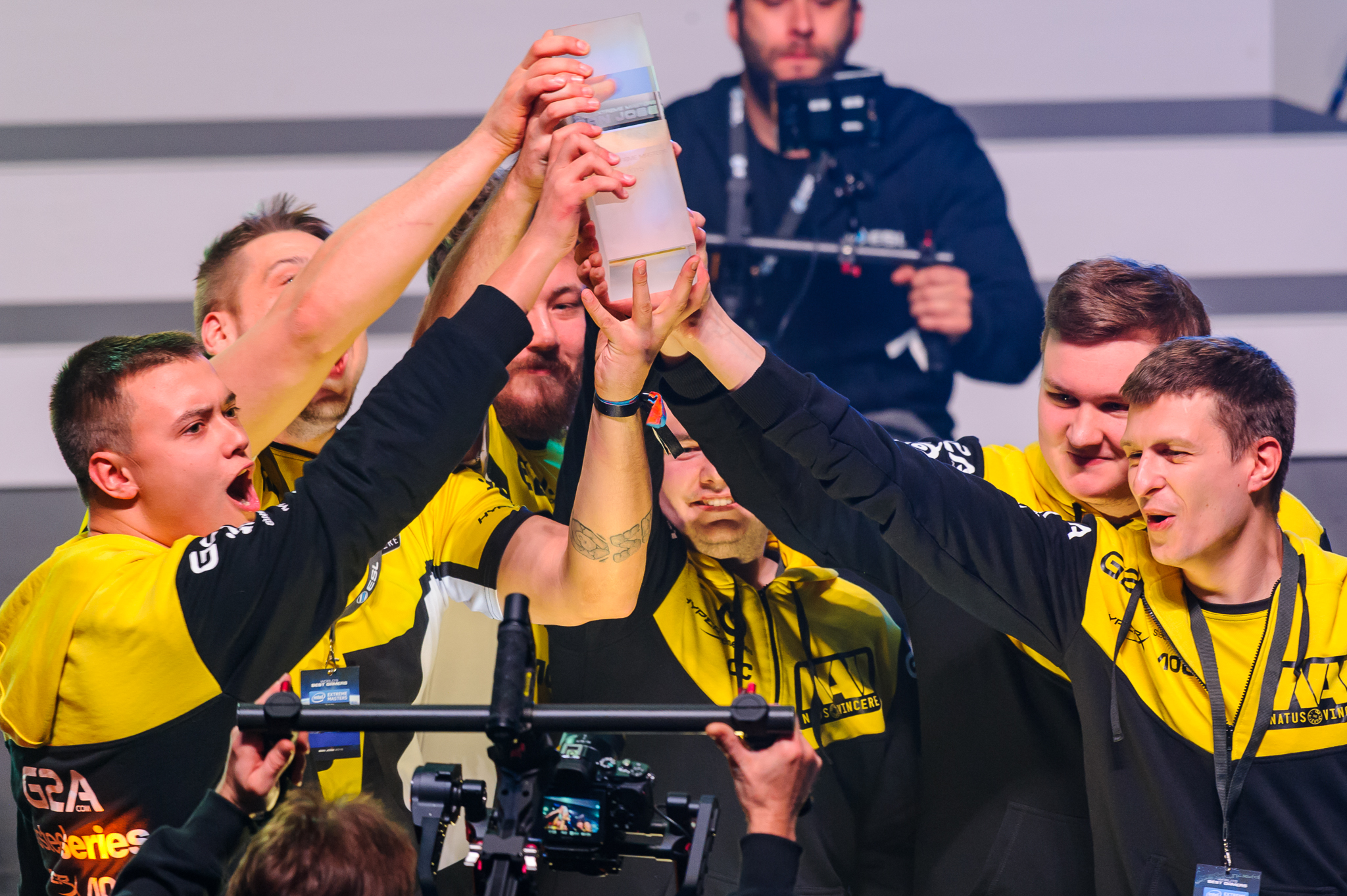
- Venue: SAP Center
- Location: San Jose, California, US
- Dates: November 21–22, 2015
- Teams: Eight
- Total prize money: $125,000 USD

Medalists
gold medal	Natus Vincere
silver medal	Team SoloMid
bronze medal	G2 Esports
bronze medal	Team Liquid

Intel Extreme Masters Season X – San Jose (IEM San Jose for short) was a video game esports tournament occurring on November 21–22, 2015 in San Jose, California, US. It was the first tournament of 10th season of the Intel Extreme Masters and featured League of Legends and Counter-Strike: Global Offensive tournaments. There was a combined US$175,000 prize pool across both games. In the case of the latter it was the first Counter-Strike event an IEM since IEM Season VI in 2012. Mark Cuban and Brian Krzanich played a charity celebrity exhibition match of League of Legends benefiting The Cybersmile Foundation.

France-based Team EnVyUs decided to withdraw from the Counter-Strike tournament because of flight delays resulting from security concerns following the November 2015 Paris attacks.

The winners of both the European and North American League of Legends Championship Series, Fnatic and Counter Logic Gaming respectively, were invited to the event. There were also a single team from the League of Legends Pro League and League of Legends Champions Korea each, LGD Gaming and Jin Air Green Wings respectively.

The event featured a unique virtual reality fan viewing experience.

== League of Legends ==
=== Teams ===
- Origen (EU LCS)
- Unicorns of Love (EU LCS)
- Counter Logic Gaming (NA LCS)
- Team SoloMid (NA LCS)
- Jin Air Green Wings (LCK)
- LGD Gaming (LPL)

=== Final standings ===
Place	Team	Prize money
1st	Origen	$25,000
2nd	Counter Logic Gaming	$11,000
3rd–4th	Team SoloMid	$5,000
3rd–4th	Jin Air Green Wings	$5,000
5th–6th	LGD Gaming	$2,000
5th–6th	Unicorns Of Love	$2,000

== Counter-Strike: Global Offensive ==
=== Teams ===
- Counter Logic Gaming
- Cloud9
- G2 Esports
- Luminosity Gaming
- Natus Vincere
- Team Liquid
- Team SoloMid
- Virtus.pro

=== Final standings ===
Place	Team	Prize money
1st	Natus Vincere	$56,250
2nd	Team SoloMid	$22,500
3rd–4th	G2 Esports	$11,250
3rd–4th	Team Liquid	$11,250
5–8th	Counter Logic Gaming	$2,812.50
5–8th	Cloud9	$2,812.50
5–8th	Luminosity Gaming	$2,812.50
5–8th	Virtus.pro	$2,812.50
