= H2k-Gaming =

UK-based esports organisation (2003–2018)

- Divisions: Call of Duty; Counter-Strike; Hearthstone; League of Legends; Overwatch; Warcraft III
- Founded: 2003
- Folded: 2018
- Based in: London, United Kingdom
- CEO: Susan Tully
- COO: Javier Zafra
- Website: www.h2k.gg

H2k-Gaming was a professional esports organization based in London, United Kingdom. It was known for its League of Legends team, which competed in Europe's top professional league, the EU LCS.

== League of Legends ==
Jungler Jean-Victor "loulex" Burgevin left the team in November 2015. They later signed former ROCCAT jungler Marcin "Jankos" Jankowski. They also signed Summer 2015 EU LCS MVP Konstantinos "FORG1VEN" Tzortziou.

=== Tournament results ===
- 3rd — 2016 League of Legends World Championship
- 3rd – 2016 EU LCS Summer Split
- 4th – 2016 EU LCS Spring Split

H2K finished with a league worst record of 2-16 during the 2018 EU LCS Summer Split. In the off season, the team decided not to apply for a spot as one of the franchised teams in the rebrand of EULCS to the LEC and subsequently disbanded, with the organization as a whole following shortly after.

== Call of Duty ==
In January 2016, H2K signed a Call of Duty team consisting of Damod "FEARS" Abney, Tyree "LegaL" Glove, Phillip "PHiZZURP" Klemenov, Andres "Lacefield" Lacefield. The team qualified for the Call of Duty World League. On 2 October 2016, Phillip "PHiZZURP" Klemenov died, following a car crash.

== Hearthstone ==
Simon "Sottle" Welch joined H2K on 22 May 2015. On 4 November 2015 he left to join complexity Gaming.
