= Skadoodle =

American esports player (born 1993)

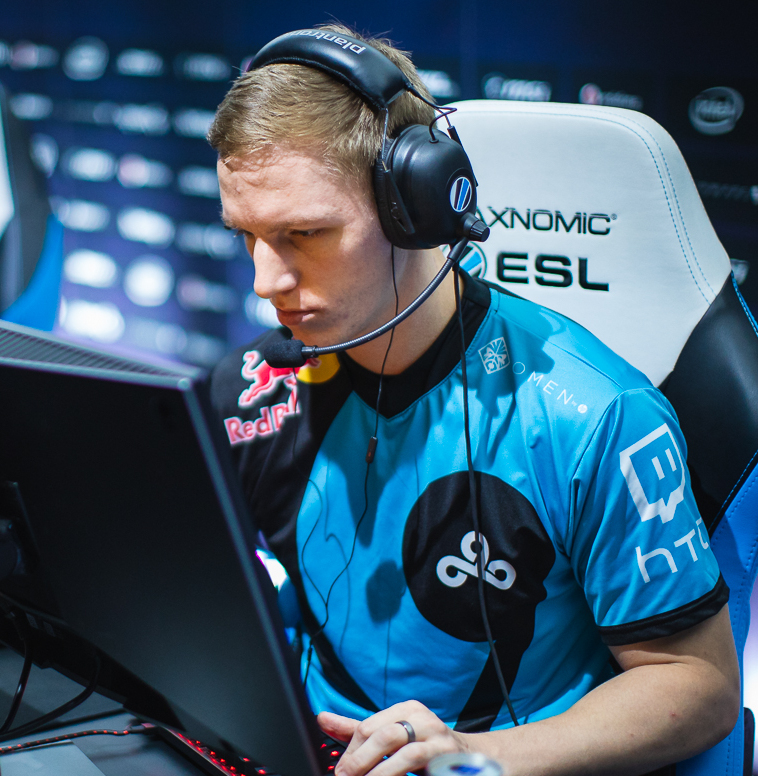
- Skadoodle in 2018

Personal information
- Name: Tyler Latham
- Born: July 31, 1993 (age 33); Quad Cities, US

Career information
- Games: Counter-Strike: Global Offensive; Valorant; Counter-Strike 2

Team history
- 2012–2013: Curse
- 2013: Denial Esports
- 2013–2015: iBUYPOWER
- 2015–2018: Cloud9
- 2020–2022: T1 (Note: In Valorant)

Career highlights and awards
- 1× Counter Strike Major champion (Boston 2018)

Tyler Latham, known professionally as Skadoodle, is an American former professional Counter-Strike: Global Offensive, Counter-Strike 2, and Valorant player. As one of North American Counter-Strike's star players, Skadoodle won a Major championship at ELEAGUE Major: Boston 2018 with Cloud9 and was named MVP of the tournament by ELEAGUE.

Skadoodle was on the iBUYPOWER roster in 2014 that was the focus of a match-fixing scandal that resulted in an indefinite ban from Major championships for Skadoodle's teammates. As Skadoodle refused to accept winnings from the match fix, he was allowed to continue to play in Majors. Skadoodle later signed with Cloud9 in 2015.

Following Cloud9's group stage exit at FACEIT Major: London 2018, Skadoodle announced his retirement from professional Counter-Strike play in October 2018. From 2020 to 2022, Skadoodle played Valorant for T1.

== Tournament record ==
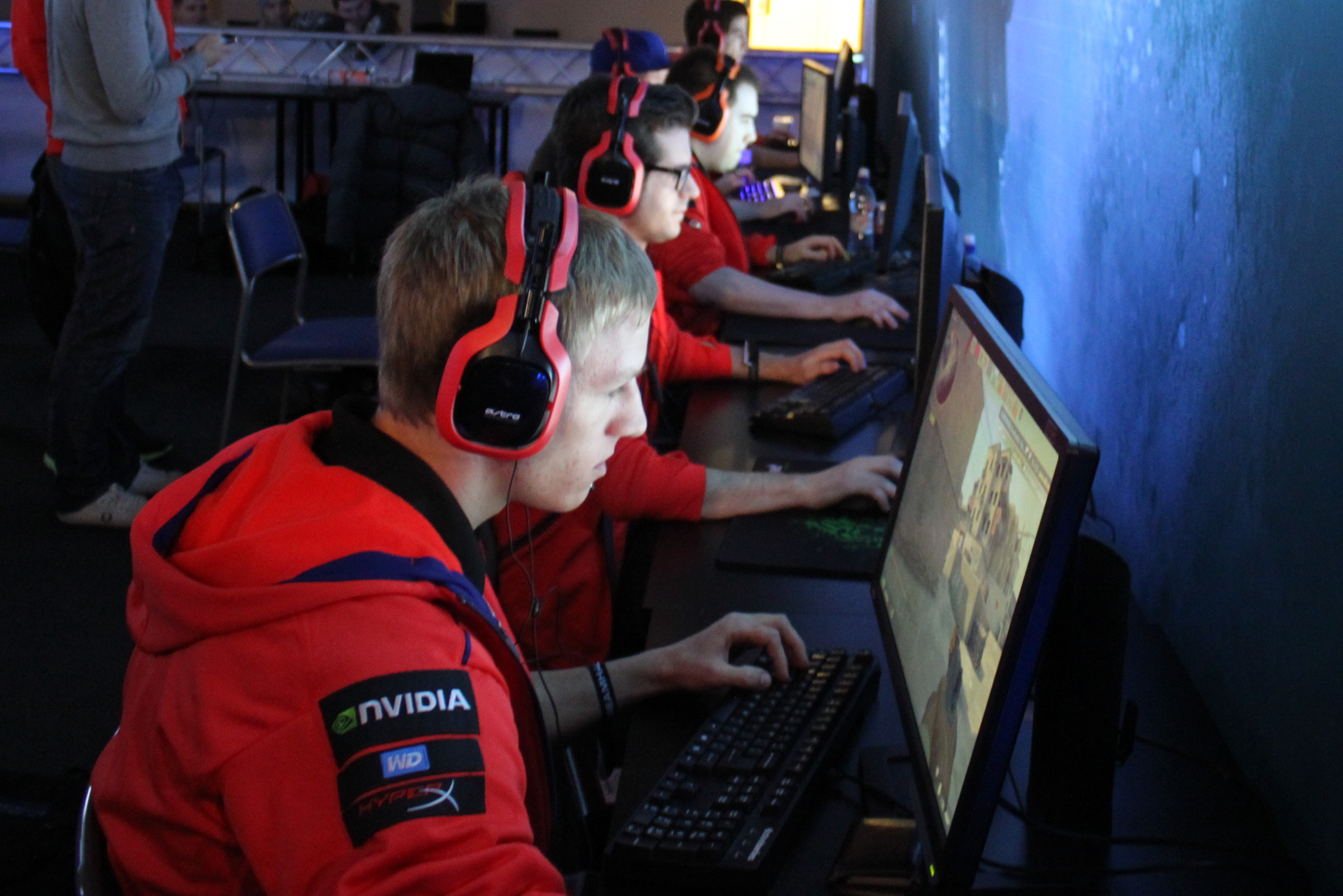
Skadoodle (front) played in Counter-Strike's first Major championship at DreamHack Winter 2013.

=== Counter-Strike Majors ===
Major	Team	Round
Counter-Strike: Global Offensive
Jönköping 2013	iBUYPOWER	Group stage
Katowice 2014	iBUYPOWER	Group stage
Cologne 2014	iBUYPOWER	Group stage
Jönköping 2014	iBUYPOWER	Group stage
Cologne 2015	Cloud9	Group stage
Cluj-Napoca 2015	Cloud9	Group stage
Columbus 2016	Cloud9	Group stage
Kraków 2017	Cloud9	Group stage
Boston 2018	Cloud9	Champion
London 2018	Cloud9	Legends stage
