= MBC Game =

- MBC Game logo
- Country: South Korea

Programming
- Language: Korean

Ownership
- Owner: MBC Plus Media

History
- Launched: September 1, 2000 (as LOOK TV); May 1, 2001 (as GEMBC); January 1, 2003 (as MBC Game)
- Closed: January 31, 2012
- Replaced by: MBC Music (now MBC M)
- Former names: LOOK TV (2000-2001); GEMBC (2001-2003)

MBC Game (Korean: MBC 게임, 엠비씨 게임) was a South Korean specialty television channel owned by MBC Plus Media. The channel primarily broadcast's programming related to video games, but it, along with its competitor Ongamenet, was well known for its extensive coverage of competitive video gaming.

== History ==
The channel was launched by CJ in September 2000 as LOOK TV, a fashion channel. On October 2, it doubled its airtime from 9 hours to 18 and increased its productions. In late March 2001, it and Dramanet were acquired by MBC. With the acquisition, the channel was reformatted as GEMBC, a game channel, before becoming MBC Game in 2003. In July 2011, its reconversion into a music channel was announced.

The channel was discontinued on January 31, 2012, and replaced by a music channel, MBC M.
