= T1 (esports) =

South Korean esports team

- Divisions: League of Legends; Overwatch; PUBG: Battlegrounds; Valorant
- Founded: 13 April 2004; 22 years ago
- Based in: Seoul, South Korea
- Colors: Red, white, and black
- CEO: Joe Marsh
- Partners: Red Sea Global, SK Telecom, ABLY, Samsung Electronics, Red Bull, Spotify, Soop, Goal Studio, Woori Bank
- Parent group: SK Telecom (54%); Comcast Spectacor (34%); Highland Capital (12%)
- Website: t1.gg

T1 (previously known as SK Telecom T1 or SKT T1) is a South Korean esports organization operated by T1 Entertainment & Sports, a joint venture between SK Telecom and Comcast Spectacor. The team that would become SKT T1 was originally founded in 2002 by StarCraft player Lim "BoxeR" Yo-hwan under the name Team Orion, which was later renamed to 4 Union in December 2003. In April 2004, South Korean wireless carrier SK Telecom began sponsoring the team, officially creating the team SK Telecom T1.

T1's League of Legends team has won a record six League of Legends World Championship titles (2013, 2015, 2016, 2023, 2024 and 2025) and ten League of Legends Champions Korea championships, also a record. In addition, they have won two Mid-Season Invitational titles (2016 and 2017), one Esports World Cup title (2024), and one KeSPA Cup (2025).

== History ==
The team that would become T1 was originally founded in 2002 by StarCraft player Lim "BoxeR" Yo-hwan under the name Team Orion, which was later renamed to 4 Union in December 2003. On 13 April 2004, South Korean wireless carrier SK Telecom sponsored the team with an investment of US$2 million, officially creating the team SK Telecom T1; by May 2005, it was estimated to have earned $15 million worth of market effects.

On 13 December 2012, SK Telecom expanded into League of Legends esports by acquiring the roster of Eat Sleep Game, and created the team SK Telecom T1 S. On 26 February 2013, they created a second League of Legends team, SK Telecom T1 K.

In 2016, SKT closed their StarCraft II division, after KeSPA announced that they would be discontinuing the Proleague.

In 2018, SK Telecom T1 expanded into two more esports, establishing a Hearthstone division on 29 July and a PlayerUnknown's Battlegrounds division on 13 August. By 2019, SKT T1 had expanded to own and operate teams in at least eight games, including the two aforementioned, League of Legends, Fortnite, Dota 2, Super Smash Bros., and Apex Legends.

In October 2019, SK Telecom T1 was rebranded to simply T1, after SK Telecom and Comcast Spectacor partnered to create T1 Entertainment & Sports, and Joe Marsh was named the CEO. League of Legends player Lee "Faker" Sang-hyeok then became a part-owner of T1 Entertainment & Sports in February 2020.

On 9 March 2020, T1 signed its first player to its newly formed Valorant team.

On 6 May 2024, the Esports World Cup Foundation, funded by the Saudi Arabia Public Investment Fund and organizers of the Esports World Cup tournament series, announced the 30 organizations that would make up the World Cup Club Support Program, with T1 being one of them. This program gives teams a one-time six-figure stipend if an organization is willing to enter new esports as well as additional funding each year if they drive viewership and fan engagement to the Esports World Cup.

== League of Legends ==
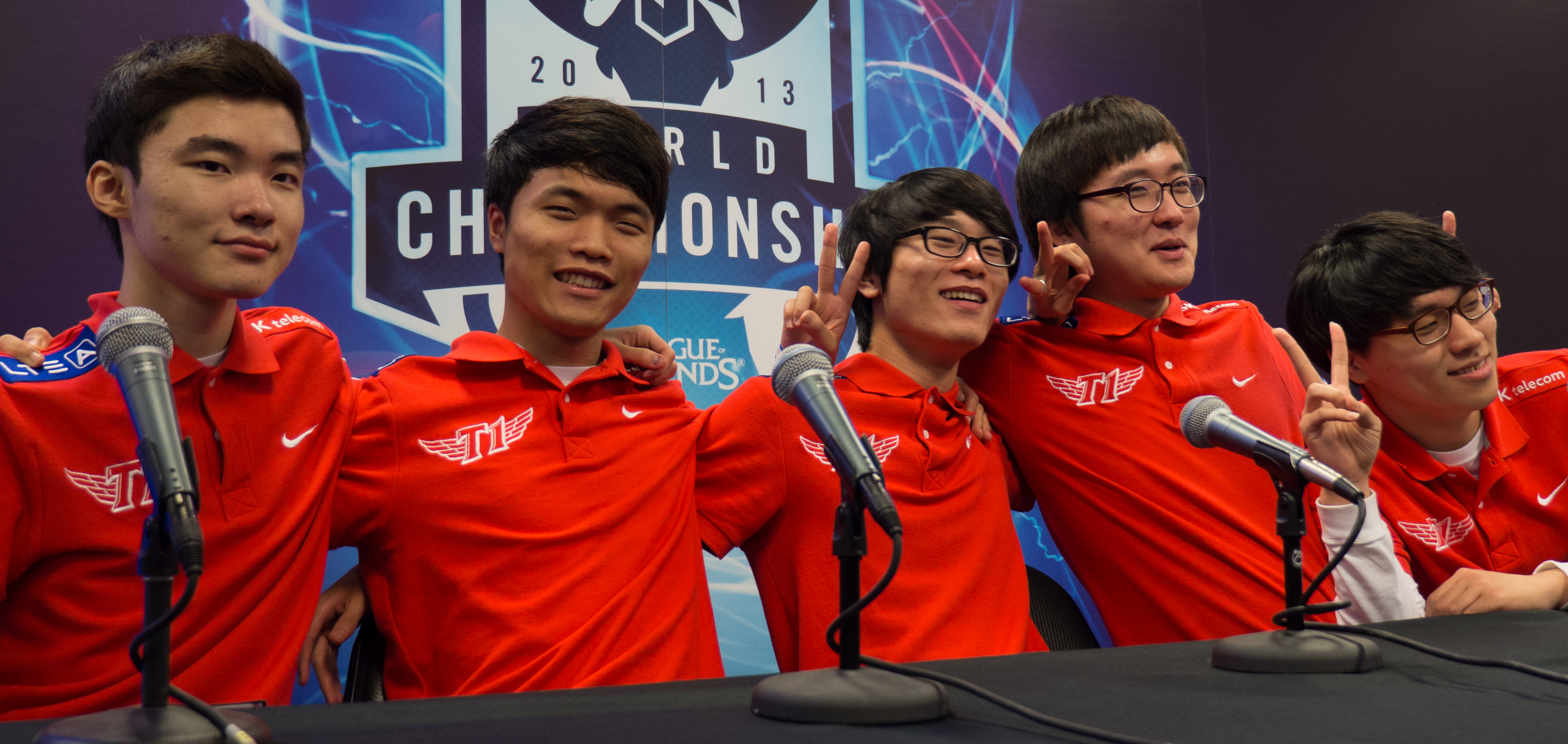
SK Telecom T1 League of Legends team at the 2013 World Championship

On 13 December 2012, SK Telecom expanded into League of Legends esports by acquiring the roster of Eat Sleep Game, and created the team SK Telecom T1 S. On 26 February 2013, they created their second League of Legends team, SK Telecom T1 K. In the same year, SKT T1 won their first League of Legends World Championship. In 2014, SK Telecom T1 K followed their success through in the OGN winter season, winning the tournament without dropping a single game. They would then go on to win All-Star Paris 2014. However, their Winter season success did not follow through and after the Spring and Summer seasons, SKT T1 K failed to qualify for the 2014 World Championship. In the following offseason, Riot Games changed the team regulations so that each organization may only have one team participating in each league. This led to the merger of SKT T1 K and SKT T1 S, and the subsequent departures of Impact and Piglet for the NA LCS. The new team would compete under the name SKT T1.

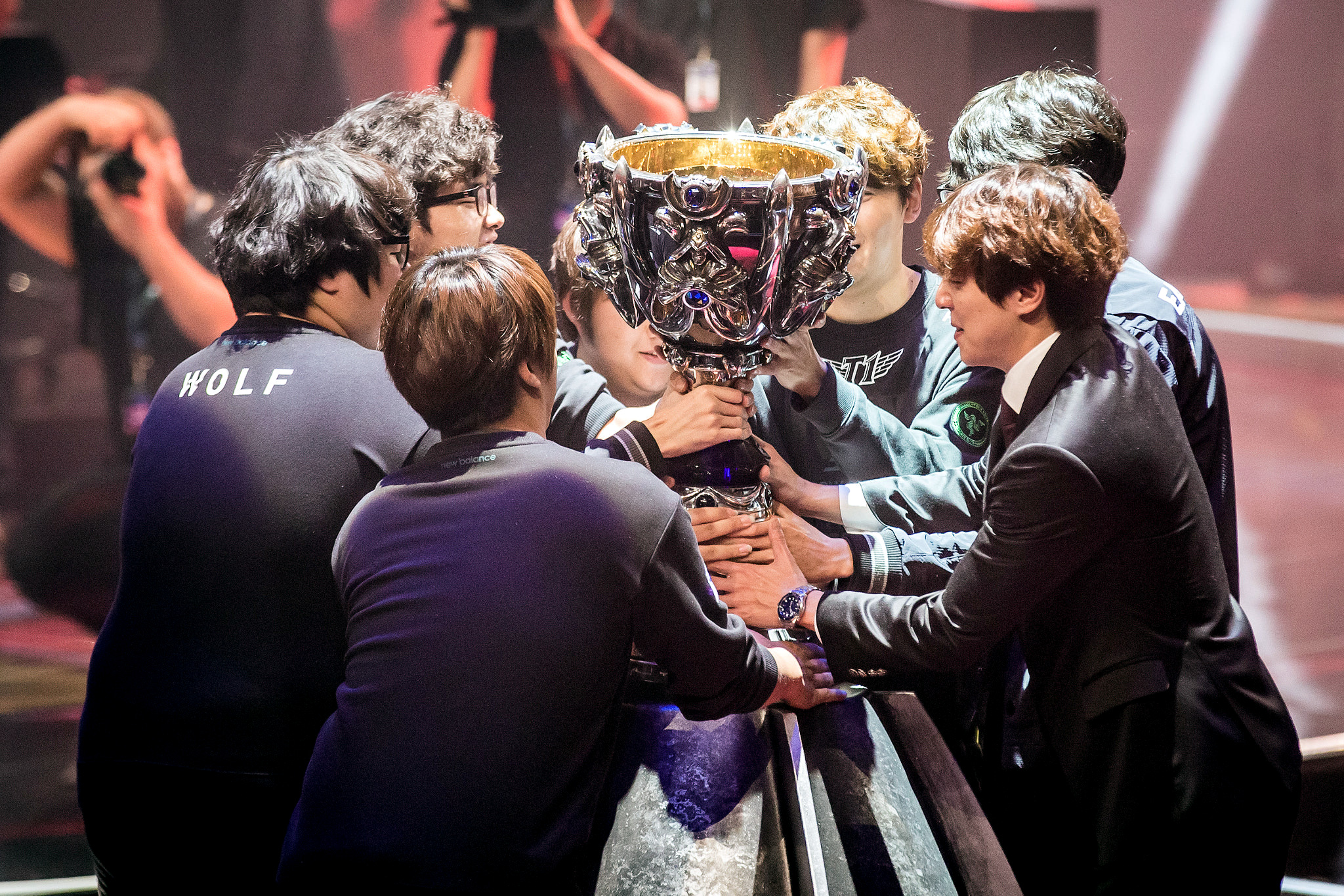
SK Telecom T1 celebrating after winning the 2015 World Championship

At the 2015 World Championship, SKT won the title while losing only one game in the finals for a record of 15–1 over the course of the tournament.

SKT team started off the 2016 Season by winning the LCK Spring Split. With this victory, SKT was guaranteed a spot in the 2016 Mid-Season Invitational. At that point in time, MSI was the only major international tournament they had yet to win. They were heavily favored coming into the tournament, but were initially unable to perform up to their usual standards, unexpectedly losing several games in the group stage. However, they managed to turn things around during the elimination round and eventually clinched the title by sweeping the North American team, Counter Logic Gaming, in the finals. SKT placed third in the 2016 LCK Summer Split, but still qualified for the 2016 World Championship through circuit points. The team swept through the group stage and advanced towards the playoff round. In the semifinals they defeated the ROX Tigers in a close 3–2 series. In the finals they defeated Samsung Galaxy in another close 3–2 series, winning their third world championship title. Faker was voted as the Most Valuable Player of the tournament.

SKT won the 2017 LCK Spring Split, cleanly sweeping KT Rolster 3–0 in the finals. This win qualified them for the 2017 Mid-Season Invitational. At the 2017 Mid-Season Invitational, SKT topped the group stage with a 8–2 record. SKT then swept Flash Wolves 3–0 in the semifinals and defeated G2 Esports 3–1 in the finals, becoming the first team to win the Mid-Season Invitational back-to-back. At the 2017 World Championship, SKT were considered to be strong favourites to lift the cup for a third consecutive time despite not winning the LCK Summer Split. After a 5–1 group stage, SKT narrowly defeated Misfits and Royal Never Give Up in the quarterfinals and semifinals, respectively, before facing Samsung Galaxy in a repeat of the previous year's final. Despite being favourites going into the game, Samsung Galaxy swept SKT 3–0, ending their domination at the World Championship.

SKT lost to Gen.G in the 2018 Korea Regional Finals, failing to qualify for the 2018 World Championship.

In April 2019, SKT won the LCK Spring Split. As champions, SKT represented the LCK at the 2019 Mid-Season Invitational. They finished the group stage in second place but lost 3–2 to G2 Esports in the semifinals. In the LCK Summer Split, SKT repeated the success and defended their title. SKT qualified as the LCK's first seed for the 2019 League of Legends World Championship, where they were once again defeated by G2 Esports in a semifinals series, losing 3–1.

In October 2019, SKT rebranded as T1 after partnering with Comcast Spectacor. In February 2020, Faker had re-signed with the team for three years, in which his contract would last until 2022. He also became a part owner of T1 Entertainment and Sports. In April of the same year, T1 defeated Gen.G and won their ninth LCK title.

At the 2021 League of Legends World Championship, T1 was eliminated in the semifinals by DWG KIA, losing 3–2 in a best-of-five series.

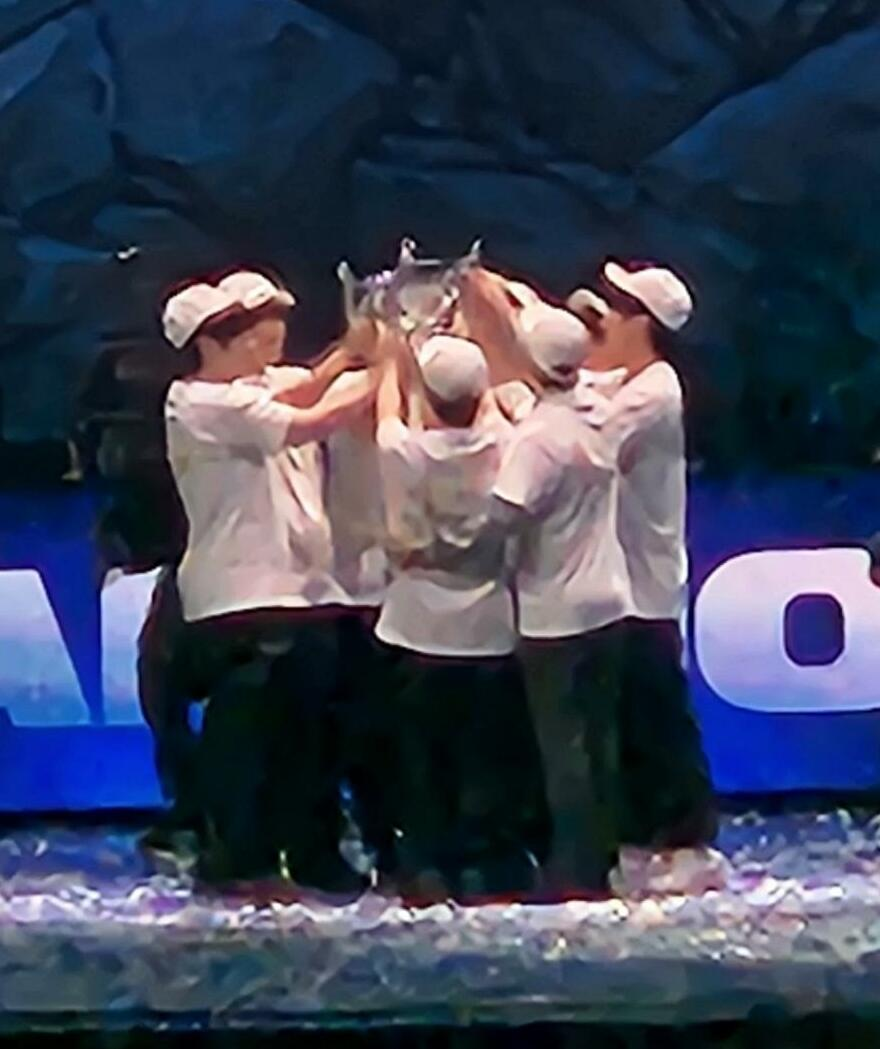
T1 players celebrating after winning the 2023 World Championship

During the 2022 LCK Spring, T1 went undefeated in the regular season with an 18–0 record, becoming the first team to achieve this record since the league's inception. In the playoffs, T1 won its tenth LCK title, defeating Gen.G 3–1 in the finals. On the international stage, T1 finished as the runners-up of the 2022 Mid-Season Invitational, losing in the final to Royal Never Give Up. The team also finished as the runners-up at the 2022 League of Legends World Championship after losing 3–2 to DRX in the final. The team had qualified for the tournament as the second seed from the LCK by the virtue of having the most Championship Points.

In the 2023 LCK Spring Split, T1 qualified for the playoffs as the first seed, posting a 17–1 record as all five members of the roster were chosen for the All-LCK First Team, a first in LCK history. The team won every series to advance to the finals, qualifying for the 2023 Mid-Season Invitational after defeating Gen.G in the upper bracket semifinals. T1 lost the Spring Split title against the same opponent in a rematch of the 2022 LCK Summer 2022 finals, as Gen.G won the match 3–1. T1 was then defeated 3–2 by JD Gaming and 3–1 by Bilibili Gaming to exit the Mid-Season Invitational at the loser-bracket final. At the 2023 League of Legends World Championship, T1 won its fourth World Championship title, the first in seven years, after defeating Weibo Gaming 3–0 in the finals held at the Gocheok Sky Dome in Seoul. T1's top laner Choi "Zeus" Woo-je was named finals MVP.

At the 2024 League of Legends World Championship, T1 won its fifth World Championship title after defeating Bilibili Gaming 3–2 in the final, held in London. Faker was named the finals MVP, marking his second time receiving the honour. T1 repeated the feat in the 2025 edition for their record-extending sixth and third consecutive title after defeating their rivals KT Rolster 3–2 in the 'Telecom Derby'.

T1 entered the 2026 LCK season with Choi "Doran" Hyeon-joon, Moon "Oner" Hyeon-jun, Lee "Faker" Sang-hyeok, Kim "Peyz" Soo-hwan, and Ryu "Keria" Min-seok. Im "Tom" Jae-hyeon served as interim head coach during the season playoffs. T1 secured qualification for the 2026 League of Legends World Championship as LCK's third seed after defeating Dplus KIA 3–1 in the lower bracket third round.

=== Seasons overview ===
As SK Telecom T1 S

Year		League of Legends Champions Korea						World Championship
Year		P	W	L	W–L%	Pos. (Note: Placements reflect standings in the team's respective group and not the entire region.)	Playoffs	World Championship
2013	Spring	10	5	5	.500	3rd	Quarterfinals	Did not qualify
2013	Summer	Did not qualify						Did not qualify
2014	Winter	6	3	3	.500	3rd	Did not qualify	Did not qualify
2014	Spring	6	3	3	.500	3rd	Did not qualify	Did not qualify
2014	Summer	6	4	2	.667	2nd	Semifinals	Did not qualify
Totals		28	15	13	.536	(2013–2014, includes only regular season)		

As SK Telecom T1 K

Year		League of Legends Champions Korea						World Championship
Year		P	W	L	W–L%	Pos.	Playoffs	World Championship
2013	Spring	10	7	3	.700	1st	Third place	Winners
2013	Summer	6	6	0	1.000	1st	Winners	Winners
2014	Winter	6	6	0	1.000	1st	Winners	Did not qualify
2014	Spring	6	3	3	.500	2nd	Quarterfinals	Did not qualify
2014	Summer	6	3	3	.500	2nd	Quarterfinals	Did not qualify
Totals		34	25	9	.735	(2013–2014, includes only regular season)		

As SK Telecom T1 / T1

Year		League of Legends Champions Korea						First Stand Tournament	Mid-Season Invitational	World Championship
Year		P	W	L	W–L%	Pos.	Playoffs	First Stand Tournament	Mid-Season Invitational	World Championship
2015	Spring	14	11	3	.786	2nd	Winners	—N/a	Runners-up	Winners
2015	Summer	18	17	1	.944	1st	Winners	—N/a	Runners-up	Winners
2016	Spring	18	12	6	.667	3rd	Winners	—N/a	Winners	Winners
2016	Summer	18	13	5	.722	2nd	Round 3	—N/a	Winners	Winners
2017	Spring	18	16	2	.889	1st	Winners	—N/a	Winners	Runners-up
2017	Summer	18	13	5	.722	4th	Runners-up	—N/a	Winners	Runners-up
2018	Spring	18	9	9	.500	4th	Round 2	—N/a	Did not qualify	Did not qualify
2018	Summer	18	8	10	.444	7th	Did not qualify	—N/a	Did not qualify	Did not qualify
2019	Spring	18	14	4	.778	2nd	Winners	—N/a	Semifinals	Semifinals
2019	Summer	18	11	7	.611	4th	Winners	—N/a	Semifinals	Semifinals
2020	Spring	18	14	4	.778	2nd	Winners	—N/a	Not held (Note: T1 qualified for the 2020 Mid-Season Invitational, but the event was cancelled due to the COVID-19 pandemic.)	Did not qualify
2020	Summer	18	13	5	.722	4th	Round 1	—N/a	Not held	Did not qualify
2021	Spring	18	11	7	.611	4th	Semifinals	—N/a	Did not qualify	Semifinals
2021	Summer	18	11	7	.611	4th	Runners-up	—N/a	Did not qualify	Semifinals
2022	Spring	18	18	0	1.000	1st	Winners	—N/a	Runners-up	Runners-up
2022	Summer	18	15	3	.833	2nd	Runners-up	—N/a	Runners-up	Runners-up
2023	Spring	18	17	1	.944	1st	Runners-up	—N/a	Lower bracket final	Winners
2023	Summer	18	9	9	.500	5th	Runners-up	—N/a	Lower bracket final	Winners
2024	Spring	18	15	3	.833	2nd	Runners-up	—N/a	Lower bracket final	Winners
2024	Summer	18	11	7	.611	4th	Lower bracket final	—N/a	Lower bracket final	Winners
In the 2025 season, the LCK Spring and Summer seasons merged into one season.
2025		30	20	10	.667	3rd	Lower bracket round 3	Did not qualify	Runners-up	Winners
2026		26	17	9	.654	3rd	Lower bracket final	Did not qualify	Lower bracket round 2	Semifinals
Totals		412	295	117	.716	(2015–2026, includes only regular season)				

=== Roster ===
T1 League of Legends roster
Players
Coaches

Role	Handle	Name	Nationality
Top	Doran	Choi Hyeon-jun	South Korea
Jungle	Oner	Moon Hyeon-jun	South Korea
Mid	Faker	Lee Sang-hyeok	South Korea
Bot	Peyz	Kim Soo-hwan	South Korea
Support	Keria	Ryu Min-seok	South Korea

Head coach

Im "Tom" Jae-hyeon
Kim "kkOma" Jeong-gyun (inactive)

Assistant coach(es)

Cho "Mata" Se-hyeong
Lee "Easyhoon" Ji-hoon

Legend:
- (I) Inactive
- (S) Suspended
- Substitute
- (injured) Injury / Illness

Roster updated June 12, 2026.

== StarCraft ==
The StarCraft division of SKT was originally founded in 2002 by player Lim "BoxeR" Yo-hwan under the name Team Orion, which was later renamed to 4 Union in December 2003. The team won the first-ever StarCraft Proleague, and by 2011, they had won the most championships of any team in Brood War history.

In 2016, SKT closed their StarCraft II division after the Proleague was discontinued.

== Valorant ==
=== 2020–2021: North American beginnings ===
T1 entered competitive Valorant in March 2020, signing former professional Counter-Strike: Global Offensive player Braxton "brax" Pierce as its first player. The organization subsequently signed Keven "AZK" Larivière in April, Austin "crashies" Roberts later that month, and Victor "food" Wong in May. Former professional Counter-Strike player Daniel "fRoD" Montaner joined as the team's head coach in May, while Tyler "Skadoodle" Latham completed the initial roster in June.

T1 won the North American competition at the Twitch Rivals: Valorant Launch Showdown and finished as runners-up at the T1 x Nerd Street Gamers Showdown. The team subsequently underwent roster changes, with crashies and food departing in September and Sam "DaZeD" Marine joining in October. Ha "Spyder" Jung-woo, formerly known as Sayaplayer, also joined the organization that month.

In 2021, T1 continued competing in the North American Valorant Champions Tour. The organization made changes to its roster, releasing brax and AZK in February and signing Timothy "autimatic" Ta and Rahul "curry" Nemani. Later that year, T1 brought back brax and added Anthony "dawn" Hagopian, while Joshua "steel" Nissan and Zander "thwifo" Kim joined the roster. Despite its roster changes, T1 did not qualify for an international VCT Masters or Champions event during the year.

=== 2022: Return to the Pacific region ===
T1 continued competing in North America during the first part of 2022 but failed to qualify for the main events of either stage of the North American VCT Challengers circuit. In May, the organization acquired Son "xeta" Seon-ho and head coach Yoon "Autumn" Eu-teum from Cloud9 in exchange for curry. T1 subsequently signed Byeon "Munchkin" Sang-beom and Joseph "ban" Seungmin Oh.

Following its selection as one of the partnered organizations for the 2023 Valorant Champions Tour Pacific league, T1 began rebuilding its roster in South Korea. In October, the organization announced the return of Sayaplayer alongside Kim "BeomJun" Beom-jun, joining xeta, Munchkin, and ban ahead of the following season.

=== 2023: Inaugural VCT Pacific season ===
T1 competed in the inaugural VCT Pacific season in 2023 as one of the league's partnered organizations. The team also participated in the 2023 VCT LOCK//IN tournament in São Paulo, Brazil, where it was eliminated in the first round by FURIA.

T1 finished third in the VCT Pacific league, qualifying for both Masters Tokyo and Valorant Champions 2023. The team finished ninth–tenth at Masters Tokyo and ninth–twelfth at Champions. Following the season, T1 made changes to its roster, with several players departing the organization.

=== 2024: Continued Pacific competition ===
Ahead of the 2024 season, T1 made several changes to its roster following the conclusion of the inaugural VCT Pacific season. The organization signed Indonesian player Kevin "xccurate" Susanto and American player Daniel "Rossy" Abedrabbo, while retaining Ha "Sayaplayer" Jung-woo, Lee "k1Ng" Seung-won, Ham "iZu" Woo-joo, and Lee "Carpe" Jae-hyeok. Yoon "Autumn" Eu-teum remained as head coach, with Lee "CheongGak" Il-ho and Dakota "Stunner" MacLeod joining the coaching staff.

T1 finished third at VCT Pacific Kickoff 2024 and third in Stage 1, qualifying for Masters Shanghai. The team was eliminated in the group stage of the tournament, finishing eleventh–twelfth. T1 subsequently finished seventh in VCT Pacific Stage 2 and did not qualify for Valorant Champions 2024.

=== 2025: Masters Bangkok championship ===
T1 finished as runners-up at VCT Pacific Kickoff 2025, qualifying for Masters Bangkok. In March 2025, the organization won its first international tournament after defeating G2 Esports 3–2 in the grand final. The victory marked T1's first international Valorant title.

Following its championship victory, T1 competed in VCT Pacific Stage 1 and Stage 2 before qualifying for Valorant Champions 2025 in Paris, France, where it finished ninth–twelfth.

=== 2026: Pacific competition ===
T1 finished as runners-up at VCT Pacific Kickoff 2026, qualifying for Masters Santiago, where it finished ninth–tenth. The team subsequently finished fourth in VCT Pacific Stage 1 and third in Stage 2, qualifying for Valorant Champions 2026 in Shanghai, China. T1 advanced to the playoffs, defeating Paper Rex in the lower bracket before being eliminated by G2 Esports, finishing fifth–sixth overall.

=== 2027: Roster changes ===
Following the conclusion of the 2026 season, T1 made several changes to its roster ahead of the 2027 VCT season. The organization parted ways with Kim "Meteor" Tae-oh, Byeon "Munchkin" Sang-beom, and substitute player Kang "DH" Dong-ho, as well as head coach Kim "KDG" Dong-gun and coach Lee "CheongGak" Il-ho.

T1 retained Kim "stax" Gu-taek, Yu "BuZz" Byung-chul, and Ham "iZu" Woo-joo, while signing Austin "crashies" Roberts and Tyson "TenZ" Ngo. Crashies returned to the organization after previously playing for T1 in 2020, while TenZ joined following his retirement from professional competition in 2024. Gustavo "Sacy" Rossi was also appointed head coach, with So "sungmin" Seong-min joining the coaching staff.

T1 Valorant roster
Players
Coaches

Handle	Name	Nationality
iZu	Ham Woo-joo	South Korea
stax	Kim Gu-taek	South Korea
BuZz	Yu Byung-chul	South Korea
crashies	Roberts, Austin	United States
TenZ	Ngo, Tyson	Canada

Head coach

Gustavo "Sacy" Rossi

Assistant coach(es)

So "sungmin" Seong-min

Legend:
- (I) Inactive
- (S) Suspended
- (C) Team captain
- Substitute
- (injured) Injury / Illness

Latest roster transaction: 12 November 2026.

== Awards and nominations ==
Year	Event	Award	Team
2013	2013 Korea e-Sports Awards	Best Esports Team; Esports grand prize of the year	SK Telecom T1 K
2015	2015 Korea e-Sports Awards	Best Esports Team	SK Telecom T1
2016	2016 Korea Esports Awards	Best Esports Team	SK Telecom T1
2019	2019 Korea Esports Hall of Fame	Best Esports Team of the Year	T1
2022	2022 Brand of the Year Award	Best Esports Team of the Year	T1
2023	2023 Esports Awards	Esports Team of the Year	T1
2024	The Game Awards 2024	Esports Team of the Year	T1
2024	2024 Esports Awards	Esports Team of the Year	T1
2024	2024 KeSPA Esports Hall of Fame	Esports Team of the Year	T1
2025	2025 Esports Awards	Esports Team of the Decade	T1

== Literature ==
- Lim Yo-hwan (21 May 2007). 나만큼 미쳐봐 [Be as crazy as me] (in Korean). Bookroad. ISBN 978-89-91239-15-9.

== Notes ==
Awards and achievements
Preceded by Taipei Assassins; Samsung Galaxy White; DRX	League of Legends World Championship winner 2013; 2015 – 2016; 2023 – 2025	Succeeded by Samsung Galaxy White; Samsung Galaxy; Bilibili Gaming
Preceded by EDward Gaming	Mid-Season Invitational winner 2016 – 2017	Succeeded by Royal Never Give Up
Preceded by MVP Ozone; KT Rolster Arrows; ROX Tigers; KT Rolster; DWG KIA	League of Legends Champions Korea winner Summer 2013 – Winter 2013–14; Spring 2015 – Spring 2016; Spring 2017; Spring 2019 – Spring 2020; Spring 2022	Succeeded by Samsung Galaxy Blue; ROX Tigers; Longzhu Gaming; Damwon Gaming; Gen.G
Preceded by Team SoloMid	Intel Extreme Masters World Championship winner Season X (2016)	Succeeded by Flash Wolves
