= 2016 League of Legends World Championship =

Video game championship

League of Legends World Championship
- 2016

Tournament information
- Location: United States
- Dates: September 29–October 29
- Administrator: Riot Games
- Tournament format(s): 16 team round-robin group stage 8 team single-elimination bracket
- Venues: 4 (in 4 host cities): San Francisco (group stage); Chicago (quarterfinals); New York (semifinals); Los Angeles (Finals)
- Teams: 16
- Purse: $5,070,000 USD

Final positions
- Champion: SK Telecom T1
- Runner-up: Samsung Galaxy

Tournament statistics
- Matches played: 75
- MVP: Lee "Faker" Sang-hyeok (SK Telecom T1)

The 2016 League of Legends World Championship was an esports tournament for the multiplayer online battle arena video game League of Legends. It was the sixth iteration of the League of Legends World Championship, an annual international tournament organized by the game's developer, Riot Games. It was held from September 29 to October 29, 2016, in cities across the United States. Sixteen teams qualified for the tournament based on their placement in regional circuits such as those in North America, Europe, South Korea, and China. The tournament's group stage was held at the Bill Graham Civic Auditorium in San Francisco, the quarterfinals at The Chicago Theater in Chicago, and the semifinals at Madison Square Garden in New York City. The final was held in front of a crowd of nearly 20,000 fans at the Staples Center in Los Angeles. Russian-German DJ Zedd made an exclusive song for the tournament titled "Ignite" which became available for streaming viewing on the game's official YouTube channel.

SK Telecom T1 defended their title from the 2015 League of Legends World Championship by defeating runner-up Samsung Galaxy 3–2 in a best of five final series. With their win, SKT became the first three-time League of Legends world champion. SKT's Lee "Faker" Sang-hyeok was named MVP of the tournament. The final prize pool reached $6.7 million, the largest single prize pool in League of Legends history. The final was followed by 43 million unique viewers, with a peak concurrent viewership of 14.7 million. Its success prompted the team in charge of the Los Angeles bid for the 2024 Summer Olympics (which ultimately led to LA hosting the 2028 Games) to look into including esports presentation technologies used by Riot Games if the bid is successful.

== Background ==
After the 2015 League of Legends World Championship was held across Europe, the 2016 edition was held in North America.

The original prize pool was $2.13 million contributed by Riot Games, with the final amount being calculated after fan contributions stopped on November 6. Riot pledged to add 25% of all revenue generated from selling Championship wards and skins – customizations for the player controlled hero character – to the prize pool. On October 28, the sale of these unique Championship skins had grown the prize pool to $5.07 million, making it the largest single prize pool in League of Legends history. The final prize pool reached $6.7 million. Riot announced that 40% of the prize pool will be awarded to the winning team and 15% to the runner up. The winning team would also receive 25% of revenue from skins created to commemorate the championship victory.

To encourage new viewers to watch, Riot Games set up a second stream specifically for new viewers, which would help explain basic game concepts that more experienced viewers on the regular stream would be familiar with.

Riot Games collaborated with Zedd, an electronic dance music disc jockey to create "Ignite", a dance music anthem for the tournament. The video referenced multiple highlights from previous League of Legends world championships. As of July 2022, it has almost 90 million views on YouTube.

== Teams and qualifications ==
Based on the results of the 2016 MSI, the European (EU LCS) summer split champion team was seeded to Pool 2, since the European team that participated in the 2016 MSI, G2 Esports, did not qualify for top 4.

Region		League		Path	Team	ID	Pool
North America		NA LCS		Summer Champion	Team SoloMid	TSM	1
North America		NA LCS		Most Championship Points	Counter Logic Gaming	CLG	2
North America		NA LCS		Regional Finals Winner	Cloud9	C9	3
Europe		EU LCS		Summer Champion	G2 Esports	G2	2
Europe		EU LCS		Most Championship Points	H2k-Gaming	H2K	2
Europe		EU LCS		Regional Finals Winner	Splyce	SPY	3
China		LPL		Summer Champion	EDward Gaming	EDG	1
China		LPL		Most Championship Points	Royal Never Give Up	RNG	2
China		LPL		Regional Finals Winner	I May	IM	2
South Korea		LCK		Summer Champion	ROX Tigers	ROX	1
South Korea		LCK		Most Championship Points	SK Telecom T1	SKT	2
South Korea		LCK		Regional Finals Winner	Samsung Galaxy	SSG	2
TW/HK/MO		LMS		Summer Champion	Flash Wolves	FW	1
TW/HK/MO		LMS		Regional Finals Winner	ahq e-Sports Club	AHQ	2
Wildcard	Brazil	CBLOL	IWCQ	CBLol Winter Champion ►IWCQ Brazil Winner #1	INTZ e-Sports	ITZ	3
Wildcard	CIS	LCL	IWCQ	LCL Summer Champion ►IWCQ Brazil Winner #2	Albus NoX Luna	ANX	3

== Venues ==
San Francisco, Chicago, New York City, Los Angeles were four cities chosen to host the tournament.

United States
San Francisco	Chicago	New York City	Los Angeles
Group Stage	Quarterfinals	Semifinals	Finals
Bill Graham Civic Auditorium	Chicago Theatre	Madison Square Garden	Staples Center
Capacity: 7,000	Capacity: 3,800	Capacity: 18,200	Capacity: 18,188
Sep 29 – Oct 9	Oct 13 – Oct 16	Oct 21 – Oct 22	Oct 29
2016 League of Legends World Championship is located in the United States

== Group stage ==
The group stage was held at the Bill Graham Civic Auditorium in San Francisco, California. The group stage was played in a best of one double round-robin format, where each team played every other team in their group twice, with the top two teams from each of the four groups advancing to the knockout stage.

Tiebreaking matches were played in groups A and C.

=== Group A ===
The Cinderella story of the tournament was the run of Albus NoX Luna, the CIS champions who became the first wildcard team to make it to the quarterfinals in the history of the League of Legends World Championship. European first seed G2 Esports underperformed in this group, while ROX Tigers, the second seed from Korea, won the group as expected, but had to do so by defeating Albus NoX Luna in a tiebreaker game.

Pos	Team	Pld	W	L	PCT	Qualification
1	ROX Tigers	7	5	2	.714	Advance to knockouts
2	Albus NoX Luna	7	4	3	.571	Advance to knockouts
3	Counter Logic Gaming	6	3	3	.500	
4	G2 Esports	6	1	5	.167	

Source: LoL Esports (Archived 2018-12-18 at the Wayback Machine)

=== Group B ===
Group B's deciding matches all occurred on the last day, when all teams except for the Korean first seed SK Telecom T1 had 2–3 records. In the end, it was Cloud9, the sole North American team to move on, to advance after exploiting the inconsistent play of the Chinese and Taiwanese teams. I May was also hurt when one of its players was suspended for one match on the last day and fined $2000 for abusive behavior in online games. During Cloud 9's match against Flash Wolves, Zachary "Sneaky" Scuderi killed 690 minions, which set a new record for this statistic at worlds.

Pos	Team	Pld	W	L	PCT	Qualification
1	SK Telecom T1	6	5	1	.833	Advance to knockouts
2	Cloud9	6	3	3	.500	Advance to knockouts
3	I May	6	2	4	.333	
4	Flash Wolves	6	2	4	.333	

Source: LoL Esports (Archived 2018-12-18 at the Wayback Machine)

=== Group C ===
Group C was the only group without a Korean team seeded first. Its two qualifiers were both considered championship favorites, since H2K-Gaming was a strong European team and EDward Gaming was a strong Chinese team. Despite a 1–2 showing in the first week, H2K managed to make the quarterfinals at the top of its group by winning four straight matches, including a tiebreaker against EDward Gaming, to become the only European team to move on.

Pos	Team	Pld	W	L	PCT	Qualification
1	H2k-Gaming	7	5	2	.714	Advance to knockouts
2	Edward Gaming	7	4	3	.571	Advance to knockouts
3	ahq e-Sports Club	6	3	3	.500	
4	INTZ e-Sports Club	6	1	5	.167	

Source: LoL Esports (Archived 2018-12-18 at the Wayback Machine)

=== Group D ===
Group D was considered to be the group of death because it had three top Korean, Chinese, and North American teams, and a strong European team. Samsung Galaxy, would convincingly win the group with help from the strong play of Kang "Ambition" Chang-yong. Royal Never Give Up defeated the North American champions TSM to even their records at 3–3 and win the head-to-head tiebreaker to move on to the quarterfinals.

Pos	Team	Pld	W	L	PCT	Qualification
1	Samsung Galaxy	6	5	1	.833	Advance to knockouts
2	Royal Never Give Up	6	3	3	.500	Advance to knockouts
3	Team SoloMid	6	3	3	.500	
4	Splyce	6	1	5	.167	

Source: LoL Esports (Archived 2018-12-18 at the Wayback Machine)

== Knockout stage ==
=== Quarterfinals and semi-finals ===
The quarterfinals were held at the Chicago Theatre, starting on October 13. Teams were seeded against each other based on their performance in the group stage, and played a best-of-five, single-elimination bracket.

All three of the Korean teams, SK Telecom T1, ROX Tigers, and Samsung Galaxy, advanced to the quarterfinals from the group stage. Two Chinese teams, EDward Gaming and Royal Never Give Up, advanced by finishing second in their groups. Cloud9 and H2k-Gaming were respectively the only North American and European teams to advance out of groups. The last team to make it to the quarterfinals was Albus NoX Luna, a Russian wildcard team that finished second in its group.

Three teams from the League of Legends Champions Korea (LCK) circuit and one from the European League of Legends Championship Series (EULCS) made it to the semi-finals. H2K-Gaming ended the wildcard run of Albus NoX by sweeping them 3–0 in the quarterfinals. Meanwhile, the three Korean teams ended the runs of EDward Gaming and Royal Never Give Up, the last two Chinese teams, and the run of Cloud 9, the last North American team.

The semi-finals were held at Madison Square Garden in New York over two days. SK Telecom T1 won a five-game series against the ROX Tigers, who had won the 2015 Summer League of Legends Championship Korea season and were favorites to win this event. Many commentators called this matchup the true World Finals and many still call it the greatest best of 5 series in League of Legends esports history. In the other semi-finals, Samsung Galaxy swept H2k-Gaming, the last European team in the tournament, 3–0 to advance to the finals.

=== Finals ===
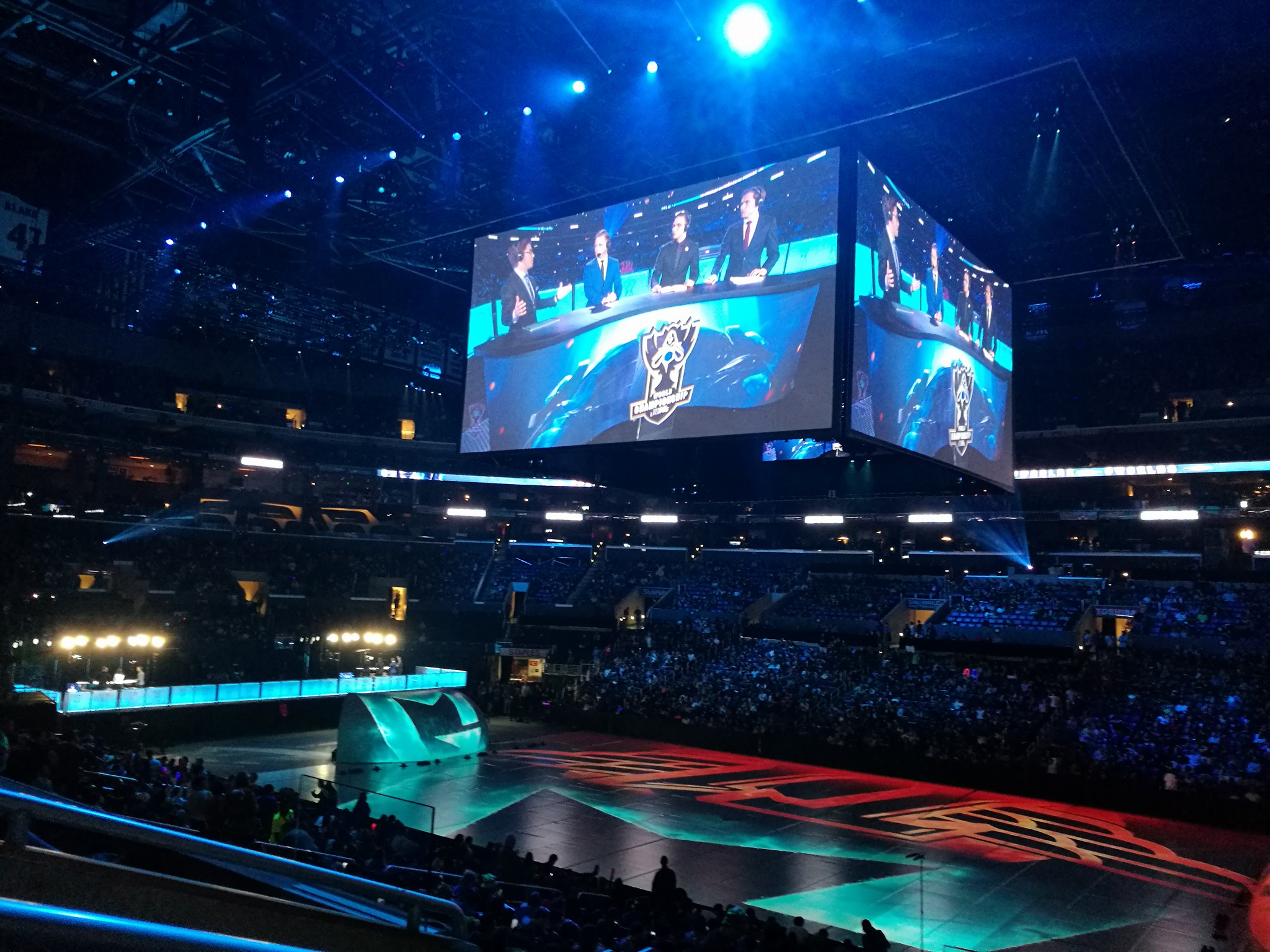
The Staples Center as used for the 2016 League of Legends World Championship finals.

The final lasted six hours and was played in front of a crowd of nearly 20,000 fans at the Staples Center in Los Angeles. A projection of the minimap which showed each team's map control was shown on the floor of the arena between the two teams. Most of the players for Samsung Galaxy (SSG) had never played in the finals before, while most members of SK Telecom (SKT) were returning members of the 2015 championship team. It was the first finals series in a League of Legends world championship to go the full five games.

The first match of the best of five series lasted 40 minutes and was won by SK Telecom, who were able to attack Samsung Galaxy's undefended base after winning a big "all-in" battle between the two teams. The second match was also won by SKT, who were able to continuously build up an insurmountable advantage after winning a battle in the mid-game, ending the game after 31 minutes.

After losing the first two games, Samsung Galaxy won a long third game against SK Telecom. SKT dominated the early stages of the game and built up a lead in both kills and gold. The turning point in this game was a fight over Baron, an important in-game objective, where Samsung Galaxy was able to kill half of SK Telecom's team and destroy two of their turrets afterwards. After winning a similar engagement over Baron later in the game, Samsung Galaxy was then able to quickly destroy five of SKT's defensive towers and win the game. This third game was the second-longest in competitive League of Legends history, at 71 minutes and 20 seconds.

Samsung Galaxy then won the fourth game, also after winning a key fight over Baron. Despite losing two inhibitor buildings in their base, SKT was able to stall SSG with defensive play until the 42-minute mark, after which SSG took three Dragons – another in game objective – uncontested and gained buffs that allowed them to win the game. In the final game, SK Telecom played a more cautious gameplay style, which was effective against Samsung Galaxy's riskier play. SKT was able to grab two Baron kills and two Elder Dragon kills en route to winning the final game.

SK Telecom's team shared a $2 million prize purse between its members. The championship victory was SKT's third in four years, and a successful defense of their 2015 title. SKT also became the first team to win three world championships. ESPN's Timothy Lee called the finals "an instant classic". SKT's Lee Sang-hyeok, who uses the handle "Faker", was named as the tournament MVP. It was Faker's first Worlds MVP. Faker's performance on the map's middle lane broke the previous 208 kills record at Worlds by the third map of the finals, and he ended up with 217 kills.

=== Bracket ===
Competition table

Quarterfinals
SK Telecom T1	3
Royal Never Give Up	1
ROX Tigers	3
EDward Gaming	1
H2K-Gaming	3
Albus NoX Luna	0
Samsung Galaxy	3
Cloud9	0

Semifinals
SK Telecom T1	3
ROX Tigers	2
H2K-Gaming	0
Samsung Galaxy	3

Final
SK Telecom T1	3
Samsung Galaxy	2

== Final standings ==
- Initial prize pool US$2,130,000
- 25% of sales from Championship Zed skins & Championship ward skins increase the prize pool.
- On October 28, the prize pool reached US$5,070,000

Final standings, 2016
Places	Team	Prize (USD)	Prize (%)
1st	SK Telecom T1	$2,028,000	40%
2nd	Samsung Galaxy	$760,500	15%
3rd–4th	ROX Tigers	$380,250	7.5%
3rd–4th	H2K-Gaming	$380,250	7.5%
5th–8th	Cloud9	$202,800	4%
5th–8th	EDward Gaming	$202,800	4%
5th–8th	Royal Never Give Up	$202,800	4%
5th–8th	Albus NoX Luna	$202,800	4%
9th–12th	Counter Logic Gaming	$114,075	2.25%
9th–12th	ahq e-Sports Club	$114,075	2.25%
9th–12th	Team SoloMid	$114,075	2.25%
9th–12th	I May	$114,075	2.25%
13th–16th	Flash Wolves	$63,375	1.25%
13th–16th	INTZ e-Sports	$63,375	1.25%
13th–16th	G2 Esports	$63,375	1.25%
13th–16th	Splyce	$63,375	1.25%

== Legacy ==
Viewership numbers were higher than those for the 2015 League of Legends World Championship. 43 million unique viewers saw the finals and peak concurrent viewership for the finals was 14.7 million; 370 million hours of esports were streamed over the course of the entire world championship. The final prize pool, which included fan contributions via purchase of in-game items, was worth $6.7 million. The total cumulative daily unique impressions (the amount of unique viewers that tuned in every day via online and television channels) reached 396 million.

LA 2024, who oversaw the Los Angeles bid for the 2024 Summer Olympics, was inspired by the success of this edition of the League of Legends World Championship to plan and include esports in the Olympic Games if they win the bid. Casey Wasserman, the chairman of LA 2024, suggested using technology used in certain segments of the League of Legends World Championship such as augmented reality and virtual reality to make the Olympics more accessible to a younger demographic. In September 2017, the International Olympic Committee (IOC) awarded the 2024 Summer Olympics to Paris, France, whilst Los Angeles would host the 2028 edition. The IOC would itself invest in esports by launching the Olympic Esports Week in 2022, which expanded to the Olympic Esports Series in 2023. In July 2024, the Olympic Esports Games were launched, with the first edition planned for 2025 in Saudi Arabia.
