= Copenhagen Wolves =

Defunct Danish esports organization

- Short name: CPHW, CW
- Divisions: Counter-Strike 2 PUBG
- Founded: 2009
- Based in: Copenhagen, Denmark
- Colours: Orange, Dark Orange, Black, Grey, White
- Owner: Jared Habib
- Partners: Skinrave
- Website: www.copenhagenwolves.gg

Copenhagen Wolves is an American-owned esports organization based in Copenhagen, Denmark.

== History ==
Copenhagen Wolves was founded in 2009 and quickly became one of the most recognized Danish esports organizations, competing at the highest levels in Counter-Strike: Global Offensive, Hearthstone, and League of Legends. The organization ceased all operations on June 6, 2016, citing the owners’ increasing responsibilities in other organizations, namely Astralis and Ninjas in Pyjamas.

After a seven-year hiatus, the brand was revived in December 2023 by American entrepreneur Jared Habib. Initially returning with a Counter-Strike 2 roster, the organization later expanded into PUBG in November 2025.

== Counter-Strike 2 ==
=== Current roster ===
Nat.	Name	ID	Role
(Bulgaria)	Georgi Mitev	Jorko	AWP
(Poland)	Maciej Biliński	b1elany	Support
(Denmark)	Mikkel Borlund	n1Xen	Rifler
(Norway)	Sindre Ellefsen	Tapewaare	In-Game Leader
(Croatia)	Mateo Prišlin	Matheos	Rifler
(Denmark)	Martin Rian Christensen	Sinzey	Team coach

== PlayerUnknown's Battlegrounds ==
On November 5, 2025, Copenhagen Wolves signed the former MRIA (Mission Ready International Alliance) roster. The team will compete in the PUBG Global Championship 2025, the final event and World Championship of the 2025 competitive season organized by PUBG Corporation, featuring the best teams from around the world who qualified throughout the year.

=== Current roster ===
Nat.	Name	ID
(United States)	Asher Tankel	gats
(United Kingdom)	Michael Wake	mykLe
(United States)	Richard Battaglia	RichyB
(United States)	Jake Winant	Snakers
(United States)	Jace Patras	Vox
(United States)	Lawrence Meredith	Trevor
