= SPOTV =

South Korean pay television network for sports

- Broadcast area: South Korea; Southeast Asia; Hong Kong; Macau; Taiwan
- Headquarters: Seoul, South Korea

Programming
- Languages: Korean (South Korea); English; Chinese (Mandarin/Cantonese; Hong Kong, Macau, Taiwan, Singapore, Malaysia only); Malay(sian) (Malaysia and Singapore only); Indonesian (Indonesia only); Filipino (Philippines only); Thai (Thailand only); Vietnamese (Vietnam only)
- Picture format: 720p/1080i HDTV

Ownership
- Owner: Eclat Media Group

History
- Launched: October 1, 2021 (Malaysia, Astro feed; Thailand, TrueVisions feed); October 4, 2021 (Philippines, Sky Cable feed); October 11, 2021 (Singapore, Singtel TV feed); October 14, 2021 (Malaysia, Unifi TV feed); October 22, 2021 (Singapore, StarHub TV feed); December 1, 2021 (Brunei, Kristal Astro feed); January 11, 2022 (Indonesia, MNC Vision Networks (MVN) and IndiHome feed); March 1, 2022 (Hong Kong); March 3, 2022 (Indonesia, First Media feed); June 16, 2022 (Philippines, Cignal feed); December 24, 2023 (Vietnam, MyTV feed); March 9, 2024 (Indonesia, Vidio feed)
- Closed: February 1, 2025 (Hong Kong); November 4, 2025 (Philippines, Sky Cable feed); January 1, 2026 (Malaysia, Astro feed)

Links
- Website: spotv.net (South Korea) spotvasia.com (Southeast Asia)

SPOTV is a South Korean pay television network, which features sports programming and some sports-related talk shows. Founded in 2010, the network is the fourth premium sports network in South Korea following by KBS N Sports, MBC Sports+ and SBS Sports (the latter two of which were previously founded under a joint venture with ESPN International in the early 2000s and 2010s respectively).

On December 1, 2015, The Daily Dot reported that SPOTV may be acquiring the rights to broadcast League of Legends Champions Korea from OnGameNet (now called OGN) for its sister channel SPOTV Games, which mostly aired eSports tournaments, before it was rebranded as STATV in March 2020, which focus on athletes and celebrities. They also got SPOTV ON, which aired sports that didn't usually air on SPOTV & SPOTV2, along with SPOTV Golf & Health for golf and wellness. SPOTV Now, a sports-dedicated streaming service similar to DAZN and ESPN+, has also launched, not just in South Korea, but also recently in Southeast Asia.

In May 2020, the U.S. television network ESPN began showing Korea Baseball Organization games with video feed from SPOTV following the lack of live sports programming in the United States due to the pandemic.

On September 14, 2021, Eclat Entertainment announced that they will bring SPOTV to 13 Southeast Asian countries. SPOTV will take over the role of recently closed Fox Sports Asia in those countries, awhile to promoting other sporting events which has been aired in the respective Asian countries. SPOTV were also responsible to covering the remaining 2021 MotoGP World Championship where Fox Sports abruptly concluding the coverage following the shutdown announcement.

== Broadcasting rights ==
=== South Korea ===
==== Football ====
- Italy: Serie A
- Australia: A-League Men
- England: EFL Cup
- UEFA: UEFA Champions League, UEFA Europa League, UEFA Conference League (from 2021–22), UEFA Nations League, UEFA Super Cup, UEFA European Qualifiers, UEFA Women's Championship
- Scotland: SPFL
- Other:
  - Finalissima 2022
  - ASEAN Championship (2024–present)
  - ASEAN U-23 Championship (2025–present)
  - ASEAN Women's Championship (2025–present)
  - ASEAN Club Championship (2024–present)
  - Major League Soccer (2025–present) (Note: All Los Angeles FC matches)

==== Baseball ====
- KBO League (shared with KBS, MBC, SBS)
- Major League Baseball

==== Basketball ====
- NCAA Division I men's basketball tournament

==== Tennis ====
- ATP
- WTA
- Wimbledon (2022–2024)
- U.S. Open (2022–2024)

==== Badminton ====
- BWF
- BDMNTN-XL

==== Motorsports ====
- MotoGP
  - Moto2
  - Moto3
  - MotoE
  - Red Bull MotoGP Rookies Cup
  - Asia Talent Cup
- Superbike World Championship
- Supersport World Championship
- Supersport 300 World Championship
- FIM Women's Circuit Racing World Championship
- World Rally Championship
- IndyCar Series
- Indy NXT
- Formula E
- IMSA
  - IMSA SportsCar Championship
  - IMSA VP Racing SportsCar Challenge
  - Michelin Pilot Challenge
- Asia Road Racing Championship
- FIA World Endurance Championship

==== Volleyball ====
- CVL (Note: Women's Super League, from 2021–22 season, all Shanghai Bright Ubest matches)

==== Golf ====
- PGA Tour
- PGA European Tour
- Ladies European Tour
- Ryder Cup
- Asian Tour
- PGA Champions Tour
- LIV Golf (Note: Shared with SBS Sports and MBC Sports+)
- Icon Series (Note: Shared with DAZN)
- Presidents Cup

==== Multisport Events ====
- Asian Games (2026)

=== Southeast Asia, Hong Kong, Macau ando Taiwan ===
==== Football ====
- Football Australia
  - A-League Men
  - Australia Cup (final only)
  - Australia women's national soccer team matches (excluding Malaysia)
- Saudi Arabia: Saudi Pro League, Saudi King's Cup, Saudi Super Cup
- SPFL (only for Indonesia, Philippines, Singapore and Macau)
- Globe Soccer Awards
- Thai League 1 (2024–25 season only, excluding Thailand)
- UEFA European Championship (2024, Malaysia and Singapore only)

==== Badminton ====
- BDMNTN-XL

==== Baseball ====
- Caribbean Series (2027–upcoming)
- LVBP (2027–upcoming)
- Major League Baseball (2024–present; From 2025 onwards, TV coverage is not available in Indonesia but still available on SPOTV Now)
- Serie de las Americas (2027–upcoming)
- 2026 World Baseball Classic

==== Billiards (excluding Philippines) ====
- Derby City Classic Billiards Tournament
- World 10-ball Championship
- Women's World 10-ball Championship

==== Cycling ====
- Giro d'Italia

==== Golf ====
- The Masters
- PGA Championship
- Senior PGA Championship
- U.S. Open
- U.S. Senior Open
- The Open Championship
- Senior Open Championship
- Women's British Open
- Ryder Cup
- Asian Tour

==== Horse racing ====
- Kentucky Derby
- Preakness Stakes
- Belmont Stakes
- Saudi Cup
- Dubai World Cup
- Royal Ascot
- Breeders' Cup

==== Motorsports ====
- MotoGP
  - Moto2
  - Moto3
  - MotoE
  - Red Bull MotoGP Rookies Cup
  - Asia Talent Cup
- Superbike World Championship
- Supersport World Championship
- Supersport 300 World Championship
- Women's Circuit Racing World Championship
- Formula E
- Supercars Championship (Note: Races only)
- Extreme E (Note: Shared with Eleven Sports/DAZN and W-Sport (Non-Exclusive Rights))
- European Le Mans Series
- GT World Challenge Asia
- Asia Road Racing Championship
- NASCAR Cup Series

==== Squash ====
- PSA World Tour

==== Table Tennis ====
- World Table Tennis

==== Tennis ====
- Wimbledon (2021–2026)
- U.S. Open (2021–2026)
- Mubadala World Tennis Championship

==== Triathlon ====
- PTO Tour (Note: Shared with DAZN, Eurosport and beIN Sports (Non-Exclusive Rights))

==== Volleyball ====
- Australian Volleyball Super League

==== Figure Skating ====
- ISU Grand Prix of Figure Skating (Note: Shared with TAP Sports/Premier Sports (Philippines))
- World Figure Skating Championships

== See also ==
- KBS N Sports
- MBC Sports+
- SBS Sports
- JTBC Sports
