= Samsung Galaxy (esports) =

Former professional esports organization

- Short name: SSG; SSW (Samsung White); SSB (Samsung Blue)
- Founded: 2000 (as Samsung KHAN)
- Folded: 2017
- Location: South Korea
- Partners: Samsung Electronics
- Website: www.samsungkhan.co.kr

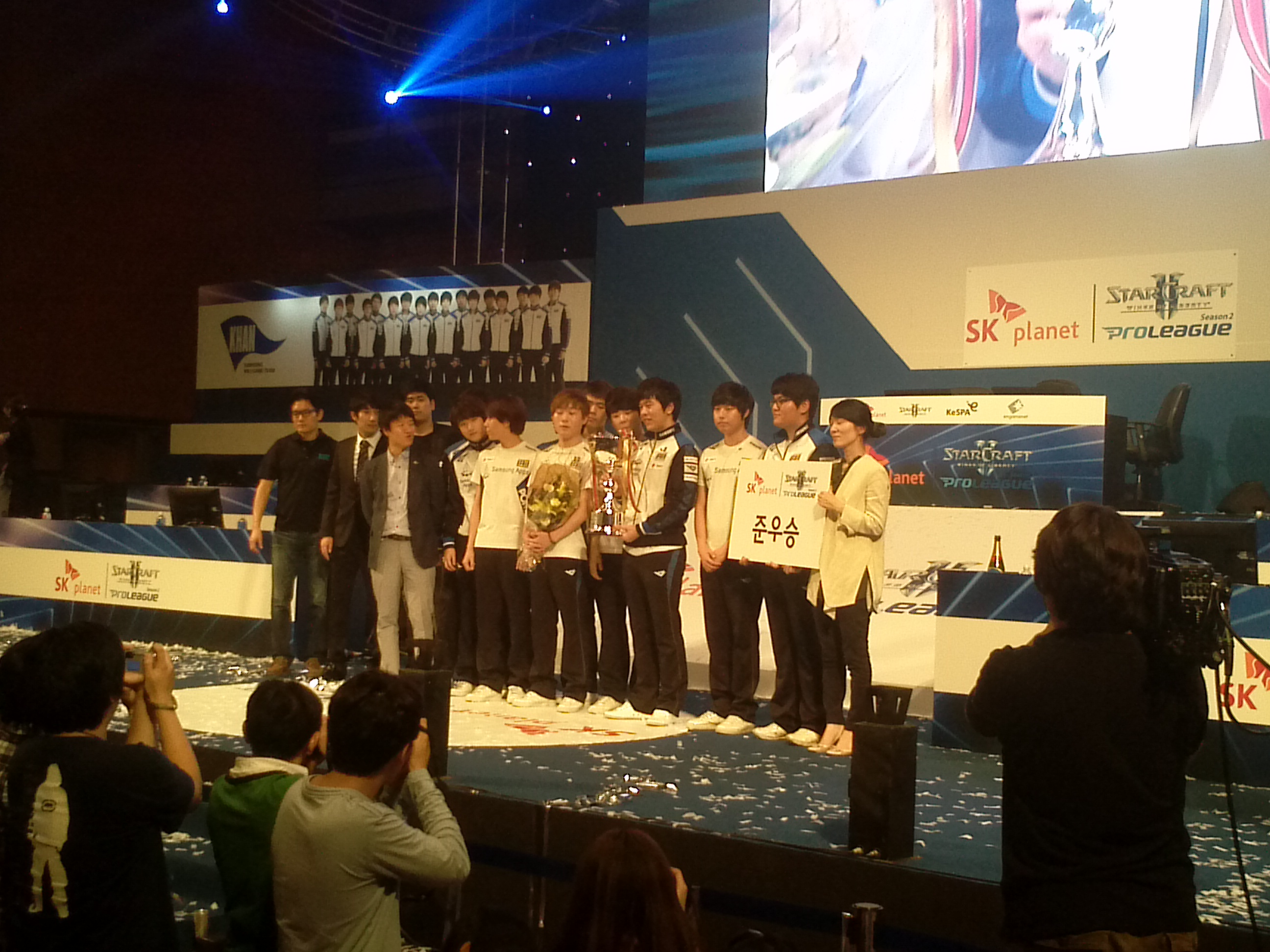
Samsung KHAN players at the StarCraft II Proleague in 2012

Samsung Galaxy Pro-Game Team, or simply Samsung Galaxy (SSG, Korean: 삼성 갤럭시) and formerly known as Samsung KHAN, was a professional esports works team of Samsung Sports, owned by Samsung Electronics via sub-company Cheil Worldwide. In September 2013, the team was renamed after Samsung Electronics' famous smartphone series.

During its existence it had teams competing in League of Legends, StarCraft and StarCraft II.

== History ==
=== StarCraft ===
Samsung KHAN was founded in June 2000 as an esports team of StarCraft/StarCraft II and competing in StarCraft II Proleague. They won 2008 season. Samsung's StarCraft II division was disbanded in 2016, due to Proleague was discontinued.

=== League of Legends ===
Samsung's League of Legends division was created on September 7, 2013 and competing in League of Legends Champions Korea (LCK), after MVP's two teams, MVP Blue and MVP Ozone (formerly MVP White), were acquired by Samsung as Samsung Blue (SSB) and Samsung Ozone (later Samsung White - SSW). Samsung White won the 2014 World Championship, while Samsung Blue finished at semifinals.

The two teams later merged due to "one organization - one pro team" rules by Riot Games for every top leagues. Samsung Galaxy went on to finish as the runners-up of the 2016 World Championship and the champions of the 2017 World Championship.

After 2017 Worlds, Samsung Galaxy's rosters and LCK spot later was acquired by KSV Esports, now Gen.G, which was founded in August 2017. However, the legitimacy of Gen.G inheriting Samsung Galaxy's titles and trophies remains controversial, especially 2014 Worlds' title, due to Samsung Galaxy or owner Samsung Electronics has made no official announcement about retaining or transferring the titles, included the two world championships' trophies Summoner's Cup.

== Tournament results ==
=== StarCraft ===
- 2008 — Shinhan Bank StarCraft Pro League Champions

=== League of Legends ===
- Ongamenet League of Legends Champions Spring 2014 — 1st
- 2014 League of Legends World Championship — 1st (Samsung White), 3rd (Samsung Blue)
- 2016 League of Legends World Championship — 2nd
- 2017 League of Legends World Championship — 1st

Awards and achievements
| Preceded by SK Telecom T1; SK Telecom T1 | League of Legends World Championship winner 2014; 2017 | Succeeded by SK Telecom T1; Invictus Gaming |
| Preceded by SK Telecom T1 | League of Legends Champions Korea winner Spring 2014 | Succeeded by KT Rolster Arrows |
