= OGN (TV channel) =

- Country: South Korea
- Headquarters: Gangnam-gu, Seoul

Programming
- Language: Korean
- Picture format: 1080i

Ownership
- Owner: On-Media (2000–09); CJ ENM Entertainment Division (2009–22); OP.GG (2022–present)

History
- Launched: July 24, 2000
- Former names: Ongamenet (until July 23, 2015)

OGN (formerly known as Ongamenet) is a South Korean pay television channel that specialized in broadcasting video game-related content and esports matches, particularly StarCraft, Starcraft II, League of Legends, and Overwatch. OGN ran high level professional tournaments for 20 years; its premier competition included the Ongamenet Starleague (OSL), Proleague, League of Legends Champions Korea, and Overwatch APEX. It was previously a subsidiary of On-Media, the parent company of several other cable channels. After a corporate merger in 2010, it became a part of CJ ENM E&M Division. Most recently, League of Legends statistics website, OP.GG, which also sponsored LCK since 2022, has acquired OGN from CJ ENM following the shutdown of the linear TV network during the COVID-19 pandemic.

== Effects on Esports ==
Originally starting out as a television program to follow the raising popularity of StarCraft in Korea, the successful growth of broadcast-gaming in Korea allowed the Starleague in 2000 to become its own dedicated channel on OnGameNet. Starting out with a small prize sum and very few followers, Starleague grew tremendously in its twelve-year history. It catapulted electronic gaming into a major competitive sport in Korea, with more viewers than some other professional sports. These Starleague events regularly attracted upwards of 50,000 fans. With the growth of esports, international teams began to come to Korea in order to participate in these events and have a chance at achieving stardom while also landing a professional contract with major teams such as SK Telecom T1 and KT Rolster. South Korea was the first country to fully popularize esports and bring it into the mainstream culture.

== Tournaments ==
=== Ongamenet Starleague ===
The Ongamenet Starleague (OSL) was a semi annual StarCraft tournament broadcast by OnGameNet. The Starleague dated back to 1999, but it was not until 2001 that the tournaments became a professional setting. Being the oldest professional StarCraft tournament in Korea, the Starleague was considered by many to be the most prestigious StarCraft tournament in the world. During the first OSL Guillaume "Grrrr..." Patry would be the first and only non-Korean to win an individual Starleague since its inception.

There had been a total of 34 OSLs for StarCraft: Brood War dating from October 1999 to August 2012. As of June 2012, the StarLeague has officially transitioned to Blizzard's newest title Starcraft II.

=== Proleague ===
The Proleague was a Premier Brood War Team League and was formerly hosted on OGN and MBCGame. It was then solely hosted on OGN after MBC closed down its gaming venture. The Proleague allowed for fans to follow their favorite team or player. It also allowed up and coming amateurs to participate in a televised setting.

There were a total of 31 Proleague events for Starcraft: Brood War from March 2003 to September 2012. As of December 2012, the Proleague moved on to Starcraft II. This marked the first time since the inception of the Proleague that a non-Korean team participated in the event with the collaboration between Evil Geniuses and Team Liquid.

=== The Champions / League of Legends Champions Korea ===
The Champions was the highest level of League of Legends competition in Korea from 2012 to 2015. The tournament officially launched in March 2012 and lasted until 2015, when The Champions was rebranded to League of Legends Champions Korea (LCK). Soon after, controversy sparked when League of Legends developer Riot Games declared that the broadcasting rights of the LCK would be split between OGN and its main competitor, SPOTV. Many fans were disappointed by the controversial decision to split time between OGN and SPOTV because of SPOTV's lack of experience in esports broadcasting and OGN's long commitment to fostering the esports scene in Korea and being frontrunners in the esports industry as a whole. In 2019, OGN's operation of the LCK broadcast was terminated by Riot Games when it was decided that the LCK would become an in-house, first-party broadcast, produced directly by Riot Games. This transition coincided with the construction and opening of LoL Park, a new stadium and studio that would function as the new location of all LCK competition.

=== Overwatch APEX ===
Overwatch APEX was the first premier tournament series in South Korea for Overwatch esports and is the place where many players in the later Overwatch League found early success. The first season began in late 2016, and each tournament season took place over the course of several months, with breaks in play between each consecutive season. For its short, year-long reign, the APEX tournaments were regarded as the highest level of Overwatch competition at the time. For the first three seasons, four western teams were invited each season to compete with 12 teams from Korea. In July, 2017, it was announced that no more Western teams would be invited for APEX Season 4 onwards and all teams from APEX Season 3 and the top 5 teams from Challengers Season 4 were promoted directly to APEX Season 4.

The APEX tournaments came to a close after season 4 as Blizzard's in-house Overwatch League began its first season in early 2018. OGN were not given the rights to broadcast Contenders Korea and, to establish control of all Overwatch esports activity, Blizzard placed many restrictions on third-party tournament organizers, effectively ending OGN's hopes of continuing to hosts tournaments outside of the main OWL/OWC circuit.

== See also ==
- On-Media
