= Samsung Sports =

South Korean multi-sport club

Samsung Sports 삼성스포츠
- Type: Subsidiary
- Industry: Sport
- Headquarters: Seoul, South Korea
- Area served: Worldwide
- Key people: Yoo Jung Geun (CEO of Cheil Worldwide)
- Parent: Cheil Worldwide
- Website: www.cheil.com/hq#sports_marketing

Samsung Sports is Samsung's multi-sport club and sports marketing department in South Korea.

== Own sports teams ==
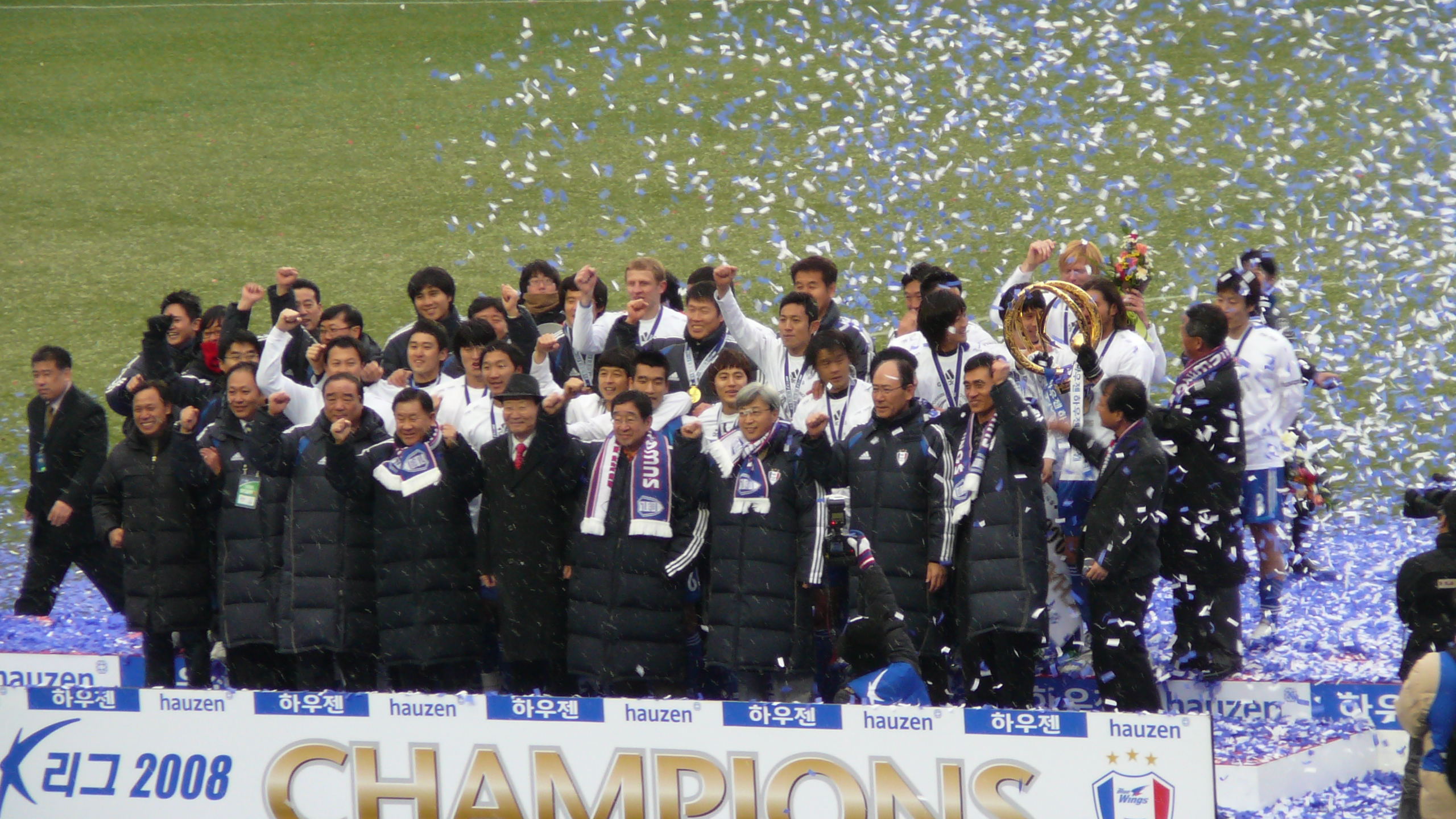
Suwon Samsung Bluewings players of 2008 K-League Champions

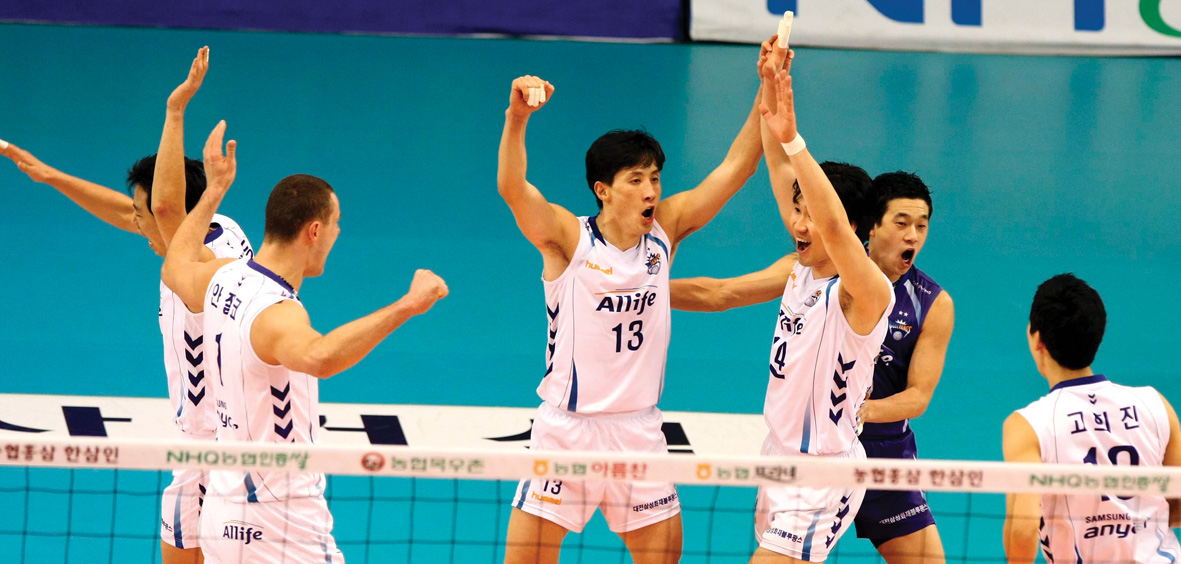
Daejeon Samsung Fire Bluefangs players

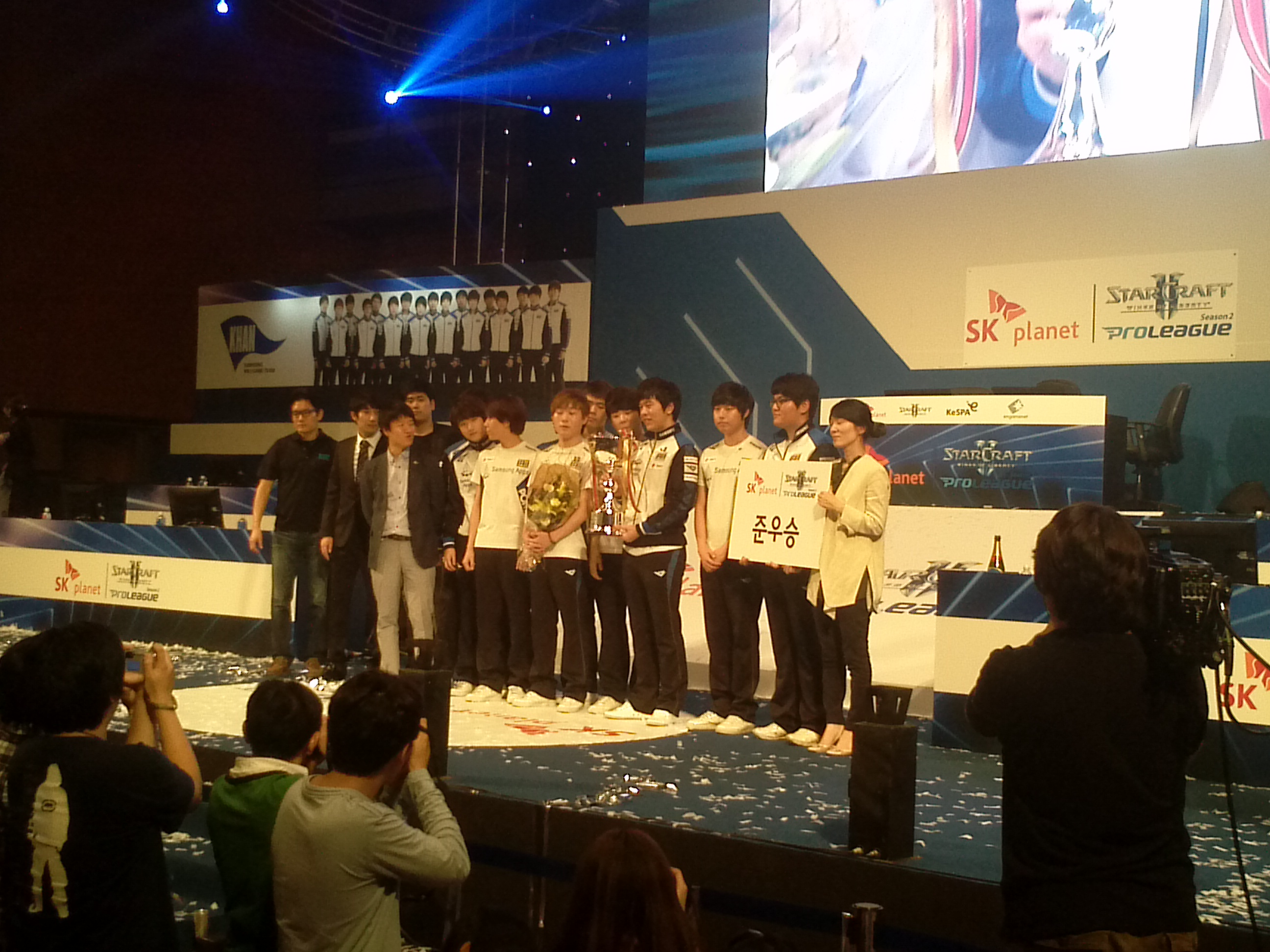
Samsung Galaxy players

=== Professional ===
Sports	League	Team	Founded	City	Venue	Notable players	Honors	Note
Football	K League 2	Suwon Samsung Bluewings	1995	Suwon, Gyeonggi	Suwon World Cup Stadium	Yeom Ki-hun, Dejan Damjanović	K League 1: 4, ACL: 2	
Baseball	KBO League	Samsung Lions	1982	Daegu	Daegu Samsung Lions Park	Kang Min-ho, Lee Seung-Yuop	KBO: 8, AS: 1	
Basketball	KBL	Seoul Samsung Thunders	1978	Seoul	Jamsil Arena	Moon Tae-young, Ricardo Ratliffe	KBL: 2	
Basketball	WKBL	Yongin Samsung Life Blueminx	1977	Yongin, Gyeonggi	Yongin Gymnasium	Huh Yoon-ja, Bae Hye-yoon	WKBL: 5	
Volleyball	V-League	Daejeon Samsung Fire Bluefangs	1995	Daejeon	Chungmu Gymnasium	Park Chul-woo, Yoo Kwang-woo	V-League: 8, AVC CC: 2	
eSports	Proleague	Samsung Galaxy	2000	Seoul	-	Kang Min-soo, Park Jin-hyuk	Proleagues: 1	Disbanded in 2016
eSports	LCK	Samsung White	2013	Seoul	-	Cho "Mata" Se-hyoung, Heo "PawN" Won-seok Choi "DanDy" In-kyu, Gu "imp" Seung-bin, Jang "Looper" Hyeong-seok	World Championships: 1	Disbanded in 2015
eSports	LCK	Samsung Blue	2013	Seoul	-	Kim "Deft" Hyuk-kyu, Lee "Spirit" Da-yoon, Choi "Acorn" Cheon-ju, Lee "Heart" Gwan-hyung, Bae "dade" Eo-jin	LCK: 1	Disbanded in 2015
eSports	LCK	Samsung Galaxy	2015	Seoul	-	Lee Min-ho, Kang Chan-yong, Park Jae-hyeok, Jo Yong-in, Lee Seong-jin	World Championships: 1	Disbanded in 2018

=== Amateur ===
Sports	Parent company	Team	Founded	Training ground	Notable players	Note
Equestrian	Samsung Electronics	Samsung Electronics Equestrian Club	1988	Samsung Equestrian Center	Choi Joon-sang	Disbanded in 2010
Athletics	Samsung Electronics	Samsung Electronics Athletic Club	2000	Challenge Camp	Lee Bong-ju	
Rugby	Samsung Heavy Industries	Samsung Heavy Industries Rugby Club	1995		Yoon Tae-il	Disbanded in 2015
Badminton	Samsung Life Insurance	Samsung Life Insurance Badminton Club	1996	Hanullim Gymnasium	Lee Yong-dae, Lee Hyo-jung	
Tennis	Samsung Securities	Samsung Securities Tennis Club	1992		Lee Hyung-taik, Chung Hyeon	Disbanded in 2015
Table Tennis	Samsung Life Insurance	Samsung Life Table Tennis Club	1978	Samsung Training Center	Ryu Seung-min, Joo Se-hyuk	
Wrestling	Samsung Life Insurance	Samsung Life Wrestling Club	1983	Samsung Training Center	Jung Ji-hyun, Kim Hyeon-woo	
Taekwondo	S-1 Corporation	Samsung S-1 Taekwondo Club	1997	Samsung Training Center	Moon Dae-sung	
American football	Samsung Heavy Industries	Samsung Geoje Blue Storm	1999		Jeon Hong-duck	

== Sponsorship ==
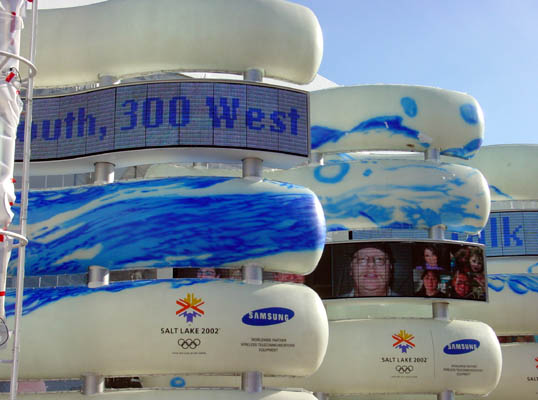
2002 Winter Olympics

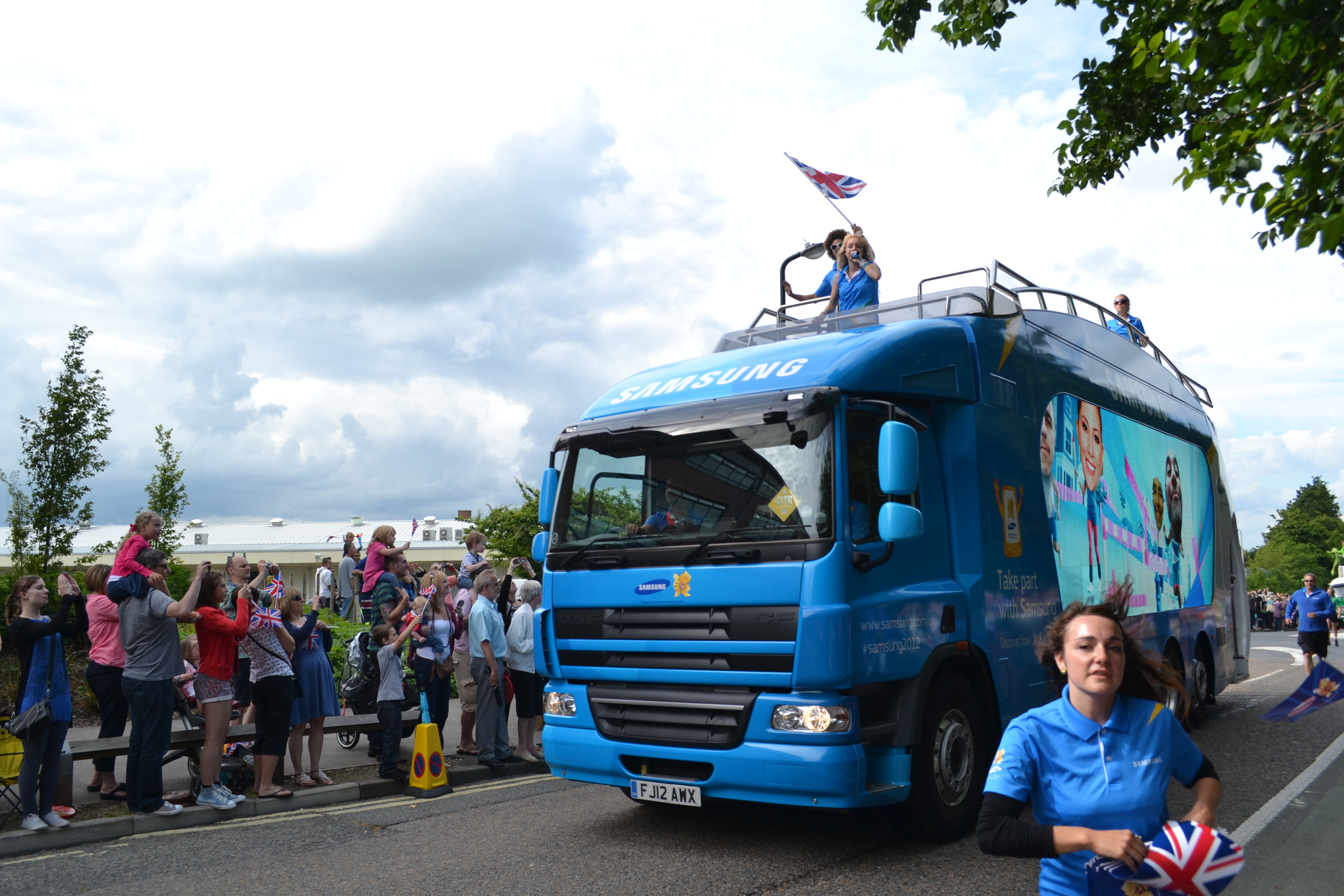
2012 Summer Olympics

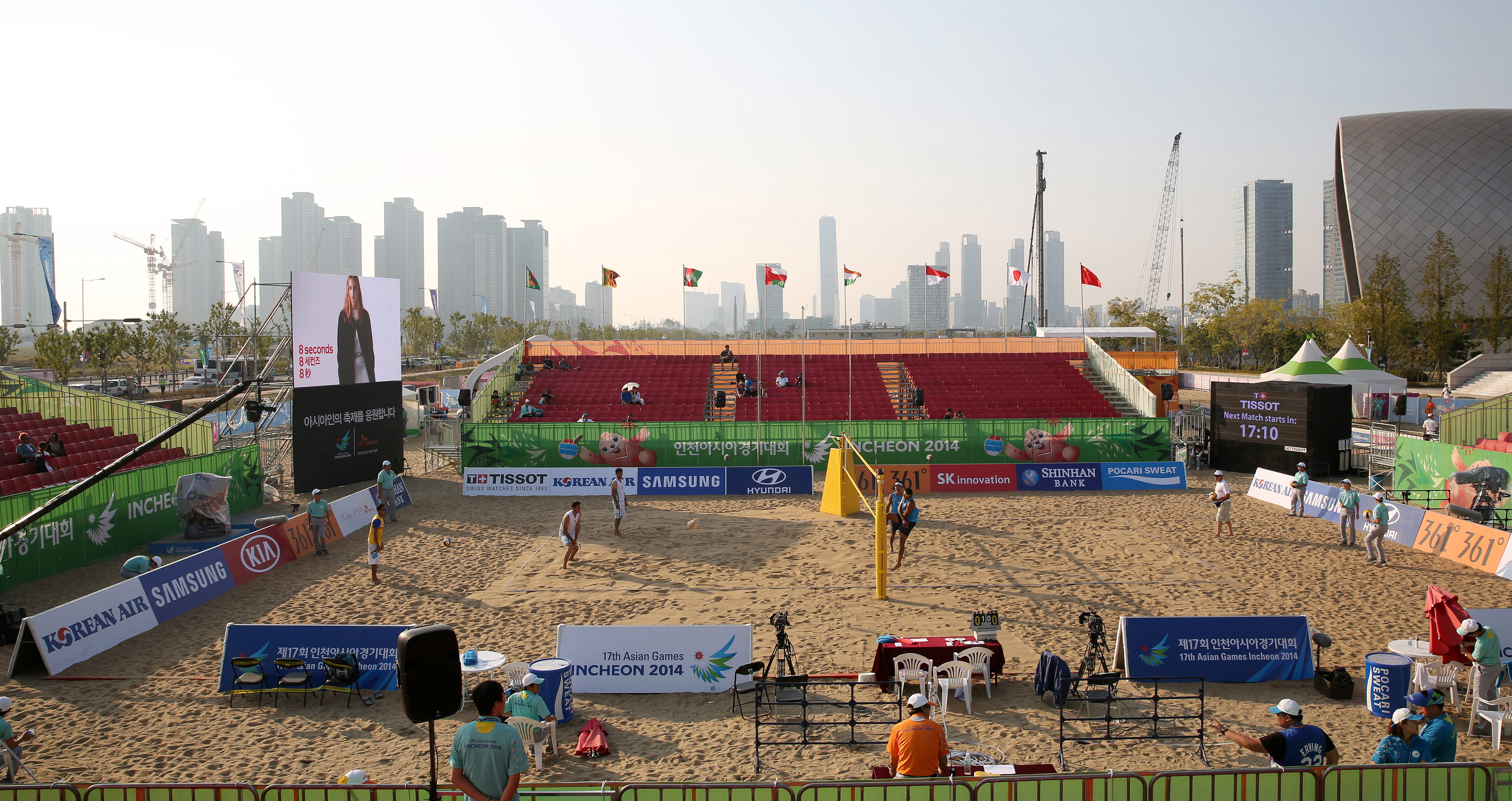
Beach volleyball at the 2014 Asian Games

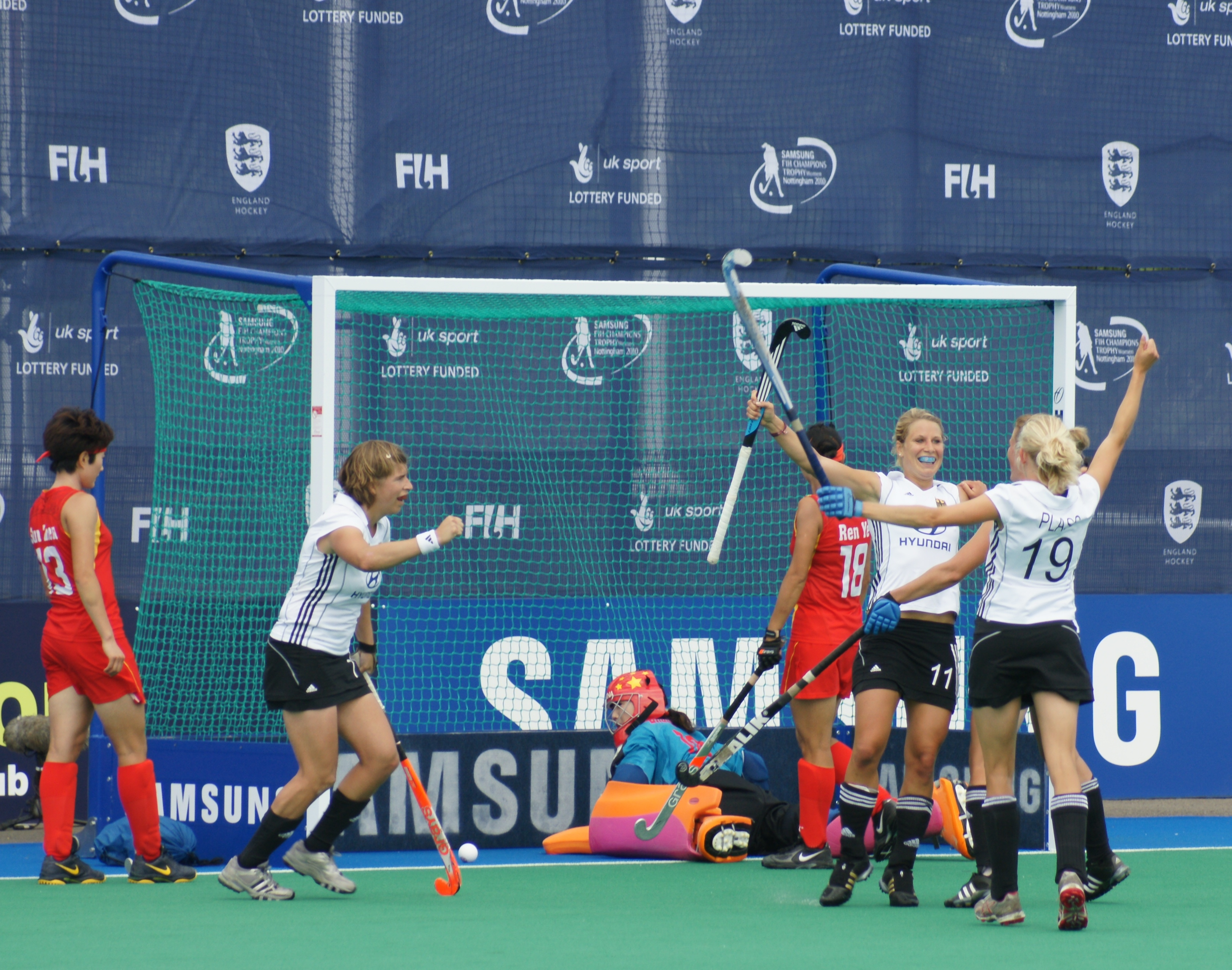
2010 Women's Hockey Champions Trophy

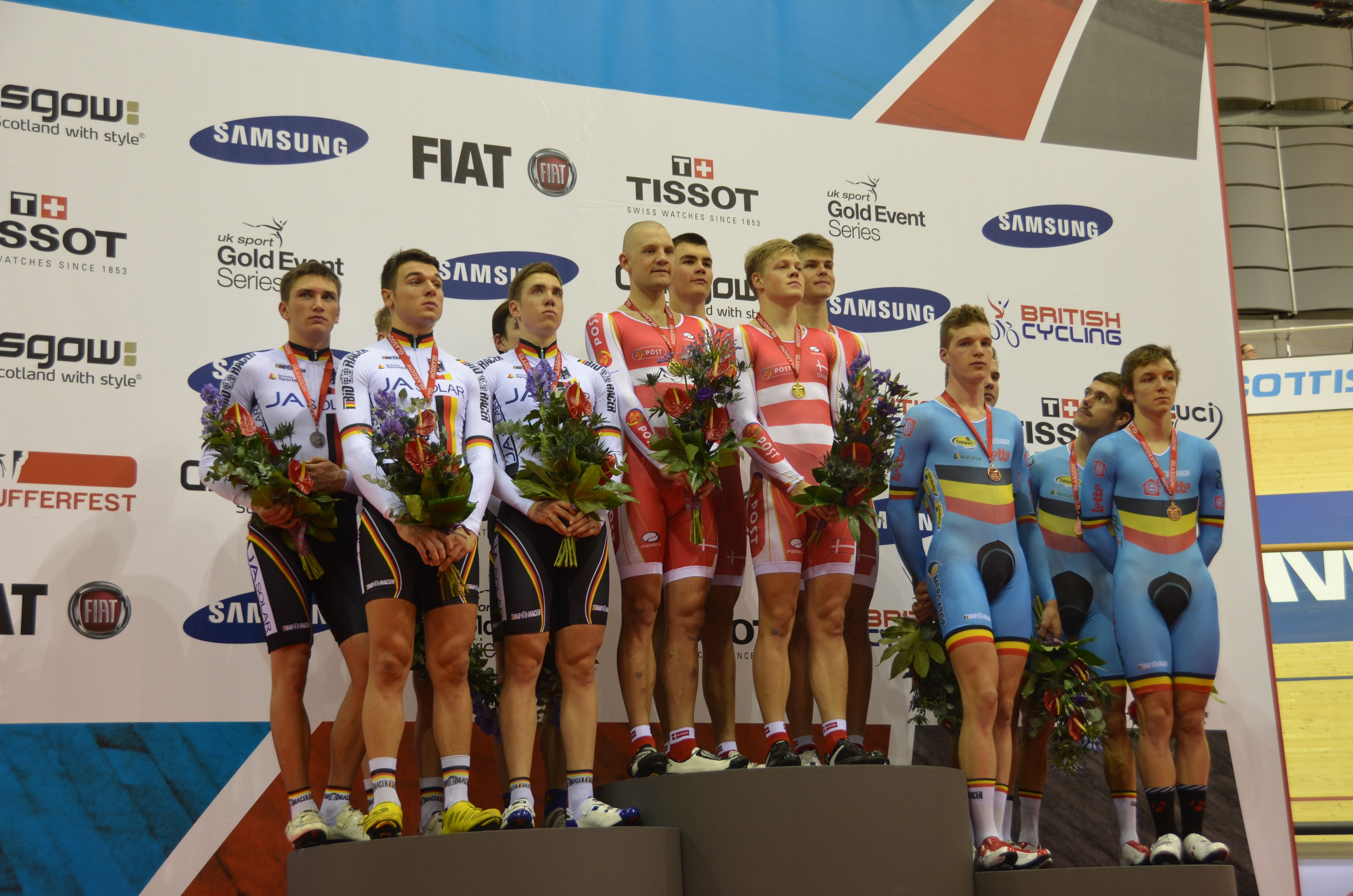
2012–13 UCI Track Cycling World Cup

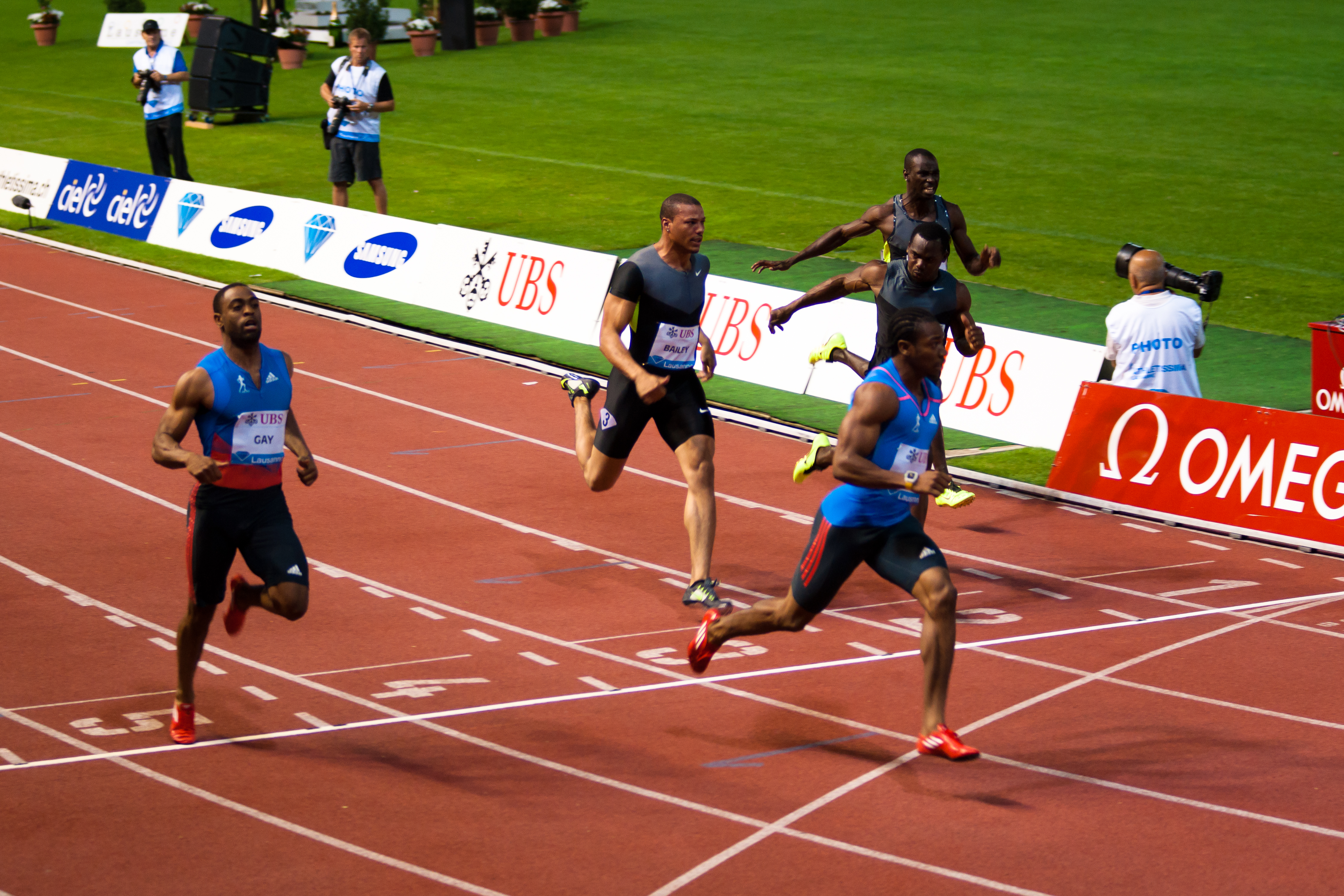
2012 IAAF Diamond League

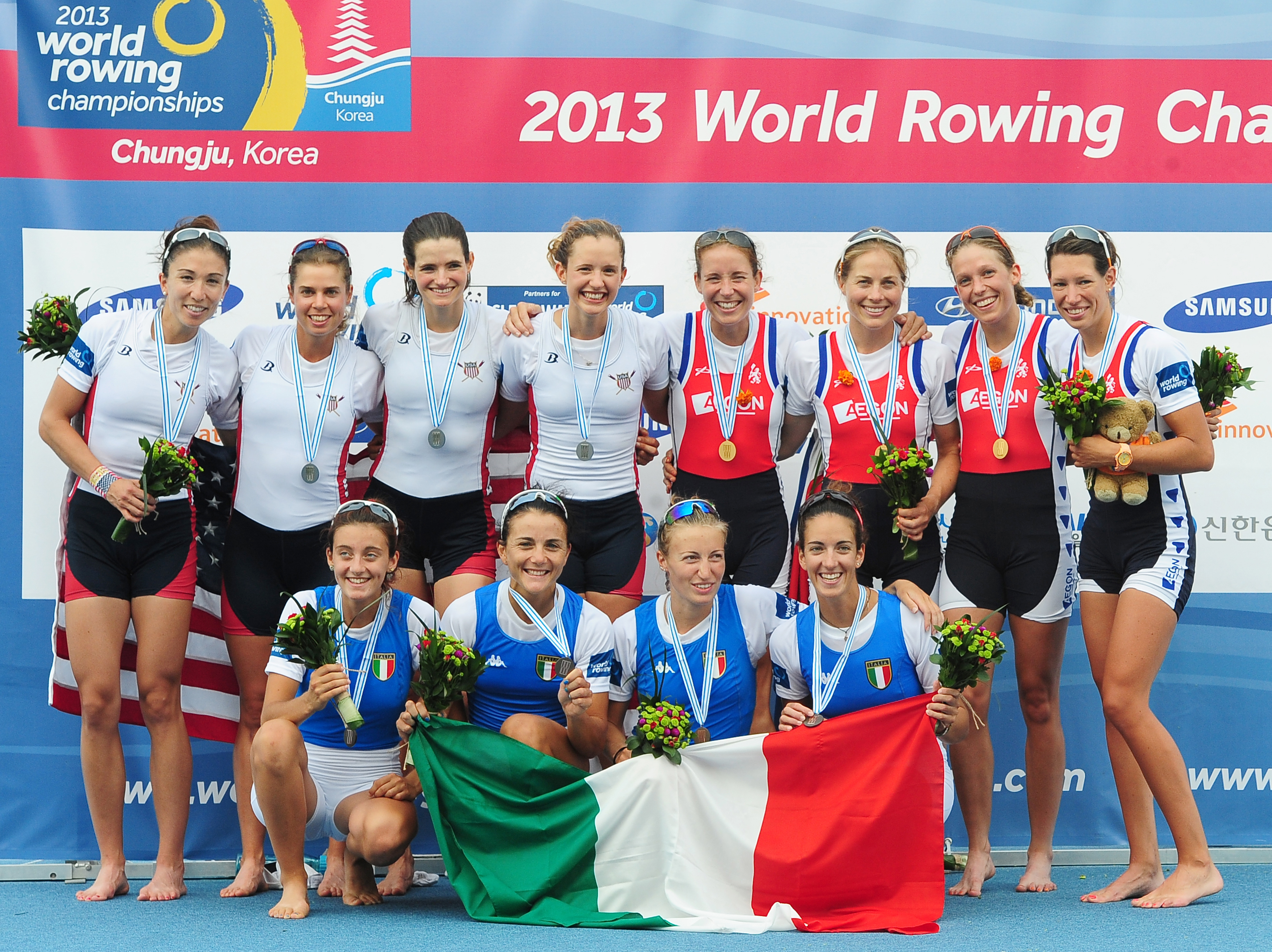
2013 World Rowing Championships

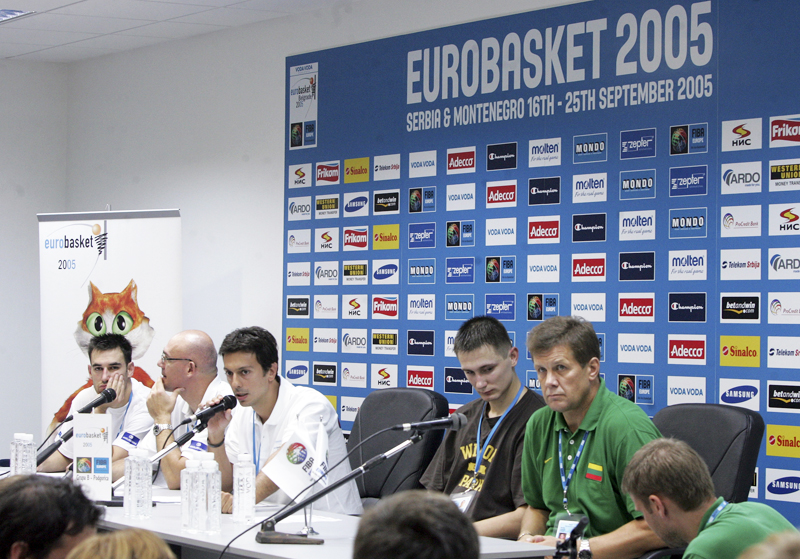
FIBA EuroBasket 2005

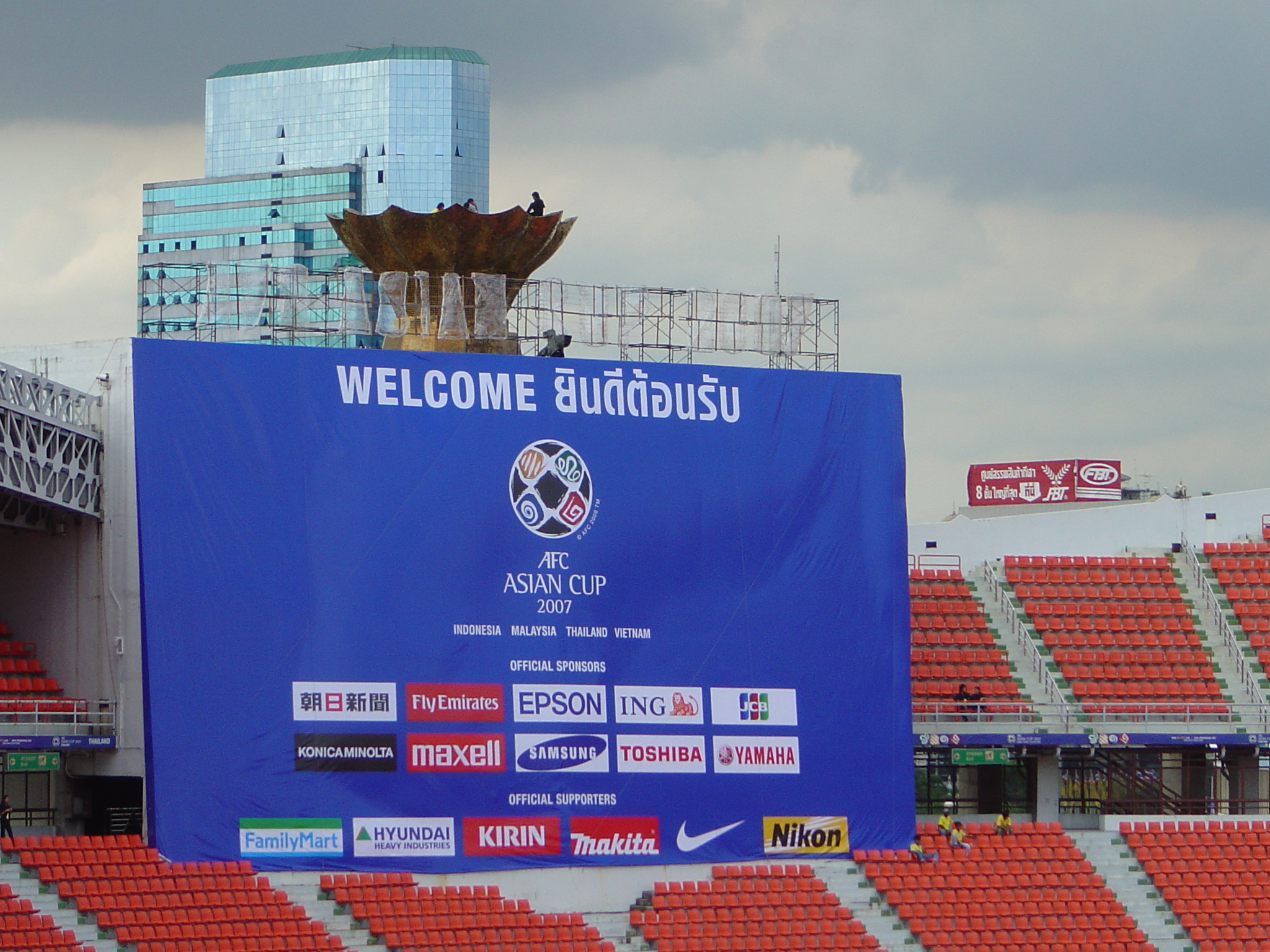
2007 AFC Asian Cup

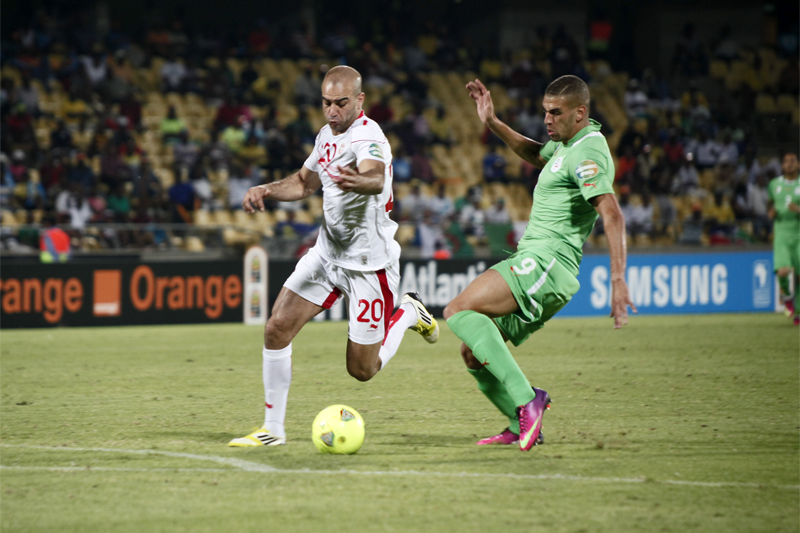
2013 Africa Cup of Nations

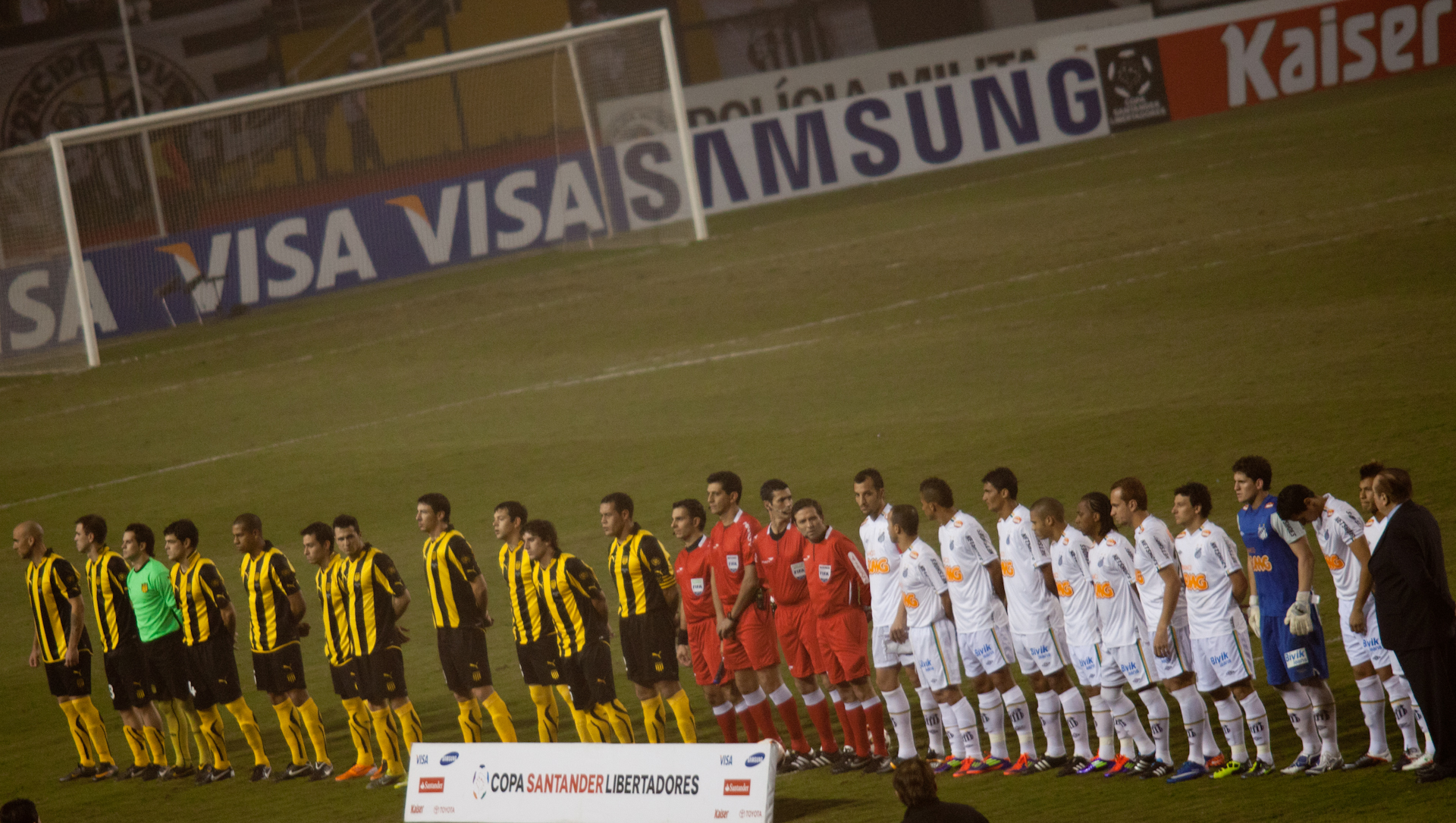
2011 Copa Libertadores

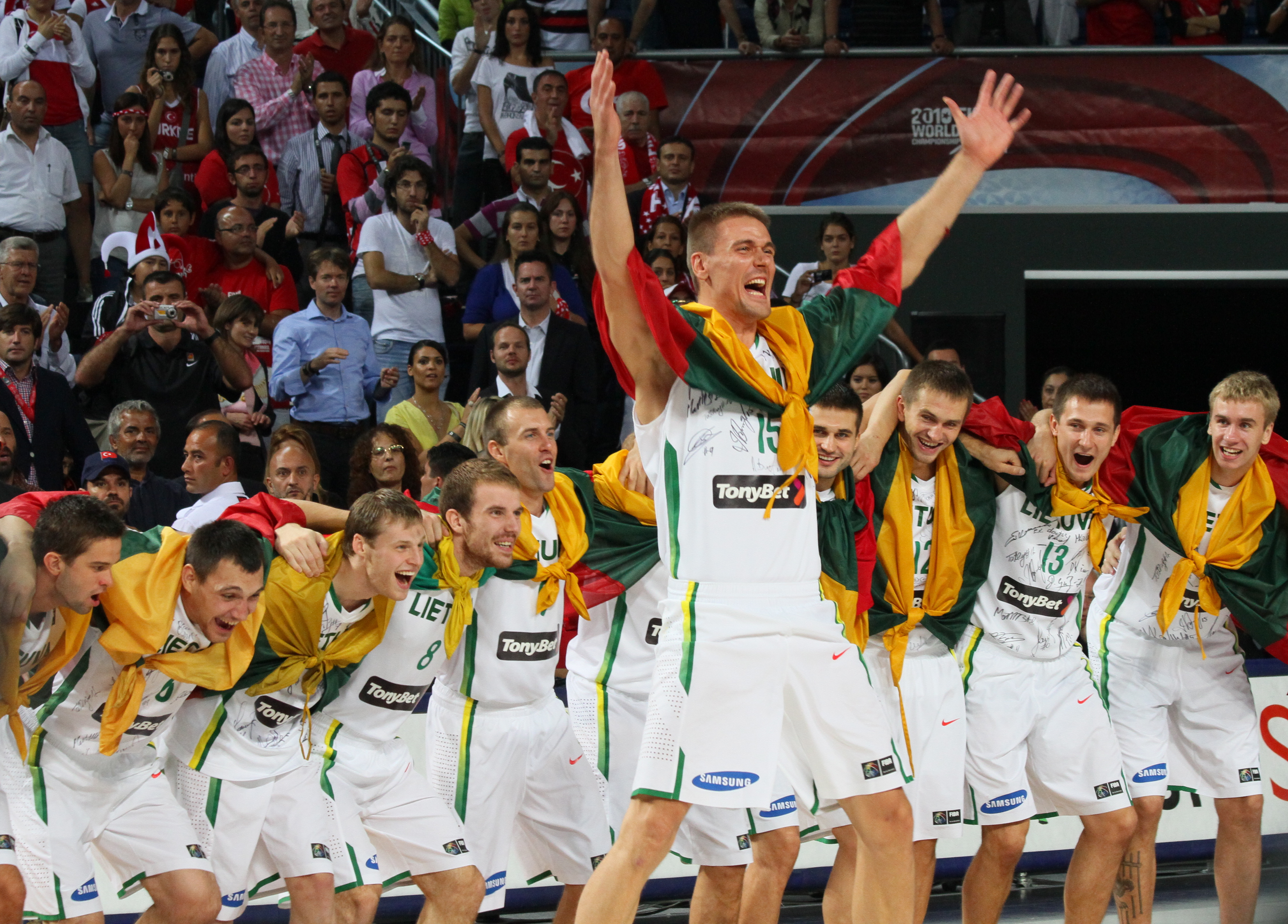
Lithuania national basketball team in 2010

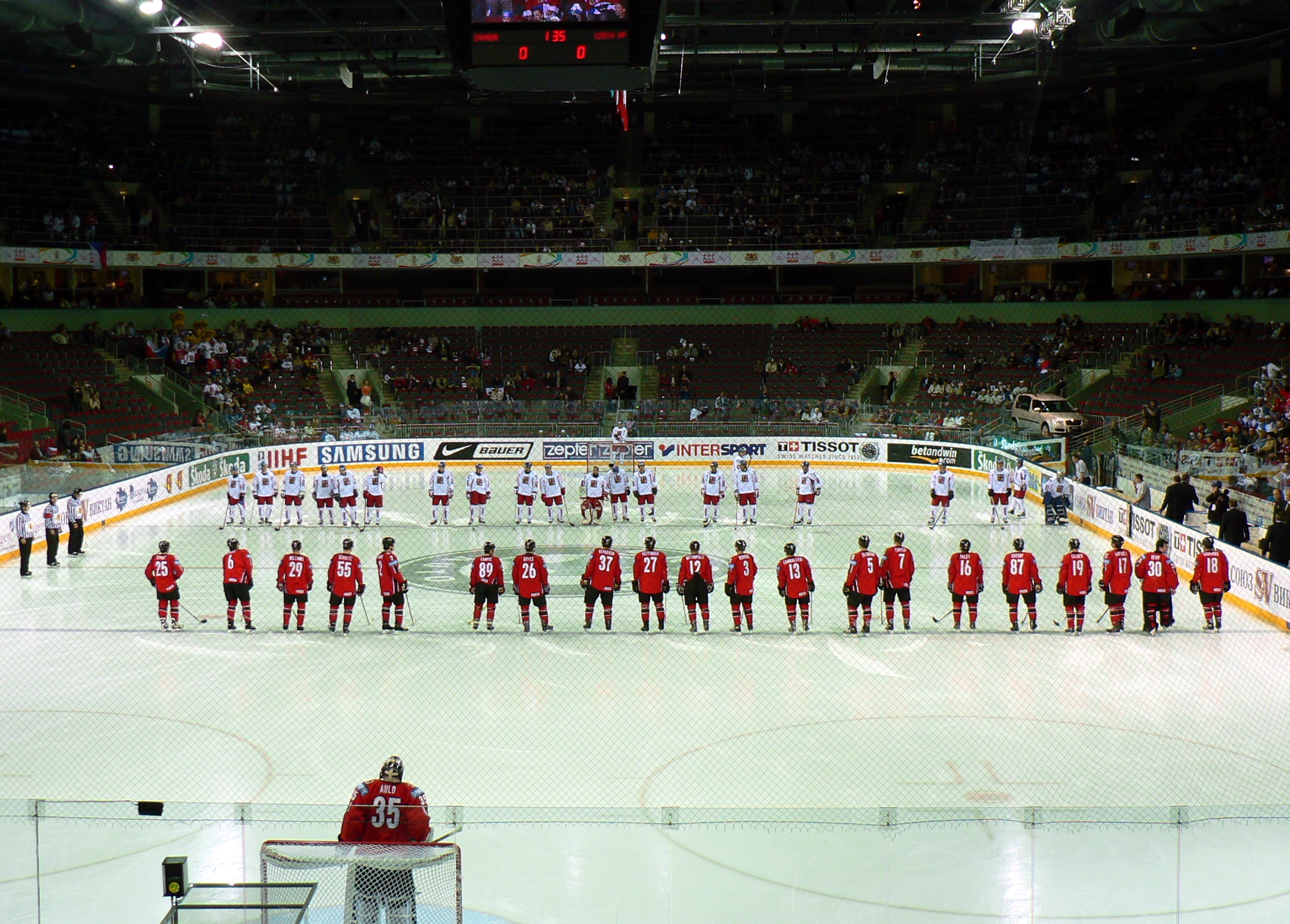
Canada national ice hockey team in 2006

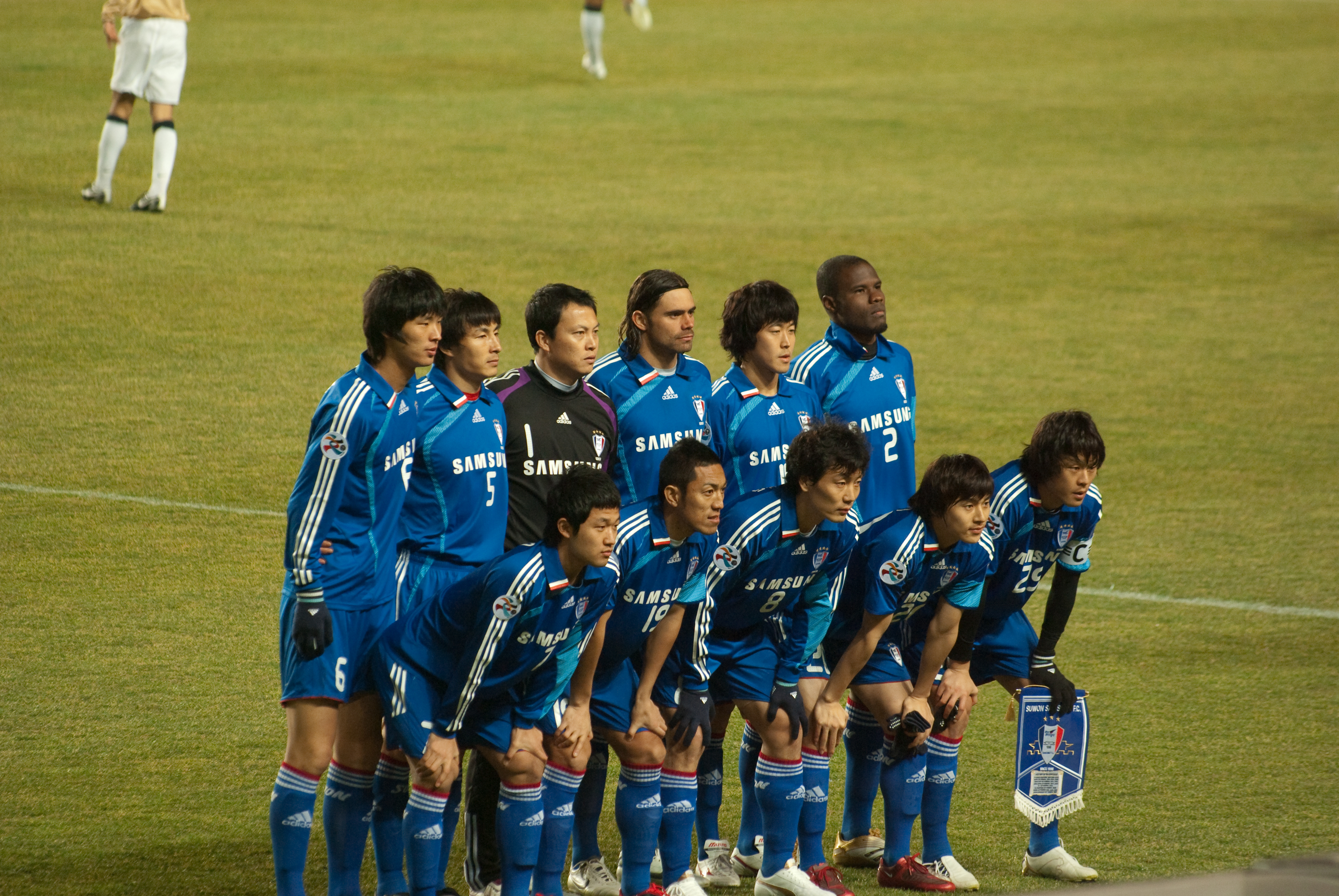
Suwon Samsung Bluewings players wearing Samsung printed kit in ACL 2009

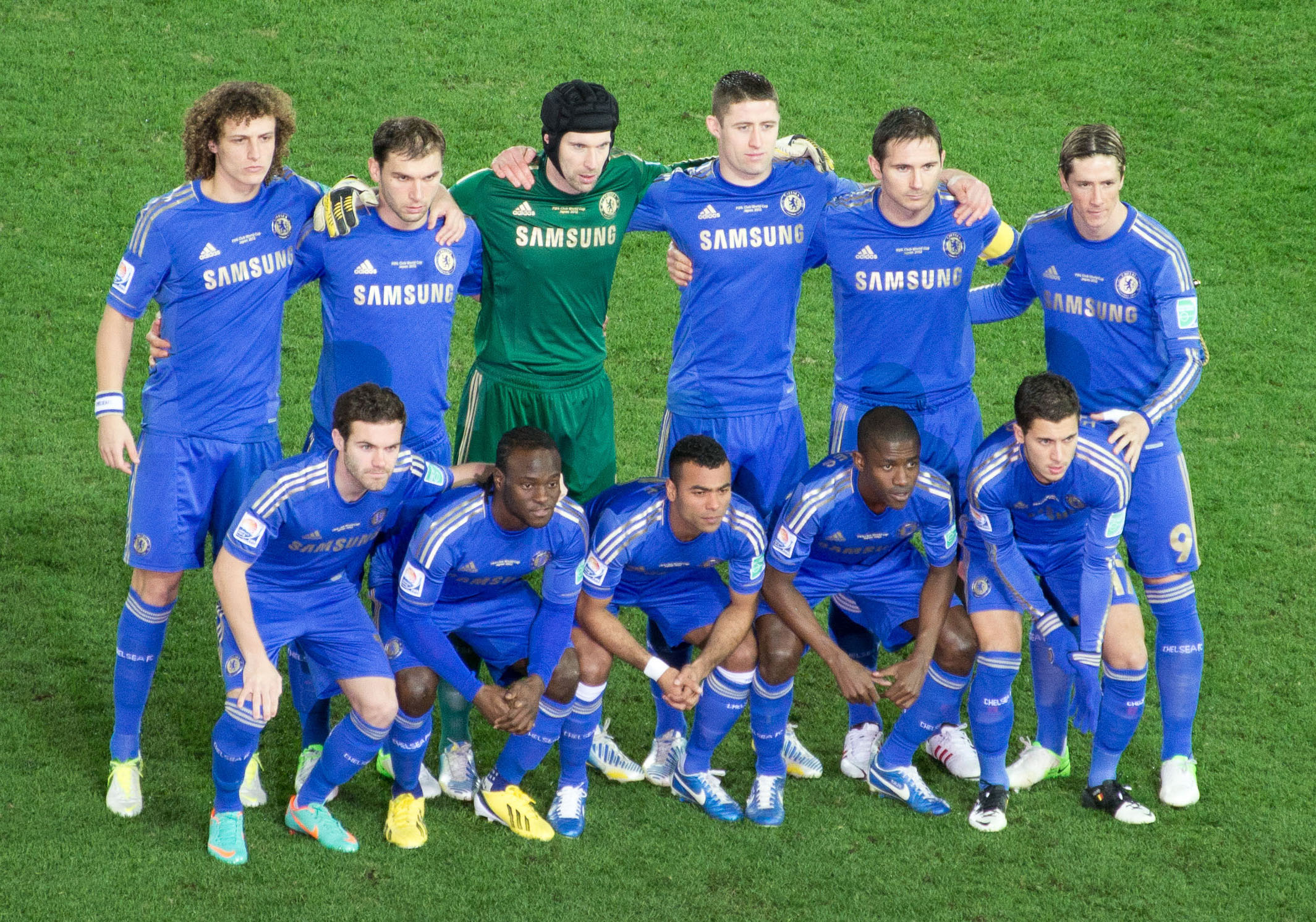
Chelsea FC in 2012

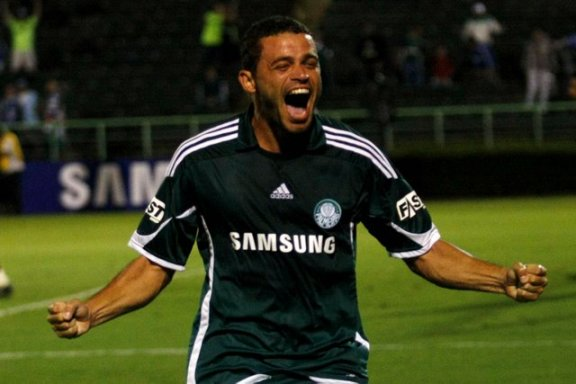
SE Palmeiras in 2010

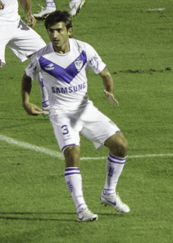
Vélez Sarsfield in 2013

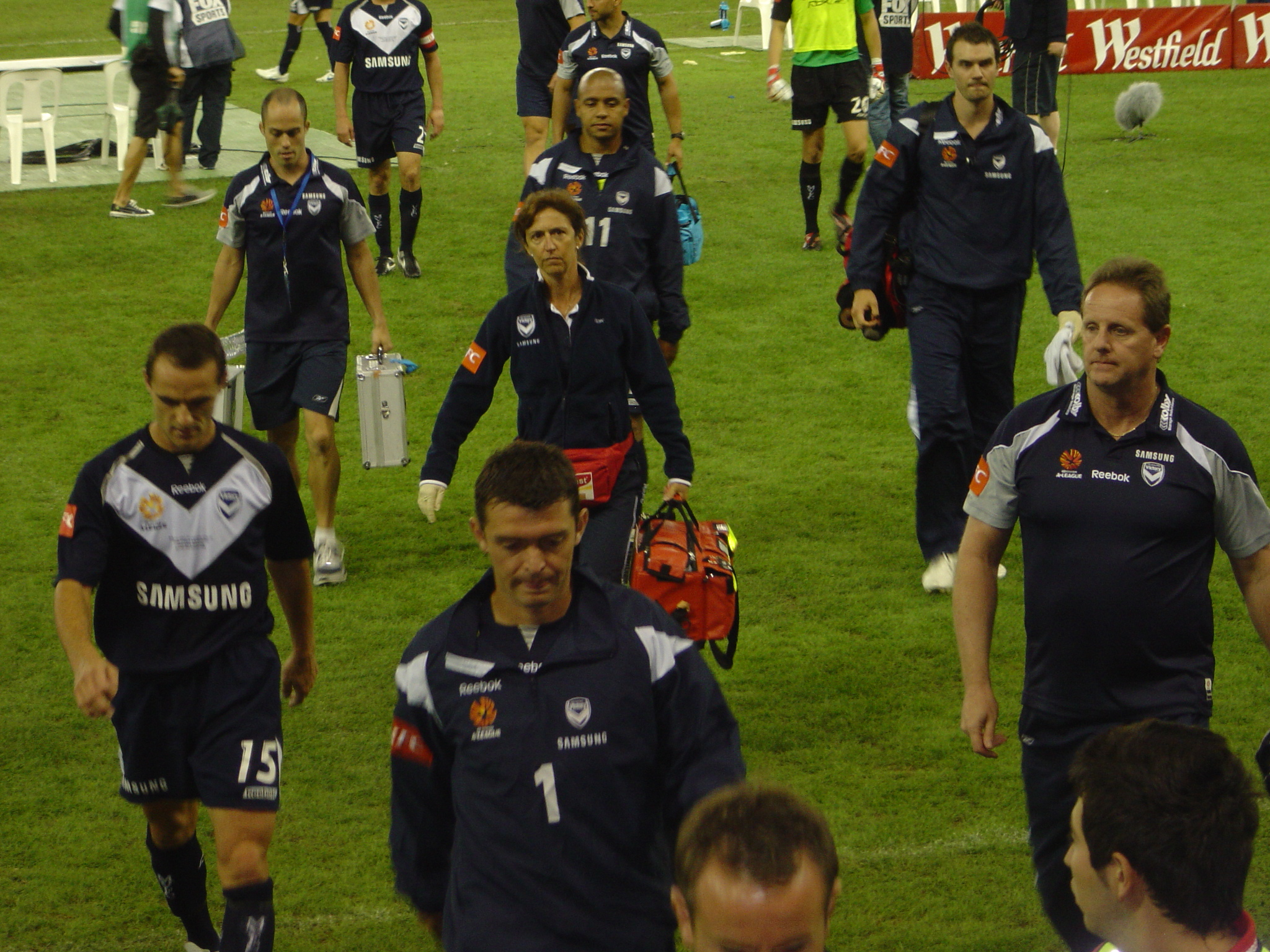
Melbourne Victory FC in 2009

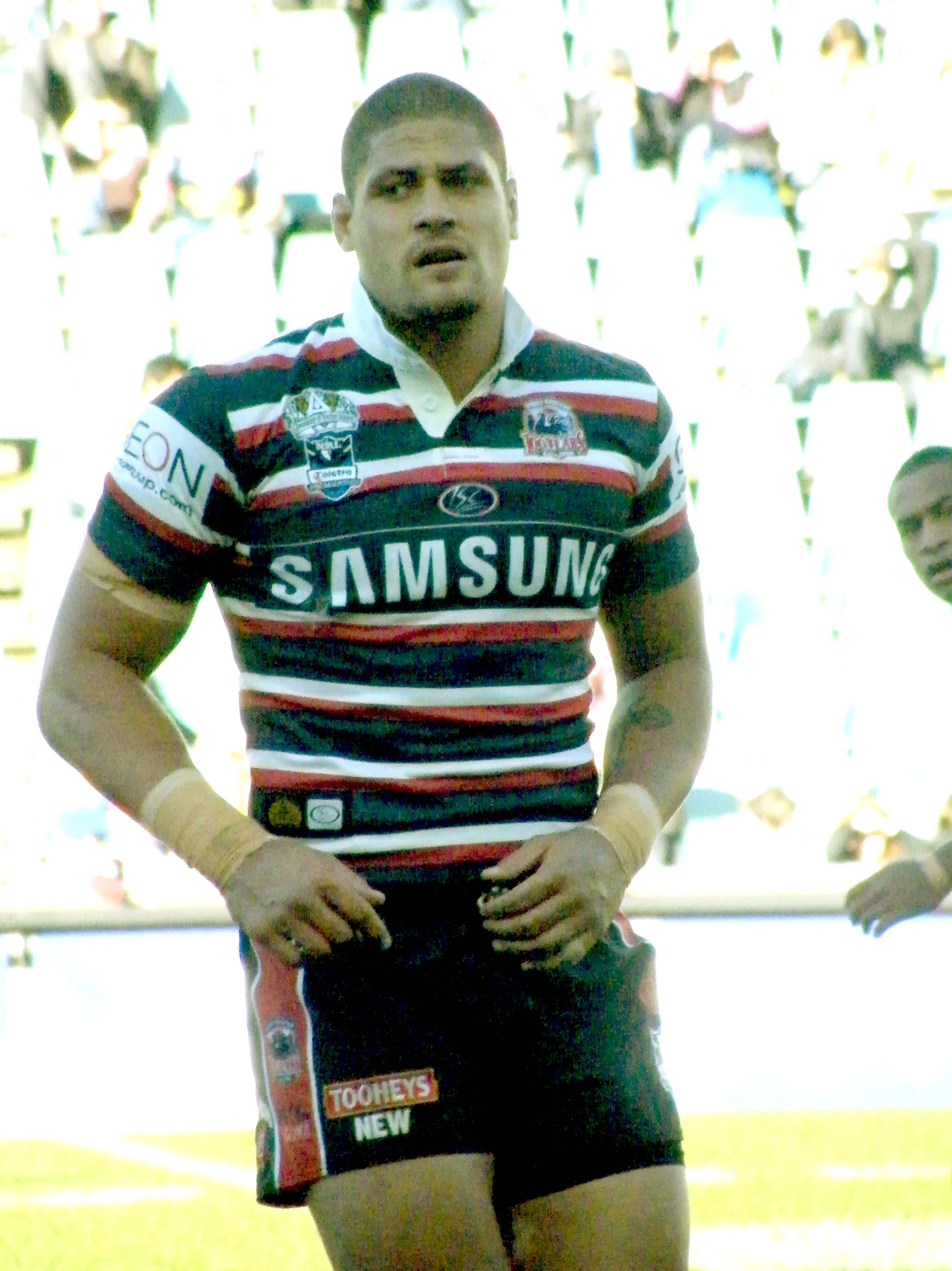
Sydney Roosters in 2008

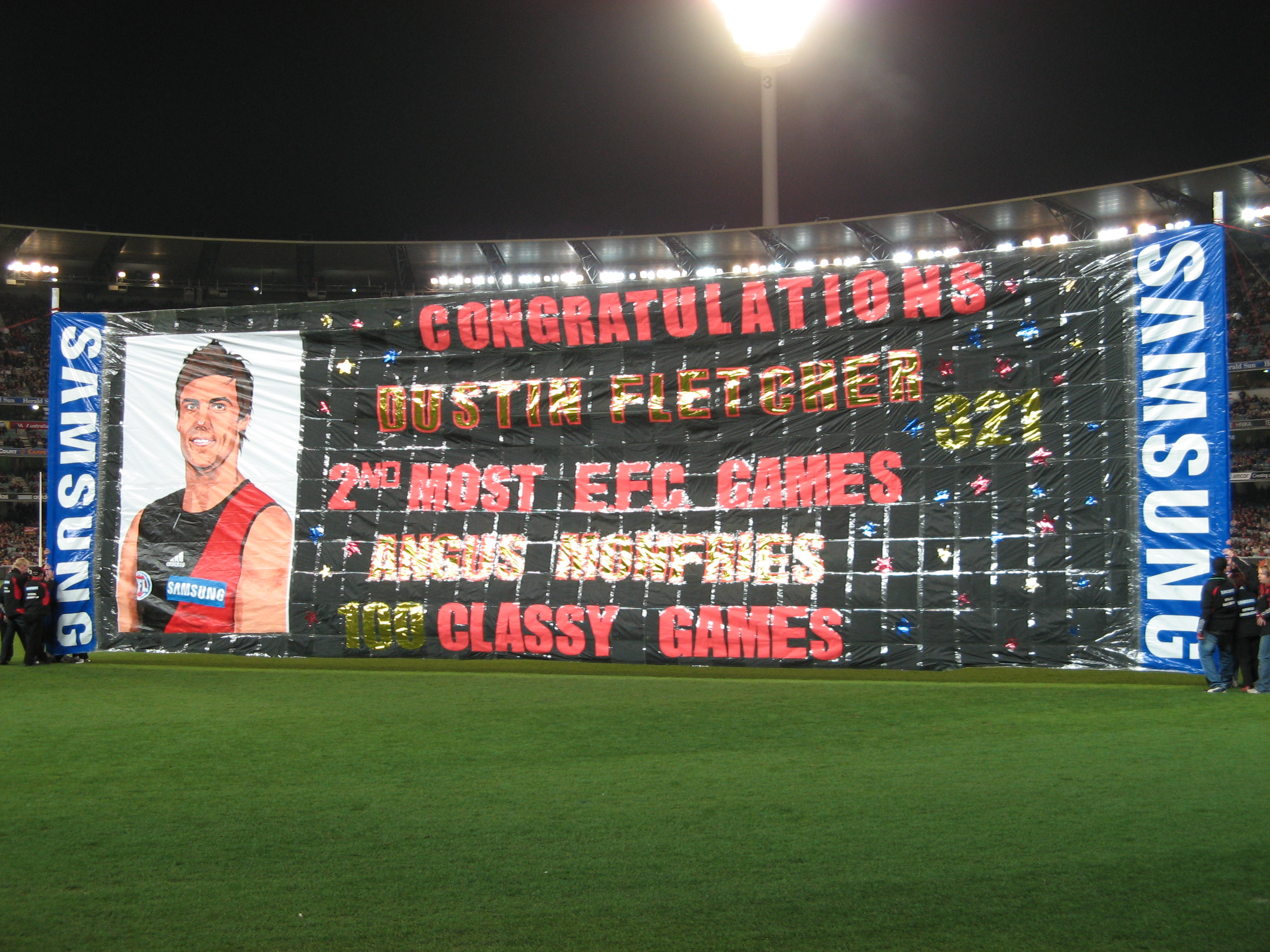
Essendon Football Club in 2010

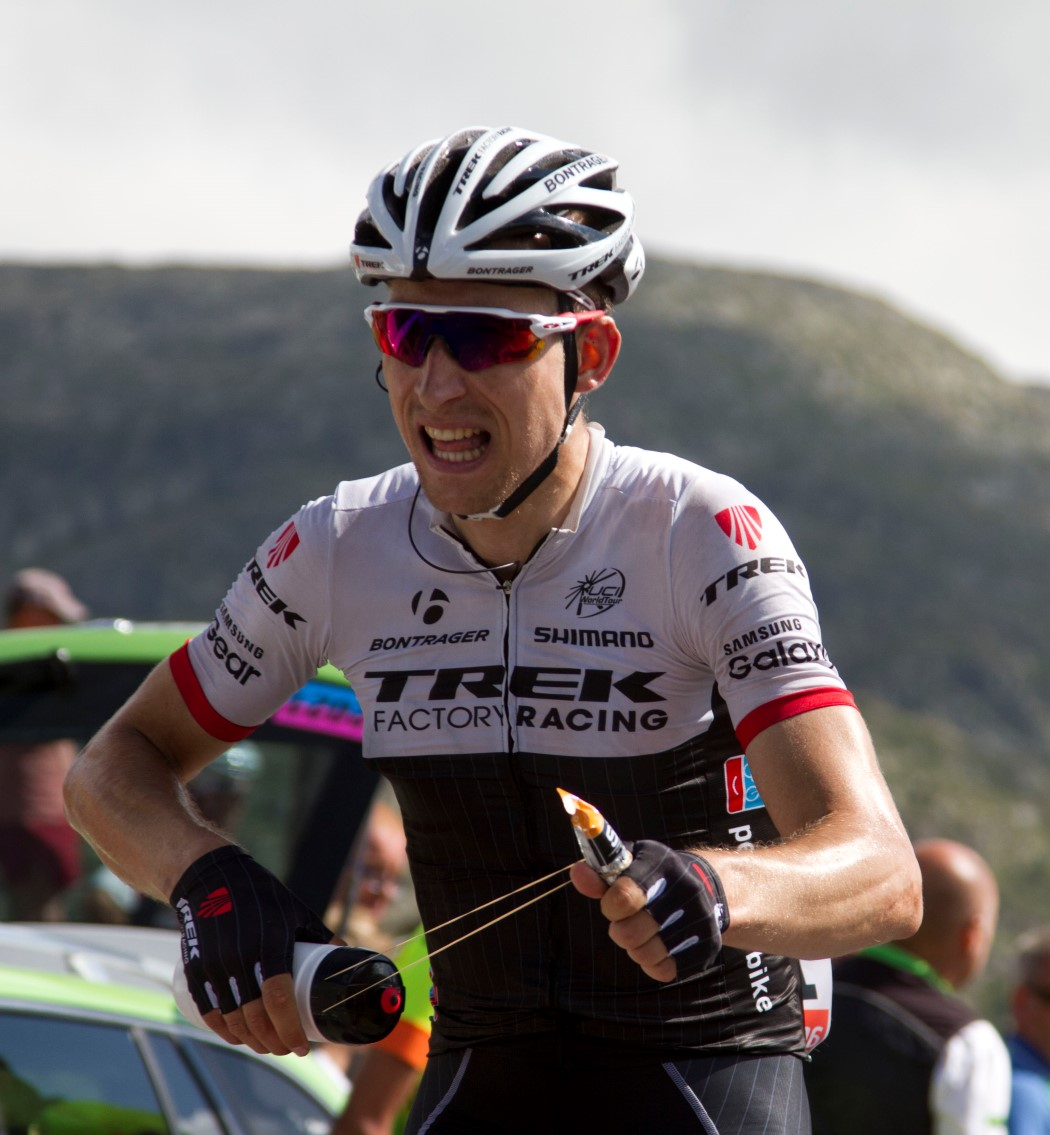
Trek Factory Racing in 2015

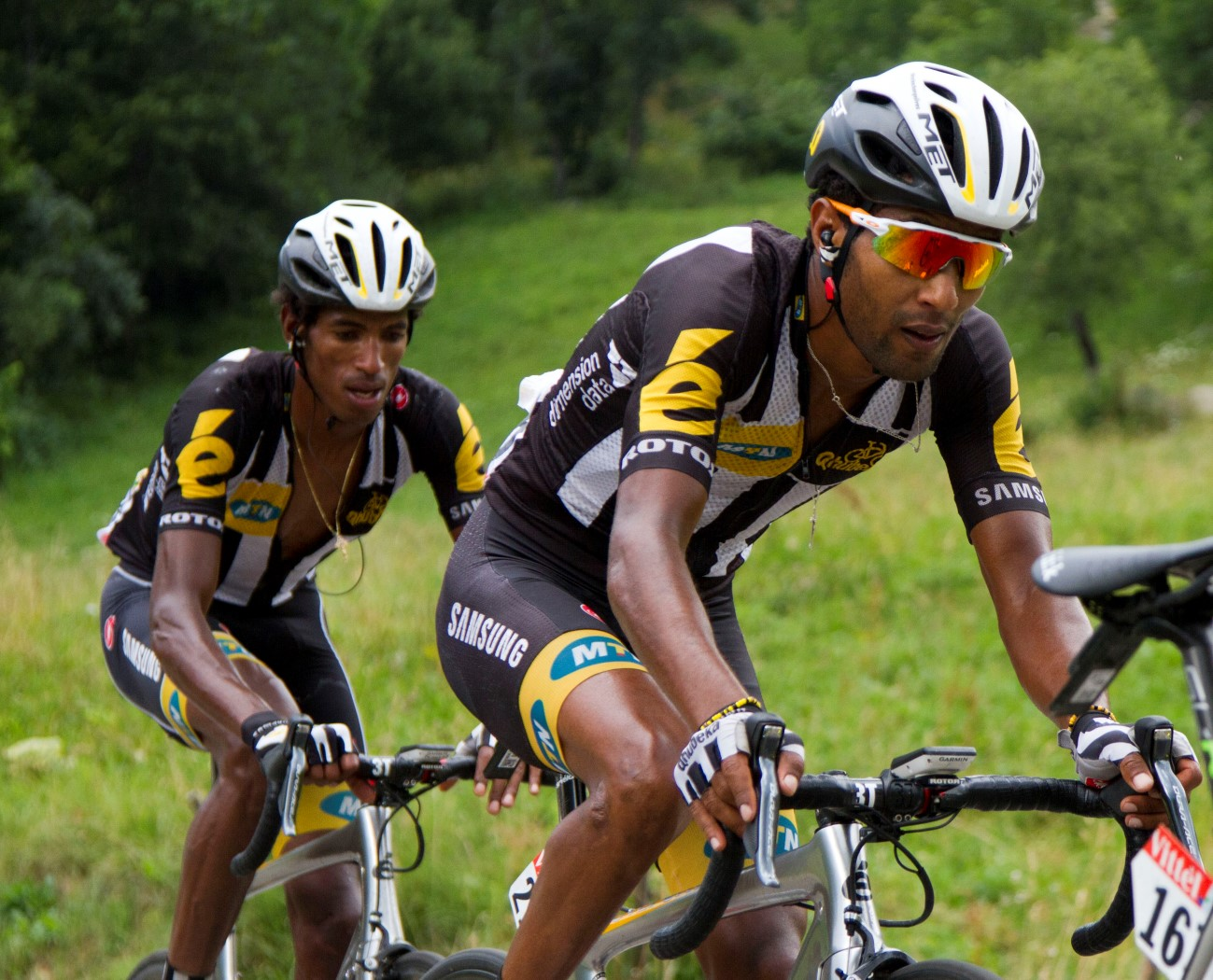
MTN-Qhubeka in 2015

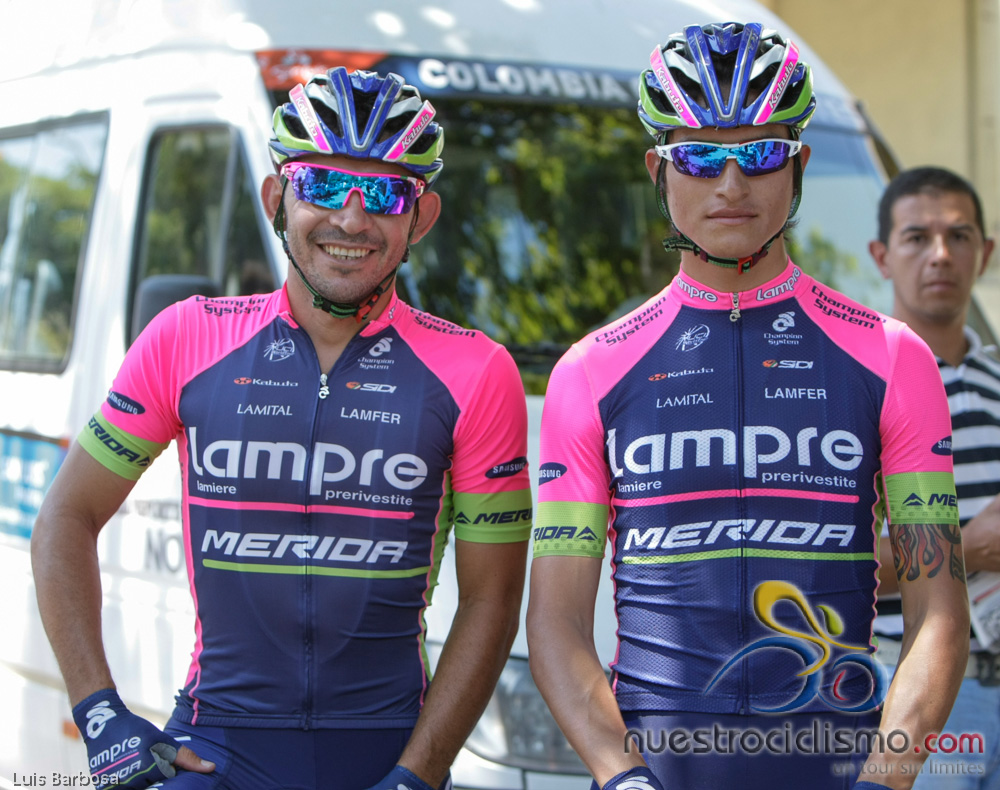
Lampre-Merida in 2014

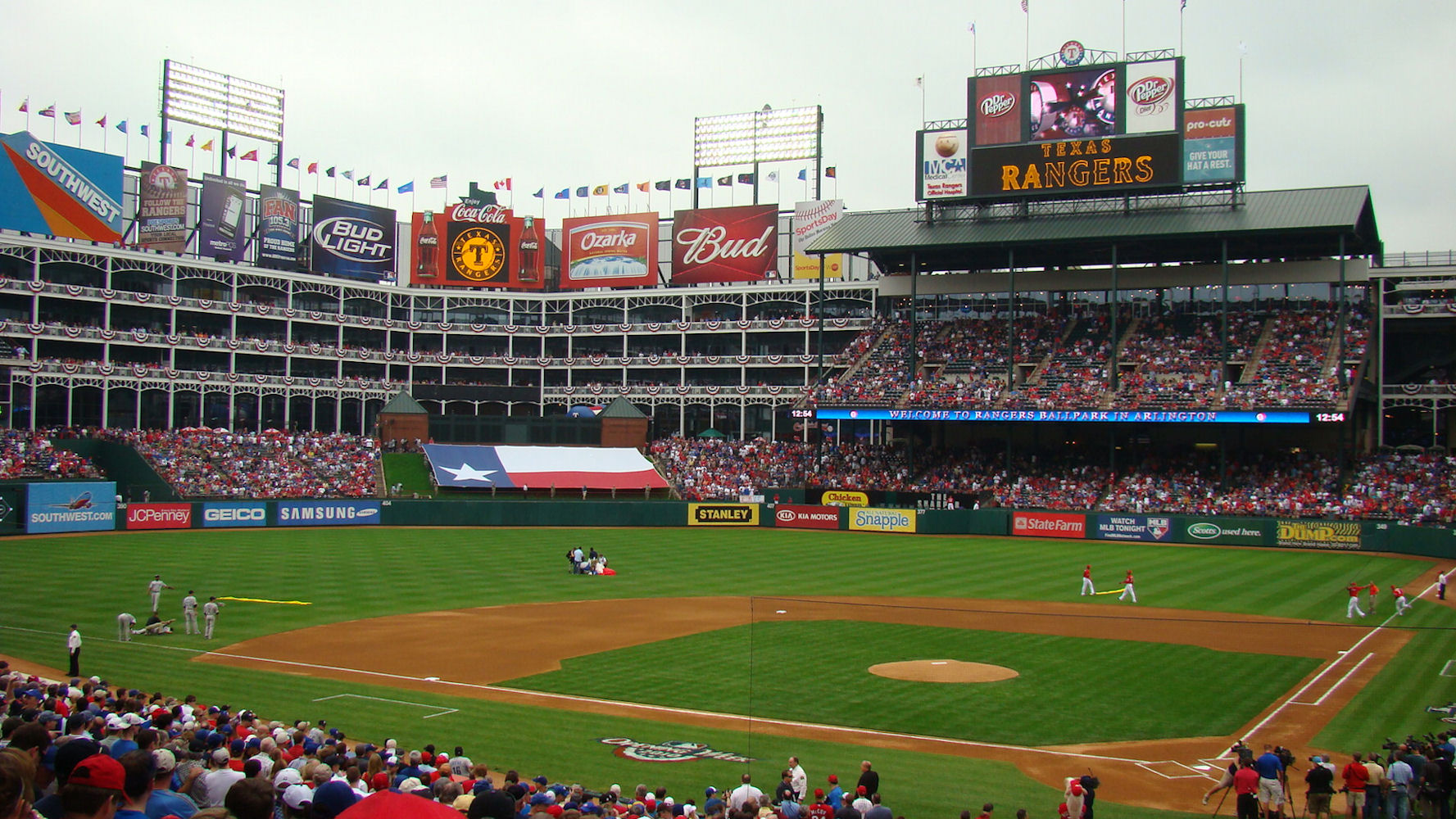
Texas Rangers in 2010

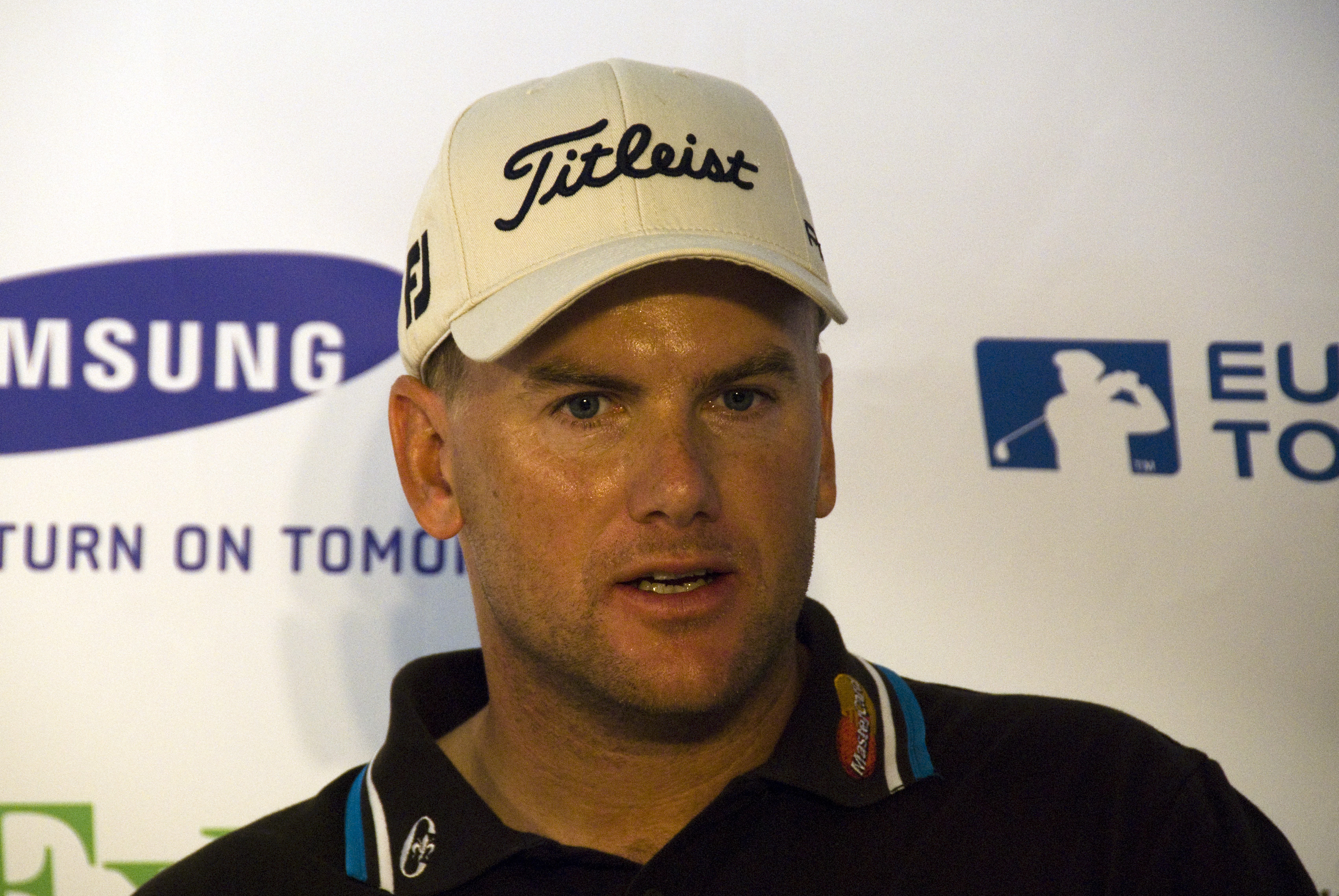
2010 Scandinavian Masters

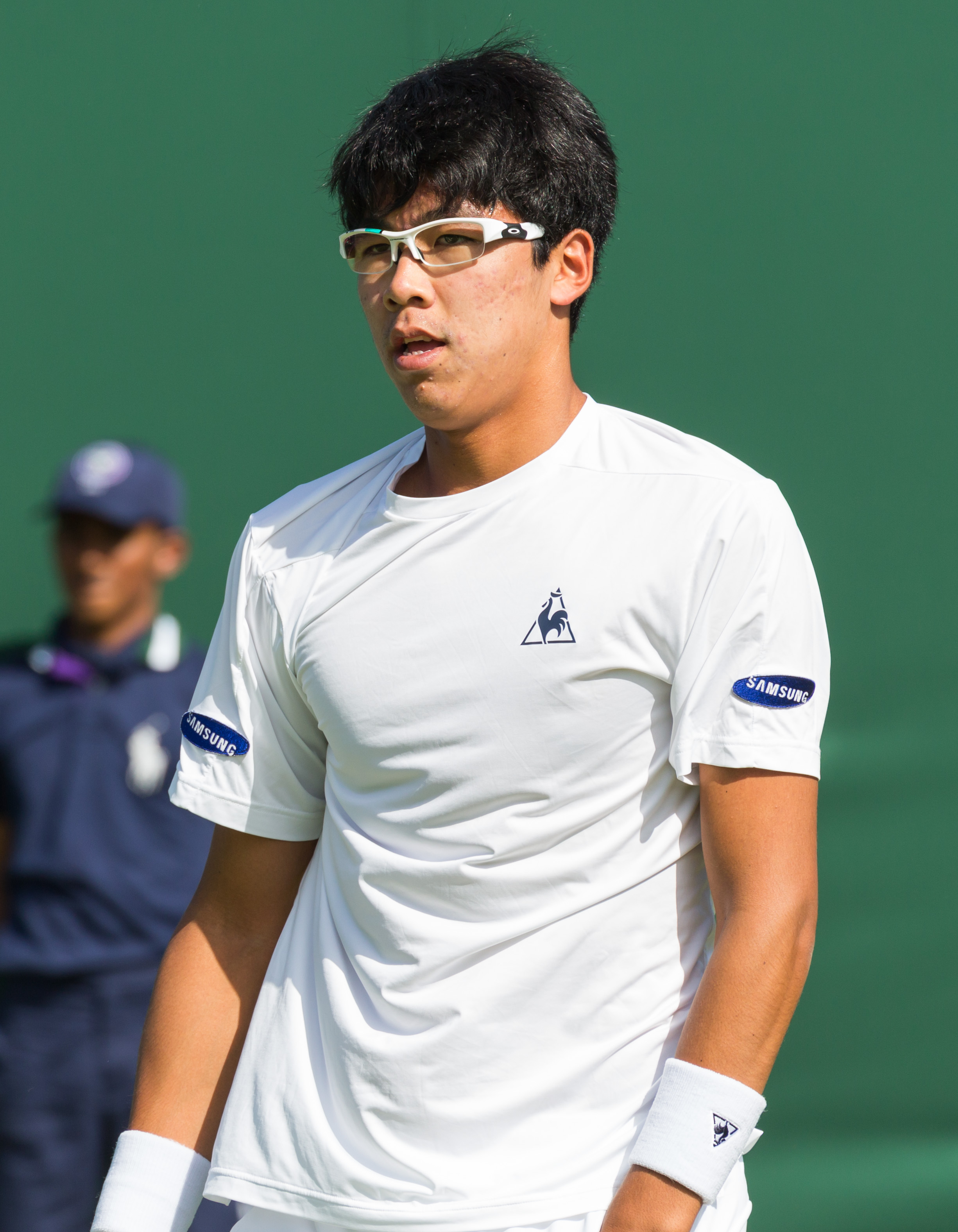
Chung Hyeon in 2015

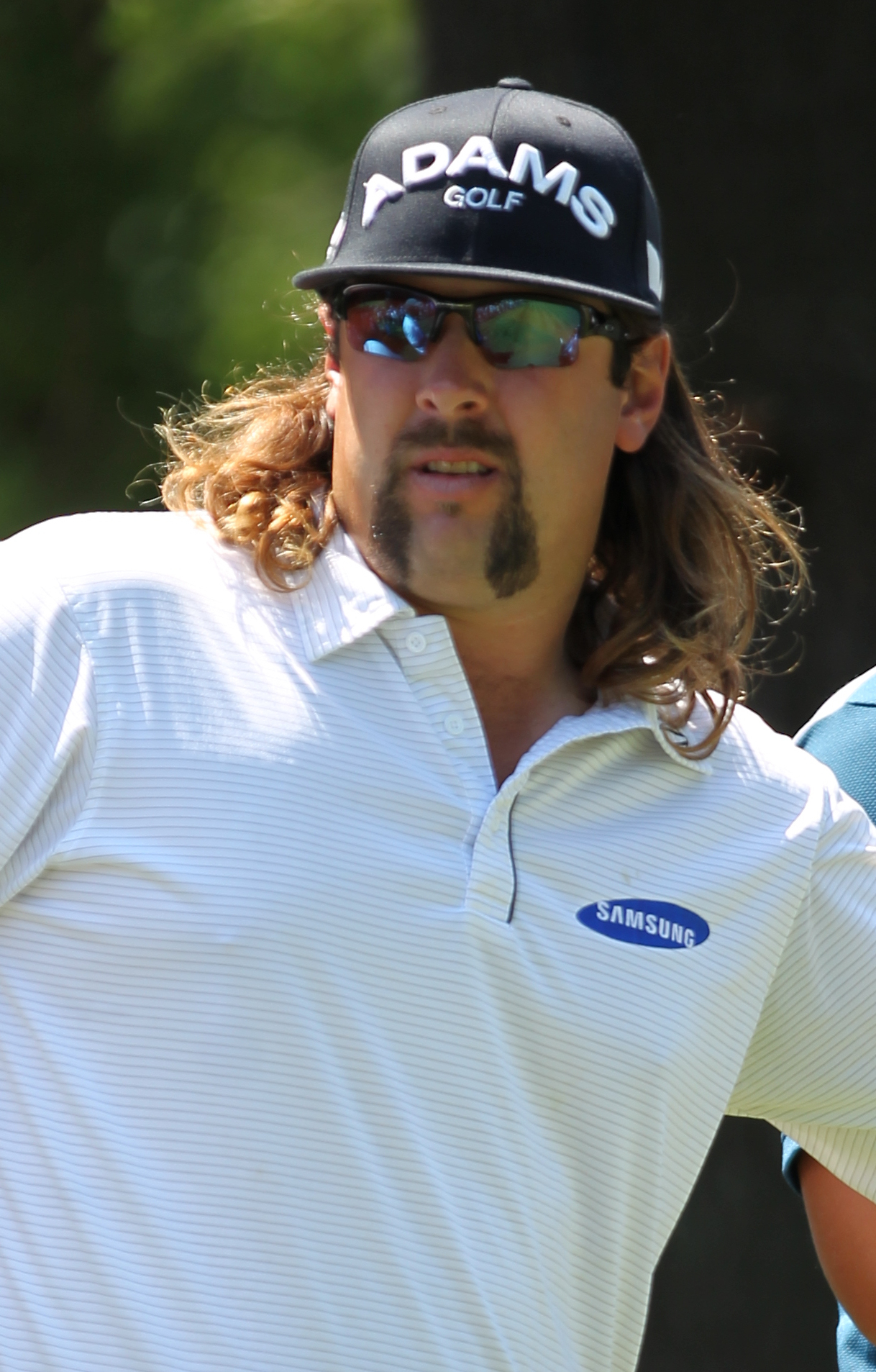
Andres Gonzales in 2011

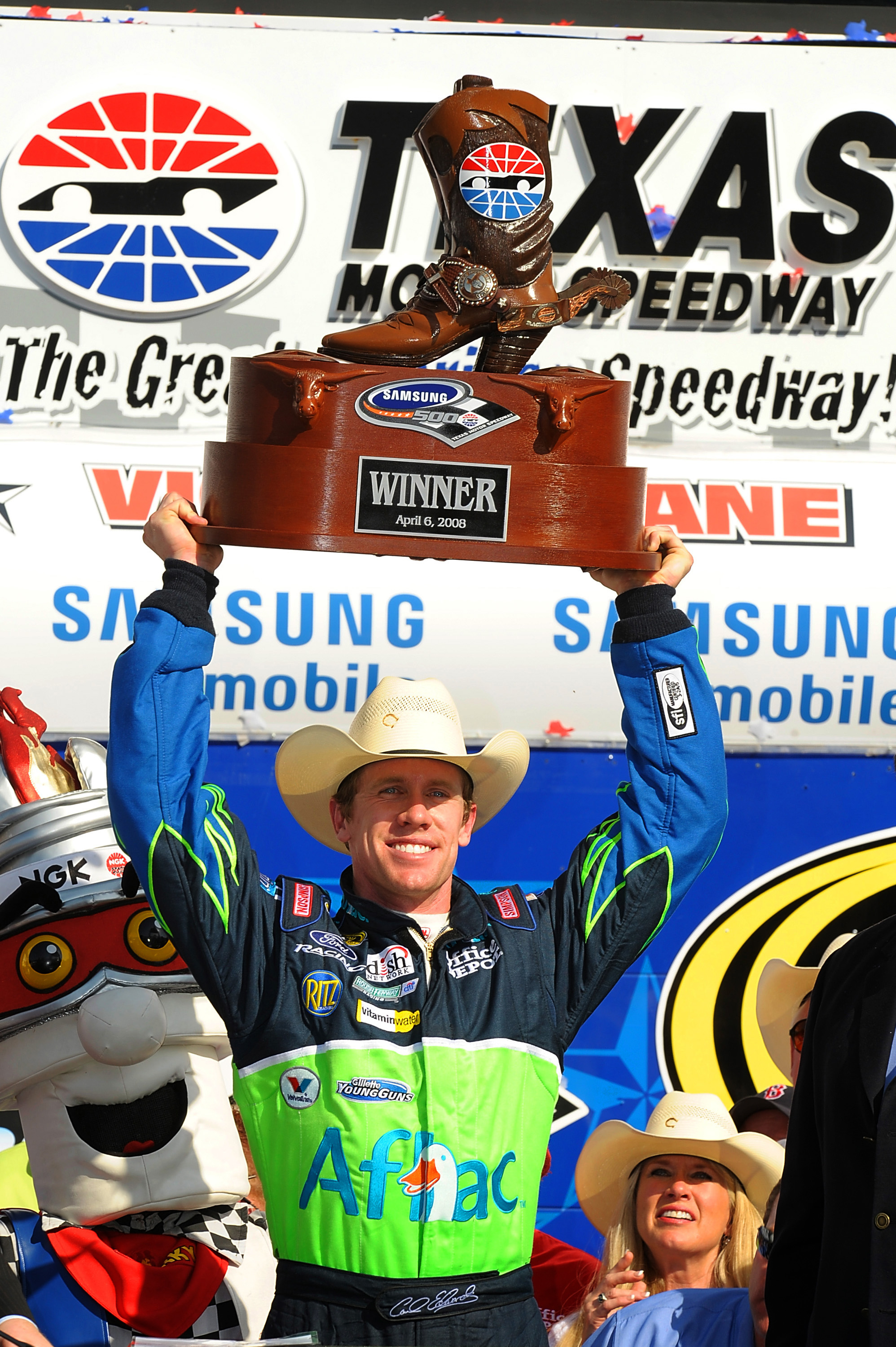
2008 Samsung 500 (NASCAR Sprint Cup Series)

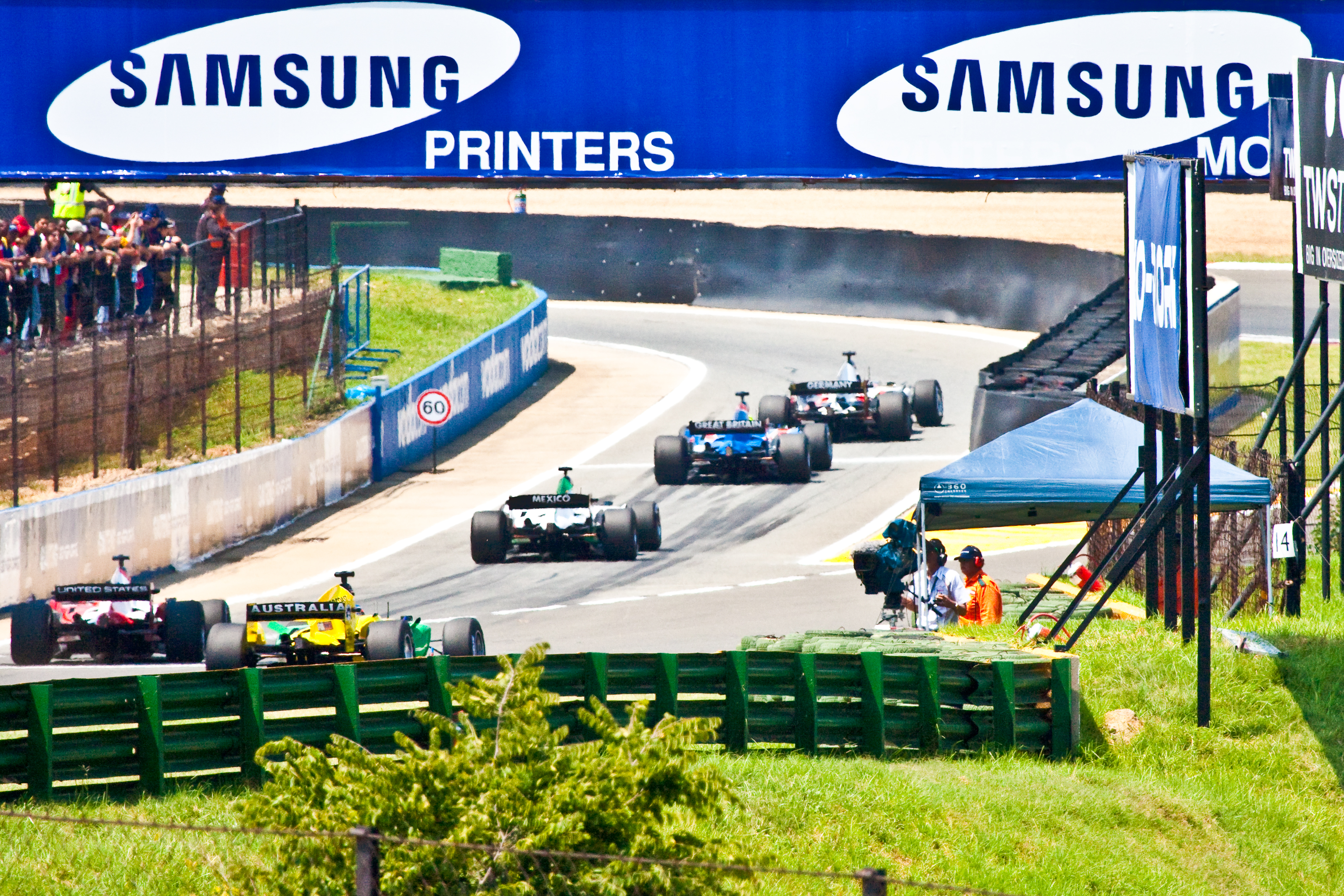
2008–09 A1 Grand Prix of Nations, South Africa

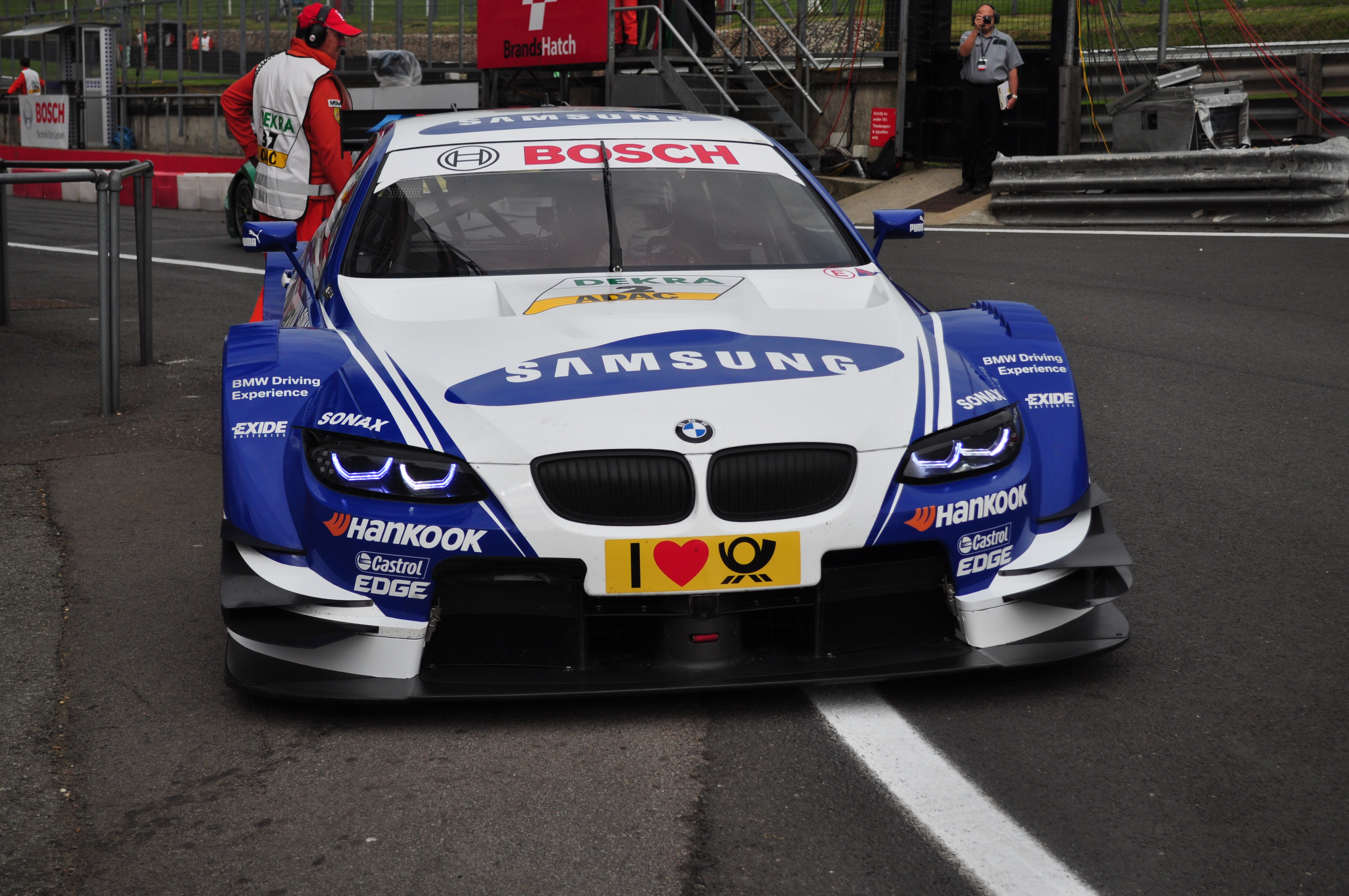
Team RMG in 2012

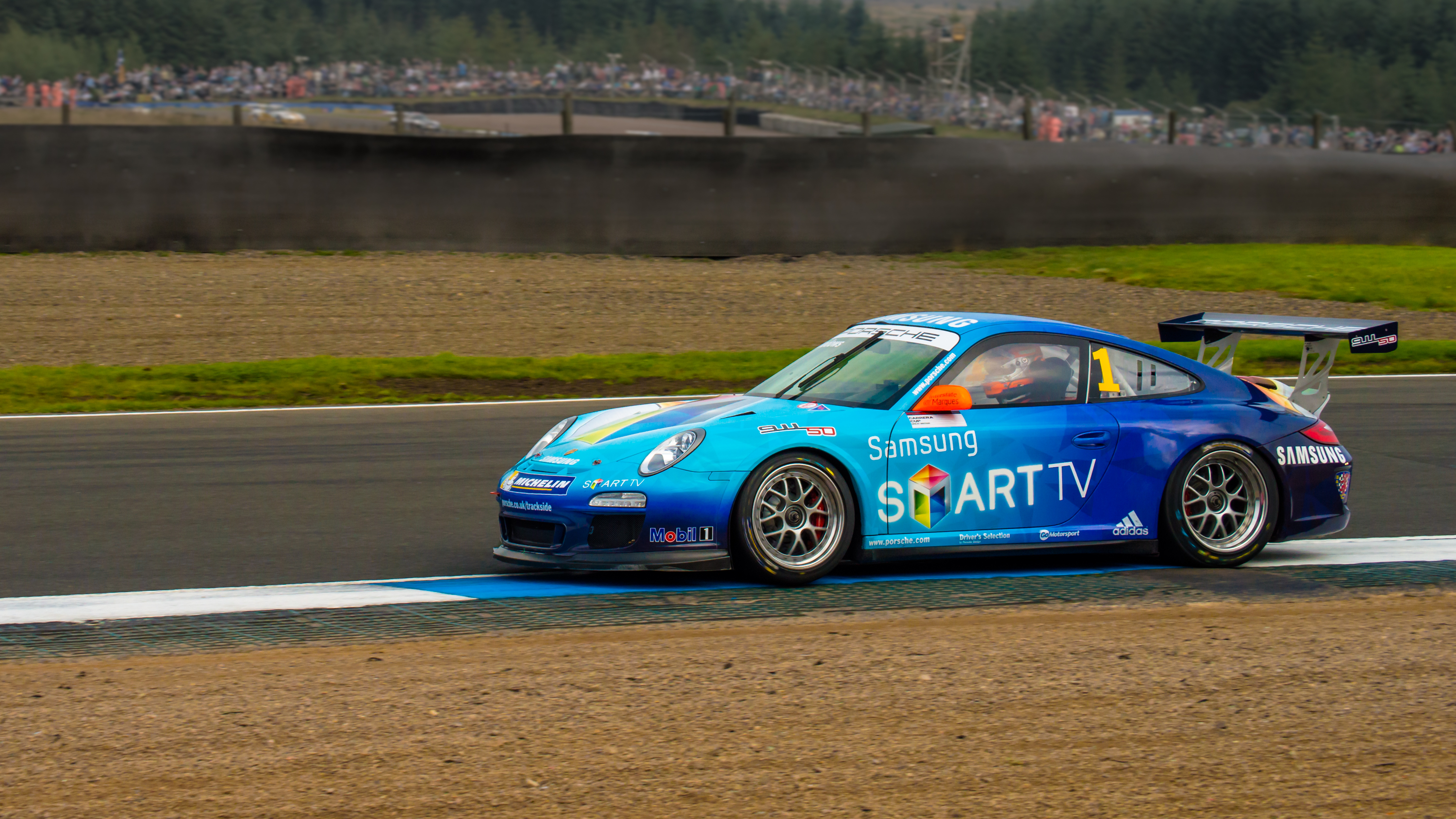
Samsung Smart Motorsport Porsche Carrera Cup team in 2013

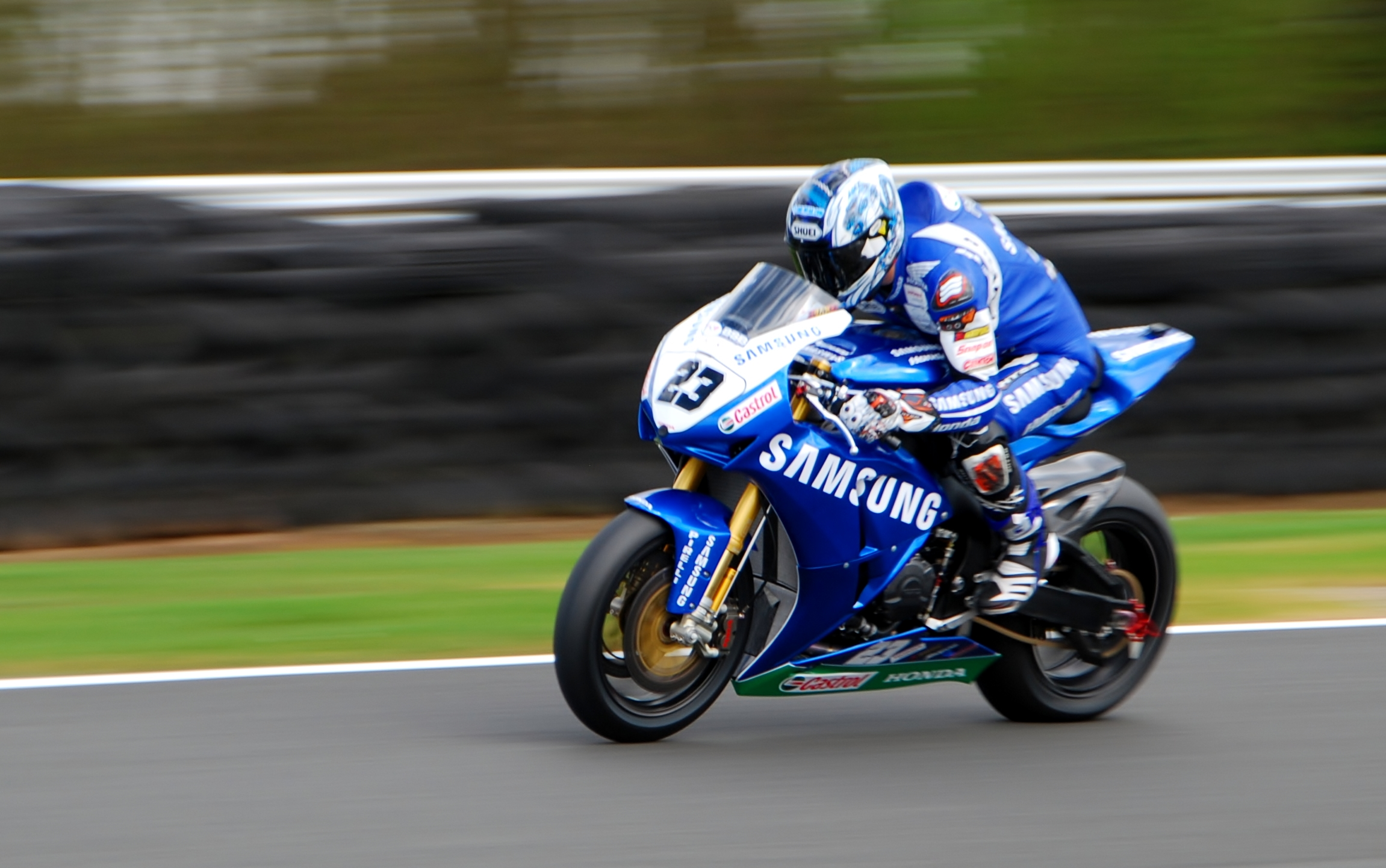
Honda Racing British Superbike team in 2013

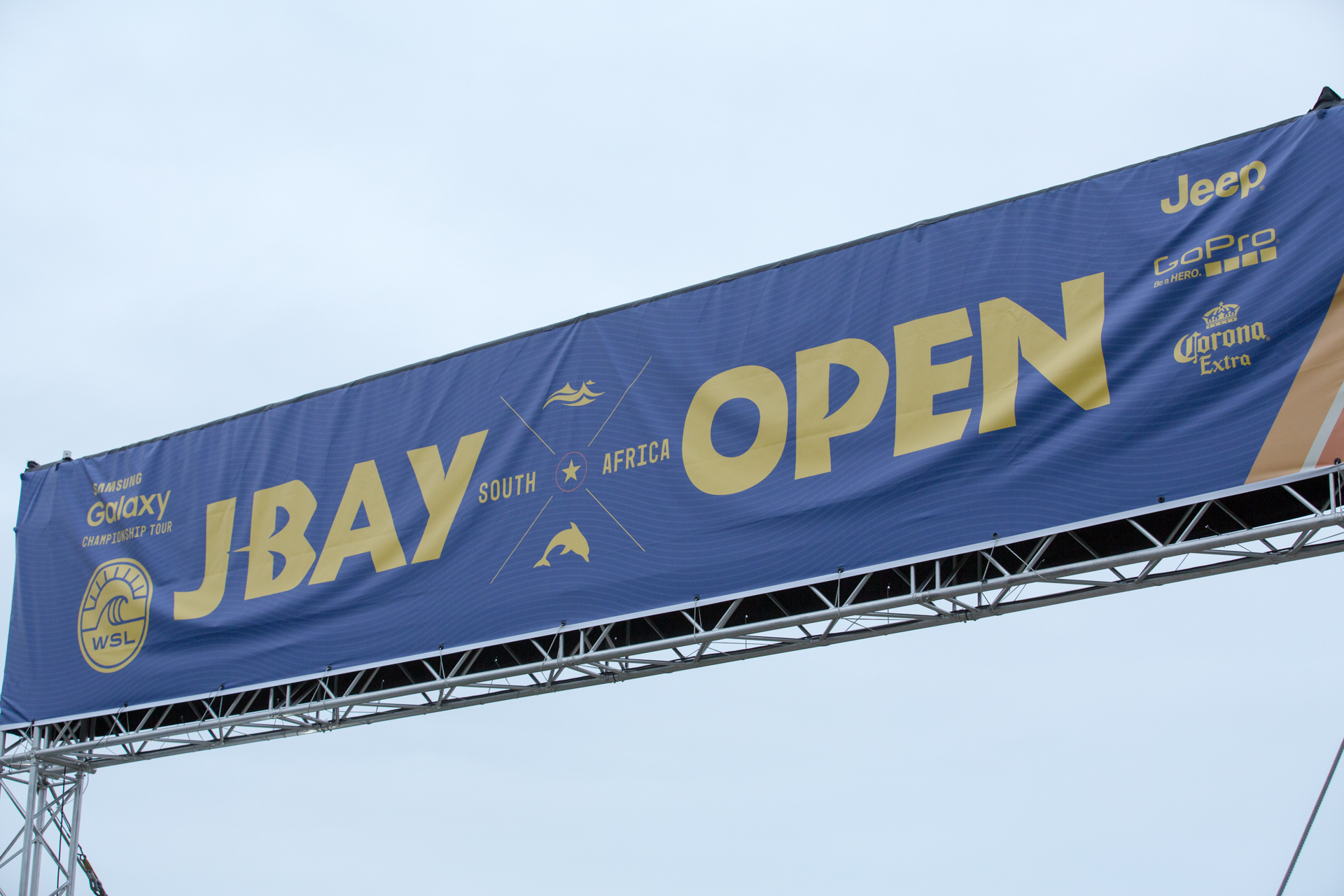
2015 J-Bay Open

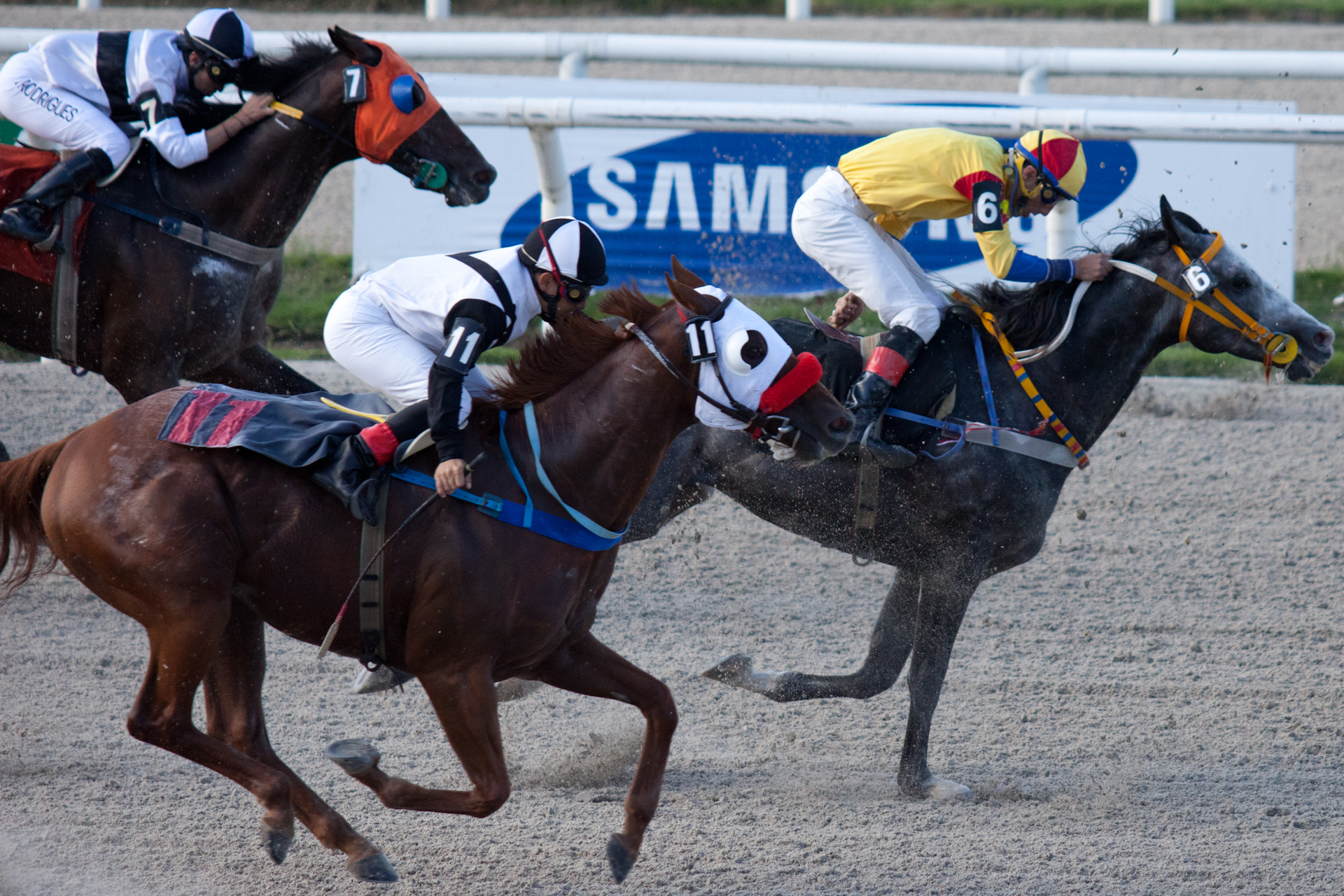
2013 Gran Premio José Pedro Ramírez

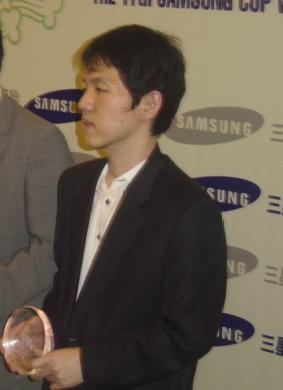
Samsung Fire Cup

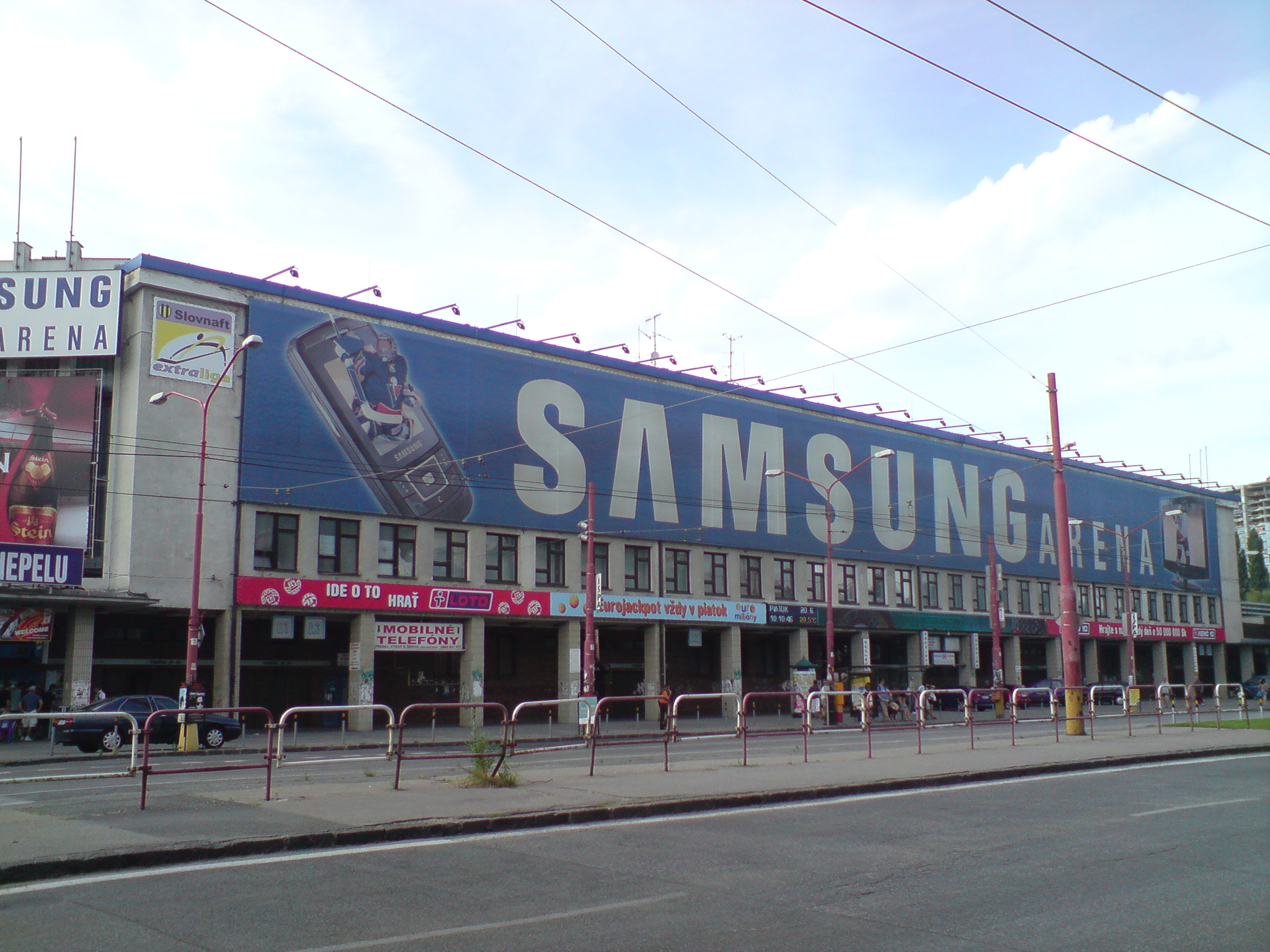
Ondrej Nepela Arena in 2008

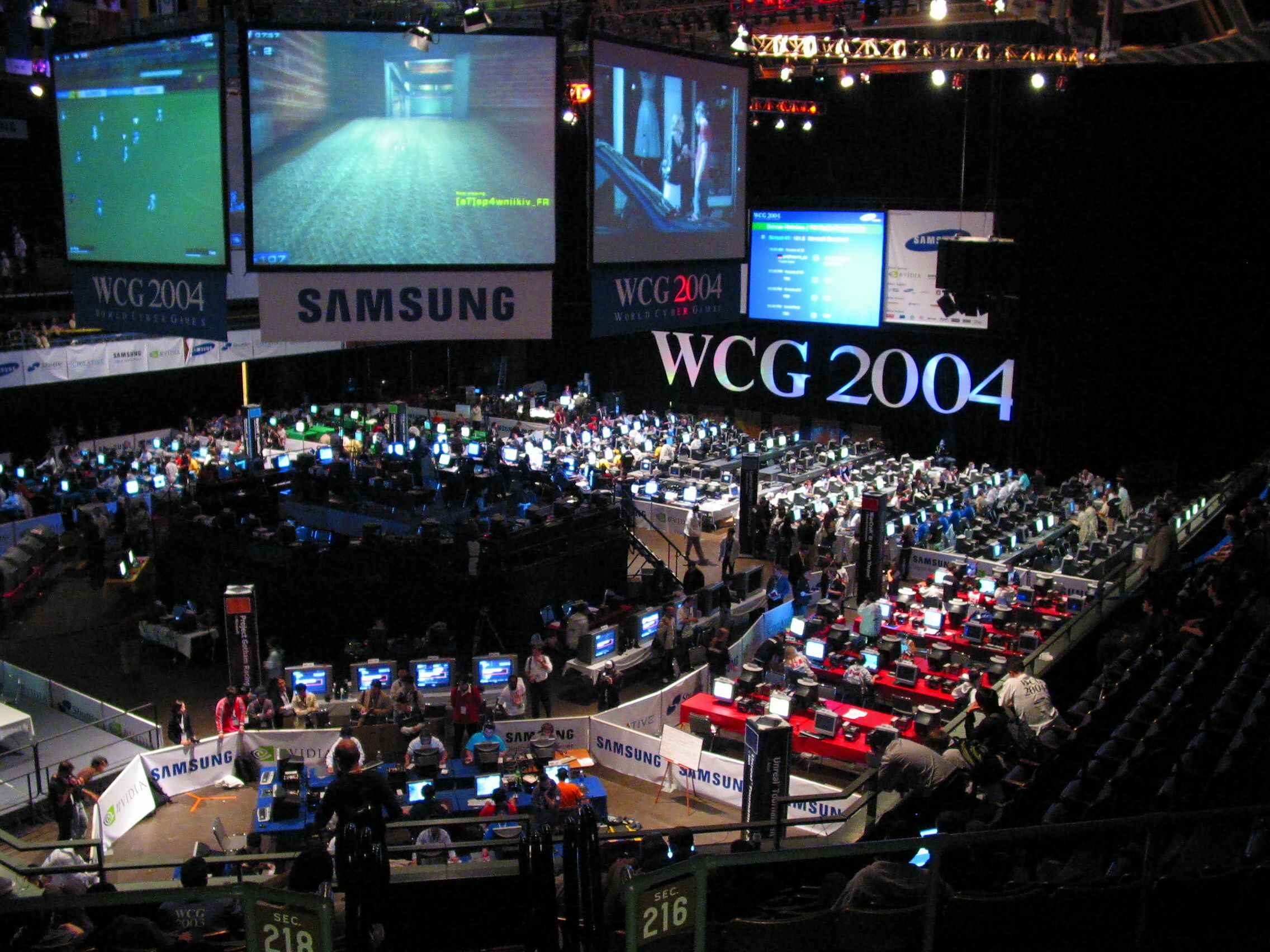
2004 World Cyber Games

=== Organization ===
- International Olympic Committee
- FINA
- Asian Football Confederation
- Confederation of African Football
- International Association of Athletics Federations
- International Hockey Federation
- Union Cycliste Internationale
- Korean Olympic Committee
- Korea Association of Athletics Federations
- Korea Skating Union
- Korea Women's Football Federation
- United States Olympic Committee
- British Olympic Association
- Italian National Olympic Committee
- Swedish Olympic Committee
- Belgian Olympic Committee
- National Olympic Committee of Ukraine
- Jordan Olympic Committee
- Sports Federation and Olympic Committee of Hong Kong, China
- Singapore National Olympic Council
- Australian Olympic Committee
- The Football Association
- Austrian Football Association
- USA Basketball
- Australian Rugby Union
- Rugby Football Union
- Hockey Canada

=== Competition ===
- Olympic Games
- Paralympic Games
- Universiade
- Youth Olympic Games
- IAAF World Championships in Athletics
- IAAF World Indoor Championships in Athletics
- IAAF Diamond League
- FINA World Aquatics Championships
- ISU Short Track Speed Skating World Cup
- UCI Track Cycling World Cup
- World Rowing Championships
- World Rowing Cup
- FIVB Volleyball Men's World Championship
- FIVB Volleyball World League
- Asian Games
- FIFA World Cup Asian Qualifiers
- AFC Asian Cup
- Africa Cup of Nations
- Copa Libertadores
- Austrian Cup
- Beach Soccer Intercontinental Cup
- FIBA EuroBasket
- FIBA 3x3 World Championships
- La Liga
- National Basketball Association
- NBA Summer League
- Major League Baseball
- Samsung Securities Cup
- PGA Championship
- Samsung World Championship
- Asian Amateur Championship
- The Samsung Marathon of Tel Aviv- Israel
- Davao Pro-am Golf Tournament
- NASCAR
- Test match (rugby league)
- Super Rugby
- KBO League Post Season
- Korea National League
- WK League
- Women's Korean Basketball League
- Chinese Super League
- Italian Women's Volleyball League
- Samsung Cup World Go Championship
- Copa Samsung
- University Athletic Association of the Philippines
- Subroto Cup
- Samsung MOTG Freestyle World Championship
- World Match Racing Tour
- World Combat Games
- ASP World Tour
- Triple Crown of Surfing
- Whistler Blackcomb
- World Cyber Games

=== Individual ===
- (Spain) Alexia Putellas
- (South Korea) Yuna Kim
- (South Korea) Kim Ja-in
- (South Korea) Chung Hyeon
- (England) David Beckham
- (Argentina) Lionel Messi
- (Brazil) Paulo Henrique Ganso
- (Brazil) Junior dos Santos
- (United States) LeBron James
- (Philippines) Manny Pacquiao
- (Dominican Republic) David Ortiz
- (Jamaica) Usain Bolt
- (Russia) Maria Sharapova
- (Serbia) Ana Ivanovic
- (China) Li Na
- (Australia) James Magnussen
- (Australia) Ahmed Kelly
- (Japan) Taku Hiraoka
- Team Samsung (2010 Winter Olympics, 2012 Summer Olympics and 2014 Asian Games)
  - (Canada) Team Samsung (2010 Vancouver): Wayne Gretzky, Jarome Iginla, Hayley Wickenheiser
  - (United Kingdom) Team Samsung (2012 London): Zara Phillips, Phillips Idowu, Victoria Pendleton, Laura Trott, Alex Partridge, Jenna Randall, Daniel Purvis, Emily Pidgeon, Keith Cook, Jon Pollock, Sally Brown / David Beckham (Honorary ambassador)
  - (Italy) Team Samsung (2012 London): Valentina Vezzali, Rossano Galtarossa, Sara Morganti, Silvia Salis, Clemente Russo, Luca Dotto, Stefano Tempesti, Aldo Montano, Tania Cagnotto, Elisa Santoni
  - Team Malaysia (2012 London): Fatehah Mustapa, Khairulnizam Afendy, Azizulhasni Awang, Lee Chong Wei, Pandelela Rinong, Nur Suryani Mohd Taibi, Cheng Chu Sian, Yu Peng Kean
  - (South Korea) Team Samsung (2014 Incheon): Park Tae-hwan, Kim Nam-hun, Kim Yong-woong, Kong Tae-hyun, Youm Eun-ho
  - (China) Team Samsung (2014 Incheon): Ma Long, Zhang Peimeng, Xu Anqi
  - (Thailand) Team Samsung (2014 Incheon): Pornchai Kaokaew, Wassana Winatho, Nootsara Tomkom, Chatchai Butdee
  - (Malaysia) Team Samsung (2014 Incheon): Lee Chong Wei, Pandelela Rinong
  - (India) Team Samsung (2014 Incheon): Parupalli Kashyap, P. V. Sindhu, Deepika Kumari, Gagan Narang, Manavjit Singh Sandhu, Malaika Goel, Abhinav Bindra, Babita Kumari, Yogeshwar Dutt, Vinesh Phogat, Mary Kom, Devendro Singh
  - (Jordan) Team Samsung (2014 Incheon): Laith Al-Bashtawi, Ihab Al-Matbouli, Reham Abu Ghazaleh, Yahya Abu Tabaikh, Dana Haidar
- Samsung GALAXY Team (2014 Winter Olympics, 2016 Summer Olympics and 2018 Winter Olympics)
  - Russia (2014 Sochi): Evgeni Malkin, Tatiana Borodulina, Elizaveta Tuktamysheva, Liudmila Privivkova, Serafim Pikalov, Evgeny Ustyugov, Sergey Shilov, Nikita Kriukov, Maxim Trankov and Tatiana Volosozhar / Maria Sharapova (Honorary ambassador)
  - Germany (2014 Sochi): Magdalena Neuner, Isabella Laböck, Severin Freund, Anna Schaffelhuber
  - United Kingdom (2014 Sochi): Eve Muirhead, James Woods, Billy Morgan, Elise Christie, Shelley Rudman, Kelly Gallagher, Charlotte Evans
  - Italy (2014 Sochi): Armin Zöggeler, Christof Innerhofer, Arianna Fontana, Omar Visintin, Melania Corradini
  - France (2014 Sochi): Alexis Pinturault, Tessa Worley, Vincent Gauthier-Manuel
  - Netherlands (2014 Sochi): Ireen Wüst, Bell Berghuis, Bibian Mentel
  - Austria (2014 Sochi): Hermann Maier, Benjamin Maier, Miriam Kastlunger, Wolfgang Linger, Andreas Linger, Christina Ager, Thomas Pöck, Gregor Schlierenzauer, Claudia Lösch, Anna Fenninger
  - Switzerland (2014 Sochi): Kai Mahler, Fabian Bösch, Giulia Tanno, Patrick Burgener, David Hablützel, Fanny Smith
  - Ukraine (2014 Sochi): Yosyf Penyak, Andriy Deryzemlya, Annamari Chundak
  - Poland (2014 Sochi): Piotr Żyła, Katarzyna Bachleda-Curuś, Andrzej Szczęsny
  - Sweden (2014 Sochi): Henrik Lundqvist, Anna Holmlund, Victor Öhling Norberg, Frida Hansdotter, Helene Ripa
  - Norway (2014 Sochi): Aksel Lund Svindal, Bastian Juell, Hedda Berntsen, Mariann Marthinsen, Ståle Sandbech
  - Finland (2014 Sochi): Petteri Nummelin, Jouni Pellinen, Andreas Romar, Katja Saarinen
  - United States (2014 Sochi): Evan Strong
  - Canada (2014 Sochi): Steven Stamkos, Hayley Wickenheiser, Greg Westlake, Marie-Ève Drolet, Michael Gilday
  - Australia (2014 Sochi): Alex Pullin, Scotty James, Jessica Gallagher
  - South Korea (2014 Sochi): Lee Sang-hwa, Lee Seung-hoon, Mo Tae-bum
  - China (2014 Sochi): Jia Zongyang, Xu Mengtao, Li Nina, Qi Guangpu
  - Italy (2016 Rio): Aldo Montano, Clemente Russo, Frank Chamizo Marquez, Tania Cagnotto, Erika Fasana, Marta Menegatti, Martina Caironi
  - Italy (2018 PyeongChang): Christof Innerhofer, Sofia Goggia, Dorothea Wierer, Omar Visintin
- GALAXY 11 (2014 FIFA World Cup)
  - Manager: (Germany) Franz Beckenbauer
  - Players: (Argentina) Lionel Messi (captain), (Germany) Mario Götze, (Brazil) Oscar, (China) Wu Lei, (Italy) Stephan El Shaarawy, (Nigeria) Victor Moses, (Colombia) Radamel Falcao, (South Korea) Lee Chung-yong, (Spain) Iker Casillas, (England) Wayne Rooney, (United States) Landon Donovan, (Russia) Aleksandr Kerzhakov, (Portugal) Cristiano Ronaldo
- Avengers: Age of Ultron: (Argentina) Lionel Messi (Iron Man), (United States) Eddie Lacy (Hulk), (United States) John John Florence (Thor), (Switzerland) Fabian Cancellara (Hawkeye), (Japan) Yoshihiro Akiyama ( (South Korea) Chu Seong-hoon)

=== Sports team ===
==== National team ====
- (South Korea) Team Korea
- (United States) Team USA
- (United Kingdom) Team GB
- Team Singapore
- (Italy) Italia Team
- (Sweden) Swedish Olympic Team
- (Belgium) Belgian Olympic Team
- (Australia) Australian Olympic Team
- Jordan Olympic Team
- Hong Kong Olympic Team
- Brazil national football team
- England national football team
- Austria national football team
- England national rugby union team
- Australia national rugby union team
- South Africa national rugby union team
- Canada national ice hockey team
- Canada national short track speed skating team
- China national ski team
- Jamaica national bobsleigh team

==== Club ====
- (Argentina) Club Atlético Vélez Sarsfield (Former)
- (Mexico) C.D. Guadalajara
- (Mexico) C.F. Pachuca
- (Spain) Real Madrid C.F.
- (Italy) Juventus FC
- (England) Chelsea (Former)
- (England) Wimbledon (Former)
- (Thailand) Royal Thai Police (Former)
- (Denmark) Brøndby IF (Former)
- (Greece) Olympiacos F.C.
- (Hungary) Vác FC (Former)
- (Republic of Ireland) Leinster Rugby
- (Northern Ireland) Banbridge RFC
- (Germany) Frankfurt Universe
- (Germany) BMW Motorsport
- (Germany) FC Köln (Former)
- (Germany) Eintracht Frankfurt (Former)
- (United Kingdom) Samsung Smart Motorsport
- (United Kingdom) Honda Racing British Superbike team
- (United States) Trek Factory Racing
- (Italy) Lampre-Merida
- (South Africa) MTN-Qhubeka
- (India) Mumbai Indians

== Facilities ==
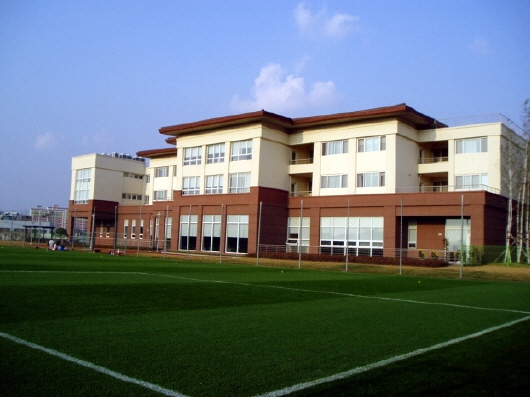
Suwon Samsung Bluewings Club House

- Samsung Training Center
- Samsung Leports Center
- Suwon Samsung Bluewings Club House - Suwon Samsung Bluewings
- Samsung Lions Ballpark - Samsung Lions
- Challenge Camp - Samsung Electronics Athletic Club
- Samsung Equestrian Center - Samsung Electronics Equestrian Team
- Hanullim Gymnasium - Samsung Electro-Mechanics Badminton Club

== Social contribution ==
- Keunnarae Program
- Dream Camp
- Therapeutic Riding
- I see your dreams
