= Samsung Training Center =

Sports venue in South Korea

- Location: Yongin, Gyeonggi; Republic of Korea
- Owner: Samsung
- Type: Sports facility

Construction
- Opened: 2007

Website
- Official Website

The Samsung Training Center (Korean: 삼성 트레이닝 센터) is training & rehabilitation center of Samsung Sports. It is located in Samsung Life Human Center, Yongin. It is lived for Seoul Samsung Thunders, Daejeon Samsung Bluefangs, Yongin Samsung Blueminx, Samsung Life Table Tennis Club, Samsung Life Wrestling Club, Samsung S1 Taekwondo Club. and It is used for all Samsung Sports teams. It has the area of 24,476.7 m^{2}.

== See also ==
- Samsung Sports
