= Samsung Heavy Industries Rugby Club =

1995–2015 South Korean rugby club

(South Korea) Samsung Heavy Industries
- Full name: Samsung Heavy Industries Rugby Club
- Union: Korea Rugby Union
- Founded: 1995
- Disbanded: 2015
- Region: Geoje
- Coach: Jung Sam-Young
1st kit	2nd kit

Official website
- www.samsungsports.net/Eng/rugby

Samsung Heavy Industries Rugby Club (Korean: 삼성중공업 럭비단) was a South Korean rugby football team in Samsung Heavy Industries.

== See also ==
- Samsung Heavy Industries
- Samsung Sports
