= Samsung Heavy Industries =

South Korean shipbuilding company

Samsung Heavy Industries Co., Ltd.
- Native name: 삼성중공업 (三星重工業)
- Type: Public
- Traded as: KRX: 010140
- Industry: Shipbuilding
- Founded: 5 August 1974; 52 years ago
- Headquarters: Samsung Town, Seoul, South Korea
- Key people: Jin-Taek Jung (president and CEO)
- Revenue: KRW 7.35 trillion (2019)
- Net income: KRW (1.32) trillion (2019)
- Total assets: KRW 13.61 trillion (2019)
- Total equity: KRW 5.25 trillion (2019)
- Owners: Samsung Electronics (15.98%); National Pension Service (7.07%); Other Samsung affiliates (5.28%)
- Number of employees: 11,897 (December 2016)
- Parent: Samsung
- Website: samsungshi.com/En/

Samsung Heavy Industries Co., Ltd. (SHI; Korean: 삼성중공업) is a South Korean shipbuilding company and part of the Samsung Group. It is one of the "Big Three" shipbuilders of South Korea, along with Hanwha and Hyundai. The company's primary activities include the engineering and construction of commercial vessels including container ships, LNG carriers, oil platforms, drill ships, and floating production storage and offloading (FPSO/FSO) units.

The company’s main shipyard is located in Geoje, South Korea, and includes three dry docks and five floating docks. SHI also operates ship block fabrication facilities in Ningbo and Rongcheng, China, as well as a design center in India.

== History ==
Samsung Heavy Industries was established in 1974, when the company's Changwon plant was opened. SHI soon purchased Woojin, followed by the construction of Geoje shipbuilding facilities and merger with Daesung Heavy Industries.

Samsung Shipbuilding and Daesung Heavy Industries were merged under Samsung Heavy Industries in 1983. Since then, it has put efforts in the introduction of new technologies and development of products, while expanding the business area into heavy equipment and construction.

Since the 21st century, SHI began to build LNG and large passenger ships in earnest, and exported shipbuilding technologies to the United States. Samsung Heavy Industries decided to advance into the cruise ship market, the last remaining stronghold of EU shipbuilders. The company stated entering the undertaking was necessary to maintain its number one position in the global shipbuilding market. In 2009, SHI was contracted to build a new residential cruise ship named Utopia, which will be the largest passenger ship ever assembled in Asia. The ship will test the waters by 2016.

=== Vehicle production ===
Starting in the late 1980s, SHI produced forklifts and heavy equipment (mainly excavators) at Changwon. The forklift production was established through agreements with Clark Material Handling Company (production started in 1986) and the heavy equipment production came from the construction equipment division of Korea's Heavy Industries and Construction, acquired by Samsung in 1983 (SHI began manufacturing heavy equipment in 1987). Truck production was added in May 1993. The company also assembled electric car prototypes. The truck production business was spun off in 1996 as a separate company called Samsung Commercial Vehicles. The forklift and heavy equipment businesses were sold off in 1998.

=== Wind turbine manufacture ===
Samsung Heavy Industries has been involved in wind turbine manufacture including the S7.0-171 turbine, which in 2013 was the world's largest wind turbine. It is still one of the most powerful turbines on Earth.

== See also ==
- Economy of South Korea
- List of Korean companies
- List of shipbuilders and shipyards
- Seocho Samsung Town
- Samsung Heavy Industries Rugby Club
