= League of Legends: Season 1 World Championship final =

2011 esports competition

League of Legends: Season 1 World Championship Final
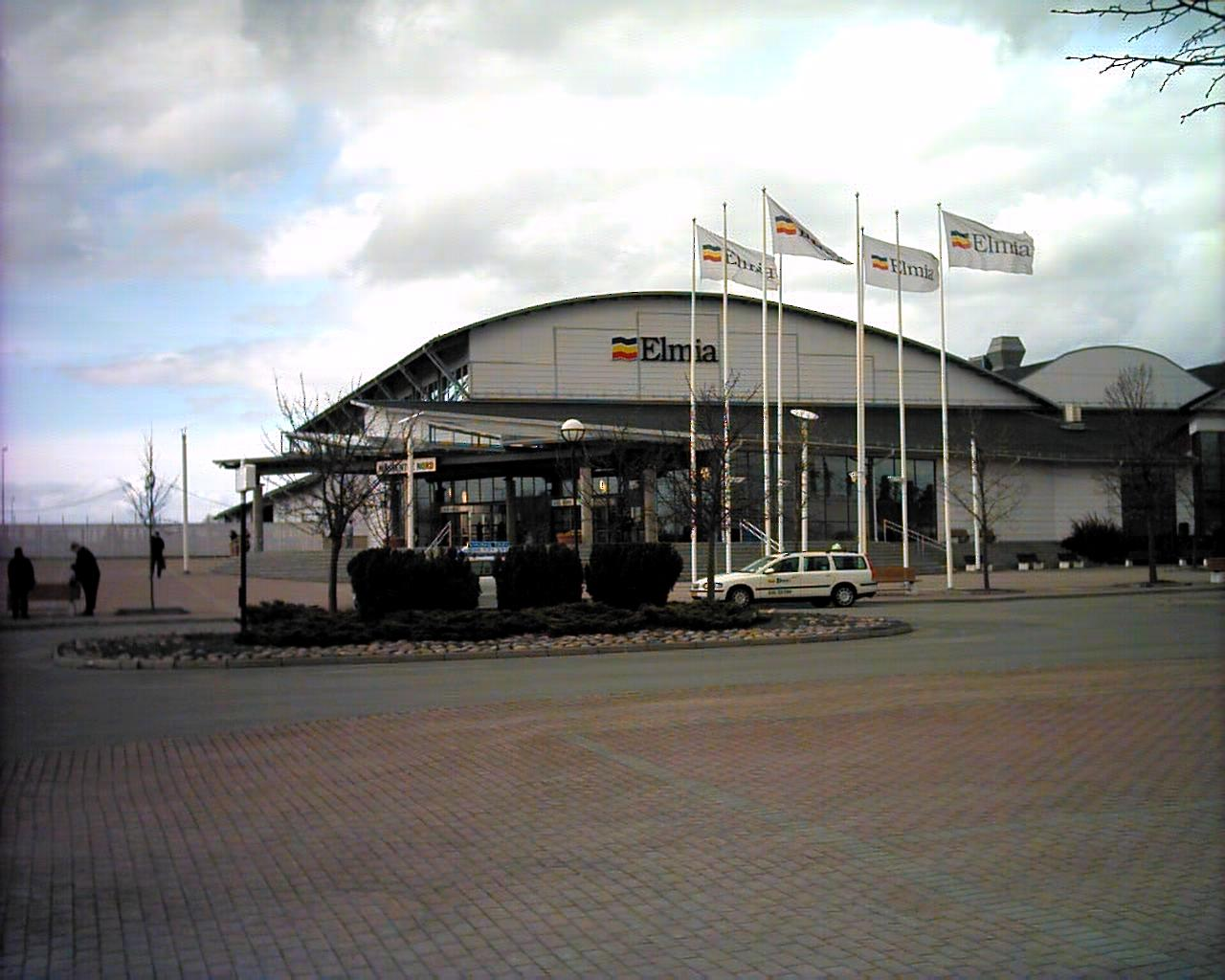
- The Elmia Exhibition and Convention Centre (pictured in 2006) hosted the inaugural final.
| FNC | aAa |
| 2 | 1 |
- Date: 20 June 2011
- Venue: Elmia Exhibition and Convention Centre, Jönköping
- MVP: Maciej "Shushei" Ratuszniak

Live Broadcast
- Announcers: Rivington "RivingtonThe3rd" Bisland III; David "Phreak" Turley
- Viewers: 210,069

The League of Legends: Season 1 World Championship Final was a League of Legends (LoL) esports series between Fnatic and Against All Authority on 20 June 2011 at the Elmia Exhibition and Convention Centre in Jönköping, Sweden, as part of the DreamHack event. It was the inaugural final of the League of Legends World Championship.

Both Fnatic and Against All Authority were two of three European representatives, with the other being Team Gamed!de. The series was a best-of-three and was a rematch of the tournament's upper bracket final, which Fnatic won and subsequently were rewarded with a 1–0 advantage heading into the final. The match ended in a 2–1 win by Fnatic despite losing the first game.

Fnatic's mid-laner Maciej "Shushei" Ratuszniak earned Most Valuable Player honors, becoming the first player to win the award. The series also marked the first World Championship won by a team from the European/EMEA region (now known as the League of Legends EMEA Championship or LEC) and remains the only world title won by a team outside of Asia.

This would also be the only World Championship final to be held as part of a wider event, as editions of the League of Legends World Championship since 2012 have been held independently.

== Background ==
League of Legends was released in 2009 and was the first game to be developed by Riot Games. In the year 2010, as the game grew its player base, ranked play and draft mode was introduced, which gave it a full competitive experience for players. Around the same period, esports tournaments for the game began with the 2010 World Cyber Games in Los Angeles, United States. With growing viewership, Riot Games decided to enter the competitive scene, eventually deciding to hold the first World Championship in 2011. Players brought their own computers, with the opportunity for networking while competing in front of a small audience.

=== Route to the final ===
Both Fnatic (FNC) and Against All Authority (aAa) qualified for the first World Championship through one of the four regional qualifiers. For the European qualifiers, which consisted of eight teams, only the top three advanced to the tournament. Both aAa and FNC, alongside Team Gamed!de, finished in the top three. Other qualifier events occurred in North America, Singapore, and the Philippines.

In the group stage, which consisted of best-of-one matches, both Fnatic and Against All Authority were in the same group. aAa finished with a 2–1 win-loss slate, with their only loss coming against Epik Gamer of North America. Meanwhile, Fnatic finished with a 1–2 record, with their only win being against Pacific Esports of the Philippines. By virtue of finishing second in the group, Against All Authority earned a bye in the second round of the playoffs, while Fnatic began in the first round for finishing third.

Both teams won their initial matches: FNC beat Counter Logic Gaming in the first round and secured a 2–0 sweep against Epik Gamer in the following series; aAa beat Team SoloMid (TSM) in the second round. The two teams faced each other in the upper bracket final, with the winner securing a 1–0 advantage in the Finals. Fnatic would win with a 2–0 scoreline, with aAa defeating TSM in the lower bracket final to set up a rematch against FNC in the Finals.

== Rosters ==
| Role | FNC | aAa |
|---|---|---|
| Top-Lane | Enrique "xPeke" Cedeño Martínez | Paul "sOAZ" Boyer |
| Jungle | Lauri "Cyanide" Happonen | Damien "Linak" Lorthios |
| Mid-Lane | Maciej "Shushei" Ratuszniak | Maik "MoMa" Wallus |
| Bottom-Lane | Manuel "LaMiaZit" Mildenberger | Bora "YellOwStaR" Kim |
| Support | Peter "Mellisan" Meisrimel | Jérôme "Kujaa" Negretti |

== Summary ==
Unlike the normal two banning phases, there was only one banning phase where each team banned three champions each. Each team picked five champions per game.

=== Game 1 ===
FNC

Bans: Nunu, Warwick, Amumu
Picks: Malzahar, Rammus, Brand, Corki, Janna

aAa

Bans: Gragas, Alistar, Rumble
Picks: Irelia, Jarvan IV, Anivia, Ashe, Sona

Game

Against All Authority had an early advantage and secured the game's first dragon, but Fnatic would kill three members of aAa. However, FNC did not decide to go for Baron Nashor, which would've evened the game state, lead to aAa taking advantage with the Irelia and Anivia champions to win the first game of the series. Game 1 ended with a game time of 40 minutes and 59 seconds, and a kill scoreline of 20–7 in favor of Against All Authority, tying the series at one game apiece as Fnatic were given a 1–0 advantage as a result of their victory in the upper bracket final.

=== Game 2 ===
FNC

Bans: Rumble, Nunu, Amumu
Picks: Karthus, Warwick, Brand, Ashe, Sona

aAa

Bans: Alistar, Gragas, Anivia
Picks: Irelia, Jarvan IV, Malzahar, Corki, Janna

Game

Fnatic got the first kill of the game through the Brand, but Against All Authority continued to be in control of both top and bottom lanes and securing dragon. Despite this state, the Karthus would score three kills. Although Fnatic had a lead in gold, team fights continued to be close, with both teams contesting Baron Nashor multiple times. Late in the game, FNC managed to break into aAa's base, but the latter would go for one more Baron attempt. However, with three players down from aAa, Fnatic took advantage and pushed through the mid-lane to destroy the nexus. Game 2 ended with a game time of 43 minutes and 59 seconds, and a kill scoreline of 24–12 in favor of Fnatic, winning the inaugural League of Legends World Championship.

== Post-series and aftermath ==
The inaugural World Championship had a prize pool of US$100 thousand. Of this, the winners, Fnatic, received 50% ($50,000). For coming second, Against All Authority was rewarded 25% ($25,000), and Team SoloMid received 10% ($10,000) for finishing third. Fnatic remains the only team outside of Asia to win the tournament, as subsequent editions of the World Championship have been won by teams from Taiwan (then-Garena Premier League; now League of Legends Championship Pacific (LCP)), South Korea (League of Legends Champions Korea (LCK)), and China (League of Legends Pro League (LPL)). Two years after the 2011 final, the European League Championship Series (EU LCS), now known as the League of Legends EMEA Championship (LEC) was established.

Seven years later, European teams would qualify for two consecutive World Championship finals. Fnatic returned to the final during the 2018 edition, led by mid-laner Rasmus "Caps" Winther and bot-laner Carl Martin Erik "Rekkles" Larsson. In the 2019 edition held in Europe, G2 Esports, which also featured Caps and Luka "Perkz" Perković, became the third European team after Fnatic and Against All Authority to make the finals. Both instances, however, were losses to LPL representatives Invictus Gaming and FunPlus Phoenix, respectively.

2011 Finals MVP Maciej "Shushei" Ratuszniak passed away on 28 April 2025 after a battle with cancer, which was announced by Fnatic the day after. He was given a tribute in the music video of "Sacrifice", the official song of the 2025 League of Legends World Championship, which depicts Ratuszniak lifting the Summoner's Cup, the tournament's trophy which did not exist in 2011.
