= Happonen =

Happonen is a Finnish-language surname. Notable people with the surname include:

- Janne Happonen (born 1984), Finnish ski jumper
- Lauri Happonen (born 1994), Finnish esports player
- Onni Happonen (1898–1930), Finnish politician and murder victim
