= Cyanide (gamer) =

Finnish League of Legends player (1994–2026)

- Happonen in 2012

Personal information
- Name: Lauri Happonen
- Born: 1994 or 1995
- Died: 31 July 2026 (aged 31)

Career information
- Game: League of Legends
- Playing career: 2011–2017
- Role: Jungler

Team history
- 2011: oSk Gaming
- 2011: myRevenge
- 2011–2014: Fnatic
- 2015–2017: Origen

Career highlights and awards
- World champion (2011); 3× EU LCS champion

Lauri Johannes Happonen (1994 or 1995 – 31 July 2026) better known as Cyanide, was a Finnish professional League of Legends player who competed as a jungler. As a member of Fnatic, he won the Season 1 World Championship in 2011 at the age of 16, and remains the youngest-ever player to win the World Championship.

== Career ==
=== Season 1 ===
Becoming known in the high level ladders during Season 1, Cyanide found himself playing in the jungler role for oSk Gaming and started playing with now long time teammate, xPeke. In February 2011, the line up was picked up by myRevenge (myR). The team placed first at IEM Season V - Hanover Invitational; but two months after acquisition, Cyanide and the rest of the line up left myR to join Fnatic. The newly formed team gained quick recognition as being a top team in Europe and solidified a place as one of the world's best by competing and winning Riot Season 1 Championship in June 2011. The team then closed out Season 1 placing 3rd at IEM Season VI - Global Challenge Cologne, losing to North American Team SoloMid.

=== Pre-Season 2 ===
With his team, Cyanide went stateside to New York to play in IEM Season VI - Global Challenge New York, winning in a dominating fashion, not losing one game as they placed first, winning 2–0 over SK Gaming.

=== Season 2 ===
Cyanide had grown to be a top known jungler in the world for him and his team's increasing performances in tournaments. In Season 2, Fnatic had always placed in the top 3 in majority of participated events such as SK Trophy March and IGN ProLeague Elites. In August 2012, the Season 2 Regional Finals was held in Cologne where the top 3 placing teams would be flown to Los Angeles for the Season 2 World Championship for a chance to play $1,000,000 grand prize. Fnatic were unable to qualify in the top 3, getting 4th in the tournament, losing to Moscow Five and CLG Europe.

=== Pre-Season 3 ===
After the tough loss at regionals, Cyanide and team were able to bounce back strong in preparation for Season 3, winning major tournament DreamHack Winter 2012, and placing 2nd against the world's best at IPL Season 5 Las Vegas. At IEM Season VII - Global Challenge Cologne, the team went undefeated in their group and bested the Korean lineup consisting of players that took 2nd at the Season 2 Championship, CJ Entus. However, they were unable to beat other Korean team, SK Telecom T1, in the finals, placing 2nd in the tournament. The team went on to next play in IEM Season VII - Global Challenge Katowice, making it out of group stage but losing in the semi-finals to Azubu Frost.

In January 2013, his team had a chance to participate in Riot's new competitive league for upcoming Season 3 for NA and EU, the Riot Season 3 League Championship Series, but had to play for a spot at the Season 3 Europe Offline Qualifier. Fighting out of the group stage and into the quarterfinals, Cyanide and his crew were able to best MeetYourMakers in a 2-0 set to win a spot in the league and the chance to be part of an successful project in League of Legends.

=== Season 3 ===
With the North American and European community excited for the events of LCS, Season 3 began with Riot's new league of a 10-week series with the continent's best teams playing against eachother. Fnatic became the most consistent team throughout the series, with solid jungle play and pressure from Cyanide. The team ended the 10 weeks on top with a record of 22–6. Cyanide and his teammates had automatically reclaimed their spot in the league for the summer split when going into the Season 3 EU Spring Playoffs. Being a favorite in the playoffs, the team showed their strong playstyle, winning 2-1 vs Evil Geniuses, placing themselves in the finals against other team favorite, Gambit Gaming. In a close set of games, Cyanide with the rest of Fnatic were able to best the Russians, winning 3-2 and the $50,000 1st prize.

Cyanide qualified to the Season 3 World Championship with his team Fnatic, finishing 1st in the Summer Playoffs.

=== Season 4 ===
Cyanide and xPeke left Fnatic on 5 December 2014.

=== Season 5 ===
Cyanide joined Origen in May 2015 as a substitute jungler. He was present with the team at the Season 5 World Championship where Origen reached the semi-finals.

=== Season 7 ===
Cyanide retired from professional League of Legends play in May 2017.

== Tournament results ==
=== Fnatic ===
- 1st: Season 1 World Championship
- 3rd–4th: Season 3 World Championship
- 12th–13th: 2014 League of Legends World Championship

=== Origen ===
- 3rd–4th: 2015 League of Legends World Championship

== Death ==
On 31 July 2026, Happonen died at the age of 31. His death was officially announced on 26 October 2026, and no cause of death was given.
