= Shushei =

Polish League of Legends player (1989–2025)

Personal information
- Name: Maciej Ratuszniak
- Born: 16 March 1989
- Died: 28 April 2025 (aged 36)

Career information
- Game: League of Legends
- Playing career: 2011–2017
- Role: Mid laner

Team history
- 2011: myRevenge
- 2011–2012: Fnatic
- 2012: EloHell
- 2012: IWantCookie
- 2012–2013: DragonBorns
- 2013: Pulse Esports
- 2017: ESC PRO

Career highlights and awards
- World champion (2011) (MVP)

Maciej Ratuszniak (16 March 1989 – 28 April 2025), better known as Shushei, was a Polish professional League of Legends player who competed as a mid laner. As a member of Fnatic, he won the inaugural Season 1 World Championship in 2011 and was named the tournament's most valuable player (MVP).

He retired from esports in 2017 and died in 2025 at the age of 36 after a battle with cancer.
