= Team Malaysia =

Team Malaysia was a Dota 2 eSports team based in Kuala Lumpur, Malaysia.

Team Malaysia may also refer to any of a number of sports team representing Malaysia in international competition:

== National teams ==
Association football

- Malaysia national football team
- Malaysia women's national football team

Badminton

- Malaysia national badminton team

Baseball

- Malaysia national baseball team

Basketball

- Malaysia national basketball team
- Malaysia women's national basketball team

Beach soccer

- Malaysia national beach soccer team

Cricket

- Malaysia national cricket team
- Malaysia women's national cricket team

Field hockey

- Malaysia men's national field hockey team
- Malaysia women's national field hockey team

Futsal

- Malaysia national futsal team

Ice hockey

- Malaysia men's national ice hockey team
- Malaysia women's national ice hockey team

Kabaddi

- Malaysia national kabaddi team

Netball

- Malaysia national netball team

Rugby union

- Malaysia national rugby union team
- Malaysia women's national rugby union team
- Malaysia national rugby sevens team (Sevens)
- Malaysia women's national rugby sevens team (Sevens)

Squash

- Malaysia men's national squash team
- Malaysia women's national squash team

Tennis

- Malaysia Davis Cup team
- Malaysia Fed Cup team

Volleyball

- Malaysia women's national volleyball team
