= Nora-Rengo =

Japanese esports organization

Nora-Rengo 野良連合
- Nickname: Noraren
- Short name: nR
- Sport: Call of Duty; For Honor; Overwatch; PlayerUnknown's Battlegrounds; Rainbow Six: Siege; Splatoon 2
- Founded: 2016; 10 years ago
- Location: Japan
- Colors: Maroon, White, Blue
- Manager: Yasuhiro "Kizoku" Nishi
- Partners: XSplit; G-SQUARE; OPENREC.tv; OCA Osaka School of Design & IT; ZETTA meel; OMEN
- Website: www.norarengou.com

Nora-Rengo (Japanese: 野良連合, Hepburn: Nora Rengō; transl. "Nora Union") is a Japanese esports organization with teams competing in Call of Duty, For Honor, Overwatch, PlayerUnknown's Battlegrounds, Rainbow Six: Siege and Splatoon 2. The organization was originally created in 2016 to compete in the PS4 version of Rainbow Six: Siege. The founder and owner is Yasuhiro "Kizoku" Nishi who also coaches the Rainbow Six Siege team.

== Rainbow Six: Siege ==
On 17 November 2018, Nora Rengo defeated Rogue and advanced to the semifinals of the Rainbow Six Siege Pro League Season 8, becoming the first APAC team to advance to a semifinals match. They were later joined by Australian Fnatic who defeated top North Americans, Evil Geniuses.

=== Roster ===
Nat.	ID	Name	Role	Join date
(Japan)	Merieux	Tsukasa Asano	Player	2017-10-26
(Japan)	Papilia	Toya Miyazawa	Player	2018-09-05
(Japan)	Yoshinngo	Yoshifumi Yukimori	Player	2019-04-23
(Japan)	SouLboi	Atsushi Yano	Player	2020-02-13
(Japan)	Simotuki	Tomohisa Imoto	Player	2020-05-24
(Japan)	Kizoku	Yasuhiro Nishi	Coach	Founder
(Brazil)	Ar7hur	Arthur Schubert	Coach	2020-01-30
(Japan)	Jinku	Hitoshi Okada	Analyst	2018-10-31
(Japan)	redenergy	Toru Tsuji	Manager	2018-??-??
(Japan)	Wokka	Yudai Ichise	Streamer	2017-08-06

=== Tournament results ===
Tournament	End date	Location	Placement	Prize
Pro League Year 2 Season 3 Japan	2017-10-03	Japan	1st	APAC Finals
Pro League Year 2 Season 3 APAC Finals	2017-10-21	Sydney, Australia	5-8th	$0
Pro League Season 7 Japan	2018-04-04	Japan	1st	APAC Finals
Pro League Season 7 APAC Finals	2018-04-15	Sydney, Australia	2nd	Finals
Pro League Season 7 Finals	2018-05-19	Atlantic City, New Jersey	5-8th	$8,000
Six Major Paris 2018	2018-08-15	Paris, France	9-12th	$7,500
Pro League Season 8 Japan	2018-09-26	Japan	2nd	APAC Finals
Pro League Season 8 APAC Finals	2018-10-14	Tokyo, Japan	1st	Finals
Six Masters 2018	2018-10-27	Melbourne, Australia	2nd	$4,255
Pro League Season 8 Finals	2018-11-18	Rio de Janeiro, Brazil	3-4th	$15,000
AOC OPEN 2018	2018-11-23	Tokyo, Japan	2nd	$1,327
Six Invitational 2019	2019-02-16	Montreal, Quebec, Canada	3-4th	$160,000
Pro League Season 9 Japan	2019-03-27	Japan	1st	APAC Finals
Pro League Season 9 APAC Finals	2019-04-14	Sydney, Australia	2nd	Finals
Pro League Season 9 Finals	2019-05-18	Milan, Italy	5-8th	$20,000
Six Major Raleigh 2019	2019-08-18	Raleigh, North Carolina, USA	13-16th	$5,000
Pro League Season 10 Japan	2019-09-26	Japan	2nd	APAC Finals
Pro League Season 10 APAC Finals	2019-10-18	Sydney, Australia	5-8th	$0
Pro League Season 11 Japan	2020-03-26	Japan	3rd	$2,500
