= Ellen Åkesson =

Swedish powerlifter

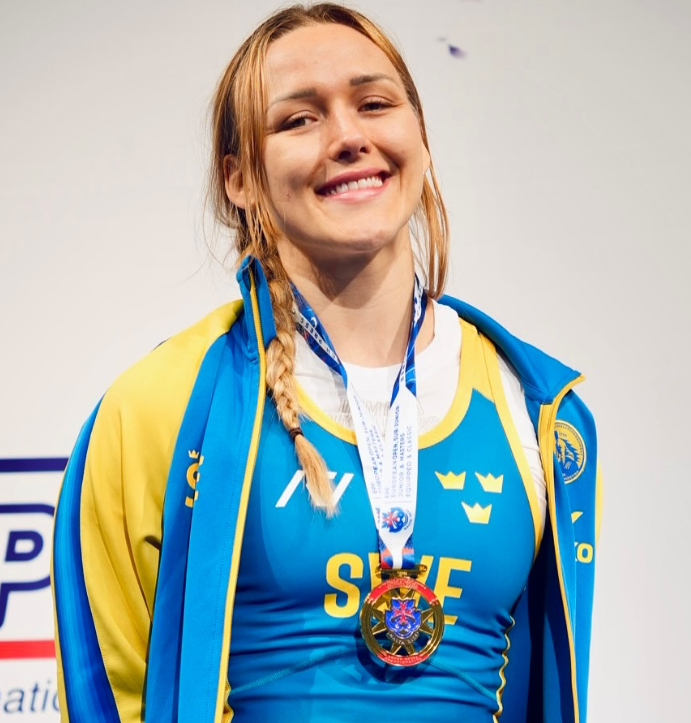
- Åkesson in 2025

Personal information
- Nickname: Ellen Viking
- Born: 20 March 1999 (age 27) Skurup, Sweden
- Education: Linköping University
- Height: 166 cm (5 ft 5 in)
- Military service
- Branch: Swedish Army
- Unit: South Skåne Regiment

Sport
- Sport: Powerlifting, arm wrestling
Medal record
Powerlifting
Representing Sweden
FISU World University Powerlifting Championships
1st	2024	63 kg
Western European Powerlifting Championships
1st	2024	63 kg
World University Powerlifting Cup
2nd	2023	69 kg
European Classic University Powerlifting Cup
2nd	2023	63 kg
European Bench Press Championships
5th	2025	69 kg
IPF World Classic & Equipped Bench Press Championships
6th	2025	69 kg
Arm wrestling
Representing Sweden
IFA World Armwrestling Championships
2nd	2024	63 kg (left)
2nd	2024	63 kg (right)
1st	2025	70 kg (left)
1st	2025	70 kg (right)
IFA European Armwrestling Championships
4th	2025	70 kg (left)
3rd	2025	70 kg (right)

Ellen Brönmark Åkesson (born 20 March 1999) is a Swedish powerlifter, arm wrestler, and professional wrestler. She has been described as "Sweden's strongest woman".

== Powerlifting career ==
Åkesson developed an interest in powerlifting at the age of 17 upon being drafted for military service and performing well in an IsoKai isokinetic lift test. She began training at a gym in Skurup. She began competing in powerlifting contests in 2021. That November, she became the Swedish junior champion in powerlifting, lifting a total of 400 kilograms across bench press, deadlift, and squat.

In February 2023, Åkesson competed at the Swedish Championships in Skövde in the 63 kilogram weight class, winning gold medals for bench press (lifting 97.5 kilograms) and for classic powerlifting (lifting a total of 425 kilograms across the three lifts). In March 2023, Åkesson placed second in the European Classic University Powerlifting Cup in Albi, France, setting European University Sports Association records in the 63 kilogram weight class for deadlifting (190 kilograms) and bench press (100 kilograms). In October 2023, Åkesson competed in the World University Powerlifting Cup in Kranjska Gora, Slovenia, placing second in the 69 kilogram weight class.

In July 2024, Åkesson won the 63 kilogram contest at the International University Sports Federation World University Powerlifting Championships in Tartu, Estonia, lifting a total of 440.5 kilograms across the three lifts. In September 2024, she won the 63 kilogram contest at the XV Western European Powerlifting Championships in St. Paul's Bay, Malta, lifting a total of 460 kilograms across the three lifts.

In February 2025, Åkesson won a gold medal at the Swedish championships in Borås in the 69 kilogram weight class, lifting a total of 490 kilograms across the three lifts. During she contest, she set her records for deadlifting (212.5 kilograms) and squat (162.5 kilograms). That same year, she placed fifth in the European Bench Press Championships in Valletta, Malta, sixth in the International Powerlifting Federation World Classic & Equipped Bench Press Championships in Drammen, Norway, and fifteenth in the European Powerlifting Federation's European Open Classic Powerlifting Championships in Malaga, Spain, all in the 69 kilogram weight class. The Swedish strength sports magazine MAXstyrka named Åkesson its Female Athlete of the Year for 2025.

== Arm wrestling career ==
In March 2024, Åkesson competed in arm wrestling at the Swedish Championships in Luleå, winning a silver medal. In September–October 2024, she competed in the International Federation of Armwrestling (IFA) World Armwrestling Championships in Loutraki, Greece in the 63 kilogram division, placing second in both the left and right contests.

In February 2025, Åkesson won gold medals at the Swedish championships in Borås in both the left and right contests; the arm wrestling contest began at the same time as the powerlifting contest, forcing Åkesson to rush between the two contests. In May 2025, she competed in the IFA European Armwrestling Championships in Pärnu, Estonia in the 70 kilogram division, placing third in the right contest and fourth in the left contest. In October–November that year, she competed in the IFA World Armwrestling Championships in Baku, Azerbaijan in the 70 kilogram division, winning both the right and left contests. In December 2025, she defeated veteran arm wrestler Petra Damm in a contest at the "Clash of Arms" festival in Solnahallen.

== Professional wrestling career ==
In August 2025, Åkesson attended a try-out with the American professional wrestling promotion WWE in New Jersey in the United States during its SummerSlam pay-per-view. In March 2026, WWE announced that it had signed Åkesson to a contract and assigned her to the WWE Performance Center in Orlando, Florida in the United States. She made her first appearance for WWE at the July 28, 2026 WWE NXT tapings, giving a promo. On September 4, Åkesson was released from WWE without wrestling in an official match.

== Other media ==
Ellen Åkesson

Twitch information
- Channel: EllenViking
- Years active: 2017–present
- Genre: Gaming
- Followers: 112k
- Last updated: 30 May 2026

Åkesson began streaming on Twitch in 2017; by 2025, she had over 100,000 followers. In 2023, she founded the marketing company Akessonellen AB. In 2023, she took part in the Nordic Fitness Expo in Västerås. In 2024, she starred in a billboard campaign in Stockholm for the esports company DreamHack.

== Personal life ==
Åkesson grew up in Skurup in Skåne County, where as a youth she took part in acrobatics, swimming, volleyball, and circus. In 2016, she was the "Lucia" for Skurup's Saint Lucy's Day procession. She attended Linköping University, studying cognitive science. She performed military service as part of the South Skåne Regiment.
