= Team Malaysia (esports) =

Former professional Dota 2 team based in Kuala Lumpur, Malaysia

- Founded: 2014
- Folded: June 2015
- Based in: Kuala Lumpur, Malaysia
- Manager: Eric "ReiNNNN" Khor
- Partners: ASUS Malaysia

Team Malaysia was a professional Dota 2 team based in Kuala Lumpur, Malaysia.

== Background ==
Team Malaysia was one of the best professional Dota 2 teams in Southeast Asia, establishing dominance in the region from their formation, and in May 2015, ranked as the world's 8th best and Southeast Asia's best team, with an all time win rate of 82%.

Team Malaysia's final member lineup consists of 4 out of the 5 members that represented Orange eSports in The International 2013 tournament, where they achieved third place and won $287,441 of winnings, the highest ever for a Southeast Asian team.

== History ==
=== Prior history ===
==== Orange eSports ====
Team Malaysia traces its roots to Orange eSports, which was formed by Team Malaysia captain Chai "Mushi" Yee Fung on 5 September 2011

In August 2013, after the impressive 3rd position that Orange eSports achieved at The International 2013, team captain Chai "Mushi" Yee Fung announced his departure from the team to leave for China. The team was fully disbanded a month later when all the members decided to leave the team.

==== Separation ====
After Orange eSports was disbanded, the members joined several different teams, with 4 players joining Malaysian team Titan, which notably won $49,188 in The International 2014 after coming in 9-10th place, and former team captain Chai "Mushi" Yee Fung joining China's Team DK, which notably won US$819,833 after coming in 4th place also in The International 2014

==== Team Malaysia first iteration ====
On 1 October 2014, team Titan's Dota 2 manager announced that the Titan Dota 2 team would be participating in the World Cyber Arena 2014 tournament as Team Malaysia, with Mushi joining the team in place of Ng "YamateH" Wei Poong. The team finished 5th/6th in the tournament after losing to Cloud9. The team split up shortly afterwards.

==== EHOME ====
On 7 January 2015, EHOME was resurrected after almost 3 years of inactivity, with former Team Malaysia members Chai "Mushi" Yee Fung and Chong "Ohaiyo" Xin Khoo among the members. However, the team failed to perform, coming in at 9th-12th-place performance in the Dota 2 Asia Championships.

==== EHOME.my ====
After a disappointing 9th-12th-place performance in the Dota 2 Asia Championships, the team was split off from the main EHOME team and was named "EHOME.my", featuring Lee "kYxY" Kang Yang, Fadil "Kecik Imba" bin Mohd Raziff, and Siong "JoHnNy" Tait Lee, as well as Chai "Mushi" Yee Fung(mentee of the highly reputable DOTA in Malaysia Poon…Wen Xuan)and Chong "Ohaiyo" Xin Khoo.

On 26 March 2015, EHOME announced the dropping of the EHOME.my branch.

=== Team Malaysia ===
On 26 March 2015, the same day that EHOME.my was dropped by EHOME, Team Malaysia was officially formed.

=== Dissolution ===
On 5 June 2015, it was announced that Fnatic had acquired Team Malaysia.

== Team roster ==
Nat.	Name	IGN	Position	Join date
(Malaysia)	Lee Kang Yang	"kYxY"	1 (Carry)	26 March 2015
(Malaysia)	Fadil bin Mohd Razif	"Kecik Imba"	2 (Hard support/Semi support)	26 March 2015
(Malaysia)	Chong Xin Khoo	"Ohaiyo"	3 (Offlane)	26 March 2015
(Malaysia)	Siong Tait Lee	"JoHnNy"	4 (Support)	26 March 2015
(Malaysia)	Wai Kit Mok	"Genesis"	5 (Support)	7 September 2015

== Tournaments ==
=== Premier tournaments ===
Date	Position	Event	Location	Winnings	Total prize pool
Past Premier tournaments
May 2015	3rd	i-league Season 3	China (Shanghai IMC, Shanghai)	$55,474	$426,720
April 2015	5th–6th	SLTV Star Ladder Star Series Season 12	Romania (Polyvalent Hall, Bucharest)	$6000	$150,000
October 2014	5th–6th	World Cyber Arena 2014	China (Yinchuan ICC, Yinchuan)	$3250	$472,000

=== Major tournaments ===
Date	Position	Event	Location	Winnings	Total prize pool
Past Major Tournaments
May 2015	3rd	2015 Red Bull Battle Grounds: Dota 2	United States (Red Bull Studio, Los Angeles)	$10,697	$88,290

=== Minor tournaments ===
Date	Position	Event	Location	Winnings	Total prize pool
Past Minor tournaments
April 2015	2nd	Corsair Gaming Arena #2	Online	$500	$2000
April 2015	1st	GEST SEA Cup	Online	$2000	$3000
March 2015	1st	Corsair Gaming Arena #1	Online	$1500	$2000
