= Fnatic =

Esports organisation based in London, England

- Short name: FNC
- Divisions: Apex Legends; Call of Duty: Warzone; Counter-Strike 2; Delta Force; League of Legends; Rainbow Six Siege; Trackmania; Valorant
- Founded: 23 July 2004; 22 years ago
- Location: Headquarters: London; Teams: Berlin (LoL and Valorant)
- Colors: Orange, Black, White
- CEO: Sam Mathews
- Partners: Sony, Jack Link's, Steelcase, Amazon, Betify (Counter-Strike 2), Inzone
- Website: fnatic.com

Fnatic (pronounced "fanatic"; also stylised as fnatic or FNATIC) is a professional esports organisation headquartered in London, England. Founded on 23 July 2004, it has players from around the world competing in several games.

Fnatic's League of Legends team competes in the League of Legends EMEA Championship (LEC) and is one of the most successful organisations in the league. The team won the first League of Legends World Championship in 2011, and it held the record for most LEC titles from 2011 to 2020.

Fnatic's Counter-Strike team, which has traditionally been located in Sweden, won the first ever CS:GO Major in 2013 and two more between 2013 and 2015. After a series of poor results dating back to the start of 2021, Fnatic made a move towards an international roster for the first time since 2013.

The organisation has claimed more than 200 championship victories across 30 different games since its inception in 2004. According to Forbes, Fnatic is worth $260 million (as of 2022) and is among the top 10 most valuable esports companies.

== History ==
The organisation was founded on 23 July 2004 by Sam Mathews and Anne Mathews. After playing on Fnatic's Counter-Strike team for several years, Patrik "cArn" Sättermon became the chief gaming officer of Fnatic in 2012. Wouter Sleijffers replaced Anne Mathews as CEO in 2015, while Sam Mathews is the board chairman.

Between 2008 and 2009, Fnatic was sponsored by MSI and SteelSeries, spurring a temporary name change to FnaticMSI. On 1 June 2011, Fnatic partnered with EIZO to launch their gaming monitors into the market.

In 2006, Fnatic acquired a World of Warcraft team, Fnatic. WoW. Returning to represent Fnatic in the World of Warcraft 3v3 community was players TooGood, Vo0, and Ztrider. The Fnatic. WoW division won top finishes in events including BlizzCon, Intel Extreme Masters (IEM) and Major League Gaming (MLG).

In 2007, Fnatic acquired a DotA team, Fnatic. DotA, represented by Ritter "Ritter" Rusli, Romi "melen" Gunawan, Ariyanto "Lakuci" Sony, Sugiarto "BaHaMuT" Cahyadi, Jeffry "Neo" Lu. They were formerly known as XcN DotA.

In 2008, Fnatic picked up a new DotA team with a roster of Edvin "Kwom" Börjesson, Jonathan "Loda" Berg, Rasmus "Misery" Berth, Rene "Kebap-" Werner, and Aringazin "Aidar" Aidar.

In 2010 FnaticMSI.HoN was restructured with a roster of Johan "N0tail" Sundstein, Kalle "Trixi" Saarinen, Henrik "Freshpro" Hansen, Jascha "Nova" Markuse, and Tal "Fly" Aizik.

In January 2012, Fnatic took on RaidCall as a sponsor. With the new title sponsor, Fnatic expanded into South Korea and became the first non-Korean esports team to acquire a professional gaming house in Seoul.

In 2012, Fnatic picked up the former GamersLeague Dota 2 team in order to compete with other top teams. The team placed fourth in ESWC, but soon after, the team parted ways with Fnatic.

In August 2014, Fnatic partnered with Luke Millanta to create a collection of cosmetic Counter Strike: Global Offensive weapon skins.

In 2015, Fnatic announced a return to Dota 2, acquiring and sponsoring Team Malaysia.

On 1 October 2015 sports betting website Dafabet became a sponsor of Fnatic.

On 23 March 2017, Fnatic announced that it would be making a one-off return to Heroes of Newerth with an all-Swedish roster made up of Makke, iNsaniA, Xibbe, Boxi and miCKe, and it would compete at the HonTour Season 5 World Finals in Bangkok. On 2 April 2017, Fnatic became the champions of HonTour Season 5, defeating [MiXs] Phoenix MiXs on the grand finals.

On 6 October 2017, Fnatic joined the competitive Rocket League scene after acquiring the former roster of Leftovers.

On 12 April 2018, Fnatic joined the competitive Rainbow Six Siege scene after acquiring the former roster of Mindfreak.

The company has its headquarters in London, near the Silicon Roundabout at Old Street, with a full-time senior management team including a CEO, CGO, Sales Director, Accounts Director and Head of Creative Services.

Fnatic also runs an independent digital agency, Sannpa, for businesses looking to be involved in esports.

In April 2019, Fnatic raised $19M in Series A funding round and restructured its leadership as it plans a major expansion in Asia and North America.

In October 2019, Fnatic acquired Indian PUBG Mobile team Xspark, consisting of Sc0utOP, Ronak, Paritosh, Owais and InYoDream. Fnatic disbanded the team in March 2021.

In November 2019, Fnatic announced it had entered into a partnership with Japanese company Sanrio to collaborate on content and merchandise around its Hello Kitty brand.

In October 2020, Fnatic announced a multi-year global partnership with Chinese-based global consumer electronics and home appliances market leader, Hisense. The same year Fnatic signed a multi-year partnership with BMW.

In March 2021, Fnatic announced a renewal of partnership with a global online gaming entertainment service "LeTou" and would serve as official sponsors for their DOTA 2 squad.

In November 2022, Fnatic launched its own music label, Fnatic Music. The announcement coincided with the album Fnatic Island Vol. 1.

On 6 May 2024, the Esports World Cup Foundation, funded by the Saudi Arabia Public Investment Fund and organizers of the Esports World Cup tournament series, announced the 30 organizations (known in the ESWC as Clubs) who would make up the Club Support Program, with Fnatic being one of them. This program gives teams a one-time six-figure stipend if an organization is willing to enter new esports as well as additional funding each year if they drive viewership and fan engagement to the Esports World Cup.

== Current divisions ==
=== Counter-Strike ===
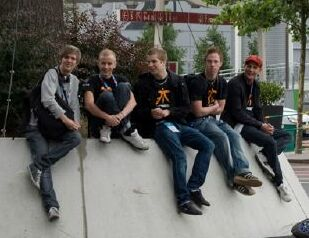
The Fnatic Counter-Strike team in 2007

==== Counter-Strike: Source and 1.6 ====
Fnatic entered the Counter-Strike competitive scene in 2004, when the team was founded by Freek "FraK" Tammelling. The initial roster, led by Benjamin "diGitaL" Hildén, managed to win CPL Singapore 2005 but struggled to make much of an impact at other international events. At the beginning of 2006, Fnatic released the entire line-up except for sniper Harley "dsn" Örwall, who was tasked to assemble a new roster. Örwall recruited Patrik "cArn" Sättermon, the in-game leader of Eyeballers; Oscar "Archi" Torgersen, from Team GoN; and Begrip duo Patrik "f0rest" Lindberg and Kristoffer "Tentpole" Nordlund. This line-up would go on to win many major events in 2006, culminating with a 1st-place finish at CPL Winter 2006. In 2011, Fnatic's Counter-Strike team placed top three in many events with their newly acquired player, Michael "Friis" Jørgensen. This simultaneously led to dropping many uncontracted players such as Qet (Counter-Strike), Lauke (UT) and Vo0 (Q3).

cArn gained a reputation as one of Counter-Strike's premier in-game leaders and strategy callers from 2006 to 2012 due to his ability to lead several completely different Fnatic rosters to major tournament wins. However, in March 2012, he announced his surprise retirement before the IEM Season VI World Finals, going on to become the first chief gaming officer for Fnatic. Xizt took on the role of the in-game leader, replacing cArn with Finn "karrigan" Andersen, another Danish player. The new team won their first major LAN event at Copenhagen Games 2012. On the same weekend, FnaticRC.aLive won his first ever major tournament at IPL4 Las Vegas.

After Fnatic won 2012 DreamHack Summer and the Swedish Championships, Rasmus "Gux" Stahl retired from Counter-Strike, leaving an open spot in Fnatic. On 26 June, Fnatic announced that Martin "trace" Heldt would join the team. In August, Richard "Xizt" Landstorm left the team to play CS:GO for NiP; Emil "FYRR73" Karlsson was announced as his replacement.

==== Counter-Strike: Global Offensive ====
When Fnatic switched to Counter Strike: Global Offensive, they became one of the top teams in the world. In order to complete the roster, Fnatic announced that Xyp9x and JOKERN would join them to compete in Counter Strike: Global Offensive. The team was able to finish in the 3rd/4th position of the EMS Season 1 Finals.

In late 2013, Fnatic won the first ever major tournament in Counter Strike: Global Offensive, under the guidance of their new leader, Markus "pronax" Wallsten, taking out the team Ninjas in Pyjamas (NIP). In 2014, Fnatic took in 2 ex-LGB players, Olof "olofmeister" Kajbjer and Freddy "KRIMZ" Johansson. They went on to win ESL One Katowice 2015 after defeating NIP, and on 24 August 2015, Fnatic won ESL One Cologne 2015, after defeating Team EnVyUs. Because of this roster's back-to-back major wins and eleven other international titles, some consider this Fnatic team to be the strongest roster ever assembled in the history of CS:GO.

In November 2015, after a few disappointing tournament performances, pronax decided to take a hiatus from competitive CS:GO. He was replaced with Dennis "dennis" Edman from international team G2 Esports. In December 2015, Fnatic beat NIP 2–1 and secured their second Fragbite Masters win, the other being in season 3. Fnatic regained the #1 position in HLTV's team rankings after the tournament, and remained the #1 ranked team in the world until 18 April 2016.

In April 2016 olofmeister suffered a wrist injury, and John "wenton" Eriksson took his place temporarily.

On 15 August 2016 Fnatic announced that Robin "flusha" Rönnquist, Jesper "JW" Wecksell, and KRIMZ would be transferred to GODSENT and the team would be welcoming Simon "twist" Eliasson and Jonas "Lekr0" Olofsson in return. Wenton, who was already a substitute for Fnatic, completed the line-up.

On 20 August 2017 Fnatic announced that olofmeister would depart from Fnatic to join FaZe Clan, and dennis would also leave Fnatic and join GODSENT; they were replaced by Maikil "Golden" Selim and Lekr0.

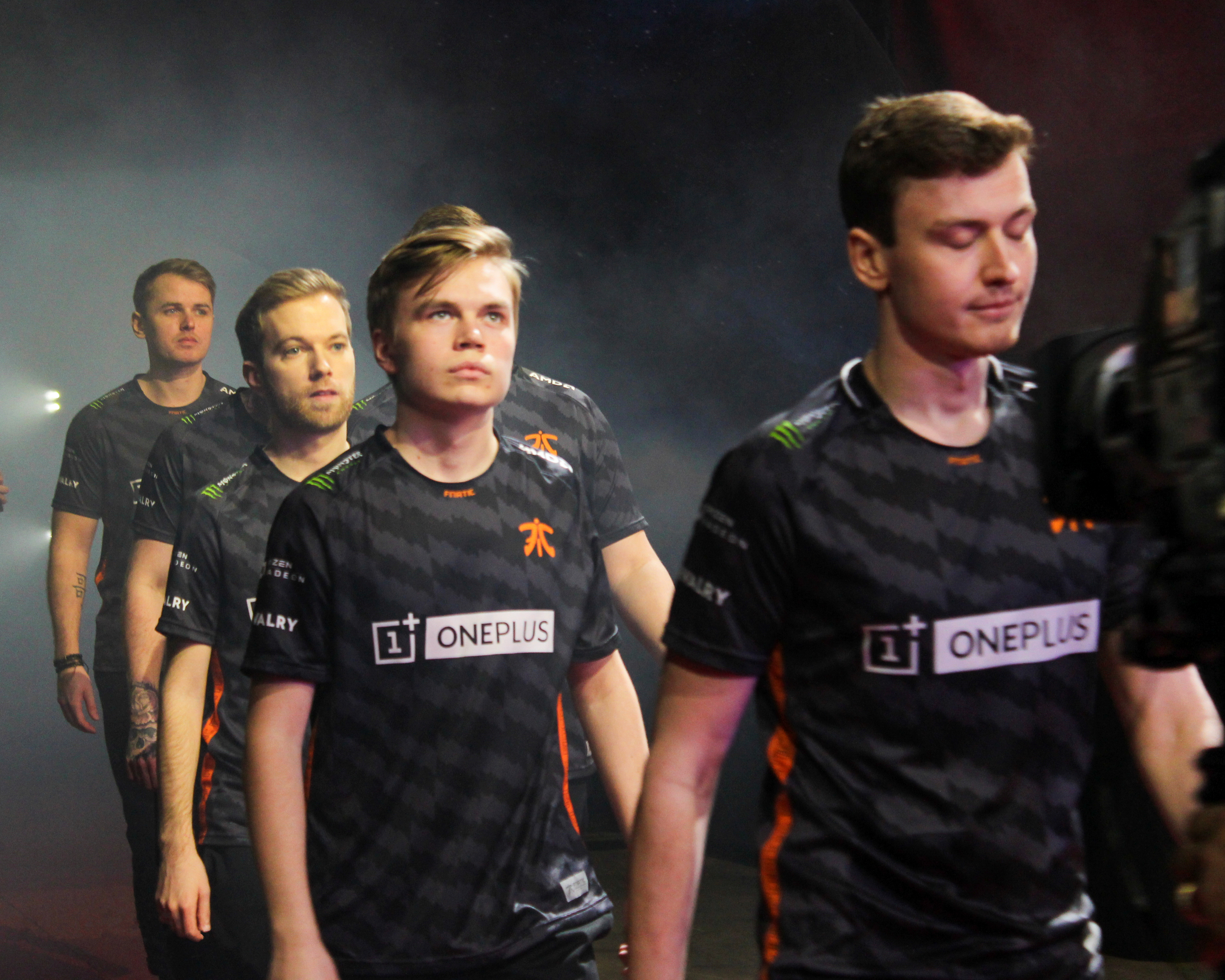
Fnatic at IEM Sydney 2019

In September 2019, flusha and Golden, two previous squad members, rejoined the team. Following this roster move, Fnatic enjoyed some success, until at the start of 2021 there were more changes, with flusha stepping down from the team's active roster, to be replaced by the 21 year old talent Jack "Jackinho" Ström Mattsson. after this change, the team had a slew of losses, falling over the next six months to a near all-time low of position #65 on the HLTV team ranking. As a result of this, the decision was made to change things up, with the roster becoming, for the first time, an international one following the addition of UK players Alexander "ALEX" McMeekin and William "mezii" Merriman and the benching of JW and Golden.

This change was positive at first for Fnatic, leading to good performances at ESL Pro League XIV, and allowed them to regain a spot amongst the top 20 HLTV teams; however, following a bad performance at IEM Fall 2021, where they failed to win a single match, Fnatic failed to qualify for the 2021 Stockholm Major, and shortly afterward, Jackinho was benched from the team. Owen "smooya" Butterfield was signed to replace Jackinho on a 3-month trial. The addition of smooya marked the first time in the history of Fnatic fielded a British majority line-up. After poor results at Katowice 2022 in February, smooya was benched and replaced by the Romanian sniper Iulian "regali" Harjău, shortly before qualification for the PGL Major Antwerp 2022.

In March 2022, Brollan who had been with Fnatic since 2018 and during that time made the HLTV top 20 players twice, was transferred to NIP. Valentin "poizon" Vasilev and Peppe "Peppzor" Borak were added to the roster to replace smooya and Brollan, although poizon only on trial and Peppzor temporarily moved up from the academy team. After not achieving desired results, ALEX and poizon were benched and Peppzor was returned to the Fnatic Rising academy team, leaving only KRIMZ and mezii in the team.

In an attempt to better results, the Danish duo Nico "nicoodoz" Tamjidi and Fredrik "roeJ" Jørgensen were transferred from Copenhagen Flames to Fnatic, in June. In August, to complete the roster the Dutch rifler Dion "FASHR" Derksen was added to the roster. Furthermore, mezii took the position of in-game leader after it was left vacant after the departure of ALEX.

After three years of not attending a Major, with the last being the IEM Katowice Major 2019 where Fnatic finished 12–14th in the Challengers Stage, they managed to qualify for the IEM Rio Major 2022 Challengers Stage. Fnatic would go on to make it past the Challengers and Legends Stage, before being eliminated by Outsiders in the quarter-finals. They then qualified to the Legends Stage of the Blast Paris Major 2023, but failed to qualify for the playoffs, being eliminated in the 2–2 bracket by Into The Breach.

Following the withdrawal of Virtus.pro, after its players failed to obtain visas, Fnatic attended IEM Dallas 2023. F0rest stood in for KRIMZ for the tournament where they were eliminated early, following losses to MOUZ and 9z.

On 30 June 2023, FASHR left the team to join OG, and later that year, on 4 July, Fnatic announced that nicoodoz was benched from the active roster. Fnatic replaced the departing players on 6 July 2023, signing previous MOUZ player Christopher "dexter" Nong and former LDLC player Aurélien "afro" Drapier. Nicoodoz left the bench and joined Danish roster Preasy on 29 July 2023.

Fnatic qualified to the group stages of IEM Cologne 2023, following victories over Complexity Gaming and 9INE. They accomplished a victory over Cloud9, before being knocked down to the lower group by ENCE where they were eliminated by GamerLegion, finishing 9–12th.

On 18 May 2023, prior to the roster changes, Fnatic qualified for the Saudi Arabian Gamers8 2023 tournament. Fnatic were eliminated early from the tournament on 16 August, following a 2–0 loss to Cloud9.

Fnatic attended ESL Pro League Season 18 with their opening match played on 13 September, a 2–1 victory over Imperial Esports. The team would go on to drop to the lower bracket following a 2–1 loss against FaZe, before qualifying for the playoffs after wins against Chinese roster 5yclone and Apeks. Fnatic were eliminated in the first round of playoffs by Monte in a 2–1 defeat.

==== Counter-Strike 2 ====
On 2 November 2023, Fnatic announced the departure of mezii amid reports of his move to Team Vitality. Later that month, on 11 November, roeJ transferred to Preasy. Dexter was benched from the roster on 24 November, reducing the active roster to just KRIMZ and afro. Ahead of Elisa Masters Espoo 2023, on 27 November Fnatic announced the signings of Alexandre "bodyy" Pianaro, Matúš "MATYS" Šimko and Can "kyuubii" Ali. Dexter left Fnatic on 11 December 2023, joining Australian team Grayhound Gaming.

=== League of Legends ===
Fnatic
- Short name: FNC
- Sport: League of Legends
- Founded: 2011
- League: LEC
- Based in: Adlershof, Treptow-Köpenick, Berlin
- Arena: Am Studio 20A
- Colors: Black and orange
- Head coach: Fabian "GrabbZ" Lohmann
- Manager: Carlos Miguel Malzahn and Alexander Hugo
- Championships: 1× World Championship (2011) List: Spring 2013; Summer 2013; Spring 2014; Spring 2015; Summer 2015; Spring 2018; Summer 2018
- Broadcasters: Riot Games, Twitch
- Website: fnatic.com/players/LoL/

==== Season 1 ====
Fnatic entered the League of Legends scene in March 2011 by acquiring the roster of the esports team myRevenge. Two months later, the squad consisting of xPeke, LaMiaZeaLoT, Shushei, CyanideFI, Mellisan and MagicFingers qualified for the Season 1 World Championship after WetDream left. Fnatic, after scoring 2–1, were crowned the Season 1 world champions.

==== Season 2 ====
In Season 2 and the preseason before it, the team participated in the Intel Extreme Masters Season VI circuit and Azubu The Champions Spring 2012, where they reached the quarter finals. After that, the team lost many of its players. Between June and September 2012, Shuhei, Mellisan, Pheilox, and Lamia moved on and were replaced by sOAZ, and nRated. Among these roster changes, the team did not manage to qualify for the Season 2 World Championship after losing the deciding series in the Regional Finals with 0–2 against Counter Logic Gaming EU.

==== Season 3 ====
In the Season 3 preseason, Rekkles joined the team and Fnatic won DreamHack Winter 2012, finished second at IPL 5 in Las Vegas and IEM Season VII – Global Challenge Cologne. Rekkles did not meet the minimal age requirements for Riot's Season 3 League Championship Series and was replaced by YellOwStaR on 26 December.

In 2013, Fnatic won the Spring Split of Season 3, but during the Summer Split, the team struggled and decided that a player change was necessary. In July 2013, Fnatic announced changes to their League of Legends roster. nRated, the main support, left the team and YellOwstaR, the former AD carry, switched roles to play support. Puszu then joined the team in their Cologne gaming house to finish Season 3 as Fnatic's AD Carry. Fnatic later won the Season 3 Summer Split and qualified for the World Championship in Los Angeles, California.

During the group stage of the Season 3 World finals, Fnatic went into the quarter-finals against Cloud9. After defeating Cloud9 2–1, Fnatic advanced to the semi-finals against Royal Club Huang Zu. They later lost against Royal Club and tied for third place.

==== Season 4 ====
In the 2014 season, Rekkles rejoined the team and Fnatic secured their third LCS title after defeating SK Gaming in the playoffs final of the Spring Split. The Summer Split saw Fnatic struggle against Alliance in another playoffs final. However, Fnatic had collected enough points to qualify for the 2014 World Championship.

The World Championship saw Fnatic placed in Group C with Korea's Samsung Blue, China's OMG, and North America's LMQ. The team was only able to win 2 out of 6 matches, officially terminating the team's chances of progressing.

==== Season 5 ====
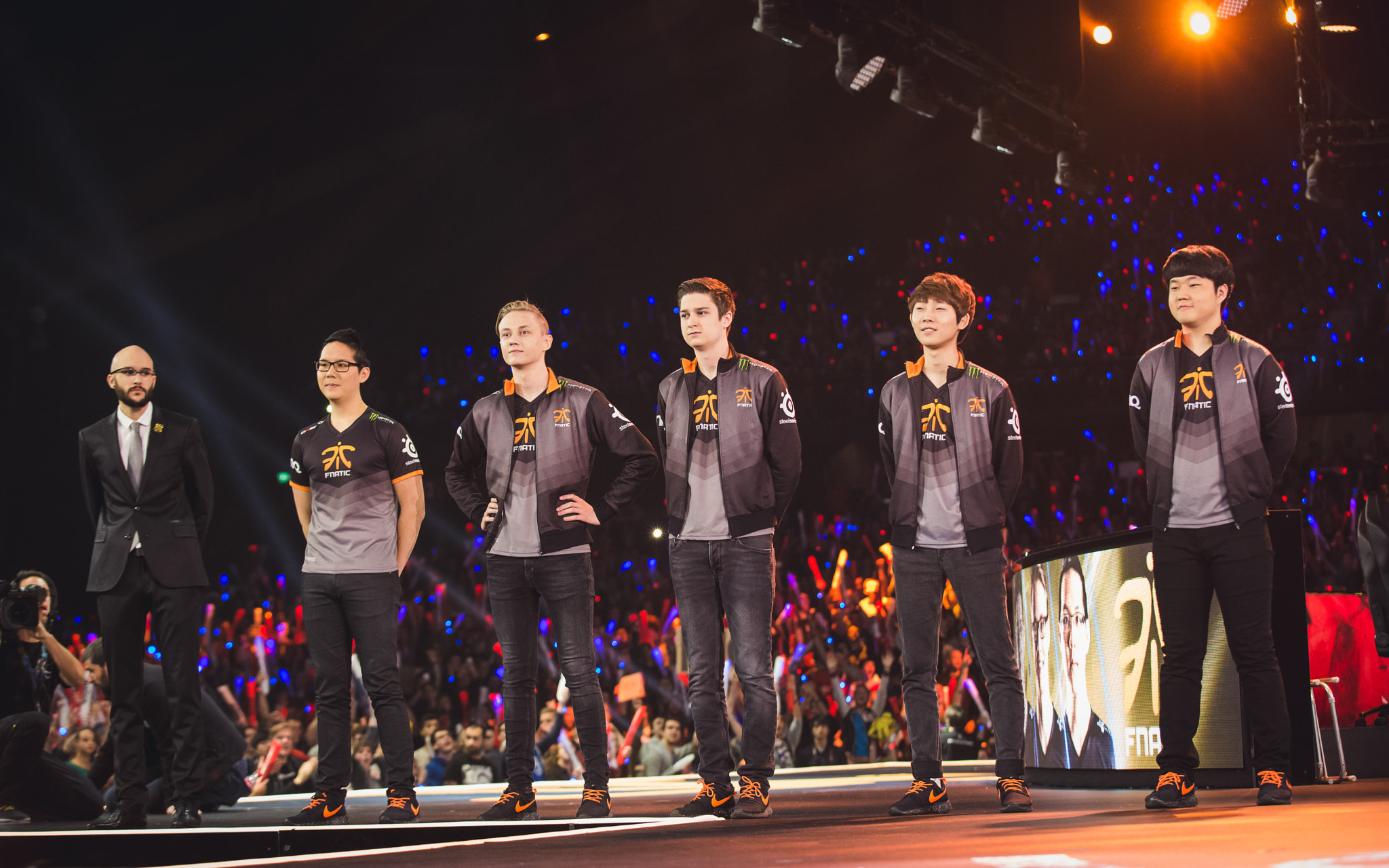
Fnatic on stage at the 2015 League of Legends World Championship semi-finals

In the 2015 preseason, sOAZ, Rekkles, xPeke and Cyanide left Fnatic and were replaced by Huni, Reignover, Febiven, and Steeelback.

Fnatic won the 2015 Spring Split after beating the Unicorns of Love on 19 April 2015 in Madrid, Spain in the playoffs grand final that went 3–2 in favour of Fnatic. They would later attend the Mid-Seasonal Invitational, an international competition attended by the top teams of each region. They went 2–3 in the group stage and made it to the playoffs. They were matched against former world champion SK Telecom T1, to whom they lost 2–3.

In the 2015 EU LCS Summer Split, Fnatic became the first LCS team to complete a regular split undefeated, finishing with a score of 18 wins and 0 losses. They would go on to win the 2015 EU Summer Split Playoffs, beating Origen 3–2, and qualifying for the 2015 League of Legends World Championship as the first seed from Europe.

In the 2015 League of Legends World Championship, Fnatic took first place Group B in the group stage with a 4–2 record. In the quarterfinals they defeated the Chinese team EDward Gaming with a score of 3–0. In the semifinal, they lost to the Korean team KOO Tigers with a score of 0–3, giving them a third/fourth-place finish in the tournament.

==== Season 6 ====
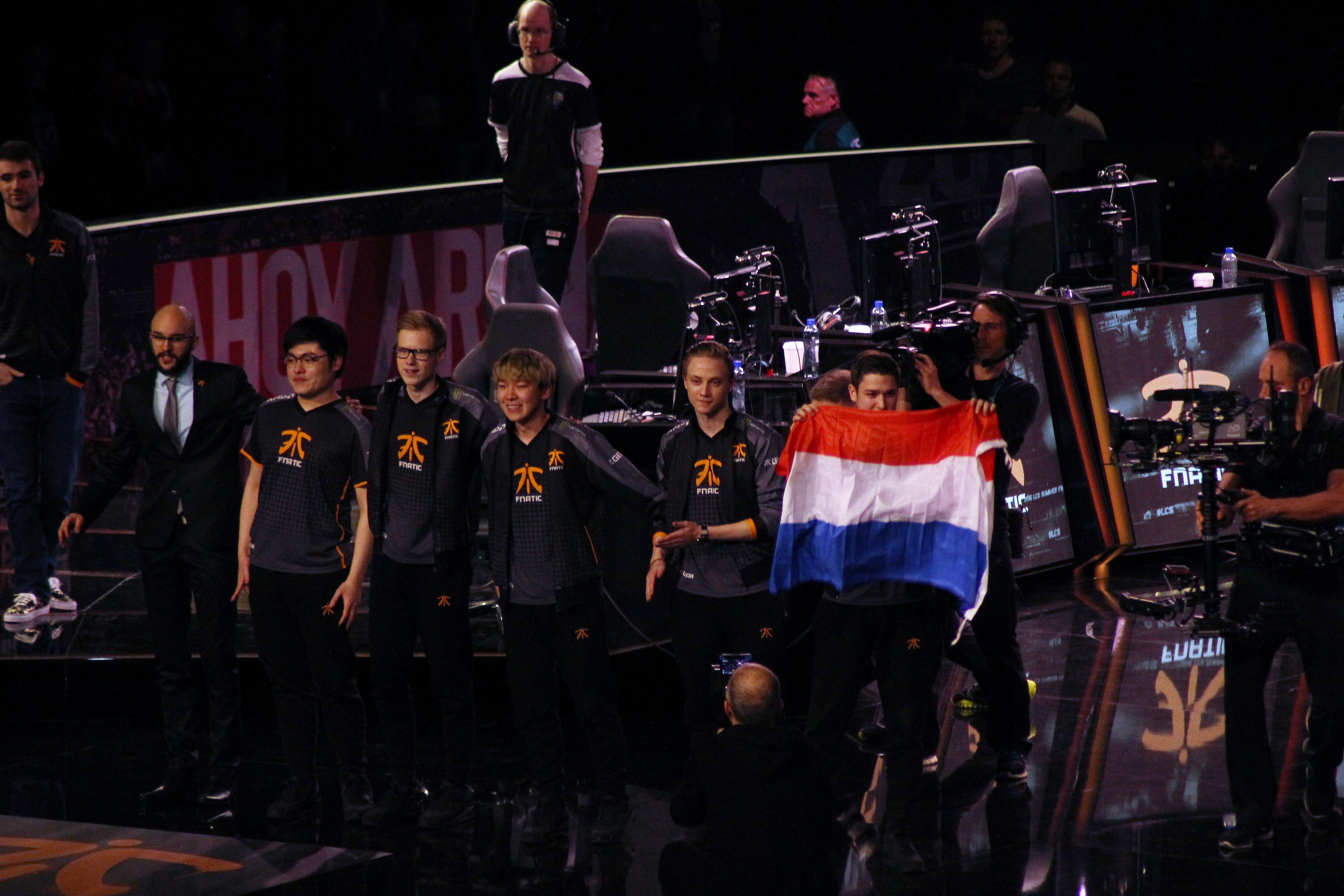
Fnatic on stage at the 2016 League of Legends European Championship finals

The 2016 preseason saw the departure of Huni, Reignover and Yellowstar from the team. It was then announced that they would be replaced by Spirit, Gamsu and NoxiaK, respectively.

In the 2016 Spring Split, the team struggled in the beginning, but the replacement of NoxiaK by Klaj caused Fnatic to advance to the final of the Intel Extreme Masters Katowice where they lost 0–3 against SKT T1. The team finished the split in sixth place and made it to the playoffs where they upset Team Vitality 3–1 before losing to eventual champions G2 Esports 3–1 in the semifinals. They then defeated H2k Gaming 3–2 to secure third place overall.

A month later, Fnatic announced the return of Yellowstar to the line-up for the 2016 Spring Split.

On 13 May 2016, Fnatic announced the departure of Gamsu from the starting line-up. He was replaced by former G2 Esports top laner Mateusz "Kikis" Szkudlarek. Kikis debuted with Fnatic during the start of the 8th week of the EU LCS. Fnatic finished the 2016 EU LCS Summer Split regular season in 4th after a playoff match against H2k-Gaming. They would go on to play H2k again in the playoffs. Fnatic parted ways with head coach Luis "Deilor" Sevilla and replaced him with Nicholas "NicoThePico" Korsgård. After their series against H2k was delayed due to technical issues, H2k defeated Fnatic 3–0 on 16 August 2016.

==== Season 7 ====
In 2017, Fnatic took 3rd place in both 2017 EU LCS season splits.

==== Season 8 ====
After acquiring Zdravets "Hylissang" Galabov for the Support role during the off-season, the new Fnatic roster, now also featuring Mads "Broxah" Brock-Pedersen as the starting Jungler, saw immediate improvements to their performance, and would go on to win both the 2018 EU LCS spring title. They would also win the 2018 LEC summer title. The league rebranded halfway through the year overcoming their rivals G2 Esports in spring, and Schalke 04 in summer.

During MSI 2018 the team managed to make it past the group stage after a tie-breaker against the LCS champions, Team Liquid, but would be defeated in the playoffs after being clean swept by the LPL representatives and eventual tournament winners Royal Never Give Up.

During the 2018 EU LCS Summer Split the team, Fnatic would be forced to bench Rekkles and promote their top lane substitute Gabriël "Bwipo" Rau to the starting position after new meta developments left marksmen heavily unfavorable across all levels of play, though the former would eventually return after the meta changes were partially reverted by Riot.

During Worlds 2018, Fnatic would make it through the group stage only losing once to the China's Invictus Gaming as well as losing the tiebreaker, and advance to the Playoffs Stage. The team would successfully defeat China's Edward Gaming, 3–1, and clean sweep North America's Cloud9 in the semifinals match. After these victories, Fnatic would reach the World Championship Finals, the first time since 2011, and the second time ever for any western team, where they would meet their Group Stage competitors Invictus Gaming again. IG would win against Fnatic in every game and clean sweep them to win the 2018 World Championship.

==== Season 9 ====
In the 2019 LEC spring split, Fnatic finished in 3rd place. In the summer split they reached the final. When playing against G2 Esports, they were already leading 2–0 at one point, but subsequently lost 2–3. They played the 2019 League of Legends World Championship as 2nd seed from Europe where they reached the quarter-finals, losing 1–3 against FunPlus Phoenix.

==== Season 10 ====
In 2020, Fnatic reached the final in both the spring and summer LEC splits. In them, they lost 0–3 twice to the G2 Esports team. At the 2020 League of Legends World Championship, just like the year before, Fnatic reached the quarter-finals. They lost there against Chinese Top Esports, at one point leading 2–0, but losing 2–3 after the match.

==== Season 11 ====
In 2021, Fnatic departed Martin Rekkles Larsson, who moved to G2 Esports at the end of his contract. In his place, Upset entered the squad. Fnatic in the 2021 LEC spring split, in which they only finished 5th, lost 0–3 against Schalke 04 Esports in the play-offs. In the summer split, Fnatic reached the final, where they lost 1–3 against MAD Lions, finishing in 2nd place. At the 2021 League of Legends World Championship, Fnatic in the group stage finished with a score of 1–5.

==== Season 12 ====
In 2022, Fnatic finished 3rd in both the spring and summer 2022 LEC splits. In the spring, they lost in the semifinals 0–3 against G2 Esports, and for the summer they lost 1–3 against Rogue. At 2022 League of Legends World Championship, they went through the play-ins. In the group phase, they won their first two games against Cloud9 and T1, but lost the next four. Fnatic did not advance to the next phase of the competition.

==== Season 13 ====
Fnatic made several line-up changes for the 2023 LEC season. After five years, Support Zdravets "Hylissang" Galabov left the team. Ruben "Rhuckz" Barbosa was brought in from Fnatic's academy team in Galabov's place. In the ADC position, Elias "Upset" Lipp was replaced by Martin "Rekkles" Larsson, who returned to the organization after two years. Fielding this new roster in the Winter Split, Fnatic finished a disappointing 9th place, failing to make playoffs for the first time in the team's history. Going into the Spring Split, Fnatic modified the roster again, replacing Wunder and Rhuckz in promoting the players Oscarinin and Advienne. Once again, Fnatic finished poorly in 8th place. For the Summer Split, Fnatic would further change the roster by acquiring Support Adrian "Trymbi" Trybus and importing Korean ADC Oh "Noah" Hyeon-Taek. This iteration of the team qualified to playoffs, demanding yet another roster change when Toplaner Oscarinin injured his hand, leading the team to field Wunder once again. Ultimately, Fnatic finished second in the LEC's Season Finals and qualified to the 2023 World Championships, ending the year's run at the tournament's Swiss Stage.

==== Honours ====
===== Domestic =====
- LEC
  - Winners (7): 2013 Spring, 2013 Summer, 2014 Spring, 2015 Spring, 2015 Summer, 2018 Spring, 2018 Summer

===== International =====
- World Championship
  - Winners (1): 2011

=== Mobile Legends: Bang Bang ===
On 9 May 2024, in Fnatic's announcement video regarding their participation in the Esports World Cup Club Support Program (funded by the EWCF), the organization announced that they were to field a Mobile Legends: Bang Bang roster, although it wasn't immediately announced which team they were signing. On 20 May it was announced that Fnatic would go into a partnership with ONIC Philippines, a brother team of the Indonesia-based ONIC Esports organization that plays in the MPL Philippines, with the team known as Fnatic ONIC Philippines (or Fnatic ONIC PH). On 22 May, it was announced that ONIC's Indonesian MLBB team also partnered with Fnatic, with that team known as Fnatic ONIC Esports.

On 4 January 2025, ONIC Esports announced that the partnership between Fnatic and ONIC are thereby terminated and have officially parted ways, returning to its normal branding and thereby folding Fnatic's representation in MLBB.

=== Rainbow Six Siege ===
On 12 April 2018, Fnatic signed their first Tom Clancy's Rainbow Six Siege team just days before the Season 7 APAC (Asia Pacific) Finals where they placed first, beating Japanese rivals, PET Nora-Rengo. Fnatic acquired the former Australian roster of Mindfreak. The original roster consisted of Matthew "Acez" McHenry, Jason "Lusty" Chen, Etienne "Magnet" Rousseau, Daniel "NeophyteR" An, Ethan "RizRaz" Wombwell, and Jayden "Dizzle" Saunders as coach.

On 19 May 2018, Fnatic went out in the quarter finals of the Season 7 Finals losing to eventual champions Team Liquid. On 17 November 2018, Fnatic unexpectedly beat top North American team, Evil Geniuses 2–0 in a stunning upset in the Season 8 Finals. The following day, Fnatic fell to G2 Esports without winning a single round in either of the played maps, losing 6–0, 6–0, and placing 3–4th in the event.

On 30 November 2018, Fnatic signed Jake "Virtue" Grannan as a sixth player after having their coach, Dizzle, substitute for Magnet after he contracted appendicitis, leaving Fnatic a man down in the Season 8 Finals, where they surprisingly upset against Evil Geniuses. Virtue officially replaced NeophyteR after the latter left in early March 2019 after having Virtue play for him on many events since his signing. On 12 March 2019, Fnatic signed Ryan "Speca" Ausden as a sixth player after Virtue filled NeophyteR's spot. On 19 May 2019, Fnatic placed 3–4th in the Season 9 Finals after beating their rivals, PET Nora-Rengo in the quarter finals but losing to eventual champions Team Empire. Fnatic placed 13–16th in the Six Major Raleigh 2019, falling to both DarkZero Esports and FaZe Clan without taking a single map. At the Season 10 APAC Finals, Singaporean Aerowolf upset against Fnatic, winning 2–1 and stopping Fnatic from qualifying to the Season 10 Finals and possibly prevented them from reaching the Six Invitational 2020.

After a disappointing result at the Season 10 APAC Finals, RizRaz and Speca both left, with the former retiring from competitive Rainbow Six Siege. They were replaced by Tex "Tex" Thompson from fellow Australian Pro League team, Team Sinister, and the only notable Chinese player in Rainbow Six Siege, Patrick "MentalistC" Fan from Aerowolf. At the Six Invitational 2020, Fnatic stunned all by making it out of the "Group of Death" which contained Team Empire, DarkZero, and FaZe Clan, who were all considered to be the top of their regions. Fnatic later defeated reigning two-time world champions, G2, before falling to BDS Esport. After the Six Invitational, Virtue was acquired by G2 making the first ever APAC to EU transfer in Rainbow Six competitive history. Acez was returned to the main roster to replace Virtue after he was previously moved to a substitute rule.

=== Street Fighter ===
On 7 May 2024, Fnatic announced that they had signed Chris Wong to re-enter Street Fighter esports. Fnatic previously had Street Fighter players in the organization from 2018 to 2022.

=== Valorant ===
Fnatic
- Short name: FNC
- Sport: Valorant
- Founded: 2021
- League: EMEA
- Based in: London, England
- Colors: Black and orange
- Head coach: Milan "Milan" de Meij (Head Coach) Casper "Desmo" Rasmussen (Assistant Coach) Philipp "Szed" Schickor (Performance Coach)
- General manager: Colin "CoJo" Johnson
- Championships: 1× 2023 Valorant Champions Tour: Tokyo Masters 1× 2023 Valorant Champions Tour: LOCK//IN
- Stage titles: 1× VALORANT Champions Tour 2023: EMEA League 1× VALORANT Champions Tour 2024: EMEA League: Stage 1 1× VALORANT Champions Tour 2024: EMEA League: Stage 2 1× VALORANT Champions Tour 2025: EMEA League: Stage 1
- Broadcasters: Riot Games, Twitch
- Members: Jake "Boaster" Howlett Austin "Crashies" Roberts Emir Ali "Alfajer" Beder Kajetan "Kaajak" Haremski Sylvain "Veqaj" Pattyn
- Website: fnatic.com/esports/valorant/

In February 2021, Fnatic entered Valorant by acquiring the SUMN FC roster. Following mixed results, the organisation signed MAGNUM and Derke leading up to the VCT Stage 2 Challengers 2 event, replacing Moe40 and tsack. The roster finished first following a 3–1 victory against Team Liquid, but lost 2–3 to the same team in the VCT EMEA Stage 2 Challengers Finals. By placing second in this event, Fnatic qualified for the VCT Stage 2 Masters tournament in Reykjavík, Iceland. In Iceland, Fnatic finished second following a 0–3 loss against the North American side Sentinels. On 6 August 2021, MAGNUM extended their contract until 2024. Despite weaker performances in other tournaments, Fnatic qualified for 2021 Valorant Champions on circuit points, where they finished 5–8th following a 1–2 loss against KRÜ Esports.

Ahead of the 2022 season, Fnatic signed BraveAF to replace Doma. BraveAF was suspended from the roster on 30 March 2022 following a leaked conversation regarding the 2022 Russian invasion of Ukraine. BraveAF later stated that " We had a little chat before 24th of feb and I wrote her in the morning of 24th feb to know if she's alright.", stating that he is for peace. Fearoth joined the team on loan from Alliance as a replacement ahead of the 2022 Valorant Champions Tour Stage 2 Masters in Reykjavík. H1ber was loaned from KOI following a positive COVID-19 test for Derke. Fnatic finished 11–12th at the event following a 0–2 loss against the Japanese ZETA Division. On 10 May 2022, Fnatic signed Enzo (previously known as Fearoth), as a full-time member, as well as Alfajer to complete the roster. MAGNUM left the team on 9 June to join KOI. The new roster finished first at the EMEA Stage 2 Challengers after beating FunPlus Phoenix 3–0 in the finals, handing them a direct invite to 2022 Valorant Champions Tour: Stage 2 Masters tournament. Fnatic finished fourth following a 1–2 loss against FunPlus Phoenix.

On 21 September 2022, Fnatic was selected as a partner to compete in the Valorant Champions Tour EMEA. Following this announcement, Mistic and Enzo both announced free agency from the organisation and were placed on the bench.

On 4 March 2023, Fnatic narrowly beat LOUD 3–2 in the finals of LOCK//IN São Paulo, the opening event of the VCT 2023 season. This was the first international trophy for the Fnatic Valorant team, with only Chronicle having previously lifted the Masters 3 trophy in September 2021 for Gambit Esports.

On 24 June 2023, Fnatic defeated Evil Geniuses 3–0 in the Grand Finals of Valorant Masters Tokyo, the first Masters event after Valorant franchising. This was the second international trophy for the Fnatic Valorant team, making them the first ever team in Valorant history to win two international trophies back-to-back. With this win, Chronicle is now the first Valorant player to win three international titles.

On 21 October 2023, Fnatic announced signing of Elmapuddy as the new Head Coach.

After the 2024 VCT season, star player Derke was released to free agency. On 31 October 2024, Fnatic announced his replacement, Kaajak would be joining the team for the 2025 season. On 11 December 2024, crashies was announced as Leo's temporary replacement while he fought an unknown illness.

== Former divisions ==
=== Clash Royale ===
On 3 April 2018, Fnatic announced that it was entering and competing in the upcoming Clash Royale League. They finished 7th in the group stage.

In Clash Royale League Season 2, Fnatic finished 4th in the group stage of West Region, thereby failing to qualify for finals.

=== Dota 2 ===
On 30 March 2012, Fnatic's Heroes of Newerth team, consisting of Johan "N0tail" Sundstein, Jascha "NoVa" Markuse, Tal "Fly" Aizik, and Adrian "Era" Kryeziu officially switched to Dota 2. By early September of the same year, a roster was finalised with the addition of Kai "H4nn1" Hanbückers and Kalle "Trixi" Saarinen, the latter of whom replaced Jascha "NoVa" Markuse.

In 2014, Fnatic parted ways with its Dota 2 squad with each member deciding to leave the organisation.

In 2015, Fnatic announced a return to Dota 2, acquiring the roster of Team Malaysia.

Fnatic placed 4th at The International 2016.

On 10 February 2023, Fnatic temporarily withdraws from the Dota 2 competitive scene.

=== Heroes of the Storm ===
On 9 October 2014, Fnatic expanded into Heroes of the Storm, announcing a temporary team for the BlizzCon Exhibition Tournament, featuring key players from the StarCraft II and League of Legends competitive scenes (Johan Lucchesi, Kim Hammar, Manuel Mildenberger, Cristian Lippa and Joaquim Fitas). After this event, there was a rotation of new players, notably Jonathan Gunnarsson, Simon Svensson, Thomas Cailleux, Alexandre Laignel or Lawrence Harper. The team won nearly every HOTS tournament in 2017, but the game slowly began to lose its popularity and player base. Fnatic disbanded its Heroes of the Storm division on 19 December 2018.

=== FIFA ===
In 2008, Fnatic picked up Maximo12, a Spanish FIFA football video game player who won several titles in 2008 & 2009, such as the WCG Spain Champion in 2008.

On 6 November 2019, Fnatic signed Tekkz.

=== Smite ===
On 8 November 2014, Fnatic signed its first Smite team, acquiring the roster of Exposed Secrets. The team made it to the semifinals of the Season 1 EU regional Championship but did not manage to qualify for the SMITE World Championship. On 23 December 2014 the team disbanded.

On 6 March 2015 Fnatic announced signing the roster of SK Gaming. The team competed in the Smite Pro League and finished 5th in the Summer Finals, winning $18,250.

For the Season 3 Spring Split, Fnatic announced the addition of BigManTingz and Jiffy to the team after Badgah and CaptainTwig left at the start of 2016. The team finished the season in 8th place with an 8–20 record.

The Fnatic SMITE team disbanded on 18 July 2016.

=== ShootMania Storm ===
In November 2012, Fnatic announced that they picked up a ShootMania Storm team. The team recruited Kévin "Strenx" Baéza, a former member of their previous Quake team, as well as two new players, Maikel "LeKaiM" Peeters and Jean Pierre "JiePie" Janssen. The trio won numerous small cups, and the Shootmania Launch Party, where they won $30,000. In December, Christoffer "Luxxiz" Losell joined the team after the departure of LeKaiM.

On 8 January 2014 Fnatic announced the departure of their ShootMania squad and the closure of their Shootmania division, stating a decline in quantity and quality of ShootMania tournaments as the main reason.

=== Real-time strategy games ===
With DXRacer joining the list of sponsors, Fnatic decided to expand to Korea. On 19 March 2012 they announced that they would open a Fnatic Gaming House in Seoul. They became the first foreign team to establish a permanent training facility for players in Seoul. Fnatic then acquired several talented players from the Korean StarCraft II scene. In January, "DeParture" and Warcraft legend "Moon", and "aLive" moved into the gaming house. They were coached by Hwanni, who also joined Fnatic that month. Later, OZ and Luvsic signed a contract with Fnatic. In 2012, Rain announced his retirement and left the team, followed by Byul, Ares and Moon. Only two players were left in Korea, forcing Fnatic to announce their closure of their gaming house in Seoul and the end of their contracts with aLive and OZ. Harstem was later promoted from the academy to the main roster, and the team picked up SaSe, another well known player in the scene.

=== PUBG Mobile ===
On 18 October 2019, Fnatic entered the PUBG Mobile scene after signing the roster of Indian team XSpark. Following the acquisition, Fnatic announced plans to construct a gaming facility in India. On 28 November 2019, Fnatic underwent a roster change with Inyourdream being replaced by Ash along with Pratik "Aurum" Mehra being brought in as a coach. On 22 December 2019, the team won its first offline event at the PUBG Mobile All Stars in Hyderabad, India.

On 27 January 2020, Fnatic began training at a temporary boot camp in Mumbai.

On 24 May 2021, Fnatic disbanded their PUBG Mobile roster after the game was banned in India due to tensions between China and India. PUBG Mobile was released in India by the Chinese conglomerate Tencent, and the company was banned in India due to data privacy issues.

== Rosters ==
Fnatic rosters

Apex Legends
Handle	Name	Nationality
Ein	Shōgo Kumahashi	Japan
Kernel garcia	Haruto Seki	Japan
ILY	Choi Jun-hyeok	South Korea

Call of Duty: Warzone
Handle	Name	Nationality
Resolve	Tamez, Arturo	Mexico
Vxlcom	Arcos, Joseph	Mexico
XtraJ	Enrique	Mexico

Counter-Strike 2
Handle	Name	Nationality
fear	Smyk, Rodion	Ukraine
jambo	Semera, Dmytro	Ukraine
jackasmo	Skyba, Mykyta	Ukraine
mazay	Iorhachov, Volodymyr	Ukraine
cairne	Mushynskyi, Artem	Ukraine

Delta Force
Handle	Name	Nationality
Bayn	–	France
Cyqop	Lesecq, Théo	France
RaidBull	–	France

League of Legends
Handle	Name	Nationality
Soboro	Lim Seong-min	South Korea
Razork	Martín Díaz, Iván	Spain
Vladi	Kourtidis, Vladimiros	Greece
Upset	Lipp, Elias	Germany
Lospa	Park Joon-hyeong	South Korea

Rainbow Six Siege
Handle	Name	Nationality
DEADSHT	Vojtasik, Jimmy	Switzerland
Deapek	Pieksma, Tom	Netherlands
Wizard	Morgan, Samuel	United Kingdom
CTZN	McMillan, Ben	United Kingdom
Sm1ss	Kleishmidt, Dmytro	Ukraine

Trackmania
Handle	Name	Nationality
JSwag	Koch, Jeremy	New Zealand

Valorant
Handle	Name	Nationality
Boaster	Howlett, Jake	United Kingdom
kaajak	Haremski, Kajetan	Poland
Alfajer	Beder, Emir Ali	Turkey
crashies	Roberts, Austin	United States
Cloud	Nekhozhin, Kirill	Russia
Veqaj (I)	Pattyn, Sylvain	France

Legend:
- (I) Inactive
- (S) Suspended
- (L) On loan
- (2W) Two-way player
- Substitute
- (injured) Injury / Illness

== Tournament results ==
Awards and achievements
Preceded by Inaugural	League of Legends World Championship winner 2011	Succeeded by Taipei Assassins
Preceded by Inaugural; Alliance; G2 Esports	League of Legends European Championship winner Spring 2013 – Spring 2014; Spring 2015 – Summer 2015; Spring 2018 – Summer 2018	Succeeded by Alliance; G2 Esports; G2 Esports
Preceded by Inaugural; Team LDLC.com	Counter-Strike: Global Offensive Major winner DreamHack Winter 2013; ESL One Cologne 2015 – ESL One Katowice 2015	Succeeded by Virtus.pro; Team EnVyUs
Preceded by AP Bren	MLBB World Championship winner (As Fnatic ONIC Philippines); 2024	Succeeded by Aurora Gaming
