= League of Legends: Season 1 World Championship =

2011 esports tournament

Season 1 Championship
- 2011

Tournament information
- Sport: League of Legends
- Location: Jönköping, Sweden
- Dates: June 18–20, 2011
- Administrator: Riot Games
- Host: DreamHack
- Venue: Elmia
- Teams: 8
- Purse: US$100,000

Final positions
- Champion: Fnatic
- Runner-up: Against All Authority

Tournament statistics
- Matches played: 21
- MVP: Maciej "Shushei" Ratuszniak

The League of Legends: Season 1 World Championship was an esports tournament for the multiplayer online battle arena video game League of Legends, held from June 18 to 20, 2011, in Jönköping, Sweden. It was the first iteration of the League of Legends World Championship, an annual international tournament organized by the game's developer, Riot Games. The tournament was won by Fnatic, who defeated Against All Authority 2–1 in the final.

== Background ==
League of Legends released in 2009, and after two years, it had built a strong community of players around its free-to-play model. However, the game lacked a full competitive experience until the introduction of ranked play and draft mode in mid-2010. Initially, only a handful of people at Riot believed in the future of competitive play, but as data suggested a growing viewership, the company decided to test the competitive landscape, organizing the first World Championship tournament in 2011, hosted by DreamHack in Jönköping, Sweden. Players brought their own computers, networked them together, and competed in front of fans.

== Teams ==
Eight teams qualified for the World Championship: three from North America, three from Europe, one from Singapore, and one from the Philippines.

Region	Team
Europe	Against All Authority
Europe	Gamed!de
Europe	Fnatic
North America	Team SoloMid
North America	Epik Gaming
North America	Counter Logic Gaming
Singapore	Xan
Philippines	Team Pacific

== Venues ==
Jönköping was selected as the host city for the World Championship.

Sweden
Jönköping
Elmia Exhibition and Convention Centre
Capacity: 2,000
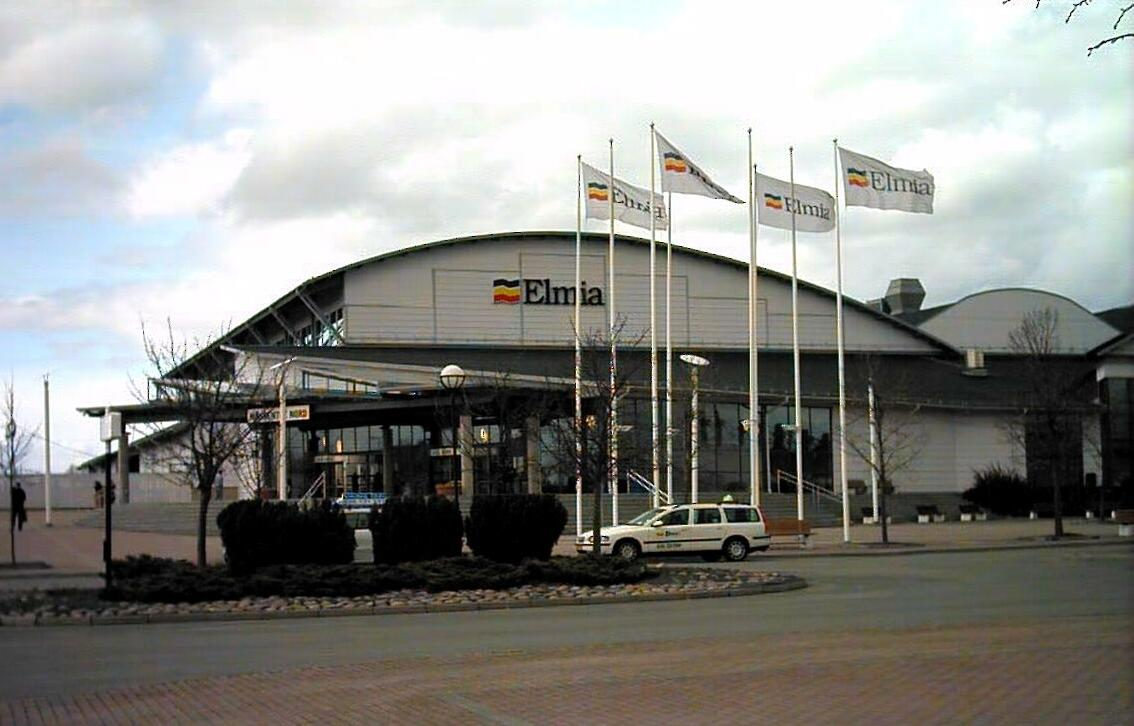

== Group stage ==
Group A

Pos	Team	Pld	W	L	PCT	Qualification
1	Epik Gaming	3	3	0	1.000	Advance to knockout stage
2	Against All Authority	3	2	1	0.667	Advance to relegation matches
3	Fnatic	3	1	2	0.333	Advance to relegation matches
4	Team Pacific	3	0	3	0.000	

Source: League of Legends (Archived 2013-01-11 at the Wayback Machine)

Group B

Pos	Team	Pld	W	L	PCT	Qualification
1	Team SoloMid	3	2	1	0.667	Advance to knockout stage
2	Counter Logic Gaming	3	2	1	0.667	Advance to relegation matches
3	Gamed!de	3	1	2	0.333	Advance to relegation matches
4	Xan	3	1	2	0.333	

Source: League of Legends (Archived 2013-01-11 at the Wayback Machine)

Relegation matches

Finals
Against All Authority	2
Gamed!de	0
Counter Logic Gaming	1
Fnatic	2
Fifth place
Gamed!de	0
Counter Logic Gaming	1

Advance to knockouts
Against All Authority
Fnatic

Source: League of Legends (Archived 2013-01-11 at the Wayback Machine)

== Knockout stage ==
Upper semifinals
Team SoloMid	1
Against All Authority	2
Epik Gaming	0
Fnatic	2
Lower semifinal
Team SoloMid	2
Epik Gaming	0

Upper final
Against All Authority	0
Fnatic	2
Lower final
Against All Authority	2
Team SoloMid	0

Final
Fnatic	2
Against All Authority	1

Source: League of Legends (Archived 2013-01-11 at the Wayback Machine)

== Final standings ==
Place	Team	Prize money
1	Fnatic	$50,000
2	Against All Authority	$25,000
3	Team SoloMid	$10,000
4	Epik Gaming	$7,000
5	Counter Logic Gaming	$3,500
6	Gamed!de	$2,000
7–8	Team Pacific	$1,000
7–8	Xan	$1,000

== Broadcast and viewership ==
The Season One World Championship accumulated over 1.6 million viewers and peaked at 210,000 concurrent viewers.
