= League of Legends World Championship =

Esports tournament

- Most recent season or competition: 2026 League of Legends World Championship
- Game: League of Legends
- Founded: 2011; 15 years ago
- Administrator: Riot Games
- No. of teams: 19 teams (2026)
- Most recent champion: Bilibili Gaming (2026)
- Most titles: T1 (6 titles)
- Qualification: Regional leagues (list)
- Streaming partners: Twitch, YouTube
- Related competitions: Mid-Season Invitational; First Stand Tournament
- Tournament format: Play-in stage; GSL-style double-elimination bracket; Main event; Swiss-system format; Single-elimination
- Website: lolesports.com

The League of Legends World Championship (commonly abbreviated as Worlds) is the annual professional League of Legends world championship tournament hosted by Riot Games and is the culmination of each season. Teams compete for the champion title, the 22-pound (10-kilogram) Summoner's Cup, and a multi-million-dollar championship prize. In 2018, the final was watched by 99.6 million people, breaking 2017's final's viewer record. The tournament has been praised for its ceremonial performances, while receiving attention worldwide due to its dramatic and emotional nature.

The League of Legends World Championship has gained success and popularity, making it among the world's most watched tournaments, as well as the most watched esports event in the world.

The tournament rotates its venues across different major countries and regions each year, with the next edition set to take place in Japan and South Korea in 2027. South Korea's T1 is the most successful team in the tournament's history, having won six world championships.

== Tournament format ==
Since the 2023 edition, the tournament features three stages: play-in stage, Swiss stage, and knockout stage. Depending on the number of teams competing, the play-in stage format may differ. For the 2026 edition, the play-in stage consists of four teams in a GSL-style double elimination bracket, with the winner advancing to the Swiss stage.

16 teams form the swiss stage, where a draw is held every round to determine every team's opponents. For the first round, no teams from the same region can face each other, but may do so in succeeding rounds; teams may not also face each other twice. The eight teams that achieve three wins advance to the knockout stage, while those that incur three losses are eliminated. All matches in the first two rounds and amongst teams with a 1–1 record in the third round are best-of-ones, while advancement and elimination series are best-of-three.

The knockout stage is a single-elimination bracket, comprising the quarterfinals, semifinals, and finals. A draw is held for the quarterfinals, where teams that finish with an undefeated Swiss stage record are put up against teams with a 3–2 record; other teams are drawn randomly.

== History ==
=== Season 1 (2011) ===
The Season 1 Championship was held in June 2011 at Dreamhack Summer 2011, and featured a US$100,000 tournament prize pool. 8 teams from Europe, North America, Southeast Asia (Note: The qualifier was available only for Philippines and Singapore. Each country was given a spot.) participated in the championship. Over 1.6 million viewers watched the streaming broadcast of the event, with a peak of over 210,069 simultaneous viewers in the final. Maciej "Shushei" Ratuszniak of the winning team Fnatic was named the most valuable player (MVP) of the tournament.

=== Season 2 (2012) ===
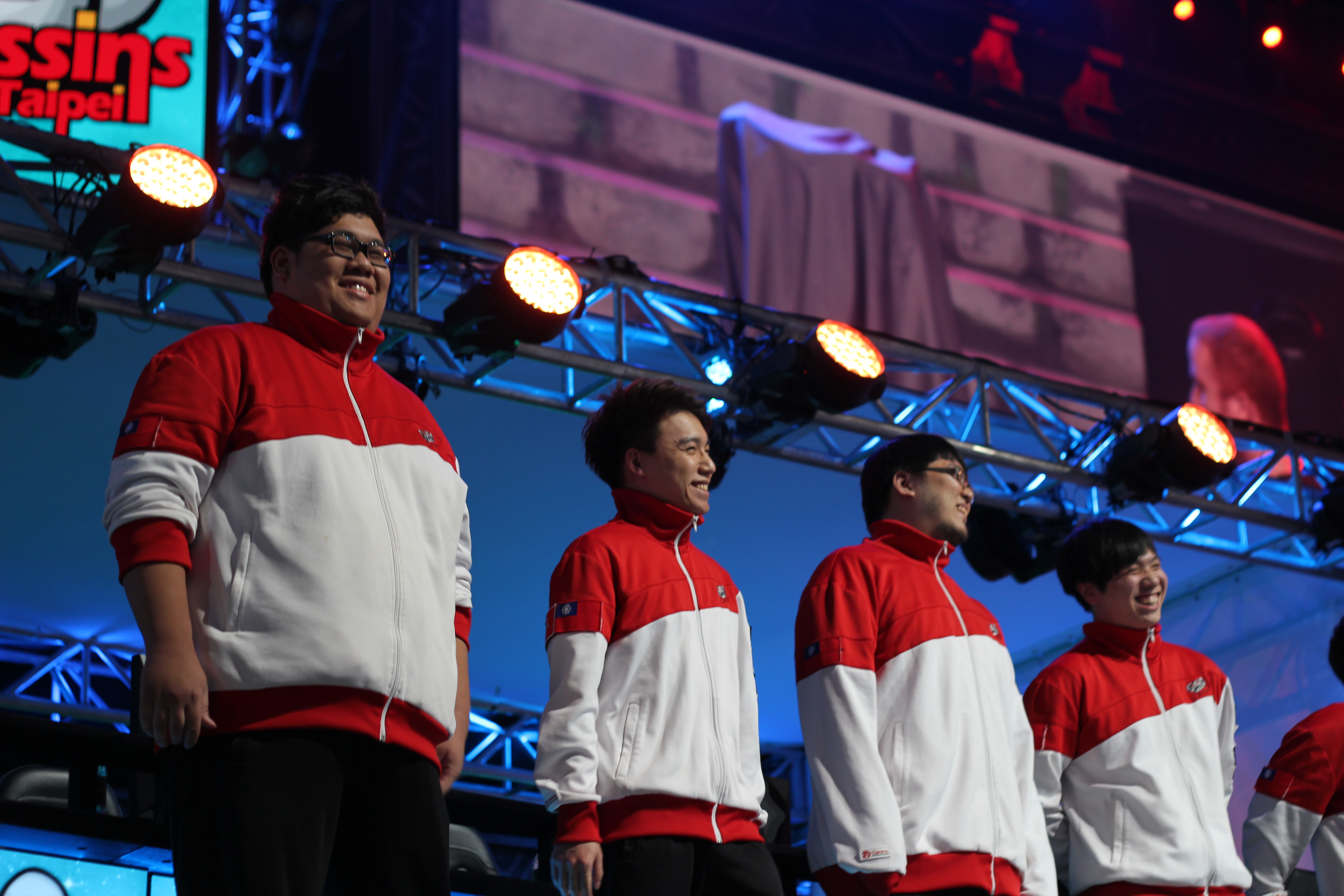
A group picture of the Taipei Assassins, the champions of season 2.

After Season 1, Riot announced that US$5,000,000 would be paid out over Season 2. Of this $5 million, $2 million went to Riot's partners including the IGN Pro League and other major esports associations. Another $2 million went to Riot's Season 2 qualifiers and championship. The final $1 million went to other organizers who applied to Riot to host independent League of Legends tournaments.

The Season 2 World Championship was held in early October 2012 in Los Angeles, California to conclude the US$5 million season. Twelve qualifying teams from around the world participated in the championship, which boasted the largest prize pool in the history of esports tournaments at the time at US$2 million, with US$1 million going to the champions. The group stage, quarterfinal, and semifinal matches took place between 4 and 6 October. The grand final took place a week after, on 13 October in the University of Southern California's Galen Center in front of 10,000 fans, and were broadcast in 13 different languages. In the grand final, Taiwan's professional team Taipei Assassins triumphed over South Korea's Azubu Frost 3 to 1 and claimed the US$1 million in prize money.

Over 8 million viewers tuned in to the Season 2 World Championship broadcast, with a maximum of 1.1 million concurrent viewers during the grand finale, making the Season 2 World Championship the most watched esports event in history at the time.

=== Season 3 (2013) ===
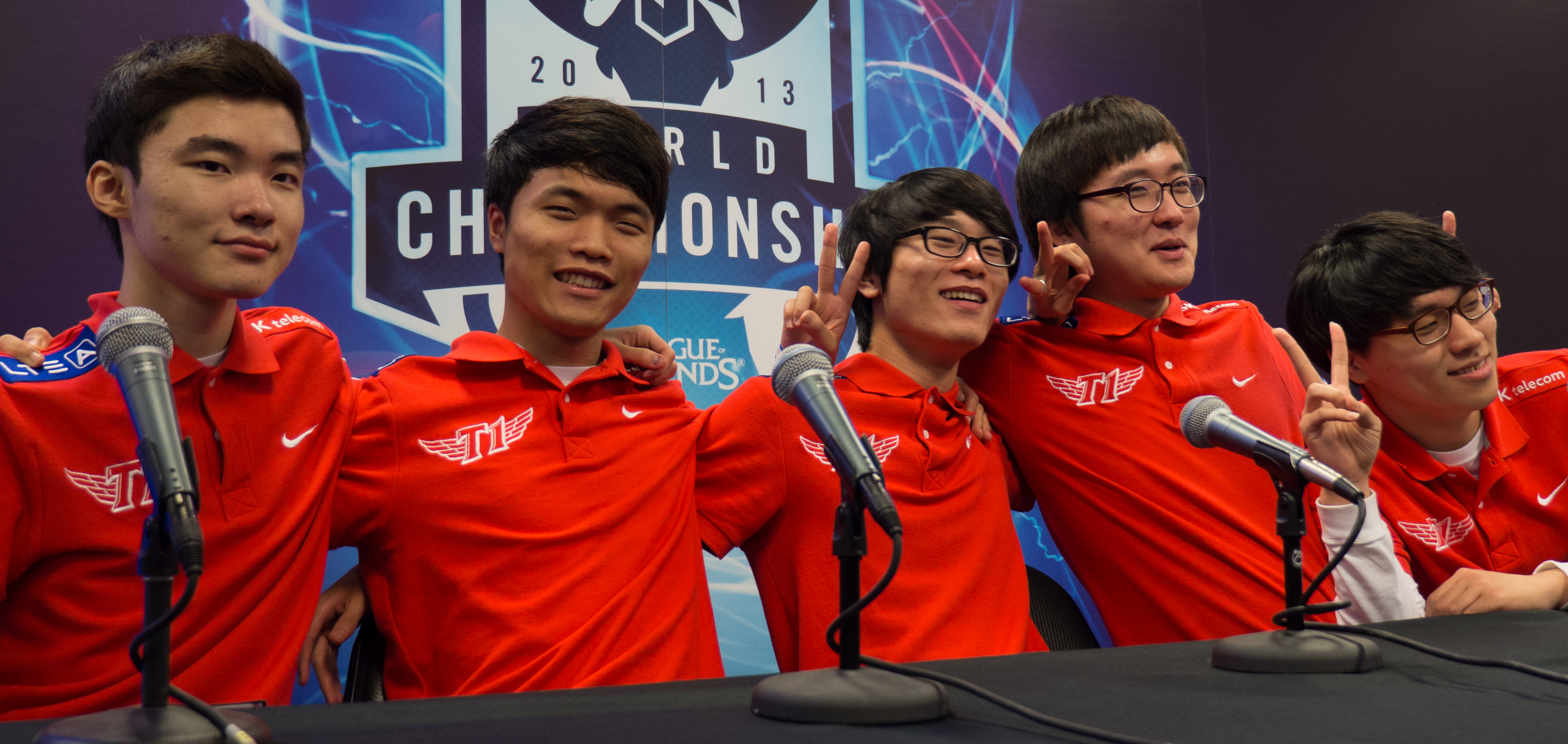
A group picture of SK Telecom T1, the champions of season 3.

The Season 3 World Championship was held in late 2013 in Los Angeles, California. 14 teams from North America, Korea, China, Southeast Asia, Europe, and one of the emerging League of Legends territories measured up at the World Playoffs after having qualified through their regional competitions. The grand final was held in the Staples Center on 4 October 2013, where Korean team SK Telecom T1 defeated the Chinese team Royal Club, granting them the title of the Season 3 world champions, the Summoner's Cup and the $1 million prize.

The Season 3 World Championship grand final broadcast on 4 October was watched by 32 million people with a peak concurrent viewership of 8.5 million. The numbers once again beat the previous records for esports viewership.

=== 2014 ===
The 2014 World Championship featured 16 teams competing for a $2.13 million prize pool, with 14 teams qualifying from the primary League of Legends regions (China, Europe, North America, Korea and Taiwan/SEA) and two international wildcard teams. Riot stopped numbering seasons and instead simply used the year for the 2014 and future championships.

The group stage began on 18 September in Taipei and concluded on 28 September in Singapore with eight teams advancing to the bracket stage. The bracket stage started on 3 October in Busan, South Korea, and concluded on 19 October with the grand final hosted at the 45,000-seats Seoul World Cup Stadium, where South Korean team Samsung Galaxy White beat the Chinese team Star Horn Royal Club to become the 2014 League of Legends world champions. Support player Cho "Mata" Se-hyeong was named the tournament most valuable player (MVP).

American band Imagine Dragons contributed the theme song "Warriors" for the tournament, and performed live on the grand final stage in South Korea. All games were made available for free via live streaming.

The 2014 World Championship games were streamed live by 40 broadcast partners and cast in 19 languages. The grand final was watched by 27 million people, with concurrent viewership peaking at over 11 million viewers.

=== 2015 ===
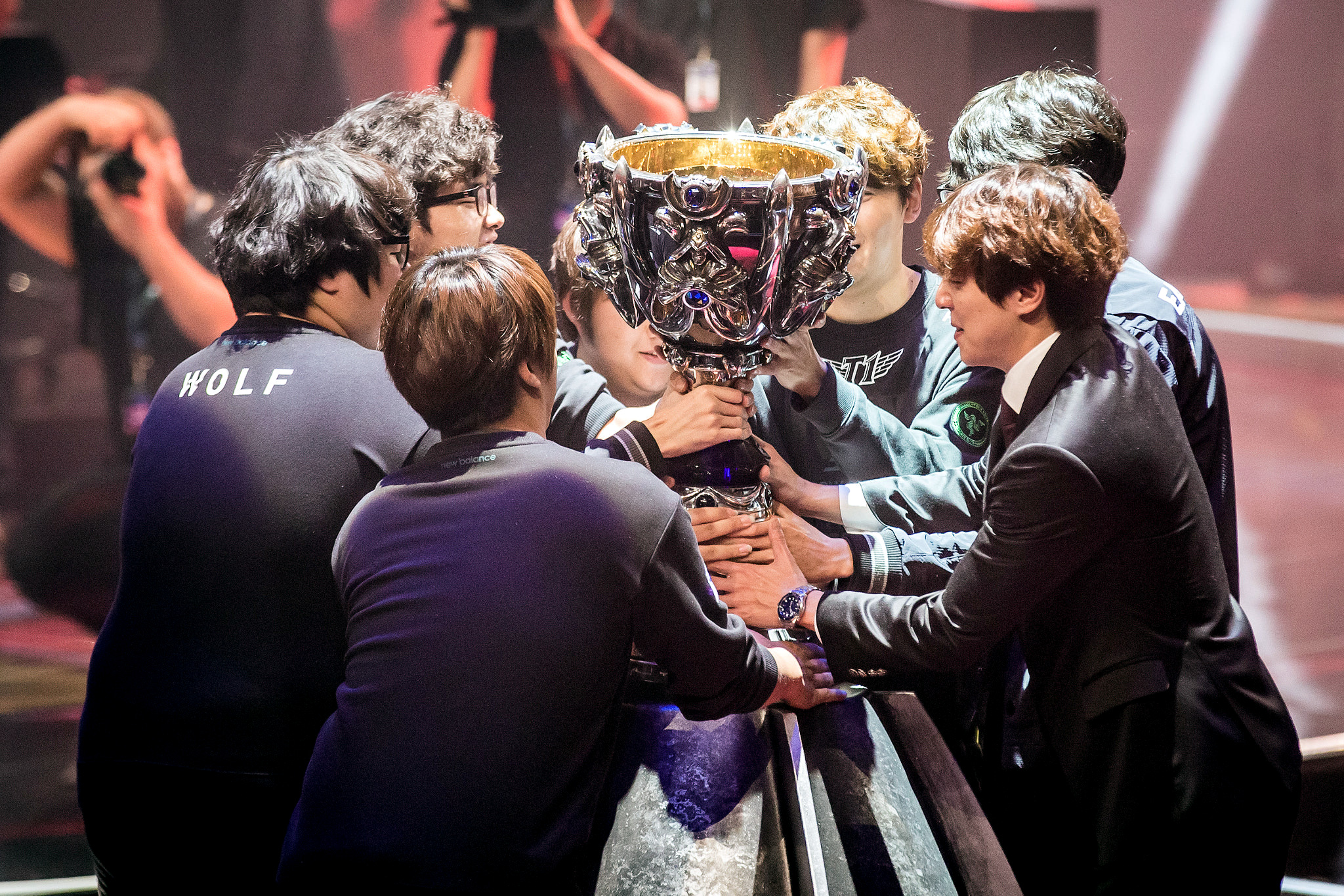
SK Telecom T1 celebrating after winning the 2015 World Championship.

After the 2014 season, Riot Games introduced a number of changes to competitive League of Legends. The number of teams in the League Championship Series was increased from 8 to 10 in both the North America and Europe regions. A second Riot Games official international tournament was announced, the Mid-Season Invitational, which took place in May 2015, and featured a single team from each major region and one international wildcard. Additionally, starting from 2015, all teams are required to field a head coach in their competitive matches, who will stay on stage and speak with the team via voice-chat in the pick–ban phase of the game. This change makes the head coach an officially recognized member of the team.

The 2015 World Championship concluded the 2015 season and was held at several venues across Europe in October 2015. Like the 2014 World Championship, the 2015 World Championship was a multi-city, multi-country event. 2015 Worlds was won by SK Telecom T1, their second title, as they won the 2013 Worlds too. SKT top laner Jang "MaRin" Gyeong-hwan was named the tournament most valuable player (MVP). The final was watched by 36 million people, with a peak concurrent viewership of 14 million viewers.

=== 2016 ===
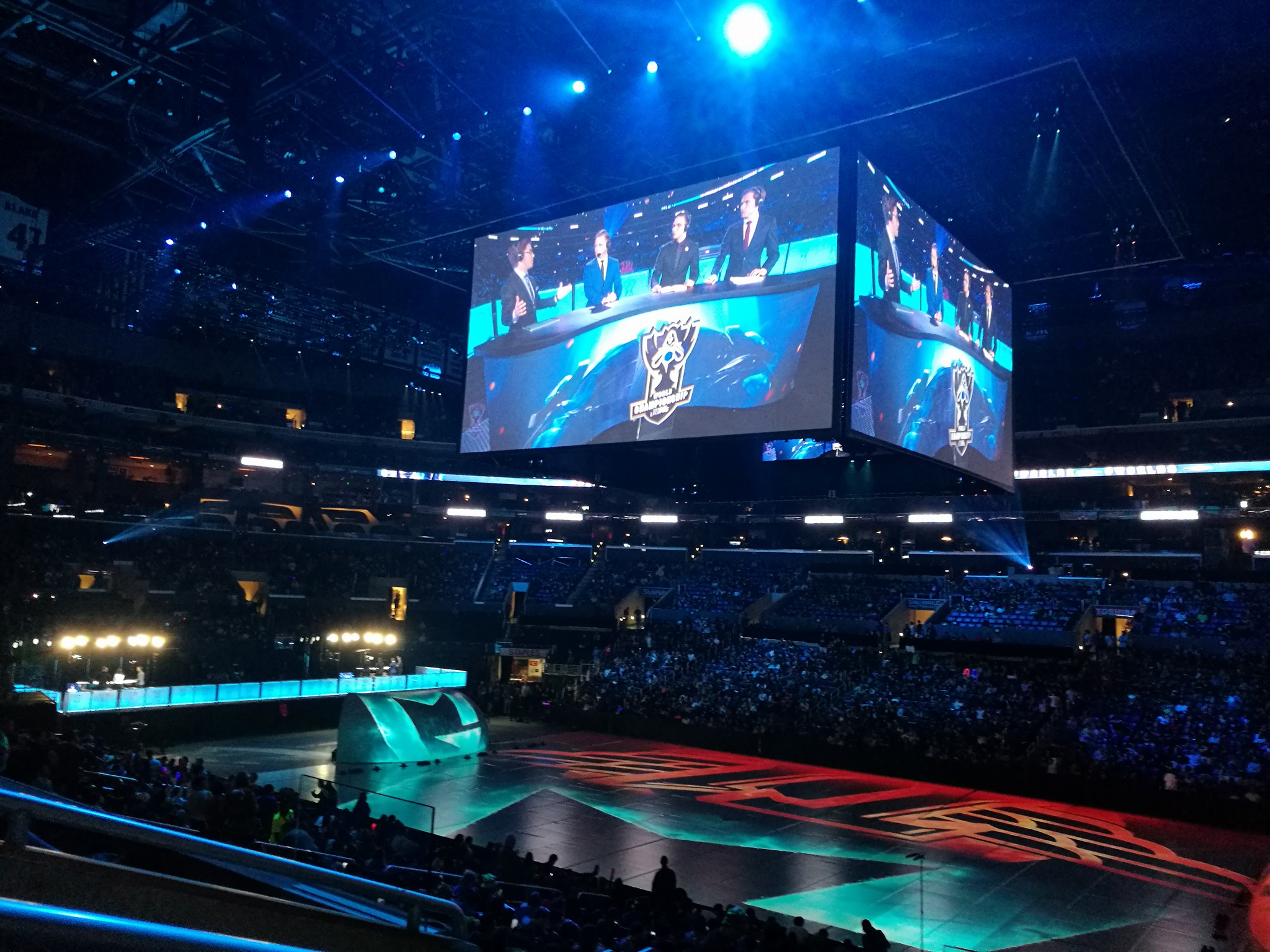
The Staples Center in Los Angeles as used for the 2016 League of Legends World Championship final

The various stages of the 2016 Worlds were held throughout the United States in Chicago, San Francisco, New York City, and the final in Los Angeles.

The groups of teams were decided through a live group draw show on 10 September. The games were played on the 6.18 patch of the game with Yorick disabled, and Aurelion Sol disabled for days 1–3. There were 16 teams and 4 groups that consisted of 4 teams. The group stage was Bo1 and the top two teams from each group would advance to the Knockout Stage. The Knockout Stage was Bo5 and the #1 vs #2 teams from each group would face each other in the bracket. The total prize pool was US$5,070,000 and it was spread among the teams. The first place (SK Telecom T1) took $2,028,000, the second team (Samsung Galaxy) took $760,500, and the third and fourth place (ROX Tigers and H2K) took $380,250 divided among the 2 teams. The rest of the prize pool was distributed among the 5th–16th places.

SKT won 3–2 versus Samsung Galaxy in the 2016 World Championship final, with Faker winning the MVP award. The final was watched by 43 million people, with a peak concurrent viewership of 14.7 million viewers, breaking 2015's final's viewer records.

=== 2017 ===
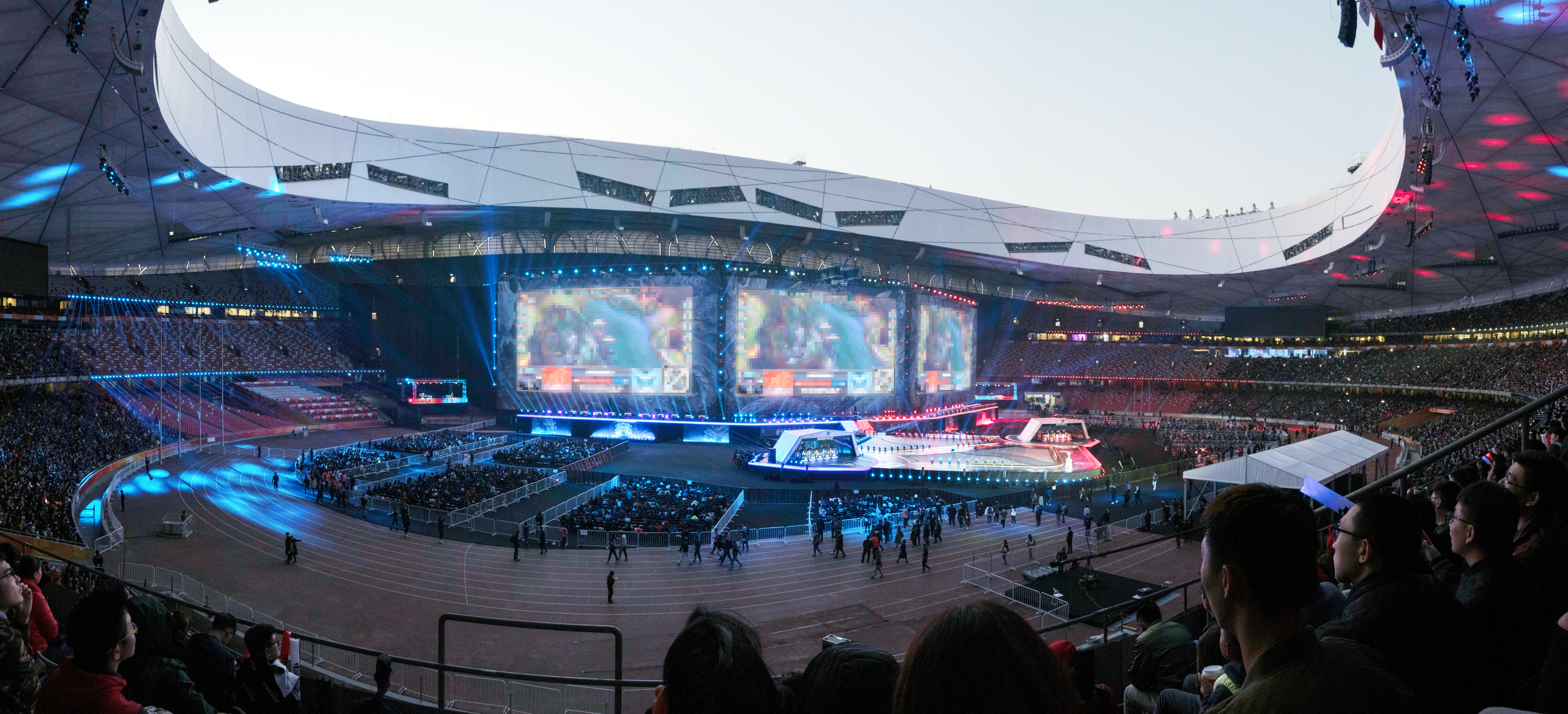
The stage for the 2017 League of Legends World Championship final between SK Telecom T1 and Samsung Galaxy in the Beijing National Stadium

The 2017 World Championship series started in September 2017, and concluded in November 2017. It was held in 4 different locations throughout China: Wuhan (play-in and groups), Guangzhou (quarterfinals), Shanghai (semifinals), and Beijing (final). It was played on patch 7.18, with the newest champion Ornn being disabled. Patch 7.18 is slightly older than patches 7.19 and 7.20, which are the new standard for online matches during the September - November period. The most notable difference being the stronger Ardent Censer support meta with patch 7.18.

A total of 24 teams participated in the tournament: 3 teams from South Korea, China, North America, Europe and Taiwan/Hong Kong/Macau; 1 team from Brazil, Latin America North, Latin America South, Japan, Oceania, Turkey, Southeast Asia and CIS/Russia; and 1 team from the Wildcard region with the highest rank finish at the 2017 Mid-Season Invitational (GPL in Southeast Asia, due to Gigabyte Marines from Vietnam prevailing there, and Vietnam received 1 more slot for VCS's second seed to participate GPL 2017 summer split).

Samsung Galaxy reversed the previous year's result and defeated SK Telecom T1 3–0 in the 2017 World Championship final. Park "Ruler" Jae-hyuk, the AD carry of Samsung, was named MVP. The final was watched by 60 million people, breaking 2016's final's viewer records. The tournament is widely praised for its high quality of plays and amazing ceremonial performances, while receiving worldwide attention for its dramatic and emotional series. It is currently the most watched tournament in League of Legends' history and is lauded as one of the best.

=== 2018 ===
The 2018 World Championship was held from 1 October to 3 November, 2018, in 4 cities across South Korea: Seoul (play-in), Busan (groups & quarterfinals), Gwangju (semifinals), and Incheon (final). Twenty four teams qualified for the tournament based on their placement in regional circuits such as those in North America, Europe, South Korea, and China, with twelve of those teams having to reach the group stage via a play-in round.

The 2018 World Championship was played on Patch 8.19. Notably, champions Aatrox, Alistar and Urgot were extremely prevalent in the tournament, with the three characters being picked or banned in over 90 percent of the 78 games played. The World Championship final was played between Invictus Gaming and Fnatic. Invictus Gaming won 3–0 against Fnatic, granting China and the LPL their first World Championship. Gao "Ning" Zhenning was named the MVP of the series in their victory. The final was watched by 99.6 million unique viewers, with concurrent viewership reaching a peak of 44 million viewers, breaking 2017's final's viewership record.

Notably, Riot debuted their virtual K-pop group named K/DA during the ceremony, with Soyeon and Miyeon from (G)I-dle, Madison Beer and Jaira Burns representing the group as its human counterpart and in the live performance of the finals. K/DA topped global music charts after the initial release of their debut song "Pop/Stars", receiving considerable attention online and raking in one of the fastest viewership records for its music video on YouTube.

=== 2019 ===
The 2019 World Championship was held between 2 October to 10 November 2019, in three countries and cities in Europe: Berlin (play-in & groups), Madrid (quarterfinals and semifinals), and Paris (final). Twenty-four teams qualified to participate at the World Championship based on placement within their own regional leagues and previous regional results in international play.

The 2019 World Championship was played on Patch 9.19 from start to finish. The World Championship final was played on 10 November 2019 between LPL's FunPlus Phoenix and LEC's G2 Esports at AccorHotels Arena in Paris. FunPlus Phoenix won 3–0 against G2 Esports, granting China and the LPL back-to-back World Championships. Gao "Tian" Tianliang was named the MVP of the series in their victory. The final was watched by more than 100 million viewers, peaking at 44 million concurrent views.

=== 2020 ===
The 2020 World Championship was held from 25 September to 31 October 2020 in Shanghai, China. 22 teams qualified to participate at the World Championship based on placement within their own regional leagues and previous regional results in international play. As a result of travel restrictions related to the COVID-19 pandemic, the two teams that qualified from the Vietnam Championship Series were unable to attend the event.

All games leading up to the final were hosted in the Shanghai Media Tech Studio with no fans in attendance. The final was hosted in the Pudong Football Stadium as the building's inaugural event, hosting a limited number of 6,312 fans due to the COVID-19 pandemic. The final was played on 31 October 2020 between Suning, from China's League of Legends Pro League, and Damwon Gaming, from League of Legends Champions Korea, with Damwon Gaming winning the championship 3–1. During the second game, Suning's top laner Chen "Bin" Zebin achieved the first "Pentakill" in the final of a World Championship. Damwon Gaming's jungler, Kim "Canyon" Geon-bu, was named the MVP of the series. Damwon's win ended the LPL's back-to-back streak of world championship victories. The final was watched at its peak by 46.07 million viewers.

=== 2021 ===
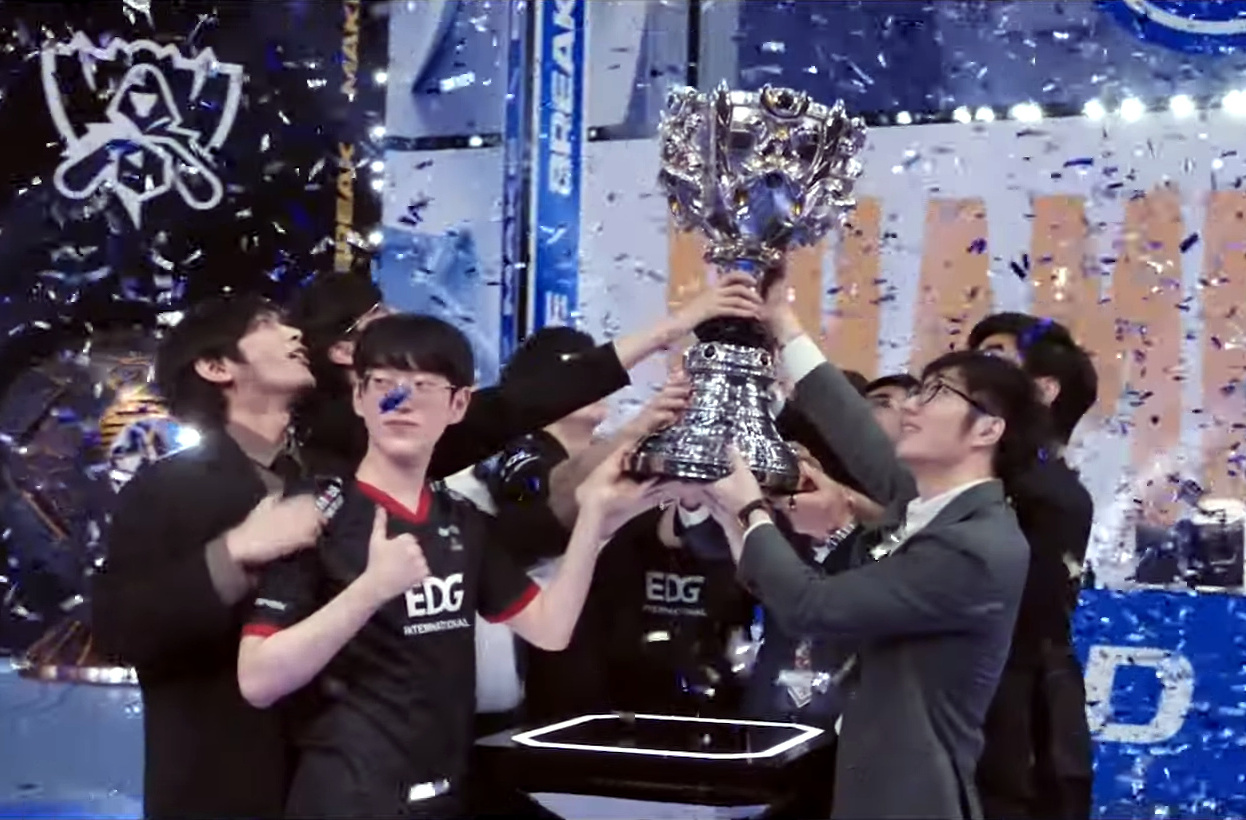
EDG won the 2021 World Championship

The 2021 World Championship was held from 5 October to 6 November 2021 in Reykjavík, Iceland. In line with last year's iteration, 22 teams qualified to participate at the World Championship based on placement within their own regional leagues and previous regional results in international play. As a result of travel restrictions related to the COVID-19 pandemic, the two teams that qualified from the Vietnam Championship Series were once again unable to attend the event.

All games of the tournament were hosted in the Laugardalshöll, with no fans in attendance due to the COVID-19 pandemic in Iceland. The final was played on 6 November 2021 between Edward Gaming, from China's League of Legends Pro League, and defending champions DWG KIA (formerly Damwon Gaming), from League of Legends Champions Korea, with Edward Gaming winning the championship 3–2, ending DWG KIA's chance to win back-to-back world championships. Edward Gaming's mid laner, Lee "Scout" Ye-chan, was named the MVP of the series. The final had an average audience of 30.6 million, peaking at 73.86 million concurrent viewers.

=== 2022 ===
The 2022 World Championship was held from 29 September to 5 November, 2022, with the event taking place in 4 cities across North America: Mexico City (play-in), New York City (groups & quarterfinals), Atlanta (semifinals) and San Francisco (finals). Twenty-four teams qualified to participate at the World Championship based on placement within their own regional leagues and previous regional results in international play. As a result of the Russian invasion of Ukraine, the League of Legends Continental League from the CIS region was unable to send a representative to participate in the event.

The finals was played at the Chase Center on 5 November 2022 between T1 and DRX, both from the League of Legends Champions Korea (LCK). Riot Games collaborated with Lil Nas X to release "Star Walkin'" for the finals. In the final, DRX defeated T1 3–2 in a close series, becoming the first team to win the championship after starting from the play-in stage. DRX's top laner, Hwang "Kingen" Seong-hoon, was named the MVP of the series. Their victory was considered a Cinderella and underdog success story, as they had come from the play-in stage as Korea's fourth seed representative, and had beaten some of the more favored and accomplished teams along the way, including the previous worlds champions Edward Gaming in a 3–2 reverse sweep in the quarterfinals, and defeating the LCK Summer Split champions Gen.G 3–1 in the semifinals.

=== 2023 ===
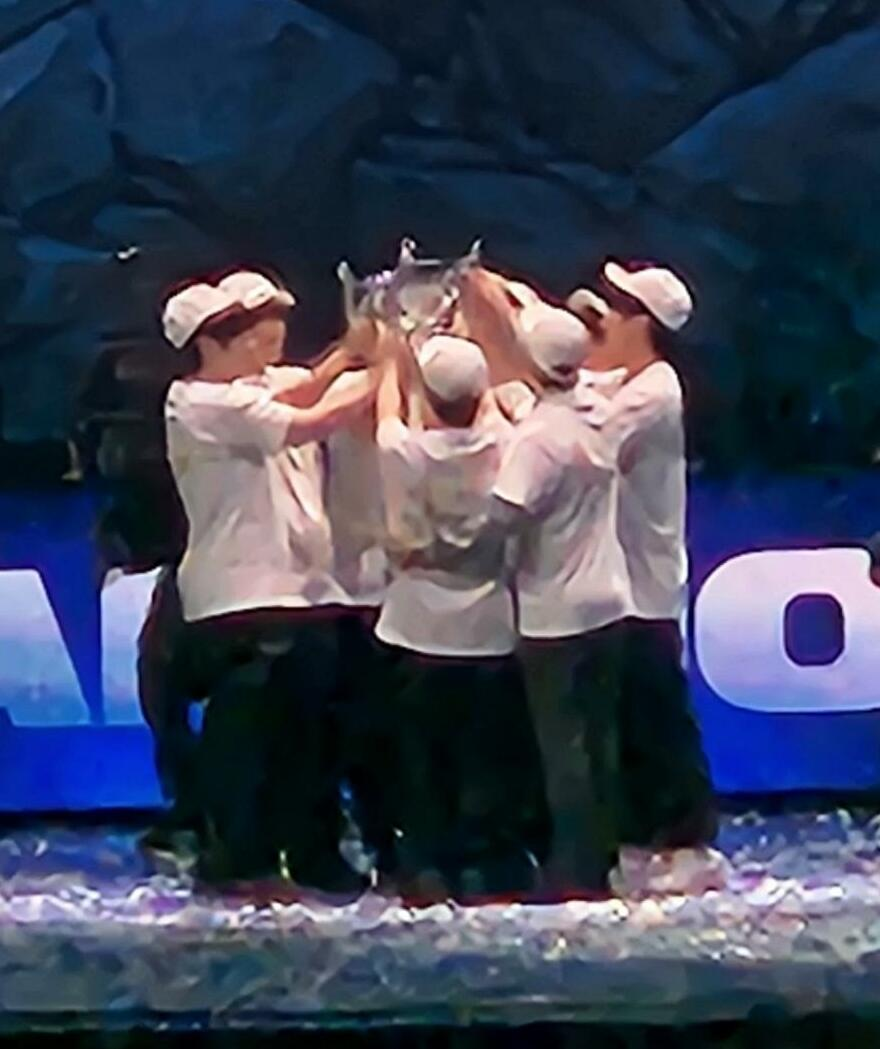
T1 won its fourth World Championship on home soil in 2023.

The 2023 World Championship was held from 10 October to 19 November 2023, with the event taking place in two cities across South Korea: Seoul and Busan. Twenty-two teams qualified to participate at the World Championship based on placement within their own regional leagues and previous regional results in international play. Albeit, one team qualified for the event through the newly inaugurated Worlds Qualifying Series between the fourth-seeded teams from the LEC and LCS.

The format for the event differed to the previous editions, with the introduction of a play-in stage, consisting of eight teams who are split into two double elimination brackets. There, three teams qualified to the second stage of the event where the qualifying teams, along with thirteen other teams, faced off in a swiss-system tournament to determine the qualifiers to the knockout stage, with the eventual champions being crowned at the conclusion of the single-elimination knockout stage.

The finals were played at the Gocheok Sky Dome on 19 November 2023 between Weibo Gaming from the League of Legends Pro League (LPL), and previous years' finalist T1 from the League of Legends Champions Korea (LCK). In the final, T1 defeated Weibo Gaming 3–0, extending their record for the most world championships won by single team with four titles. T1's top laner, Choi "Zeus" Woo-je, was named the MVP of the series, while teammate Faker became the first player to win four World Championships.

=== 2024 ===
The 2024 World Championship was held from 25 September to 2 November 2024, with the event taking place in three cities across Europe: Berlin, Paris and London. Twenty-two teams qualified to participate at the World Championship based on placement within their own regional leagues and results gained in this years' Mid-Season Invitational (MSI), with the LCK and LPL's 4th seeds in the Swiss stage reallocated to the winner and a team from the best performing region of the event. (Note: The winner of MSI will qualify for Worlds provided they reach the Summer split playoffs, while the best performing region left will gain an additional spot at Worlds.)

During the finals' broadcast of the 2023 World Championship, Riot Games announced that the finals of the 2024 edition of Worlds would take place in London at The O2 Arena on 2 November 2024.

In the final, T1 defeated Bilibili Gaming 3–2, extending their record for most world championships won by a single team, with Faker becoming the first player to win five World Championships, alongside the first to win 2 Finals MVPs.

=== 2025 ===
Alongside news of Riot Games' extended sponsorship agreement with smartphone manufacturer Oppo, it was announced during the media day for the 2024 World Championship final that China would host the 2025 League of Legends World Championship. It was the country's third hosting of the tournament and the first since 2017 to take place in China without travel restrictions as the 2020 edition was held in an "isolation bubble" due to the COVID-19 pandemic in mainland China. It was later announced that the final would be held in Chengdu, with Beijing hosting both play-ins and swiss stages, and Shanghai hosting the quarterfinals and semifinals.

This edition of the tournament featured 17 teams in total, with the MSI slots being kept and three teams from each of League's new competitive regions during the 2025 competitive season (Americas, (Note: The LTA was discontinued in September 2025, as the LCS (North America) and CBLOL (Brazil) returned in 2026.) EMEA, Korea, China and Asia-Pacific) qualifying on top. One best-of-5 play-in match was held before the Swiss stage between two teams.

It was also the first World Championship to adopt the Fearless Draft format, where champions that have been played by either team become unavailable for both teams for the remainder of the series. While Fearless Draft was intended to only be used during the first split of the season, Riot Games announced prior to the final of the 2025 First Stand Tournament that it would apply for the rest of the year, including MSI and Worlds, after it received "overwhelming" positive feedback during that period. Fearless Draft was used for all best-of-3 and best-of-5 series during the World Championship.

In the 2025 final, T1 successfully defended their title with a 3–2 victory over KT Rolster, securing their record-extending sixth world championship and becoming the first team ever to win the title for three consecutive years. Gumayusi was crowned Finals MVP.

=== 2026 ===
Riot Games announced In January 2025 that the 2026 World Championship will be held in North America, marking the first time since 2022 that the event will be held in the North American region. It was revealed in November 2025 that Allen, Texas in the United States is scheduled to host the swiss stage, quarterfinals, and semifinals, whilst the final is scheduled to take place in New York City, where the city had previously hosted the semifinals and quarterfinals of the 2016 and 2022 editions, respectively. Los Angeles was added to the list of host cities on 22 March 2026 and will play host to the play-in stage.

The final was played at the Barclays Center on 14 November 2026 between Gen.G from the League of Legends Champions Korea (LCK), and Bilibili Gaming from the League of Legends Pro League (LPL). There, Bilibili Gaming won their first-ever World Championship with a 3–1 scoreline against Gen.G, marking the first time since 2021 that a team from China won the event.

=== 2027 ===
The 2027 World Championship will take place in Japan and South Korea. Nagoya will host the Swiss stage for Japan's first time hosting the World Championship, while the quarterfinals and semifinals will take place at the Suwon Convention Center in Suwon. Seoul will once again host the finals, set to take place at the brand new Seoul Arena.

== Trophy ==
Riot Games, which owns League of Legends, commissioned the winner's trophy as the Summoner's Cup. Riot specified that it should weigh 70 pounds (about 32 kilograms), though the actual weight of the finished cup was reduced so it would not be too heavy to lift in victory. The World Championship Cups for 2012 and for 2014 were created by Thomas Lyte.

In 2022, Riot Games announced the formation of a multi-year partnership with American jewelry brand Tiffany & Co., producing a newly designed Summoner's Cup with a weight of 44 pounds (about 20 kilograms). In 2025, the Summoner's Cup was redesigned again, more closely resembling the original design. The trophy's weight was also reduced in half to 22 pounds (about 10 kilograms) so it could be easier to lift by the winning team.

== List of World Championships ==
Year	Final						No.
Year	Location	Venue	Champion	Score		Runner-up	No.
2011	Jönköping, Sweden	Elmia	Fnatic	2	1	Against All Authority	8
2012	Los Angeles, U.S.	Galen Center	Taipei Assassins	3	1	Azubu Frost	12
2013	Los Angeles, U.S.	Staples Center	SK Telecom T1	3	0	Royal Club	14
2014	Seoul, South Korea	Seoul World Cup Stadium	Samsung White	3	1	Royal Club	16
2015	Berlin, Germany	Mercedes-Benz Arena	SK Telecom T1	3	1	KOO Tigers	16
2016	Los Angeles, U.S.	Staples Center	SK Telecom T1	3	2	Samsung Galaxy	16
2017	Beijing, China	Beijing National Stadium	Samsung Galaxy	3	0	SK Telecom T1	24
2018	Incheon, South Korea	Incheon Munhak Stadium	Invictus Gaming	3	0	Fnatic	24
2019	Paris, France	AccorHotels Arena	FunPlus Phoenix	3	0	G2 Esports	24
2020	Shanghai, China	Pudong Football Stadium	Damwon Gaming	3	1	Suning	22
2021	Reykjavík, Iceland	Laugardalshöll	Edward Gaming	3	2	DWG KIA	22
2022	San Francisco, U.S.	Chase Center	DRX	3	2	T1	24
2023	Seoul, South Korea	Gocheok Sky Dome	T1	3	0	Weibo Gaming	22
2024	London, England	The O2 Arena	T1	3	2	Bilibili Gaming	20
2025	Chengdu, China	Dong'an Lake Sports Park; Multifunctional Gymnasium	T1	3	2	KT Rolster	17
2026	New York City, U.S.	Barclays Center	Bilibili Gaming	3	1	Gen.G	19
2027	Seoul, South Korea	Seoul Arena					

=== Titles by region ===
Region	Titles	Runner-up	Total
South Korea (LCK)	10	8	18
China (LPL)	4	5	9
EMEA (LEC)	1	3	4
Asia-Pacific (LCP) (Note: In 2012, Taipei Assassins competed in the Garena Premier League (GPL), which included teams from Taiwan, Hong Kong, Macau and Southeast Asia, but the regional qualifiers for Worlds were split for each region.)	1	0	1

=== Titles by organization ===
* Indicates a team or organization has been disbanded, acquired or no longer participates in the regional league.

Team	League	Champions	Runners-up	Total
T1 (Note: SK Telecom T1 rebranded as T1 in late 2019.)	LCK	6	2	8
Gen.G (Note: The team was known as Samsung White when they won their first title in 2014, while the team played under the Samsung Galaxy name when they played in the World Championship in 2016 and subsequently won in 2017. They were acquired by KSV eSports in 2017 and later rebranded as Gen.G in the middle of 2018.)	LCK	2	2	4
Fnatic	LEC	1	1	2
Dplus KIA (Note: The team was previously known as Damwon Gaming (2020) and DWG KIA (2021–2022).)	LCK	1	1	2
Bilibili Gaming	LPL	1	1	2
Taipei Assassins	GPL	1	0	1
Invictus Gaming	LPL	1	0	1
FunPlus Phoenix (Note: Participated in League of Legends esports competitions until the 2025 season, when the LPL repurchased the team's slot in the league.)	LPL	1	0	1
Edward Gaming	LPL	1	0	1
Kiwoom DRX (Note: The team was previously known as DRX.)	LCK	1	0	1
