= Elmia =

Convention centre in Jönkoping, Sweden

Coordinates: 57.7889°N 14.2303°E

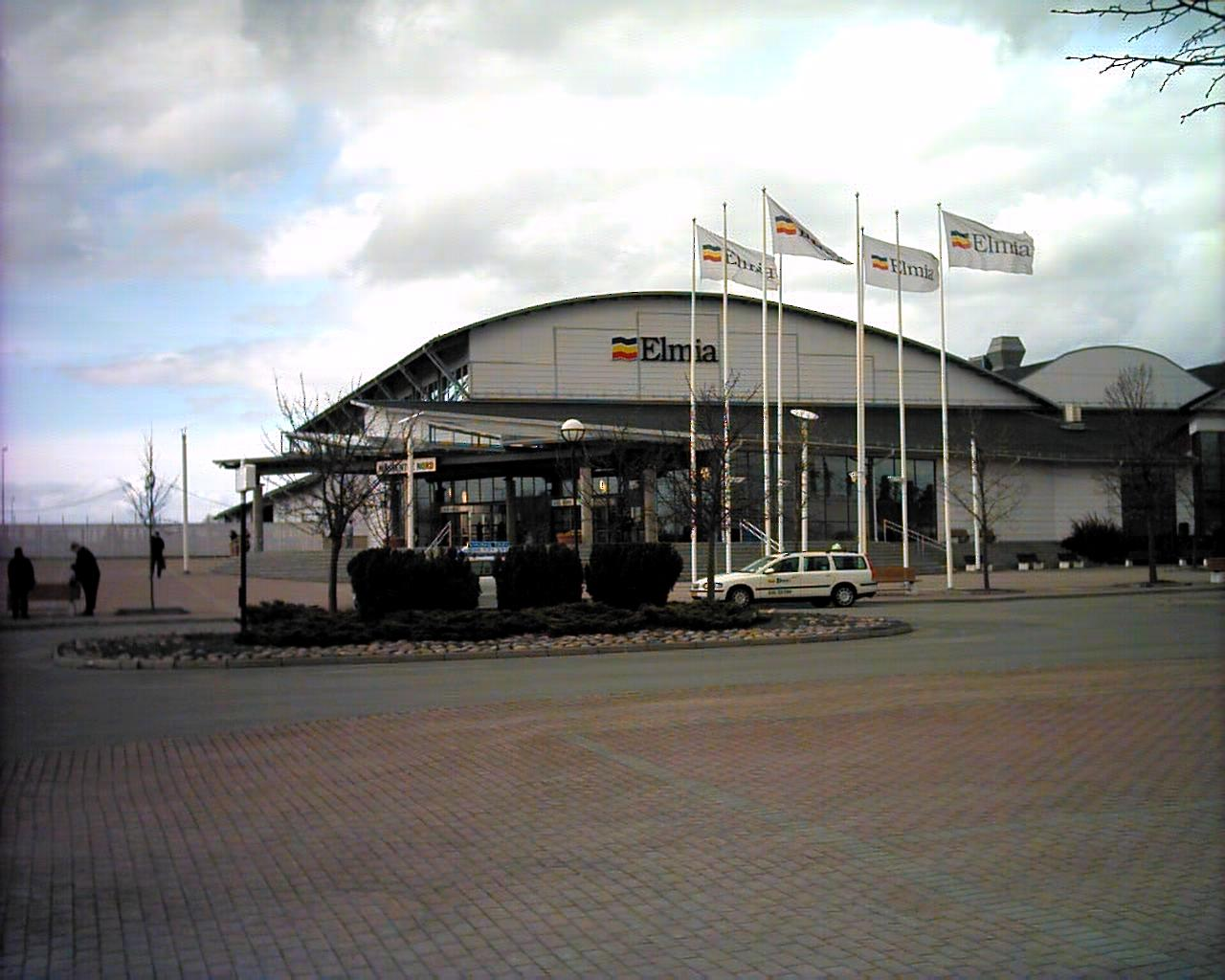
Elmia building, north entrance

Elmia Exhibition and Convention Centre is a trade fair in Jönköping, Sweden. The building was built in 1961 for agriculture trade fairs. Later it was expanded to also hold other trade fairs like boat and auto shows. The building has 34,000 square metres floor and is divided into 4 major halls and a few smaller ones.

One of the most popular activities at Elmia is Dreamhack, the biggest LAN party in the world, with over 21600 visitors and their computers. Dreamhack played host to the inaugural Counter-Strike Major in 2013, won by fnatic.

The outdoor game of the 2011–12 Elitserien season, between HV71 and Linköpings HC, was played in a temporary outdoor arena at Elmia.

Preceded by Inaugural (2013); Koelnmesse; ESL One Cologne 2014	Counter-Strike Major Playoffs host venue 2013-2014; Dreamhack Winter 2013 and Dreamhack Winter 2014	Succeeded by Spodek; EMS One Katowice 2014 and ESL One Katowice 2014
