= DreamHack =

Swedish production company

- Industry: Entertainment
- Founded: 1994; 32 years ago
- Founder: Kenny Eklund; Martin Öjes
- Headquarters: Hägersten, Stockholm, Sweden
- Products: Esports tournaments Gaming convention
- Parent: ESL Gaming
- Website: dreamhack.com

DreamHack is a Swedish ESL Gaming brand specializing in esports tournaments and other gaming conventions; at its root, a massive LAN party and computer festival, recognized by Guinness World Records and Twin Galaxies as being the world's largest with the world's fastest Internet connection and the most generated traffic. Initially a Swedish event, it today holds its events throughout Western Europe and North America etc.

== Events summary ==
DreamHack's events include local area network gatherings with live concerts and competitions in digital art and esports. The first event was held in Malung, Sweden. The company has held several gaming events throughout Europe, in Stockholm, Jönköping, Tours, Bucharest, Cluj, Valencia, Seville, London, and Leipzig. In May 2016, it held its first North American event in Austin, Texas. In August 2016, it held its first Canada event in Montreal, Quebec. Winter events consistently have about 10% more visitors than summer events.

Attendees range from elementary school students to senior citizens. The average age is 16–17.

The event has five major components:

Component	Description
Festival	Every seated participant gets a table (60 cm deep and 83 cm wide), a chair, a power socket and a LAN socket. Participants bring their own equipment of choice, usually a display or TV and a computer or console. Some bring their own office chairs to substitute the ones supplied. Since there is activity around the clock, participants can sleep in the adjacent sleeping halls, for which they bring their own sleeping equipment.
Gaming competitions	With a total prize pool of over 3 million SEK, the DreamHack esports competitions attract professional players from all over the world. About one hundred different video streams are broadcast over the Internet, mostly covering the esports competitions. 21 of them are produced by DreamHack crew, the rest are independent and include Swedish national TV
Digital arts competitions	In the DreamHack Kreativ competition participants compete in creating all things digital, including photographs, drawings, music, 3D-models, demos, games, animations and movies. Some participants spend the entire event producing creative works, such as a movie or piece of music. During final ceremony, all submissions are presented on the main stage.
Live concerts	Musical festivals are held every evening and night. This aspect of DreamHack has increased dramatically in popularity and is a major factor in the rise in sale of daypasses. The stage is set up with lasers, lights and professional video broadcasting equipment.
Expo	Many companies present their products in the expo area and it is common for big game development studios to allow visitors to play the games currently under development. There are also various seminars and lectures, as well as a shop selling computer equipment.
The Dreamies	A yearly award show introduced in 2020, where a jury gives awards to the best games, most compelling characters, best eSports teams, and content creators in multiple categories.

DreamHack events are arranged with the help of about 800 volunteers, set up in "Crew Teams", who work in shifts to provide around-the-clock services for visitors. A support crew has a helpdesk where participants can address technical problems. The festival also relies on local police and security officers who patrol the area.

== History ==
Computer screens illuminated at DreamHack Winter 2004

Dreamhack began as a small gathering of schoolmates and friends in the basement of an elementary school in Malung, Sweden, in the early 1990s. In 1994, it was moved to the school cafeteria and became one of the larger regional demo tech and gaming events at the time. This event was also the first to be called DreamHack.

In 1997, the event took place at Arena Kupolen in Borlänge and became the largest LAN party of Sweden and the third largest party in Scandinavia at the time. Furthermore, DreamHack 2001 and the subsequent events were held at the Elmia exhibition centre in Jönköping. It was held there until the last Dreamhack Jönköping (2023), both Winter and Summer, when, in 2024, it left Jönköping after 30 years in the city.

In 2002, DreamHack had events twice a year. Initially, DreamHack Summer in June was focused on computer games, and DreamHack Winter was more focused on computer program demos and was held during the last weekend of November. Today, the focus of summer and winter is same.

In 2011, DreamHack AB went through a corporate reform, renewing the company administration.

DreamHack winter 2011 hosted League of Legends season 1 World Championship. The next year's League of Legends World Championship was held independently.

It was announced on 15 November 2012, that DreamHack would be partnering with Major League Gaming (MLG) and Electronic Sports League (ESL) to help facilitate the growth and development of the North American and European esports scene. These partnerships included universal rankings, unified competition structures, and more.

In 2013, DreamHack AB grew into a corporation. Later they added a third event during the late summer in Stockholm. It was hosted at Globe Arenas in 2014.

In November 2015, Modern Times Group bought DreamHack for 244 million Swedish krona.

In response to the increasing visibility of older gamers, in June 2019 DreamHack hosted the first senior World Cup for Counter Strike.

In 2020, on the 30th of September, ESL announced that it had merged with DreamHack. The two companies are functioning as one, but the two brands are operated separately.

In 2024, Swedish powerlifter Ellen Åkesson starred in a billboard campaign in Stockholm for DreamHack.
