= 2026 League of Legends World Championship qualification =

Esports tournament qualification

Qualification for the 2026 League of Legends World Championship took place from August to October 2026, qualifying nineteen (19) teams for the final tournament. The six Tier 1 regional leagues are expected to have representation at the tournament.

As the winner of the 2026 Mid-Season Invitational (MSI), Hanwha Life Esports of the League of Legends Champions Korea (LCK) received an automatic slot in the tournament, provided it qualified for its league's playoffs; this was confirmed on 15 August 2026. By virtue of being the second-best-performing region at MSI, China's League of Legends Pro League (LPL) also earned an additional slot to the World Championship.

Outside of the berths from MSI, the League of Legends Champions Korea (LCK), League of Legends Championship Pacific (LCP), League Championship Series (LCS), League of Legends EMEA Championship (LEC), and the League of Legends Pro League (LPL) produced three (3) qualified teams each, while the Campeonato Brasileiro de League of Legends (CBLOL) qualified two (2) teams.

== Method ==
Nineteen teams participated in the World Championship, with each team sending a roster of five players. Teams may have an additional one to two players on their roster.

=== Qualification via Regional Leagues ===
Five regional leagues, namely the LCK, LCP, LCS, LEC, and LPL, distributed three (3) quotas each, while the CBLOL allocated two (2), making a total of seventeen (17) berths.

As qualification to the World Championship was part of each regional league's season, namely the third split, each league decided its own formats and qualification methods. The LCP and the LPL were the only two leagues to qualify teams for the tournament via the championship points system, with the LPL additionally utilizing a regional qualifier bracket.

=== Qualification via Mid-Season Invitational ===
The remaining two slots were attributed to results gained at the 2026 Mid-Season Invitational, with the winning team earning a berth to the World Championship, provided it reached the playoffs of its region's third split. Meanwhile, the second best-performing region at MSI also received an additional berth.

== Qualified teams ==
Qualification took place from 2 August to 3 October. The dates are inclusive, either from the beginning until the end of each league's playoff phase or from the date when the first team from one region qualifies until the end of the season.

Qualification	Host	Dates	Qualified
Winner of the 2026 Mid-Season Invitational	(South Korea) Daejeon	28 June–12 July	Hanwha Life Esports
Finalists of the 2026 LCP Split 3 Playoffs; 2026 LCP Championship Points Leader	(Taiwan) Taipei	2–30 August	Team Secret Whales; CTBC Flying Oyster; MVK Esports
Winner of the 2026 LPL season 2026 LPL Championship Points Leader; Winners of the 2026 LPL Regional Qualifiers	(China) Suzhou (China) Shanghai	13 August–19 September	Anyone's Legend; Bilibili Gaming; Top Esports; Invictus Gaming
Winner and top 3 and 4 of the 2026 LCK playoffs (Note: Hanwha Life Esports won the 2026 LCK championship but formally qualified as the winner of MSI 2026 prior to the playoffs.)	(South Korea) Seoul	29 August–13 September	Gen.G; T1; Dplus KIA
Top Three of the 2026 LEC Summer Split playoffs	(Spain) Madrid (Germany) Berlin (France) Nice	5–20 September	G2 Esports; Movistar KOI; Karmine Corp
Finalists of the 2026 CBLOL Split 2 playoffs	(Brazil) São Paulo (Brazil) Rio de Janeiro	5 September–10 October	LØS; FURIA
Top Three of the 2026 LCS Summer Split playoffs	(United States) Los Angeles (United States) Atlanta	12 September–4 October	Team Liquid Alienware; LYON; Cloud9 KIA

== Qualification matches ==
Qualification matches did not necessarily determine the seeding of each team for the tournament.

=== MSI 2026 ===
Bilibili Gaming vs. Hanwha Life Esports | Grand Final

Since 2024, the MSI Champion is assured of a spot at the League of Legends World Championship provided it qualified for its region's playoffs during the third split. Hanwha Life Esports' victory over Bilibili Gaming reserved its spot in the tournament, but was not formalized yet at the time of victory due to the above-mentioned condition.

July 12	Bilibili Gaming	2	–	3	Hanwha Life Esports	Daejeon, South Korea
15:00 (UTC+9)						Daejeon Convention Center II
	K/D/A: 16/25/45; Gold: 80.5K; Turrets: 4 Drakes: 3 Elder Dragons: 0 Barons: 1 Rift Heralds: 0 Voidgrubs: 0	Game 1; 43:09; HLE leads series 1–0			K/D/A: 25/16/66; Gold: 87.7K; Turrets: 11; Drakes: 4 Elder Dragons: 0 Barons: 2 Rift Heralds: 1 Voidgrubs: 2	
	K/D/A: 28/15/58; Gold: 65.3K; Turrets: 6 Drakes: 4 Elder Dragons: 1 Barons: 1 Rift Heralds: 0 Voidgrubs: 2	Game 2; 32:10; Series tied 1–1			K/D/A: 15/28/33; Gold: 59.2K; Turrets: 3 Drakes: 0 Elder Dragons: 0 Barons: 0 Rift Heralds: 1 Voidgrubs: 1	
	K/D/A: 20/7/43; Gold: 66.8K; Turrets: 10; Drakes: 4 Elder Dragons: 0 Barons: 1 Rift Heralds: 1 Voidgrubs: 3	Game 3; 32:18; BLG leads series 2–1			K/D/A: 7/20/17; Gold: 54.8K; Turrets: 2 Drakes: 1 Elder Dragons: 0 Barons: 0 Rift Heralds: 0 Voidgrubs: 0	
	K/D/A: 13/28/29; Gold: 56.5K; Turrets: 2 Drakes: 0 Elder Dragons: 0 Barons: 0 Rift Heralds: 1 Voidgrubs: 0	Game 4; 31:08; Series tied 2–2			K/D/A: 28/13/64; Gold: 67.8K; Turrets: 10; Drakes: 4 Elder Dragons: 0 Barons: 1 Rift Heralds: 0 Voidgrubs: 3	
	K/D/A: 20/21/47; Gold: 69.5K; Turrets: 4 Drakes: 2 Elder Dragons: 0 Barons: 0 Rift Heralds: 1 Voidgrubs: 0	Game 5; 36:25; HLE wins series 3–2			K/D/A: 21/20/53; Gold: 73.0K; Turrets: 8 Drakes: 3 Elder Dragons: 0 Barons: 2 Rift Heralds: 0 Voidgrubs: 3	

=== CBLOL ===
LØS vs. LOUD | Upper Bracket Final

LØS advanced to its first World Championship with its five-game series win over LOUD.

September 27	LØS	3	–	2	LOUD	São Paulo, Brazil
13:00 (UTC-3)						Riot Games Arena
	K/D/A: 13/7/31; Gold: 65.7K; Turrets: 7 Drakes: 3 Elder Dragons: 0 Barons: 1 Rift Heralds: 1 Voidgrubs: 0	Game 1; 32:56; LOS leads series 1–0			K/D/A: 7/13/20; Gold: 58.8K; Turrets: 3 Drakes: 1 Elder Dragons: 0 Barons: 0 Rift Heralds: 0 Voidgrubs: 3	
	K/D/A: 17/6/42; Gold: 59.4K; Turrets: 7 Drakes: 2 Elder Dragons: 0 Barons: 1 Rift Heralds: 1 Voidgrubs: 3	Game 2; 29:13; LOS leads series 2–0			K/D/A: 6/17/10; Gold: 51.2K; Turrets: 3 Drakes: 2 Elder Dragons: 0 Barons: 0 Rift Heralds: 0 Voidgrubs: 0	
	K/D/A: 18/26/30; Gold: 87.0K; Turrets: 6 Drakes: 3 Elder Dragons: 0 Barons: 2 Rift Heralds: 0 Voidgrubs: 0	Game 3; 45:29; LOS leads series 2–1			K/D/A: 25/18/60; Gold: 92.2K; Turrets: 11; Drakes: 3 Elder Dragons: 0 Barons: 1 Rift Heralds: 1 Voidgrubs: 3	
	K/D/A: 17/18/31; Gold: 71.1K; Turrets: 3 Drakes: 3 Elder Dragons: 0 Barons: 1 Rift Heralds: 0 Voidgrubs: 0	Game 4; 38:06; Series tied 2–2			K/D/A: 18/17/45; Gold: 79.3K; Turrets: 10; Drakes: 2 Elder Dragons: 0 Barons: 1 Rift Heralds: 0 Voidgrubs: 3	
	K/D/A: 19/2/44; Gold: 68.2K; Turrets: 9 Drakes: 2 Elder Dragons: 0 Barons: 1 Rift Heralds: 0 Voidgrubs: 0	Game 5; 31:23; LOS wins series 3–2			K/D/A: 2/19/5; Gold: 53.4K; Turrets: 3 Drakes: 2 Elder Dragons: 0 Barons: 0 Rift Heralds: 1 Voidgrubs: 3	

LOUD vs. FURIA | Lower Bracket Final

With its 3–0 win over LOUD, FURIA qualified for its first League of Legends World Championship.

October 3	LOUD	0	–	3	FURIA	São Paulo, Brazil
13:00 (UTC-3)						Riot Games Arena
	K/D/A: 9/17/17; Gold: 46.3K; Turrets: 3 Drakes: 1 Elder Dragons: 0 Barons: 0 Rift Heralds: 0 Voidgrubs: 1	Game 1; 26:45; FUR leads series 1–0			K/D/A: 17/9/36; Gold: 57.2K; Turrets: 9 Drakes: 2 Elder Dragons: 0 Barons: 1 Rift Heralds: 1 Voidgrubs: 2	
	K/D/A: 9/20/12; Gold: 62.7K; Turrets: 4 Drakes: 3 Elder Dragons: 0 Barons: 0 Rift Heralds: 1 Voidgrubs: 3	Game 2; 34:56; FUR leads series 2–0			K/D/A: 20/9/58; Gold: 75.2K; Turrets: 8 Drakes: 3 Elder Dragons: 0 Barons: 2 Rift Heralds: 0 Voidgrubs: 0	
	K/D/A: 6/22/17; Gold: 48.5K; Turrets: 2 Drakes: 0 Elder Dragons: 0 Barons: 0 Rift Heralds: 0 Voidgrubs: 0	Game 3; 28:02; FUR wins series 3–0			K/D/A: 22/6/38; Gold: 59.1K; Turrets: 11; Drakes: 4 Elder Dragons: 0 Barons: 1 Rift Heralds: 1 Voidgrubs: 3	

=== LCK ===
Hanwha Life Esports vs. KT Rolster | Round 4 - Legend Group

After MSI 2026, Hanwha Life Esports was provisionally qualified for the World Championship, but its qualification for the LCK playoffs will confirm its place in the event. With their 2-1 win over KT Rolster, the team secured its slot in the tournament for the sixth time and the third under its current name (Note: Hanwha Life Esports was previously known as KOO Tigers, who qualified for the 2015 and 2016 editions of the tournament.), meeting the qualification conditions for the MSI winner.

August 15	Hanwha Life Esports	2	–	1	KT Rolster	Seoul, South Korea
17:00 (UTC+9)						CHZZK LoL Park
	K/D/A: 9/28/27; Gold: 68.4K; Turrets: 3 Drakes: 2 Elder Dragons: 0 Barons: 0 Rift Heralds: 0 Voidgrubs: 1	Game 1; 37:47; KT leads series 1–0			K/D/A: 28/9/74; Gold: 80.8K; Turrets: 10; Drakes: 4 Elder Dragons: 0 Barons: 3 Rift Heralds: 1 Voidgrubs: 1	
	K/D/A: 15/4/35; Gold: 52.7K; Turrets: 8 Drakes: 3 Elder Dragons: 0 Barons: 0 Rift Heralds: 1 Voidgrubs: 3	Game 2; 24:32; Series tied 1–1			K/D/A: 4/15/11; Gold: 40.1K; Turrets: 0 Drakes: 1 Elder Dragons: 0 Barons: 0 Rift Heralds: 0 Voidgrubs: 0	
	K/D/A: 17/4/34; Gold: 57.3K; Turrets: 11; Drakes: 4 Elder Dragons: 0 Barons: 1 Rift Heralds: 1 Voidgrubs: 3	Game 3; 26:04; HLE wins series 2–1			K/D/A: 4/17/12; Gold: 43.0K; Turrets: 1 Drakes: 0 Elder Dragons: 0 Barons: 0 Rift Heralds: 0 Voidgrubs: 0	

Gen.G vs. KT Rolster | Upper Bracket Round 2

Gen.G qualified for its seventh consecutive League of Legends World Championship since the 2020 edition through its win over 2025 finalists KT Rolster. The latter's opponents in the 2025 final, defending champions T1, while not having a qualification match, also secured its place in the tournanment through Gen.G's victory, as it had a higher seed over KT and qualified for the lower bracket semifinals, which constitute the playoffs final four.

September 1	Gen.G	3	–	0	KT Rolster	Seoul, South Korea
17:00 (UTC+9)						CHZZK LoL Park
	K/D/A: 15/16/38; Gold: 76.2K; Turrets: 9 Drakes: 0 Elder Dragons: 2 Barons: 1 Rift Heralds: 0 Voidgrubs: 0	Game 1; 35:54; GEN leads series 1–0			K/D/A: 16/15/37; Gold: 68.2K; Turrets: 6 Drakes: 4 Elder Dragons: 0 Barons: 1 Rift Heralds: 1 Voidgrubs: 3	
	K/D/A: 14/7/38; Gold: 68.8K; Turrets: 11; Drakes: 4 Elder Dragons: 0 Barons: 1 Rift Heralds: 1 Voidgrubs: 2	Game 2; 32:56; GEN leads series 2–0			K/D/A: 7/14/18; Gold: 58.0K; Turrets: 3 Drakes: 1 Elder Dragons: 0 Barons: 0 Rift Heralds: 0 Voidgrubs: 1	
	K/D/A: 16/3/55; Gold: 64.6K; Turrets: 9 Drakes: 1 Elder Dragons: 0 Barons: 1 Rift Heralds: 1 Voidgrubs: 2	Game 3; 28:24; GEN wins series 3–0			K/D/A: 3/16/4; Gold: 47.1K; Turrets: 1 Drakes: 2 Elder Dragons: 0 Barons: 0 Rift Heralds: 0 Voidgrubs: 1	

KT Rolster vs. Dplus KIA | Lower Bracket Round 2

After missing the 2025 edition, Dplus KIA secured its sixth World Championship appearance in seven years, joining T1 as the only two LCK teams to qualify for six tournaments throughout the said span since 2020. Meanwhile, 2025 finalists KT Rolster failed to qualify for the World Championship, becoming the first finalists to not qualify for the next edition since 2022 winners DRX, who weren't able to qualify for the 2023 tournament.

September 4	KT Rolster	1	–	3	Dplus KIA	Seoul, South Korea
17:00 (UTC+9)						CHZZK LoL Park
	K/D/A: 19/5/35; Gold: 66.5K; Turrets: 10; Drakes: 3 Elder Dragons: 0 Barons: 1 Rift Heralds: 1 Voidgrubs: 3	Game 1; 31:40; KT leads series 1–0			K/D/A: 5/19/11; Gold: 55.9K; Turrets: 2 Drakes: 1 Elder Dragons: 0 Barons: 0 Rift Heralds: 0 Voidgrubs: 0	
	K/D/A: 11/15/25; Gold: 76.3K; Turrets: 5 Drakes: 2 Elder Dragons: 0 Barons: 1 Rift Heralds: 0 Voidgrubs: 3	Game 2; 42:13; Series tied 1–1			K/D/A: 15/11/42; Gold: 79.5K; Turrets: 9 Drakes: 4 Elder Dragons: 0 Barons: 1 Rift Heralds: 1 Voidgrubs: 0	
	K/D/A: 4/19/11; Gold: 44.8K; Turrets: 0 Drakes: 1 Elder Dragons: 0 Barons: 0 Rift Heralds: 0 Voidgrubs: 3	Game 3; 26:51; DK leads series 2–1			K/D/A: 19/4/44; Gold: 58.0K; Turrets: 9 Drakes: 2 Elder Dragons: 0 Barons: 1 Rift Heralds: 1 Voidgrubs: 0	
	K/D/A: 10/17/19; Gold: 55.3K; Turrets: 1 Drakes: 2 Elder Dragons: 0 Barons: 0 Rift Heralds: 0 Voidgrubs: 0	Game 4; 31:09; DK wins series 3–1			K/D/A: 17/10/44; Gold: 69.6K; Turrets: 11; Drakes: 2 Elder Dragons: 0 Barons: 1 Rift Heralds: 1 Voidgrubs: 3	

=== LCP ===
Team Secret Whales vs. CTBC Flying Oyster | Swiss Stage 2-0 Round

Team Secret Whales previously won the first two splits of the season, placing them at first place in championship points. The team's victory over CTBC Flying Oyster secured a 3-0 swiss stage record, qualifying for playoffs and securing enough championship points to qualify for its fourth World Championship and the second under the current name, as it assured of at least a top three ranking in the said category. Later, Team Secret Whales qualified as a finalist of the 2026 LCP Split 3 Playoffs after the team's victory over CTBC Flying Oyster in Upper Bracket Final.

August 2	Team Secret Whales	3	–	0	CTBC Flying Oyster	Taipei, Taiwan
17:00 (UTC+8)						LCP Arena
	K/D/A: 23/10/41; Gold: 64.2K; Turrets: 10; Drakes: 2 Elder Dragons: 0 Barons: 1 Rift Heralds: 1 Voidgrubs: 3	Game 1; 28:57; TSW leads series 1–0			K/D/A: 10/23/16; Gold: 53.1K; Turrets: 1 Drakes: 1 Elder Dragons: 0 Barons: 0 Rift Heralds: 0 Voidgrubs: 0	
	K/D/A: 17/5/32; Gold: 68.0K; Turrets: 9 Drakes: 2 Elder Dragons: 0 Barons: 1 Rift Heralds: 1 Voidgrubs: 0	Game 2; 30:47; TSW leads series 2–0			K/D/A: 5/17/9; Gold: 50.3K; Turrets: 0 Drakes: 2 Elder Dragons: 0 Barons: 0 Rift Heralds: 0 Voidgrubs: 3	
	K/D/A: 22/4/48; Gold: 61.6K; Turrets: 10; Drakes: 4 Elder Dragons: 0 Barons: 1 Rift Heralds: 1 Voidgrubs: 1	Game 3; 27:40; TSW wins series 3–0			K/D/A: 4/22/7; Gold: 44.0K; Turrets: 0 Drakes: 0 Elder Dragons: 0 Barons: 0 Rift Heralds: 0 Voidgrubs: 2	

MVK Esports vs. GAM Esports | Lower Bracket Round 1

MVK Esports' victory over GAM Esports secured at least a top three ranking in the championship points, qualifying for the World Championship for the fifth appearance in its history.

August 22	MVK Esports	3	–	2	GAM Esports	Taipei, Taiwan
17:00 (UTC+8)						LCP Arena
	K/D/A: 6/18/11; Gold: 59.6K; Turrets: 2 Drakes: 0 Elder Dragons: 0 Barons: 0 Rift Heralds: 0 Voidgrubs: 2	Game 1; 33:06; GAM leads series 1–0			K/D/A: 18/6/54; Gold: 70.5K; Turrets: 9 Drakes: 4 Elder Dragons: 0 Barons: 2 Rift Heralds: 1 Voidgrubs: 1	
	K/D/A: 19/12/46; Gold: 77.3K; Turrets: 9 Drakes: 4 Elder Dragons: 1 Barons: 1 Rift Heralds: 0 Voidgrubs: 3	Game 2; 40:28; Series tied 1–1			K/D/A: 12/19/31; Gold: 74.0K; Turrets: 6 Drakes: 1 Elder Dragons: 0 Barons: 1 Rift Heralds: 1 Voidgrubs: 0	
	K/D/A: 4/18/6; Gold: 50.8K; Turrets: 1 Drakes: 0 Elder Dragons: 0 Barons: 0 Rift Heralds: 0 Voidgrubs: 2	Game 3; 29:40; GAM leads series 2–1			K/D/A: 18/4/53; Gold: 65.5K; Turrets: 9 Drakes: 4 Elder Dragons: 0 Barons: 1 Rift Heralds: 1 Voidgrubs: 1	
	K/D/A: 15/11/28; Gold: 60.7K; Turrets: 8 Drakes: 4 Elder Dragons: 0 Barons: 1 Rift Heralds: 1 Voidgrubs: 1	Game 4; 29:16; Series tied 2–2			K/D/A: 11/15/20; Gold: 50.6K; Turrets: 1 Drakes: 0 Elder Dragons: 0 Barons: 0 Rift Heralds: 0 Voidgrubs: 2	
	K/D/A: 22/25/55; Gold: 101.4K; Turrets: 13; Drakes: 3 Elder Dragons: 0 Barons: 2 Rift Heralds: 0 Voidgrubs: 3	Game 5; 50:17; MVK wins series 3–2			K/D/A: 25/22/58; Gold: 100.5K; Turrets: 6 Drakes: 4 Elder Dragons: 0 Barons: 1 Rift Heralds: 1 Voidgrubs: 0	

CTBC Flying Oyster vs. MVK Esports | Lower Bracket Final

CTBC Flying Oyster qualified for the World Championship as a finalist of the 2026 LCP Split 3 Playoffs after the team's victory over MVK Esports in Lower Bracket Final, making its fourth appearance in its fifth year as an organization.

August 29	CTBC Flying Oyster	3	–	1	MVK Esports	Taipei, Taiwan
16:00 (UTC+8)						Taipei Heping Basketball Gymnasium
	K/D/A: 32/15/70; Gold: 72.0K; Turrets: 11; Drakes: 4 Elder Dragons: 0 Barons: 1 Rift Heralds: 1 Voidgrubs: 0	Game 1; 31:13; CFO leads series 1–0			K/D/A: 15/32/42; Gold: 58.3K; Turrets: 1 Drakes: 0 Elder Dragons: 0 Barons: 0 Rift Heralds: 0 Voidgrubs: 3	
	K/D/A: 16/3/34; Gold: 62.1K; Turrets: 10; Drakes: 2 Elder Dragons: 0 Barons: 1 Rift Heralds: 1 Voidgrubs: 3	Game 2; 28:29; CFO leads series 2–0			K/D/A: 3/16/4; Gold: 46.8K; Turrets: 2 Drakes: 2 Elder Dragons: 0 Barons: 0 Rift Heralds: 0 Voidgrubs: 0	
	K/D/A: 9/26/15; Gold: 58.1K; Turrets: 3 Drakes: 0 Elder Dragons: 0 Barons: 0 Rift Heralds: 1 Voidgrubs: 3	Game 3; 29:54; CFO leads series 2–1			K/D/A: 26/9/57; Gold: 66.7K; Turrets: 11; Drakes: 4 Elder Dragons: 0 Barons: 1 Rift Heralds: 0 Voidgrubs: 0	
	K/D/A: 16/7/33; Gold: 56.4K; Turrets: 10; Drakes: 2 Elder Dragons: 0 Barons: 1 Rift Heralds: 1 Voidgrubs: 3	Game 4; 26:58; CFO wins series 3–1			K/D/A: 7/16/13; Gold: 47.2K; Turrets: 3 Drakes: 2 Elder Dragons: 0 Barons: 0 Rift Heralds: 0 Voidgrubs: 0	

=== LCS ===
LYON vs. Cloud9 KIA | Upper Bracket Round 2

Cloud9 KIA have not qualified for the World Championship since the 2023 edition after missing the 2024 and 2025 tournaments, nearly qualifying for the former. With their 3–1 upset victory over reigning league champions LYON, Cloud9 secured its place at the League of Legends World Championship for the first time in three years and its 11th appearance overall.

September 19	LYON	1	–	3	Cloud9 KIA	Los Angeles, United States
13:00 (UTC-7)						Riot Games Arena
	K/D/A: 11/14/28; Gold: 74.2K; Turrets: 4 Drakes: 0 Elder Dragons: 1 Barons: 0 Rift Heralds: 0 Voidgrubs: 3	Game 1; 40:36; C9 leads series 1–0			K/D/A: 14/11/32; Gold: 77.3K; Turrets: 9 Drakes: 4 Elder Dragons: 0 Barons: 2 Rift Heralds: 1 Voidgrubs: 0	
	K/D/A: 18/20/44; Gold: 82.3K; Turrets: 9 Drakes: 4 Elder Dragons: 1 Barons: 3 Rift Heralds: 0 Voidgrubs: 1	Game 2; 42:33; Series tied 1–1			K/D/A: 20/18/45; Gold: 81.4K; Turrets: 8 Drakes: 2 Elder Dragons: 0 Barons: 0 Rift Heralds: 1 Voidgrubs: 2	
	K/D/A: 3/11/4; Gold: 76.8K; Turrets: 4 Drakes: 4 Elder Dragons: 0 Barons: 0 Rift Heralds: 0 Voidgrubs: 3	Game 3; 43:53; C9 leads series 2–1			K/D/A: 11/3/27; Gold: 82.9K; Turrets: 8 Drakes: 3 Elder Dragons: 0 Barons: 1 Rift Heralds: 1 Voidgrubs: 0	
	K/D/A: 0/13/0; Gold: 39.8K; Turrets: 0 Drakes: 1 Elder Dragons: 0 Barons: 0 Rift Heralds: 0 Voidgrubs: 0	Game 4; 25:22; C9 wins series 3–1			K/D/A: 13/0/29; Gold: 52.3K; Turrets: 8 Drakes: 2 Elder Dragons: 0 Barons: 1 Rift Heralds: 1 Voidgrubs: 3	

Team Liquid Alienware vs. FlyQuest | Upper Bracket Round 2

After missing the 2025 edition, Team Liquid Alienware secured its sixth World Championship and the first under the current name with their 3–0 victory over FlyQuest.

September 20	Team Liquid Alienware	3	–	0	FlyQuest	Los Angeles, United States
13:00 (UTC-7)						Riot Games Arena
	K/D/A: 18/4/41; Gold: 71.8K; Turrets: 11; Drakes: 3 Elder Dragons: 0 Barons: 2 Rift Heralds: 1 Voidgrubs: 0	Game 1; 33:42; TLAW leads series 1–0			K/D/A: 4/18/12; Gold: 58.8K; Turrets: 1 Drakes: 2 Elder Dragons: 0 Barons: 0 Rift Heralds: 0 Voidgrubs: 3	
	K/D/A: 19/3/44; Gold: 68.7K; Turrets: 9 Drakes: 3 Elder Dragons: 0 Barons: 2 Rift Heralds: 1 Voidgrubs: 2	Game 2; 32:30; TLAW leads series 2–0			K/D/A: 3/19/8; Gold: 54.6K; Turrets: 2 Drakes: 2 Elder Dragons: 0 Barons: 0 Rift Heralds: 0 Voidgrubs: 1	
	K/D/A: 12/7/35; Gold: 84.3K; Turrets: 11; Drakes: 4 Elder Dragons: 0 Barons: 1 Rift Heralds: 0 Voidgrubs: 0	Game 3; 42:57; TLAW wins series 3–0			K/D/A: 7/12/12; Gold: 73.6K; Turrets: 5 Drakes: 3 Elder Dragons: 0 Barons: 1 Rift Heralds: 1 Voidgrubs: 3	

LYON vs. Shopify Rebellion | Lower Bracket Round 3

LYON qualified for their first World Championship under their current name and fifth in its history with a 3-1 victory over Shopify Rebellion. In addition, they became the first Latin America-based organisation to qualify for the World Championship since the LLA's closure in 2024.

September 26	LYON	3	–	1	Shopify Rebellion	Los Angeles, United States
13:00 (UTC-7)						Riot Games Arena
	K/D/A: 13/5/29; Gold: 70.1K; Turrets: 10; Drakes: 4 Elder Dragons: 1 Barons: 2 Rift Heralds: 1 Voidgrubs: 2	Game 1; 35:37; LYON leads series 1–0			K/D/A: 5/13/7; Gold: 59.9K; Turrets: 3 Drakes: 1 Elder Dragons: 0 Barons: 0 Rift Heralds: 0 Voidgrubs: 1	
	K/D/A: 23/3/54; Gold: 58.6K; Turrets: 10; Drakes: 3 Elder Dragons: 0 Barons: 1 Rift Heralds: 1 Voidgrubs: 2	Game 2; 26:44; LYON leads series 2–0			K/D/A: 3/23/7; Gold: 43.3K; Turrets: 0 Drakes: 1 Elder Dragons: 0 Barons: 0 Rift Heralds: 0 Voidgrubs: 1	
	K/D/A: 6/10/13; Gold: 54.1K; Turrets: 3 Drakes: 0 Elder Dragons: 0 Barons: 0 Rift Heralds: 1 Voidgrubs: 3	Game 3; 31:36; LYON leads series 2–1			K/D/A: 10/6/32; Gold: 63.3K; Turrets: 10; Drakes: 4 Elder Dragons: 0 Barons: 2 Rift Heralds: 0 Voidgrubs: 0	
	K/D/A: 24/8/64; Gold: 71.4K; Turrets: 10; Drakes: 4 Elder Dragons: 0 Barons: 2 Rift Heralds: 0 Voidgrubs: 0	Game 4; 32:15; LYON wins series 3–1			K/D/A: 8/24/19; Gold: 59.1K; Turrets: 4 Drakes: 1 Elder Dragons: 0 Barons: 0 Rift Heralds: 1 Voidgrubs: 3	

=== LEC ===
Team Vitality vs. G2 Esports | Upper Bracket Round 1

With its 3–0 win over Team Vitality, G2 Esports secured its 10th League of Legends World Championship in eleven years, with their only absence being in 2021.

September 5	Team Vitality	0	–	3	G2 Esports	Madrid, Spain
17:00 (UTC+2)						Madrid Arena
	K/D/A: 18/22/39; Gold: 73.3K; Turrets: 5 Drakes: 2 Elder Dragons: 0 Barons: 1 Rift Heralds: 0 Voidgrubs: 1	Game 1; 38:28; G2 leads series 1–0			K/D/A: 22/18/57; Gold: 82.6K; Turrets: 10; Drakes: 4 Elder Dragons: 0 Barons: 2 Rift Heralds: 1 Voidgrubs: 2	
	K/D/A: 12/19/29; Gold: 60.1K; Turrets: 3 Drakes: 3 Elder Dragons: 0 Barons: 0 Rift Heralds: 1 Voidgrubs: 0	Game 2; 33:55; G2 leads series 2–0			K/D/A: 19/12/42; Gold: 71.7K; Turrets: 9 Drakes: 2 Elder Dragons: 0 Barons: 2 Rift Heralds: 0 Voidgrubs: 3	
	K/D/A: 10/15/19; Gold: 51.3K; Turrets: 3 Drakes: 2 Elder Dragons: 0 Barons: 0 Rift Heralds: 0 Voidgrubs: 0	Game 3; 29:01; G2 wins series 3–0			K/D/A: 15/10/26; Gold: 62.1K; Turrets: 10; Drakes: 2 Elder Dragons: 0 Barons: 2 Rift Heralds: 1 Voidgrubs: 3	

Karmine Corp vs. GIANTX | Upper Bracket Round 1

After qualifying for its first international League of Legends competition in 2025 and its first Mid-Season Invitational in 2026, Karmine Corp qualified for the World Championship for the first time in its history, and became the third French-based organization to appear at the tournament after Against All Authority and Team Vitality.

September 5	Karmine Corp	3	–	1	GIANTX	Madrid, Spain
17:00 (UTC+2)						Madrid Arena
	K/D/A: 12/8/29; Gold: 70.3K; Turrets: 8 Drakes: 2 Elder Dragons: 0 Barons: 0 Rift Heralds: 1 Voidgrubs: 2	Game 1; 35:04; KC leads series 1–0			K/D/A: 8/12/16; Gold: 61.7K; Turrets: 3 Drakes: 3 Elder Dragons: 0 Barons: 0 Rift Heralds: 0 Voidgrubs: 1	
	K/D/A: 12/22/35; Gold: 65.4K; Turrets: 3 Drakes: 1 Elder Dragons: 0 Barons: 0 Rift Heralds: 1 Voidgrubs: 0	Game 2; 35:54; Series tied 1–1			K/D/A: 22/12/66; Gold: 75.9K; Turrets: 11; Drakes: 4 Elder Dragons: 0 Barons: 2 Rift Heralds: 0 Voidgrubs: 3	
	K/D/A: 14/1/30; Gold: 57.8K; Turrets: 10; Drakes: 4 Elder Dragons: 0 Barons: 1 Rift Heralds: 0 Voidgrubs: 1	Game 3; 26:21; KC leads series 2–1			K/D/A: 1/14/3; Gold: 42.4K; Turrets: 1 Drakes: 0 Elder Dragons: 0 Barons: 0 Rift Heralds: 1 Voidgrubs: 2	
	K/D/A: 20/6/40; Gold: 60.2K; Turrets: 7 Drakes: 3 Elder Dragons: 0 Barons: 1 Rift Heralds: 1 Voidgrubs: 2	Game 4; 26:29; KC wins series 3–1			K/D/A: 6/20/12; Gold: 45.5K; Turrets: 1 Drakes: 0 Elder Dragons: 0 Barons: 0 Rift Heralds: 0 Voidgrubs: 1	

Natus Vincere vs. Movistar KOI | Lower Bracket Round 2

Movistar KOI advanced to its ninth World Championship and the second under the current name.

September 18	Natus Vincere	1	–	3	Movistar KOI	Nice, France
17:00 (UTC+2)						Palais Nikaïa
	K/D/A: 16/14/45; Gold: 80.3K; Turrets: 7 Drakes: 3 Elder Dragons: 0 Barons: 0 Rift Heralds: 0 Voidgrubs: 1	Game 1; 41:23; NAVI leads series 1–0			K/D/A: 14/16/36; Gold: 80.6K; Turrets: 6 Drakes: 4 Elder Dragons: 0 Barons: 2 Rift Heralds: 1 Voidgrubs: 2	
	K/D/A: 6/20/15; Gold: 50.0K; Turrets: 2 Drakes: 1 Elder Dragons: 0 Barons: 0 Rift Heralds: 0 Voidgrubs: 0	Game 2; 28:07; Series tied 1–1			K/D/A: 20/6/52; Gold: 64.0K; Turrets: 10; Drakes: 3 Elder Dragons: 0 Barons: 1 Rift Heralds: 1 Voidgrubs: 3	
	K/D/A: 5/19/13; Gold: 55.4K; Turrets: 2 Drakes: 0 Elder Dragons: 0 Barons: 0 Rift Heralds: 0 Voidgrubs: 1	Game 3; 32:12; MKOI leads series 2–1			K/D/A: 19/6/48; Gold: 67.7K; Turrets: 10; Drakes: 4 Elder Dragons: 1 Barons: 2 Rift Heralds: 1 Voidgrubs: 2	
	K/D/A: 8/17/20; Gold: 61.8K; Turrets: 3 Drakes: 2 Elder Dragons: 0 Barons: 0 Rift Heralds: 1 Voidgrubs: 2	Game 4; 34:31; MKOI wins series 3–1			K/D/A: 17/8/41; Gold: 75.1K; Turrets: 10; Drakes: 4 Elder Dragons: 0 Barons: 2 Rift Heralds: 0 Voidgrubs: 1	

=== LPL ===
TT Gaming vs. Bilibili Gaming | Group Ascend

Bilibili Gaming finished as winners of the previous two splits of the season, putting them at first in championship points heading into the third split. The team's win over TT Gaming secured at least a top two ranking in the said category, qualifying for its fourth consecutive World Championship.

August 13	TT Gaming	0	–	2	Bilibili Gaming	Suzhou, China
19:00 (UTC+8)						Yangcheng International Esports Center
	K/D/A: 5/25/10; Gold: 49.2K; Turrets: 2 Drakes: 0 Elder Dragons: 0 Barons: 0 Rift Heralds: 0 Voidgrubs: 3	Game 1; 29:30; BLG leads series 1–0			K/D/A: 25/5/57; Gold: 62.9K; Turrets: 11; Drakes: 4 Elder Dragons: 0 Barons: 2 Rift Heralds: 1 Voidgrubs: 0	
	K/D/A: 26/6/60; Gold: 59.1K; Turrets: 11; Drakes: 2 Elder Dragons: 0 Barons: 1 Rift Heralds: 1 Voidgrubs: 3	Game 2; 25:07; BLG wins series 2–0			K/D/A: 6/26/13; Gold: 41.6K; Turrets: 0 Drakes: 1 Elder Dragons: 0 Barons: 0 Rift Heralds: 0 Voidgrubs: 0	

Anyone's Legend vs. Invictus Gaming | Lower Bracket Final

Anyone's Legend's victory over Invictus Gaming in a five-game series secured at least a top two ranking in the championship points, qualifying for its second consecutive World Championship. Later, Anyone's Legend qualified as the winner of the 2026 LPL season after the team's victory over Bilibili Gaming in Grand Final.

September 12	Anyone's Legend	3	–	2	Invictus Gaming	Shanghai, China
17:00 (UTC+8)						Shanghai Oriental Sports Center
	K/D/A: 11/24/29; Gold: 68.3K; Turrets: 3 Drakes: 3 Elder Dragons: 0 Barons: 1 Rift Heralds: 0 Voidgrubs: 2	Game 1; 37:55; IG leads series 1–0			K/D/A: 24/11/59; Gold: 74.5K; Turrets: 8 Drakes: 3 Elder Dragons: 0 Barons: 1 Rift Heralds: 1 Voidgrubs: 1	
	K/D/A: 21/8/49; Gold: 72.4K; Turrets: 10; Drakes: 4 Elder Dragons: 0 Barons: 2 Rift Heralds: 1 Voidgrubs: 3	Game 2; 36:26; Series tied 1–1			K/D/A: 8/21/14; Gold: 67.0K; Turrets: 5 Drakes: 1 Elder Dragons: 0 Barons: 0 Rift Heralds: 0 Voidgrubs: 0	
	K/D/A: 15/5/34; Gold: 63.9K; Turrets: 8 Drakes: 2 Elder Dragons: 0 Barons: 2 Rift Heralds: 0 Voidgrubs: 3	Game 3; 31:55; AL leads series 2–1			K/D/A: 5/15/8; Gold: 55.5K; Turrets: 2 Drakes: 3 Elder Dragons: 0 Barons: 0 Rift Heralds: 1 Voidgrubs: 0	
	K/D/A: 15/16/30; Gold: 55.2K; Turrets: 1 Drakes: 2 Elder Dragons: 0 Barons: 0 Rift Heralds: 1 Voidgrubs: 0	Game 4; 29:37; Series tied 2–2			K/D/A: 16/15/30; Gold: 61.0K; Turrets: 7 Drakes: 2 Elder Dragons: 0 Barons: 2 Rift Heralds: 0 Voidgrubs: 3	
	K/D/A: 20/5/53; Gold: 62.7K; Turrets: 8 Drakes: 4 Elder Dragons: 0 Barons: 1 Rift Heralds: 1 Voidgrubs: 0	Game 5; 30:11; AL wins series 3–2			K/D/A: 5/20/10; Gold: 50.2K; Turrets: 1 Drakes: 0 Elder Dragons: 0 Barons: 0 Rift Heralds: 0 Voidgrubs: 3	

Top Esports vs. Invictus Gaming | Regional Qualifier 3rd Seed Playoff

Both Top Esports and Invictus Gaming qualified for the 3rd seed playoff by virtue of placing third and fourth, respectively, in the championship points ranking. With their 3–1 win, Top Esports secured its spot at the World Championship for the fifth time and Invictus Gaming was relegated to the 4th seed playoff.

September 17	Top Esports	3	–	1	Invictus Gaming	Shanghai, China
17:00 (UTC+8)						League Arena
	K/D/A: 12/11/29; Gold: 68.6K; Turrets: 5 Drakes: 3 Elder Dragons: 0 Barons: 0 Rift Heralds: 0 Voidgrubs: 1	Game 1; 40:23; IG leads series 1–0			K/D/A: 11/12/32; Gold: 74.8K; Turrets: 10; Drakes: 4 Elder Dragons: 0 Barons: 2 Rift Heralds: 1 Voidgrubs: 2	
	K/D/A: 14/8/30; Gold: 60.2K; Turrets: 9 Drakes: 2 Elder Dragons: 0 Barons: 0 Rift Heralds: 0 Voidgrubs: 3	Game 2; 31:07; Series tied 1–1			K/D/A: 8/14/19; Gold: 54.3K; Turrets: 3 Drakes: 3 Elder Dragons: 0 Barons: 1 Rift Heralds: 1 Voidgrubs: 0	
	K/D/A: 29/13/63; Gold: 77.1K; Turrets: 9 Drakes: 3 Elder Dragons: 0 Barons: 1 Rift Heralds: 0 Voidgrubs: 2	Game 3; 35:55; TES leads series 2–1			K/D/A: 13/29/34; Gold: 64.0K; Turrets: 2 Drakes: 2 Elder Dragons: 0 Barons: 0 Rift Heralds: 1 Voidgrubs: 1	
	K/D/A: 23/13/57; Gold: 76.7K; Turrets: 9 Drakes: 4 Elder Dragons: 1 Barons: 2 Rift Heralds: 1 Voidgrubs: 2	Game 4; 37:44; TES wins series 3–1			K/D/A: 13/23/28; Gold: 72.4K; Turrets: 6 Drakes: 1 Elder Dragons: 0 Barons: 1 Rift Heralds: 0 Voidgrubs: 1	

Invictus Gaming vs. JD Gaming | Regional Qualifier 4th Seed Playoff

JD Gaming advanced to the 4th seed playoff after winning its elimination series against fifth seed Team WE. With their 3–1 victory over JD Gaming, Invictus Gaming qualified for its sixth World Championship.

September 19	Invictus Gaming	3	–	1	JD Gaming	Shanghai, China
17:00 (UTC+8)						League Arena
	K/D/A: 11/3/27; Gold: 67.7K; Turrets: 10; Drakes: 4 Elder Dragons: 0 Barons: 2 Rift Heralds: 0 Voidgrubs: 1	Game 1; 33:26; IG leads series 1–0			K/D/A: 3/11/4; Gold: 56.2K; Turrets: 3 Drakes: 1 Elder Dragons: 0 Barons: 0 Rift Heralds: 1 Voidgrubs: 2	
	K/D/A: 20/10/54; Gold: 70.5K; Turrets: 10; Drakes: 4 Elder Dragons: 0 Barons: 1 Rift Heralds: 1 Voidgrubs: 1	Game 2; 32:57; IG leads series 2–0			K/D/A: 10/20/24; Gold: 57.6K; Turrets: 1 Drakes: 1 Elder Dragons: 0 Barons: 0 Rift Heralds: 0 Voidgrubs: 2	
	K/D/A: 16/27/40; Gold: 65.4K; Turrets: 5 Drakes: 1 Elder Dragons: 0 Barons: 2 Rift Heralds: 0 Voidgrubs: 1	Game 3; 34:18; IG leads series 2–1			K/D/A: 26/16/53; Gold: 68.7K; Turrets: 7 Drakes: 4 Elder Dragons: 0 Barons: 0 Rift Heralds: 1 Voidgrubs: 2	
	K/D/A: 25/20/61; Gold: 72.7K; Turrets: 9 Drakes: 3 Elder Dragons: 0 Barons: 2 Rift Heralds: 0 Voidgrubs: 0	Game 4; 34:14; IG wins series 3–1			K/D/A: 19/25/34; Gold: 65.3K; Turrets: 2 Drakes: 2 Elder Dragons: 0 Barons: 0 Rift Heralds: 1 Voidgrubs: 3	
