= LoL Park =

Esports and recreational facility in Seoul, South Korea

CHZZK LoL Park
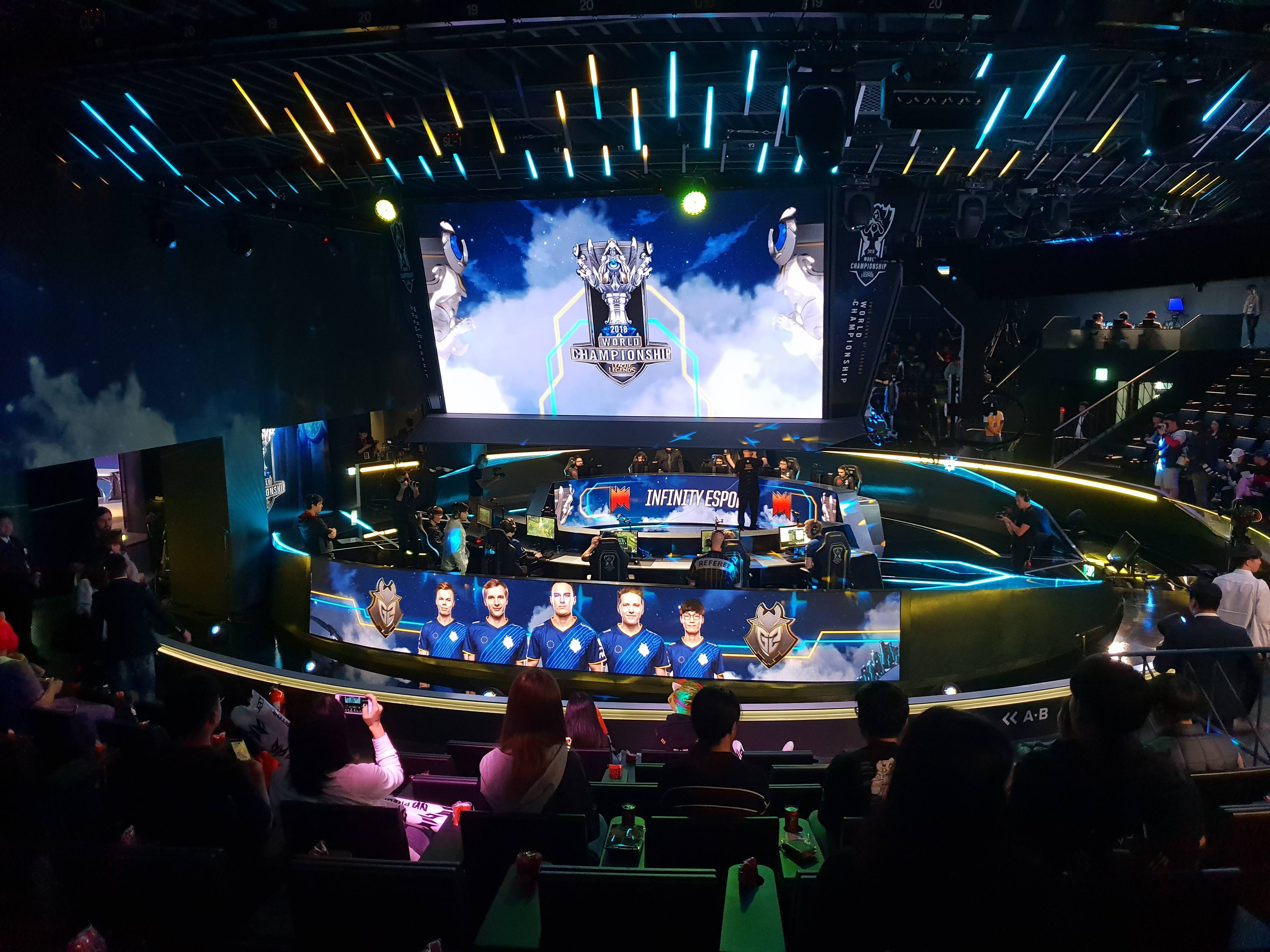
- LoL Park during the 2018 League of Legends World Championship
- Interactive map of CHZZK LoL Park
- Former names: LoL Park (2018–2025)
- Location: Jongno, Seoul, South Korea
- Capacity: 450 (esports arena)

Construction
- Opened: September 2018; 8 years ago

Tenant
- League of Legends Champions Korea

LoL Park (Korean: 롤파크), known as CHZZK LoL Park (치지직 롤파크) for sponsorship reasons, is an esports and recreational facility located in Jongno, Seoul, South Korea. The venue hosts League of Legends Champions Korea (LCK), the top-tier League of Legends competition in the country.

LoL Park was first unveiled in November 2017 and opened in September 2018. The entire facility costed ₩100 billion (US$88.46 million in 2017) with the main area being an esports arena that mostly hosts LCK games. The facility also includes a PC bang, a café, merchandise stores, and an LCK-themed exhibition.

== History ==
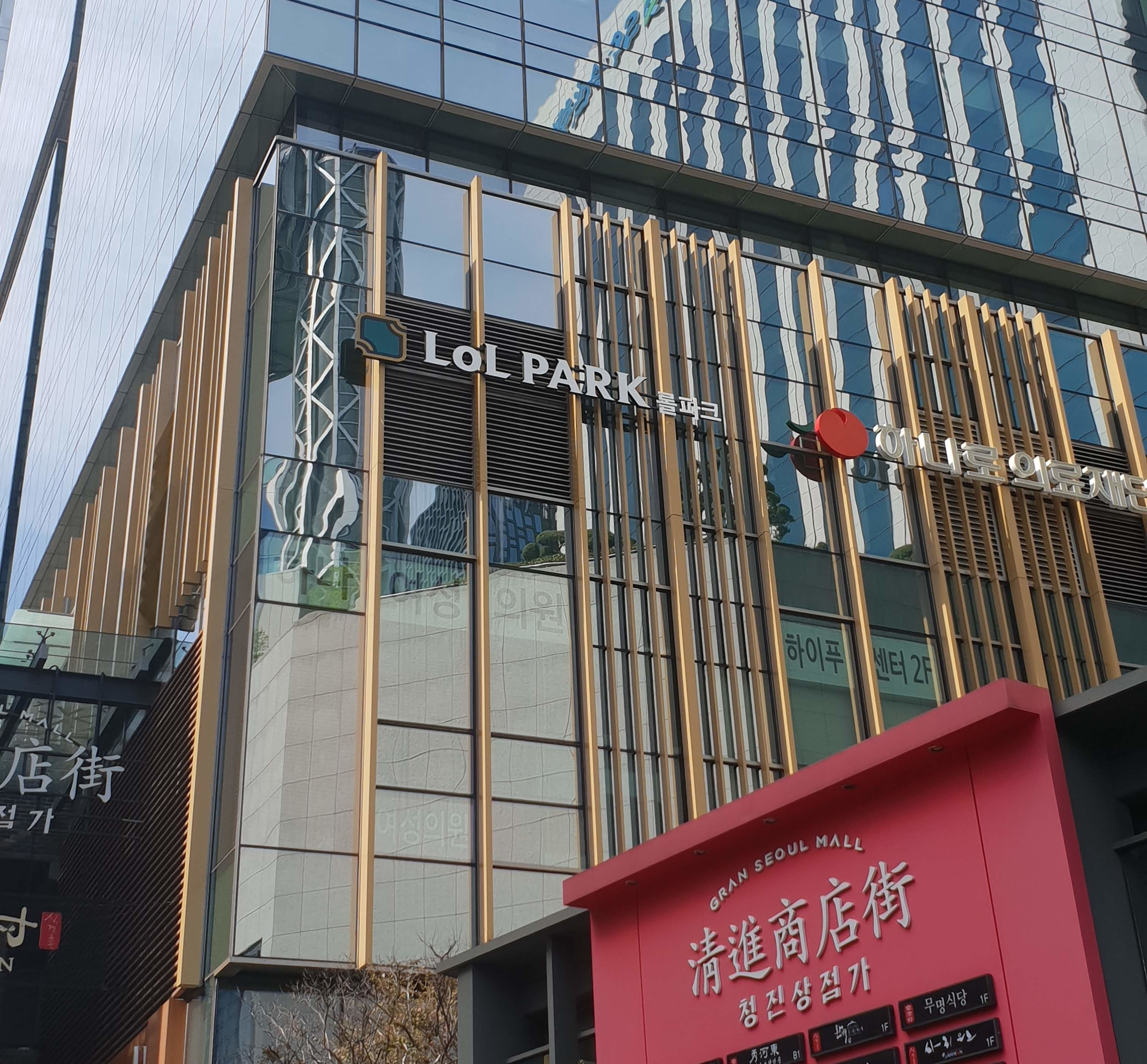
LoL Park signage at the Gran Seoul office.

In November 2017, Riot Games announced LoL Park, intended to allow Riot to broadcast its South Korean League of Legends competition, League of Legends Champions Korea, on its own right, similar to the North American League of Legends Championship Series and European League of Legends Championship Series. The venue would be built inside of the Gran Seoul office in Jongno, Seoul. The main arena would be 56,900 sq ft (5,286.18 m^{2}) large, and have a capacity of 450.

The arena opened in September 2018, in time for South Korea's hosting of the 2018 League of Legends World Championship, where LoL Park hosted the play-in stage of the event.

The facility was closed to the public in 2020 due to the COVID-19 pandemic in South Korea, and any LCK matches held at the venue during that time were done behind closed doors. A limited live audience was allowed for a part of the 2021 LCK season, before fully re-opening starting with the 2022 LCK season.

International League of Legends competition would return to the venue for the 2023 League of Legends World Championship, where it once again hosted the play-in stage. They would then host the inaugural First Stand Tournament in March 2025. In March 2024, the arena was given its own LoL servers following multiple DDoS attacks that occurred on previous occasions.

In November 2025, LoL Park hosted the 2025 Valorant Game Changers Championship.

On 16 December 2025, as part of Naver's acquisition of the broadcast rights to LCK, the venue was rebranded to CHZZK LoL Park, named after the company's streaming platform, CHZZK.

== Other facilities ==
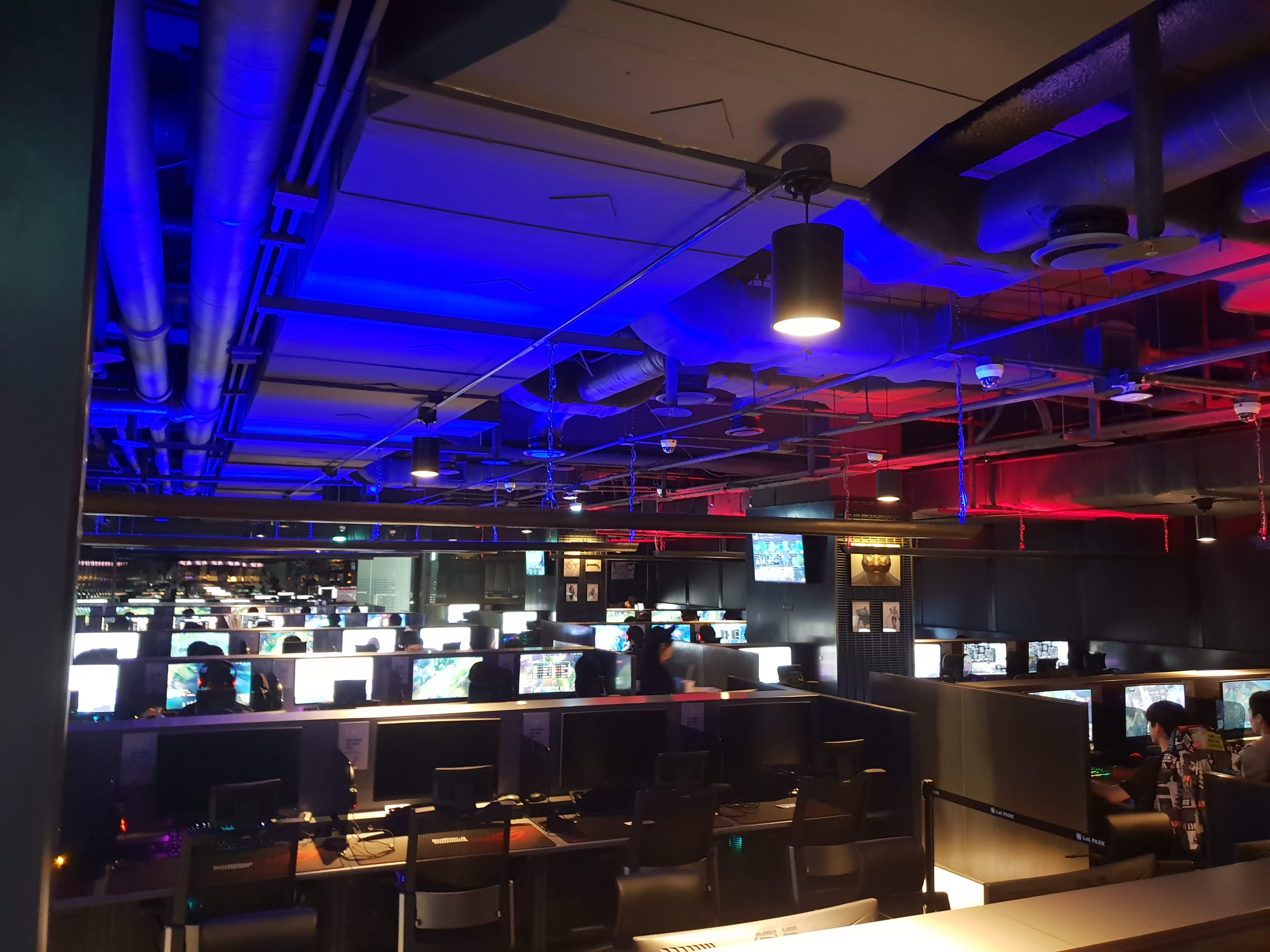
The PC bang located inside of LoL Park.

Other areas aside from the main esports arena include the LCK Exhibition, which includes memorabilia of all participating LCK teams, a PC bang which can serve 100 customers at a time, a café themed around the fictional location Bilgewater, and two merchandise stores.

== See also ==
- Riot Games Arena
