= 2026 League of Legends World Championship =

16th competition of the League of Legends World Championship

Tournament information
- Sport: League of Legends
- Location: United States
- Dates: 15 October–14 November
- Administrator: Riot Games
- Host(s): Los Angeles; Allen; New York City
- Venue: 3 (in 3 host cities)
- Teams: 19
- Purse: US$5,000,000

Final positions
- Champion: Bilibili Gaming
- Runner-up: Gen.G
- MVP: Zhuo "Knight" Ding (Bilibili Gaming)

The 2026 League of Legends World Championship was an esports tournament for the multiplayer online battle arena video game League of Legends, held in the United States — in Los Angeles, California; Allen, Texas of the Dallas–Fort Worth metroplex; and New York City, New York, from 15 October to 14 November. It was the sixteenth iteration of the League of Legends World Championship, an annual international tournament organised by the game's developer, Riot Games.

It was the United States' fifth hosting of the tournament, the fourth World Championship hosted in Los Angeles and the first since 2016, the third staged in New York City after the 2016 and 2022 editions, and the first international League of Legends competition in the state of Texas. Nineteen teams qualified based on placement within their regional leagues and results gained in the 2026 Mid-Season Invitational (MSI).

The final was played on 14 November 2026, with Bilibili Gaming from China's League of Legends Pro League (LPL) winning their first-ever World Championship with a 3–1 scoreline against Gen.G from the League of Legends Champions Korea (LCK). For his performance in the final, Zhuo "Knight" Ding was awarded the MVP honours as he became the first Chinese mid-laner to win a World Championship, and the first non-Korean mid-laner to win the event since Kurtis "Toyz" Lau of the Taipei Assassins in 2012.

T1 of the LCK were the three-time defending champions, but were eliminated in the semifinals by eventual champions Bilibili Gaming. Their loss ended the organization's 13-game undefeated best-of-5 win streak against teams from the LPL, and marked the first time since 2021 that they did not appear in the finals of the World Championship.

== Host selection ==
In a development update video published on 8 January 2025 to begin that year's competitive season, Riot Games announced that North America would host the 2026 edition of Worlds, with the United States being confirmed as the host country during the media day for the 2025 World Championship Final in Chengdu, China months later on 7 November 2025. Two cities were initially announced to host the tournament - Allen, Texas of the Dallas–Fort Worth metroplex and New York City.

In an interview days before the 2025 World Championship final, Global Head of LoL Esports Chris Greeley stated that the play-in and Swiss stages had been planned to be hosted at the Riot Games Arena in Los Angeles, mirroring the setup of the 2024 World Championship held in Europe. However, fans had provided feedback that the Riot Games Arena in Berlin, which hosted the play-in and Swiss stages of the 2024 World Championship was too small. Citing budget and logistical capabilities, Riot decided to move both stages to a "bigger venue" in Texas. On 22 March 2026, Riot announced that due to "logistical challenges," the play-in stage was moved back to the Riot Games Arena in Los Angeles.

Los Angeles hosted the play-in stage, while Allen staged the Swiss stage, quarterfinals, and semifinals. Los Angeles is the home city of the League Championship Series (LCS) and the Valorant Champions Tour (VCT) Americas, while Allen hosted the 2025 League of Legends Championship of The Americas (LTA) Championship Finals in September of the same year, which was the only finals of the LTA after the announcement of its discontinuation after only one season. New York City hosted the Final, becoming the first East Coast city to do so. It previously hosted the semifinals of the 2016 World Championship and the group stage and quarterfinals of the 2022 edition.

== Venues ==
Three venues were being used for the tournament. In an article posted by Riot Games on 8 January 2026 to begin the said year's competitive season, it was announced that the Credit Union of Texas Event Center in Allen, Texas, a northern suburb of the Dallas-Fort Worth metroplex, would host the play-in, Swiss stage, quarterfinals and semifinals. The event center notably hosted the 2025 LTA Championship finals. The Barclays Center in Brooklyn, one of New York City's five boroughs, will stage the finals. During the finals of the 2026 First Stand Tournament in São Paulo, Brazil on 22 March 2026, Riot Games announced that the play-in stage would instead be hosted in the Riot Games Arena in Los Angeles, the home studio of the League Championship Series (LCS).

United States
Los Angeles, California	Allen, Texas			New York City, New York
Play-in stage	Swiss stage	Quarterfinals	Semifinals	Finals
Riot Games Arena	Credit Union of Texas Event Center			Barclays Center
Capacity: 300	Capacity: 8,100			Capacity: 19,000
2026 League of Legends World Championship is located in the United States

== Qualification ==
As the top two performing regions at the 2026 Mid-Season Invitational, the League of Legends Champions Korea (LCK) and the League of Legends Pro League (LPL) qualified four teams to the tournament, including the winners, Hanwha Life Esports. The League of Legends EMEA Championship (LEC), League Championship Series (LCS), and the League of Legends Championship Pacific (LCP) qualified three teams each, while the Campeonato Brasileiro de League of Legends (CBLOL) qualified two teams.

CBLOL was initially allotted one slot for the tournament. The initial announcement was met with criticism from local fans, citing CBLOL teams' performances against LCS teams during the 2025 LTA playoffs and the 2026 Americas Cup. The league was awarded another spot in the World Championship on 22 March 2026.

This will be the first World Championship to feature teams from the LCS and CBLOL since the 2024 edition, following the split of the League of Legends Championship of The Americas (LTA) region in September 2025.

=== Qualified teams ===
Team Secret Whales of the LCP became the first team to qualify for the tournament on 2 August 2026 by securing enough championship points to finish at least in the top three in said category. Days later, Bilibili Gaming of the LPL confirmed its slot in the event, also through assuring of at least a top two finish in championship points. On 15 August, 2026 Mid-Season Invitational winners Hanwha Life Esports of the LCK officially qualified for the World Championship through its qualification for the LCK Playoffs. Between 22 and 29 August, the LCP became the first region to complete its slate of qualified teams, with MVK Esports and CTBC Flying Oyster qualifying for the tournament. Defending world champions T1 and Gen.G confirmed their qualification on 1 September, with Dplus KIA completing the list of the LCK's representatives at the tournament three days later.

On 5 September, G2 Esports and Karmine Corp became the first two qualified teams from the LEC. On 12 September, Anyone's Legend confirmed its qualification from the LPL. On 17 September, Top Esports of the LPL secured their spot in the tournament, with Movistar KOI being the last LEC team to qualify the following day. On 19 September, Invictus Gaming completed the LPL's slate of representatives at the tournament, and Cloud9 KIA became the first LCS team to qualify hours later. The next day, Team Liquid Alienware of the LCS advanced to the event. On 26 September, LYON became the last team of the LCS to confirm its qualification, with LØS being the first CBLOL team to qualify the following day. FURIA of the CBLOL rounded out the list of qualified teams on 3 October.

This is the first World Championship appearance for the LEC's Karmine Corp and the CBLOL's LØS and FURIA. Meanwhile, it is the first tournament for the LCP's MVK Esports under its current name, as it rebranded from MGN Vikings Esports prior to the 2026 season. The team was previously known as Vikings Esports when it last competed at the tournament during the 2024 edition. LYON of the LCS also makes its first appearance at the World Championship under its current name and its current league, having been known as Movistar R7 when it last appeared at the tournament in 2024 representing the now-defunct Liga Latinoamérica (LLA). The team joined the LCS when the league's teams was then part the Northern Conference of the League of Legends Championship of The Americas (LTA), before the revert back to the LCS during the 2026 season.

The teams that qualified for the event are:

Region	League	Qualification Path	Team
Starting from Swiss stage
Brazil; Southern Latin America	CBLOL	Split 2 Champion	LØS
South Korea	LCK	Season Champion	Gen.G
South Korea	LCK	Season Runner-up; 2026 Mid-Season Invitational Winner	Hanwha Life Esports
South Korea	LCK	Season 3rd Place	T1
South Korea	LCK	Season 4th Place	Dplus KIA
Asia-Pacific	LCP	Split 3 Champion	Team Secret Whales
Asia-Pacific	LCP	Split 3 Runner-up	CTBC Flying Oyster
North America; Northern Latin America	LCS	Summer Champion	Team Liquid Alienware
North America; Northern Latin America	LCS	Summer Runner-up	LYON
EMEA	LEC	Summer Champion	G2 Esports
EMEA	LEC	Summer Runner-up	Movistar KOI
China	LPL	Split 3 Champion	Anyone's Legend
China	LPL	Championship Points	Bilibili Gaming
China	LPL	Regional Qualifiers 3rd Seed Playoff Winner	Top Esports
China	LPL	Regional Qualifiers 4th Seed Playoff Winner	Invictus Gaming
Starting from Play-in stage
Brazil; Southern Latin America	CBLOL	Split 2 Runner-up	FURIA
Asia-Pacific	LCP	Championship Points	MVK Esports
North America; Northern Latin America	LCS	Summer 3rd Place	Cloud9 KIA
EMEA	LEC	Summer 3rd Place	Karmine Corp

== Format ==
Following the expansion of the tournament to 19 teams, the format was changed. Four (4) teams qualified for the play-in stage, which was a double-elimination best-of-five bracket. The winner of the play-in stage qualified for the tournament's swiss stage. Sixteen (16) teams competed in the Swiss stage, where the first eight (8) teams to achieve three (3) wins advanced to the knockout stage, which was a single-elimination bracket. All matches in the knockout stage were be best-of-five series.

The World Championship used the Fearless Draft format, where champions that have been played by either team become unavailable for both teams for the remainder of the series. Fearless Draft was used for all best-of-3 and best-of-5 series during the World Championship. This edition of Worlds was also the first to feature the Right of First Selection (RoFS).

== Play-in stage ==
The draw for the play-in stage was held on 10 October 2026 in Rio de Janeiro, Brazil after the CBLOL Split 2 finals.

- Venue: Riot Games Arena, Los Angeles, California
- Date and time: 15–18 October, matches start at 11:00 PDT (18:00 UTC)
- Four teams placed in a GSL-style double-elimination format
- Teams: 2nd seed from CBLOL; 3rd seed from LCP, LCS, and LEC

=== Bracket ===
Round 1
15 October, 11:00 PDT
Cloud9 KIA	2
Karmine Corp	3
15 October, 16:00 PDT
FURIA	0
MVK Esports	3
Lower Round 1
16 October, 16:00 PDT
Cloud9 KIA	1
FURIA	3

Round 2
16 October, 11:00 PDT
Karmine Corp	3
MVK Esports	0
Lower Round 2
17 October, 11:00 PDT
MVK Esports	3
FURIA	1

Qualification match
18 October, 11:00 PDT
Karmine Corp	3
MVK Esports	0

Source: LoL Esports

Round 1 Match 1	15 October	Cloud9 KIA	2	–	3	Karmine Corp	Los Angeles, United States
	11:00 (UTC−7)						Riot Games Arena
		K/D/A: 20/1/43; Gold: 76.0K; Turrets: 11; Drakes: 4 Elder Dragons: 0 Barons: 2 Rift Heralds: 0 Voidgrubs: 0	35:02; C9 leads series 1–0			K/D/A: 1/20/3; Gold: 57.4K; Turrets: 3 Drakes: 1 Elder Dragons: 0 Barons: 0 Rift Heralds: 1 Voidgrubs: 3	
		K/D/A: 16/14/34; Gold: 66.4K; Turrets: 5 Drakes: 3 Elder Dragons: 0 Barons: 1 Rift Heralds: 0 Voidgrubs: 3	35:10; Series tied 1–1			K/D/A: 14/16/32; Gold: 69.0K; Turrets: 7 Drakes: 3 Elder Dragons: 0 Barons: 0 Rift Heralds: 1 Voidgrubs: 0	
		K/D/A: 22/5/50; Gold: 78.8K; Turrets: 10; Drakes: 4 Elder Dragons: 1 Barons: 2 Rift Heralds: 1 Voidgrubs: 2	37:44; C9 leads series 2–1			K/D/A: 5/22/12; Gold: 64.7K; Turrets: 4 Drakes: 0 Elder Dragons: 0 Barons: 0 Rift Heralds: 0 Voidgrubs: 1	
		K/D/A: 6/15/17; Gold: 67.4K; Turrets: 4 Drakes: 1 Elder Dragons: 0 Barons: 0 Rift Heralds: 1 Voidgrubs: 3	38:08; Series tied 2–2			K/D/A: 15/6/31; Gold: 81.3K; Turrets: 9 Drakes: 4 Elder Dragons: 1 Barons: 1 Rift Heralds: 0 Voidgrubs: 0	
		K/D/A: 8/17/15; Gold: 55.7K; Turrets: 3 Drakes: 3 Elder Dragons: 0 Barons: 0 Rift Heralds: 0 Voidgrubs: 3	31:21; KC wins series 3–2			K/D/A: 17/8/49; Gold: 65.6K; Turrets: 8 Drakes: 2 Elder Dragons: 0 Barons: 2 Rift Heralds: 1 Voidgrubs: 0	

Round 1 Match 2	15 October	FURIA	0	–	3	MVK Esports	Los Angeles, United States
	16:00 (UTC−7)						Riot Games Arena
		K/D/A: 10/11/20; Gold: 65.9K; Turrets: 7 Drakes: 4 Elder Dragons: 0 Barons: 1 Rift Heralds: 0 Voidgrubs: 2	35:24; MVK leads series 1–0			K/D/A: 11/10/23; Gold: 70.7K; Turrets: 8 Drakes: 1 Elder Dragons: 0 Barons: 1 Rift Heralds: 1 Voidgrubs: 1	
		K/D/A: 13/28/31; Gold: 63.3K; Turrets: 0 Drakes: 2 Elder Dragons: 0 Barons: 0 Rift Heralds: 0 Voidgrubs: 2	34:56; MVK leads series 2–0			K/D/A: 27/13/62; Gold: 75.0K; Turrets: 10; Drakes: 3 Elder Dragons: 0 Barons: 2 Rift Heralds: 1 Voidgrubs: 1	
		K/D/A: 8/22/18; Gold: 46.2K; Turrets: 0 Drakes: 1 Elder Dragons: 0 Barons: 0 Rift Heralds: 0 Voidgrubs: 0	27:02; MVK wins series 3–0			K/D/A: 22/8/44; Gold: 59.4K; Turrets: 10; Drakes: 3 Elder Dragons: 0 Barons: 1 Rift Heralds: 1 Voidgrubs: 3	

Round 2 Match 3	16 October	Karmine Corp	3	–	0	MVK Esports	Los Angeles, United States
	11:00 (UTC−7)						Riot Games Arena
		K/D/A: 9/4/19; Gold: 63.7K; Turrets: 11; Drakes: 4 Elder Dragons: 0 Barons: 1 Rift Heralds: 1 Voidgrubs: 3	30:14; KC leads series 1–0			K/D/A: 4/9/9; Gold: 50.8K; Turrets: 1 Drakes: 1 Elder Dragons: 0 Barons: 0 Rift Heralds: 0 Voidgrubs: 0	
		K/D/A: 21/11/50; Gold: 68.8K; Turrets: 8 Drakes: 3 Elder Dragons: 0 Barons: 1 Rift Heralds: 1 Voidgrubs: 1	33:03; KC leads series 2–0			K/D/A: 11/21/13; Gold: 61.7K; Turrets: 4 Drakes: 2 Elder Dragons: 0 Barons: 1 Rift Heralds: 0 Voidgrubs: 2	
		K/D/A: 14/7/21; Gold: 71.9K; Turrets: 8 Drakes: 4 Elder Dragons: 0 Barons: 1 Rift Heralds: 1 Voidgrubs: 0	36:13; KC wins series 3–0			K/D/A: 7/14/11; Gold: 67.1K; Turrets: 4 Drakes: 1 Elder Dragons: 0 Barons: 1 Rift Heralds: 0 Voidgrubs: 3	

Lower Round 1 Match 4	16 October	Cloud9 KIA	1	–	3	FURIA	Los Angeles, United States
	16:00 (UTC−7)						Riot Games Arena
		K/D/A: 19/10/44; Gold: 80.4K; Turrets: 8 Drakes: 4 Elder Dragons: 1 Barons: 1 Rift Heralds: 0 Voidgrubs: 0	39:52; C9 leads series 1–0			K/D/A: 10/19/23; Gold: 68.6K; Turrets: 2 Drakes: 1 Elder Dragons: 0 Barons: 0 Rift Heralds: 1 Voidgrubs: 3	
		K/D/A: 9/12/11; Gold: 62.7K; Turrets: 5 Drakes: 2 Elder Dragons: 0 Barons: 0 Rift Heralds: 1 Voidgrubs: 3	35:15; Series tied 1–1			K/D/A: 12/9/26; Gold: 67.6K; Turrets: 7 Drakes: 3 Elder Dragons: 0 Barons: 2 Rift Heralds: 0 Voidgrubs: 0	
		K/D/A: 6/14/10; Gold: 61.1K; Turrets: 4 Drakes: 3 Elder Dragons: 0 Barons: 0 Rift Heralds: 0 Voidgrubs: 0	34:09; FUR leads series 2–1			K/D/A: 14/6/44; Gold: 72.3K; Turrets: 10; Drakes: 2 Elder Dragons: 0 Barons: 2 Rift Heralds: 1 Voidgrubs: 3	
		K/D/A: 7/16/16; Gold: 48.1K; Turrets: 2 Drakes: 2 Elder Dragons: 0 Barons: 0 Rift Heralds: 0 Voidgrubs: 3	28:36; FUR wins series 3–1			K/D/A: 16/7/33; Gold: 60.8K; Turrets: 9 Drakes: 2 Elder Dragons: 0 Barons: 1 Rift Heralds: 1 Voidgrubs: 0	

Lower Round 2 Match 5	17 October	MVK Esports	3	–	1	FURIA	Los Angeles, United States
	11:00 (UTC−7)						Riot Games Arena
		K/D/A: 21/8/60; Gold: 64.4K; Turrets: 8 Drakes: 4 Elder Dragons: 0 Barons: 0 Rift Heralds: 1 Voidgrubs: 3	31:07; MVK leads series 1–0			K/D/A: 8/21/20; Gold: 54.4K; Turrets: 1 Drakes: 0 Elder Dragons: 0 Barons: 1 Rift Heralds: 0 Voidgrubs: 0	
		K/D/A: 18/7/37; Gold: 60.5K; Turrets: 10; Drakes: 2 Elder Dragons: 0 Barons: 1 Rift Heralds: 1 Voidgrubs: 3	27:24; MVK leads series 2–0			K/D/A: 7/18/15; Gold: 47.0K; Turrets: 0 Drakes: 2 Elder Dragons: 0 Barons: 0 Rift Heralds: 0 Voidgrubs: 0	
		K/D/A: 8/21/15; Gold: 64.6K; Turrets: 3 Drakes: 3 Elder Dragons: 0 Barons: 0 Rift Heralds: 1 Voidgrubs: 3	36:15; MVK leads series 2–1			K/D/A: 21/8/42; Gold: 75.1K; Turrets: 9 Drakes: 2 Elder Dragons: 0 Barons: 1 Rift Heralds: 0 Voidgrubs: 0	
		K/D/A: 21/8/48; Gold: 61.0K; Turrets: 7 Drakes: 2 Elder Dragons: 0 Barons: 1 Rift Heralds: 1 Voidgrubs: 2	28:09; MVK wins series 3–1			K/D/A: 8/21/17; Gold: 49.1K; Turrets: 1 Drakes: 1 Elder Dragons: 0 Barons: 0 Rift Heralds: 0 Voidgrubs: 1	

Qualification match Match 6	18 October	Karmine Corp	3	–	0	MVK Esports	Los Angeles, United States
	11:00 (UTC−7)						Riot Games Arena
		K/D/A: 13/2/24; Gold: 58.5K; Turrets: 9 Drakes: 2 Elder Dragons: 0 Barons: 0 Rift Heralds: 1 Voidgrubs: 0	28:28; KC leads series 1–0			K/D/A: 2/13/1; Gold: 47.1K; Turrets: 2 Drakes: 1 Elder Dragons: 0 Barons: 0 Rift Heralds: 1 Voidgrubs: 3	
		K/D/A: 17/6/24; Gold: 61.1K; Turrets: 9 Drakes: 2 Elder Dragons: 0 Barons: 1 Rift Heralds: 1 Voidgrubs: 3	27:26; KC leads series 2–0			K/D/A: 4/17/5; Gold: 45.5K; Turrets: 1 Drakes: 2 Elder Dragons: 0 Barons: 0 Rift Heralds: 0 Voidgrubs: 0	
		K/D/A: 25/12/34; Gold: 59.9K; Turrets: 9 Drakes: 2 Elder Dragons: 0 Barons: 1 Rift Heralds: 1 Voidgrubs: 0	26:51; KC wins series 3–0			K/D/A: 12/25/19; Gold: 47.5K; Turrets: 2 Drakes: 1 Elder Dragons: 0 Barons: 0 Rift Heralds: 0 Voidgrubs: 3	

== Swiss stage ==
The Swiss stage was held from 23–31 October at the Credit Union of Texas Event Center in Allen, Texas, a suburb of the Dallas–Fort Worth metroplex. Matches started on the following times (UTC-5):

- 23–26 & 31 October: 12:00 CDT (17:00 UTC)
- 28–30 October: 15:00 CDT (20:00 UTC)

Sixteen teams competed in a Swiss-system format over five rounds. Teams that achieve three wins advanced to the knockout stage, while those with three losses were eliminated. In the first two rounds, all games were best-of-ones, while succeeding rounds had all matches as best-of-threes, except for the 1–1 matches.

=== Draw ===
A draw took place after every round to determine each team's next opponent. For the first round, teams were drawn based on seeding, but were drawn based on record for succeeding rounds. Teams were divided into the following pools for the first swiss stage draw:

Pool 1

- Gen.G
- Anyone's Legend
- Team Liquid Alienware
- G2 Esports

Pool 2

- Team Secret Whales
- LØS
- Hanwha Life Esports
- Bilibili Gaming

Pool 3

- LYON
- Movistar KOI
- T1
- Top Esports

Pool 4

- CTBC Flying Oyster
- Invictus Gaming
- Dplus KIA
- Karmine Corp

In the first round, no two teams from the same region could face each other, while for succeeding rounds, teams cannot rematch against each other but could be paired with a team from the same region. The winner of the play-in stage will be assigned to Pool 4.

=== Bracket ===
Advance to knockouts
2–0	Dplus KIA
1–0	Gen.G	2	Gen.G
0–0	Dplus KIA	1	LYON	1	Advance to knockouts
Gen.G	1	T1	0	Dplus KIA	2	2–1	T1
Invictus Gaming	0	CTBC Flying Oyster	0	Movistar KOI	0	Top Esports	2	Invictus Gaming
Team Liquid Alienware	0	Movistar KOI	1	Bilibili Gaming	1	Top Esports
CTBC Flying Oyster	1	Hanwha Life Esports	0	1–1	Invictus Gaming	2	Advance to knockouts
Anyone's Legend	0	Gen.G	1	Top Esports	1	LYON	1	2–2	Karmine Corp
Karmine Corp	1	LYON	1	G2 Esports	0	Movistar KOI	0	LØS	1	LYON
G2 Esports	0	Karmine Corp	0	Hanwha Life Esports	0	T1	2	LYON	2	Bilibili Gaming
Dplus KIA	1	Invictus Gaming	1	Karmine Corp	2
Hanwha Life Esports	1	0–1	Karmine Corp	0	1–2	Movistar KOI	0	Eliminated
Top Esports	0	G2 Esports	1	Bilibili Gaming	1	Karmine Corp	2	Hanwha Life Esports	0	Movistar KOI
LØS	0	LØS	0	T1	1	CTBC Flying Oyster	0	Bilibili Gaming	2	LØS
T1	1	Invictus Gaming	1	CTBC Flying Oyster	0	Team Liquid Alienware	1	Hanwha Life Esports
Team Secret Whales	0	Team Secret Whales	0	LØS	2	Eliminated
LYON	1	Top Esports	1	0–2	Hanwha Life Esports	2	CTBC Flying Oyster
Bilibili Gaming	0	Anyone's Legend	0	LØS	2	G2 Esports	0	Team Liquid Alienware
Movistar KOI	1	Team Liquid Alienware	0	Team Secret Whales	0	G2 Esports
Bilibili Gaming	1	Anyone's Legend	0	Eliminated
Team Liquid Alienware	2	Team Secret Whales
Anyone's Legend

Source: LoL Esports

=== Round 1 ===
0–0; Match 7	23 October	Gen.G	1	–	0	Invictus Gaming	Dallas, United States
	12:00 (UTC−5)						Credit Union of Texas Event Center
		K/D/A: 22/10/58; Gold: 59.2K; Turrets: 9 Drakes: 4 Elder Dragons: 0 Barons: 1 Rift Heralds: 0 Voidgrubs: 1	26:01; GEN wins 1–0			K/D/A: 10/22/31; Gold: 45.8K; Turrets: 2 Drakes: 0 Elder Dragons: 0 Barons: 0 Rift Heralds: 1 Voidgrubs: 2	

0–0; Match 8	23 October	Hanwha Life Esports	1	–	0	Top Esports	Dallas, United States
	13:00 (UTC−5)						Credit Union of Texas Event Center
		K/D/A: 24/7/64; Gold: 53.5K; Turrets: 9 Drakes: 2 Elder Dragons: 0 Barons: 1 Rift Heralds: 1 Voidgrubs: 0	23:51; HLE wins 1–0			K/D/A: 7/24/15; Gold: 37.8K; Turrets: 0 Drakes: 1 Elder Dragons: 0 Barons: 0 Rift Heralds: 0 Voidgrubs: 3	

0–0; Match 9	23 October	Bilibili Gaming	0	–	1	Movistar KOI	Dallas, United States
	14:00 (UTC−5)						Credit Union of Texas Event Center
		K/D/A: 14/18/38; Gold: 68.7K; Turrets: 3 Drakes: 0 Elder Dragons: 1 Barons: 0 Rift Heralds: 1 Voidgrubs: 0	38:41; MKOI wins 1–0			K/D/A: 18/14/50; Gold: 76.2K; Turrets: 11; Drakes: 4 Elder Dragons: 0 Barons: 2 Rift Heralds: 0 Voidgrubs: 3	

0–0; Match 10	23 October	Anyone's Legend	0	–	1	Karmine Corp	Dallas, United States
	15:00 (UTC−5)						Credit Union of Texas Event Center
		K/D/A: 4/12/10; Gold: 56.7K; Turrets: 3 Drakes: 2 Elder Dragons: 0 Barons: 0 Rift Heralds: 1 Voidgrubs: 3	33:16; KC wins 1–0			K/D/A: 12/4/36; Gold: 64.8K; Turrets: 8 Drakes: 3 Elder Dragons: 0 Barons: 2 Rift Heralds: 0 Voidgrubs: 0	

0–0; Match 11	23 October	G2 Esports	0	–	1	Dplus KIA	Dallas, United States
	16:00 (UTC−5)						Credit Union of Texas Event Center
		K/D/A: 8/8/19; Gold: 57.5K; Turrets: 3 Drakes: 3 Elder Dragons: 0 Barons: 1 Rift Heralds: 1 Voidgrubs: 1	32:38; DK wins 1–0			K/D/A: 8/8/24; Gold: 60.9K; Turrets: 8 Drakes: 2 Elder Dragons: 0 Barons: 0 Rift Heralds: 0 Voidgrubs: 2	

0–0; Match 12	23 October	Team Liquid Alienware	0	–	1	CTBC Flying Oyster	Dallas, United States
	17:00 (UTC−5)						Credit Union of Texas Event Center
		K/D/A: 11/12/33; Gold: 65.4K; Turrets: 3 Drakes: 1 Elder Dragons: 0 Barons: 0 Rift Heralds: 0 Voidgrubs: 3	37:32; CFO wins 1–0			K/D/A: 12/11/33; Gold: 74.2K; Turrets: 8 Drakes: 4 Elder Dragons: 1 Barons: 1 Rift Heralds: 1 Voidgrubs: 0	

0–0; Match 13	23 October	LØS	0	–	1	T1	Dallas, United States
	18:00 (UTC−5)						Credit Union of Texas Event Center
		K/D/A: 3/19/9; Gold: 41.4K; Turrets: 0 Drakes: 0 Elder Dragons: 0 Barons: 0 Rift Heralds: 1 Voidgrubs: 0	24:26; T1 wins 1–0			K/D/A: 19/3/46; Gold: 55.2K; Turrets: 10; Drakes: 3 Elder Dragons: 0 Barons: 1 Rift Heralds: 0 Voidgrubs: 3	

0–0; Match 14	23 October	Team Secret Whales	0	–	1	LYON	Dallas, United States
	19:00 (UTC−5)						Credit Union of Texas Event Center
		K/D/A: 6/22/12; Gold: 46.3K; Turrets: 1 Drakes: 1 Elder Dragons: 0 Barons: 0 Rift Heralds: 0 Voidgrubs: 0	26:49; LYON wins 1–0			K/D/A: 22/6/53; Gold: 57.7K; Turrets: 9 Drakes: 2 Elder Dragons: 0 Barons: 1 Rift Heralds: 1 Voidgrubs: 3	

=== Round 2 ===
0–1; Match 15	24 October	Top Esports	1	–	0	Anyone's Legend	Dallas, United States
	12:00 (UTC−5)						Credit Union of Texas Event Center
		K/D/A: 18/9/42; Gold: 62.5K; Turrets: 8 Drakes: 3 Elder Dragons: 0 Barons: 1 Rift Heralds: 0 Voidgrubs: 1	30:18; TES wins 1–0			K/D/A: 9/18/21; Gold: 53.0K; Turrets: 1 Drakes: 2 Elder Dragons: 0 Barons: 0 Rift Heralds: 1 Voidgrubs: 2	

1–0; Match 16	24 October	CTBC Flying Oyster	0	–	1	Movistar KOI	Dallas, United States
	13:00 (UTC−5)						Credit Union of Texas Event Center
		K/D/A: 7/19/10; Gold: 57.7K; Turrets: 2 Drakes: 0 Elder Dragons: 0 Barons: 1 Rift Heralds: 1 Voidgrubs: 0	33:08; MKOI wins 1–0			K/D/A: 19/7/46; Gold: 71.7K; Turrets: 9 Drakes: 4 Elder Dragons: 0 Barons: 1 Rift Heralds: 0 Voidgrubs: 3	

0–1; Match 17	24 October	G2 Esports	1	–	0	LØS	Dallas, United States
	14:00 (UTC−5)						Credit Union of Texas Event Center
		K/D/A: 22/9/44; Gold: 76.6K; Turrets: 7 Drakes: 4 Elder Dragons: 1 Barons: 1 Rift Heralds: 1 Voidgrubs: 0	38:56; G2 wins 1–0			K/D/A: 9/22/19; Gold: 69.1K; Turrets: 5 Drakes: 1 Elder Dragons: 0 Barons: 0 Rift Heralds: 0 Voidgrubs: 3	

1–0; Match 18	24 October	LYON	1	–	0	Karmine Corp	Dallas, United States
	15:00 (UTC−5)						Credit Union of Texas Event Center
		K/D/A: 15/15/50; Gold: 71.4K; Turrets: 8 Drakes: 3 Elder Dragons: 0 Barons: 1 Rift Heralds: 0 Voidgrubs: 3	37:32; LYON wins 1–0			K/D/A: 15/15/43; Gold: 69.1K; Turrets: 5 Drakes: 3 Elder Dragons: 0 Barons: 0 Rift Heralds: 1 Voidgrubs: 0	

0–1; Match 19	24 October	Invictus Gaming	1	–	0	Team Secret Whales	Dallas, United States
	16:00 (UTC−5)						Credit Union of Texas Event Center
		K/D/A: 21/12/53; Gold: 62.7K; Turrets: 9 Drakes: 3 Elder Dragons: 0 Barons: 1 Rift Heralds: 0 Voidgrubs: 2	30:20; IG wins 1–0			K/D/A: 12/21/22; Gold: 53.4K; Turrets: 3 Drakes: 1 Elder Dragons: 0 Barons: 0 Rift Heralds: 1 Voidgrubs: 1	

1–0; Match 20	24 October	Hanwha Life Esports	0	–	1	Gen.G	Dallas, United States
	17:00 (UTC−5)						Credit Union of Texas Event Center
		K/D/A: 7/23/16; Gold: 48.6K; Turrets: 2 Drakes: 0 Elder Dragons: 0 Barons: 0 Rift Heralds: 0 Voidgrubs: 1	29:01; GEN wins 1–0			K/D/A: 22/7/55; Gold: 65.0K; Turrets: 11; Drakes: 4 Elder Dragons: 0 Barons: 1 Rift Heralds: 1 Voidgrubs: 2	

1–0; Match 21	24 October	Dplus KIA	1	–	0	T1	Dallas, United States
	18:00 (UTC−5)						Credit Union of Texas Event Center
		K/D/A: 10/8/22; Gold: 84.3K; Turrets: 9 Drakes: 1 Elder Dragons: 1 Barons: 1 Rift Heralds: 1 Voidgrubs: 2	41:30; DK wins 1–0			K/D/A: 8/10/17; Gold: 79.3K; Turrets: 6 Drakes: 4 Elder Dragons: 0 Barons: 1 Rift Heralds: 0 Voidgrubs: 1	

0–1; Match 22	24 October	Team Liquid Alienware	0	–	1	Bilibili Gaming	Dallas, United States
	19:00 (UTC−5)						Credit Union of Texas Event Center
		K/D/A: 2/17/6; Gold: 52.7K; Turrets: 2 Drakes: 1 Elder Dragons: 0 Barons: 0 Rift Heralds: 0 Voidgrubs: 0	31:35; BLG wins 1–0			K/D/A: 17/2/37; Gold: 67.4K; Turrets: 11; Drakes: 3 Elder Dragons: 0 Barons: 1 Rift Heralds: 1 Voidgrubs: 3	

=== Round 3 ===
All 2–0 and 0–2 matches are best-of-threes, while 1–1 matches remain best-of-ones. Before the start of the opening series of the fourth day of Swiss and the second day of round 3 on 26 October, a moment of silence was observed for the passing of Lauri "Cyanide" Happonen, the jungler who won the 2011 League of Legends World Championship with Fnatic.

1–1; Match 23	25 October	Hanwha Life Esports	0	–	1	Invictus Gaming	Dallas, United States
	12:00 (UTC−5)						Credit Union of Texas Event Center
		K/D/A: 9/29/16; Gold: 51.1K; Turrets: 3 Drakes: 0 Elder Dragons: 0 Barons: 1 Rift Heralds: 1 Voidgrubs: 1	28:36; IG wins 1–0			K/D/A: 29/9/73; Gold: 60.4K; Turrets: 7 Drakes: 4 Elder Dragons: 0 Barons: 0 Rift Heralds: 0 Voidgrubs: 2	

1–1; Match 24	25 October	Top Esports	1	–	0	G2 Esports	Dallas, United States
	13:00 (UTC−5)						Credit Union of Texas Event Center
		K/D/A: 18/6/48; Gold: 72.6K; Turrets: 10; Drakes: 3 Elder Dragons: 0 Barons: 2 Rift Heralds: 0 Voidgrubs: 0	35:44; TES wins 1–0			K/D/A: 6/18/15; Gold: 61.8K; Turrets: 3 Drakes: 2 Elder Dragons: 0 Barons: 0 Rift Heralds: 1 Voidgrubs: 3	

2–0; Match 25	25 October	Dplus KIA	2	–	0	Movistar KOI	Dallas, United States
	14:00 (UTC−5)						Credit Union of Texas Event Center
		K/D/A: 16/8/40; Gold: 79.8K; Turrets: 9 Drakes: 2 Elder Dragons: 0 Barons: 2 Rift Heralds: 1 Voidgrubs: 1	39:20; DK leads series 1–0			K/D/A: 8/16/24; Gold: 69.7K; Turrets: 2 Drakes: 3 Elder Dragons: 0 Barons: 0 Rift Heralds: 0 Voidgrubs: 2	
		K/D/A: 17/5/32; Gold: 56.8K; Turrets: 9 Drakes: 3 Elder Dragons: 0 Barons: 1 Rift Heralds: 0 Voidgrubs: 3	25:10; DK wins series 2–0			K/D/A: 5/17/8; Gold: 43.7K; Turrets: 1 Drakes: 0 Elder Dragons: 0 Barons: 0 Rift Heralds: 1 Voidgrubs: 0	

2–0; Match 26	25 October	Gen.G	2	–	1	LYON	Dallas, United States
	17:00 (UTC−5)						Credit Union of Texas Event Center
		K/D/A: 4/10/9; Gold: 59.8K; Turrets: 3 Drakes: 2 Elder Dragons: 0 Barons: 0 Rift Heralds: 0 Voidgrubs: 0	35:45; LYON leads series 1–0			K/D/A: 10/4/29; Gold: 66.7K; Turrets: 9 Drakes: 3 Elder Dragons: 0 Barons: 2 Rift Heralds: 1 Voidgrubs: 3	
		K/D/A: 16/9/47; Gold: 56.9K; Turrets: 9 Drakes: 4 Elder Dragons: 0 Barons: 1 Rift Heralds: 1 Voidgrubs: 3	26:32; Series tied 1–1			K/D/A: 9/16/24; Gold: 47.3K; Turrets: 1 Drakes: 0 Elder Dragons: 0 Barons: 0 Rift Heralds: 0 Voidgrubs: 0	
		K/D/A: 15/7/40; Gold: 66.3K; Turrets: 7 Drakes: 3 Elder Dragons: 0 Barons: 0 Rift Heralds: 1 Voidgrubs: 0	31:57; GEN wins series 2–1			K/D/A: 7/15/16; Gold: 56.3K; Turrets: 3 Drakes: 2 Elder Dragons: 0 Barons: 0 Rift Heralds: 0 Voidgrubs: 3	

1–1; Match 27	26 October	T1	1	–	0	CTBC Flying Oyster	Dallas, United States
	12:00 (UTC−5)						Credit Union of Texas Event Center
		K/D/A: 14/6/37; Gold: 56.7K; Turrets: 7 Drakes: 1 Elder Dragons: 0 Barons: 1 Rift Heralds: 1 Voidgrubs: 1	27:23; T1 wins 1–0			K/D/A: 6/14/14; Gold: 50.5K; Turrets: 4 Drakes: 2 Elder Dragons: 0 Barons: 0 Rift Heralds: 0 Voidgrubs: 2	

1–1; Match 28	26 October	Karmine Corp	0	–	1	Bilibili Gaming	Dallas, United States
	13:00 (UTC−5)						Credit Union of Texas Event Center
		K/D/A: 11/14/30; Gold: 66.3K; Turrets: 4 Drakes: 3 Elder Dragons: 0 Barons: 0 Rift Heralds: 1 Voidgrubs: 0	36:20; BLG wins 1–0			K/D/A: 14/11/49; Gold: 75.0K; Turrets: 9 Drakes: 3 Elder Dragons: 0 Barons: 1 Rift Heralds: 0 Voidgrubs: 3	

0–2; Match 29	26 October	LØS	2	–	0	Team Secret Whales	Dallas, United States
	14:00 (UTC−5)						Credit Union of Texas Event Center
		K/D/A: 14/9/38; Gold: 78.5K; Turrets: 9 Drakes: 2 Elder Dragons: 0 Barons: 2 Rift Heralds: 0 Voidgrubs: 1	40:04; LOS leads series 1–0			K/D/A: 9/14/16; Gold: 72.9K; Turrets: 6 Drakes: 3 Elder Dragons: 0 Barons: 1 Rift Heralds: 1 Voidgrubs: 2	
		K/D/A: 22/13/60; Gold: 76.6K; Turrets: 9 Drakes: 4 Elder Dragons: 0 Barons: 1 Rift Heralds: 0 Voidgrubs: 2	37:23; LOS wins series 2–0			K/D/A: 13/22/28; Gold: 68.4K; Turrets: 3 Drakes: 2 Elder Dragons: 0 Barons: 1 Rift Heralds: 1 Voidgrubs: 1	

0–2; Match 30	26 October	Anyone's Legend	0	–	2	Team Liquid Alienware	Dallas, United States
	17:00 (UTC−5)						Credit Union of Texas Event Center
		K/D/A: 5/16/13; Gold: 55.5K; Turrets: 2 Drakes: 1 Elder Dragons: 0 Barons: 0 Rift Heralds: 0 Voidgrubs: 3	33:12; TLAW leads series 1–0			K/D/A: 16/5/47; Gold: 69.7K; Turrets: 9 Drakes: 4 Elder Dragons: 0 Barons: 2 Rift Heralds: 1 Voidgrubs: 0	
		K/D/A: 18/18/48; Gold: 82.5K; Turrets: 3 Drakes: 3 Elder Dragons: 0 Barons: 0 Rift Heralds: 0 Voidgrubs: 2	47:29; TLAW wins series 2–0			K/D/A: 17/18/42; Gold: 91.7K; Turrets: 11; Drakes: 4 Elder Dragons: 0 Barons: 2 Rift Heralds: 1 Voidgrubs: 1	

=== Round 4 ===
2–1; Match 31	28 October	Movistar KOI	0	–	2	T1	Dallas, United States
	15:00 (UTC−5)						Credit Union of Texas Event Center
		K/D/A: 10/20/24; Gold: 79.8K; Turrets: 5 Drakes: 3 Elder Dragons: 0 Barons: 1 Rift Heralds: 0 Voidgrubs: 3	40:00; T1 leads series 1–0			K/D/A: 20/10/46; Gold: 82.9K; Turrets: 10; Drakes: 4 Elder Dragons: 0 Barons: 1 Rift Heralds: 1 Voidgrubs: 0	
		K/D/A: 9/22/17; Gold: 45.2K; Turrets: 0 Drakes: 0 Elder Dragons: 0 Barons: 0 Rift Heralds: 0 Voidgrubs: 3	25:43; T1 wins series 2–0			K/D/A: 22/9/51; Gold: 57.5K; Turrets: 9 Drakes: 3 Elder Dragons: 0 Barons: 0 Rift Heralds: 1 Voidgrubs: 0	

2–1; Match 32	28 October	Invictus Gaming	2	–	1	LYON	Dallas, United States
	18:00 (UTC−5)						Credit Union of Texas Event Center
		K/D/A: 19/4/46; Gold: 55.5K; Turrets: 7 Drakes: 4 Elder Dragons: 0 Barons: 0 Rift Heralds: 1 Voidgrubs: 3	27:09; IG leads series 1–0			K/D/A: 4/19/10; Gold: 46.8K; Turrets: 2 Drakes: 0 Elder Dragons: 0 Barons: 0 Rift Heralds: 0 Voidgrubs: 0	
		K/D/A: 8/18/18; Gold: 63.8K; Turrets: 3 Drakes: 3 Elder Dragons: 0 Barons: 0 Rift Heralds: 1 Voidgrubs: 1	38:04; Series tied 1–1			K/D/A: 18/8/29; Gold: 75.5K; Turrets: 10; Drakes: 3 Elder Dragons: 0 Barons: 1 Rift Heralds: 0 Voidgrubs: 2	
		K/D/A: 7/5/18; Gold: 48.1K; Turrets: 9 Drakes: 4 Elder Dragons: 0 Barons: 0 Rift Heralds: 1 Voidgrubs: 0	23:59; IG wins series 2–1			K/D/A: 5/7/7; Gold: 39.6K; Turrets: 1 Drakes: 0 Elder Dragons: 0 Barons: 0 Rift Heralds: 0 Voidgrubs: 3	

1–2; Match 33	29 October	Karmine Corp	2	–	0	CTBC Flying Oyster	Dallas, United States
	15:00 (UTC−5)						Credit Union of Texas Event Center
		K/D/A: 19/3/46; Gold: 59.3K; Turrets: 10; Drakes: 3 Elder Dragons: 0 Barons: 1 Rift Heralds: 1 Voidgrubs: 3	27:35; KC leads series 1–0			K/D/A: 3/19/6; Gold: 43.8K; Turrets: 0 Drakes: 1 Elder Dragons: 0 Barons: 0 Rift Heralds: 0 Voidgrubs: 0	
		K/D/A: 20/12/56; Gold: 75.0K; Turrets: 7 Drakes: 1 Elder Dragons: 1 Barons: 1 Rift Heralds: 0 Voidgrubs: 0	36:54; KC wins series 2–0			K/D/A: 12/20/25; Gold: 68.0K; Turrets: 7 Drakes: 4 Elder Dragons: 0 Barons: 1 Rift Heralds: 1 Voidgrubs: 3	

2–1; Match 34	29 October	Top Esports	2	–	1	Bilibili Gaming	Dallas, United States
	18:00 (UTC−5)						Credit Union of Texas Event Center
		K/D/A: 6/21/11; Gold: 48.9K; Turrets: 1 Drakes: 2 Elder Dragons: 0 Barons: 0 Rift Heralds: 0 Voidgrubs: 0	27:51; BLG leads series 1–0			K/D/A: 21/6/39; Gold: 62.8K; Turrets: 10; Drakes: 2 Elder Dragons: 0 Barons: 1 Rift Heralds: 1 Voidgrubs: 3	
		K/D/A: 13/10/29; Gold: 72.3K; Turrets: 9 Drakes: 2 Elder Dragons: 0 Barons: 1 Rift Heralds: 0 Voidgrubs: 3	37:36; Series tied 1–1			K/D/A: 10/13/22; Gold: 69.2K; Turrets: 6 Drakes: 3 Elder Dragons: 0 Barons: 0 Rift Heralds: 1 Voidgrubs: 0	
		K/D/A: 17/3/45; Gold: 60.4K; Turrets: 11; Drakes: 2 Elder Dragons: 0 Barons: 1 Rift Heralds: 1 Voidgrubs: 3	27:48; TES wins series 2–1			K/D/A: 3/17/5; Gold: 49.1K; Turrets: 2 Drakes: 2 Elder Dragons: 0 Barons: 0 Rift Heralds: 0 Voidgrubs: 0	

1–2; Match 35	30 October	Team Liquid Alienware	1	–	2	LØS	Dallas, United States
	15:00 (UTC−5)						Credit Union of Texas Event Center
		K/D/A: 7/15/15; Gold: 52.0K; Turrets: 3 Drakes: 1 Elder Dragons: 0 Barons: 0 Rift Heralds: 1 Voidgrubs: 0	29:51; LOS leads series 1–0			K/D/A: 15/7/32; Gold: 61.0K; Turrets: 9 Drakes: 3 Elder Dragons: 0 Barons: 2 Rift Heralds: 0 Voidgrubs: 3	
		K/D/A: 15/8/46; Gold: 75.1K; Turrets: 9 Drakes: 4 Elder Dragons: 1 Barons: 1 Rift Heralds: 1 Voidgrubs: 0	38:00; Series tied 1–1			K/D/A: 8/15/23; Gold: 68.0K; Turrets: 5 Drakes: 1 Elder Dragons: 0 Barons: 0 Rift Heralds: 0 Voidgrubs: 3	
		K/D/A: 5/17/15; Gold: 81.6K; Turrets: 6 Drakes: 2 Elder Dragons: 0 Barons: 2 Rift Heralds: 0 Voidgrubs: 2	47:15; LOS wins series 2–1			K/D/A: 17/5/40; Gold: 91.4K; Turrets: 10; Drakes: 4 Elder Dragons: 1 Barons: 1 Rift Heralds: 1 Voidgrubs: 1	

1–2; Match 36	30 October	Hanwha Life Esports	2	–	0	G2 Esports	Dallas, United States
	18:00 (UTC−5)						Credit Union of Texas Event Center
		K/D/A: 22/11/55; Gold: 59.2K; Turrets: 9 Drakes: 3 Elder Dragons: 0 Barons: 1 Rift Heralds: 1 Voidgrubs: 2	28:05; HLE leads series 1–0			K/D/A: 11/22/30; Gold: 49.9K; Turrets: 1 Drakes: 0 Elder Dragons: 0 Barons: 0 Rift Heralds: 0 Voidgrubs: 1	
		K/D/A: 19/8/40; Gold: 54.0K; Turrets: 6 Drakes: 4 Elder Dragons: 0 Barons: 1 Rift Heralds: 1 Voidgrubs: 2	26:12; HLE wins series 2–0			K/D/A: 7/19/12; Gold: 47.0K; Turrets: 3 Drakes: 0 Elder Dragons: 0 Barons: 0 Rift Heralds: 0 Voidgrubs: 1	

=== Round 5 ===
2–2; Match 37	31 October	Karmine Corp	2	–	0	Movistar KOI	Dallas, United States
	12:00 (UTC−5)						Credit Union of Texas Event Center
		K/D/A: 13/14/40; Gold: 76.9K; Turrets: 8 Drakes: 4 Elder Dragons: 1 Barons: 2 Rift Heralds: 1 Voidgrubs: 3	40:02; KC leads series 1–0			K/D/A: 14/13/37; Gold: 73.6K; Turrets: 5 Drakes: 0 Elder Dragons: 1 Barons: 0 Rift Heralds: 0 Voidgrubs: 0	
		K/D/A: 18/4/41; Gold: 57.8K; Turrets: 8 Drakes: 3 Elder Dragons: 0 Barons: 1 Rift Heralds: 1 Voidgrubs: 3	26:10; KC wins series 2–0			K/D/A: 4/18/12; Gold: 42.5K; Turrets: 1 Drakes: 0 Elder Dragons: 0 Barons: 0 Rift Heralds: 0 Voidgrubs: 0	

2–2; Match 38	31 October	LØS	1	–	2	LYON	Dallas, United States
	15:00 (UTC−5)						Credit Union of Texas Event Center
		K/D/A: 11/8/17; Gold: 68.4K; Turrets: 8 Drakes: 3 Elder Dragons: 0 Barons: 2 Rift Heralds: 0 Voidgrubs: 0	35:06; LOS leads series 1–0			K/D/A: 8/11/12; Gold: 60.5K; Turrets: 1 Drakes: 2 Elder Dragons: 0 Barons: 0 Rift Heralds: 1 Voidgrubs: 3	
		K/D/A: 9/9/15; Gold: 88.2K; Turrets: 7 Drakes: 3 Elder Dragons: 1 Barons: 2 Rift Heralds: 1 Voidgrubs: 2	47:06; Series tied 1–1			K/D/A: 9/9/19; Gold: 85.2K; Turrets: 10; Drakes: 4 Elder Dragons: 0 Barons: 1 Rift Heralds: 0 Voidgrubs: 1	
		K/D/A: 7/17/10; Gold: 66.0K; Turrets: 6 Drakes: 2 Elder Dragons: 0 Barons: 1 Rift Heralds: 0 Voidgrubs: 0	36:42; LYON wins series 2–1			K/D/A: 17/7/45; Gold: 70.4K; Turrets: 9 Drakes: 3 Elder Dragons: 0 Barons: 0 Rift Heralds: 1 Voidgrubs: 3	

2–2; Match 39	31 October	Hanwha Life Esports	0	–	2	Bilibili Gaming	Dallas, United States
	18:00 (UTC−5)						Credit Union of Texas Event Center
		K/D/A: 18/19/57; Gold: 78.9K; Turrets: 8 Drakes: 3 Elder Dragons: 0 Barons: 1 Rift Heralds: 1 Voidgrubs: 3	41:51; BLG leads series 1–0			K/D/A: 19/18/54; Gold: 80.9K; Turrets: 7 Drakes: 4 Elder Dragons: 0 Barons: 0 Rift Heralds: 0 Voidgrubs: 0	
		K/D/A: 3/14/7; Gold: 53.4K; Turrets: 0 Drakes: 1 Elder Dragons: 0 Barons: 0 Rift Heralds: 0 Voidgrubs: 3	32:44; BLG wins series 2–0			K/D/A: 14/3/31; Gold: 67.7K; Turrets: 10; Drakes: 4 Elder Dragons: 0 Barons: 1 Rift Heralds: 1 Voidgrubs: 0	

== Knockout stage ==
The quarterfinals and semifinals took place from 3–8 November at the Credit Union of Texas Event Center in Allen, Texas, a suburb of the Dallas–Fort Worth metroplex. Matches started at 16:00 CST (22:00 UTC). After the conclusion of the Swiss stage, a draw was conducted to determine the quarterfinal matches, where two teams that finished the Swiss stage with a 3–0 record were placed on opposite sides of the bracket and faced teams with a 3–2 record in the quarterfinals, while all remaining teams were seeded randomly.

New York City hosted the final on 14 November at 14:00 EST (19:00 UTC) at the Barclays Center in Brooklyn.

=== Qualified teams ===
Karmine Corp's qualification marked the first knockout stage appearance for a French-based organization since Against All Authority in 2011 and the second consecutive appearance for the League of Legends EMEA Championship (LEC). LYON of the League Championship Series (LCS) also secured its first-ever Worlds playoff qualification, the first time that an LCS team qualified for the playoffs in a North America-hosted World Championship since the 2016 edition with Cloud9. With the qualification of KC and LYON, this was the first time since 2021 that two Western teams had made the quarterfinals.

Invictus Gaming of the League of Legends Pro League (LPL) also made its return to the knockout stage after making the semifinals in 2019, and the first playoff appearance for Dplus KIA of the League of Legends Champions Korea (LCK) since the 2022 edition, also held in the United States.

Eight teams qualified for the playoff portion of the tournament from the Swiss stage:

Pools	Teams
Pool 1 (3–0)	Dplus KIA
Pool 1 (3–0)	Gen.G
Pool 2 (3–1)	T1
Pool 2 (3–1)	Invictus Gaming
Pool 2 (3–1)	Top Esports
Pool 3 (3–2)	Karmine Corp
Pool 3 (3–2)	LYON
Pool 3 (3–2)	Bilibili Gaming

=== Bracket ===
Quarterfinals
3 November, 16:00 CST – Dallas
Top Esports	1
Invictus Gaming	3
4 November, 16:00 CST – Dallas
Gen.G	3
LYON	0
5 November, 16:00 CST – Dallas
Dplus KIA	0
Bilibili Gaming	3
6 November, 16:00 CST – Dallas
Karmine Corp	1
T1	3

Semifinals
7 November, 16:00 CST – Dallas
Invictus Gaming	0
Gen.G	3
8 November, 16:00 CST – Dallas
Bilibili Gaming	3
T1	1

Final
14 November, 14:00 EST – New York City
Gen.G	1
Bilibili Gaming	3

Source: LoL Esports

=== Quarterfinals ===
Match 40	3 November	Top Esports	1	–	3	Invictus Gaming	Dallas, United States
	16:00 (UTC−6)						Credit Union of Texas Event Center
		K/D/A: 12/27/24; Gold: 52.8K; Turrets: 2 Drakes: 1 Elder Dragons: 0 Barons: 0 Rift Heralds: 1 Voidgrubs: 1	31:02; IG leads series 1–0			K/D/A: 27/12/67; Gold: 68.0K; Turrets: 9 Drakes: 4 Elder Dragons: 0 Barons: 1 Rift Heralds: 0 Voidgrubs: 2	
		K/D/A: 20/17/49; Gold: 91.7K; Turrets: 11; Drakes: 3 Elder Dragons: 0 Barons: 3 Rift Heralds: 1 Voidgrubs: 0	47:08; Series tied 1–1			K/D/A: 17/20/35; Gold: 85.1K; Turrets: 4 Drakes: 4 Elder Dragons: 0 Barons: 0 Rift Heralds: 0 Voidgrubs: 3	
		K/D/A: 9/16/21; Gold: 53.3K; Turrets: 4 Drakes: 1 Elder Dragons: 0 Barons: 0 Rift Heralds: 0 Voidgrubs: 2	29:29; IG leads series 2–1			K/D/A: 16/9/39; Gold: 62.5K; Turrets: 9 Drakes: 3 Elder Dragons: 0 Barons: 1 Rift Heralds: 1 Voidgrubs: 1	
		K/D/A: 10/16/23; Gold: 55.4K; Turrets: 0 Drakes: 1 Elder Dragons: 0 Barons: 0 Rift Heralds: 0 Voidgrubs: 0	30:58; IG wins series 3–1			K/D/A: 16/10/33; Gold: 61.7K; Turrets: 8 Drakes: 4 Elder Dragons: 0 Barons: 1 Rift Heralds: 1 Voidgrubs: 3	

Match 41	4 November	Gen.G	3	–	0	LYON	Dallas, United States
	16:00 (UTC−6)						Credit Union of Texas Event Center
		K/D/A: 19/8/38; Gold: 70.9K; Turrets: 12; Drakes: 4 Elder Dragons: 0 Barons: 2 Rift Heralds: 1 Voidgrubs: 0	32:13; GEN leads series 1–0			K/D/A: 8/19/15; Gold: 58.0K; Turrets: 3 Drakes: 1 Elder Dragons: 0 Barons: 0 Rift Heralds: 0 Voidgrubs: 3	
		K/D/A: 22/6/51; Gold: 60.6K; Turrets: 10; Drakes: 2 Elder Dragons: 0 Barons: 1 Rift Heralds: 0 Voidgrubs: 2	26:32; GEN leads series 2–0			K/D/A: 6/22/12; Gold: 47.7K; Turrets: 2 Drakes: 2 Elder Dragons: 0 Barons: 0 Rift Heralds: 1 Voidgrubs: 1	
		K/D/A: 16/10/38; Gold: 69.6K; Turrets: 9 Drakes: 2 Elder Dragons: 0 Barons: 1 Rift Heralds: 1 Voidgrubs: 3	33:29; GEN wins series 3–0			K/D/A: 10/16/25; Gold: 58.7K; Turrets: 1 Drakes: 3 Elder Dragons: 0 Barons: 0 Rift Heralds: 0 Voidgrubs: 0	

Match 42	5 November	Dplus KIA	0	–	3	Bilibili Gaming	Dallas, United States
	16:00 (UTC−6)						Credit Union of Texas Event Center
		K/D/A: 9/24/19; Gold: 63.6K; Turrets: 3 Drakes: 0 Elder Dragons: 0 Barons: 0 Rift Heralds: 0 Voidgrubs: 2	33:20; BLG leads series 1–0			K/D/A: 24/10/53; Gold: 72.4K; Turrets: 11; Drakes: 4 Elder Dragons: 1 Barons: 2 Rift Heralds: 1 Voidgrubs: 1	
		K/D/A: 10/13/31; Gold: 57.9K; Turrets: 2 Drakes: 0 Elder Dragons: 0 Barons: 0 Rift Heralds: 0 Voidgrubs: 3	32:11; BLG leads series 1–0			K/D/A: 13/10/30; Gold: 64.1K; Turrets: 8 Drakes: 4 Elder Dragons: 1 Barons: 0 Rift Heralds: 1 Voidgrubs: 0	
		K/D/A: 9/25/19; Gold: 57.6K; Turrets: 3 Drakes: 1 Elder Dragons: 0 Barons: 0 Rift Heralds: 1 Voidgrubs: 0	32:36; BLG wins series 3–0			K/D/A: 25/9/52; Gold: 67.7K; Turrets: 9 Drakes: 4 Elder Dragons: 0 Barons: 2 Rift Heralds: 0 Voidgrubs: 3	

Match 43	6 November	Karmine Corp	1	–	3	T1	Dallas, United States
	16:00 (UTC−6)						Credit Union of Texas Event Center
		K/D/A: 7/23/13; Gold: 65.5K; Turrets: 2 Drakes: 2 Elder Dragons: 0 Barons: 0 Rift Heralds: 0 Voidgrubs: 2	35:38; T1 leads series 1–0			K/D/A: 23/7/57; Gold: 78.8K; Turrets: 11; Drakes: 3 Elder Dragons: 0 Barons: 2 Rift Heralds: 1 Voidgrubs: 1	
		K/D/A: 9/20/21; Gold: 55.9K; Turrets: 2 Drakes: 1 Elder Dragons: 0 Barons: 0 Rift Heralds: 0 Voidgrubs: 0	29:42; T1 leads series 2–0			K/D/A: 20/9/52; Gold: 65.2K; Turrets: 9 Drakes: 4 Elder Dragons: 0 Barons: 1 Rift Heralds: 1 Voidgrubs: 3	
		K/D/A: 8/6/17; Gold: 70.4K; Turrets: 8 Drakes: 4 Elder Dragons: 1 Barons: 2 Rift Heralds: 0 Voidgrubs: 2	36:44; T1 leads series 2–1			K/D/A: 6/8/16; Gold: 66.4K; Turrets: 6 Drakes: 1 Elder Dragons: 0 Barons: 0 Rift Heralds: 1 Voidgrubs: 1	
		K/D/A: 8/17/15; Gold: 63.6K; Turrets: 5 Drakes: 2 Elder Dragons: 0 Barons: 0 Rift Heralds: 1 Voidgrubs: 1	35:15; T1 wins series 3–1			K/D/A: 17/8/46; Gold: 73.2K; Turrets: 10; Drakes: 4 Elder Dragons: 0 Barons: 2 Rift Heralds: 0 Voidgrubs: 2	

=== Semifinals ===
Match 44	7 November	Invictus Gaming	0	–	3	Gen.G	Dallas, United States
	16:00 (UTC−6)						Credit Union of Texas Event Center
		K/D/A: 9/29/14; Gold: 58.6K; Turrets: 3 Drakes: 1 Elder Dragons: 0 Barons: 0 Rift Heralds: 0 Voidgrubs: 2	33:38; GEN leads series 1–0			K/D/A: 29/9/65; Gold: 73.3K; Turrets: 9 Drakes: 4 Elder Dragons: 0 Barons: 1 Rift Heralds: 1 Voidgrubs: 1	
		K/D/A: 9/27/23; Gold: 49.3K; Turrets: 1 Drakes: 1 Elder Dragons: 0 Barons: 0 Rift Heralds: 0 Voidgrubs: 3	29:16; GEN leads series 2–0			K/D/A: 26/9/63; Gold: 63.8K; Turrets: 9 Drakes: 4 Elder Dragons: 0 Barons: 1 Rift Heralds: 0 Voidgrubs: 0	
		K/D/A: 18/16/43; Gold: 71.7K; Turrets: 5 Drakes: 4 Elder Dragons: 0 Barons: 0 Rift Heralds: 1 Voidgrubs: 2	40:08; GEN wins series 3–0			K/D/A: 16/18/43; Gold: 78.2K; Turrets: 9 Drakes: 2 Elder Dragons: 0 Barons: 1 Rift Heralds: 0 Voidgrubs: 1	

Match 45	8 November	Bilibili Gaming	3	–	1	T1	Dallas, United States
	16:00 (UTC−6)						Credit Union of Texas Event Center
		K/D/A: 18/6/52; Gold: 62.0K; Turrets: 10; Drakes: 3 Elder Dragons: 0 Barons: 1 Rift Heralds: 1 Voidgrubs: 3	30:24; BLG leads series 1–0			K/D/A: 6/18/17; Gold: 54.2K; Turrets: 3 Drakes: 1 Elder Dragons: 0 Barons: 0 Rift Heralds: 0 Voidgrubs: 0	
		K/D/A: 10/22/16; Gold: 60.2K; Turrets: 2 Drakes: 0 Elder Dragons: 0 Barons: 0 Rift Heralds: 0 Voidgrubs: 0	32:14; Series tied 1–1			K/D/A: 22/10/54; Gold: 70.0K; Turrets: 10; Drakes: 4 Elder Dragons: 1 Barons: 2 Rift Heralds: 1 Voidgrubs: 3	
		K/D/A: 19/10/44; Gold: 77.6K; Turrets: 11; Drakes: 4 Elder Dragons: 0 Barons: 2 Rift Heralds: 1 Voidgrubs: 3	36:58; BLG leads series 2–1			K/D/A: 10/19/29; Gold: 68.2K; Turrets: 4 Drakes: 2 Elder Dragons: 0 Barons: 0 Rift Heralds: 0 Voidgrubs: 0	
		K/D/A: 21/9/58; Gold: 77.7K; Turrets: 9 Drakes: 4 Elder Dragons: 0 Barons: 1 Rift Heralds: 1 Voidgrubs: 2	37:47; BLG wins series 3–1			K/D/A: 9/21/23; Gold: 68.8K; Turrets: 4 Drakes: 2 Elder Dragons: 0 Barons: 1 Rift Heralds: 0 Voidgrubs: 1	

=== Final ===
Match 46	14 November	Gen.G	1	–	3	Bilibili Gaming	New York City, United States
	14:00 (UTC−5)						Barclays Center
		K/D/A: 19/4/61; Gold: 80.0K; Turrets: 9 Drakes: 0 Elder Dragons: 1 Barons: 3 Rift Heralds: 0 Voidgrubs: 2	38:59; GEN leads series 1–0			K/D/A: 4/19/12; Gold: 66.0K; Turrets: 3 Drakes: 4 Elder Dragons: 1 Barons: 0 Rift Heralds: 1 Voidgrubs: 1	
		K/D/A: 14/19/27; Gold: 94.2K; Turrets: 4 Drakes: 3 Elder Dragons: 1 Barons: 1 Rift Heralds: 1 Voidgrubs: 1	53:16; Series tied 1–1			K/D/A: 19/14/50; Gold: 99.5K; Turrets: 11; Drakes: 4 Elder Dragons: 0 Barons: 3 Rift Heralds: 0 Voidgrubs: 2	
		K/D/A: 8/20/16; Gold: 65.7K; Turrets: 4 Drakes: 2 Elder Dragons: 0 Barons: 0 Rift Heralds: 1 Voidgrubs: 0	37:39; BLG leads series 2–1			K/D/A: 20/8/60; Gold: 74.0K; Turrets: 10; Drakes: 4 Elder Dragons: 0 Barons: 1 Rift Heralds: 0 Voidgrubs: 3	
		K/D/A: 11/21/25; Gold: 79.8K; Turrets: 5 Drakes: 4 Elder Dragons: 0 Barons: 1 Rift Heralds: 0 Voidgrubs: 3	42:58; BLG wins series 3–1			K/D/A: 21/11/59; Gold: 89.7K; Turrets: 10; Drakes: 3 Elder Dragons: 0 Barons: 2 Rift Heralds: 1 Voidgrubs: 0	

== Final standings ==
A base prize pool of US$5,000,000 is offered for the tournament.

Place	Team	PI	SS	QF	SF	Finals	Prize (%)	Prize (USD)
1st	Bilibili Gaming	–	3–2	3–0	3–1	3–1	20%	$1,000,000
2nd	Gen.G	–	3–0	3–0	3–0	1–3	16%	$800,000
3rd–4th	T1	–	3–1	3–1	1–3		8%	$400,000
3rd–4th	Invictus Gaming	–	3–1	3–1	0–3		8%	$400,000
5th–8th	Dplus KIA	–	3–0	0–3			6%	$300,000
5th–8th	Top Esports	–	3–1	1–3			6%	$300,000
5th–8th	Karmine Corp	3–0	3–2	1–3			6%	$300,000
5th–8th	LYON	–	3–2	0–3			6%	$300,000
9th–11th	Movistar KOI	–	2–3				3.5%	$175,000
9th–11th	LØS	–	2–3				3.5%	$175,000
9th–11th	Hanwha Life Esports	–	2–3				3.5%	$175,000
12th–14th	CTBC Flying Oyster	–	1–3				2.5%	$125,000
12th–14th	Team Liquid Alienware	–	1–3				2.5%	$125,000
12th–14th	G2 Esports	–	1–3				2.5%	$125,000
15th–16th	Team Secret Whales	–	0–3				1.8%	$90,000
15th–16th	Anyone's Legend	–	0–3				1.8%	$90,000
17th	MVK Esports	2–2					1%	$50,000
18th	FURIA	1–2					0.8%	$40,000
19th	Cloud9 KIA	0–2					0.6%	$30,000

== Marketing ==
=== Official song ===
In a September 29, 2026 post to social media platforms, Riot Games announced that the official anthem for the World Championship, "Know My Name" by True Damage (consisting of vocalists Coco Jones, Sofía Reyes, Soyeon, and Vic Mensa), would be released on October 8. With this, True Damage became the first virtual band and Riot in-house artists to perform the World Championship anthem. (Note: On streaming services, songs from Riot Games titles typically feature the name of the game as the featured artist, however they are not explicitly counted as in-house artists.)

The music video for "Know My Name" was produced by production company WIZZ and Paris-based animation studio CRCR. Released on the same day as the song, the video features the most recent champions T1 and Lee "Faker" Sang-hyeok's journey from his 2017 finals loss to winning three consecutive World Championships in 2023, 2024, and 2025, with appearances in the video from his teammates throughout his tenure at T1.

=== Slogan ===
Revealed alongside a format explainer video, the tournament's slogan is This Is Our Moment.

=== Orchestral theme ===
The tournament's orchestral theme was released on 13 October, two days before the start of the play-in stage. It is a heavy metal instrumental performed by Pentakill.

=== New client announcement ===
Before the commencement of the final, Riot Games announced that a new client and update titled League of Legends: New Dawn would be implemented for the 2027 season, which is set to notably feature upgrades to the game's core engine, visuals and mechanics. Details for the new client is set to be announced in January 2027.

== Sponsorship ==
- Amazon Web Services
- Cisco
- Coinbase
- Esports Foundation (Esports World Cup & Esports Nations Cup)
- Globant
- Golden Dew
- HyperX
- Mastercard
- Opera GX
- Oppo
- Red Bull
- Secretlab
- Uber Eats
- Verizon
