= Riot Games Arena =

Esports arenas

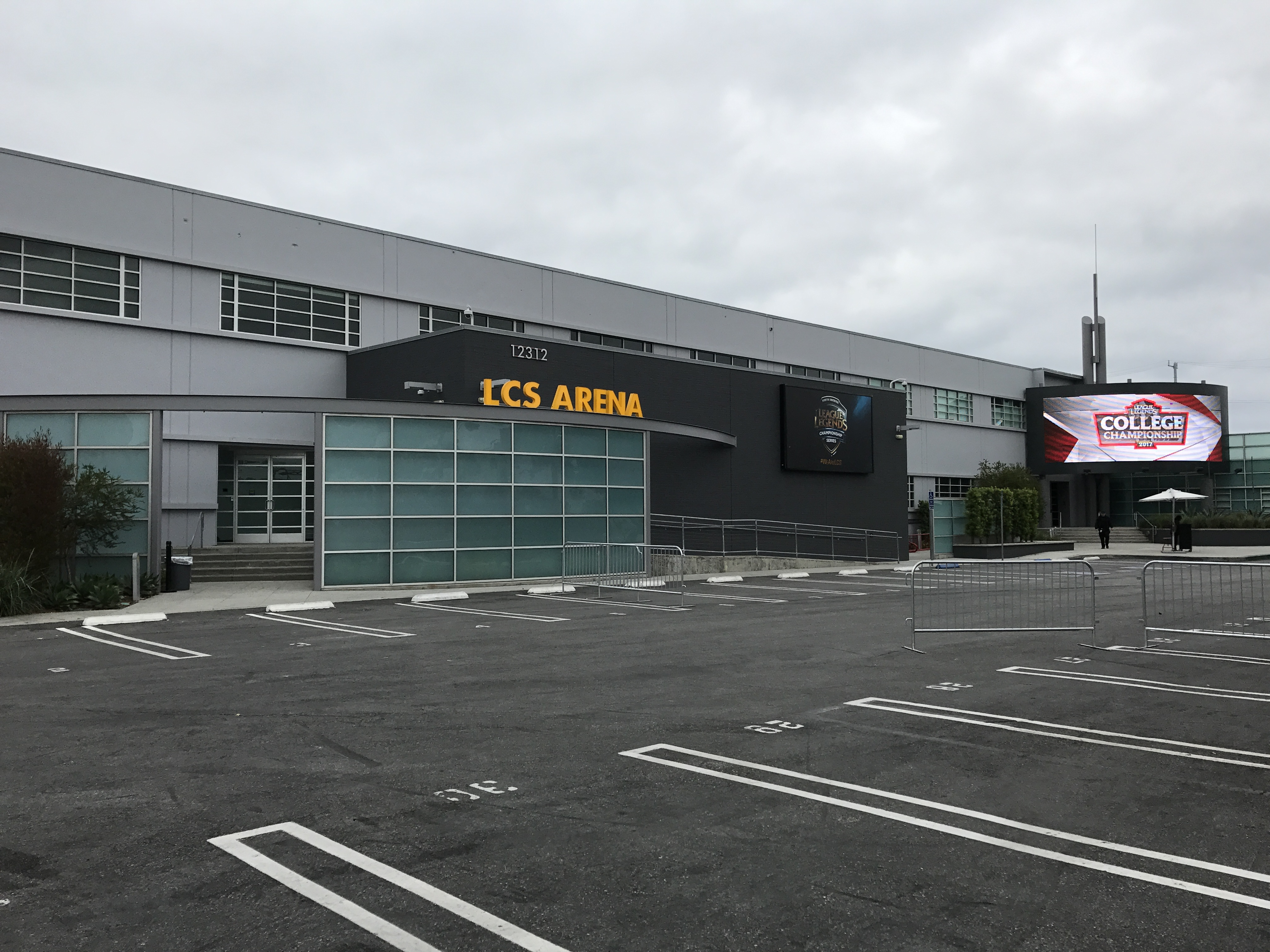
The Riot Games Arena in Los Angeles, United States (then known as the LCS Arena)

Riot Games Arena is the name given to three dedicated esports venues operated by video game developer and publisher Riot Games. The three arenas are located in Los Angeles, California, United States; Berlin, Germany; and São Paulo, Brazil.

Each arena hosts one or both of Riot Games' regional leagues in League of Legends and the Valorant Champions Tour (VCT) and acts as the main competition venue and studio for both. In some instances, it serves as one of the venues for international League of Legends and Valorant competitions.

While these facilities are the primary venues for Riot Games' esports leagues in their respective regions, not every game is being played in these arenas due to the scheduling of games as "roadshows" in different areas.

== Los Angeles ==
Riot Games Arena Los Angeles
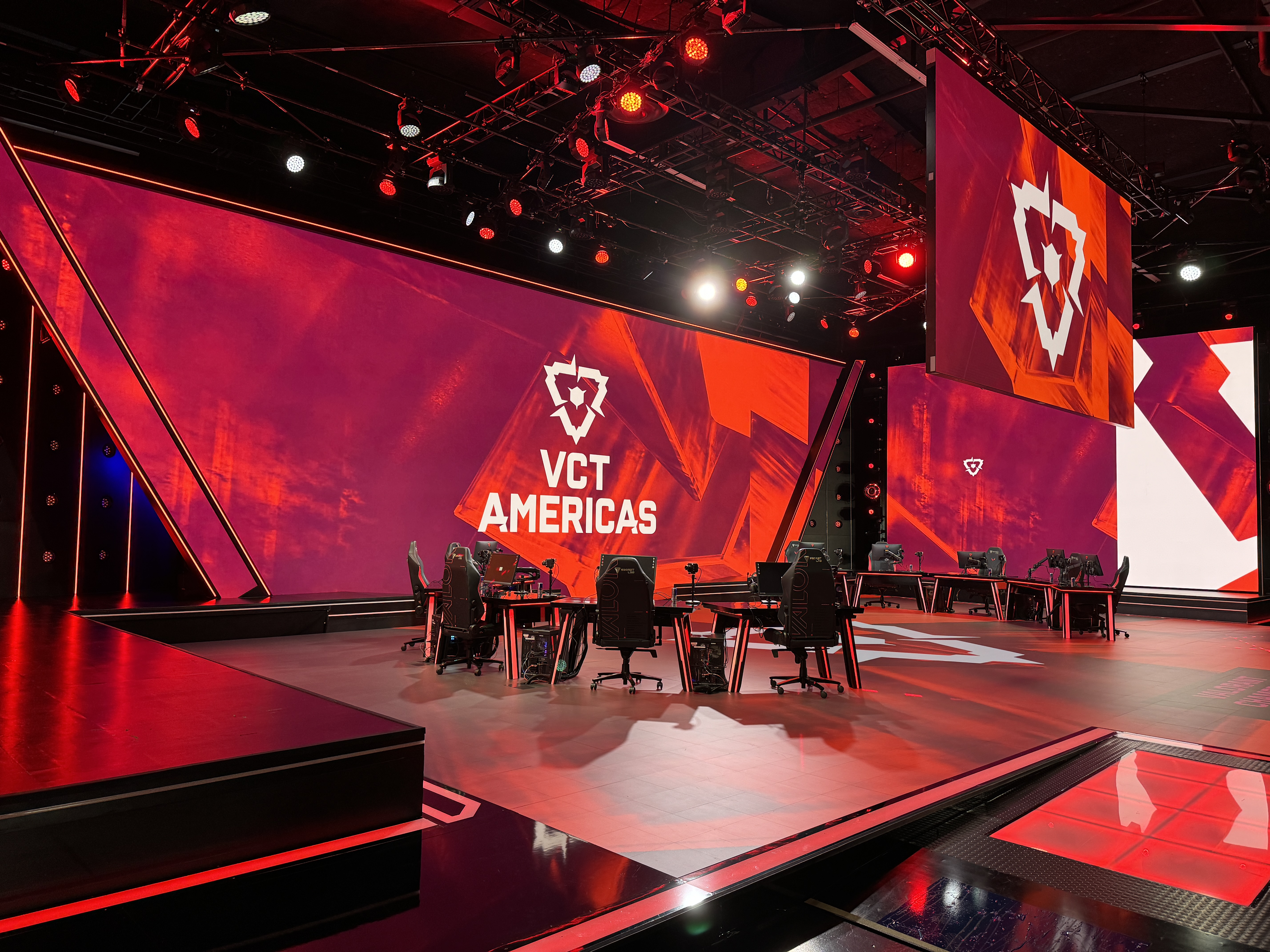
- The arena during the Valorant Champions Tour
- Former names: LCS Arena (2014–2022)
- Location: Los Angeles, California, United States
- Capacity: 300

Construction
- Opened: 2013; 13 years ago

Tenants
- League Championship Series; Valorant Champions Tour Americas; North American Challengers League

The Riot Games Arena in Los Angeles hosts the League Championship Series (LCS) and the Valorant Champions Tour Americas. It is one of the buildings that form part of Riot Games' global headquarters in the western part of the city.

Opened in 2013 as the main studio for League of Legends esports competitions, it was named the LCS Arena from its opening until 2023. Prior to the start of the 2023 season, the facility was renamed to "Riot Games Arena" as the venue also became the main venue for the Valorant Champions Tour Americas league.

Major renovations to the arena were completed in early 2023 to coincide with the name change and the inclusion of VCT Americas, featuring an 18-inch high stage with over 1,000 LED screens, and a modular stage set-up, allowing the LCS and VCT operate with different set-ups.

=== Events ===
Aside from the LCS and the VCT Americas, the arena also hosts select games of the North American Challengers League (NACL) for League of Legends and has held several esports events and online specials:

- 2015 and 2017 League of Legends All-Star
- League of Legends - WWE vs. NXT (online special aired on the WWE Network)
- 2018 and 2019 Rift Rivals: Blue Rift (Europe vs. North America)
- 2026 League of Legends World Championship (play-in stage).

=== Other facilities ===
Aside from the main arena, other areas include a studio for pre and post-game coverages, a PC café, a cafeteria which includes arcade games, and a merchandise store.

== Berlin ==
Riot Games Arena Berlin
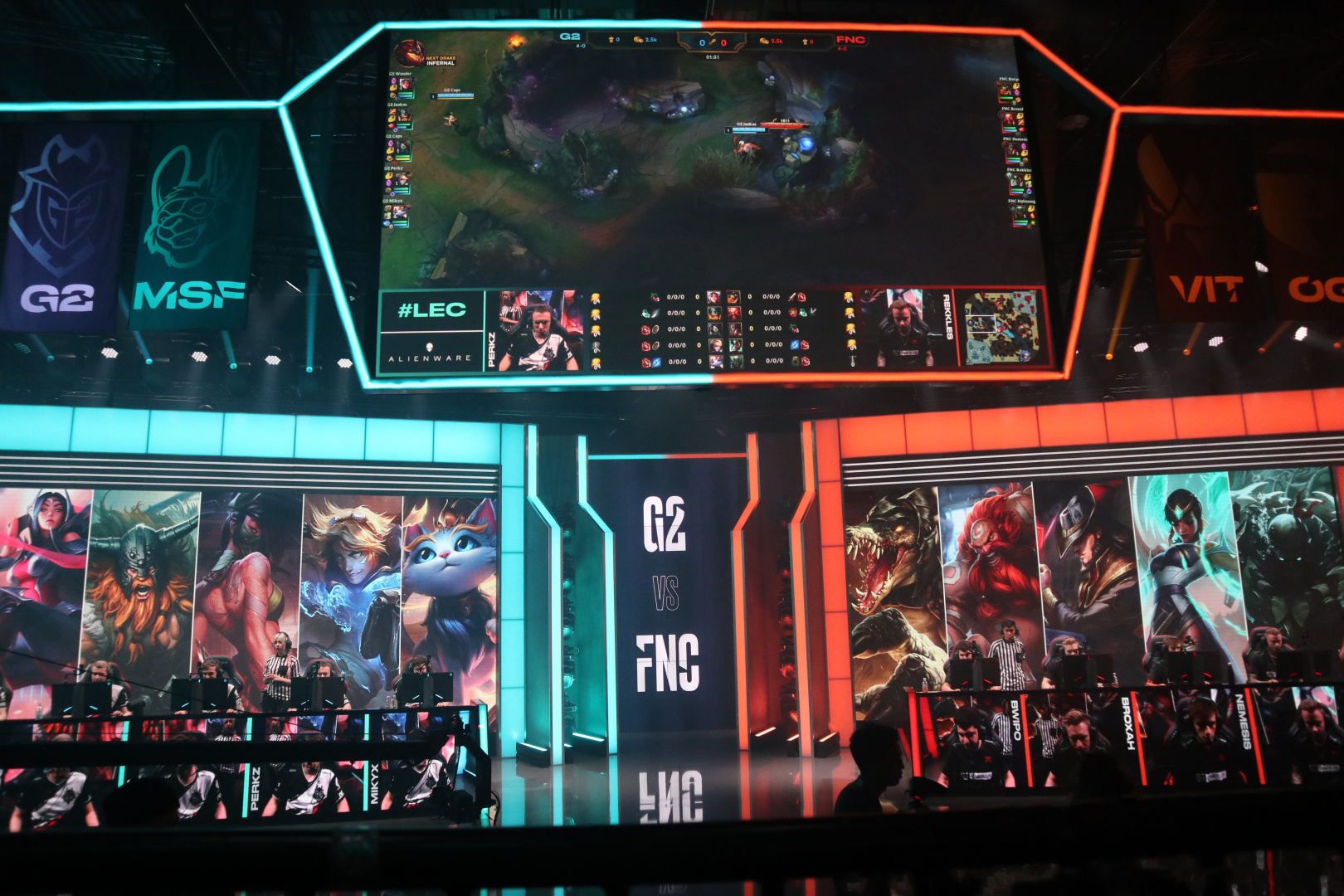
- The arena during the 2019 LEC Summer Split before major renovation works in 2023
- Former names: LEC Studio (2015–2023)
- Location: Adlershof, Berlin, Germany
- Capacity: 210

Construction
- Opened: 2015; 11 years ago

Tenants
- League of Legends EMEA Championship; Valorant Champions Tour EMEA

The Riot Games Arena in Berlin hosts the League of Legends EMEA Championship (LEC) and the Valorant Champions Tour EMEA. It is situated in the Adlershof quarter within the Treptow-Köpenick borough of the city.

In 2014, Riot Games announced that it was moving its Germany office and its league studio to Berlin from Cologne, where the LEC (then known as the European League Championship Series or EU LCS) held games during its first two years from 2013 to 2014. In November 2023, plans for a major renovation of the arena were announced and the facility was subsequently renamed as the "Riot Games Arena".

Renovation works were completed in January 2024 in time for the 2024 LEC and VCT EMEA seasons. The venue has an amphitheater-style setup with six warm-up rooms and huddle areas for teams and players, as well as dedicated areas for casters and co-streamers.

=== Events ===
Aside from the LEC and the VCT EMEA, the arena has held several esports events, including two editions of the League of Legends World Championship

- 2019 League of Legends World Championship (play-in stage)
- 2024 League of Legends World Championship (play-in and swiss stages)
- 2024 Valorant Game Changers Championship

=== Other facilities ===
Aside from the main arena, other areas include a food bar connected to a lounge, a merchandise shop, and a studio for pre and post-game coverages.

== São Paulo ==
Riot Games Arena São Paulo
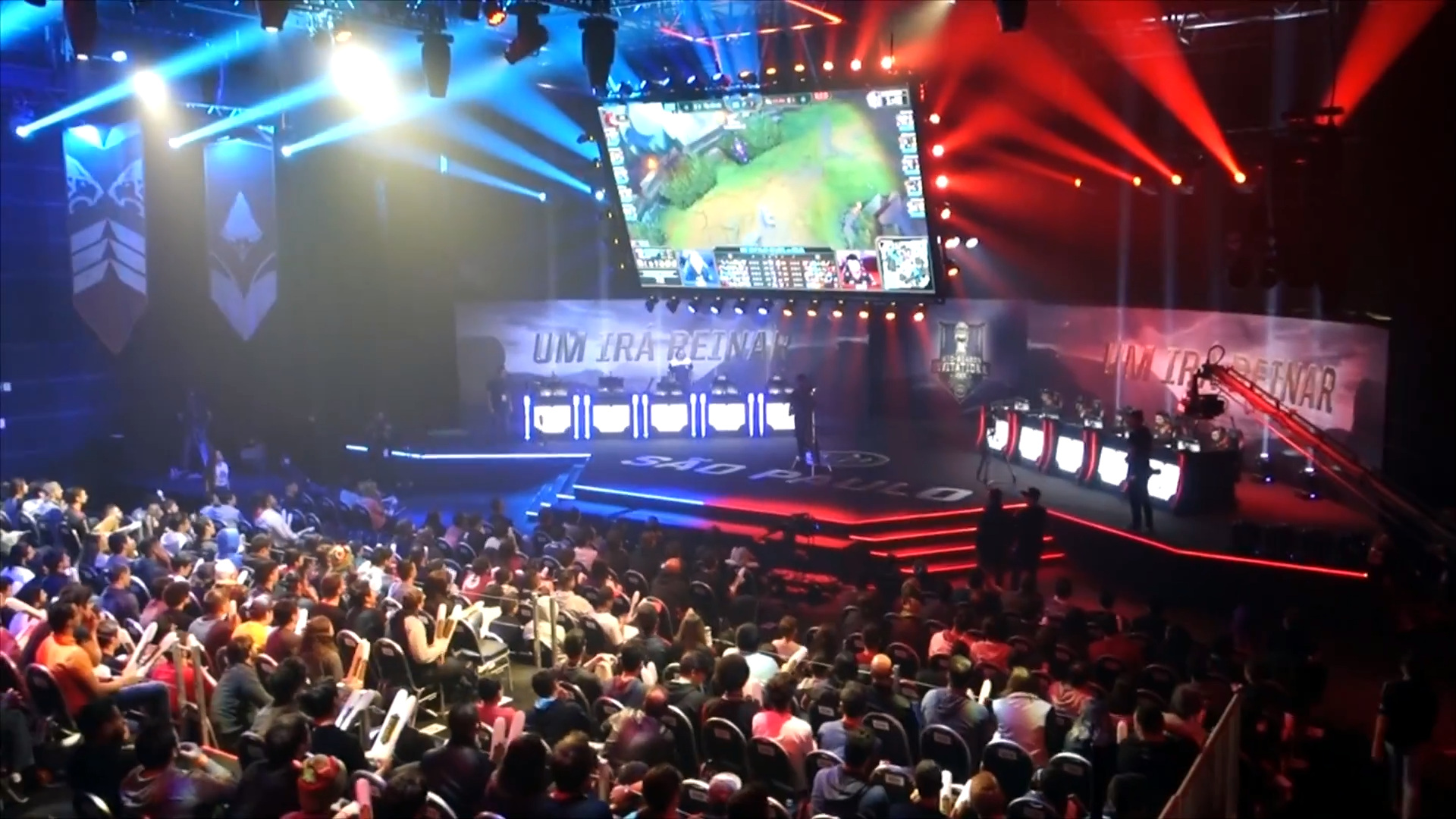
- The arena during the 2017 Mid-Season Invitational
- Former names: Arena CBLOL (until 2024)
- Location: Barra Funda, São Paulo, Brazil
- Capacity: 140

Tenants
- Campeonato Brasileiro de League of Legends; Circuito Desafiante

The Riot Games Arena in São Paulo hosts the Campeonato Brasileiro de League of Legends (CBLOL). It is located in the city's Barra Funda district and is part of Riot Games' headquarters in Brazil.

Matches for the league began as early as 2015, when the CBLOL was only two years from its inception. In 2017, it hosted the 2017 Mid-Season Invitational - the facility's first international League of Legends competition. During the 2020 CBLOL season's first split, the arena suffered damages due to flooding brought about by heavy rainfall in the city and surrounding areas, resulting in the league's postponement.

In March 2022, the arena, which underwent major renovations, re-opened to fans after a hiatus due to the COVID-19 pandemic. The facility's second major renovation occurred prior to the start of the first and only League of Legends Championship of The Americas (LTA) season in 2025, and was subsequently renamed to "Riot Games Arena".

=== Events ===
Aside from the CBLOL, the arena also hosts select games of the Circuito Desafiante (Brazilian Challenger Circuit) and has held several esports tournaments for both League of Legends and Valorant:

- 2017 Mid-Season Invitational (play-in stage)
- VCT Ascension Americas 2023 & 2025
- 2026 Americas Cup (League of Legends)
- 2026 First Stand Tournament
- 2026 Valorant Game Changers Championship

=== Other facilities ===
Aside from the main arena, the venue has a dedicated space for casters and co-streamers, a studio for pre and post-game coverages, and a merchandise shop.

== Related arenas ==
=== LoL Park ===
LoL Park is an esports and recreational facility in Seoul, South Korea. The facility opened in 2018 and includes an esports arena which mostly hosts League of Legends Champions Korea (LCK) matches. On 16 December 2025, as part of Naver's acquisition of the broadcast rights to the LCK, the venue was rebranded to CHZZK LoL Park, named after the company's streaming platform, CHZZK.

The arena has held two editions of the League of Legends World Championship in 2018 and 2023, hosting the play-in stage in both editions. It also held the inaugural First Stand Tournament in 2025, as well as the 2025 Valorant Game Changers Championship.

=== VCT CN Arena ===
VCT CN Arena is the main venue for Valorant Champions Tour China (VCT CN). Located in Shanghai, China, the arena opened in 2024 with a construction time of 50 working days. The facility hosted the group stage and the first few playoff stages of Valorant Masters Shanghai 2024.

=== LCP Arena ===
LCP Arena is the main venue for the League of Legends Championship Pacific (LCP). Located in the Datong District of Taipei, Taiwan, the 136-seater arena was opened to the public in 2025 ahead of the Mid Season split of the 2025 LCP season. Aside from the main arena, other areas of the facility include a merchandise store, food bar, and huddle rooms for teams.
