= Bisu (gamer) =

South Korean Starcraft player

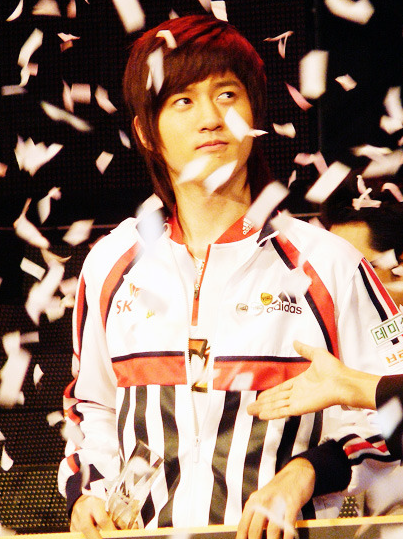
- Bisu in 2008

Personal information
- Name: 김택용 (Kim Taek-yong)
- Nationality: Republic of Korea

Career information
- Games: StarCraft; StarCraft II
- Playing career: 2005–present
- Role: Protoss

Team history
- 2005–2006: Pirates of Space
- 2006–2008: MBCGame HERO
- 2008–2013: SK Telecom T1

Korean name
- Hangul: 김택용
- Hanja: 金澤容
- RR: Gim Taekyong
- MR: Kim T'aegyong

Kim Taek-yong, known by his screen name Bisu[Shield] or simply Bisu, is a South Korean professional StarCraft player, playing the Protoss race. Famed primarily for sublime performance in the StarCraft: Brood War professional competitions against Protoss and, especially, Zerg, Bisu scored three successful Starleague performances, the most of any Protoss player. Bisu was nicknamed the Revolutionist for innovating the metagame of Protoss versus Zerg matchup.

Since his transfer from MBCGame HERO to SK Telecom T1 team in 2008 Bisu, along with Stork, has been leading the Protoss players and both were called "Twin Carriages". Bisu is ranked 2nd in the Elo rating system. In the 2010 Team Liquid forum poll Bisu was voted "the greatest Protoss player of all time". He retired from Starcraft II in 2013. After retirement, he started his personal broadcast by Afreeca TV. Bisu also participates in AfreecaTV StarCraft League.

== Early life ==
Kim was born in the South Korean county of Yesan. In his early years, before moving to Seoul, he lived in the city of Cheonan with his home being next to his school. Since childhood, however, Kim did not favour studying and became gradually addicted to computers in grade school. He also used to play soccer "until the sun went down" and has been always picked first during team arrangements; he wished to become a soccer player, but following his growing interest in video games, Kim quit playing soccer and his soccer experience slowly faded away. Kim started playing StarCraft while in the fourth school grade and up to high school has been the most experienced player in his class. Before choosing StarCraft Kim tried Lineage and Fortress, gaining some experience in the latter. Because he became a professional gamer at age 17, Kim was unable to attend an institute of higher education. He lately entered Sejong University.

== Gaming career ==
Kim considered becoming a professional gamer as a freshman in high school. He began playing StarCraft: Brood War when one of his relatives took him to an internet café. As a newcomer Bisu used to watch others' games and particularly liked those of NaDa, as well as Nal rA's strategic gameplay. Nonetheless, Bisu did not have any particular role model and wanted to emulate all great players. During Bisu's MBCGame HERO (Pirates of Space at the time) years his gameplay was largely influenced by Protoss player Pusan, whose games Bisu frequently watched. Bisu's coach and player Best in turn taught him everything related to Protoss builds.

Having participated in high-level competitive matchups since 2006, Bisu made his breakthrough at the 2007 MBCgame Starleague (MSL) final, defeating experienced players Nal_rA and sAviOr, both 3:0. At that time Bisu was one of the few Starleague Protoss players. He qualified for the 2007 MSL automatically for having received a KeSPA distinction as the best Protoss player. Prior to the breakthrough match with sAviOr, which is sometimes referred to as "March 3rd revolution", Protoss players generally underperformed against Zerg. However, this was soon to change. During Bisu's preparations for the match with sAviOr, the MBCGame HERO coaching staff, as well as Protoss and Zerg players gave Bisu some ideas. The general advice was to use Corsair units to eliminate Zerg Overlords, narrowing Zerg's observation. Bisu's effective execution of this strategy found great success. Following Bisu's victory, several players started to emulate his winning Corsair–Dark Templar combination to fight Zerg opponents.

In the first half of February, 2008 Bisu (who was already atop of the KeSPA ranking, the first protoss to achieve that) was transferred from the MBCGame HERO team to SK Telecom T1. The latter team failed to score good results in leagues and confront the new generation of professional gamers, and the entire coaching staff was dismissed. Players iloveoov and Kingdom were promoted to coaches instead. To fill the gaps and to improve the performance results, SK Telecom T1 acquired Bisu. Bisu later called his transfer "definitely a turning point" for him as a gamer. In 2009, to fill up the schedule, OnGameNet arranged an All-Star Race Battle, where four players of each race (Protoss, Terran and Zerg) would compete in a knockout series. Bisu defeated the Terran lineup of players Flash, Hwasin, Leta and NaDa, but failed to score a win against sAviOr.

In the fall of 2008 Zerg players adopted a three-base five-Hatchery strategy against Protoss and nearly all attempts to counter it failed. Protoss players had particular difficulty using Zealots against Hydralisks in a choke battle as the Zealots could not spread out effectively, while Hydralisks could clump easily, not allowing Zealots to take advantage of their speed upgrade. Bisu managed to successfully use speed-upgraded Zealots to obtain map control and engage the Hydralisks before they reach mass numbers. While other professional Protoss players have around a 60% win ratio against Zerg, Bisu's ratio against that race reached over 90% in the 2010–2011 competition season. During the 2010–2011 Shinhan Bank Proleague Bisu also achieved the largest number of wins. In the past, however, Bisu was not particularly favored against any good Zerg player. On April 2, 2011, Bisu, having defeated Jaedong in the Shinhan Winners League playoff, broke what he called "a vicious cycle" of his Protoss versus Zerg gameplay. He once revealed, that only after learning the skill of combining different units (i.e. ground, air, high templars, reavers) he began to enjoy playing against Zerg.

Bisu's matchup against Protoss players is statistically in the middle between Zerg and Terran and could be traced back to 2005. From then and until February 2006 he had been in a 3-loss streak against Protoss players and played with intermittent success until the matchup with Nal rA. In February 2007 Bisu achieved a 3-win streak against him, which contributed to Bisu's uninterrupted 6-win streak against Protoss in the same year.

Bisu's win rate against Terran players has been the lowest when compared to Protoss or Zerg, although he managed to defeat veteran Terran players SlayerS `BoxeR` and NaDa already in his early career. Bisu acknowledged his poor performance particularly against Terran Siege Tanks, as well as his relatively subpar control of Carriers. On November 17, 2007, Bisu lost to then little known Terran player, Mind, during the GOMTV MSL final despite being an absolute tournament favorite; Mind instead became the youngest MSL champion at 16 years old. Bisu then went on a slump, making a comeback in the next year by winning the ClubDay MSL final against another Protoss player, JangBi. From July to August, 2010 Bisu had been in one of his worst streaks, with 5 losses against Terran players. On March 5 of that year he was eliminated from the Korean Air OSL by losing to Terran player go.go in the 36th round. Following Bisu's elimination he was given a break, explained by exhaustion from a hectic schedule and poor physical form. Bisu picked Stork's play pattern against Terran as the one he wants to learn.

Together with Stork, Flash, and Jaedong, Bisu made up a high-tier quartet called "Taek–Bang–Lee–Ssang", after the players' given names and Stork's nickname "Bang". Showing a relatively low win rate against Stork and Flash (41.67% and 38.46%, respectively, as of June 2011), Bisu achieved a 60% rate against Jaedong. Bisu and Jaedong had a period of tight rivalry against each other, competing for the top place of the KeSPA rankings: during the 2008-2009 Shinhan Proleague season both players finished the 4th round with a total tally of 44 wins, while their individual league wins equaled to three at certain point. On par with Stork, Bisu established what is occasionally called the "Taek–Bang era" of professional StarCraft. However, as opposed to Stork, Bisu's OSL title has been elusive. After competing in three OSL qualifiers in 2006–2007 Bisu unsuccessfully pursued the OSL titles of 2008, 2009 and 2010. Nonetheless, as of June, 2011, Bisu collected five Monthly MVP titles, equaling that achievement with Flash, Jaedong and SlayerS_`BoxeR`. On June 7, 2011, having defeated Protoss player Flying, Bisu equaled Flash's record of 57 victories in a StarCraft Proleague season. In addition Bisu managed to advance to the main group stage of the MSL tournament 11 times in a row, approaching sAviOr's record of 13. He also scored the unprecedented result of four all-kills (a form of StarCraft competitions, where one team is eliminated by a single player of the other team). In 2010 Bisu was nominated by Fomos for the title of Player of the Year and Protoss of the Year.

After the transition to StarCraft II, Bisu rarely played for his team SK Telecom T1, accumulating a 12–16 record and eventually announced his retirement on September 9, 2013

Bisu's game performance, as well as that of Protoss in general, has been influenced by maps on which the StarCraft matches are played. Although StarCraft is considered a balanced game in that all three races have successful professional players, the maps differ from each other in properties such as the terrain openness. One thing Bisu did during practice was to take notes, so he wouldn't forget what he practiced and learned.

=== Playing style ===
Like other Protoss players, Bisu generally starts the games with commencing a second base, Corsair harass when confronting Zerg and subsequent attack of mixed units, including High Templars. Conducting a relentless harassment, often using Probe scouts and known for superlative multitasking, Bisu widely used Corsairs to gain air superiority and Dark Templar assaults against Zerg. Bisu's harassment style and the use of Shuttles were praised particularly by Stork. Bisu popularized the associated opening against Zerg, which has been called the "Bisu build": a Protoss player in such opening would warp in a Forge, skipping weapon upgrades, and having warped in a second Assimilator early, would ultimately proceed to Corsairs and Dark Templar harass, followed by extensive Gateway gameplay. Bisu subsequently qualified Corsairs and Dark Templars as his favorite units.

Along with Corsair and Shuttle harass, Bisu's multitasking and Zealot timing rushes are considered standard for his matches against Zerg players. During the 2011 Shinhan Winners League match against Zerg player Peace, in particular, Bisu dispatched Zealots to Peace's two bases at different locations while eliminating Overlords with his Corsairs; after this split Bisu focused his Zealots on eliminating Peace's Drones while micromanaging his Corsairs to evade opponent's Scourges, making it seem as if four different persons were playing for Protoss.

In his gameplay against Protoss Bisu successfully used the so-called Manner Pylons to block direct access to his opponent's mineral fields and disrupt his economy. During the 2007 Shinhan Bank Proleague Bisu secured an early victory over PokJu by placing a Manner Pylon close to PokJu's Probes and warping in two Gateways behind PokJu's mineral line. Unable to respond to the unexpected gameplay, PokJu surrendered the game in a mere three minutes, in what is widely considered the most effective use of Manner Pylons in a professional game. In the 2008 Incruit OSL Bisu applied the Manner Pylon against Much twice in a row, managing to keep the opponent behind by a slight margin. In the following year, at the WCG Grand Final, Bisu put two consecutive Manner Pylons at player PJ's base.

While hotkeying, Bisu usually sets F2 for the main Nexus, F3 for Gateways and F4 for the natural expansion. As described by Bisu in an interview, his hotkey setup against Zerg, for example, could be "1" and "2" for Zealots, "3" for Dragoons, "4" for High Templars, "5" for Observers and "6", "7", "8", "9" for Gateways. Bisu's APM rate may oscillate around 332–391, as in his 3-game matchup against Stork in 2008 in particular.

=== Tournaments ===
Place	Tournament/league (major achievements only)
1st	2009 WCG Korea Finals
2nd	2009 Averatec-Intel Classic Special Match
3rd	2009 WCG
1st	2009 GOMTV Averatec-Intel Classic Season 2
1st	2008 ClubDay MBCgame Starleague
3rd	2007 EVER OnGameNet Starleague
2nd	2007 GOMTV MBCgame StarLeague Season 3
1st	2007 GOMTV MBCgame StarLeague Season 2
1st	2006–2007 GOMTV MBCgame StarLeague Season 1

== Personal life ==
Not having any particular hobbies, Bisu usually stays inside the practice house, spending time by himself. When not practicing, he watches TV or goes on the internet.

Bisu dated several girls, but, according to him, all of them could not understand his tight professional gaming schedules and lifestyle. While acknowledging he always wanted to date a girl, Bisu revealed that he would get anxious as his match records would fall. Bisu once expressed a wish to "meet a girlfriend who is considerate of others".

== Military service ==
Kim joined the military in 2017. He left a notice titled " Join the Army " on the bulletin board of his personal network on July 5. He joined the active service and entered the boot camp of the 32nd Division.
