= July (gamer) =

South Korean electronic sports player

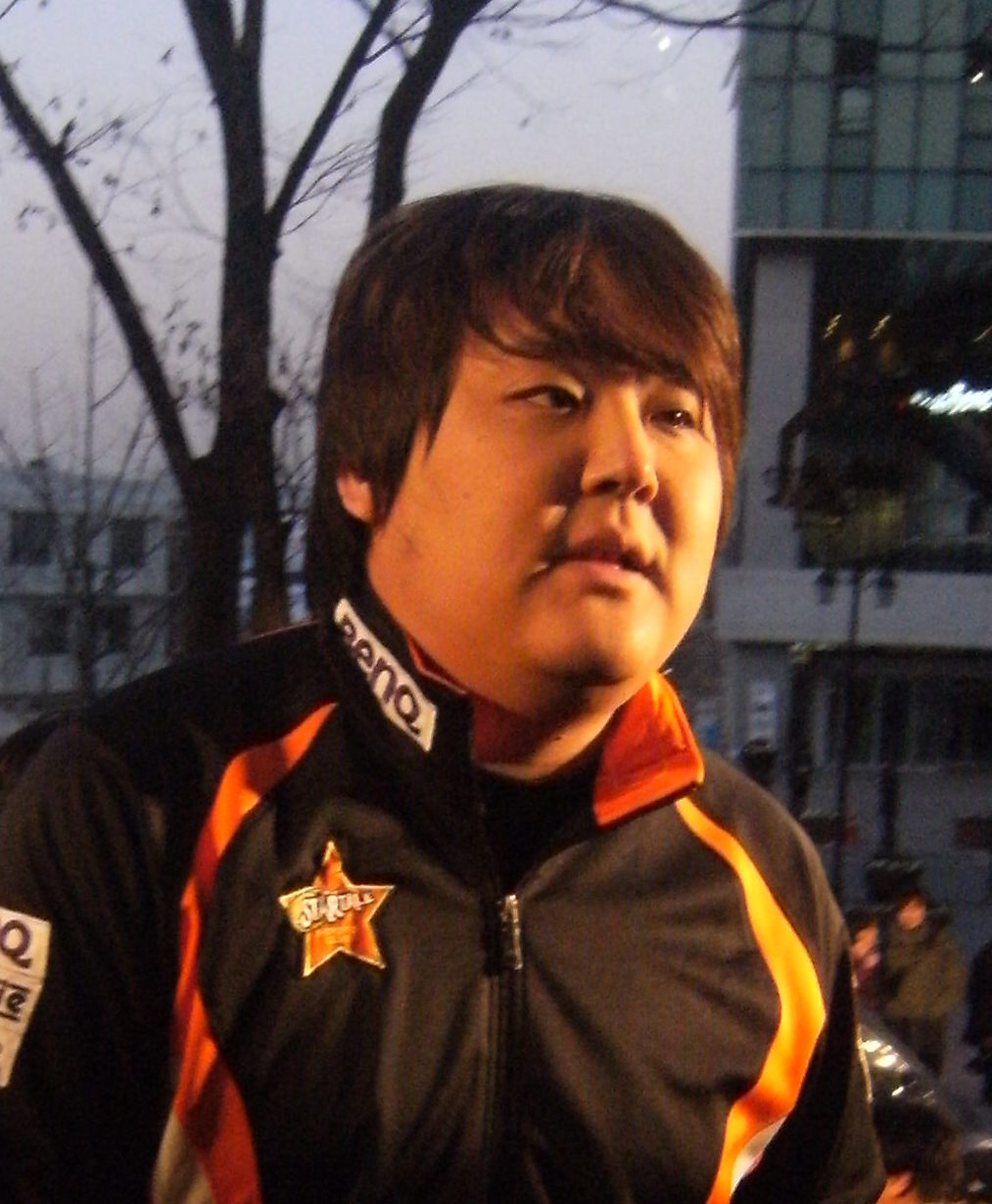

Personal information
- Name: Park Sung-joon
- Nationality: Republic of Korea

Career information
- Games: StarCraft: Brood War; StarCraft II
- Role: Zerg

Team history
- 2007–2008: SK Telecom T1
- 2008–2010: STX SouL
- 2010–2012: StarTale

Korean name
- Hangul: 박성준
- Hanja: 朴聖俊
- RR: Bak Seongjun
- MR: Pak Sŏngjun

Park Sung-joon (Korean: 박성준) is a professional player of the real-time strategy game StarCraft. He is known by his pseudonym July, a shortened version of JulyZerg. Park Sung-joon is also known as the "God of War" or "Tushin. Park used to play for the team STX SouL.

== StarCraft ==
July emerged onto the scene during Gilette OSL (OnGame Net Starleague), where he beat Oov 3–2 in a famous series and went on to win the tournament against Reach, making him a royal roader and the first Zerg to ever win an OSL.

He later won another OSL (Ever 2), a KT-KTF tournament and the ITV league. He also made another OSL final which he lost 3–0 to Nada.

After reaching another OSL final in early 2006 and losing 3–0 to his longtime rival Oov, July experienced a period with fewer major results. He later defeated Xellos and Oov in the Proleague finals and advanced to the final round of the OSL.

On July 12, 2008, July defeated the new Protoss phenom, BeSt, in the 2008 EVER OSL, by a score of 3–0. The victory was July's third OSL title, which won him the Golden Mouse, a prestigious achievement held previously only by Lee Yun-Yeol (NaDa).

As of September 10, 2010, he has not renewed his contract with STX_SouL and has announced that he will be moving to the StarCraft 2 scene in a new team and will continue to play as Zerg. And on November 10, July has qualified for the GSL Pre-Season 3.

== Starcraft II ==
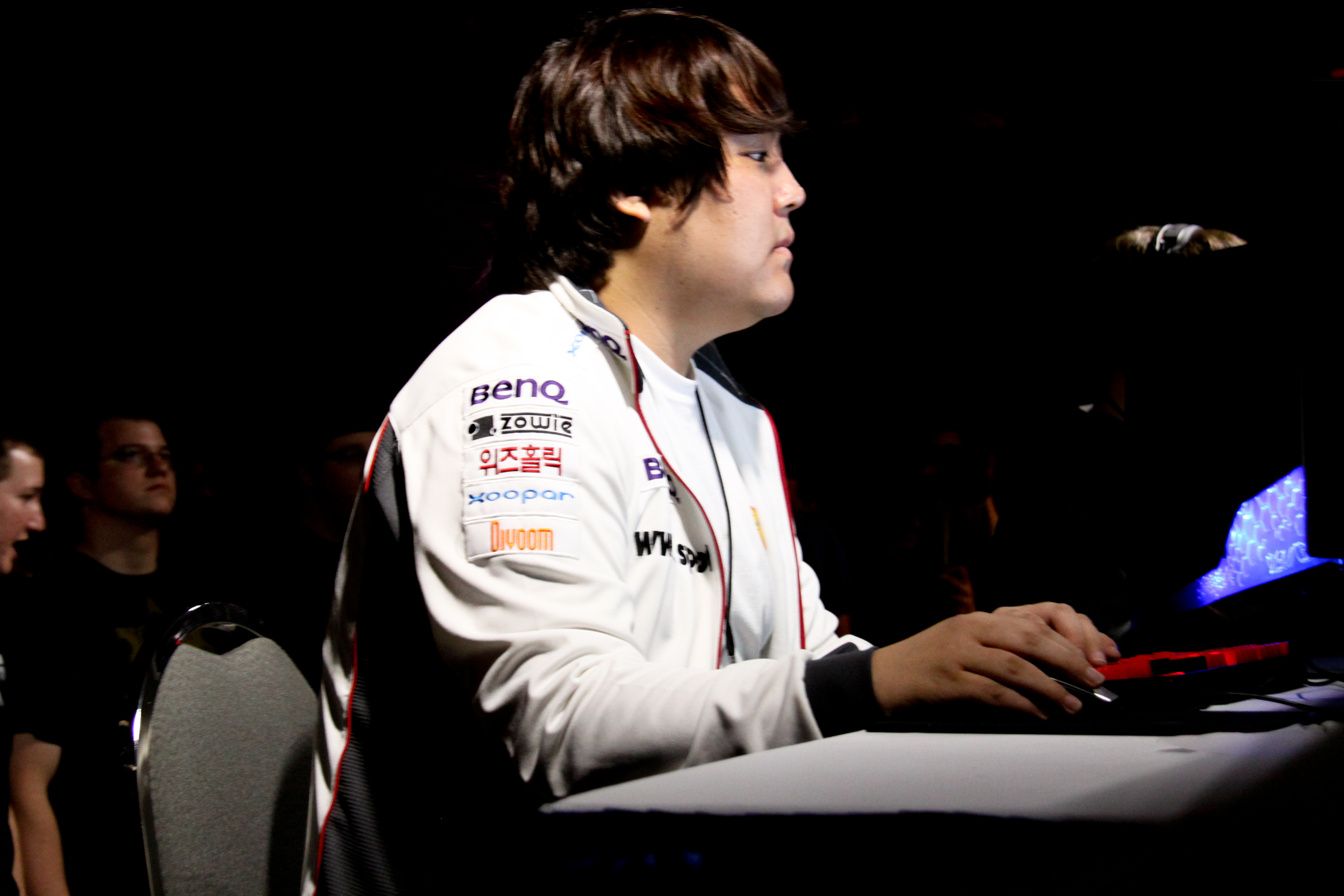
Sung-joon in 2011

On September 15, 2010, the name of this new team has been revealed as STARTALE.

Park Sung-joon qualified for Code A during GSL season 3 after making it to the RO16, but there losing to oGsMC (Jang Min-Chul, that season's GSL winner).

GSL January was a successful season for ST_July, as he was able to make it past OdinMVP as well as `Slayers`Yugioh, only to lose to ZenexByun during the Code A Ro8. As a result of this success, he was a participant in the up and down matches following the end of the tournament. The up and down matches allow deserving Code A players the chance to be promoted to Code S, and allows undeserving Code S players to be demoted back down to Code A.

Park Sung-joon initially faltered in his performance against ZenexKyrix (ZvZ), but rallied back in his second match against TSL_Rain (ZvT), which allowed him entry into Code S. Following the up and down matches, players from Code S were allowed, based on performance, to choose their grouping for GSL March (GSL February was dedicated to the team league). ST_July somewhat controversially chose to be in Group A (the group of death as it was later dubbed), calling out Season 3 winner oGsMC for having been defeated by him in previously mentioned Season 3 Ro8. In the process, he managed to put himself in the same group as two previous GSL winners. oGsHyperDub was also in this group.

On February 22, at 18:45, ST_July faced oGsMC in the Code S round of 32 for Group A. ST_July was defeated, and as per schedule, immediately faced IMMvp, widely accepted as the best Starcraft II player in the world because he has the highest win percentage in every matchup (TvT, TvZ, TvP). IMMvP was also the winner of the most recent GSL season, further solidifying his position as the best in the world. A loss to IMMvP would remove him from the tournament and risk his Code S status.

ST_July defeated IMMvP, improving his record to 1-1 for the series and guaranteeing that, although he might not advance, he would not be subject to the up and down matches (which would jeopardize his position in Code S). The next match between oGsMC (the winner of match 2) and oGsHyperDub (the loser of match 1) would determine whether or ST_July would rematch IMMvP to determine who advances, or whether everyone would be tied 1-1 and July would be playing oGsHyperDub. oGsMC went on to defeat HyperDub to knock him into up and down/matches, and himself advance, thus setting up a rematch with IMMvP and ST_July.

ST_July defeated IMMvP a second time, improving his record to 2-1 for the series, advancing to the Ro16, and putting IMMvP's status as the best current Starcraft 2 player in jeopardy.

He went on to face Lee Yun-Yeol (aka oGsNada), in the Round of 8, defeating him 3-2 and advancing to the semi-finals. ST_July took the first two games, lost the next two due to oGsNada's defense, to finally win the fifth one thanks to mutalisk micro and constant aggression.

ST_July reached the Code S finals of the GSL season March. He was defeated by former Code S champion oGsMC in a best of seven format, losing 4–1.

Before his retirement (which was due to military obligations), July clocked in at an eye-popping average of 818APM during the televised Korean StarCraft II League 2012 Season 1 tournament. Since his retirement, no one had ever beaten this legendary score, as of 2023.

== Tournament results ==
- 1st — OnGameNet StarLeague 2008 EVER OSL
- 2nd — World Cyber Games 2006 World Cyber Games
- 2nd — OnGameNet StarLeague 2005 ShinHan OSL
- 1st — OnGameNet StarLeague 2005 EVER OSL
- 2nd — OnGameNet StarLeague 2004-2005 IOPS OSL
- 1st — OnGameNet StarLeague 2004 Gillette OSL

== Honors ==
- i-TV amateur strongest two week championship(2003)
- MBC GAME TEAM LEAGUE KOREAN CHAMPION 4(2003)
- 3rd in i-TV Rookie(2003)
- Gillette Ongamenet Star League Championship(2004)
- iTV Ranking 7th Ranking Championship win(2004)
- KT-KTF Premier League winner(2005)
- EVER Star League Championship(2005)
- Ipsos Ongamenet Star League second place(2005)
- Shinhan Bank Ongamenet Star League second place(2005)
- 1st Korea e-Sports Grand Prize Best Zug Player(2006)
- SKY PRO LEAGUE LEAGUE FINAL Final MVP(2007)
- EVER Star League Championship(2008)
- 2nd Generation Intel Core GSL Mar. Code S, second place(2011)
