= Starleague =

Starleague may refer to:

- StarCraft II StarLeague a South Korean StarCraft II tournament
- Ongamenet Starleague, a South Korean StarCraft individual league

== See also ==
- MBCGame StarCraft League
- Qatar Stars League, a football league
