= MBCGame StarCraft League =

South Korean e-sports competition

- Formerly: KPGA Tour
- Sport: StarCraft: Brood War
- Founded: 2002
- Folded: 2012
- Country: South Korea
- Venues: HERO Center at the COEX Convention & Exhibition Center (2006–2008); HERO Center at the Mullae-dong LOOX (2008–2012)
- Last champion: Lee "Flash" Young-ho
- Most titles: Three times: Flash iloveoov NaDa sAviOr; Bisu
- Broadcaster: MBCGame

The MBCGame StarCraft League, also known as MSL, was a StarCraft tournament hosted by Korean television network MBCGame. The tournament started out in 2002 under the name of KPGA Tour, and in 2003 it was renamed the MSL. On February 1, 2012, MBCGame ceased operations and the MSL was discontinued. Throughout its lifetime, the MSL gave away the equivalent of over US$1.6 million in prize money.

== League Championships ==
Year	Tournament	Winner	Runner-up
2002	KPGA 1st Tour	BoxeR	YellOw
2002	Reebok KPGA 2nd Tour	NaDa	YellOw
2002	Pepsi Twist KPGA 3rd Tour	NaDa	Reach
2002	Baskin Robbins KPGA 4th Tour	NaDa	ChoJJa
2003	Stout MSL	Nal_rA	NaDa
2003	TriGem MSL	iloveoov	YellOw
2004	HanaFOS CENGAME MSL	iloveoov	NaDa
2004	SPRIS MSL	iloveoov	Kingdom
2004	You Are The Golf King MSL	GoRush	NaDa
2005	UZOO MSL	sAviOr	Reach
2005	LG CYON MSL	ChoJJa	sAviOr
2006	Pringles MSL	sAviOr	Nal_rA
2006	Pringles MSL Season 2	sAviOr	Silver
2006	GomTV MSL	Bisu	sAviOr
2007	GomTV MSL Season 2	Bisu	Stork
2007	GomTV MSL Season 3	Mind	Bisu
2008	GomTV MSL Season 4	Jaedong	Kal
2008	Arena MSL	fOrGG	Jaedong
2008	ClubDay Online MSL	Bisu	JangBi
2009	Lost Saga MSL	Luxury	JangBi
2009	Avalon MSL	Calm	Kwanro
2009	Nate MSL	Jaedong	FlaSh
2010	Hana Daetoo Securities MSL	FlaSh	Jaedong
2010	BigFile MSL	FlaSh	Jaedong
2010	PDPop MSL	Hydra	Great
2011	ABC-Mart MSL	FlaSh	Zero

== Brackets ==
Note: Brackets are re-seeded according to KeSPA ranking in the quarterfinals.

=== 2009 Avalon MSL ===
Round of 16
Calm	2
fOrGG	0
UpMaGiC	0
EffOrt	2
Jaedong	2
Kal	0
Canata	2
PianO	0
Flash	1
Kwanro	2
Pure	0
ZerO	2
Hwasin	0
Iris	2
fantasy	0
Bisu	2

Quarterfinals
Calm	3
EffOrt	0
Jaedong	3
Canata	2
Kwanro	3
ZerO	0
Iris	3
Bisu	2

Semifinals
Calm	3
Jaedong	1
Kwanro	3
Iris	2

Finals
Calm	3
Kwanro	1

=== 2009 Nate MSL ===
Round of 16
Jaedong (Z)	2
FireFist (Z)	0
Stats (P)	2
JangBi (P)	1
Hwasin (T)	2
Guemchi (P)	0
Kal (P)	2
Saint (Z)	0
Light (T)	2
Hero (Z)	0
Kwanro (Z)	2
Bogus (T)	1
Best (P)	2
Canata (T)	0
Flash (T)	2
ZerO (Z)	1

Quarterfinals
Jaedong (Z)	3
Stats (P)	0
Hwasin (T)	1
Kal (P)	3
Light (T)	0
Kwanro (Z)	3
Flash (T)	3
Best (P)	0

Semifinals
Jaedong (Z)	3
Kal (P)	0
Kwanro (Z)	1
Flash (T)	3

Finals
Jaedong (Z)	3
Flash (T)	1

=== 2010 Hana Daetoo Securities MSL ===
Round of 16
BaBy (T)	0
MVP (T)	2
Hydra (Z)	1
Jaedong (Z)	2
Midas (T)	2
JangBi (P)	1
Hwasin (T)	0
FlaSh (T)	2
Sea (T)	1
Free (P)	2
Calm (Z)	2
FanTaSy (T)	1
great (Z)	2
Movie (P)	1
Shuttle (P)	0
HiyA (T)	2

Quarterfinals
FlaSh (T)	3
MVP (T)	1
Free (P)	3
HiyA (T)	2
Jaedong (Z)	3
Midas (T)	0
Calm (Z)	3
great (Z)	2

Semifinals
FlaSh (T)	3
Free (P)	0
Jaedong (Z)	3
Calm (Z)	1

Finals
By.Flash (T)	3
n.Die_Jaedong (Z)	0

=== 2010 Bigfile MSL ===
Round of 16
EffOrt (Z)	2
Midas (T)	0
FlaSh (T)	2
Violet (P)	0
Jaedong (Z)	2
Kal (P)	1
Light (T)	2
RorO (Z)	1
Bisu (P)	0
Sea (T)	2
Stats (P)	1
Calm (Z)	2
FanTaSy (T)	2
Hyuk (Z)	0
Hero (Z)	1
fOrGG (T)	2

Quarterfinals
FlaSh (T)	3
fOrGG (T)	0
Calm (Z)	0
FanTaSy (T)	3
Light (T)	3
EffOrt (Z)	1
Sea (T)	1
Jaedong (Z)	3

Semifinals
FlaSh (T)	3
FanTaSy (T)	2
Light (T)	2
Jaedong (Z)	3

Finals
FlaSh (T)	3
Jaedong (Z)	2

=== 2010 PDPop MSL ===
Round of 16
Calm	2
Ssak	1
Hydra	2
Classic	0
Jaedong	2
Midas	0
Snow	2
HoGiL	0
Action	0
great	2
Soulkey	1
ZerO	2
RorO	0
Kal	2
Bisu	0
Stork	2

Quarterfinals
Jaedong	3
Snow	2
Hydra	3
Calm	0
ZerO	3
Stork	0
great	3
Kal	2

Semifinals
Hydra	3
Jaedong	2
great	3
ZerO	1

Finals
Hydra	3
great	1

=== 2011 ABC Mart MSL ===
Round of 16
Hydra	2
Stork	1
Light	1
Mind	2
Leta	2
Soulkey	1
Calm	2
Hyuk	1
hero	0
ZerO	2
Horang2	1
Grape	2
Reality	1
Jaedong	2
Really	1
Flash	2

Quarterfinals
Jaedong	3
Grape	1
ZerO	3
Calm	2
Hydra	3
Mind	1
Flash	3
Leta	1

Semifinals
Jaedong	1
ZerO	3
Hydra	0
Flash	3

Finals
ZerO	0
Flash	3

== See also ==
- StarCraft professional competition
- Starleague (Ongamenet)
