= Jaedong =

South Korean professional StarCraft player

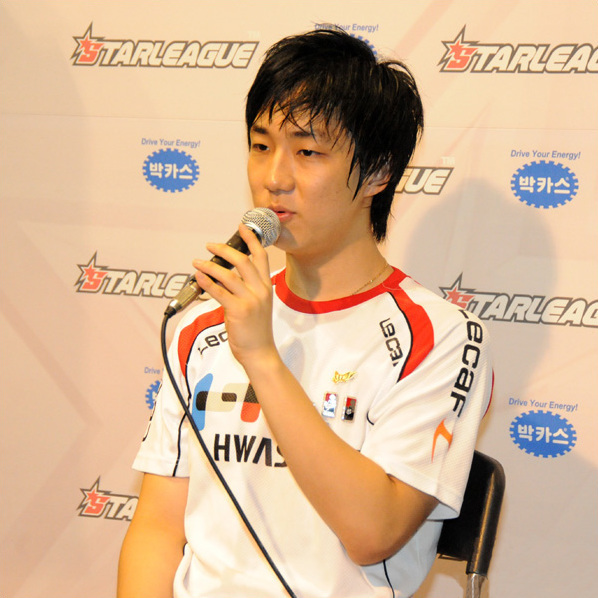
- Jaedong after his victory in the 2009 Bacchus Starleague

Personal information
- Name: Lee Jae-dong
- Nickname(s): The Tyrant; The Legend Killer
- Born: 1989 or 1990 (age 36–37)
- Nationality: South Korean

Career information
- Games: Starcraft: Brood War; Starcraft II
- Playing career: 2006–2016
- Role: Zerg

Team history
- 2006–2011: Hwaseung OZ
- 2011–2012: Team 8/Jin Air Green Wings
- 2012–2016: Evil Geniuses

Career highlights and awards
- 3× OSL champion (2007 EVER, 2008–2009 Batoo, 2009 Bacchus); 2× MSL champion (2008 GOMTV, 2009–2010 NATE); GOMTV TG Classic champion (Season 1); WCG champion (2009); ASUS ROG champion (NorthCon 2013); WEC champion (2014)

Korean name
- Hangul: 이제동
- RR: I Jedong
- MR: I Chedong

Lee Jae-dong (born 9 January 1990), who plays simply under the name Jaedong, is a South Korean professional StarCraft: Brood War player and former StarCraft II player, playing most recently for team Evil Geniuses prior to his StarCraft II retirement. After retiring from StarCraft II, Jaedong returned to playing SC:BW. Announced as a full-time streamer on 12 November 2016, he made his return to the tournament scene a week later during the 2016 KT GiGA Legends Match lll. Using the Zerg race in both games, Lee is considered one of the most successful StarCraft players of all time, having won five OnGameNet Starleague (OSL) and MBCGame StarCraft League (MSL) tournaments, and earning over $600,000 in tournament prize money. His other nicknames include The Tyrant and The Legend Killer.

== Career ==
=== Brood War ===
Jaedong made his debut in 2006 as a member of the Korean team Hwaseung OZ and quickly proved himself to be a talented player. In less than two years he won his first premier tournament, the Seoul International eSports Festival, followed shortly after by both the OSL and the MSL tournaments. Since then he dominated the StarCraft competitive scene, revolutionizing Zerg strategy and establishing a famous rivalry with the Terran player Lee Young-Ho.

Over his six-year career as a StarCraft: Brood War player, Lee set several records. He has the second-highest ELO peak of any player at 2378, and the second highest career win rate at 67.45%. He is one of four players to win the Golden Mouse, which is awarded to players for winning 3 OSL tournaments.. He was named the 2007 and 2009 Player of The Year by KeSPA.

==== Free Agency in 2009 ====
After KESPA revised the rules regulating free agency, Hwaseung OZ made Lee an offer of 140,000,000 won (US$112,420) a year to renew his contract. During the bidding period, Lee expressed interest in remaining within Hwaseung Oz because of the friendships he had forged over the past three years on the team.

Although his father publicly stated in interviews that retirement was a possibility, Lee renegotiated his contract with Hwaseung Oz and confirmed that he would play for the team in the upcoming Proleague season.

==== Hwaseung Oz Disbands ====
In August 2011, Hwaseung decided to stop sponsoring Oz to shift their priorities over to physical sports. This left Jaedong, and several other notable progamers without a team as FOX and Hero also closed down. However, in the first days of November it was revealed the governing body of esports in Korea, KeSPA, had decided to form a team. It was announced Lee along with several other progamers from the closed down teams, would move to the new team. Notable gamers to also join the new team included Yum "Sea" Bo Sung, Jun "BaBy" Tae Yang and Park "Killer" Joon Oh.

=== StarCraft II ===
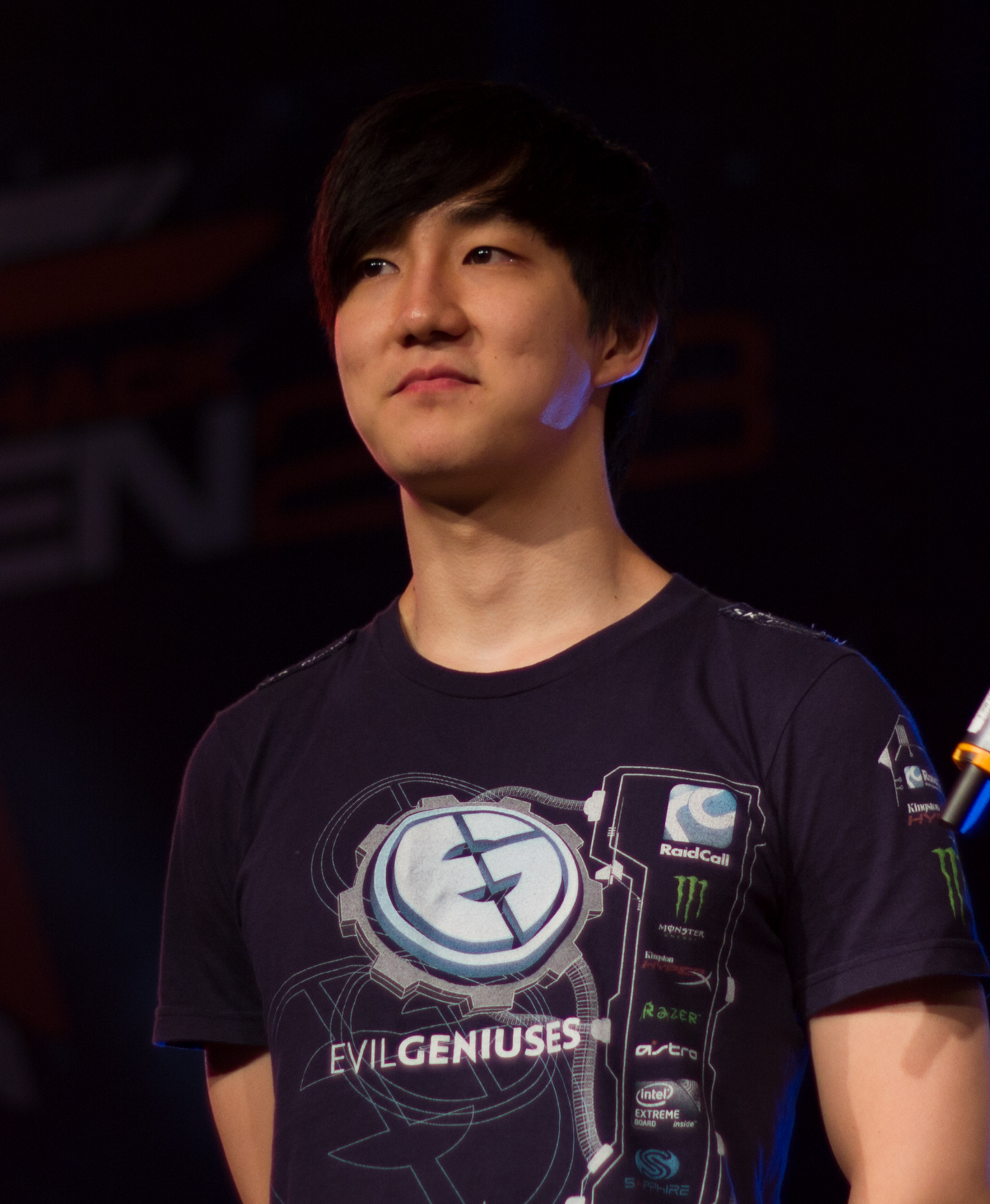
Jaedong at DreamHack Valencia 2013, representing Evil Geniuses

In late 2011, following the disbandment of Hwaseung Oz, Lee retired from StarCraft: Brood War and shifted his focus to competitive StarCraft II. Jaedong began his StarCraft II career with 8th Team, now known as team Jin Air Green Wings, in November 2011.

Jaedong was chosen as one of the KeSPA (Korea e-Sports Association) players to be seeded in Code S for the 2012 GSL Season 4 due to his performance in the 2011-2012 Proleague Season 2 in the KeSPA. He made his GSL debut on Wednesday, 5 September. He would go 0–2 in his group, thus dropping to Code A. In Code A Jaedong would go 0-2 again, ending his GSL debut. Jaedong was picked up by the successful North American team Evil Geniuses on 5 December 2012.

He was named the 2012 Most Valuable Player of the 2011-2012 Proleague Season 2's regular-season

With Evil Geniuses, Jaedong enjoyed a four-year career that saw him participating in fifteen premier tournaments as well as in KeSPA's Proleague. Throughout 2013, Jaedong proved to be one of the game's most consistent players, earning several silver medals in premier tournaments, most notably the 2013 StarCraft World Championship. After 5 second-place finishes in premier tournaments, Jaedong finally emerged victorious at ASUS ROG NorthCon 2013. His next and final premier tournament victory came in September 2014 at the World E-sport Championships, where he defeated Team Liquid's Snute in the Grand Finals.

Jaedong announced his retirement from professional gaming on 1 November 2016 at the age of 26. Evil Geniuses closed their StarCraft II division in the beginning of 2017 as well.

After retirement, he returned to streaming StarCraft: Brood War on AfreecaTV where he still enjoys considerable popularity among StarCraft fans.

== Health issues ==
In 2017, it was reported that Jaedong has various health issues. His wrists have sustained damage from years of playing and doctors have urged him to stop playing. He was quoted as saying "I've been playing for 15 years now. My body is wearing out."
