= Park Jung-suk =

Park Jung-suk (Korean: 박정석) is a Korean name consisting of the family name Park and the given name Jung-suk, and may also refer to:

- Park Jung-suk (footballer) (born 1977), South Korean footballer
- Park Jung-suk (video gamer) (born 1983), South Korean StarCraft player
