= Ongamenet Starleague =

South Korean StarCraft individual league

- The emblem of Ongamenet Starleague
- Sport: StarCraft: Brood War; StarCraft II
- Founded: 2000
- Folded: 2012
- Owner: Ongamenet
- Last champion: Heo "JangBi" Yeong Moo
- Most titles: 3: Lee "NaDa" Yun-yeol; Park "JulyZerg" Sung-joon; Lee Jae Dong; Lee "Flash" Young-ho
- Broadcaster: Ongamenet
- Related competitions: MBCGame StarCraft League

The Starleague, or the Ongamenet Starleague (OSL), was a professional South Korean StarCraft individual league run by Ongamenet. It first ran StarCraft: Brood War competitions but transitioned to StarCraft II: Wings of Liberty after that game's release. The Starleague was broadcast on Korean cable television. The league folded after the 2012 season.

== History of Starleague ==
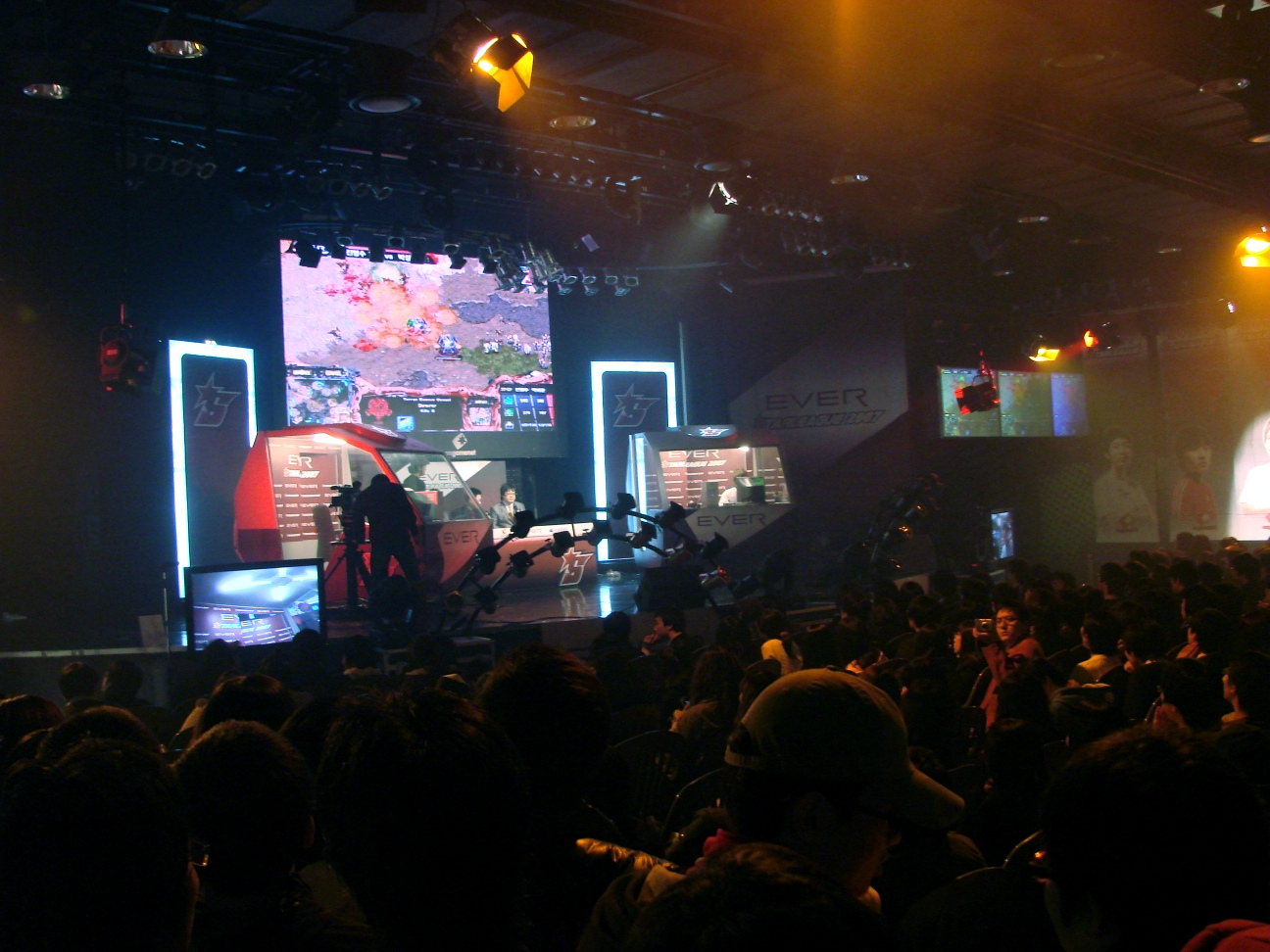
2007 EVER OSL match

Starleague started out as a program on Tooniverse, following the immense popularity of StarCraft in Korea, and the success of broadcast-gaming on other Korean channels. In 2000, Starleague was spun off into a gaming-dedicated channel, OnGameNet.

Starleague started out modestly, with a small prize sum and a few cult followers. In its seven-year history, it has evolved into a major sport in Korea, with more viewers than most other professional sports. Recently in the related Proleague finals, 120,000 fans came out to watch the match between SK Telecom T1 and KT Rolster. Finals for Starleague now regularly attract more than 50,000 fans, and viewed nationwide on television by millions. Famous gamers like Lim Yo Hwan (Boxer) have more than 500,000 registered fans. Pro gamers are organized into teams supported by major Korean firms, and prizes, contracts, and endorsements are now huge in comparison to even 3 or 4 years ago.

Starleague started to attract major attention with the rise of the "Boxer Terran" in the HanbitSoft Starleague in 2001. Professional gamer Lim Yo Hwan swept the scene with a 3:0 victory against Jang Jin Nam, using a rare race at the time (Terran) and using the Terran dropship. Boxer continued to win the next league, Coca-Cola Starleague, against Hong Jin-ho (Yellow), and ended up 2nd to Kim Dong Soo (Garimto) in the 2001 Sky Starleague. By this time, first-prize was 20,000,000 Korean Won, about US$20,000.

Starleague became so popular that it began to attract several foreign players, including Elky (Bertrand Grospellier) from France and Grrrr... (Guillaume Patry) from Canada.

Starleague started to gain its own "color" with the 2003 MyCube Starleague, with a distinctive red, black, and white emblem and a much more polished opening computer-generated cinematic. Prize money by this time was more than double the amount in the 2001 Coca-Cola championships, and regular games started to attract more people, with a refurbishing of the Ongamenet studio.

In the start of 2003, with the rise of pro gaming teams and their popularity, Ongamenet decided to create a spin-off of the Starleague, simply named 'Proleague', in which pro teams play against each other for the championship title. These pro leagues go at least twice as long as a normal Starleague.

The winner of 3 OSLs receives a special award called "The Golden Mouse". Until this day 4 players have accomplished that: Lee Yun Yeol (NaDa), winner of the 2002 Panasonic Starleague, 2004 IOPS Starleague, and 2006 Shinhan Bank Starleague; Park Sung-Joon (JulyZerg), winner of the 2004 Gillette Starleague, 2005 EVER Starleague, and 2008 EVER Starleague; Lee Jae Dong (Jaedong), winner of the 2007 EVER Starleague, 2009 Batoo Starleague, and 2009 Bacchus Starleague; and Lee Young-Ho (Flash), winner of the 2008 Bacchus Starleague, winner of the 2009 EVER Starleague, and 2010 Korean Air 2 Starleague. Winners of 5 OSLs and 7 OSLs will receive the "Platinum Mouse" and the "Diamond Mouse," respectively. No player has achieved this as of today.

On June 5, 2012, it was officially announced that the 34th Starleague, TVing Starleague, will be the last Starleague that uses StarCraft: Brood War. It was announced that the next Starleague will be held using StarCraft II: Wings of Liberty.

== StarCraft: BroodWar League champions ==
Year	Name of tournament	Winner	Result of final	Runner-up
2000	Hanaro Telecom Tooniverse Starleague	Guillaume "XD's~Grrrr..." Patry (U2U4)	3–2	Kang "H.O.T.-Forever" Do Kyung (SM)
2000	Freechall OnGameNet Starleague	Kim "GARIMTO" Dong Su (SM)	3–0	Bong "SKELTON" Jun Gu (Hanaro Telecom)
2001	HanbitSoft OnGameNet Starleague	Lim "BoxeR"' Yo Hwan (IS)	3–0	Jang "Jinnam" Jin Nam (KISS)
2001	Coca-Cola OnGameNet Starleague	Lim "BoxeR"' Yo Hwan (IS)	3–2	Hong "[NC]...YellOw" Jin Ho (Gamei)
2001	SKY OnGameNet Starleague	Kim "GARIMTO" Dong Su (Hanbit)	3–2	Lim "SlayerS 'BoxeR"' Yo Hwan (IS)
2002	NATE OnGameNet Starleague	Byun "Sync" Gil Sub (Hanbit)	3–2	Kang "H.O.T.-Forever" Do Kyung (Hanbit)
2002	SKY OnGameNet Starleague	Park "Reach" Jung Seok (Hanbit)	3–1	Lim "SlayerS_'BoxeR"' Yo Hwan (IS)
2002	Panasonic OnGameNet Starleague	Lee "NaDa" Yun Yeol (KTF)	3–2	Cho "ChOJJa"Yong Ho (SOUL)
2003	Olympus OnGameNet Starleague	Seo "XellOs" Ji Hun (GO)	3–2	Hong "[NC]...YellOw" Jin Ho (KTF)
2003	MyCube OnGameNet Starleague	Park "KingdOm" Yong Wook (Orion)	3–1	Kang "Nal_rA" Min (GO)
2003	NHN Hangame OnGameNet Starleague	Kang "Nal rA" Min (GO)	3–1	Chun "Zeus" Tae Kyu (KOR)
2004	Gillette Starleague	Park "JulyZerg" Sung Joon (POS)	3–1	Park "[Oops]Reach" Jung Seok (KTF)
2004	EVER Starleague	Choi "iloveoov" Yeon-Sung (SKT)	3–2	Lim "SlayerS_'BoxeR"' Yo Hwan (SKT)
2004	IOPS Starleague	Lee "NaDa" Yun Yeol (PANTECH)	3–0	Park "JulyZerg" Sung Joon (POS)
2005	EVER Starleague	Park "JulyZerg" Sung Joon (POS)	3–2	Lee "GoodFrienD" Byung Min (PANTECH)
2005	So1 Starleague	Oh "AnyTime..[gm]" Young Jong (PLUS)	3–2	Lim "SlayerS_'BoxeR"' Yo Hwan (SKT)
2005	Shinhan Bank Starleague	Choi "iloveoov" Yeon-Sung	3–0	Park "JulyZerg" Sung Joon (POS)
2006	Shinhan Bank Starleague season 1	Han "Casy" Dong Wook (OnGameNet)	3–1	Cho "ChOJJa" Yong Ho (KTF)
2006	Shinhan Bank Starleague season 2	Lee "NaDa" Yun Yeol (PANTECH)	3–2	Oh "AnyTime..[gm]" Young Jong (Lecaf OZ)
2006	Shinhan Bank Starleague season 3	Ma "sAviOr" Jae-Yoon (CJ)	3–1	Lee "NaDa"Yun Yeol (PANTECH)
2007	Daum Starleague	Kim "GGPlay" Jun Young (Hanbit)	3–2	Byun "Iris[gm]" Hyung Tae (CJ Entus)
2007	EVER Starleague	Lee "Jaedong" Jae Dong (Lecaf OZ)	3–1	Song "Stork[gm]" Byung Goo (Samsung KHAN)
2008	Bacchus Starleague	Lee "FlaSh" Young Ho (KTF MagicNs)	3–0	Song "Stork[gm]" Byung Goo (Samsung KHAN)
2008	EVER Starleague	Park "JulyZerg" Sung Joon (STX)	3–0	Do "BeSt[WHITE]" Jae Wook (SKT T1)
2008	Incruit Starleague	Song "Stork" Byung Goo (Samsung KHAN)	3–2	Jung "By.Fantasy" Myung Hoon (SKT T1)
2008	BATOO Starleague	Lee "Jaedong" Jae Dong (Lecaf OZ)	3–2	Jung "By.Fantasy" Myung Hoon (SKT T1)
2009	Bacchus Starleague	Lee "Jaedong" Jae Dong (Hwaseung OZ)	3–0	Park "YellOw[ArnC]" Myung Soo (hite SPARKYZ)
2009	EVER Starleague	Lee "FlaSh" Young Ho (KT Rolster)	3–1	Jin "Movie" Young Hwa (CJ Entus)
2010	Korean Air Starleague season 1	Kim "Effort" Jung Woo (CJ Entus)	3–2	Lee "FlaSh" Young Ho (KT Rolster)
2010	Korean Air Starleague season 2	Lee "FlaSh" Young Ho (KT Rolster)	3–1	Lee "Jaedong" Jae Dong (Hwaseung OZ)
2010	Bacchus Starleague	Jung "By.Fantasy" Myung Hoon (SK Telecom T1)	3–0	Song "Stork" Byung Goo (Samsung Khan)
2011	Jin Air Starleague	Heo "JangBi" Yeong Moo (Samsung Khan)	3–2	Jung "By.Fantasy" Myung Hoon (SK Telecom T1)
2012	Tving Starleague	Heo "JangBi" Yeong Moo (Samsung Khan)	3–1	Jung "By.Fantasy" Myung Hoon (SK Telecom T1)

== StarCraft II: Wings of Liberty league champions ==
Only one OSL was run during the lifespan of Wings of Liberty due to OGN's late switch to StarCraft II.

Year	Name of tournament	Winner	Result of final	Runner-up
2012	Auction All-Kill Starleague	Jung "Rain" Yoon Jong (SK Telecom T1)	4–1	Park "DongRaeGu" Soo Ho (MvP)

== StarCraft II: Heart of the Swarm league champions ==
Year	Name of tournament	Winner	Result of final	Runner-up
2013	Auction All-Kill Starleague	Cho "Maru" Sung Choo (Prime)	4–2	Jung "Rain" Yoon Jong (SK Telecom T1)

== League brackets ==
=== 2009 Bacchus OSL ===
Quarterfinals		Semifinals		Finals
YellOw[ArnC]	2
go.go	1	YellOw[ArnC]	3
type-b	2	type-b	0
Leta	1			YellOw[ArnC]	0
fantasy	2			Jaedong	3
Canata	0	fantasy	1
ZerO	0	Jaedong	3
Jaedong	2

=== 2009 Ever OSL ===
Quarterfinals		Semifinals		Finals
Flash (T)	2
Jaedong (Z)	0	Flash (T)	3
Calm (Z)	2	Calm (Z)	1
Pure (P)	0			Flash (T)	3
Movie (P)	2			Movie (P)	1
Zero (Z)	0	Movie (P)	3
Shine (Z)	2	Shine (Z)	1
Stork (P)	1

=== 2010 Korean Air OSL ===
Quarterfinals		Semifinals		Finals
FlaSh (T)	2
BaBy (T)	0	FlaSh (T)	3
Movie (P)	0	Pure (P)	0
Pure (P)	2			FlaSh (T)	2
ZerO (Z)	0			EffOrt (Z)	3
EffOrt (Z)	2	Effort (Z)	3
Kal (P)	2	Kal (P)	0
fOrGG (T)	1

=== 2010 Korean Air OSL season 2 ===
Quarterfinals		Semifinals		Finals
Action (Z)	0
Jaedong (Z)	2	Jaedong (Z)	3
Sea (T)	0	Stork (P)	2
Stork (P)	2			Jaedong (Z)	1
ZerO (Z)	0			Flash (T)	3
Free (P)	2	Free (P)	1
Flash (T)	2	Flash (T)	3
Leta (T)	0

=== 2010 Bacchus OSL ===
Quarterfinals		Semifinals		Finals
Hyuk	0
Fantasy	2	Fantasy	3
Calm	2	Calm	2
Mind	1			Fantasy	3
Modesty	2			Stork	0
Kal	1	Modesty	0
HiyA	1	Stork	3
Stork	2

=== 2011 Jin Air OSL ===
Quarterfinals		Semifinals		Finals
Fantasy	2
Hyuk	0	Fantasy	3
By.Hydra	2	By.Hydra	1
Modesty	1			Fantasy	2
n.die_soO	2			Dream.t)Jangbi	3
Sea.Baxter	1	n.die_soO	0
Dream.t)Jangbi	2	Dream.t)Jangbi	3
Flash	1

=== 2012 tving OSL ===
Quarterfinals		Semifinals		Finals
Dream.t)JangBi	3
Ever)P(mini	1	Dream.t)JangBi	3
MenSol[ZerO]	3	MenSol[ZerO]	2
hyvaa[S.G]	1			Dream.t)JangBi	3
By.Fantasy	3			By.Fantasy	1
n.Die_soO	0	By.Flash	0
Shine[kaL]	1	By.Fantasy	3
By.Flash	3

== See also ==
- StarCraft professional competition
- MBCgame Starleague
