= Bisu =

Bisu or BISU may refer to:

- Bisu (festival), a festival celebrated in South Canara region in Karnataka and Kerala as New year, India
- Bisu (marque), a Chinese automotive brand.
- Beijing International Studies University, a Chinese university in Chaoyang District, Beijing, China
- Bohol Island State University, a public university in the Philippines
- Bes or Bisu, an Egyptian deity
- Bisu, the alias of Kim Taek-Yong (born 1989), professional StarCraft player from South Korea
- Bisu language, a language of the Sino-Tibetan family
- Ingrid Bisu (born 1987), actress and producer
