= Reach (gamer) =

South Korean esports player

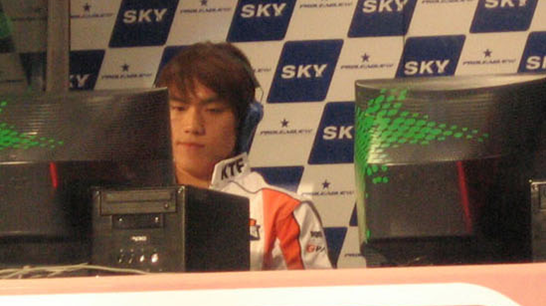

Personal information
- Name: 박정석 (Park Jung-suk)
- Born: 27 December 1983 (age 42)
- Nationality: Republic of Korea

Career information
- Games: StarCraft; League of Legends
- Role: Protoss

Team history
- ???? - ????: Hanbit Stars
- ???? - 2008: KTF MagicNs
- 2008 - 2010: Air Force ACE
- 2010 - 2012: KT Rolster

Park Jung-suk (born 27 December 1983), also known as Reach or [Oops]Reach, is a professional South Korean StarCraft player.

Park, who also goes by the usernames Six_Devil_nO.1, ChoGoSy or TechniCal, is recognized as one of the best Protoss players in the world, an accomplishment for which he has been nicknamed "Hero Toss". He is skillful at macromanagement and does successful psionic storms and dragoon dancing, but plays relatively inconsistently against Zerg. He won the 2002 Sky Ongamenet StarLeague, beating SlayerS `BoxeR` with a 3–1 score. He uses a Logitech optical mini (a gift from his fanclub) and Samsung DT-35 Black keyboard.

Park was the first player to achieve 100 Proleague victories, an accomplishment commemorated when he and Lee Jaedong (the second player to reach that benchmark) formed prints of their mouse-controlling hands in clay in a September 2009 ceremony.

Park is now a coach for League of Legends and Tekken team NaJin e-mFire in Korea.

== Tournament results ==
- 1st place, 2002 SKY Starleague (KSL)
- 2nd place, 2002 Pepsi Twist 2nd KPGA TOUR (KPGA later became known as MSL)
- 4th place, 2003 Mycube Starleague (OSL)
- 2nd place, 2004 Gilette Starleague (OSL)
- 2nd place, 2005 UZOO MSL
