= Actions per minute =

Frequency unit

Actions per minute, abbreviated to APM, is a term used in video games, particularly real-time strategy and fighting games which refers to the total number of actions that a player can perform in a minute. Actions per minute are the number of actions (such as selecting units or issuing an order) completed within a minute of gameplay in real-time strategy games, most notably in StarCraft. High APM is often associated with skill, as it can indicate that a player both knows what to do in the game and has the manual dexterity to carry it out. Software has been developed to analyze players' APM in these games. Beginners often have low APM counts, typically below 50. Professional e-athletes in South Korea usually have average APM scores around 250-350, but often exceed the 400 mark during intense battle sequences. Notable gamers with over 400 average APM include Lee Jae-Dong, and Kim "EffOrt" Jung Woo, who is the Brood War player with the highest average APM to win a major individual league. While Park Sung-Joon is noted for the record APM of 818, this was measured only during a short time in a game and was probably the result of spamming or holding a key down. Given that a large part of the APM score are repetitions of orders already given, APM is not always considered an accurate indication of skill.

== Origin ==
The term APM originates from StarCraft, and was popularised after the development of a large number of community tools allowing observers of game matches to view player resources and "actions per minute", which was used as a metric in determining a player's skill. After the release of StarCraft II: Wings of Liberty, many of these metrics were built into the game's interface, including APM, which further popularised the term's usage and served to increase the competitiveness of the game, however, the way APM is measured is slightly different in Brood War remastered than in other softwares, like BWChart, and results in slightly different values (typically higher in ingame Starcraft).

== Speed and efficiency in APM ==
A player's APM value is determined by the number of actions performed in a given minute. Some actions, such as repeated selection, are easier to carry out than others, and players may repeatedly perform (or "spam") these actions, making them redundant in terms of their usefulness. "Spamming" may be used as a way to warm up and maintain speed for later phases of the game, or it may be used simply to increase a player's recorded APM in order to improve the perception of their gameplay skills. Because of this, more sophisticated measures of APM may attempt to filter out redundant actions by means such as ignoring re-selection of a group of units which was already selected and ignoring the very beginning of the game (when the typical relative lack of action facilitates spamming), in order to only measure a player's "efficient/effective" APM value. The eAPM (effective APM) measure was first introduced by the BWRepInfo software, which intends to remove the repeated actions from the action list count. This method has been applied by other softwares later, however, there is currently no standardization of what constitutes an "effective action" and APM is therefore typically recorded without any filtering.

== Accuracy in APM ==
Accuracy is another factor related to a player's APM. Accuracy is the coordination of precise mouse clicks and keystrokes. Greater accuracy will result in fewer mis-clicks and mis-strokes; thus the player's efficiency increases with greater accuracy, meaning the APM is a more accurate measurement statistic.
