= KPGA =

KPGA may refer to:

- KPGA (FM), a radio station (91.9 FM) licensed to Morton, Texas, United States
- Page Municipal Airport (ICAO code KPGA)
- KPGA Championship, organised by the Korea Professional Golfers' Association (KPGA)
- MBCGame StarCraft League KPGA Tour, former Korea e-sports competition
