= Flash (gamer) =

South Korean esports player (born 1992)

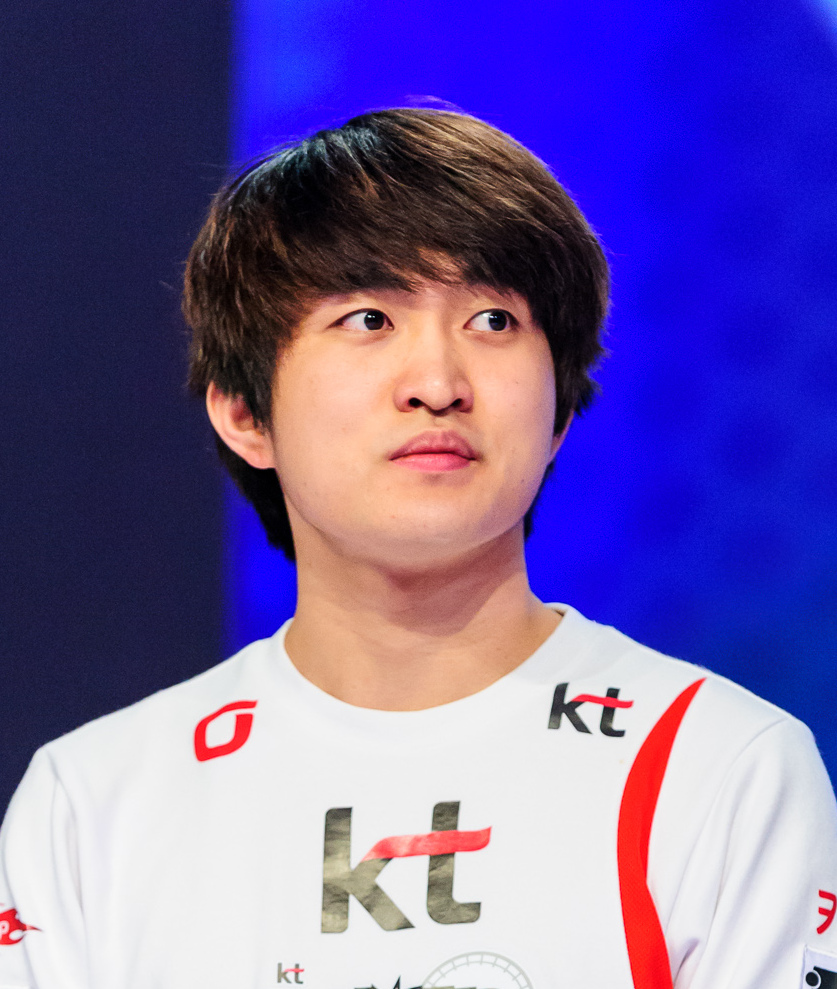
- Lee in 2013

Personal information
- Name: 이영호 (Lee Young-ho)
- Nicknames: The Ultimate Weapon; God
- Born: July 5, 1992 (age 34)
- Nationality: South Korean

Career information
- Games: StarCraft; StarCraft II
- Playing career: 2007–present
- Role: Terran (Note: Formerly Random)

Team history
- 2007–2015: KT Rolster

Career highlights and awards
- WCG champion (2010); IEM champion (2014 Toronto); 3x OSL champion (2008, 2009, 2010); 3x MSL champion (2010, 2011); 4x ASL champion (2016, 2017, 2019)
Medal record
Esports
Representing South Korea
Asian Indoor and Martial Arts Games
Gold medal – first place	2009 Vietnam	StarCraft: Brood War
Silver medal – second place	2013 South Korea	StarCraft II: Heart of the Swarm

Lee Young-ho (Korean: 이영호; Hanja: 李泳浩; born July 5, 1992) is a South Korean StarCraft: Brood War and StarCraft II player who played Terran for the Korean pro-gaming team KT Rolster under the alias By.FlaSh or simply Flash.

Flash is widely considered to be the greatest StarCraft: Brood War player of all-time. Alongside BoxeR, NaDa, Iloveoov, and SAviOr, Lee is considered the fifth "Bonjwa", a title reserved for players who dominated the Korean Brood War scene for long periods of time.

He made his debut as a StarCraft: Brood War player in 2007 and retired on December 19, 2015. Lee began playing StarCraft II competitively in 2011, until his retirement in December 2015. He subsequently returned to playing Starcraft: Brood War, and started his personal broadcast in February 2016 on the AfreecaTV personal broadcasting platform. Since returning to Brood War, Lee has won first place in Seasons 2, 3, 4, and 8 of the Afreeca Starleague. As of 2020, he is still broadcasting personal broadcasts.

== Career ==
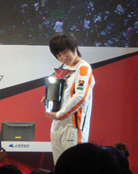
Flash with the Bacchus OSL Trophy

Lee joined KT Rolster in 2007 at the age of 14 as a StarCraft: Brood War player. In his rookie debut at the Daum OnGameNet Starleague (OSL) of 2007, he defeated the MSL champion Kim "Bisu" Taek-yong to reach the final four, before losing to the eventual champion Kim "GGPlay" Joon Yung. He won the KeSPA Rookie of the Year award that year. In March 2008, he won both the GOMTV Star Invitational and the Bacchus OSL, defeating Song "Stork" Byung-goo in both finals. His Bacchus OSL title made him the youngest OSL champion of all time. In 2010, Lee reached the finals of eight major events, winning five of them. In 2011, Lee underwent surgery on his right arm due to repetitive strain on his muscles. By September 2012, Lee had won 17 major tournaments and broke StarCraft's elo record six times, with all previous elo records being held by Lee himself.

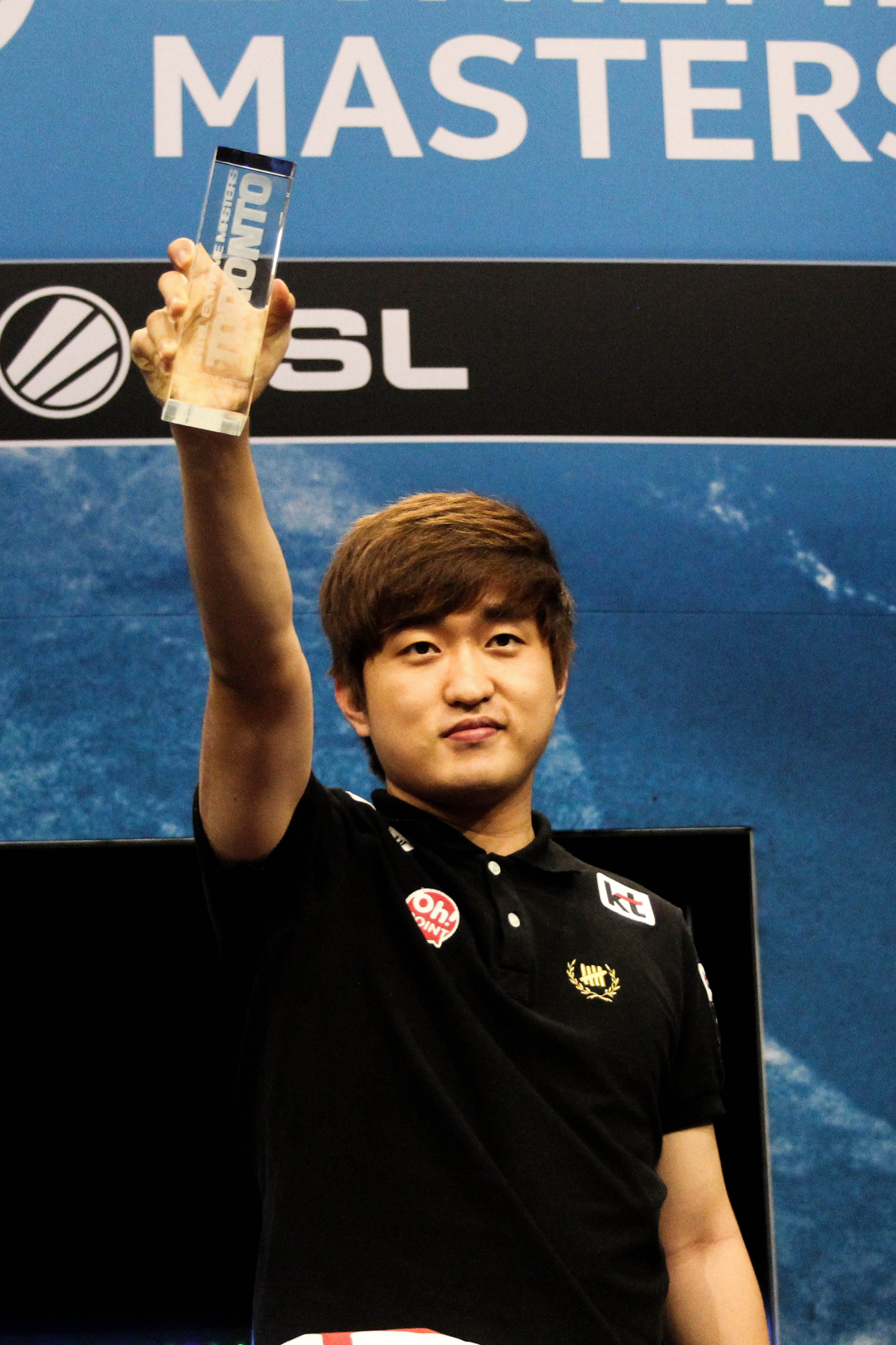
Flash after winning IEM Toronto 2014

In 2012, Lee switched to playing StarCraft II competitively. He won his first StarCraft II major event in 2014, after winning Intel Extreme Masters Toronto. The same year, he led KT Rolster to a proleague title. Lee announced his retirement on December 1, 2015. At that point in is career, he had a nearly 80% win rate in Brood War and had spent multiple years at the top of KeSPA's official rankings.

He subsequently returned to playing Starcraft: Brood War, and started his personal broadcast in February 2016 in Afreeca (personal broadcasting platform). Lee would go on to win the Afreeca Season 2 Starleague later that year. In 2017, Lee competed in the Afreeca Season 3 Starleague and won first place. In 2017, Lee won the ' Golden Trophy ' for three straight seasons in ASL alone. At the Olympic Stadium in Hanyang University, Seongdong-gu, Seoul on Friday, Lee defeated Cho Il-jang 3:1 in the final match-up of the KT GiGA Internet Afreeca Star League (ASL) season 4. He won the championship three times in a row. Lee won a substantial amount of money by achieving a milestone that he failed to make during his career as a professional gamer. Lee Young-ho hit the 100 million won accumulated in ASL alone. In 2018, in the finals of the "Olleh TV Afreeca TV Star League (ASL) Season 6", Lee was defeated by Kim Jung-woo (Effort). Kim Jung-woo also won in OSL finals against Lee Young-ho (FlaSh) in 2010, in a famous comeback, by 3:2. In 2019, Lee skipped the 7th season of ASL due to his arm injury. He took a long break skipping all major tournaments (ASL season7 and all KSL seasons). Fortunately, his arm got better and he competed in the following ASL, Season 8, where he won his 4th ASL against Jang Yoon-chul (Snow) (4-0).

In April 2020, Lee announced that he would switch his race and play future seasons of ASL as Random, rather than as Terran. By selecting Random as his race, Lee will have a one in three chance of playing either Protoss, Zerg, or Terran in any match. He played the remainder of ASL Season 9, as well as the Afreeca StarCraft Team League (ASTL) as Terran. He played his first match as random at the "[T.E.N.] FlaSh Random Match" event. There, he lost to BeSt 2–1, and ZerO 2–1, while defeating Bisu 2–0.

On October 20, 2024, Lee announced he would be returning to regular StarCraft streaming in a prerecorded video which was livestreamed on SOOP. (Note: Original broadcast (in Korean), unofficial English translation)

In 2026, Lee played in the 21st season of SOOP's ASL tournament series. This marked Lee's first professional stage appearance since his return to Brood War, with previous appearances postponed due to repetitive strain injuries. Lee managed to advance all the way to the finals, defeating Sn0w in a close 3-2 set in the Round of 8 and Light in a dominant 4-0 set in the Semifinals before eventually falling to Soma in a close 4-3 set.

== Player profile ==
When he first emerged as a professional gamer, Lee received criticism for his use of gimmicky "rush" strategies. However, he soon developed a versatile and well-rounded play style which revolved around strong mechanics, defensive play, and exemplary late-game army control. Choi "iloveoov" Yeon-sung had praised Lee's strategic depth, saying that "there aren't many players who set strategic moves, and in the case of [Lee], I think he's looking about 10 games ahead." Lee is known for his well-optimized gameplay, defined by strict resource management and precise timings. | team1 = Faker's Fan Club

== Cryptocurrency scandal ==
Lee and other prominent gamers and streamers, including fellow Starcraft player Bisu, were caught up in a cryptocurrency scandal in 2021. Lee was paid by the creator of a new cryptocurrency T.ocoin, and Lee subsequently publicly talked up investing in that cryptocurrency, without disclosing the payment. Lee has published a public apology. In 2024, Lee addressed his involvement in the scandal, claiming that he himself had been conned out of ₩1 billion (equivalent to ₩1.14 billion or US$848,801.49 in 2025) when the creators of T.ocoin used his money to pay back the investments of other gamers and streamers.

== Injuries ==
Lee experiences chronic pain from repetitive strain injuries affecting his wrist and arm, which has led him to undergo multiple corrective nerve decompression surgeries and repeated painkiller injections. Lee has said that he believes most Korean StarCraft professionals experience wrist pain, and has described being pressured by fans to keep playing even when his arm was hurting.

== See also ==
- StarCraft in esports
