= Nal rA =

South Korean game player and commentator

Nal_rA
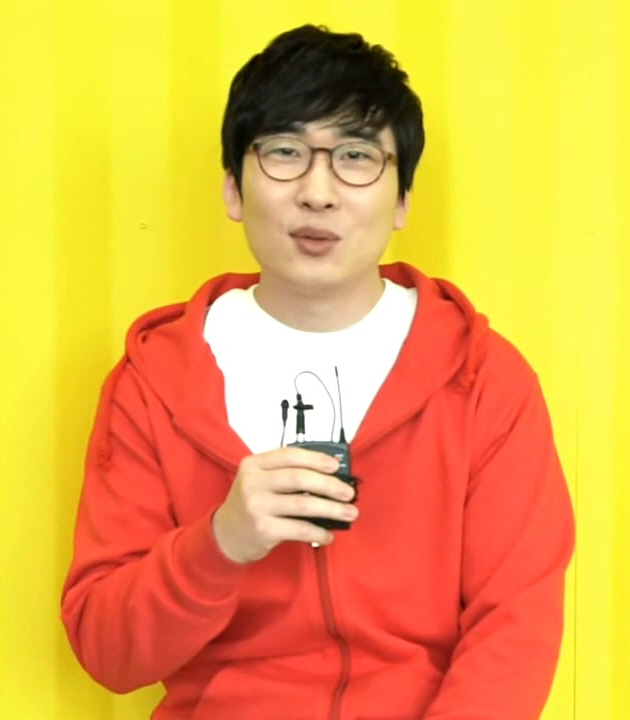
- Kang in 2016

Personal information
- Name: Kang Min
- Born: March 15, 1982 (age 44); Anyang, Gyeonggi Province, South Korea

Career information
- Games: StarCraft
- Playing career: 2002–2008

Team history
- 2002–2004: OGN Entus
- 2004–2010: KT Rolster

Korean name
- Hangul: 강민
- Hanja: 姜旼
- RR: Gang Min
- MR: Kang Min

Kang Min (born March 15, 1982), also known as Nal_rA, is a South Korean former professional StarCraft player and League of Legends commentator. Since retiring from gaming, he has worked as an instructor at Seoul Institute of the Arts.

Kang had relatively long career in StarCraft, spanning victories in both major leagues and seeing his team to a 23-game winning streak. He is considered one of the "Three Kings" of Protoss.

Once during a live match, he suddenly asked the game observers to pause the game because he had to blow his nose and asked for a tissue. Not surprisingly, the commentators laughed out loud because of this incident. Ever since that incident, he has been affectionately known as 'Snot Toss'.

Kang Min was once disqualified during a match in SKY Proleague 05–06. He accidentally paused the game in an attempt to change the volume. The referees deemed this as a disqualification.

== Career ==
Kang Min's first appearance in a major tournament was the PGR21 tournament where he met very strong opponents and made his way to the final, but lost to Seo Ji Hun (Xellos[yG]). However then Kang Min participated in the same tournament once again and beat Seo Ji Hun. Another success followed at the end of 2002, where Kang Min qualified for Olympus Challenge League. He showed great skill and reached the finals, but lost again to his great rival, Kingdom. After that he showed some magnificent performance in the MBC StarLeague, winning it and beating Lee Yun-Yeol ([Red]Nada) in the finals. Later he showed master class again, reaching the finals, where he met Jeon Tae Kyu (Zeus). Kang Min reached 2nd place in Korea Pro Game Association rating in April 2004. In February 2006, Kang Min became the winner of the Blizzard Entertainment World Wide Invitational ("WWI") tournament. In July 2006, he became a winner of the 2nd prize in the MBC StarLeague.

Kang Min is most well known for his inventive and creative plays. He is credited for popularizing both the cannon rush and the forge expand, both of which were not yet used widely in the game at the time.

One of his most memorable matches ever seen on TV was the 'Arbiter Reloaded' play where he was playing against the Terran player GoodFriend and used Arbiter Hallucinations in order to successfully use its recall ability . The match was ranked number 1 in MBCGame's top 100 matches.

Kang Min, former On-Gamenet League of Legend commentator, declared freelance. " I will meet with my fans in various sports, " Kang said on Sunday while working as a freelancer, not as an on-game net.

On September 11, 2008, he announced that he would retire from pro-gaming. He felt that he was not able to meet the expectations of his fans regarding his performance in professional StarCraft games and that he intends to be a professional StarCraft commentator in the future. He has since announced his intention to cease commenting on MBCGame and take up a career in teaching pro-gaming related courses at the Seoul Institute of the Arts.

== Tournament results ==
- 1st — PGR21 tournament
- 2nd — Olympus Challenge League
- 1st — MBC StarLeague
