= Kingdom (gamer) =

South Korean pro-gamer (born 1983)

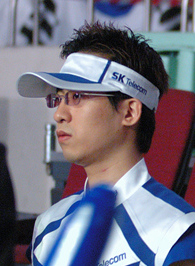
- Park at the 2004 Gillette OSL

Personal information
- Name: Park Yong-wook
- Born: 6 December 1983 (age 42)
- Nationality: South Korea

Career information
- Games: StarCraft
- Role: Protoss

Team history
- SK Telecom T1

Korean name
- Hangul: 박용욱
- Hanja: 朴龍旭
- RR: Bak Yonguk
- MR: Pak Yonguk

Park Yong-wook (born 6 December 1983) is a former South Korean professional StarCraft player who played under the alias Kingdom. He has since retired to become a commentator.

Kingdom, nicknamed "Devil Toss," was one of the world's best Protoss versus Protoss players and is known for his technical unit control. He won a single Ongamenet Starleague (OSL). He fell out of the top 20 players in 2006, and retired with an arm injury. He was briefly a coach of the SK Telecom T1 team but has since left to become a commentator.

== Tournament results ==
- 1st — 2003 MyCube OnGameNet Starleague

== See also ==
- StarCraft professional competition
