= Zerg =

Fictional alien race

- StarCraft race
- Sarah Kerrigan leads a Zerg attack force, which consists of individual Zerg units from multiple strains, in promotional artwork for StarCraft II.
- First appearance: Starcraft (1998)
- Genre: Military science fiction

In-universe information
- Home world: Zerus
- Base of operations: Char
- Type: Hive-minded virulent biological species

The Zerg Swarm are a fictional collective of extraterrestrial insectoid species in Blizzard Entertainment's StarCraft franchise. They are characterized by biological adaptation, genetic assimilation, viral endemic infestation, expendable units and a hive minded organization. Competing and contrasting with the human Terrans and technologically advanced Protoss, the Zerg serve as major antagonists in much of the series.

As with the other races of StarCraft, the Zerg are the subject of a full single-player campaign in the 1998 video game Starcraft and its expansion Brood War, and are the primary playable faction in StarCraft II: Heart of the Swarm. Zerg units are designed to be cost-efficient and fast to produce, encouraging players to overwhelm opponents through numerical advantage. New units are produced from larva emerging periodically from structures that serve as primary headquarters and resource gathering hub for the Zerg faction, while other Zerg structures unlock additional strains and upgrades. Several Zerg units also spread mutagens or use parasitic abilities, including the ability to assume control of enemy units or Terran structures and convert them into Zerg-controlled assets.

The Zerg have been discussed as one of the central examples of StarCraft's asymmetric faction design, and are often used as examples in broader discussions and analyses of video game balance and design. The terms "Zerg rush" and "zerging" have entered gaming vocabulary to describe sacrificing economic development in favor of using many cheap, yet weak units to overwhelm an enemy by attrition or sheer numbers.

== Concept and creation ==
The Zerg were designed as one of the three playable races in StarCraft, contrasting with the human Terrans and technologically advanced Protoss through an identity based on organic adaptation rather than machinery. The manual of the 1998 video game StarCraft describes the Zerg as a collective of assimilated species pursuing "genetic perfection", with their buildings, units, and starships represented as living organisms rather than manufactured technology. Originally called the "Nightmarish Invaders", they later became the "Zurg", and then renamed again to the current spelling to avoid any potential trademark conflicts with Pixar's Toy Story character of Emperor Zurg.

Zerg structures and units in an early alpha build of the 1998 video game StarCraft.

In the early alpha versions built of the game by Bob Fitch, their insect-inspired base was prominently shown, but their appearance was heavily dominated by spikes and bright shades of blue and purple. The Zerg would undergo changes to their visual design throughout the course of the development of StarCraft, having changed drastically from writer Chris Metzen's original concept art. This was primarily due to Blizzard's attempt to steer the game away from the visual appearance, unveiled at the 1996 E3, that had earned the game a derisive label of "Warcraft in space" or "Warcraft goes 'purple'".

During the development of StarCraft II, Blizzard emphasized that the visual design of each race needed to remain readable from the overhead perspective of a real-time strategy game. In a 2007 GameSpot report on a Blizzard art panel, senior art director Samwise Didier described Blizzard's art philosophy as built around strong silhouettes, exaggerated proportions, distinctive animations, and bold colors, so that units could be memorable and recognizable at a glance. The same panel used Zerg units such as Mutalisks and Zerglings to demonstrate animation variety, with GameSpot noting that a crowd of Zerglings appeared especially unsettling because their movement cycles did not simply repeat in unison.

The Zerg received a further visual overhaul before the release of StarCraft II: Wings of Liberty. PC Gamer reported in 2010 that the Zerg shown in earlier footage had used placeholder art, and that Didier's team was updating the race with new models and textures. Didier said the team wanted the Zerg to reach the level of polish expected from Blizzard, while still preserving readability in multiplayer. Although the team reduced some of the earlier saturated colors, he said the Zerg still needed to remain colorful enough for players to identify teams and units clearly during play. That redesign extended to both units and structures. Didier said Blizzard was revisiting Zerg buildings such as the hive, hatchery, upgrades, and Hydralisk den, while also polishing basic units such as the drone. The Infestor unit was also reworked after fans reacted negatively to its earlier model; Didier said the revised version retained elements players liked while making the creature appear more sinister and vicious.

StarCraft II: Heart of the Swarm further developed the Zerg as a narrative and visual subject. Lead writer Brian Kindregan told PC Gamer that the expansion was built around the idea of the Zerg constantly evolving by placing themselves in difficult environments, with adaptation and identity serving as the campaign's central themes. Kindregan described the Swarm itself as one of the story's two major characters, alongside Sarah Kerrigan, because both were defined by change, growth, and the search for a new identity. Kindregan also explained that the Zerg's pursuit of perfection was treated less as a fixed endpoint than as an evolutionary drive. He said Abathur understood perfection pragmatically, as being suited to a particular task, while the Zerg as a whole were still driven by a deeper idea of "purity of essence". This approach was reflected in the campaign's structure, where players could modify Zerg units through mutations and evolutions while Kerrigan rebuilt and reshaped the Swarm.

The expansion's art direction also pushed the Zerg toward more overtly monstrous designs. In a Kotaku feature on Heart of the Swarm concept art, Didier said Blizzard wanted to emphasize the game's "Zerg-iness", particularly through characters such as Izsha and Abathur. Didier described Izsha as a rational Zerg advisor whose partly human face was contrasted with a much more monstrous body, while Abathur was conceived as a horror-like mutation engineer, combining elements of creatures such as spiders, lampreys, and caterpillars. The same feature described how the expansion used new creatures and environments to reinforce Zerg assimilation. The neutral Yetis of the world Kaldir were designed to contrast with the Zerg's insectoid and reptilian qualities while also giving the Swarm a warm-blooded creature whose DNA could be absorbed. Didier also said the Leviathan's evolution chamber was intended to show the player's personalized Swarm and the evolutionary choices made during the campaign.

== Description ==
=== Background ===
Within the fiction of StarCraft, the Zerg are a collective of biologically engineered alien organisms driven by assimilation, mutation, and adaptation. Unlike the Terrans and Protoss, they make little use of mechanical technology. Their units, structures, and vessels are instead living organisms or biological extensions of the Swarm. Zerg colonies spread a living biomass called creep, which supports their structures and reinforces their organic visual identity.

Render of a hydralisk from the 1998 video game StarCraft; it is described in the manual as a strain created from the formerly peaceful Slothien species..

The Zerg originate from Zerus, where native lifeforms were able to absorb the essence of creatures they killed and transform themselves through biological adaptation. The mysterious Xel'Naga civilization later created the Overmind to unify and direct the Zerg, binding them into a hive mind and giving them a drive to assimilate useful species into the Swarm. Their goal of "genetic perfection" is pursued by absorbing desirable traits from other lifeforms and mutating assimilated species into specialized strains. Zerg evolution is depicted as rapid and deliberately selective. Zerg strains generate mutations, while weaker mutations are culled, allowing the Swarm to force adaptation across generations. The Zerg also expose themselves to harsh environments and assimilate strong species in order to strengthen the Swarm through natural selection. In StarCraft II: Heart of the Swarm, the evolution master Abathur treats perfection as an unreachable but tactically useful goal, emphasizing the Swarm's continual adaptation rather than any final evolutionary endpoint.

The Swarm is normally organized through a psionic hierarchy. In the original game, the Overmind controls the Zerg through cerebrates, intelligent commanders that appear as giant, bloated slug-larvae with numerous limbs protruding from the sides, to relay the Overmind's will and direct individual broods. Each cerebrate commands a brood with a particular military or evolutionary function, and further directs the Swarm through lesser command organisms such as overlords and queens. Cerebrates are depicted as unusually difficult to destroy because the Overmind can reincarnate them unless they are killed by dark templar energies. After the Overmind's death and the destruction of a second Overmind in StarCraft: Brood War, later games replace the cerebrates with broodmothers who command separate broods under Kerrigan.

The Zerg are often treated as expendable within their own military logic. Their social and military organization is repeatedly compared to insects such as ants or termites, with individual warriors valued less than the survival and expansion of the collective. In StarCraft: Speed of Darkness, the Swarm is described as treating the loss of thousands of warriors as acceptable if the exchange advances the Swarm's objectives.

Not all Zerg are bound to the Overmind's hive mind. Heart of the Swarm introduces the primal Zerg of Zerus, who share the Zerg's ability to absorb essence and evolve but remain individually sapient. Unlike the Swarm, primal Zerg follow leaders by choice or strength rather than genetic compulsion, and their independence makes them less vulnerable to attacks designed against the Zerg hive mind.

The two most important Zerg worlds are Zerus and Char. Zerus is the Zerg homeworld and the origin of the primal Zerg. Char, a volcanic world, becomes the Swarm's major base of operations after the events of the original StarCraft, and later serves as the site of the second Overmind and Kerrigan's control over the Swarm.

=== Gameplay depiction ===
In gameplay, the Zerg's biological identity is reflected through organic production, regeneration, creep, and centralized spawning. Zerg units and buildings are entirely biological and slowly regenerate over time. Zerg production is far more centralized than with the Terrans and Protoss; a hatchery must be utilized to spawn individual larvae from which most new Zerg units are hatched, with other structures providing the necessary technology tree assets, whereas the other two races can produce units from several structures.

Zerg units are generally cheaper and faster to produce than those of the Terrans or Protoss, encouraging players to overwhelm opponents through numbers rather than rely on individually powerful units. This design supports rush tactics and reinforces the faction's identity as a swarm.

Some Zerg units are capable of infesting enemies with various parasites that range from being able to see what an enemy unit sees to spawning Zerg inside an enemy unit. In addition, the Zerg can infest some Terran buildings, allowing for the production of special Terran units who have been genetically mutated into human/Zerg hybrids ("infested" in series lore).

== Appearances ==
The Zerg are one of the three playable races in StarCraft and are the focus of the game's second campaign. In the original game, they invade Terran space while seeking psionic potential that would help them confront the Protoss. Their campaign follows the rise of Sarah Kerrigan, the self-styled Queen of Blades, who becomes one of the Swarm's most important figures. The game ends with the Zerg invasion of Aiur and the destruction of the Overmind by the Protoss high templar Tassadar.

In StarCraft: Brood War, the Swarm is left unstable after the Overmind's death. Surviving cerebrates attempt to restore central control through a new Overmind, while the United Earth Directorate later captures and pacifies it. Kerrigan eventually destroys her rivals, eliminates the new Overmind, and takes command of the Swarm, leaving the Zerg as one of the dominant powers in the Koprulu sector.

In StarCraft II: Wings of Liberty, the Zerg appear primarily as antagonists while Jim Raynor's forces and the Terran Dominion pursue an ancient Xel'Naga artifact. The campaign culminates in an assault on Char, where the artifact is used to weaken the Swarm and restore Kerrigan to human form.

The Zerg become the primary playable faction and narrative focus of StarCraft II: Heart of the Swarm. The campaign follows Kerrigan as she rebuilds the scattered Swarm, reasserts control over rival broodmothers, encounters the primal Zerg on Zerus, and incorporates new evolutionary paths into the Swarm. The campaign culminates in a massive invasion on Arcturus Mengsk's Dominion throne world of Korhal. After Kerrigan kills Mengsk, the Zerg Swarm departs with her to an unknown corner of the universe in order to confront the threat of the being known as Amon. Its campaign mechanics also foreground the Zerg's evolutionary identity, allowing players to alter units through mutations and evolutions while using Kerrigan directly in most missions.

In StarCraft II: Legacy of the Void, the Zerg participate under Kerrigan's leadership in the wider conflict against Amon alongside the Terran and Protoss factions, concluding the main StarCraft II trilogy. The Zerg also appear in StarCraft II: Nova Covert Ops, a post-Legacy of the Void mission pack centered on Nova Terra. Early previews framed the campaign around uncertainty over whether the Zerg were moving to capture Terran worlds. It is later revealed that the Defenders of Man faction used psi-emitter devices to draw Zerg attacks against civilian worlds in order to undermine Emperor Valerian Mengsk, and that Nova had been manipulated into helping incite those attacks.

== Reception ==
=== Cultural impact ===
The Zerg have had a broader cultural impact through the terms "Zerg rush" and "zerging". Dictionary.com states that the term originated with StarCraft and refers to a strategy in which Zerg players rapidly produce numerous low-cost units, usually before an opponent has established adequate defenses. The related verb "zerging" is used more broadly in gaming communities to describe overwhelming an opponent through numbers, and Dictionary.com notes that it has also been used in some multiplayer games to refer to players gaining advantage through multiple accounts.

The phrase also received mainstream attention through Google's 2012 "Zerg rush" Easter egg. Typing "zerg rush" into Google on April 27, 2012 would cause animated letter "O"s from the Google logo to attack and destroy the search results, while users could click the attackers to fight back. ABC News described the feature as a StarCraft meme and reported that the animation ended with "GG", gamer shorthand for "good game". GamesBeat similarly described the Easter egg as a StarCraft-inspired reference to the Zerg tactic of creating many Zerglings and attacking before an opponent can build defenses.

The Zerg have also been used outside the series as the subject of advocacy and satire. At the 2013 launch of Heart of the Swarm, People for the Ethical Treatment of Animals (PETA) distributed pamphlets under the slogan "Zerglings Have Feelings, Too" at a launch event in Irvine, California. The campaign encouraged players to regard the Zerg sympathetically rather than simply as enemies, with PETA arguing that they were mistreated because the Terrans were unwilling or unable to understand them. PETA marketing director Joel Bartlett said that members of the organization were themselves StarCraft players and had developed empathy for the Zerg.

=== Critical reception ===
While contemporary reviews of the 1998 StarCraft video game praised Blizzard's work in making the game's three playable races mechanically and aesthetically distinct while keeping them competitively balanced, the Zerg are often singled out for discussion. In its review of StarCraft, GameSpot said the game avoided the genre problem of opposing sides playing the same way, describing the Terrans, Protoss, and Zerg as having distinct units, construction systems, interface art, and personalities. The review specifically characterized the Zerg as frightening, insect-like creatures able to burrow underground, and praised Blizzard for keeping the races balanced despite their differences. PC Gamer UK described the Zerg as "the best race in strategy history", reflecting the faction's strong reputation among strategy-game commentators.

The Zerg's specific gameplay identity has also been singled out in reviews of StarCraft II: Heart of the Swarm. PC Gamer described the Zerg as the "swarmy stars" of the expansion and said that the campaign quickly gives players control of screen-filling masses of units, making the faction's numberless fictional identity felt through play. CGMagazine similarly wrote that the Zerg's mechanics made the campaign move faster than Wings of Liberty, describing them as a race built around speed, rapid spawning, and constant action. Wired also praised the visual presentation of the Zerg in pre-release footage for StarCraft II, describing the updated Zerg designs as simultaneously beautiful and terrifying.

On the other hand, ongoing balance changes have led commentators to frame the Zerg as a difficult faction to tune in to in competitive StarCraft II. For example, Blizzard's 5.0.16 patch released on June 23, 2026 increased the Zerg larva periodic spawn rate from 10.7 to 9.5 seconds, which prompted MassivelyOP columnist Tyler F. M. Edwards to argue that the change illustrated the difficulty of balancing Zerg for ordinary professional play when exceptional players such as Serral can still make the race appear nearly unbeatable.

=== Analysis ===
Later scholarship on StarCraft has treated its race design as central to the game's historical role in real-time strategy and esports culture. In a 2019 Game Developer article on asymmetrical game design, Josh Bycer used the Zerg as an example of a faction whose individual units may be weaker than an opponent's, but whose ability to outnumber enemies can create a strategic advantage.

The Zerg have also been used in artificial intelligence research on StarCraft II, particularly in experiments using Zerg-versus-Zerg scenarios. The 2018 TStarBots paper presented agents tested in full 1v1 Zerg-versus-Zerg games on the Abyssal Reef map, reporting that both agents could defeat Blizzard's built-in AI from levels 1 to 10. Other reinforcement-learning work has similarly used Zerg-versus-Zerg matches to evaluate modular agents, while the later TStarBot-X study focused on Zerg play and used hundreds of thousands of Zerg-versus-Zerg replays for training.

Academic commentary has also examined the Zerg through their relationship to embodiment, monstrosity, and play style. A DiGRA analysis of implied play styles argues that the "insectness" of the Zerg in StarCraft II is not only a visual quality, but also shapes how players are encouraged to act, linking the race's fictional identity to its mechanics. Academic work on Kerrigan has also treated her Zerg-infested form as a site of monstrous transformation and hybrid identity. Gregory Blomquist argues that Kerrigan's Zerg transformation positions her across boundaries between human and nonhuman, Terran and Zerg, while Sarah Stang discusses Kerrigan as a rare example of a playable monstrous-feminine figure whose power is bound to her monstrous form.
