= NaDa =

South Korean entrepreneur, video game designer and gamer (born 1984)

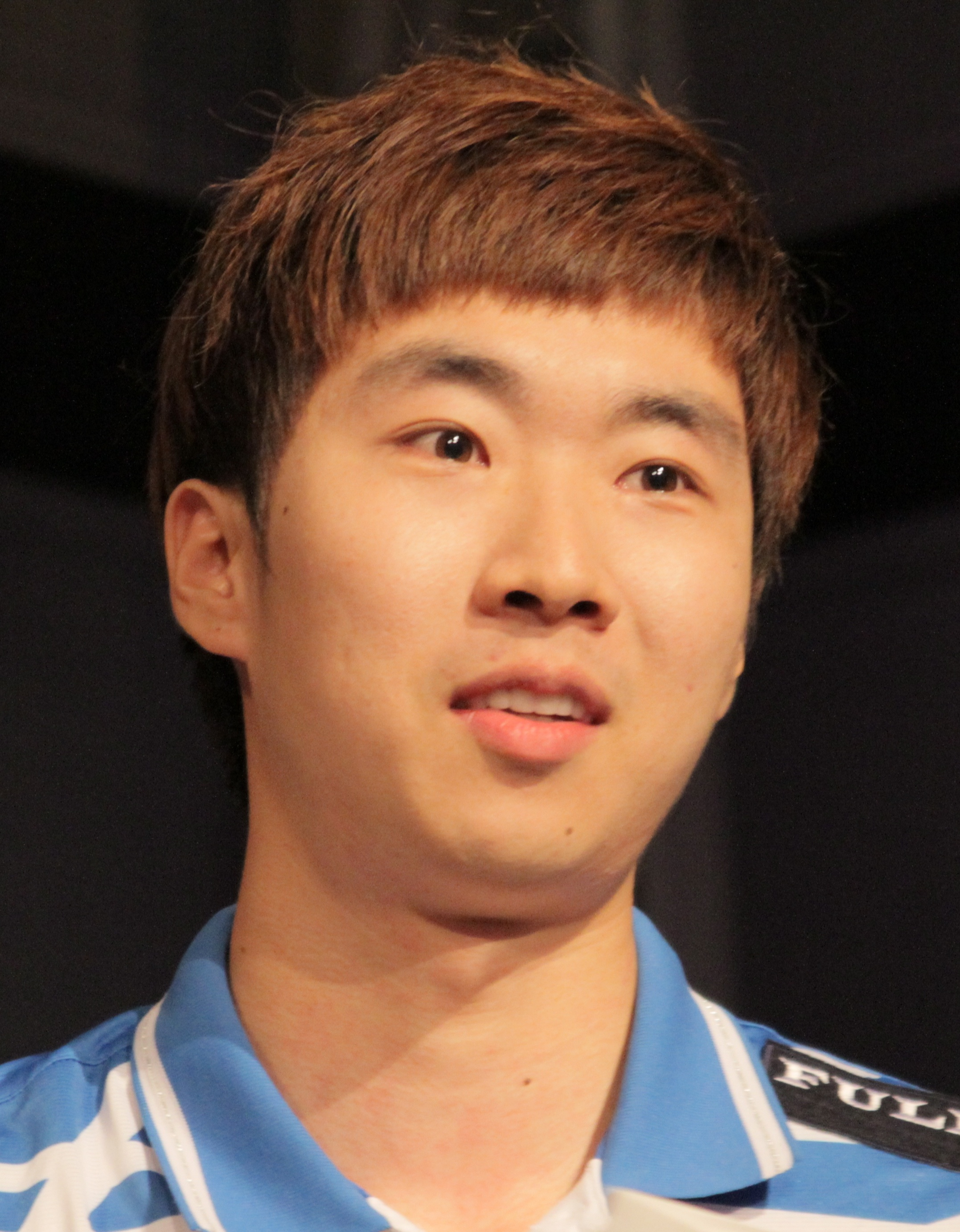
- Lee Yun-yeol wearing his oGs jersey.
- Born: Lee Yun-yeol
- Title: CEO of NaDa Digital

Esports career information
- Games: StarCraft: Brood War; StarCraft II
- Playing career: Until 2012
- Handle: NaDa
- Role: Terran

Team history
- 2001–2002: Ideal Space
- 2002–2003: KT_MagicNs
- 2003–2005: Toona S.G
- 2005–2007: Pantech EX
- 2007–2010: WeMade FOX
- 2010–2012: Old Generations
- 2011–2012: SK Gaming
- 2012: compLexity Gaming

Korean name
- Hangul: 이윤열
- Hanja: 李允烈
- RR: I Yunyeol
- MR: I Yunyŏl

Lee Yun-yeol (Korean: 이윤열, born 20 November 1984), better known as NaDa, is a South Korean entrepreneur, video game designer and former professional gamer who competitively played StarCraft: Brood War and StarCraft II. He is known for being one of the most accomplished Brood War players of all time with a total of six major title victories, including three KPGA tours in a row in 2002 and subsequently winning three OnGameNet StarLeagues over the following years, earning him the nickname, "Genius Terran". He achieved the highest KeSPA score of any player before it was re-scaled, and holds the record for longest stay in KeSPA's top 30 at 87 months, beginning in March 2002 and ending in May 2009. He has played for several top-ranking teams, including Pantech EX, Toona S.G., KT_MagicNs, Ideal Space and WeMade FOX. After his transition to StarCraft II in 2010, he joined the Korean team of Old Generations. In February 2012, he joined the American multi-gaming team, compLexity gaming.

On 19 June 2012, compLexity Gaming announced that Lee would be retiring from professional gaming, ending a career spanning over a decade.

== Career ==
=== Professional gaming ===
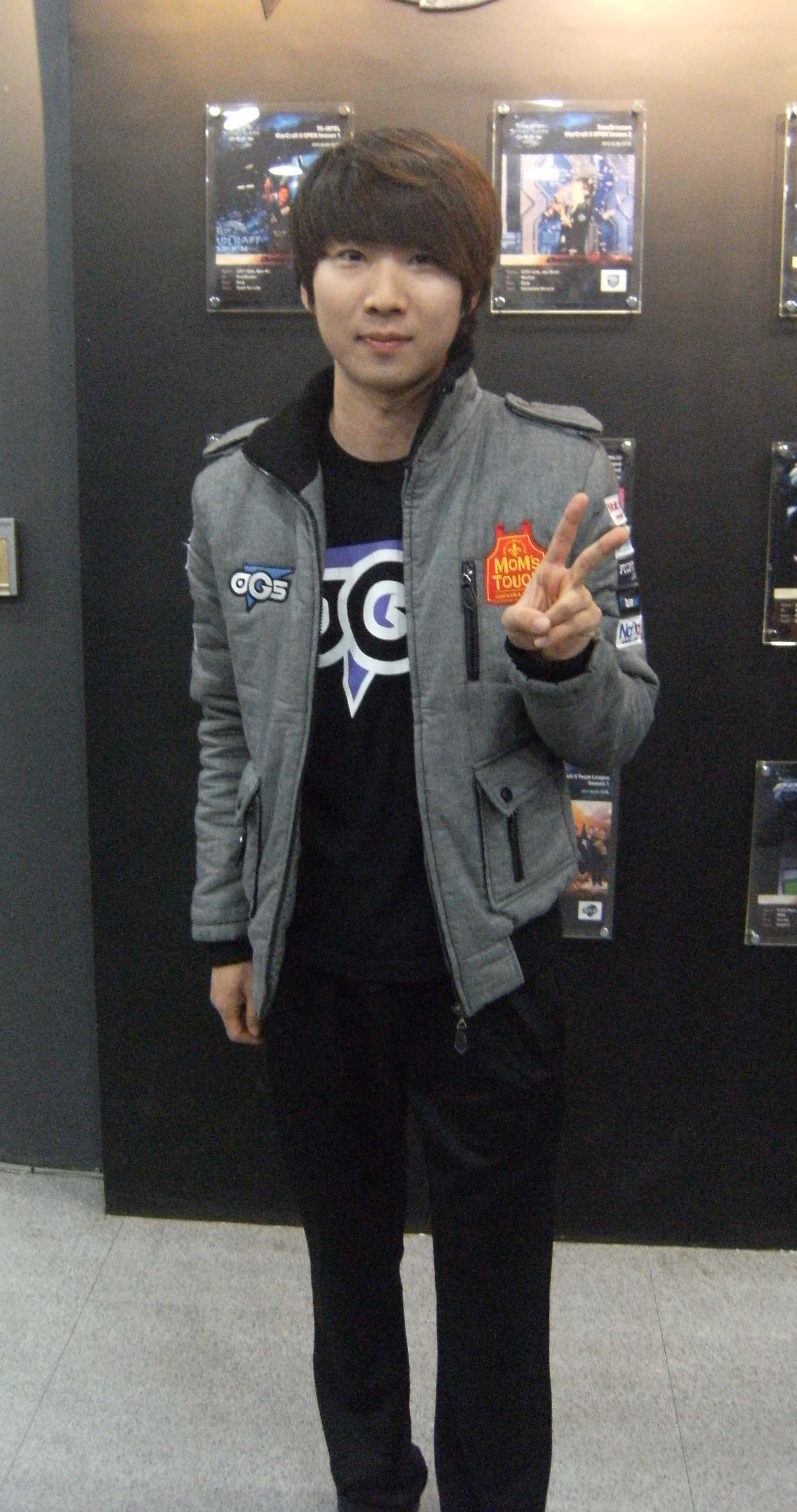
Yun-yeol in 2011

Lee first became known when he participated in an ITV game special where amateur players were pitted against professional players. Lee was the amateur and beat the player Chrh. Not long after, Lee made his debut as a pro gamer by winning three KPGA tours in three consecutive seasons all in a year's time. When the KPGA tour became the MBCGame StarCraft League, the KPGA tours were deemed equal to MSL wins, resulting in Lee being granted the golden badge, an award for winning three MSLs. Lee topped his KPGA Tour wins with a victory in the Panasonic OnGameNet Starleague. Afterwards Lee went into a slump; though he continued to be a strong player and came in second or first place in various leagues and tournaments, Lee did not win an MSL or OSL until the IOPS Ongamenet Starleague in 2004 or 2005. However, not long afterwards, Lee would enter the darkest period in his career. On 18 July 2005, FiFo reported that Lee's father had been killed in an automobile accident when an intoxicated driver performed an illegal U-turn and collided with his father's vehicle.

When Lee eventually returned to pro-gaming he began his return to the top. In December 2007, Lee was once again the number one-ranked pro gamer in the KeSPA rankings. It had been a full two years and five months since he had stopped performing in July 2004. Lee's comeback culminated in his victory in the 2006 2nd ShinHan Bank OnGameNet StarLeague. In his winner's interview, Lee dedicated his victory to his father, saying "Yes, it is my first time winning the finals with my mother seated as the audience. But, for this very victory, I give it all to my father, though he didn't make it. From now on, I will do my best for my mother." This victory not only marked a successful comeback performance, but also was Lee's third OSL win, him becoming the first player in history to earn the OSL's Golden Mouse trophy and was Lee's sixth major title win, making him the then most accomplished Brood War player in the game's history.

In 2007, Lee signed a three-year contract with WeMade FOX for approximately 690,000 USD. After his contract with the organization expired in 2010, Lee announced his intentions to fully switch to StarCraft II. Only after his retirement from Brood War was he equaled by Lee "Flash" Young-Ho for the most achievements in StarCraft: Broodwar. He joined the Korean team and gamer house of Old Generations and quickly became one of the strongest names in the StarCraft II scene, competing in the GOMTV Global StarCraft II League Season 2. There he advanced to the round of 8 before being defeated by Lim "BoxeR" Yo-Hwan. The following season Lee made it to round of 8 again, but was defeated by Lee "MarineKingPrime.WE" Jung-Hoon, losing 3 to 0. On 15 July 2011, SK Gaming announced a joint partnership with Old Generations, allowing for Lee and his teammate, Jang "MC" Min Chul, to be sponsored for international events on behalf of the organization. The partnership between Old Generations and SK Gaming ended on 13 January 2012, with Lee remaining with the former, while Jang remained with the latter until his contract expired at the end of January. On 16 February, Lee signed with American gaming team compLexity Gaming, wanting to participate in more StarCraft II events outside of Korea before leaving gaming to fulfill his mandatory South Korean Military service.

=== Business ventures ===
It was announced that on 20 November 2011, Lee would be fulfilling his dream of becoming a CEO by opening up his own e-store, the NaDa Mall, which sells pro-gaming equipment. In 2017, Lee began his professional game development career at NGEL Games, where he helped develop Project RTD: Random Tower Defense, a stand-alone adaptation of the popular StarCraft mod Random Tower Defense. Following the release of Project RTD in 2020, Lee founded his own studio called NaDa Digital, which released its first title, Mafia 3D, shortly after.

== Personal life ==
Lee was married on 9 November 2015, at the Legacy of the Void launch party held at COEX in Seoul. Fans were invited to purchase a Collector's Edition of the expansion pack and following the wedding ceremony showmatches were held to showcase the new expansion. The video was also live-streamed on Twitch and Afreeca.

== Tournament results ==
- 2001–2002 iTV Ranking 3rd League – winner
- 2001 Magic Station Network Gaming Tournament – winner
- 2002 1st GhemTV StarLeague – 3rd place
- 2002 iTV Ranking 4th League – winner
- 2002 Reebok KPGA Tour 2nd League – winner
- 2002 Pepsi Twist KPGA Tour 3rd League – winner
- 2002 Baskin Robbins KPGA Tour 4th League – winner
- 2002–2003 Panasonic OnGameNet Starleague – winner
- 2003 1st GhemTV StarLeague – winner
- 2004 You Are the Golf King MBCGame StarLeague – runner-up
- 2002–2003 KTEC KPGA Winners Championship – 3rd place
- 2003 KTF Bigi Four Kings Battle – runner-up
- 2003 GhemTV FindAll Challenger Open Starleague – runner-up
- 2003 Ting KBC Super Game Show Tournament – 3rd place
- 2003 Stout MBCGame Starleague – runner-up
- 2003 Hotbreak OnGameNet Masters – winner
- 2003 2nd TGSambo (TriGem) MBCGame Starleague – 3rd place
- 2004 KT-KTF Premiere League 통합 Championship – winner
- 2004 HanaFOS CEN Game MBCGame Starleague – runner-up
- 2004 KT-KTF Premier League – 3rd place
- 2004–2005 IOPS Ongamenet Starleague – winner
- 2005 Snickers All-Star League – runner-up
- 2006 2nd ShinHan Bank OnGameNet StarLeague – winner
- 2006–2007 3rd ShinHan Bank OnGameNet StarLeague – runner-up Fan
- 2007 Shinhan Bank OnGameNet Masters – winner
- 2009 e-Stars Seoul StarCraft Heritage League – runner-up
