= Races of StarCraft =

Fictional species in the StarCraft series

A Terran marine, Zerg hydralisk and Protoss zealot, representing the three playable races of the real-time strategy video games in the StarCraft franchise.

Blizzard Entertainment's military science fiction media franchise StarCraft revolves around interstellar affairs in the Koprulu Sector, a distant sector of the galaxy, with multiple species and multiple factions all vying for supremacy. The real-time strategy video game series is centered on three playable races: the Terrans, humans descended principally from exiles from Earth; the Zerg, a collective of assimilated alien species organized into a biological swarm; and the Protoss, a technologically advanced humanoid species with powerful psionic abilities. Each has distinct units, structures, technologies and methods of production, as well as its own societies and narrative campaigns. Other species important to the setting include the ancient Xel'Naga, whose actions are connected to the development of both the Protoss and Zerg, and Protoss–Zerg hybrids artificially created as part of the plans of the rogue Xel'Naga Amon.

The three playable races of StarCraft were first introduced in the 1998 title StarCraft and continued in its expansion StarCraft: Brood War and the StarCraft II trilogy. Their broad gameplay identities have remained consistent across the series: Terran forces emphasize flexibility and conventional military technology, Zerg forces rely on biological production and numbers, and Protoss armies consist primarily of technologically advanced and comparatively costly units. The races differ substantially in how they construct bases, produce armies and develop technology, while being designed to remain competitively balanced against one another.

== Concept and design ==
A Protoss warrior and a Zerg creature, as they appeared during StarCraft's pre-alpha production in 1996.

Development of StarCraft began after Blizzard Entertainment's Warcraft II: Tides of Darkness. Early versions retained much of the visual appearance and technology of Warcraft II, and a version shown publicly at E3 1996 was criticized for appearing too similar to Blizzard's fantasy series. The project subsequently underwent extensive technical and visual changes. Programmer Bob Fitch rewrote much of the engine, while the artwork was redesigned using three-dimensional models that were rendered into two-dimensional sprites.

The races also changed considerably during development. Early versions of the Zerg emphasized bright blue and purple colors and more heavily insectoid designs. Protoss concept art similarly changed from an earlier blue-and-green visual scheme, while Terran units were progressively developed into the industrial forms used in the released game. Blizzard sought to make the three sides identifiable both visually and mechanically. Artist Samwise Didier described Terran structures as predominantly square and mechanical, Protoss architecture as rounded and refined, and Zerg structures as organic and spiked. The Terrans were given a worn frontier appearance, the Protoss a more elaborate technological aesthetic, and the Zerg a biological appearance based around flesh, carapaces and other organic forms. Technical limitations also influenced the designs: units were given exaggerated proportions and silhouettes so that they could be distinguished at the small scale used during play.

The different appearances accompanied separate production systems and technology trees. Blizzard spent much of development balancing the three sides while retaining abilities such as Zerg burrowing, Protoss cloaking and distinctive methods of construction. Several units and mechanics continued to change late in development; the Terran Valkyrie, for example, appeared during development, was removed before release, and returned in Brood War.

When developing StarCraft II, Blizzard also sought to preserve elements that players strongly associated with each race while replacing or redesigning others. Art director Samwise Didier said the team identified the units they considered most recognizable by polling developers: among the Zerg these included the zergling, hydralisk, ultralisk and mutalisk, while the Terran selections included the marine, siege tank and battlecruiser. Retaining such familiar units gave the designers greater freedom to introduce new ones elsewhere in the technology trees, including units such as the Protoss colossus.

== Terrans ==
The Terrans are human beings who inhabit the Koprulu sector. Most descend from people exiled from Earth during a colonization project centuries before the events of the games. The colony ships became separated from their intended destination and established settlements across several worlds, eventually developing independent governments and societies.

=== Society and factions ===
Terran society is more politically fragmented than that of the other playable races. At the beginning of StarCraft, the principal power in the Koprulu sector is the Terran Confederacy, an authoritarian government centered on Tarsonis. Its opponents include the Kel-Morian Combine, the Umojan Protectorate, and the revolutionary Sons of Korhal led by Arcturus Mengsk. Mengsk launched an uprising which ultimately destroys the confederacy and replaces it with the Terran Dominion. The Dominion becomes the major Terran state through much of the series. Mengsk establishes himself as emperor after the fall of the Confederacy, while former Confederate Marshal Jim Raynor and his raiders become one of the principal rebel groups opposing his government. StarCraft II follows the conflict between Raynor and the Dominion and later depicts Arcturus's son Valerian assuming control of the regime after his father's death.

Earth develops separately from the Koprulu colonies. By the events of Brood War, it is governed by the United Earth Directorate (UED), which dispatches an expeditionary fleet after learning of the Protoss and Zerg. The UED temporarily defeats the Dominion and gains control over a developing Zerg Overmind before being defeated by an alliance of forces in the sector.

Terran factions differ politically and visually, but generally share a common technological base. Their internal conflicts remain an important part of the series alongside the larger war with the Protoss and Zerg.

=== Depiction and gameplay ===
Fan art illustrating powered infantry armor worn by Terran Marines.

Terran technology is based on recognizable military science fiction, including powered infantry armor, ballistic weapons, armored vehicles, aircraft and large battlecruisers. Their machinery is generally portrayed as functional and industrial rather than as technologically refined as Protoss equipment. Some humans use cybernetic augmentation, while individuals with strong psionic abilities are recruited and trained as covert operatives known as ghosts.

Terran forces combine infantry with mechanical and aerial units and are designed around flexibility. Their basic worker, the space construction vehicle, remains at a building site until construction is complete and can later repair structures and mechanical units. Biological units can be healed by specialized medical units. Several major Terran buildings are capable of lifting off and relocating, allowing bases to be rearranged or moved to new positions.

Terran armies include inexpensive infantry as well as increasingly specialized vehicles and aircraft. Their ability to repair equipment, relocate buildings and combine different unit types gives them a comparatively adaptable production and defensive system.

== Zerg ==
The Zerg are a collective of numerous alien species incorporated into a single biological swarm. Rather than manufacturing conventional technology, the Zerg alter and breed organisms to perform specialized functions. Their units, structures and spacecraft are living creatures created through controlled mutation and assimilation.

=== Biology and organization ===
The Zerg originated on Zerus, where native organisms possessed the ability to take genetic material from other lifeforms and use it to acquire new adaptations. The Xel'Naga intervened in their development and created the Overmind as a central intelligence capable of directing the species. Under the Overmind, the Zerg pursued what it regarded as genetic perfection by assimilating useful characteristics from other organisms.

Most Zerg strains are specialized descendants of species absorbed into the swarm. A creature may be altered so extensively that it bears little resemblance to its original form. Individual strains are adapted for roles such as gathering resources, aerial transport, assault, reconnaissance and command.

Under the Overmind, the Swarm was organized hierarchically. The Overmind directed Cerebrates, which in turn controlled individual broods, while Overlords and other organisms relayed control over lesser Zerg. The destruction of the Overmind disrupted this system. During Brood War, the surviving Cerebrates attempt to establish a replacement Overmind, while Sarah Kerrigan ultimately defeats them and brings most of the Swarm under her own control. In StarCraft II, Broodmothers serve as senior commanders beneath Kerrigan.

Heart of the Swarm introduces the Primal Zerg, descendants of Zerg that remained on Zerus and were never incorporated into the Overmind's Zerg Swarm. They retain the ability to acquire useful biological traits by consuming the essence of other organisms but lack the same collective command structure. Kerrigan returns to Zerus during the game and adopts aspects of their biology while rebuilding her Swarm.

=== Depiction and gameplay ===
The Zerg use an entirely organic visual language. Their units draw heavily on arthropod, reptilian and other animal forms, while their buildings resemble organs or large living organisms. Most Zerg structures must be grown on creep, a layer of living biomass that spreads around their colonies.

Zerg production is centered on hatcheries and their later evolutionary forms. Hatcheries generate larvae that can develop into different unit types once the required biological structures are available. The worker unit, the drone, transforms itself into most Zerg buildings rather than constructing them externally. Units and structures slowly regenerate lost health without requiring dedicated repairs.

The ability to produce multiple units from a common pool of larvae allows a Zerg player to alter the composition of an army relatively quickly. Many basic Zerg units are inexpensive and can be fielded in large numbers, while more advanced strains provide specialized aerial, siege and support capabilities. This emphasis on numerical attacks contributed to the later use of "Zerg rush" and "zerging" as terms outside the series.

== Protoss ==
The Protoss are a humanoid species originating on the jungle world Aiur. They possess strong natural psionic abilities and technology designed in part to complement those abilities. Their history and religion are closely connected with the Xel'Naga, who encountered the early Protoss while attempting to cultivate advanced forms of life.

=== Society and factions ===
Early Protoss society consisted of numerous tribes whose rivalries eventually developed into prolonged sectarian conflict. The mystic Khas discovered the psionic bond shared by the species and formulated the teachings known as the Khala. Most Protoss accepted the Khala and reorganized themselves into a caste-based civilization. The Judicator caste governed through the Conclave, the Templar served as its warrior caste, and the Khalai comprised the artisans, workers and other members of society. Tribal identities nevertheless continued within the wider Protoss civilization.

A minority of Protoss rejected the Khala because they feared the loss of individual identity within the communal psionic link. These Protoss severed their neural connection and were exiled from Aiur, eventually becoming known as the Nerazim. Their warriors are commonly called Dark Templar. After a period of migration, the Nerazim established themselves on Shakuras, where they encountered Xel'Naga ruins and developed a culture distinct from that of the Aiur Protoss. Although the two societies remained separated for generations, the Zerg invasion of Aiur forced its survivors to seek refuge on Shakuras, beginning their eventual reconciliation.

Adun was a Protoss warrior and strategist who led the Templar during the period before the exile of the Nerazim. Revered as a hero by the Protoss, Adun's legacy influenced Protoss culture, language, and military traditions. His name became associated with several important Protoss institutions and locations, including the Citadel of Adun and the Spear of Adun. The Zerg, after gaining knowledge of Protoss history and culture, referred to their enemies as the "Children of Adun".

StarCraft II further expands upon the diversity of Protoss civilization. The Tal'darim are a militaristic Protoss faction historically devoted to the rogue Xel'Naga Amon and governed through the chain of ascension, a hierarchy in which individuals advance by defeating those above them. During Legacy of the Void, Alarak supplants the Tal'darim highlord Ma'lash and turns much of the faction against Amon. The Purifiers are synthetic beings created by the Protoss, incorporating artificial personalities and preserved memories modeled on living Protoss warriors. They had been constructed as weapons but rebelled after being denied treatment as equals and were subsequently deactivated. Artanis reactivates the Purifiers during Legacy of the Void, and they later join his forces. The coalition assembled by Artanis from the surviving Aiur Protoss, Nerazim, Purifiers and those Tal'darim who choose to remain with them is known as the Daelaam.

The different Protoss traditions are incorporated directly into the Legacy of the Void campaign. Many army roles can be filled by units belonging to different Protoss groups, allowing the player to combine military traditions originating with the Aiur Protoss, Nerazim, Purifiers and Tal'darim.

=== Depiction and gameplay ===
Protoss are depicted as tall, physically powerful humanoids with digitigrade legs, luminous eyes and long neural cords extending from the backs of their heads. The neural cords are associated with the psionic connection through which most Protoss historically participated in the Khala. Different Protoss societies use related but visually distinct technologies. Traditional Aiur forces generally use gold armor and blue energy, Nerazim technology commonly incorporates darker metallic forms and green "void" energy, Tal'darim equipment uses darker armor with red energy, and Purifier units use predominantly mechanical forms with orange energy effects.

Protoss military technology includes warriors equipped with psionic weapons, robotic constructs and large spacecraft. Most units and buildings possess rechargeable energy shields in addition to their underlying durability. Their basic worker, the probe, does not remain at a construction site: it opens a warp rift through which a structure is brought into position and can immediately leave to perform another task. Most buildings require power supplied by a network of pylons.

Protoss units generally require greater investments of resources than equivalent forces fielded by the other races, but individual units tend to be durable and possess comparatively powerful abilities. Their production system consequently favors smaller numbers of expensive units supported by specialized technology and psionic abilities.

== Other ==
The Protoss and Zerg share a wider fictional history through the Xel'Naga, an ancient species that cultivated life throughout the StarCraft universe. The activities of the rogue Xel'Naga Amon and his servants eventually lead to the creation of genetically engineered hybrid beings combining Protoss and Zerg characteristics. Across its games, novels, short stories and other media, the wider StarCraft franchise has introduced a number of minor alien species and civilizations, most of which appear only briefly in the setting's broader lore.

=== Xel'Naga ===
The Xel'Naga are described in the original StarCraft material as ancient travelers whose name means "Wanderers from Afar". Xel'Naga ruins and artifacts recur throughout the series before living members of the species appear directly. A temple on Shakuras becomes central to the Protoss campaign in Brood War, while StarCraft II introduces further Xel'Naga sites and the Keystone, an artifact used at different points against Kerrigan and Amon.

Within series lore, the Xel'Naga visited numerous worlds while searching for species that exhibited qualities they called "purity of form" and "purity of essence". The Protoss attracted their attention because of their psionic potential and were associated with purity of form, while the Zerg were later associated with purity of essence because of their capacity for biological adaptation. Legacy of the Void expands this history into the Infinite Cycle. The Xel'Naga do not reproduce conventionally; instead, successive generations arise through the eventual union of beings possessing purity of form and purity of essence. Their activities therefore consist in nurturing life and allowing suitable species to develop until the cycle can continue. Amon rejects the cycle and attempts to reshape life according to his own design. His interference predates the events of the games and affects both the Protoss and Zerg. He manipulates the Zerg through the Overmind and later exploits the Protoss khala to control much of the population of Aiur. Other Xel'Naga oppose him, including Ouros, who remains hidden until the concluding events of Legacy of the Void.

Amon's forces also include creatures and manifestations originating from the Void, an otherworldly realm separate from the material universe. During Legacy of the Void, he and his servants deploy void thrashers, massive creatures summoned through rifts to attack enemy positions, as well as shadows of the Void, beings formed from Void energy that assume forms resembling Terran, Protoss and Zerg forces. These entities appear alongside forces placed under Amon's control during the conflict on Shakuras, Aiur and the subsequent expedition into the Void.

=== Protoss–Zerg hybrids ===
The Protoss-Zerg hybrids are artificially created organisms combining elements of Protoss and Zerg characteristics. Their existence is first revealed in the secret Brood War mission "Dark Origin", where Zeratul discovers a laboratory containing a developing hybrid overseen by Samir Duran, who was known to him as an associate of Kerrigan. Duran tells him that the creature represents the culmination of an undertaking much larger than Kerrigan or the contemporary conflict and indicates that similar experiments exist elsewhere.

The hybrids become a recurring threat in StarCraft II, appearing as high-level enemy units in multiple levels of the StarCraft II single-payer campaigns, rather than functioning as an ordinary fourth playable side. Different forms possess Zerg-derived physical characteristics alongside powerful psionic abilities associated with the Protoss. During Wings of Liberty, Zeratul experiences a possible future in which hybrid forces command the Zerg and systematically destroy the other civilizations. Raynor's forces also discover Terran-operated facilities conducting hybrid experiments. During Heart of the Swarm, Kerrigan and Alexei Stukov attack the hybrid laboratories at Skygeirr Station and confront its overseer Emil Narud while destroying the creatures being produced there. Legacy of the Void establishes Narud as a shapeshifting Xel'Naga servant of Amon who had previously appeared as Samir Duran, and reveals the purpose of the hybrids as part of Amon's attempt to break the Infinite Cycle.

=== Kalathi ===
The Kalathi are a sapient species encountered by the Protoss during an earlier period of expansion, far outside the Koprulu sector. Protoss attempts to interfere in an internal conflict among the Kalathi escalated into the Kalath Intercession, during which Protoss colossi were deployed against them. The destruction caused by the conflict appalled the Protoss and became associated with later restrictions on the use of the colossi and on direct interference with less technologically advanced species. The surviving Kalathi were reduced to a substantially less technologically developed state. Because their homeworld lies far beyond the Koprulu sector, the Terrans are not aware of them during the events of the games.

=== Gargantis proximae ===
The Gargantis proximae were a semi-sapient, spacefaring species that became incorporated into the Zerg Swarm prior to the events of the games. Their heightened senses and psionic capabilities were retained during assimilation, and they became the biological basis of the Zerg Overlord strain, which is used to relay orders and coordinate other members of the Swarm. The short story "Just an Overlord" expands upon their existence before assimilation, describing the Gargantis proximae as communal herbivores capable of psionic communication and emotional expression. They also communicated through changes in color and manipulation of their tentacles, could live for centuries, and displayed mourning behavior when members of their species died.

== Gameplay and balance ==
The Terrans, Zerg and Protoss use the same two principal resources, minerals and vespene gas, but differ in the systems through which those resources are converted into units, structures and technological development. Terran workers physically construct buildings and can repair mechanical units and structures; Protoss probes initiate the warping-in of buildings, most of which require power supplied by pylons; and Zerg drones transform into biological structures, while most Zerg combat units develop from larvae produced by hatcheries. Population limits are likewise maintained differently: Terrans construct supply depots, Protoss warp in pylons, and the Zerg breed mobile Overlords to exert and maintain control over its numbers.

The races also differ in how damaged forces recover. Terran mechanical units and buildings can be repaired by workers, Protoss units and structures possess shields that recharge over time, and Zerg organisms gradually regenerate health. Their military forces follow different production and technological structures, so units occupying broadly similar battlefield roles do not necessarily share the same costs, abilities or tactical uses.

Competitive play consequently distinguishes six principal non-mirror and mirror match-ups: Terran versus Protoss, Terran versus Zerg, Protoss versus Zerg, Terran versus Terran, Protoss versus Protoss and Zerg versus Zerg. Because each race has different production systems, units and technological options, strategies and timing vary according to the opposing race.

Maintaining these differences while balancing the three races was a major concern during development. Blizzard developers later described the addition of three substantially asymmetric sides as increasing the difficulty of balancing the game, with units and abilities repeatedly adjusted while the races retained their separate production methods and tactical identities.

== Reception and legacy ==
=== Critical reception ===
The distinction between the three playable races was one of the most frequently praised elements of the original StarCraft. Ron Dulin of GameSpot wrote that the races had different units, construction systems and interfaces and that playing each provided a distinct experience. He considered it particularly notable that Blizzard maintained balance despite those differences. Tom Chick of IGN similarly praised both the differences and balance between the races, calling Blizzard's approach to them unusually ambitious for the genre. He also noted that units retained useful roles after more advanced technology became available rather than following a simple progression in which early units became obsolete. Contemporary criticism was not uniformly positive; Computer and Video Games considered the game highly playable but found some similarity remained between the three sides.

The differentiation remained part of later assessments of the series. Reviewing StarCraft II for Wired, John Meyer identified the inclusion of three separate playable races and their balance as an important part of the original game's reputation. A retrospective feature published by Game Developer in 2018 identified the three asymmetric races as one of StarCraft's major contributions to real-time strategy design. Developers interviewed for the article contrasted the game with earlier strategy titles in which opposing factions shared most of their underlying mechanics. Jeremy Ables recalled being struck by how differently the three sides played, while Jesús Arribas highlighted the combination of separate aesthetics, play styles, stories and personalities. Former Blizzard developers described balancing the three races as a major challenge during development.

=== Themes and analysis ===
The relationship between the races' fictional identities and their mechanics has received academic analysis. Mark Butler examined the three species in the chapter "Protoss-, Zerg- und Terraner-Werden", treating the selection of a race as a different form of engagement with the game's strategic systems. He characterizes Zerg play in terms of biological production and expansion, Terran play in terms of territorial flexibility, and Protoss play in terms of the high economic investment associated with their technology. Butler argues that the differences extend across construction, movement, development, attack and defense rather than being limited to unit appearance.

Simon Dor discusses the three races extensively in the 2024 publication StarCraft: Legacy of the Real-Time Strategy. He describes the game's balance as asymmetric because Terrans, Zerg and Protoss possess different units, buildings, technologies and abilities without direct equivalents across the races. Rather than eliminating those differences, balance emerges from the relationship between their capabilities and the strategies players develop in response to them. Dor also connects visual differentiation with strategic interpretation. Players must identify enemy units and technologies quickly enough to anticipate what an opponent may do next, making the recognizable appearance of the races and their technology trees relevant to competitive decision-making.

Tristan Abbey, writing in The New Atlantis, describes the races as three civilizations with separate strengths, weaknesses and strategic tendencies. He uses their "balanced asymmetry" as an analogy for strategic competition between societies that do not possess identical military systems, contrasting StarCraft with games such as chess in which opponents begin with equivalent pieces.

A separate quantitative study by Joshua Lewis, Patrick Trinh and David Kirsh examined more than 2,000 expert StarCraft: Brood War games. The researchers analyzed player actions and strategy across games involving different race match-ups, using the corpus to investigate patterns in expert real-time strategy play.

Outside academic writing, Antony Terence of SuperJump interpreted Protoss society through themes of caste, conformity and inherited social structures, drawing parallels between the Khalai caste system and aspects of the Indian caste system. He compared the Protoss judicator, templar and Khalai castes with historically differentiated social roles in India, and viewed the divisions between the Khalai, Nerazim and Tal'darim as part of the series' treatment of conformity and exclusion. Terence also interpreted the severing of the Khala in Legacy of the Void as a conflict between collective identity and individuality, in which the Protoss are forced to abandon an institution that had unified their society for generations.

=== Influence and cultural impact ===
The three-race system became a recurring example in discussions of asymmetric game design. Jon Shafer, lead designer of Civilization V, argued that the Zerg's identity resulted from the combination of their visual presentation and mechanics, stating that simply giving Terran-like units Zerg artwork would not reproduce the experience of playing the race. He used StarCraft to illustrate both the benefits of strongly differentiated factions and the increased difficulty of balancing them.

The 2018 Game Developer retrospective similarly described the game's balanced factions as influential on subsequent strategy-game design. Developers cited the contrast between the Terrans' conventional military technology, Protoss advanced weaponry and Zerg swarms as an example of races retaining different identities without ceasing to function competitively against one another.

The Zerg acquired a particularly visible cultural legacy. "Zerg rush" and "zerging" came to be used more broadly in gaming for strategies based on rapidly overwhelming an opponent with large numbers of inexpensive attackers. The expression later spread beyond direct discussion of StarCraft. In 2012, Google released a "Zerg rush" search-page Easter egg in which attacking letter "O"s progressively destroyed search results.

The races of StarCraft have also been used outside conventional game criticism. In 2013, astronomers Thomas Targett and Duncan Forgan used data from professional StarCraft II matches in a science-communication exercise modelling which of the game's civilizations might be most successful at galactic expansion. Wired reported on the project and the different strategic tendencies assigned to Terran, Protoss and Zerg play.
