= StarCraft: Brood War =

Expansion pack for StarCraft

- The box art displays Kerrigan, one of the main characters in the series.
- Developers: Saffire; Blizzard Entertainment
- Publisher: Blizzard Entertainment
- Producer: Shane Dabiri
- Designer: Rob Pardo
- Artists: Samwise Didier; Duane Stinnett
- Writer: Chris Metzen
- Composers: Tracy W. Bush; Jason Hayes; Glenn Stafford
- Series: StarCraft
- Platforms: Microsoft Windows, Mac OS, Nintendo 64
- Release: Microsoft Windows: NA: December 18, 1998; PAL: March 1999; Mac OS: NA: June 30, 1999
- Genre: Real-time strategy
- Modes: Single-player, multiplayer

StarCraft: Brood War is the expansion pack for the military science fiction real-time strategy video game StarCraft. Released in December 1998 for Microsoft Windows and June 1999 for Mac OS, it was co-developed by Saffire and Blizzard Entertainment. The expansion pack introduces new campaigns, map tilesets, music, extra units for each race, and upgrade advancements. The campaigns continue the story from where the original StarCraft ended, with the sequel, StarCraft II: Wings of Liberty, continuing from the conclusion of Brood War. The expansion was released first in the United States on December 18, 1998.

Brood War was critically well received, with reviewers praising it for being developed with the care of a full game rather than as an uninspired extra. As of May 31, 2007, StarCraft and Brood War have sold almost ten million copies combined. The game is especially popular in South Korea, where professional players and teams have participated in matches, earned sponsorships, and competed in televised matches.

As of April 19, 2017, StarCraft and its Brood War expansion, aka the Anthology, are free to download and play from Blizzard's website. A remastered edition of StarCraft and its expansion was released on August 14, 2017.

== Gameplay ==
Several new units were added for Brood War, such as these UED Valkyrie-class frigates.

StarCraft focuses around three distinct interstellar species: the psionic Protoss, the adaptable Terrans, and the insectoid Zerg. The game revolves around players collecting resources to construct a base, upgrade their militaries, and ultimately conquer opponents. Brood War's gameplay remains fundamentally unchanged from that of StarCraft, although it made small alterations to unit costs and some abilities, and added some new units. These changes make rushing tactics—a factor that gained some criticism in the original StarCraft—less practical. The single-player campaign has an increased difficulty; missions are no longer entirely linear, and a greater focus on strategy is needed to complete missions. In addition, the game's artificial intelligence (AI) has been augmented so that AI-controlled players are more intelligent and tend to use tactics more effectively.

Brood War introduces seven new units. Each race is given access to a unique ground unit: the Zerg can create a defensive unit that can attack from the concealment of its burrow, while the Terrans can train combat medics. The Protoss are able to produce dark templar units, a powerful cloaked melee unit only given to the player in special missions of StarCraft. Protoss players can merge two of these units to create a special spellcaster unit. Each race is also given access to a dedicated air-to-air attack unit.

== Synopsis ==
=== Setting ===
Brood War takes place in the StarCraft universe, set around the early 26th century. Terran exiles from Earth have colonized a distant area of the Milky Way galaxy called the Koprulu Sector, having established several governments. Eventually, a civil war breaks out and ends with the formation of the Terran Dominion. However, humanity soon becomes caught in a war between the Protoss and the Zerg, which culminates at the end of StarCraft with the death of the Zerg leader, the Overmind, on the Protoss homeworld of Aiur. Without the Overmind to command, the Zerg rampage mindlessly across Aiur, while the cerebrates—the secondary commanders of the Swarm—attempt to regain control. After the discovery of alien life in the Koprulu Sector, the United Earth Directorate (UED)—the international body governing Earth—decides to send an expeditionary force to secure the sector and prevent the aliens from finding Earth. Brood War begins two days after the conclusion of StarCraft.

=== Characters ===
The player assumes the roles of three anonymous characters over the course of the game. In the first campaign, the player assumes the role of a Protoss fleet commander. The player's character is commanded by Zeratul and Aldaris, two adversaries from StarCraft who have since reconciled their differences to lead their people in the face of the rampaging Zerg. They are joined by Jim Raynor, a Terran rebel on the run from the Dominion, Artanis, the previous Executor of the third campaign of StarCraft who has recently been promoted, and Raszagal, the matriarch of the dissident dark templar faction in Protoss society. The second campaign sees the player as a captain in the UED expeditionary force, reporting to the fleet's admiral Gerard DuGalle and his vice-admiral Alexei Stukov. To secure the sector, the UED plans to overthrow the Terran Dominion and its emperor Arcturus Mengsk, and are assisted in this by Samir Duran, a mysterious psionic ghost espionage agent, and his group of anti-Dominion rebels. The final campaign has the player assume the position of a Zerg cerebrate, a commander within the Zerg Swarm. The player is put under the control of Sarah Kerrigan, a Terran who was infested by the Zerg in StarCraft.

=== Plot ===
The story of Brood War is presented through its instruction manual, the briefings to each mission, and conversations within the missions themselves, along with the use of cinematic cut scenes at the end of each campaign. The game itself is split into three new episodes, one centering on each race.

In the first episode, the player (as the Protoss Executor), Aldaris, Zeratul, and the newly promoted Praetor Artanis work to evacuate the surviving Protoss from their devastated homeworld through a warp gate to the dark templar homeworld, Shakuras, where they meet the matriarch of the dark templar, Raszagal. Although the Zerg are able to follow the Protoss to Shakuras, Raszagal informs the survivors of a Xel'Naga temple on the surface of the planet with the power to scour the Zerg from the surface if activated. With Zeratul and Artanis reluctantly partnering with Sarah Kerrigan, who informs them of a new Overmind growing on Char, the player joins them in an operation to recover two key crystals (Khalis and Uraj) necessary to operate the temple. Upon their return, it is revealed that Aldaris has begun an uprising against the dark templar over their alliance with Kerrigan. The uprising is crushed, and Aldaris is killed by Kerrigan, who reveals that her motives are to ensure the destruction of the Zerg cerebrates on Shakuras so she can gain control of the Zerg herself before departing the planet. Despite knowing that activating the temple will accomplish Kerrigan's objectives, Zeratul and Artanis proceed with little other choice, wiping the Zerg off Shakuras' surface.

In the second episode, the player (as a UED captain), leads the United Earth Directorate's initial incursions against the Terran Dominion. Upon meeting Samir Duran, the fleet's vice-admiral Alexei Stukov conscripts Duran as a special advisor. The UED soon discovers a "psi disrupter"—a device capable of disrupting Zerg communications—on the former Confederate capital Tarsonis. Although Duran persuades admiral Gerard DuGalle to have the anti-Zerg device destroyed, Stukov's forces relieve Duran at the last moment. The UED proceeds to the Dominion throne world Korhal IV where the player defeats Arcturus Mengsk's armies, although Mengsk is rescued when a Protoss fleet commanded by Jim Raynor arrives. The UED tracks Raynor and Mengsk to the Protoss homeworld of Aiur, but the two escape the massive UED assault when Duran inexplicably moves his forces out of position and allows the Zerg to interfere with the operation. Having understood that the UED invasion had caused Mengsk, Raynor, and the Protoss to band together against a common foe, Stukov realizes that Duran's actions and the Zerg attack were too much to be a coincidence—the Zerg were also allied with the Terran Dominion and the Protoss, and Duran had been working to undermine the UED. While Stukov takes a contingent of troops and reconstructs the psi disrupter on Braxis, DuGalle is unaware of his intentions and becomes convinced that he is a traitor. The player helps Duran hunt down Stukov inside the psi disrupter, but before he dies, Stukov reveals to DuGalle that Duran is the real enemy. Duran flees after the player foils his attempt to sabotage the psi disrupter. Using the psi disrupter's capabilities, DuGalle and the UED are able to assault the Zerg world Char and take control of the new Overmind growing there.

The final section of Brood War sees the player (as a lone Cerebrate) helping Sarah Kerrigan defeat the UED. With the Overmind falling under the United Earth Directorate's command, all operations amongst native factions in the sector are damaged, including Kerrigan's forces. To begin the campaign against the Directorate forces, Kerrigan and Samir Duran form a reluctant alliance with Jim Raynor, Protoss praetor Fenix, and Arcturus Mengsk to destroy the psi disrupter. After destroying the psi disrupter, the player leads Kerrigan's forces in a full-scale assault on Korhal, quickly breaking the UED's hold over the planet. In the aftermath, Kerrigan betrays her allies, destroying a large number of Dominion forces and killing both Fenix as well as Edmund Duke, Mengsk's right-hand man. Angry at Kerrigan's betrayal, Raynor promises that he will kill her one-day and retreats. Kerrigan travels with Duran to Shakuras and abducts Raszagal, who she uses to blackmail Zeratul into killing the Overmind on Char, thus bringing all Zerg forces under Kerrigan's control. Zeratul attempts to rescue Raszagal, but the player prevents their escape, and Zeratul eventually kills Raszagal when it becomes clear she has been irreversibly brainwashed by Kerrigan. At that moment it becomes clear that Aldaris's uprising in the first episode was an attempt to stop the brainwashed Raszagal from betraying her people any further. Upon leaving Char in search of Artanis, Zeratul stumbles upon a genetics facility run by Duran without Kerrigan's knowledge where a Protoss/Zerg hybrid is being developed. At the same time, Kerrigan is attacked on Char by the Dominion, the UED, and a vengeful fleet commanded by Artanis. Despite being outnumbered, Kerrigan defeats all three fleets and eradicates the surviving UED fleet, leaving her the dominant power in the sector. Before the UED fleet is wiped out, Admiral DuGalle sends a final message back to his family before committing suicide with his pistol.

== Development ==
Development on Brood War began shortly after the release of StarCraft in 1998 and was announced after the release of StarCraft's first two expansion packs, Insurrection and Retribution (both expansions were authorized by Blizzard but not developed by them). Most of the team at Blizzard responsible for StarCraft returned to work on Brood War. They were assisted by members of Saffire, who were contracted for a variety of tasks consisting of programming and design for levels, visuals, and audio effects. According to Shane Dabiri, the game's producer, Brood War aimed to drastically increase the significance of the story within gameplay, stating that the team was adding scripting that would allow "Final Fantasy type events" to be played out during the course of a level. Dabiri further explained that the objectives in the missions would also reflect the story in a far more interactive way, with players being presented with tactical decisions over which objectives to pursue and with fewer missions revolving around simple annihilation of the enemy. Although originally slated for release in the US in October 1998, Brood War's release was delayed by two months to come out in December.

In the summer of 1998, James Phinney and Jesse McReynolds, who had led development of StarCraft, resigned to start Fugitive Studios over frustration with management. Amid an accounting scandal at Blizzard's then-parent company, Cendant, this exodus caused the game's final months of development to occur under crunch culture. Fugitive Studios ultimately dissolved the following year, and its staff mostly rejoined Blizzard to support development of future StarCraft games.

As with StarCraft, an exemplar campaign showcasing the methods of creating a custom campaign for Brood War is available. Entitled Enslavers: Dark Vengeance, the campaign follows the actions of a rogue dark templar, Ulrezaj, and his attempts to remove the Khalai Protoss from his homeworld of Shakuras, with the player and Zeratul trying to stop him. However, it is not included in the release and must be downloaded separately from Battle.net.

== Cultural impact ==
Reception

Review scores
Publication	Score
Computer Gaming World	5/5
GameRevolution	B−
GameSpot	9.1/10
IGN	8/10
PC Zone	8.9/10
The Cincinnati Enquirer	3.4/4
Macworld	4.5/5

Awards
Publication	Award
Computer Gaming World	Add-on of the Year
GameSpot	Best Expansion Pack
GameSpot	Greatest Games of All Time

=== Critical reception ===
StarCraft: Brood War was critically acclaimed. The magazine PC Zone gave Brood War a short but flattering review, describing it as having "definitely been worth the wait". PC Zone praised the inclusion of new units and the balancing tweaks as transforming the original StarCraft "from an okay game into something akin to the mutt's nuts". The review also drew note to the cinematic cut scenes, stating that they "actually feel like part of the story rather than an afterthought".

IGN praised Brood War as a "carefully designed" expansion, "with a surfeit of new features that will satisfy even the pickiest of gamers". Although stating that there was "enough to enrich the core gameplay without losing the flavor", IGN presented concern over the difficulty of the game: "Brood War's difficulty is an order of magnitude higher than StarCraft. [Players will] barely have enough time to acquaint [themselves] with the new units before the enemy starts coming at [them] full bore." However, IGN praised the plot as "compelling" and described the extended multiplayer as "one of the best features" of the game, ultimately rating the expansion as "impressive".

GameSpot was also positive in its review, stating that the design of Brood War "contains all the care, detail, and ingenuity of a true sequel" that "completely revitalizes" the original game. The reviewer praises the "seemingly minor but terribly significant modifications" to the balance of the game, putting the results as "outstanding", but draws concern to the interface's shortfalls in coping with these changes. GameSpot also notes the music and audio work on Brood War as a bold improvement, describing the voice acting as "completely convincing" in a heavily story-driven single-player campaign that although becoming less innovative in the latter stages, "remains captivating to the end". The review concludes that Brood War is a "more-than-worthy successor to StarCraft and one of the finest computer game expansion sets of all time", and gave a special achievement award of "Best Expansion Pack" to the game.

In its review, The Cincinnati Enquirer commended Brood War's new content, praising the efforts gone to in the development of the expansion. Noting the increased difficulty of the expansion and its multiplayer success, The Cincinnati Enquirer stated that "While it's rare that an expansion pack reawakens the joy birthed from the original, Brood War proves it's not impossible" and concluding that the expansion was a "worthwhile choice".

However, the positive critical response to Brood War was not universal. Game Revolution described the gameplay as "identical to StarCraft in almost every way" and displaying mixed feelings towards the new units. The reviewer continued by stating that "while the unit upgrades are good, the scenarios still don't cut it", describing the single-player mission design as an "afterthought" despite the expansion possessing an "interesting" storyline. Dismissing the multiplayer additions as unimportant, Game Revolution summarized that while "a fun expansion", Brood War was "a mixed bag".

Brood War was a finalist for Computer Games Strategy Plus's 1998 "Add-On of the Year" award, which ultimately went to Age of Empires: The Rise of Rome. The editors noted that Brood War was "very popular, and added to the already considerable appeal of the original, award-winning, title."

=== Legacy ===
StarCraft, along with its expansion Brood War, rapidly grew in popularity in South Korea, establishing a successful professional gaming scene. Some pro-gamers have gained television contracts, sponsorships, and tournament prizes, allowing the most famous player, Lim Yo-Hwan, who is known in-game as SlayerS `BoxeR`, to gain a fanclub of over a half million people. Professional gamers dedicate many hours each day to playing StarCraft when preparing for the highly competitive leagues. Lee Yun-Yeol, a Terran player known as [Red]NaDa, reported earnings in 2005 of US$200,000. In April 2009, a Collegiate Star League was formed in the U.S. to facilitate inter-collegiate competition amongst university teams and clubs. In October 2009, the first live collegiate StarCraft match occurred between Rutgers University and Princeton University in a best-of-five series.

On May 2, 2012, KeSPA, Ongamenet, Blizzard Entertainment, and GomTV announced the introduction of StarCraft II: Wings of Liberty to professional competitions in South Korea with StarCraft: Brood War being completely phased out in October.

However, even after being supplanted by its successor, Brood War competition remained popular for part of an audience and streaming channels of retired professional gamers kept popularity. Outside governance of Korean eSports Professional Association, amateur competitions started to gain popularity.
