= IdrA =

American professional esports player

Idra
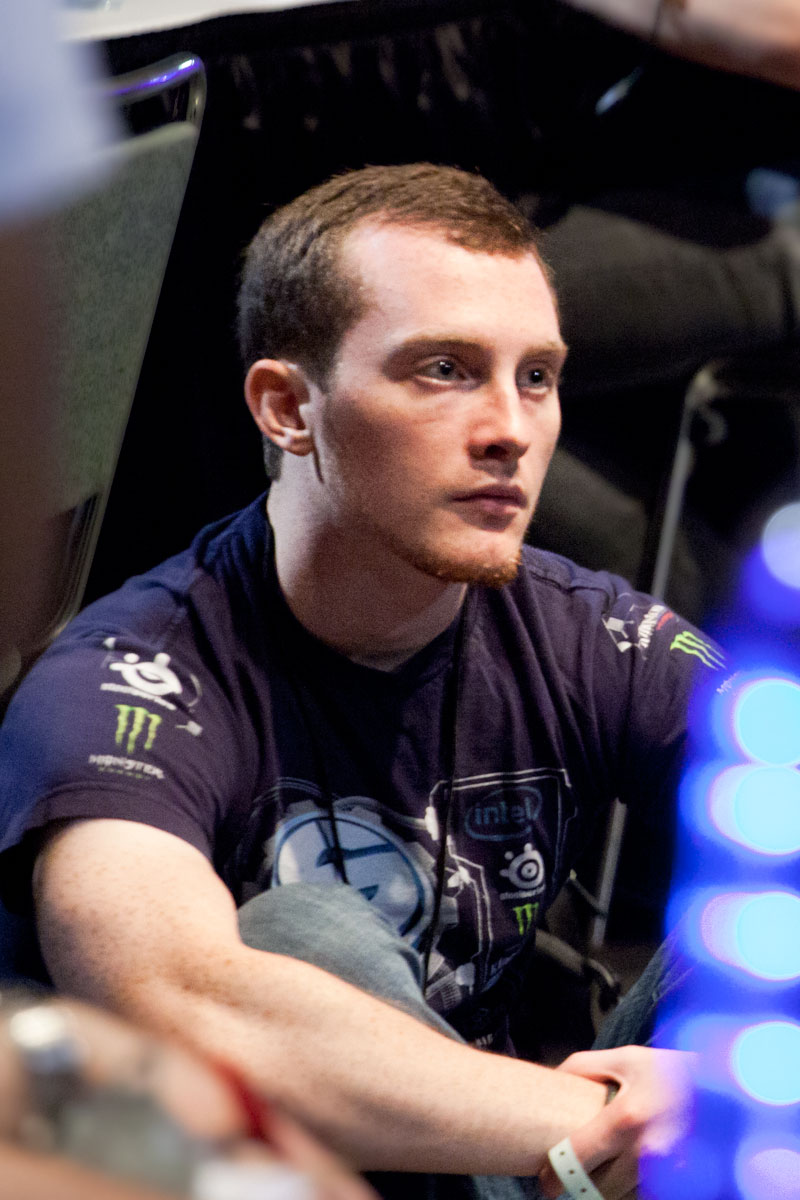
- IdrA at a Major League Gaming championship in 2011

Personal information
- Name: Greg Fields
- Born: 1989 (age 36–37)
- Nationality: American

Career information
- Games: StarCraft: Brood War; StarCraft II; Heroes of the Storm
- Playing career: 2007–2013 (StarCraft)

Gregory "Greg" Fields, better known by his in-game name IdrA (pronounced /ˈɪˌdrə/ I-druh) is a former professional StarCraft II and Brood War player who predominantly played as Terran in Brood War, but switched to Zerg for StarCraft II. After retiring to focus on school, he returned to former team Evil Geniuses for Heroes of the Storm.

In Starcraft II, IdrA was known for his focus on economy, production, and general army management, also known as macromanagement. This caused him to "hate" sub-optimal strategies that typically only work when the opponent does not expect them, also known as cheese.

The "IdrA Build" is so-called because IdrA rarely deviated from this build during the beta. Such pertinacity is exemplary of his play style, which has occasionally proven to be somewhat vulnerable to unconventional or unexpected enemy tactics.

Despite gathering respect from both fans and players alike for his abilities, IdrA has gained considerable notoriety for his displays of improper etiquette both during ladder and online tournament matches. His habit of trash talking, vocalizing perceived game imbalance and abandoning games in a fit of frustration, have made him a controversial player within the StarCraft scene.

He took his PhD in ECE in University of California from 2019 to 2025 where he co-authored seven publications. In Blizzcon 2026, he confirmed that he completed his thesis after Sue "Smix" Lee called him "Doctor Fields". He was also involved in physics research and co-authored a paper research on multiple aging mechanisms on 2019.

== Biography ==
Greg Fields was born in 1989 and is from Kalamazoo, Michigan. His alias - "IdrA" - was originally inspired by the Hindu mythological character "Indrajit". He chose to pursue a professional StarCraft career over attending Rensselaer Polytechnic Institute on scholarship to study theoretical physics.

IdrA lived in Korea for three years and achieved considerable success in Brood War's foreign scene, winning numerous international tournaments. Notable among these was the eSTRO SuperStars tournament in 2007 that opened doors for him in Korea. He initially moved into the CJ Entus dorm, then in with the commentator Nick "Tasteless" Plott and lastly in his own apartment.

When the Starcraft II beta was released in February 2010, IdrA officially switched over from Brood War and quickly imposed himself as one of the strongest players through various tournaments and ranking 1st in the Platinum League (Division 2) with a record of 62–8, an impressive run culminating with his victory in the Day 9's King of the Beta tournament.

== StarCraft II Player Career ==
=== Early SC2, Korea and Code S ===
Following his success in beta, IdrA was among the 10 invitees to the IEM Season V - Global Challenge Cologne, the first major live StarCraft II event in Europe. In that tournament, he beat all his opponents in the group stages and advanced to the finals, only to fall against the heavily aggressive style of play from MorroW, which featured heavy Reaper usage. IdrA would also leave Korea for MLG D.C. 2010 where he took 1st place, defeating players such as SeleCT, KiWiKaKi, and HuK.

In September 2010, departing from CJ Entus on good terms, IdrA began talks with most foreign organizations but ultimately it came down to choosing between Team Liquid or Evil Geniuses. He said that he felt EG was more established and had a better business plan and so joined the US-based organization Evil Geniuses. The offers that both teams made were very similar. However, he stayed in Korea and managed to qualify for the first three GOMTV Global Starcraft II Open Seasons, reaching the Round of 32, Round of 16, and round of 32 respectively. This allowed him to secure a code S spot for the first GOMTV Sponsorship League in January in which he would have his most successful run to date; IdrA managed to defeat Ensnare and Check in the group stage and made a surprising run, eliminating Clide, Genius and NaDa, going 3–0 in his group stage, but ultimately losing 1–3 against fellow foreigner Jinro in the Round of 8. At that point, and despite his significant success, IdrA seriously considered retiring, frustrated with the state of Zerg in StarCraft II (he and NesTea were the only Zerg players in the Top 16 at the time). IdrA subsequently relinquished his Code S status as EG would announce on February 16, his indefinite return to the United States at the beginning of March after playing in Korea for 3 years.

=== Back From Korea ===
Now turning his efforts into the steadily growing international scene, IdrA met decent results in spring 2011 with five important tournament event podiums in three months, convincingly winning the first season of the IGN ProLeague and the WCG USA 2011 Qualifier #1, but also placing 4th in MLG Columbus 2011, 2nd in the 2011 DreamHack Stockholm Invitational and 7th in the MLG Dallas 2011, in which IdrA played the infamous hallucination match with HuK : after substantial back and forth, he seemed to have taken a lead that would allow him to win, but left the game, not realizing HuK's Void Rays were hallucinated. IdrA would often be the last foreigner or Zerg player left in a tournament, especially with the influx of South Korean players in international tournaments through the GSL/MLG exchange program but drew harsh criticism by sometimes seceding matches with a notable advantage and displaying a culture of defeat in the Protoss vs Zerg match-up that he judged unbalanced and thus unwinnable. Later on in June, IdrA participated in DreamHack Summer 2011 and saw a disappointing result with a 3–2 score in the group stages, although he was allegedly ill throughout most of the weekend. Despite his poor finish in the Top 16, losing to MC, he began to play many of his games out for a longer duration even with a disadvantage.

Summer 2011 was punctuated by more modest performances but a consolidation of his position as one of the best foreigner Zerg players, although he continued to struggle with South Korean players, losing to BoxeR in MLG Anaheim 2011 in group play (placing 9th overall), to Heart in the finals of the TeamSpeak TL Open 21 and to Terran players Bomber, Noblesse and SjoW at MLG Raleigh 2011, only finishing 20th, his worst performance in an MLG tournament to date. Invited to the 2011 North American Battle.net Invitational, IdrA would lose to Sheth and place fourth in the tournament behind HuK. He however claimed revenge over Sheth and won the WOGL IeSF US Qualifier that took place in Korea. After EG acquired his long-time rival HuK, it was announced that IdrA would travel back to Korea to train later in the year.

September 2011 marked a change with a stronger international presence, as IdrA played in various tournaments around the globe. IdrA participated in the DreamHack Valencia Invitational 2011 alongside seven other players including teammate HuK, South Koreans HerO, Rain, and DongRaeGu, Sweden's ThorZaIN and NaNiwa, and local representative LucifroN where he was quickly eliminated by HerO. He then met more success in IEM Season VI - Global Challenge Guangzhou, claiming the first place, crushing his opponents, beating South Korean player Revival 3–1, teammate PuMa 3–0, and finally elfi in the grand finals 3–1. After his performance in this tournament, many casters have noted that IdrA had improved significantly in his mental state, and had started to heavily employ counter-attacks, aggressive openings, and upgrades along with his usual macro style.

Back on US soil in MLG Orlando, IdrA would place 4th, his best rank since MLG Columbus, impressively defeating on the way BoxeR, HongUn and Bomber but losing again to his rival MC. Less than a week later, he participated in the Electronic Sports World Cup 2011 in Paris, dominating the group play, but surprisingly losing to the Russian Zerg player LiveZerg in the first round of the playoffs. November would continue the trend with the ASUS ROG Stars Invite in Finland where IdrA convincingly knocked out SjoW, White-Ra and SeleCT to win the tournament, followed by MLG Providence and DreamHack Winter 2011 in Sweden.

IdrA participated in the North American Star League Season 2 in Division 3 with MorroW, HwangSin, KiWiKaKi, Jinro, SjoW, Socke and Chinese Terran SoftBall. IdrA would finish second in his group behind MorroW, losing only to Socke and MorroW with a final score of 5–2. At the Grand Finals in Ontario, he demolished his first opponent Strelok 3-0 and advanced to play PuMa, but fell 0–3 to his teammate and was eliminated with a RO8 finish and a $3,000 prize.

IdrA qualified for the MLG Winter Arena 2012 due to his performance at MLG Providence. There, he faced quick elimination from the winners' bracket by FXO's Oz 2-1 and would be ousted from the tournament itself by NesTea in the losers' bracket 2–0.

IdrA was one of the participants of the IEM Season VI World Championship, where he was placed into Group D with Kas, ReaL, DarKFoRcE, SuperNova, and Feast. He placed last in the group with a total score of 1–4, losing against every player in his group save for SuperNova, eliminating his presence in the tournament. IdrA would also offer commentary and analysis alongside several other players.

IdrA participated in IPL 4 (qualifying due to being a winner of one of the previous three events) and was seeded into Group D with an ensemble of vicious South Korean players: Bomber, MMA, jjakji and ByuN. IdrA would face a brutally quick elimination from the tournament, placing last in his group with a total score of 0–4, taking only two games off of Bomber and jjakji respectively. IdrA's final placing in IPL 4 would be one of the 17-20th spots alongside his teammate PuMa with a $1,000 prize.

IdrA continued a spree of modest performances, his next event being the MLG Spring Arena 2. In the first round, he was defeated by Socke 2–0, dropping down to the loser's bracket. There however he would face another rapid elimination by Dream, who swept him 2-0 as well. He would ultimately take the 25th-32nd place.

IdrA would return to compete in the MLG 2012 Spring Championship, seeded into the Open Winner's Bracket Round 4 due to his performance in the Spring Arena 2. IdrA fell to the loser's bracket in his first match against former teammate Axslav 2–1. There he would fight valiantly for survival defeating TAiLS 2-1 and STX 2-0 before being eliminated by Sleep 2–0. IdrA would take a poor 33rd-40th place in the tournament's conclusion.

His next tournament would be HomeStory Cup V, where in the first group stage he was placed into Group B against BlinG, Bly and Cloud. IdrA was able to place first in his group with a score of 3-0 (winning 6 games and losing 1), dominating his opponents—many saw this as a return to form. However, IdrA would not be able to replicate his success in the second group stage (the Ro16) in Group A against HasuObs, Sleep and Happy, where he placed last in his group with a score of 1–4, taking only one game off of Sleep and with no match against Happy. IdrA was eliminated with a Ro16 placement. In addition to participating in the tournament itself, IdrA would also commentate many games alongside his teammate iNcontroL.

=== Return to Korea and Professional Pause ===
IdrA and teammates HuK, PuMa and DeMusliM would head to Korea, staying in the SlayerS team house with the likes of Cella, MMA, and BoxeR himself. Though his main goal was to train in Korea, IdrA stated his intent to compete in Code A and hopefully Code S and would also stream regularly during his stay. On December 14, 2011, it was announced that IdrA had attained a Code S spot along with fellow Zerg player Sen for the 2012 Global StarCraft II League Season 1. His return to Code S was not as successful as his last though, as he would face off against two Zerg players in his group NesTea and Lucky who would both end up beating IdrA, therefore placing him last in the group and sent down to Code A. He then lost to Avenge 0–2 in the round of 48 of Code A. This would also be the start of a long slump for IdrA.

Shortly afterwards IdrA participated in first chapter of the Iron Squid where he was seeded into Group B along with MC, Symbol, Mvp, and ThorZaIN. IdrA started off with losing to MC and Symbol. Although he did beat both Mvp and ThorZaIN afterwards, this was not enough, and he was knocked out of the tournament in the first round.

What followed was a long string of early eliminations from tournaments. He participated in MLG Winter Arena where he lost to Oz and then NesTea. At IEM Season VI - World Championship he ended up on last place in his group with a 1–4 score. In the MLG Winter Championship he first won against Jinro in the Open Bracket round 5 where he was seeded. He then lost to JYP and Polt and was knocked out of the tournament. At IPL 4 IdrA didn't manage to win a single match going 0–4 in his group. At MLG Spring Arena 2 IdrA was knocked out in round 1 by Socke and Dream.

IdrA did begin showing signs of recovery towards the summer of 2012. At HomeStory Cup V IdrA went 3–0 in the Ro32 beating ClouD, BlinG, and Bly. In the Ro16, IdrA lost to HasuObs and Sleep knocking him out of the tournament. At the ASUS ROG Summer 2012 IdrA advanced from the Ro32 losing only to TaeJa who, at the time, was considered the best TvZ player in the world. However, much like in HomeStory Cup, IdrA was once again knocked out of the Ro16 without winning a single game in his group.

At the MLG Fall Championship IdrA beat Apocalypse and Glon to move on to the championship bracket. Here he lost to TheSTC and, after beating Grubby, BabyKnight knocking him into Championship Losers Round 2 where he was knocked out by Soulkey.

=== World Championship Series 2012 ===
From June 8 to June 10, 2012, IdrA participated in the World Championship Series Nationals: USA. IdrA took down Spades and EifeR before falling to the losers bracket after losing to ViBE. In the losers bracket, IdrA defeated KawaiiRice, Fitzyhere, Perfect, Illusion, and RaNgeD to advance into the final bracket. His reign ended there as he lost to daisuki by a score of 1-2 and took 4th place.

Qualifying for the WCS North America Finals from his fourth-place finish, IdrA defeated Stalife and Maker before losing to State in round 3. Falling into the losers bracket he defeated teammate Suppy, Illusion, Insur allowing him to reach the losers final. Here he defeated MajOr, giving him the chance to face ViBE, whom he had lost previously to in the USA Nationals. He would again lose, again with a 2:1 score, taking 3rd place with it and qualifying for the World Championship Finals.

From November 17 to 18 IdrA took part in the World Championship Finals. Placed in what many considered to be the group of death IdrA pulled two surprise wins, defeating KeSPA player RorO and teammate Stephano both 2:0 and finishing top in his group. Moving on to the round of 16 he faced another KeSPA player, Rain. This time IdrA would be defeated, losing by a score of 3:1 and getting knocked out of the tournament.

=== WCS 2013 and release from EG ===
At the end of March, while in a ladder game against Capoch, IdrA said the following:

[...]
i genuinely hope something bad happens to you
like you get cancer or something

— Greg "IdrA" Fields, screenshot of IdrA's stream from imgur.com

This comment caused some discussion in the community and comments such as "when does EG management step in and suspend him for this shit?" were voiced. This incident prompted EG's sponsors to get in touch with the team's CEO, Alex Garfield. Garfield assured them that Greg would not repeat this kind of behavior in the future.

On May 7, IdrA partook in a discussion thread on Teamliquid.net about his then team, Evil Geniuses, where he replied to another poster in the following manner:

[...] you're all a bunch of fucks
it just so happens i get paid to treat you like it. it's fucking awesome.

— Greg "IdrA" Fields, 'The Giant', Evil Geniuses from Teamliquid.net

During this same time, IdrA was seeded into the round of 32 in WCS America. On May 8, IdrA played his first WCS match in 2013 against Polt, where he again quit early from his games in potentially behind but still not hopeless situations. He then went 0–2 against his teammate Revival, dropping down to the Challenger league. After these games, an image of his post was posted on Reddit.

On the following day, May 9, while EG's team captain iNcontroL was live on air on State of the Game and giving his thoughts on the situation, Alex Garfield released an official press statement where he said the following:

There's no easy way to say this, so I'm just going to say it.

After having him on our roster for nearly three years, we have decided to release IdrA from the Evil Geniuses StarCraft 2 team.

As most of you are already aware, we let our players be themselves. [...] This is why it was never really an issue for us that Greg can be rude to his opponents in games, or that he usually speaks his mind very bluntly and directly. But, to us, there's a very big difference between a player being disrespectful to an opponent in a ladder match, and a player being disrespectful to the entire community of people who, via their own enthusiasm and passion for the entertainment product he creates, actually make his profession possible.

— Alexander Garfield, Evil Geniuses Releases Greg "IdrA" Fields from Teamliquid.net

itmeJP later announced that IdrA was to be a guest on an impromptu 'mini Real Talk' focusing on his departure from EG and his plans for the future. He said that although he was shocked when the news first reached him due to being a long-running team member, he was not particularly outraged at the decision and felt that EG handled it in a professional manner. While addressing the controversy that arose from his comments on the TeamLiquid forums, he noted that 'real fans' would not take his comments seriously, at the same time criticizing parts of the community that he felt were feeding on drama.

IdrA announced that he was quitting competitive StarCraft II play. He stated that the competition was not "interesting, challenging or satisfying to me as it used to be", and that he did not enjoy the game as much as he enjoyed competing, acknowledging the stagnancy of his results. He also stated that the game "...pales in comparison to Brood War". IdrA then stated his intent to focus on content creation, analytical commentary, and more fan interaction, much like his erstwhile teammate iNcontroL (but "less funny").

He also discussed his situation with EG before he was released, saying he had considered not signing again due to his lack of results but reaching an agreement with Alex Garfield that he "could not refuse", the alternatives being flat-out retirement or going independent and focusing on content creation. He stated that there were no hard feelings with EG or any of his former teammates, and looked forward to having more freedom in his career. However, IdrA added that he had difficulties with his former teammate DeMusliM, in response to rumors of a falling out on the show Inside the Game despite IdrA recommending DeMusliM to join EG in 2011. He noted that their relationship had deteriorated as time went on.

=== Transition to Caster, Retirement & Heroes Return ===
After IdrA retired he expressed his feelings that he wanted to be more of a content producer/caster. His first opportunity to cast after retirement would come with TotalBiscuit's Shoutcraft America event where he cast alongside TotalBiscuit. The next tournament he cast was ASUS ROG Summer 2013, after which the community expressed a great deal of pleasure with IdrA's casting, as a Teamliquid.net thread popped up after the event.

He was also positively received when he cast IEM Season VIII - Singapore with ESL alongside Kaelaris, ToD, and Maynarde and was also invited to cast alongside TotalBiscuit for the NaNiwa-Scarlett Bitcoin show match.

Later in February 2014, IdrA announced that he would be retiring from eSports entirely and going back to school in a Team Liquid post. However, after much speculation surrounding his return for Heroes of the Storm, Evil Geniuses confirmed that they were re-signing him as part of their HotS team to compete at BlizzCon 2014 alongside LzGaMeR and newcomers John "Chillatech" Peacock, Guillaume "Keylax" Ouellet, and Kayla "Faye" Murray.

== Other StarCraft Activities ==
Apart from participating in most major North American and European tournaments and leagues, IdrA has been an active member of the community and often provides analytical commentary as a guest caster for various tournaments. He was one of the main casters for the Evil Geniuses Master's Cup Series Season V and Season VI along with djWHEAT, iNcontroL, and PainUser. As a pundit, he collaborates with the same team for the weekly show Inside the Game and makes regular appearances on State of the Game. IdrA has released a number of in-depth replay analyses on YouTube, which look at his memorable games versus players such as MC, Tyler, HuK and KiWiKaKi, and occasionally commentates his ladder games while streaming. IdrA is also one of the few professional players who is still active on the TeamLiquid.net forums. His sarcastic and often plainly offensive comments have led to a series of temporary bans and have played a large role in his notoriety.
