= Greg Fields =

Greg Fields may refer to:

- Greg Fidelman (born 1965), American record producer sometimes credited as Greg Fields
- Greg Fields (American football) (born 1955), American football player
- Greg "IdrA" Fields (born 1989), American esports player
