= Lim Yo-hwan =

South Korean esports player (born 1980)

BoxeR
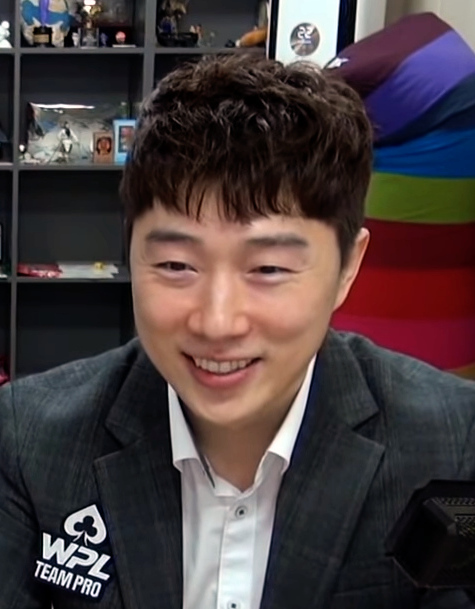
- Lim Yo-hwan in 2021

Personal information
- Name: 임요환 (Lim Yo-hwan)
- Nickname: The Terran Emperor
- Born: September 4, 1980 (age 46)
- Nationality: South Korean

Career information
- Games: StarCraft; StarCraft II
- Playing career: 1999–2013
- Role: Terran
- Coaching career: 2012–2013

Team history

As player:
- 2000–2002: IS
- 2002–2003: Orion
- 2003–2004: 4U
- 2004–2006: SK Telecom T1
- 2006–2008: Air Force ACE
- 2008–2010: SK Telecom T1
- 2010–2012: SlayerS

As coach:
- 2012–2013: SK Telecom T1

Lim Yo-hwan (Korean: 임요환; Hanja: 林遙煥, born September 4, 1980), known online as SlayerS_'BoxeR' (usually shortened to BoxeR), is a former professional player of the real-time strategy videogame series StarCraft. He is often referred to as "The Terran Emperor", or simply "The Emperor", and is widely considered to be one of the greatest players in StarCraft history, as well as being a pop culture icon in South Korea.

Lim won his first StarCraft: Brood War tournament in 1999. From 2001 to 2002, he won multiple major championships, including two OnGameNet Starleague titles and two World Cyber Games gold medals. In 2002, he also created the team Team Orion, which later became SK Telecom T1 (SKT T1) in 2004. He began his compulsory military service in 2006, where he played on South Korea's newly formed Air Force esports team Airforce Challenge E-sports. In late 2010, he retired from StarCraft: Brood War and founded the StarCraft II team SlayerS. He then briefly returned to SKT T1 as a coach in 2012 before retiring due to health related issues. Lim finished his playing career with a record of 603 wins and 430 losses (58.4%).

Following his retirement from esports, Lim became a professional poker player. He won his first Asian Poker Tour (APT) title in September 2018 and his second in January 2019.

== Career ==
=== Early career (1998–2000) ===
In 1998, during his third year at Seongbo High School in Seoul, South Korea, Lim developed a passion for the video game StarCraft. Initially playing as the Protoss race, he later switched to the Terran race following a game patch implementation.

After the release of the StarCraft expansion, StarCraft: Brood War, Lim attempted to create a guild called Slayer. However, facing difficulties in establishing it, he adopted the Battle.net ID SlayerS_'BoxeR' instead. As he achieved high rankings on Battle.net, his ID gained widespread recognition. It was during this time, in August 1999, that Kim Yang-joong, the president of management company Sinabro, approached Lim while he was playing at a PC Bang. Kim offered him the opportunity to become a professional gamer. After accepting the offer, Lim had to seek his parents' approval, as pursuing a career in video gaming was an unconventional choice at the time. After considerable effort, Lim convinced his parents, allowing him to sign with Sinabro. In December 1999, Lim secured his first tournament victory at the SBS Multi-Game Championship. Almost a year later, in October 2000, he joined team IS, which later became known as Hwaseung OZ.

=== The first bonjwa (2001–2003) ===
The term "Royal Road" is used to describe a player's achievement of winning an OnGameNet Starleague (OSL) title in their rookie season. Despite the perceived weakness of the Terran race, Lim defied expectations and walked the Royal Road in the 2001 Hanbitsoft OSL. He advanced to the semifinals, where he faced and defeated Park "Kingdom" Yong-wook with a score of 2–1. In the grand finals, he went on to defeat Jang "JinNam" Jin-nam with a score of 3–0, becoming only the third player to walk the Royal Road. Throughout the tournament, Lim won 11 games and lost only one. His success proved that the Terran race was a viable option in StarCraft, earning him the nickname "The Hope of Terran". Lim continued his winning streak by securing the championship in the subsequent OSL, the 2001 Coca-Cola OSL. In the finals, he faced Hong "Storm" Jin-Ho, defeating him with a score of 3–2. Lim's achievements extended beyond OSL titles. He also won a gold medal at the World Cyber Games 2001, where he emerged victorious against Bertrand "ElkY" Grospellier. Additionally, he finished as the runner-up in the 2001 SKY OSL, losing to Kim "Garimto" Dong-soo in the finals.

In April 2002, Lim secured another championship title at the 2002 KPGA 1st Tour. However, his performance in the first OSL event of the year, the 2002 NATE OSL, was not as successful as he was eliminated in the round of 16. In the subsequent OSL, the 2002 SKY OSL, he reached the finals but suffered a loss to Park "Reach" Jeong-seok, ultimately finishing in second place. At the end of the year, Lim added another achievement to his list by winning his second consecutive gold medal at the World Cyber Games 2002. Due to his performances and consistent victories between 2000 and 2002, Lim became recognized as StarCraft's first "bonjwa", a player who dominates all others for an extended period. It was around this time that he also earned the nickname "The Terran Emperor."

In January 2003, Lim secured another championship victory at the 2003 KTF Bigi Four Kings Battle. He faced off against Lee "NaDa" Yoon-yeol in the finals, emerging as the winner with a score of 2–1.

After his previous team, IS, disbanded, and with the Orion Group sponsoring him individually, Lim found himself without a team during the WCG 2002. In anticipation of the formation of the new professional StarCraft Proleague in 2003, Lim, along with manager Joo Hoon, established the team Orion in November 2002. Entering the KTF EVER Cup Proleague in March 2003, Orion was not initially expected to perform well and was often referred to as "Lim Yo-hwan's one-man team". The team faced personnel challenges at the start of the regular season, as two of their members were amateurs. However, midway through the season, they acquired two more players and finished the regular season in second place. On September 30, 2003, Orion became the Proleague champions by defeating Hanbit Stars in the finals with a score of 4–1.

Following their Proleague championship, the Orion Group made a decision not to re-sign any of their players and instead offered to sponsor Lim individually. However, Lim declined the individual sponsorship, as he believed that a team sponsorship held more value. As a result, he decided to rename the team to 4U. The 4U team continued to achieve success and went on to win another Proleague, the LG IBM MBC Team League. In April 2004, the South Korean wireless carrier SK Telecom acquired the team with a substantial investment of $2 million. This acquisition resulted in the official creation of the team known as SK Telecom T1.

=== Decline and military (2004–2010) ===
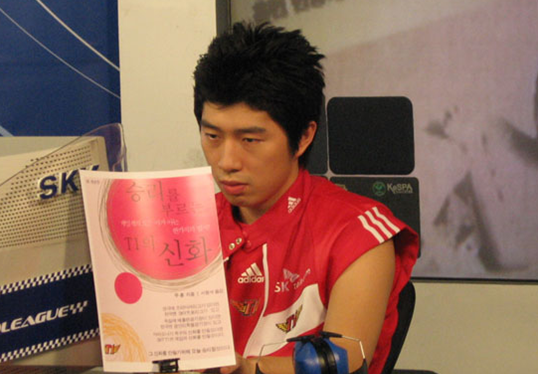
Lim at the 2006 Sky Proleague

As the years went by, Lim's win rate experienced a gradual decline. In 2001, his win rate stood at 73%. However, it dropped to 61% in 2002, followed by further declines to 55% in 2003 and 54% in 2004. During this period, Lim's status as a "bonjwa" started to fade as newer and younger players emerged in the competitive scene. Despite this, he still managed to achieve high placements in some premier tournaments. In 2004, Lim reached the finals of the EVER OSL, where he faced his teammate Choi "Cheater Terran" Yeon-sung (who was later known as iloveoov). However, he ultimately lost the match by a score of three to two. In 2005, Lim finished as the runner-up in the So1 OSL after a defeat in the finals against Oh "Anytime" Yeong-jong. Notably, Lim became the oldest person to reach the finals of an individual league. During that year, his contract with SK Telecom T1 was valued at $200,000, making it the largest esports contract in history at the time. In 2005 and 2006, Lim's win rates were recorded as 58% and 56%, respectively.

In October 2006, Lim began his mandatory military service in South Korea, joining the Republic of Korea Air Force. This service lasted for a period of 27 months. On April 1, 2007, the Air Force announced the creation of its own esports team, known as Airforce Challenge E-sports (ACE). Lim joined this team along with other former professional gamers, including his SK Telecom T1 teammate Sung "MuMyung" Hak-seung. The team's participation commenced with the 2007 season of the Proleague championship. During his time with the Airforce Challenge E-sports team, Lim achieved a total of 24 wins and 38 losses.

After completing his military service on December 21, 2008, Lim returned to his team, SK Telecom T1, as his contract with them was still in effect until 2010. His first match back with the team took place on January 17, 2009, in a match against ACE's Oh "Anytime" Yeong-jong in the Shinhan Bank Winners League, which was part of the 2008-09 Shinhan Bank Proleague. Although Lim lost that match, SK Telecom T1 went on to win the 2008-09 Shinhan Bank Proleague. It wasn't until October 25, 2009, that Lim secured his first win since returning from the Air Force. In a match against Hwaseung OZ's Park "Killer" Joon-oh in the 2009-10 Shinhan Bank Proleague, Lim emerged victorious. This win was significant as it made him both the first former Air Force player and the first player in his 30s to win a match in the Proleague.

=== StarCraft II (2010–2012) ===
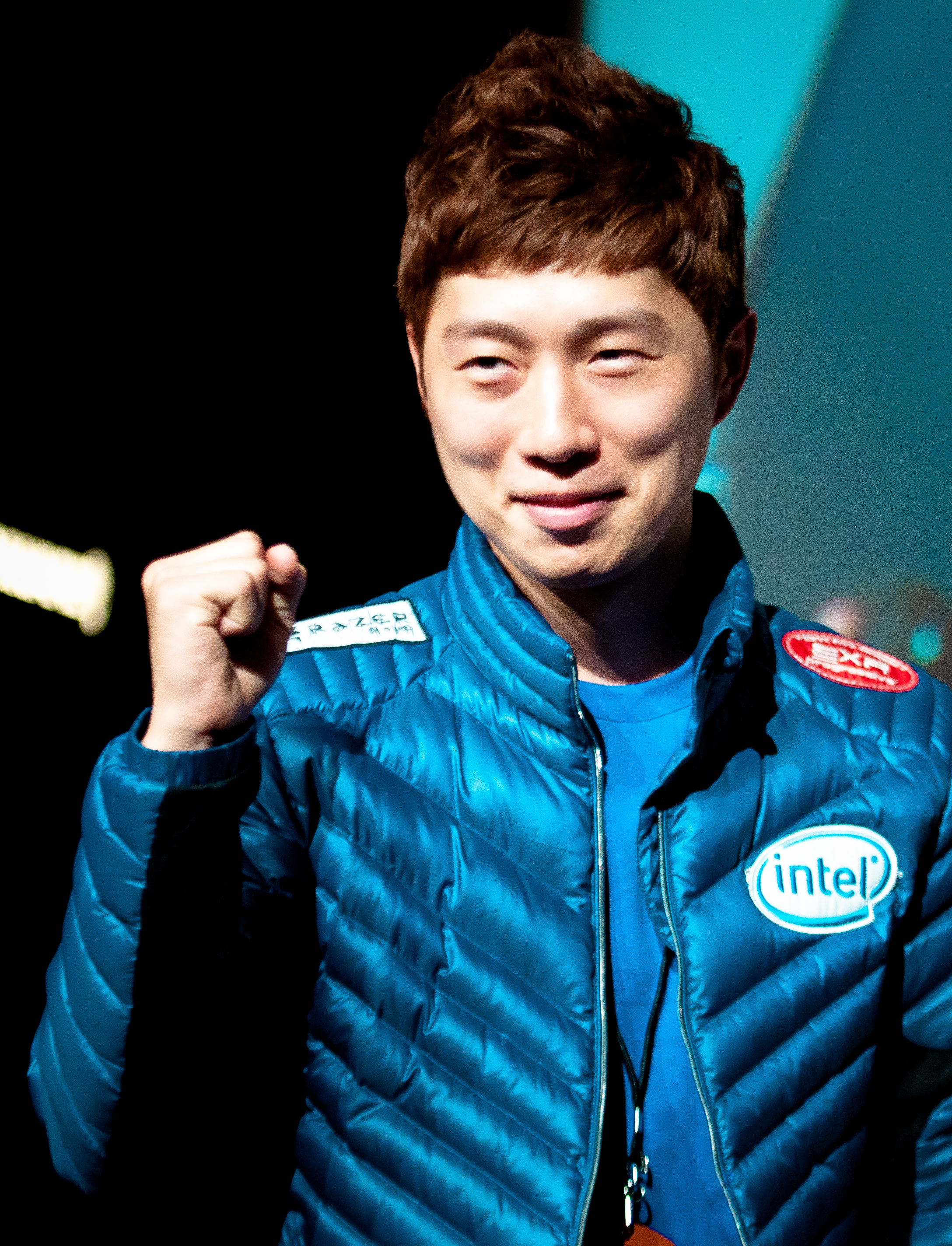
Lim at MLG Anaheim 2011

Lim's contract with SK Telecom T1 expired on August 31, 2010. He made an announcement on October 9, 2010, stating his decision to switch to playing StarCraft II professionally.

In October 2010, at BlizzCon, Lim and Kim "FruitDealer" Won-gi played in a highly anticipated StarCraft II exhibition match. Kim defeated Lim 2-0. In the depiction of this scene in the documentary BoxeR's Wings, after the loss, he was approached onstage by a Korean-American who "proclaims that Lim Yo-hwan is her idol, and that he makes her proud to be a Korean."

He planned to begin his professional career in StarCraft II by participating in the Global StarCraft II League (GSL) open tournament. During the GSL open tournament, Lim managed to reach the quarterfinals of the main event. In that stage, he faced Lee "NaDa" Yoon-yeol, who was regarded as one of the greatest players of all time and someone Lim had never defeated in a major event. The match between them, which marked Lim's first televised match in years, attracted millions of viewers and briefly crashed the internet in Korea due to its high viewership. Lim emerged victorious in this match. Subsequently, he faced Lim "NesTea" Jae-duk in the semifinals but was unable to secure a win, finishing the event in the top four. After experiencing difficulties playing without a team, Lim announced on November 9, 2010, that he would be forming a new StarCraft II team called SlayerS.

In March 2011, Lim was relegated from Code S, the highest ranked division in the Global StarCraft II League, to Code A. He subsequently, along with many other Korean players, applied to join the upcoming North American Star League (NASL). Following, Lim shifted his focus from competing in individual events to the Global StarCraft II Team League (GSTL). Under the banner of the SlayerS team, Lim and his teammates achieved success by winning both the March and May 2011 GSTL championships.

Lim received an invitation to compete at the 2011 Major League Gaming (MLG) event in Columbus, Ohio. However, he was dealing with tendonitis in his shoulder, an injury typically seen in individuals twice his age. Due to his condition, Lim decided to give his invitation to his teammate Moon "MMA" Sung-won. Ultimately, MMA went on to win the event. In July 2011, Lim participated in the MLG Pro Circuit in Anaheim. During the group stage of the event, Lim performed well, remaining undefeated and advancing to the double-elimination tournament stage. In the upper bracket semifinals, he defeated Park "Rain" Seo-yong, securing a place in the upper bracket final against Jeong "Mvp" Jong-hyeon, a two-time GSL champion. Lim lost to Mvp in the upper bracket final and was subsequently sent to the lower bracket final. In the lower bracket final, Lim faced his teammate MMA. While he lost the first game of the match, he managed to win the second game, equalizing the series. However, MMA emerged victorious in the third match, leading Lim to finish the event in third place.

=== Coaching (2012–2013) ===
In April 2012, it was reported that Lim would be taking a break from professional play in order to undergo physical therapy. He had been experiencing shoulder pain for over a year, which limited his ability to play more than five games a day. In addition, he mentioned dealing with multiple injuries, including spinal pain, inflammation, and pain in his wrists, waist, neck, and other areas. Starting from May 1, 2012, Lim's shoulder injury prevented him from participating in competitive matches. As a result, he forfeited his GSL matches and withdrew from competition.

On August 16, 2012, SK Telecom T1 announced that Lim had joined the team as a coach, signing a one-year contract. After serving as a coach for eight months, Lim was promoted to the position of head coach on April 3, 2013. However, Lim made the decision to retire from professional esports entirely on September 26, 2013, citing health complications.

== Player profile ==
During the early time in his career he innovated heavily, creating many new strategies that saw much use afterward, most notably making much more effective use of the Terran Dropship unit than had previously been achieved. He also gained a reputation for being able to turn around matches against the odds and having excellent micromanagement (unit control) skills. He would often continue the game, despite heavy disadvantages, and still pull out a victory. In contrast, some commentators consider poor macromanagement (economy/unit production) skills his weakness, in comparison to other top-level professional StarCraft players.

== Legacy ==
Lim was integral in popularizing StarCraft and esports around the world in the 2000s, becoming a pop culture icon. In 2003, the Korean executive branch named Lim a "cultural celebrity" in its annual report on the culture industry. PGR21.com's Seiji wrote:

In the NBA, Michael Jordan was but one athlete, but had the influencing power beyond that of a mere basketball player. "It is safe to say that because of his presence, the NBA grew rapidly and basketball was no longer the American game, but an international sport. Would it be an overstatement if one were to say that Lim Yo Hwan has a value like Michael Jordan? The greatest significance Lim Yo Hwan has towards e-sports is that he has transformed it from a festival of mere maniacs to a mainstream culture that is now broadcasted [sic] by the media. His value can be seen as he raised the understanding of what was once considered as a mere childish game to the dignified acceptance by all as part of the mainstream culture.

The Australian Broadcasting Corporation also wrote that Lim was "the most prominent gamer on the planet for any computer game that's ever existed."

Throughout his playing career, Lim recorded a total of 603 wins and 430 losses, with a win rate of 58.4%, in 1033 matches.

== Awards and honors ==
Individual titles

- 1999 SBS Multi-Game Championship
- 2000 Samsung Digital Cup KIGL King of Kings
- 2000 M.police Game League
- 2000 Korea.cnet Game Tournament
- 2001 World Cyber Games
- 2001 Coca-Cola Ongamenet Starleague
- 2001 Hanbitsoft Ongamenet Starleague
- 2001 3rd Game-Q Starleague
- 2001 Zzgame.com Progamer 32 Invitational
- 2002 World Cyber Games
- 2002 KPGA 1st Tour
- 2003 KTF Bigi 4 Kings
- 2003 Toona BIG 4 SPECIAL
- 2004 KT Megapass Nespot Premierleauge

Team titles

- 2003 KTF EVER Cup (Orion)
- 2003–04 LG IBM MBC Team League (Orion)
- 2004 Tucsan MBCGame Team League (SK Telecom T1)
- 2005 SKY Proleague Season One (SK Telecom T1)
- 2005 SKY Proleague Season Two (SK Telecom T1)
- 2005 SKY Proleague Grand Final (SK Telecom T1)
- 2006 SKY Proleague Season One (SK Telecom T1)
- 2008–09 Shinhan Bank Proleague (SK Telecom T1)
- 2011 GSTL March (SlayerS)
- 2011 GSTL May (SlayerS)

Records

- Most wins on televised matches (500)
- First player to win more than one OSL (Hanbitsoft 2001, Coca-Cola 2001), and the first to win two consecutive OSLs
- First player to make the OSL finals three times in a row
- First player to achieve 100 wins in Ongamenet Starleagues (OSL)
- Longest time to hold first place in KeSPA rankings – 17 months

Halls of Fame

- Korea Esports Hall of Fame – Class of 2018
- Esports Hall of Fame StarCraft: Brood War – Class of 2012
- ESL Hall of Fame – Class of 2019

Media

- Named ESReality's "Greatest Gamer of All Time"
- Named one of MTV's "Top 10 Most Influential Gamers of All Time"
- Esports Awards Lifetime Achievement Award – 2020

== Post-retirement ==
=== Poker ===
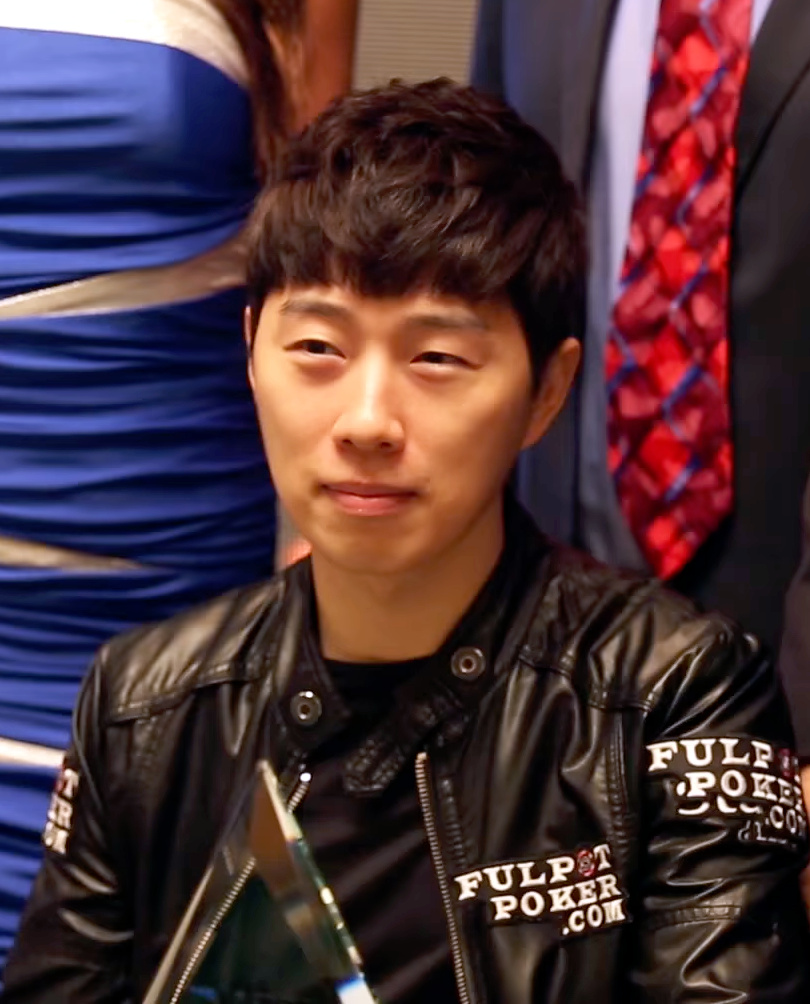
Lim during the 2014 WPT National Philippines

In December 2013, Lim embarked on a new career path as a professional poker player after signing with Me2on. His first notable tournament appearance was at the Macau Poker Cup in January 2014. Despite being relatively new to the poker scene, he reached the final table and finished in eighth place out of 235 participants. Over the years, Lim continued to compete in various poker tournaments. In 2016, he secured his first tournament title at the Asian Poker Tour (APT) Kickoff Manila. Later that year, he added another title to his name by winning the APT Macau.

In September 2018, Lim achieved a significant milestone in his poker career by winning the APT Philippines Championships II event. In the final heads-up battle, he successfully eliminated Si Yang Phua to claim the championship title. This victory marked his first-ever APT championship win and earned him a substantial prize money of approximately US$53,547.73. The following year, he continued his success in the APT series by securing his second APT Championship title at the 2019 APT Vietnam Kickoff series in January. In heads up against Slaven Popov, who held a two-to-one chip lead, Lim emerged victorious. The final hand saw him clinching the win with a nut flush on the board. The victory brought him a prize of $87,946, his largest live cash earnings to date, and it also propelled him to the 10th position on South Korea's all-time money list.

At the 2020 APT Kick-Off Vietnam, Lim achieved another milestone in his poker career by winning his first-ever APT Super High Rollers title. He earned a prize of approximately $32,200. By January 2023, Lim's live earnings from poker tournaments had surpassed $714,265.

=== Show matches ===
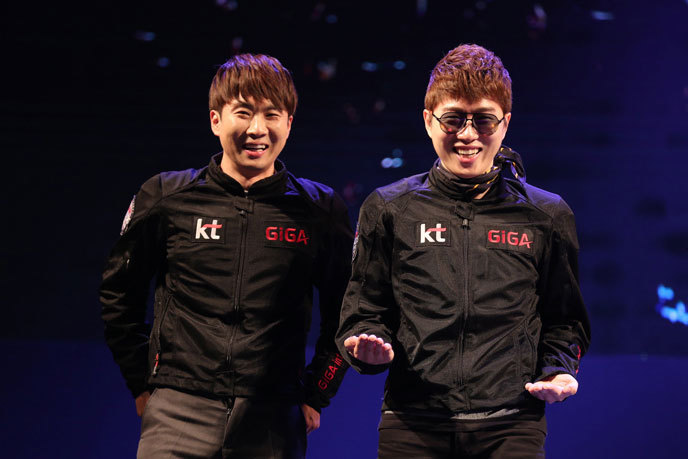
Lee "NaDa" Yoon-yeol (left) and Lim "BoxeR" Yo-hwan (right) at the KT GiGA Legends Match

On November 6, 2015, Lim participated in a two-versus-two exhibition show match in StarCraft at BlizzCon 2015. On February 20, 2016, Lim took part in the KT GiGA Legends Match, a show match that included three other prominent StarCraft players: Guillaume "Grrrr..." Patry, Lee "NaDa" Yoon-yeol, and Hong "YellOw" Jin-ho. Lim finished in third place at the event. Another show match involving Lim took place on February 22, 2022, called "Again Lim Jin-rok". It was a best-of-five series against YellOw. Lim emerged victorious with a score of three to two. The event garnered over 210,000 viewership.

== Personal life ==
Lim was born on September 4, 1980. In his youth, he was passionate about football and spent much of his time playing the sport. He enrolled at Wonkwang University in 2002 and graduated in 2006 with a bachelor's degree in game science. Following his undergraduate studies, he pursued a graduate degree at Sangmyung University's Graduate School of Digital Media.

During the 2008 Paralympic Games held in Beijing, Lim met South Korean actress and media personality Kim Ga-yeon. They began dating, and their relationship was publicly revealed in April 2010. In 2011, Lim and Kim filed for marriage without holding a ceremony. Their first child, a daughter, was born on August 1, 2015. Although they had married five years earlier, they held a wedding ceremony on May 6, 2016.

== Media figure ==
=== Endorsements ===
Lim has enjoyed sponsorship deals with various companies throughout his career, including LG and Intel. In 2011, he became an Intel spokesman and appeared in the Visual Life commercial series alongside Girls' Generation (SNSD). The commercial featured a Terran vs. Zerg (TvZ) match between him and Girls' Generation member Im Yoona. The scene was set in the top-floor cafeteria of the SM Entertainment office in Chungdamdong to promote the gaming capabilities of Intel computers. During the commercial shoot, Lim and Im exchanged autographs, with Im signing Lim's keyboard. However, the commercial was eventually pulled from Korean TV when Intel executives discovered that the gameplay footage was a replay of one of Lim's earlier televised matches.

=== Film and television ===
Lim made several appearances in various television programs and films. In 2001, he appeared on an episode of KBS's Morning Yard, and in 2006, he was featured in a KBS Power Interview. He has also participated in entertainment programs such as Let's Go! Dream Team Season 2 and Brain Survivor. He has also served as a presenter at award shows, including the Seoul Music Awards in 2004 and the Melon Music Awards in 2009. Lim has showcased his acting skills in the 2002 film Can't Live Without Robbery and the KBS soap opera This is Love. Additionally, he made a special guest appearance on Saturday Night Live Korea in November 2013. In 2014, Lim was a cast member of The Genius: Rule Breaker. In 2022, he participated as a contestant on the web show Accomplices.

=== Books ===
Lim has authored several books focusing on his life and StarCraft.

- Lim Yo-hwan's Dropship (Minu Communications, 2001).
- (Try and Be) As Crazy As Me (2004).

== See also ==
- StarCraft professional competition
