= HuK =

American-Canadian professional esports player

Chris Loranger
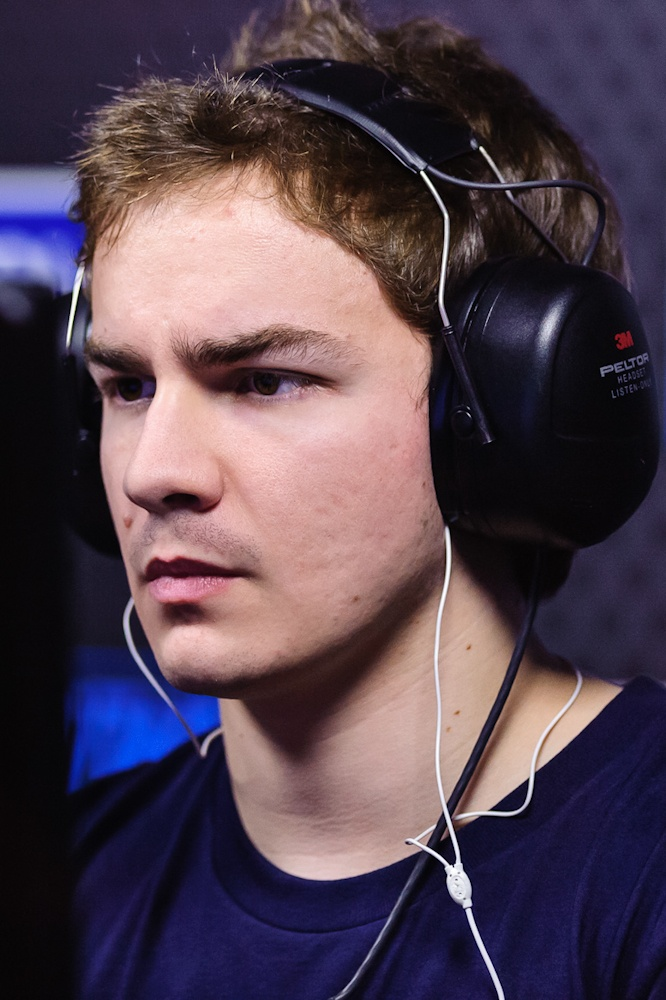
- Loranger in 2012

Personal information
- Born: 1989 or 1990 (age 36–37)
- Nationality: American, Canadian

Career information
- Games: StarCraft II; Overwatch
- Playing career: 2010–2017
- Roles: Player (StarCraft II); Executive (Overwatch)

Team history
- As player
- 2010: VT Gaming
- 2010: Millenium
- 2010–2011: Team Liquid
- 2011–2017: Evil Geniuses
- As executive
- 2018–2022: Boston Uprising

Career highlights and awards
- 2× MLG champion (2010, 2011); DreamHack champion (2011)

Chris Loranger, better known as HuK, is a former professional Starcraft II player and former president of gaming for the Boston Uprising of the Overwatch League.

Loranger spent most of his Starcraft II career playing for Evil Geniuses. He was the first player to win two Major League Gaming championships and one of the few foreigners to compete in the Global StarCraft II League in Video games in South Korea.

== Playing career ==
=== VT Gaming ===
Loranger began his professional StarCraft II career with VT Gaming.

=== Millenium ===
In June 2010, Loranger signed a three-month contract with French organization Millenium. Two months later, in August, Loranger took home the first-ever Major League Gaming (MLG) StarCraft II tournament title, defeating Jonathan "Kiwikaki" Garneau in the MLG Raleigh 2010 finals.

=== Team Liquid ===
On September 25, 2010, Team Liquid announced that Loranger would be joining their team. After moving to the Team Liquid team house in Incheon, Korea in January 2011, Loranger competed in Code A, the second-tier bracket, of the Global StarCraft II League (GSL). In May 2011, he advanced to Code S, the top-tier bracket where the best 32 players competed. Loranger competed in the GSL May 2011 tournament, and after failing to advance to the Code S Round of 16, he defeated Mun "MMA" Seong Won in an Up & Down match to retain his Code S status.

In between the May and July GSL tournaments, Loranger took home two major offline tournament titles. He defeated Jang "Moon" Jae Ho at DreamHack Summer 2011 in the finals in Jönköping, Sweden, and a week later, he took down Johan "NaNiwa" Lucchesi at the HomeStory Cup III in Krefeld, Germany.

Returning to Korea for the July 2011 GSL tournament, Loranger made it past the group stages to advance to the Code S Round of 16. However, he was eliminated in the first round by his teammate Jang "MC" Min-chul.

=== Evil Geniuses ===
In August 2011, Loranger joined Evil Geniuses, in a move that he described as "one of, if not the biggest team change in all of Starcraft history."

After several failed GSL runs, Loranger headed back to North America in October 2011 and picked up his second MLG championship at MLG Orlando 2011, making him the first player win two MLG titles. The next month, after five seasons in GSL Code S, Loranger was dropped down to Code A. He, again, returned to North America and competed in the 2011 MLG Pro Circuit Championship Providence; however, after dropping to the lower bracket, he was eliminated from the tournament by a 0–2 loss to Lee "Leenock" Dong Nyoung. After the loss, Loranger competed Season 2 of the North American Star League (NASL), but his struggles continued, as he was eliminated in the first round of playoffs by Dennis "HasuObs" Schneider.

Returning to South Korea, Loranger competed in GSL Code A, but he failed to qualify for GSL Code S. The same month, he competed in the World Cyber Games (WCG) 2011 in Busan, South Korea. Loranger found success in the group stages, finishing at the top of his group and qualifying for the Round of 16 of the tournament, but he fell in the first round. Four months later, in April 2012, he was knocked out of GSL Code A, prompting him to make the decision to shift his focus to American and European tournaments.

In January 2013, Loranger returned to South Korea to compete in the 2013 GSL Season 1; he qualified directly for Code S after finishing second in his Up & Down group, making him one-of-two foreigners in the league. He finished at the bottom of his Code S group, relegating him to Code A. After a first-round elimination in Code A, Loranger was knocked out of the GSL. Loranger returned to North America, and after two years without winning a major tournament, he won LANHAMMER 2013 in August 2013. Four months later, he swept Maru "MaSa" Kim 4–0 in the SHOUTCraft North America Winter Finals to claim his second major title of the year.

In September 2015, Loranger and his teammate Jang "MC" Min-chul won the 2015 Red Bull Battle Grounds.

On January 1, 2017, Evil Geniuses ended their nearly eight-year StarCraft II division and parted ways with Loranger, officially ending his playing career.

== Executive career ==
In 2017, Loranger was named President of Gaming for the Kraft Group, the owners of the Overwatch League team Boston Uprising. Loranger served a dual role as general manager and head coach of the Uprising; under his leadership, the team finished their first season with a 24-16 regular-season record and a loss in the first round of the playoffs. In June 2022, Loranger parted ways with the Uprising.

== Personal life ==
Chris holds a dual citizenship from Canada and the US, although he usually identifies solely as Canadian for competitions. He grew up in St. Petersburg, Florida. He had a troubled childhood, with his family affected by poverty, "domestic-, drug and alcohol abuse". After a run-in with the law during "rebellious" teenage years which led to a stay in juvenile prison, he moved to Cambridge, Ontario, Canada with his father. Later Chris praised his father's decision to move saying, "Had I not moved to Canada my family and I both agree that I would most likely be in the military, jail, or dead". Chris said during an interview, in May 2014, that he "played StarCraft II instead of joining military in order to eventually pay for school".
