= World Cyber Games 2002 =

The World Cyber Games 2002 was held in Daejeon, South Korea from the October 28th to the November 3rd. Total prize money was $300,000.

== Official games ==
- First-person shooter (FPS)
  - Half-Life: Counter-Strike
  - Quake III: Arena
  - Unreal Tournament
  - Halo
- Real-Time Strategy (RTS)
  - Age of Empires II: The Conquerors
  - StarCraft: Brood War
- Sport
  - 2002 FIFA World Cup

== Results ==
Event	Gold		Silver		Bronze	
Age of Empires II	(Japan) Nakamura Akihiro (Halen)		(Taiwan) Ming-Chu Chun (IamKen)		(Netherlands) Michel Rietdijk (Rip_Dreams)	
Half-Life: Counter-Strike	M19 (Russia)	Alexander Gribov (KaLbI4)	Nerve (Canada)	Matt Stevenson (bl00dsh0t)	Mousesports (Germany)	Jonas Bollack (Johnny R.)
Half-Life: Counter-Strike	M19 (Russia)	Alexei Kozlovski (NooK)	Nerve (Canada)	Ronan Ryan (#1Mug)	Mousesports (Germany)	Christian Pust (puCSt)
Half-Life: Counter-Strike	M19 (Russia)	Khan Viacheslav (Rider)	Nerve (Canada)	Vunya Griffith (Phage)	Mousesports (Germany)	Sebastian Schweitzer (silencer)
Half-Life: Counter-Strike	M19 (Russia)	Vitaly Pochinkin (MadFan)	Nerve (Canada)	Brad Dixon (Malone)	Mousesports (Germany)	Niels Karowski (Niels K.)
Half-Life: Counter-Strike	M19 (Russia)	Anton Kapitanov (Rado)	Nerve (Canada)	Matt Neville (neville)	Mousesports (Germany)	Roman Reinhardt (Roman R.)
2002 FIFA World Cup	(South Korea) Sang-Woo Hwang (ghanggi71)		(South Korea) Doo-Hyung Kim (Jaguar)		(Germany) Stefan Berndt (Stefan)	
Starcraft: Brood War	(South Korea) Yo-Hwan Lim (BoxeR)		(South Korea) Jin-Ho Hong (YellOw)		(Poland) Artur Michalak (Blackman')	
Unreal Tournament	(Germany) Christian Hock (GitzZz)		(United Kingdom) Samuel Boult (SHaggY)		(New Zealand) Nicholas McCabe (eVeNfLoW)	
Quake III: Arena	(Russia) Alexey Smaev (c58_uNkind)		(Spain) Alvaro Romero (Akiles)		(United States) Jason Sylka (Q4_Socrates)	
