= TotalBiscuit =

British game critic and commentator (1984–2018)

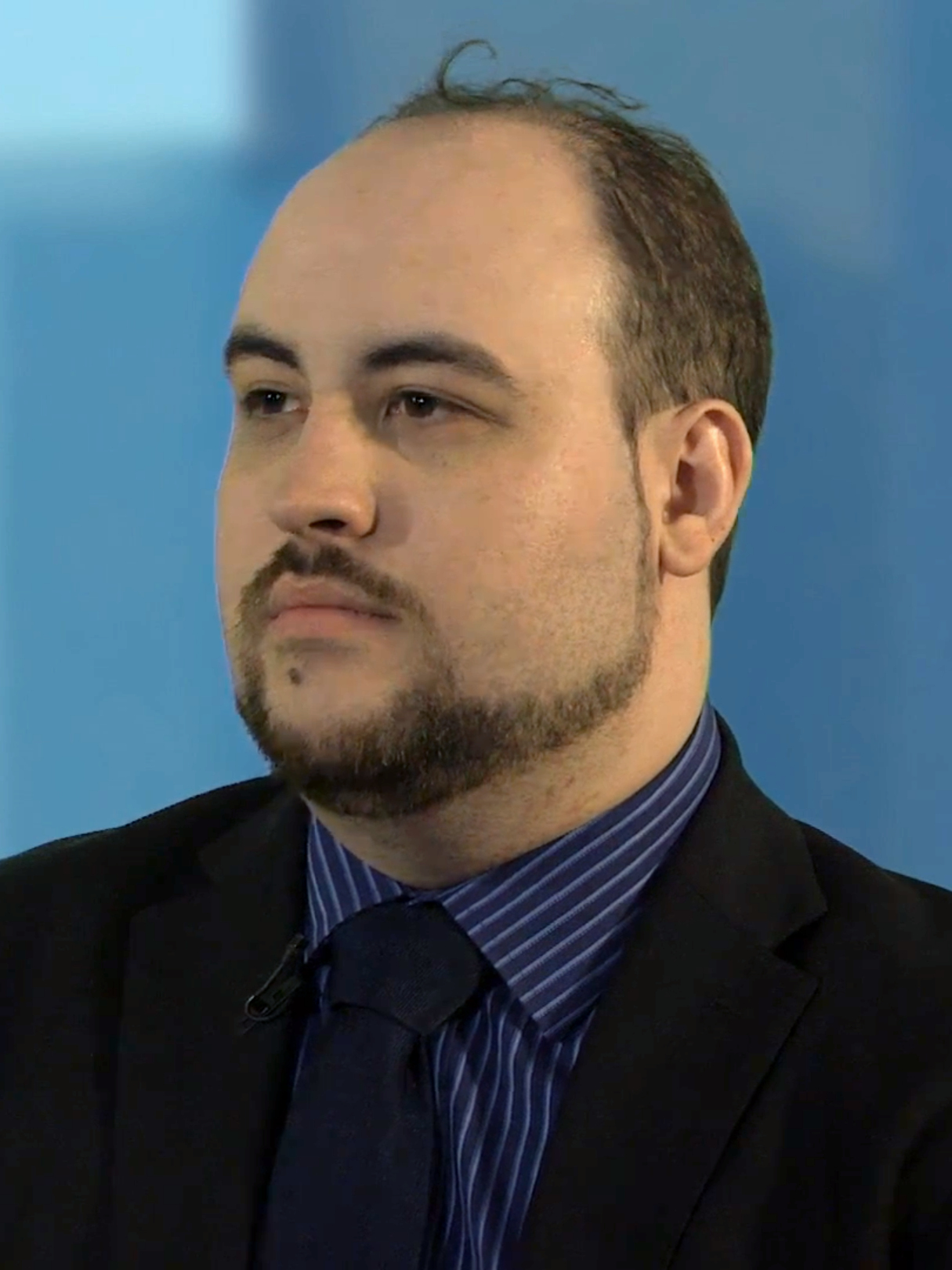
- Bain in 2013
- Born: John Peter Bain; 8 July 1984; Spennymoor, County Durham, England
- Died: 24 May 2018 (aged 33); Charlotte, North Carolina, US
- Cause of death: Bowel cancer
- Other names: The Cynical Brit; TotalHalibut
- Occupations: Video game critic; video game commentator; Esports caster
- Years active: 2005–2018
- Spouse: Genna Bain (m. 2007)
- Children: 1
- Awards: Trending Gamer (2014)

John Peter Bain (8 July 1984 – 24 May 2018), also known as TotalBiscuit (/ˌtoʊtəlˈbɪskɪt/ TOH-təl-BISS-kit, TB; sometimes The Cynical Brit or TotalHalibut), was a British video gaming commentator and game critic on YouTube. He was known for his role in professional shoutcasting and esports, and also known for his gaming commentary audio work on WCradio.com. According to Eurogamer, he gained a large following due to his video commentary on newly developed indie games and analysis of gaming news. Bain voiced strong support for consumer protection in the video gaming industry.

In October 2015 he announced that he had terminal cancer that had spread to his liver. He continued to critique games after the diagnosis, announcing his retirement only a few weeks before his death in May 2018.

== Biography ==
John Peter Bain was born in Spennymoor, County Durham, England, on 8 July 1984. He studied law at De Montfort University. While there, he hosted an extreme metal music show on Demon FM. He was diagnosed with dyspraxia.

From 2005 to 2010 Bain ran World of Warcraft Radio, a popular World of Warcraft fan radio station that received special acknowledgement and recognition from Blizzard Entertainment, the developers and publishing team of World of Warcraft. Bain was invited to the annual BlizzCon event in 2005 to provide coverage of the event, where he met Genna, his future wife and fellow YouTube personality. After Bain's tenure at World of Warcraft Radio, Bain began Cynicalbrit.com, where he posted more generalised gaming content.

In 2010, during the height of the Great Recession, Bain was laid off at his job at a financial advisory company. Bain's unemployment coincided with the beta release of World of Warcraft: Cataclysm, and he started producing videos of himself talking over gameplay on YouTube, hoping to earn money through the website's ad-revenue system. In the following weeks, the popularity of Bain's videos skyrocketed. A StarCraft 2 commentator named HuskyStarcraft approached Bain and invited him to join The Game Station, a network of gaming channels on YouTube.

=== Cancer diagnosis and death ===
In late April 2014 Bain announced he had a precancerous mass in his colon, the first indications of bowel cancer, a condition with which two of his grandparents had also been diagnosed. Within the month, Bain revealed that he had "full blown cancer" and was beginning chemotherapy treatments.

Bain reported in April 2015 that a CT scan showed a complete remission of the cancer. However, by October 2015, a newer CT scan showed that while the bowel cancer had been eliminated, the cancer had metastasised to his liver and was determined inoperable, with his doctors giving him a two-to-three-year life expectancy. Bain announced the disbanding of his esports team Axiom upon this news. By January 2016 Bain had also decided to distance himself from social media, while still focusing on making his game critique videos.

On 23 September 2016 he reported that his cancer had mutated, and a targeted treatment had shrunk his liver tumour by over 50%, from 5 cm (2.0 in) to 2 cm (0.79 in).

In October 2017 Bain appeared on the H3 Podcast, during which he discussed at length the current state of his cancer. He described his condition as "stable" (meaning the cancer was still present, but not spreading), and that it was stage IV cancer. On 22 November he tweeted that his chemotherapy had stopped working, but that there were other types he could try. He also noted that the cancer had not spread, but that its growth had started again.

In mid-April 2018 Bain was hospitalised for extreme back pain, from which the doctors discovered that the cancer was growing, applying pressure on his spine. While he underwent a clinical trial to combat the spread, the doctors found that the cancer had become too resistant to medication and conventional chemotherapy would be ineffective; he was also informed that his liver was failing. The doctors transferred him to palliative care with the option to resume clinical treatment if a trial compatible with his failing liver became available. Because of this, knowing he did not have long left to live, Bain announced he was fully retiring from game criticism, believing he was no longer capable of performing his work at a level that would satisfy himself and his fans. He planned to continue his Co-Optional podcast with his wife, Genna, with plans for her to take over the podcast in the event of his death.

On 24 May 2018 Bain's wife, Genna, announced through both her own and her husband's Twitter accounts that Bain had fallen into a hepatic coma and died.

=== Legacy ===
Multiple video game companies have released media with references and memorials to Bain. On 7 June 2018 Old School RuneScape developers Jagex added a grave to the game world decorated with a top hat, with the message "He was always there to ask and answer one simple question". Shortly after, on 9 September 2018, Blizzard Entertainment created a commemorative bundle in honour of Bain, with all sales profits going directly to Genna and their son, Orion. In the video game Mordhau released in 2019, you can find a grave dedicated to Bain, on the map "Camp". Two years after his death, the video game Doom Eternal features an easter egg of a top hat and a plaque reading "Slay Cancer", referencing Bain.

Bain was posthumously inducted into the ESL Esports Hall of Fame, and is the first non-competitive player to receive the honour.

Warhammer 40,000: Space Marine 2 was dedicated to Bain in memoriam. Bain previously featured its predecessor, Warhammer 40,000: Space Marine, in his WTF is...? series, to much enjoyment.

== Origin of online nicknames ==
Bain stated that the name TotalBiscuit was a quote taken from the Terry Pratchett novel Carpe Jugulum: "Besides, thought Agnes, I know for a fact there's people out there called Syphilidae Wilson and Yodel Lightley and Total Biscuit."

The moniker Cynical Brit came from the original introduction to his Blue Plz! radio broadcast: "Ladies and gentlemen, do not be alarmed, a Cynical Brit has been allowed on the air with a microphone. You will listen or the kitten we have hostage will be forced to fight a giant badger. Ladies and gentlemen, this is Blue Plz! Enjoy."

TotalHalibut was Bain's online name in PlanetSide: "I started off in the Halibuts which was our old guild from PlanetSide...that's where TotalHalibut comes from. Everyone who used to play in the Halibuts, Halibuts used to be a guild in PlanetSide that anyone could join, and, you basically, you made an alt to play in it and you had to have the word halibut in your name to play."

== Internet popularity ==
The main source of Bain's publicity was his primary YouTube channel, where he posted what he described as "variety gaming content" as part of the YouTube gaming network Polaris. His most popular videos belonged to his "WTF is...?" series, a series of first impressions on video games. He was described by Will Porter of Eurogamer as a "champion of indie gaming" and YouTube's foremost "love him or hate him" personality. The same critic suggested Bain's online popularity was due to his voice having a "tone of authority", while Bain himself believed that his candour and personality were key to his success. Prior to his death in May 2018, Bain had over 2.2 million subscribers to his YouTube channel.

After featuring the beta version of the game Space Pirates and Zombies (S.P.A.Z.) on "WTF is...?", Bain provided voice-over narration for the game. Andrew Hume of MinMax Games (the developer of S.P.A.Z.) credited Bain with bringing significant attention to their game.

TotalBiscuit was the top Steam curator for several years, with over 800,000 followers at the time of his death. Because of his popularity, Valve, which manages Steam, invited Bain and another gaming critic, James Stephanie Sterling, to their headquarters to help discuss how to improve the Steam's storefront and discovery tools in 2017.

Apart from his "WTF is...?" series, Bain hosted the "Content Patch" programme (started from 30 October 2012, ended 15 July 2016) in which he addressed gaming news and comments. Bain also hosted The Game Station Podcast and was a host of the Co-Optional Podcast, where he discussed games and gaming news with YouTube personalities Jesse Cox and Brooke "Dodger" Thorne along with a guest. It was live-streamed every Tuesday on his Twitch channel.

In 2016, Twitch added a LUL emoji, sketched from a photo of Bain laughing, which has since become one of the most popular emojis on Twitch. In the 2022 r/place social experiment project hosted on Reddit, a recreation of the LUL emoji was constructed in the middle of the canvas as a memorial for Bain.

== Consumer advocacy ==
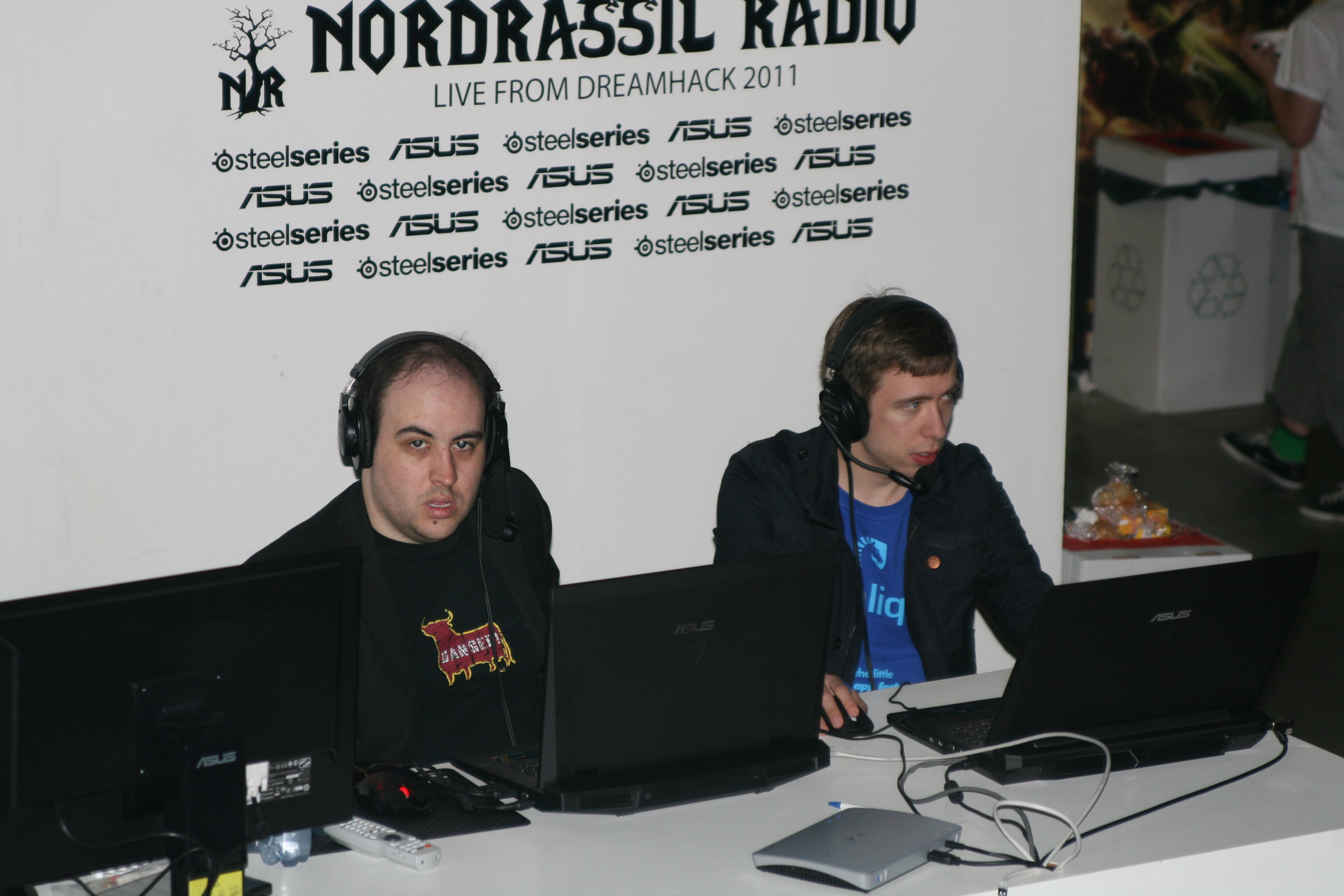
TotalBiscuit (left) in 2011

In October 2013, Wild Games Studio made a copyright claim against Bain's negative "WTF Is... ?" critique of their game Day One: Garry's Incident, which resulted in the video being taken down, despite having issued Bain with a review copy for the game, and use of copyrighted material for criticism being allowed under fair use. Bain's follow-up video responding to the takedown attracted press attention and leveled further criticism against Wild Games Studio, which resulted in the studio retracting its request.

In July 2014 an online debate about the ethics of YouTube gaming channels was sparked as a result of a survey revealing that some YouTube vloggers received monetary compensation from game developers or publishers in return for recording videos of their games. In response to this discussion, Bain announced on Twitter that he would "be clearly disclosing promotional videos in a splash screen at the start of the video". Disclaimers had previously appeared in the description fields of his videos, but Bain felt this was no longer good enough because YouTube videos that are embedded or that are displayed with certain apps omit that information.

Alongside his own Steam Curators channel, Bain founded the "Framerate Police" Curator group, intended to review games which reportedly had been locked to a 30 frames-per-second frame rate and determine if a higher frame rate was possible, as higher frame rate games typically look better and may be more responsive to player input. Bain said of the group's purpose "One of the biggest frustrations for people like that is when a game prevents them from getting the performance their hardware is capable of due to arbitrary limitations within the software itself and one of the most obvious and jarring that has such a big impact on how a game plays, is a 30 frames per second (or lower) lock."

In October 2014, whereas traditional video game review outlets were unable to obtain early access to the video game Middle-earth: Shadow of Mordor, Bain revealed that YouTube vloggers had been offered early access to the game in exchange for agreeing to a restrictive contract which required them to be positive about it. United States Federal Trade Commission rules require paid promotional deals on YouTube to be disclosed.

Bain became involved in Gamergate after discovering that a YouTube vlogger had received a notice under the US Digital Millennium Copyright Act for a video in which Zoë Quinn was discussed, arguing that removing the video would cause another instance of the Streisand effect. Bain subsequently discussed the ethical and professional concerns relevant to the video games press, and stated that he believed that many of the ethical concerns raised during the controversy were valid or deserved to be addressed. He stated that the harassment associated with Gamergate was the result of lone actors who wanted to provoke conflict among the people involved in the controversy. Bain interviewed Stephen Totilo of Kotaku about the Gamergate controversy in general, and specifically about Gamergate supporters' concerns with regard to Kotaku's ethics and professionalism.

On 3 April 2017 Gearbox Publishing announced a partnership with G2A for exclusive collector's editions of Bulletstorm: Full Clip Edition, to be created and sold by G2A. Bain was critical of this move, citing G2A's negative press coverage as well as accusations made against the company, and threatened to withhold covering Bulletstorm, or any other Gearbox game, unless Gearbox cancelled the deal. On 6 April 2017, one day before Bulletstorm: Full Clip Edition was due for release, Gearbox published a list of ultimatums made together with Bain for G2A to accept, or else it would back out of the deal. The ultimatums focused on G2A's Shield service, an open API for game developers, and G2A's payment system. The following day, Gearbox Publishing publicly announced that it was ending its co-operation with G2A, due to a lack of response from the company concerning the ultimatums. G2A responded to the assertions on 10 April 2017 stating, "All of the requests made of G2A.COM in the ultimatum have in fact long been part of our marketplace", and ascribed the problems to the unfamiliarities that Bain and Gearbox have in regard to how G2A operates its marketplace.

== Sponsorships ==
In February 2012 Bain announced that he would be sponsoring Team Dignitas player BlinG: "The StarCraft community has given a lot to me and in turn I've had the opportunity to give back with SHOUTcraft Invitational. Now it is time to take it one step further and directly support a UK talent that I believe has the potential to be one of the best foreigners in the world."

=== Team Axiom ===
In August 2012, Bain offered to sponsor CranK, formerly a member of team SlayerS, to compete in the MLG Pro Circuit 2012-Summer Championship.

On 26 September 2012 Bain and his wife, Genna, announced the creation of Team Axiom, with Bain and HuskyStarCraft as the team's sponsors and CranK, renamed to AxCrank at the time, as their first player. The group joined with Team Acer to form the team Axiom-Acer to participate in the GOMTV Global StarCraft II Team League. The Axiom roster consisted of AxCrank, AxAlicia, AxHeart and AxRyung.

On 15 October 2015 Bain announced the dissolution of Team Axiom because of the return of his cancer and a lack of recent success for the team.

== Awards ==
Bain was a runner-up in the Golden Joystick Awards 2012 in the category Greatest YouTube Gamer. He has been recognised on several prominent gaming sites including Technorati and Eurogamer. Bain won the 2012 Battle Royale organised by King of the Web and donated his winnings to the non-profit organisation Charity: Water. In 2014 he was an entrant in MCV's Brit List. TotalBiscuit has been nominated for a Shorty Award. On 5 December 2014 Bain received a Fan's Choice The Game Award in the category "Trending Gamer".

== Voice-over filmography ==
Year	Title	Role	Notes	Ref.
2011	Space Pirates and Zombies	Narrator		
