= Space Pirates and Zombies =

2011 video game

- Developer: MinMax Games
- Engine: Torque
- Platforms: Microsoft Windows, Linux, Mac OS X, OnLive
- Release: Microsoft Windows; August 15, 2011; Mac OS X July 12, 2012; Linux; September 18, 2012
- Genres: Real-time Strategy, RPG
- Mode: Single-player

Space Pirates and Zombies (S.P.A.Z.) is a real-time strategy video game released on August 15, 2011, on the Steam distribution platform. with a top-down perspective based around space combat. The game was developed by a two-man team under the studio MinMax Games using the Torque engine. The game was later ported for Mac OS X and Linux systems.

A sequel, Space Pirates and Zombies 2, was announced on February 5, 2014, and was set to be released in the 1st quarter of 2015, but it was delayed until 2016. Space Pirates and Zombies 2 has been in Early Access on Steam until its release on November 7, 2017.

== Gameplay ==
S.P.A.Z. integrates top down shooter gameplay with role-playing video game and real-time strategy elements within a futuristic space setting. The game also features large-scale randomly generated galaxies to explore. Players command a fleet of ships, and may control any one of their ships individually at a time. The galaxy is organized into systems, each system containing a star and a set of planet bodies and areas which may be "warped" to via an in-game map. These areas may contain faction stations where trade, missions, or sieges may take place. The player's standing with the faction affects what services the station will give you. Players can improve their faction standings through missions and level up their fleet through missions and combat.

When controlling the craft players can fire the craft's main weapons, fire alternative weapons such as missiles, or launch shuttlecraft filled with marines. The view of the game world can be scrolled in or out, enabling a distant view or a closer view for combat. Combat involves positioning your ship to hit the enemy with your weapons while dodging enemy fire, and tactically deploying larger weapons such as minefields and mass bombs. Each vessel has different shields, armor and hull types and each is strong or weak against certain types of weapon, encouraging players to diversify within their own fleets in order to engage different enemies. Initially gameplay involves interacting with the UTA or Civilian factions, depending on the player's standing with them in the current star system. Shortly into the game a faction of Bounty Hunters is introduced, and later in the game the eponymous and extremely dangerous zombie force appears.

Three types of resources are available in-game; Rez, Goons and Data. Rez is the material that is mined from asteroids and is used to build ships and buy technology. Goons are crew members found in ejected escape pods or bought from colony worlds, and are used to crew your ships and can be gifted to factions to improve relations. Data represents gathered technology and forms the basis for the game's experience system; the more the player destroys enemies and completes quests, the more Data is rewarded which can then be spent on upgrading the various aspects of the fleet.

There are currently 43 different types of controllable ships split into 5 size categories; Tiny, Small, Medium, Large and Huge. These can be fitted with a variety of weaponry such as lasers, cannons, torpedoes, guided missiles, mass bombs, fighter drones and mines whilst the ships themselves can be customised with different types of propulsion, reactors, shields, stealth technology and various utility boosters making them more effective in certain situations.

== Synopsis ==
Humanity has expanded throughout the galaxy after the discovery of the miraculous Element 126, colloquially known as 'Rez', which enabled matter replication technology (including cloning), advanced artificial intelligence and faster than light travel in the form of the warp gate network. With more of the new element found near the galactic core, the outer worlds, including Earth, have become neglected backwaters. With humanity now numbering in the thousands of trillions across thousands of planets, the spread of interplanetary diseases caused the collapse of many human governments. A totalitarian militaristic police force called the United Terran Alliance (or UTA) stepped in to fill the void and began to strictly police access to the warp gates. Civilian access to interstellar travel was abolished in what was described as a 'temporary move' but this state of affairs has existed for over 1000 years. With humanity living in the decaying remnants of its past glory the civilian populations of many sectors rose up against the UTA in the vicious 'Lockdown Wars' over control of space travel and the supply of Rez.

According to the game's lore, a hidden motherlode of Rez is believed to exist in the galactic core, although no one has found it. Miners and pirates in the Earth system unite to challenge the UTA in an attempt to locate it.

=== Plot ===
For years the Pirates of the Earth system, under the command of explorer Don Gibson, second-in-command Elsa Young and former UTA scientist Dr. Carl Memford, have been constructing a massive armed mothership named the Clockwork to take on the warring UTA and Civilian fleets between them and the galactic core. After allying with the Rez miners in the Earth system, the Clockwork crew blast their way through the UTA blockade at the system's warp gate and head into the wider galaxy. This brings them into conflict with the high ranking UTA commander Admiral Jamison who doggedly attempts to stop them reaching the heavily guarded Core Worlds.

After acquiring the technology necessary to access the Core Worlds the Clockwork crew discover that the Core Worlds are overrun with a horrific biomechanical pandemic that fuses living tissue into ship systems to create an all consuming hiveminded fleet of Zombies. It becomes apparent that the UTA had been battling this infection for over 200 years and the added security measures for accessing the Core Worlds were not to keep Civilians and Pirates out but to keep the Zombie infection in. The Clockwork battles on and eventually discovers a hidden alien warp gate into the galactic center - there it discovers an extremely ancient and hostile alien intelligence known as the 'Dark Entity' which is both the source of all Rez in the galaxy and the controlling intelligence of the Zombies.

To the horror of his crew, Captain Don Gibson immediately defects to the Dark Entity and the Clockwork is infected and transformed into a Zombie superweapon. The remaining crew are only saved by the intervention of Admiral Jamison, who then retreats in shock. Don reveals that he had encountered the Dark Entity over 200 years ago and was enslaved and dispatched as a means of securing the success of its infection by destroying the UTA's blockade on interstellar travel, with the Entity prolonging his lifespan in order to do so.

The Zombie infection quickly spreads throughout the entire galaxy, with the crew of the Clockwork becoming widely hated and cursed for bringing about the apparent end of humanity. Seeking to save the galaxy, and to get revenge on Gibson, Elsa Young takes command of the Pirates and spends the next 2 years creating a new mothership - Clockwork 2. With the help of Admiral Jamison and other allies, the Pirate fleet fights its way back through Zombie space to the realm of the Dark Entity and destroys it, Gibson and the original Clockwork.

The fate of humanity is left in question, as the Rez it so desperately depended on can now no longer be replenished. Choosing not to dwell on this the Pirates instead devote themselves to destroying every trace of the Zombie infection.

== Development ==
The game was developed by Andrew Hume and Richard Clifford, who had previously shared an office for five years as technical designers at Radical Entertainment in British Columbia, Canada. They were working on the unreleased Scarface 2, the sequel to Scarface: The World Is Yours, for two years before the project was cancelled. Following this the pair worked on an undisclosed project for a year, before this too was canceled. On this Clifford stated "Having years of your life flushed because of a graph projection and watching 60 of your friends get laid off can destroy the magic feeling." Soon after the second project's cancellation they shared their ideas for a debut video game of their own making, whereupon they left Radical Entertainment and formed MinMax Games.

Taking on development of S.P.A.Z. required a full-time commitment from both men. As a result of this, neither received any kind of payment for a period of twenty two months. The project was initially planned to take six months. The self-funding nature of the project eventually required the developers to use the equity of their homes in order to continue. The development of a game through a two-man independent studio as opposed to being part of a much larger team offered both positive and negative changes. Because Hume and Clifford lacked the staff resources of a larger company they were forced to take on tasks which would have been handled by a more specialist staff member should they still been employed at Radical Entertainment. Decision making, however, required short conversations and agreements rather than meetings and risk assessments, simplifying this facet of development.

S.P.A.Z. was modeled on video games from what the developers consider "the golden age of gaming", including series such as X-com, Star Control and Mechwarrior, but given "a modern twist". Various aspects of these titles and others were combined to form S.P.A.Z. The top-down perspective space combat aspect was influenced by Star Control, the physics and emphasis on craft design from Mechwarrior was added to this to form the base of the game. The components for spacecraft, it was decided, would need to be unlocked during play. The role-playing game style skill tree of Diablo was combined with the tiered research system of X-com to produce the required effect. The science fiction television series Babylon 5 was the inspiration behind the thruster-based space combat. The in-game universe was inspired by the exploration aspects of Freelancer and Homeworld, producing "a top down space action RPG" similar to a simplified descendant of Escape Velocity. The game features narration, with John "TotalBiscuit" Bain providing voice-over. In a June 2011 interview with Indie Games Channel, Hume credited Bain for bringing a significant amount of attention to S.P.A.Z. after he reviewed the beta version of the game on his YouTube channel. Bain later offered to voice the games narrator, which they "fell all over [themselves] to accept".

The game's universe was originally designed to accommodate several different races, however after several months the developers had not progressed far beyond humans. At this point it was decided to retain "the zombified ship aspect" and refocus on that. A plant-based race and a crystalline race were dropped from the game. The zombies' organic weapons proved difficult to define, ideas such as egg-laying and infestation from creatures entering the players' ships were considered. The developers decided to produce "zombified versions" of each human-controlled ship within the game, resulting in the final design of the zombies. The zombies' reproduction was inspired by spiders, some of which "reproduce and have their offspring crawling all over them". The developers incorporated this, allowing zombie ships to effectively reproduce by infecting the players' craft similar to Homeworld: Cataclysm's antagonist.

The spacecraft were originally created by Clifford combining shapes then drawing over the top of the resultant silhouette. Due to his lack of artistic training a lot of the designs "looked bad at first". After repeated attempts the craft started to improve visually, resulting in a collection of ships with different areas to deploy weapons. These areas, hard points, were adjusted throughout development. It was decided that each craft should perform a specific role within each size class, additional craft were created to fill any gaps. Weapons from Babylon 5 and Star Trek were added to the game, whenever the team saw examples which were not emulated within the game they attempted to create them. The randomly generated galaxies were not originally intended. After a time the developers discovered that creating the game's world was too time-consuming. Although the creation of the procedurally generated galaxy aspect took time in itself, once it was completed it grew along with the rest of the project. Balancing the randomly generated galaxies would have proven difficult, but because S.P.A.Z. is an open-world game it allows players to choose which tasks to undertake during play.

== Reception ==
Space Pirates and Zombies received both positive and mixed reviews and previews from video game critics, covering both the beta version of the game and the final release. In a preview by Jeff Mattas of Shacknews, he stated "I have no reservations recommending that anyone looking for a solid space-based shooter with retro flair, a ton of customization options, and a lot of replay value." In another preview, by Quintin Smith of Rock, Paper, Shotgun, the author stated "While this is a good game and well worth your attention (and when it emerges from the beta, it might even be a great one), oh my Lord is it irritating." Smith also stated "I think a lot of modern PC gamers would cheer at any dev trying to breathe life into the frozen body of the space shooter genre", but added "S.P.A.Z. isn't simply resuscitating a genre. It's also following quite an old-fashioned and miserly approach to learning curves and content."

Atomic Gamer's Jeff Buckland gave the game an overall rating of 9 of 10. He stated "while a lot of changes have gone into v1.0, I'd still be recommending the game even without them." In regards to the update he added "We get quite a few new accessibility and convenience features, more missions, a specialist system, and more - along with some bug fixes, many addressing specific issues that I and many players had in the beta." He summed up by recommending the game to "serious fans of games like Master of Orion, Star Control 2, Space Rangers 2, or other space-based, genre-bending games". GamePro's Tony Capri gave an overall rating of 7 of 10, stating "The combat is fun, the controls are solid, and there's ample content -- unfortunately, SPAZ is not actually as expansive as its premise suggests." He also stated "There's plenty of content already under the hood, and MinMax is intent on offering a steady stream of meaningful updates. Unfortunately, the game at present doesn't fully satisfy in terms of presentation or variety".

== See also ==
- SubSpace (1997)
- Infantry (1999)
- Flatspace (2003)
- Starscape (2004)
- Endless Sky (2015)
