= World Cyber Games 2001 =

The World Cyber Games 2001 was held in Seoul, South Korea from the December 5th to the 9th. Total prize money was $300,000.

== Official games ==
- First-person shooter (FPS)
  - Half-Life: Counter-Strike
  - Quake III: Arena
  - Unreal Tournament
- Real-Time Strategy (RTS)
  - Age of Empires II: The Conquerors
  - StarCraft: Brood War
- Sport
  - FIFA 2001

== Results ==
Event	Gold		Silver		Bronze	
Age of Empires II	(Taiwan) Jeng-Cheng Tseng (IamKmkm)		(South Korea) Byung-Geon Kang (iamgrunt)		(Hong Kong) Chun-Yu Shing (chun_yu)	
Half-Life: Counter-Strike	[:LnD:] (Canada)	Clement Chapados-Girard	[mTw] (Germany)	Jens Heyenga	All-Stars (Finland)	Mika Kanervisto
Half-Life: Counter-Strike	[:LnD:] (Canada)	Steeve Foster	[mTw] (Germany)	Kai Hering	All-Stars (Finland)	Antti Larte
Half-Life: Counter-Strike	[:LnD:] (Canada)	Harlem Ahua	[mTw] (Germany)	Konsta Tiihonen	All-Stars (Finland)	Joona Leppanen
Half-Life: Counter-Strike	[:LnD:] (Canada)	Simon Quirion	[mTw] (Germany)	Markus Schmied	All-Stars (Finland)	Betro Hakala
Half-Life: Counter-Strike	[:LnD:] (Canada)	Ognian Gueorguiev	[mTw] (Germany)	Philipp Mohr	All-Stars (Finland)	Aki Peltoniemi
FIFA 2001	(South Korea) Doo-Hyung Kim (Jaguar)		(Italy) Francesco Di Dio (Champion)		(China) Zheng Wei (ZW)	
Starcraft: Brood War	(South Korea) Yo-Hwan Lim (BoxeR)		(France) Bertrand Grospellier (ElkY)		(South Korea) Tae-Min Park (GoRush)	
Unreal Tournament	(Germany) Christian Hock (GitzZz)		(United States) Jeremy Evans (XS Pain)		(South Korea) Sung-Woo Kim (SLXC Xan)	
Quake III: Arena	(United States) John Hill (Zero4)		(Russia) Alexei Nesterov (Lexer)		(Germany) Stephan Lammert (SK.Stelam)	
