= Hong Jin-ho =

South Korean television personality and esports player

YellOw
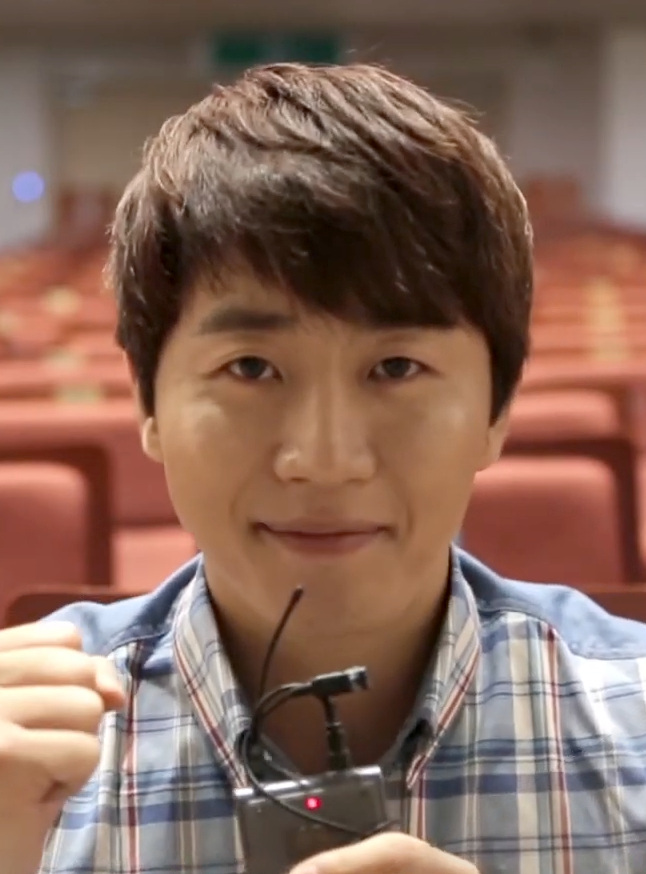
- Hong in 2014

Personal information
- Name: Hong Jin-ho
- Nickname(s): Storm Zerg, Kong Jin-ho
- Nationality: South Korean

Career information
- Games: StarCraft
- Playing career: 2000–2011
- Role: Zerg

Team history
- 2000–2002: Gamei
- 2002: Ideal Space
- 2002–2003: KTF MagicNs
- 2003–2004: Toona S.G
- 2004–2008: KTF MagicNs
- 2009–2010: Air Force ACE
- 2010–2011: KT Rolster

Korean name
- Hangul: 홍진호
- Hanja: 洪榛浩
- RR: Hong Jinho
- MR: Hong Chinho

Hong Jin-ho (Korean: 홍진호; born 31 October 1982) is a South Korean television personality, poker player, and former professional StarCraft player who plays under the alias [NC]...YellOw or simply YellOw. In 2012, he became the coach of the Xenics Storm League of Legends pro gaming team. As a television personality, he is most known for his appearances in the reality survival show The Genius and the variety show Crime Scene.

== StarCraft career ==
Hong, nicknamed the "Storm Zerg" and "Kong (means bean in Korean) Jin-ho", is known for his aggressive and harass-style play, and for his rivalry with BoxeR.

He is famous for never having won first place in major StarCraft tournaments despite his strong performances. Hong managed to finish second place six times in events which earned him the title "King of Silver". While there are some tournaments in which he finished first, these records were invalidated when the KeSPA announced that it would accept only OnGameNet Starleague (OSL) and MSL records. His notable victories include first place in the 2003 ITV 5th Starleague, the Snickers All-Star league in 2005, and the first BlizzCon invitational tournament.

Hong suffered his last major defeat against Han "Casy" Dong-wook in the semi-finals of the Shinhan Bank Season 1 OSL in 2006, and claimed 3rd place. Due to his poor performance in the following OSL, Hong has fallen into a slump from which he has not recovered. Hong reached the round of 32 in the GOMTV Averatech Classic, but was eliminated by oDin (Joo Young-dal). He enlisted in the Korean Air Force in November 2008 in the StarCraft team Air Force ACE.

After being a member of ROKAF ACE, Hong recovered his form slowly but steadily. The trigger was an old-fashioned 'storm-like' victory against Bisu[Shield] on 20 June 2009 in the Shinhan Bank ProLeague 08–09, after 735 days of silence. He could not qualify for either OSL nor MSL since the Shinhan Bank OSL season 2 in 2006, but at the end of Shinhan Bank ProLeague 09–10 season, Hong ended the season securing a 3-game winning streak, including a dramatic victory against Jaedong.

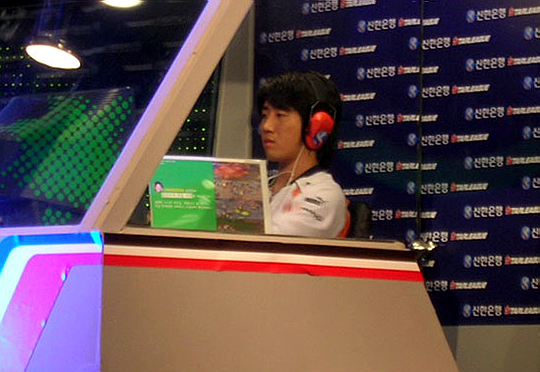
Hong during the second season of the Shinhan Bank StarLeague

Hong officially announced his retirement from professional gaming on his website on 16 June 2011. At his retirement ceremony, BoxeR jokingly handed him an empty StarCraft 2 box. BoxeR said that the box was empty, but the account was at the SlayerS clan house, and if Hong ever considered transitioning into StarCraft 2, he knew where to go.

In August 2011, he appeared on a reality TV series entitled Project A on GOMtv. The series follows Hong as he attempts to qualify for the GOMTV Global StarCraft II League and relaunch his pro gaming career in StarCraft 2. The series premiered on 12 August 2011.

== Post-retirement ==
On 16 June 2011, Hong announced his retirement from his StarCraft career.

In 2012, he became the head coach of the Xenics Storm League of Legends pro gaming team.

In 2013, he was cast along with eleven contestants in the first season of the Korean reality television game show, The Genius: Rules of the Game. The series debuted on tvN starting on 26 April 2013. It featured weekly game challenges involving team politics and individual tactical play. Hong quickly became a fan favourite as he demonstrated his mental fortitude in strategic game play. He finished the series as the final champion, beating out other participants including celebrities, Harvard graduate and politician Lee Jun Seok, Mensa member Choi Jung Moon, and legendary pro gambler Jimmy Cha. The prize money was KRW 79,000,000 (approx. USD 70,000). With this achievement, he received positive comments that he had enhanced the image of pro gamers, not to speak of his own recognition as a genius.

In November 2013, the second season of the programme, which was named The Genius: Rule Breaker, began broadcasting. Hong was recast as a returning contestant, along with Lim Yo-Hwan (SlayerS_`BoxeR'), his longtime StarCraft rival. He was eliminated in Episode 7. He was eventually invited as a guest to appear on a new spin-off programme Genius Behind. This programme focuses on analyzing the episode that transpired in the previous week, and is meant as a lead-up to the airing of each new episode.

In 2014, Hong appeared on popular TV programmes such as Radio Star and I Live Alone on MBC TV; Happy Together on KBS 2TV; and was recruited as a cast member of Crime Scene on JTBC.

He also collaborated with other veteran StarCraft players to organise tournaments featuring former pro gamers, with the eventual goal of setting up a league for veteran StarCraft players and reviving the fortunes of StarCraft. The first activity was the inaugural "Star Final Four" event match held on 5 February 2014. Hong competed with Kang Min (Nal_rA), Park Jun-Suk (Reach) and Lee Byung-Min (GoodFriend). He eventually won the event.

Hong came out of retirement after he was one of eight players invited to the GOMtv classic in February 2014, one of the first televised Brood War tournaments in years.

In 2015, Hong returned for the fourth season of The Genius entitled The Genius : Grand Final and the second season of Crime Scene, getting 4th on The Genius: Grand Final and 1st on Crime Scene 2.

=== Poker ===
Hong has recently made a successful transition to professional poker, even though he has been playing online poker since the 2000s, especially on PokerStars.

He is currently sponsored by the online Japanese Brand J88Poker.

He has won major Asian tournaments such as Asian Poker Tour Championships Event in Taiwan and the J88Poker Tour Shanghai Main Event.

In 2022, Hong won his first WSOP bracelet in the $1,979 Poker Hall of Fame Bounty No-Limit Hold'em event, winning $276,067.

== Personal life ==
On 25 May 2023, Hong announced his upcoming marriage to his girlfriend. On 17 March 2024, Hong married his girlfriend, who is 10 years younger than him, in Gangnam. On 16 November 2024, Hong announced the birth of his first child, a daughter.

== Major achievements ==
Title	Notes
World Cyber Games 2002 Grand Final	Runner-up
BlizzCon 2005	First place
KTEC KPGA Winner's Championship	First place
2005 Snickers All-Star League	First place
TG Sambo MSL	Runner-up
KPGA 1st Tour (MSL)	Runner-up
KPGA 2nd Tour (MSL)	Runner-up
Olympus OnGameNet Starleague	Runner-up
Coca-Cola OnGameNet Star League	Runner-up

== Television appearances ==
Year	Title	Notes
2013	The Genius: Rules of the Game	Winner
2013	The Genius: Rule Breaker	Cast member (Episode 1–7)
2014	Kim Jiyeon's Sweet 19	Cast member
2014	Shared TV	Cast member
2014	Need More Romance	Cast member
2014	Crime Scene	Cast member
2014	First Day of Work Season 2	Cast member
2014	I Live Alone	Guest (Episode 43)
2014	Radio Star	Guest (Episode 369)
2014	Happy Together	Guest (Episode 344 & 361)
2014	The Genius: Black Garnet	Guest (Episode 10)
2014	Please Take Care of My Refrigerator	Guest (Episode 5 & 6)
2015	Crime Scene 2	Cast member
2015	The Genius: Grand Final	Cast member
2015	Off to School	Guest (Episode 59–62)
2015	Problematic Men	Guest (Episode 30)
2015	Non-Summit	Guest (Episode 37)
2015	5 Days of Summer (Prague)	with Lady Jane
2016	Knowing Bros	Guest (Episode 8)
2016–2017	Game Show	MC
2017	Crime Scene 3	Cast member (Episode 8 onwards)
2018	Radio Star	Guest (Episode 563)
2019	King of Mask Singer	Contestant (TMI) (Episode 193)
2021	Still Alive	Main Cast Chuseok pilot

=== Web shows ===
Year	Title	Role	Ref.
2023	The Time Hotel	Contestant	
2023	Bloody Game Season 2	Contestant	
2024	Bloody Game Season 3	Contestant	
2026	Bloody Game X	Contestant	

== See also ==
- StarCraft professional competition
