= The Time Hotel =

South Korean reality survival show

- Promotional poster
- 더 타임 호텔
- Genre: Reality; Survival
- Directed by: Nam Kyung-mo
- Country of origin: South Korea
- Original language: Korean
- No. of seasons: 1
- No. of episodes: 10

Production
- Running time: 65–122 minutes
- Production company: CJ ENM

Original release
- Network: TVING
- Release: April 12 – May 16, 2023

The Time Hotel (Korean: 더 타임 호텔), also known as Time is Money, is a South Korean reality survival show that aired on TVING from its premiere on April 1 to May 16, 2023.

== Overview ==
The show is based in a hotel where ten contestants buy amenities with time instead of money, and contestants are "checked out" when they run out of time. Contestants compete in a variety of games to earn as much time as possible, forming impromptu teams and enemies alike.

The last contestant remaining wins the grand prize of ₩300 million.

== Cast ==
- Hong Jin-ho, a television personality, professional poker player, and former StarCraft player who is known for being in the reality game show The Genius: Rules of the Game
- Hwang Je-sung, a comedian and actor known for his appearance on variety show Running Man
- John Park, a Korean-American singer, competed on American Idol and Superstar K2
- CHLOE, a singer and dancer in the girl group cignature
- Joo Eon-gyu, an online content creator specializing in finance
- Monika Shin, a dancer, model, and businesswoman
- Layone, a rapper, placed 3rd place in Show Me the Money 9
- Shin Ji-yeon, known for her appearance on the dating show Single's Inferno
- Kim Nam-hee, a television announcer
- Kim Hyun-kyu, an actor

== Elimination history ==
	Day eliminated										
Contestant	Day 1	Day 2	Day 3	Day 4	Day 5	Day 6	Day 7 (part 1)	Day 7 (part 2)	Day 8	Runner-up	Winner
Monika Shin	Eliminated										
Kim Nam-hee	Safe	Eliminated									
Layone	Safe		Eliminated								
Shin Ji-yeon	Safe			Eliminated							
Joo Eon-gyu	Safe					Eliminated					
CHLOE	Safe						Eliminated				
Kim Hyun-gu	Safe							Eliminated			
Hwang Je-sung	Safe								Eliminated		
Hong Jin-ho	Safe									Runner-up	
John Park	Safe										Won

== Episodes ==
The Time Hotel episodes
No.	Title	Original release date
1	"Episode 1"	April 12, 2023
2	"Episode 2"	April 12, 2023
3	"Episode 3"	April 12, 2023
4	"Episode 4"	April 12, 2023
5	"Episode 5"	April 19, 2023
6	"Episode 6"	April 19, 2023
7	"Episode 7"	April 26, 2023
8	"Episode 8"	May 3, 2023
9	"Episode 9"	May 10, 2023
10	"Episode 10"	May 17, 2023

== Production ==
The Time Hotel had its cast confirmed and began filming in December 2022.

== Controversy ==
The show was slated to air in March 2023, but was delayed to April due to a plagiarism incident with Joo Eon-gyu over his YouTube videos.
