= NesTea =

South Korean video game player

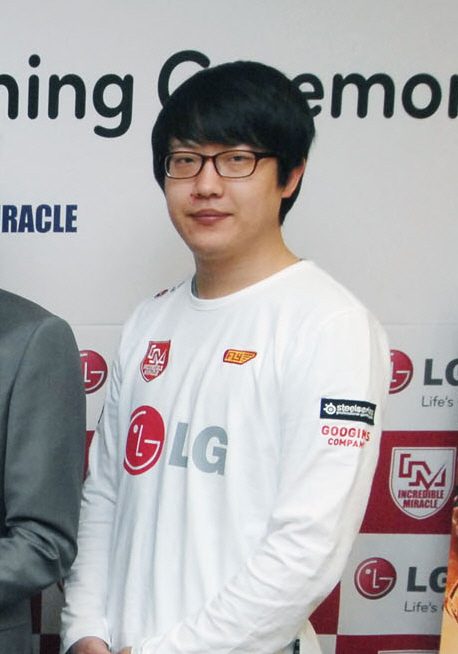
- Lim at LG-IM Sponsorship Signing Ceremony in 2012

Personal information
- Name: 임재덕 (Lim Jae-Duk)
- Nationality: South Korean

Career information
- Games: StarCraft: Brood War; StarCraft II: Wings of Liberty; StarCraft II: Heart of the Swarm
- Playing career: 2006–2014

Team history
- 2006–2010: KT Rolster
- 2010–2014: Incredible Miracle

Career highlights and awards
- 3× GSL champion

Lim Jae-Duk (Korean: 임재덕), known by the pseudonym of NesTea, is one of the most successful players of the real-time strategy game StarCraft II: Wings of Liberty. He has won $246,963 in tournament winnings over the course of his StarCraft 2 career, and has won three GOMTV Global Starcraft II League (GSL) tournaments, the third-most of any player, just behind teammate Jung "Mvp" Jong Hyun who has four titles as well as Maru who has recently won his seventh title.

== History ==
=== 2010 ===
NesTea was one of the top ranked Zerg players on the Korean ladder shortly after the launch of StarCraft II: Wings of Liberty. He managed to qualify for the very first GOMTV Global Starcraft II League, but his tournament run met a quick end when he was eliminated in the first round by LiveForever. His opponent finished in third/fourth place. In late September 2010, NesTea, together with Mvp, TT, ChRh, and LosirA, founded the team IM - "Incredible Miracle". All of these team members were former Brood War players.

However, in season 2 of the GOMTV Global Starcraft II League he went much further in the tournament than his previous run. He did not drop a single set until the final's; a record that was only broken by himself in a later season where he won the tournament without dropping a single map. He ended up winning season 2 by defeating Boxer (who changed his name to Marineking) 4–3.

=== 2011 ===
NesTea kept up with his impressive performance when his team Incredible Miracle reached the finals of GOMTV Global Starcraft II Team League. They were up against Startale and were tied 4–4 in the best of seven, NesTea was chosen for the ace match and won his game carrying his team to the first ever GSTL win.

When Code S and Code A were introduced into the GSL it was a rocky start for NesTea. Losing to MVP in the semifinals of the first Code S and then being taken down to the up and down matches (this is used to determine how moves up and down between Code A and Code S) in the second season of the new GSL. He however bounced back getting right back into Code S.

In May he advanced from his group only losing one game and proceeded to reach the finals of the GSL once again. He met InCa in the finals and easily took the game 4–0 to claim yet another GSL win.

In July NesTea beat the record that he had set for the cleanest tournament by not losing a single game in the whole tournaments and taking the finals 4–0. This record has never been met again by anyone including NesTea.

In August, NesTea beat Kyrix in the group stages and lost against MMA, which ended NesTea's massive GSL win streak. He advanced from his group to the Round of 16 by winning a close match against his teammate Happy. Unfortunately, his next opponent was once again his teammate and rival, Mvp, whom he lost to 0–2.

In October, NesTea was once again in a group with MMA. However, this time, NesTea managed to advance through his group by defeating both MMA and NaDa. He then defeated Virus 2–1 in the Round of 16, but lost in the Round of 8 to Mvp in a close (2-3) series.

NesTea struggled a bit during the initial stages of the 2011 GSL November. He was able to advance from the Round of 32 by defeating his teammate LosirA, but then lost 0–2 in the Round of 16, sending him into Code A.

In the 2012 GSL Season 1 Code S Round of 32, NesTea was seeded into a group with Mvp, Lucky, and IdrA. He defeated IdrA 2-0 and Mvp 2–1 to continue into the Round of 16. NesTea would lose 2–1 against both DongRaeGu and Genius to fall down to Code A as last in his group.

NesTea was briefly in Code A, he played one game against asd and beat him 2-0 reclaiming his Code S spot.

NesTea was invited to his first major foreign tournament when he was invited to BlizzCon 2011. He reached the finals where he had to verse he teammate MVP in an extended series due to the fact that he had beat him in the winners bracket prior to the finals. He lost two best of 3's to MVP leaving him in second place. After BlizzCon 2011 NesTea went to MLG Providence. He ended up in 12th place losing to Haypro and NaNiwa. His lose to NaNiwa created a new rivalry between the 2 players that would come back often in events in and out of Korea.

=== 2012 ===
In 2012 NesTea participated in many foreign tournaments and achieved high rankings in these tournaments. He participated in the Iron Squid tournament, a tournament hosted in Paris, France. He went to the US for the IGN Pro League and for the 2012 MLG Winter Qualifier Korea.

When he participated in the Iron Squid tournament he was in group D with aLive, Nerchio, Leenock and HasuObs. He advanced from his group without dropping a set and proceeded to the open bracket. He went up against Jjakji in the quarterfinals and beat him 3–2 in the best of 5. He then lost to Symbol 3–1 in the semifinals dropping him down to the third place decider match where he would face aLive. He defeated aLive 3–2 to claim third place in the tournament and claiming $3,750.

=== 2014 ===
In 2014 NesTea became a free agent.

== Trivia ==
- He is the first player to win three GSL championships.
- He is the first and only player to win a GSL without dropping a single game. (July 2011). The only player who has ever come close to achieving such a feat is his teammate Mvp, who only lost a single game in GSL January 2011—to NesTea himself.
- From GSL May to GSL August he had a 19-game win streak
- First player to win 2 GSL Code S tournaments consecutively
- He has won the GSL finals against every race. He won GSL Open S2 against MarineKing (Terran), GSL May against InCa (Protoss), and GSL July against teammate LosirA (Zerg).
- He chose the ID NesTea because there was a Nestea bottle on his desk when he was making his StarCraft 2 account. Bong is a censored word on Blizzard's Battle.Net 2.0, so he could not use his original ID, 'ZergBong.'
- He has only been eliminated from Code S single elimination bracket stages by his teammate Mvp.
- He is the first player to qualify for GSL Code S ten consecutive seasons, earning the "NesTea Award" named in his honor.
