= INcontroL =

American StarCraft player and commentator (1985–2019)

iNcontroL
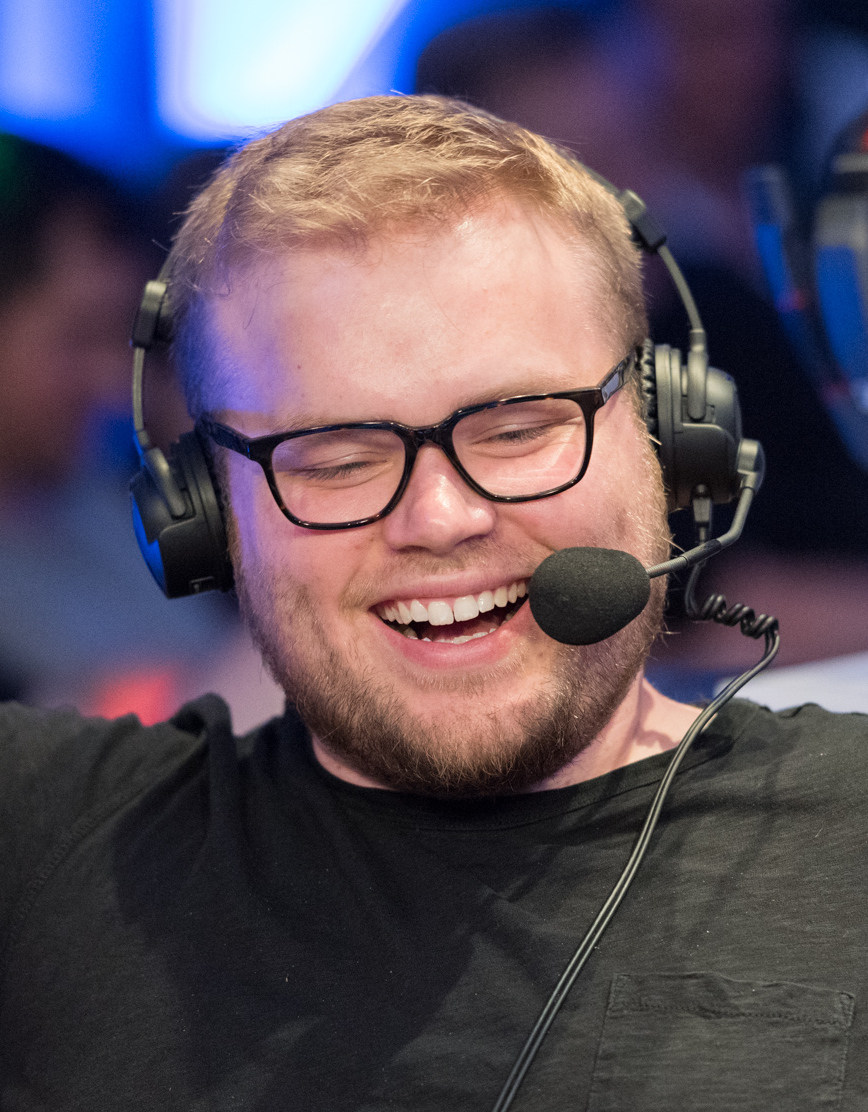
- Robinson in 2017

Personal information
- Name: Geoff Robinson
- Born: September 11, 1985; Spokane, Washington, US
- Died: July 20, 2019 (aged 33); Emeryville, California, US

Career information
- Game: StarCraft
- Playing career: 1998–2015
- Casting career: 2010–2019

Team history
- 2009–2017: Evil Geniuses

Geoffrey John Vincent Robinson (September 11, 1985 – July 20, 2019), better known as iNcontroL, was an American professional StarCraft player, coach, and commentator. As a player, his first major tournament win came in 2007, when he finished first at the World Cyber Games 2007 USA qualifiers in the StarCraft: Brood War event. He was signed to the esports organization Evil Geniuses in 2009, where he competed as a part of their StarCraft II division. As his career progressed, Robinson transitioned from primarily being a player to primarily being a commentator. He hosted and commentated several major StarCraft II events from 2010 to 2019, including the StarCraft II World Championship Series. He also ran several podcast series throughout his career.

Robinson had been hospitalized multiple times due to blood clots. The first one occurred in 2013, when he developed deep vein thrombosis. In 2019, he died due to a pulmonary embolism.

== Career ==
Robinson began playing StarCraft: Brood War as early as 1998, at age 14, when he started his own professional StarCraft team. In 2007, he won the World Cyber Games 2007 USA qualifiers. He was also a contestant on the first season of the Syfy reality show WCG Ultimate Gamer in 2009.

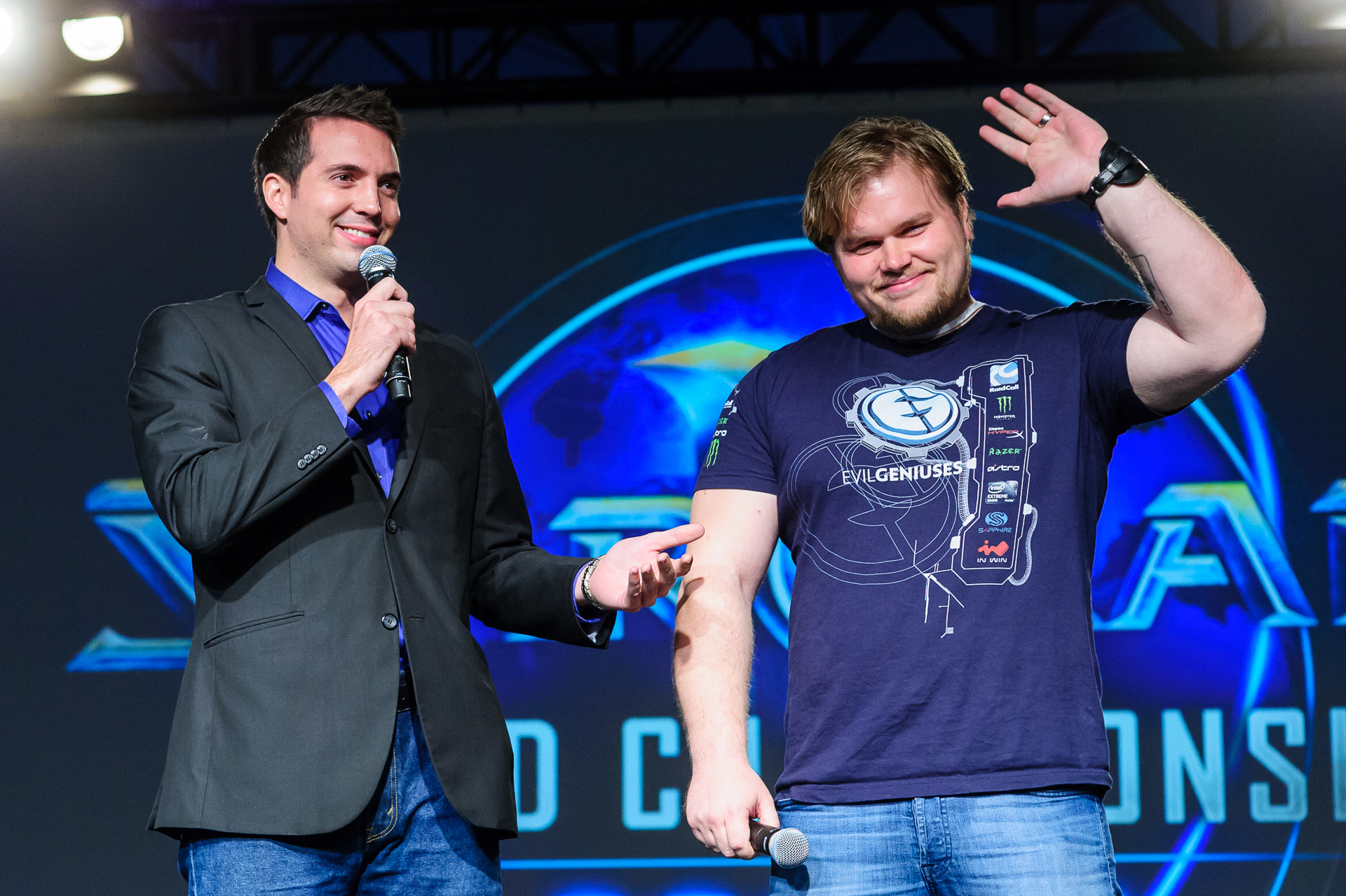
Robinson (right) at 2013 WCS Season 3

That same year, Robinson joined the esports organization Evil Geniuses, in anticipation of Blizzard Entertainment's upcoming sequel StarCraft II. He was initially paid a salary of US$200 per month, along with paid travel and free equipment. By 2010, Robinson and some of his Evil Geniuses teammates founded GosuCoaching, a dedicated coaching website, where the majority of his income came from. He would also cast StarCraft events and worked on the State of the Game podcast. In an interview, he noted that while he enjoyed the community aspect of the game, he was "a competitor first and foremost." His Evil Geniuses salary increased to at least $3,000 per month by 2011.

Robinson's best professional result came in 2011, after finishing in the top four at MLG Dallas 2011. However, he did not find much success playing in tournaments afterwards, due in part to large tournament organizers, such as GOMTV and MLG, allowing professional South Korean players to compete in the United States. Later in 2011, Robinson competed and commented in the first season of the North American Star League (NASL).

By mid-2012, Robinson started hosting and casting live events more regularly, and while he worked primarily as a host and analyst thereafter, he still played in a few major StarCraft II events, including MLG and the HomeStory Cup. He left Evil Geniuses in January 2017, after the organization dropped its entire StarCraft II division. Afterwards, Robinson worked in the StarCraft scene independently, continuing to cast numerous StarCraft II tournaments. He also created a weekly StarCraft II podcast called The Pylon Show with Daniel Ray "Artosis" Stemkoski and Matt "CobraVe7nom7" Land. Robinson's last event he worked in was the 2019 WCS North America and Europe qualifiers.

== Personal life ==
Robinson was born on September 11, 1985, in Spokane, Washington, and grew up in the greater Seattle area. He went to high school O'Dea High School, where he was the captain of the football team and was also part of the baseball, chess, and debate teams. Robinson attended college at Oregon State University (OSU) and graduated with a degree in English, with the intentions of becoming an English teacher at his former high school. He met his future wife Anna Prosser during his time at OSU. He and Prosser married in 2012, although they separated six years later.

Robinson was a physically active person, going to the gym three hours a day, competing in professional weightlifting events, and being able to bench over 500 pounds in around 2010. Although an active person, Robinson was hospitalized several times. In 2013, he was hospitalized due to a blood clot in his knee, otherwise known as deep vein thrombosis. In June 2019, Robinson was hospitalized due to a "large abscess infected over [his] femoral artery," although he said that the infection looked like it was healing later that month. The following month, on July 20, 2019, Robinson died at his home in Emeryville, California, due to a pulmonary embolism. His death was publicly announced on his Twitter account the following day. His wife remembered him as a person who, "exemplified what it was to be a good man. A world without him is wanting, but profoundly blessed to have had him."

== Legacy ==
Robinson was regarded as one of the faces of StarCraft esports and one of the most influential people in the professional StarCraft scene. Following his death, StarCraft community Platinum Heroes hosted a memorial tournament, with all donations going to the Southern California Bulldog Rescue. On October 22, 2019, Blizzard added a free commemorative StarCraft II bundle, in honor of Robinson.
