= North American Star League =

- Sport: StarCraft II, Heroes of Newerth, Tribes: Ascend
- Founded: 2011, in California, USA
- CEO: C. Russell Pfister
- COO: Mark K. Brown
- Motto: We <3 eSports
- Website: nasl.tv

The North American Star League was a professional e-sports league that features the games StarCraft II and Heroes of Newerth. Originally modeled after successful South Korean professional StarCraft leagues, it was founded in 2011 by Russell Pfister and Duncan Stewart. Following the mid-year departure of Stewart, Mark K. Brown was tapped to fill the position of Chief Operating Officer in August 2011, and held that position until late-2014.

== Origins ==
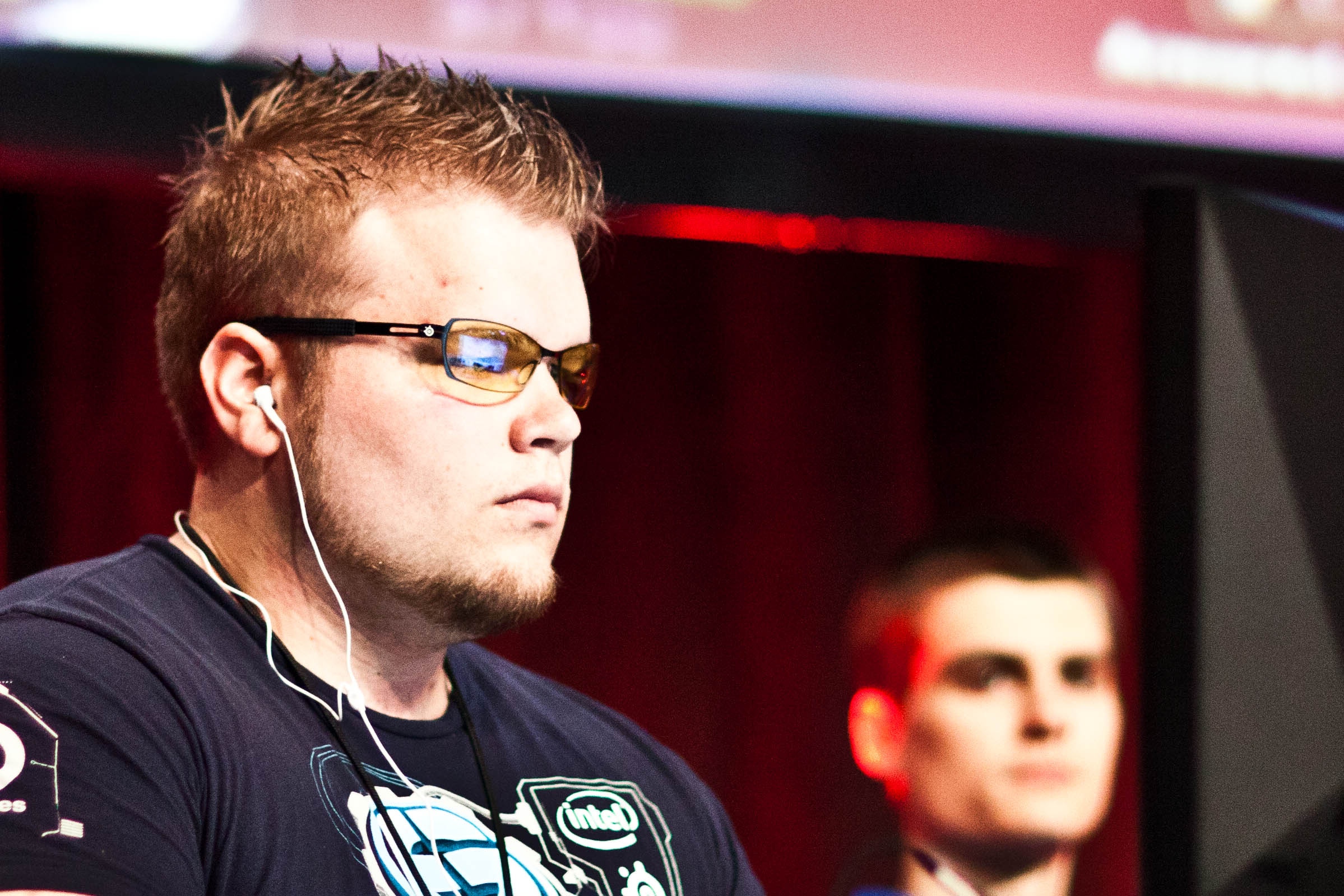
Geoff "iNcontroL" Robinson playing at MLG Dallas 2011.

Professional-level competition in StarCraft was originally a South Korean phenomenon that began in the early 2000s (decade). Leagues such as Starleague and GOMTV offered 24-hour television coverage and live competitions held in arena venues. However, until the formation of the NASL, North American StarCraft competitions were limited to one-off events hosted by Major League Gaming and smaller gaming associations.

The NASL was developed by Russell Pfister, owner of the video-game coaching website Gosucoaching. The source of the funding for the start-up's first season and first season's finals event prize pool were not revealed. Before the start of the NASL's season two in September 2011, multiple season sponsors were secured and announced by C.O.O. Mark K. Brown, including Eizo Nanao Technologies, Kingston HyperX, and iBUYPOWER, Although StarCraft games are one-on-one, head-to-head matches, players are typically sponsored and represented by teams.

== Season 1 ==
In its first season, the league was made up of 50 StarCraft players divided into 5 divisions. Divisional matches were played weeknights for a nine-week period. Then, in a week-long open invitational tournament, 1000 players competed for a single berth in the league finals. The finals consisted of a sixteen-person play-off with the tournament winner receiving $50,000 US out of a total $100,000 US, a record prize pool amount at the time.

The North American Star League's broadcast debut was made on April 5, 2011. After nine weeks of play and a playoff bracket, along with an open qualifier tournament, the Grand Finals of the first season took place July 8–10, 2011 in Ontario, California. In a best of seven series, South Korean player Puma, who clinched the final spot out of the open bracket for the Grand Finals, defeated fellow Korean MC 4-3 and walked away with $50,000 in prize money.

== Season 2 ==
Season 2 of the North American Star League consisted of 40 StarCraft players divided into 4 divisions. The season also included a Heroes of Newerth team-based competition. The finals were held on December 2 through 4, 2011 at the Ontario Convention Center in Ontario, California.

The North American Star League started broadcasting Season two on September 14, 2011. Some major changes to the format from season one involved the number of players being reduced from 50 to 40. The main season lasted 8 weeks leading up to the Grand Finals. The top two finishers in each division were seeded into the main bracket. From the remaining players, the top 20 will be placed in five qualifier brackets. The winners of each qualifier bracket will be placed into the main bracket. The last spot goes to the winner of the semi open tournament. Season two Grand Finals took place December 2–4, 2011 in Ontario, California. The returning champion from season one, Lee "PuMa" Ho Joon from Evil Geniuses battled it out against Song "HerO" Hyeon Deok from Team Liquid in a best of seven series. PuMa defeated HerO 4-2 becoming a two time NASL Champion and winning $40,000 in prize money.

== Season 3 ==
Season 3 of the North American Star League began on April 11, 2012, and consisted of 45 StarCraft players divided into 5 divisions. The season also included a Tribes: Ascend team-based competition. The finals were held on July 14 and 15, 2012 at the International Centre in Toronto, Canada.

=== Season 3 Roster ===
Division 1

- PuMa
- HwangSin
- ClouD
- TT1
- BRAT_OK
- Zenio
- HayprO
- Nightend
- Stephano

Division 2

- HerO
- DeMuslim
- DarkForcE
- CrazyMoviNG
- Nony
- Dimaga
- Ryung
- Hasuobs
- Sjow

Division 3

- Sen
- Ganzi
- MaNa
- TLO
- ViBe
- Rain
- Strelok
- Axslav
- HuK

Division 4

- Thorzain
- Catz
- Alicia
- LoWeLy
- SeleCT
- CrunCher
- aLive
- IdrA
- Ret

Division 5

- Morrow
- Puzzle
- Jinro
- QXC
- MC
- Polt
- Targa
- Sheth
- WhiteRa

== Season 4 ==
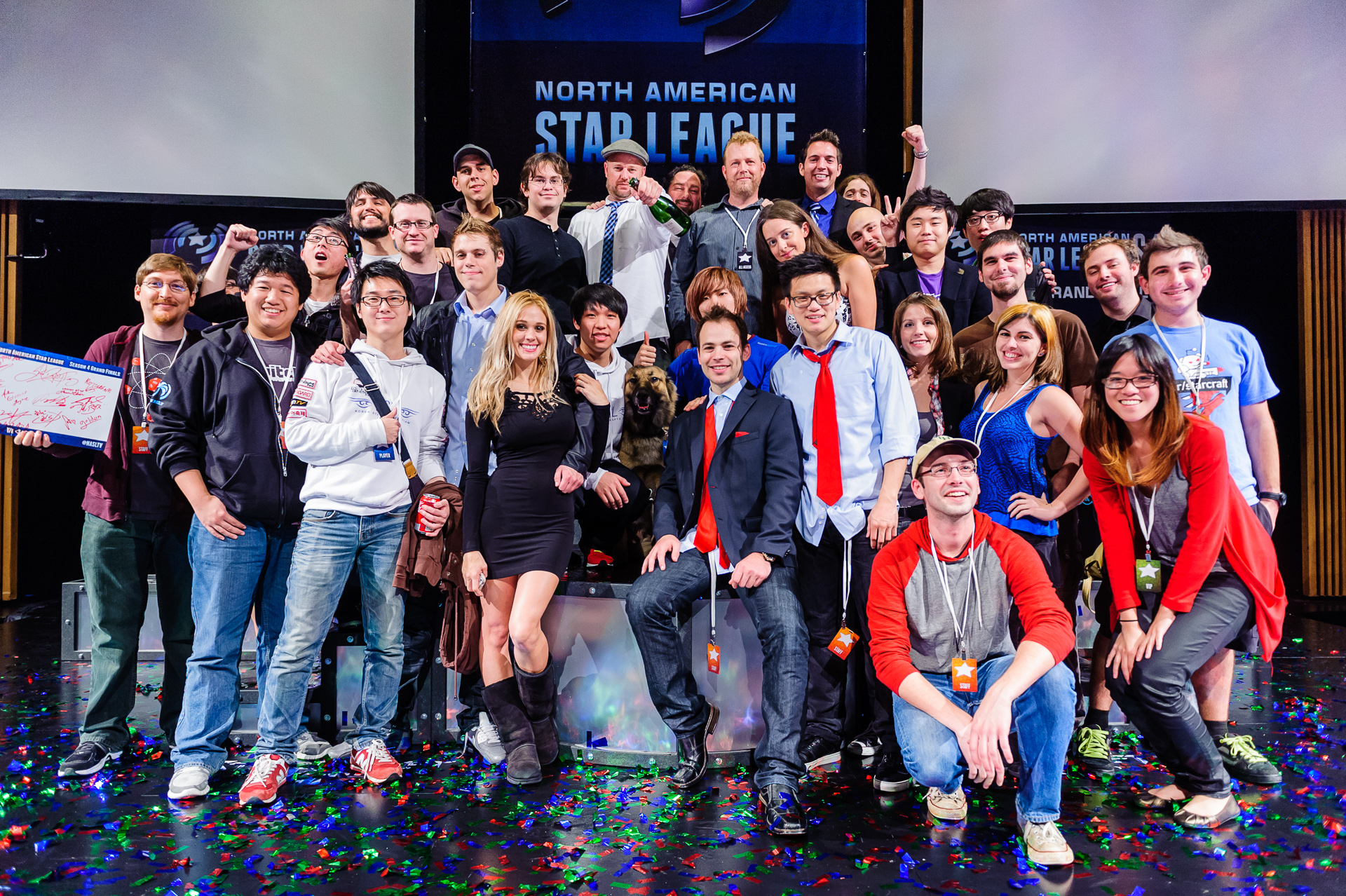
Players, commentators, and staff at NASL Season 4 Grand Finals

Season 4 of the North American Star League began on September 12, 2012, and consisted of 45 StarCraft players divided into 5 divisions. The finals were held December 8 and 9, 2012 at the Center Theater in Long Beach, California.

=== Season 4 Roster ===
Division 1

- aLive
- Arthur
- DongRaeGu
- Hasuobs
- HuK
- MaSa
- MorroW
- Polt
- Ret

Division 2

- ClouD
- Galaxy
- Hyun
- Naniwa
- Oz
- PuMa
- SeleCT
- TLO
- Zenio

Division 3

- Alicia
- BeastyQT
- Dark
- Ganzi
- HerO
- Lowely
- MaNa
- Strelok
- Violet

Division 4

- Bischu
- Hwangsin
- MC
- Ryung
- Sheth
- TaeJa
- TargA
- Thorzain
- ViBe

Division 5

- DeMusliM
- Dimaga
- Finale
- MMA
- Nightend
- QXC
- Sen
- Stephano
- TT1

== Shows & Segments ==
In addition to league programming, the North American Star League began producing eSports related segments and shows, including:

- The Pulse
- Eyes on the Community
- Top 10
- NA Update
- EU Update
- KR Update
- SEA Update
- Up to Speed
- Soe's Corner
- Fierce Fitness
- Mining Out
- eSports Retirement

== Notable players ==
Lim Yo-Hwan (known as "SlayerS_Boxer"), one of Korea's most successful and recognized players, joined the NASL in March 2011. Other notable players include the leading StarCraft progamers Jang Min Chul ("SK.MC"), Park Sung-Joon ("JulyZerg"), Lee Yun-Yeol ("NaDa"), rival former professional Warcraft 3 players Jang Jae Ho ("Moon") and Manuel Schenkhuizen ("Grubby") as well as caster/player Daniel Stemkoski ("Artosis").

== See also ==
- StarCraft: Brood War professional competition
- Starleague (Ongamenet)
- MBCgame Starleague
- GOMTV Global StarCraft II League
