= Global StarCraft II Team League =

- Sport: StarCraft II
- Founded: 2011
- Folded: 2013
- Director: GomTV; Blizzard Entertainment
- Country: Worldwide
- Website: http://www.gomexp.com/

The Global StarCraft II Team League (GSTL) was a StarCraft II tournament series hosted by GomTV and Blizzard Entertainment in South Korea. It ran from 2011 to 2013 as a team event parallel to the individual Global StarCraft II League, broadcast on Thursday and Friday, to not conflict with the GSL's Monday to Wednesday broadcast. Following competition with the KeSPA-run StarCraft II Proleague, which had fully transitioned to Starcraft II in 2013, the GSTL folded, having played its last grand finals event in November 2013.

== Teams ==
This is a list of teams that participated in the final season of the GSTL.

Team	Debut Season	Final Season Result	Final Playoffs Result
Axiom-Acer	2013 GSTL Preseason	1st	1st
AZUBU	2013 GSTL Preseason	2nd	2nd
StarTale	2011 GSTL Feb.	3rd	3rd
For Our Utopia	2011 GSTL Feb.	4th	DNQ
SouL	2011 GSTL Feb.	5th	DNQ

Other teams that participated in prior seasons of the tournament include Incredible Miracle (including with SK Gaming as IM-SK), Team Liquid, MVP, Prime, New Star HoSeo, Fnatic, SlayerS, Old Generations, FXOpen e-Sports, ZeNEX, F.United, and Team SCV Life. Some foreign teams partnered with local ones to participate in the league, including Evil Geniuses with SlayerS under the name SlayerS-EG, Team Liquid (prior to participating on their own) with Old Generations under oGsTL, and Quantic Gaming with StarTale under StarTaleQ. Axiom-Acer was itself a partnership between Axiom eSports and Team Acer, two non-Korean teams.

Of these, Incredible Miracle, StarTale, MVP, Prime, and EG-Liquid, a combination of Evil Geniuses and Team Liquid, moved to the competing StarCraft II Proleague, some before and some after the dissolution of the GSTL.

== History ==
The Global StarCraft II Team League started in February 2011. For its first iterations, the GSTL was a short, 4 day event that invited the top 8 Korean teams to play and took place within a single month. Following three such events in 2011, This format was eventually abandoned due to the popularity of the events, with the tournament series transitioning to multiple month seasons. The new GSTL format allowed a greater number of teams to participate. The inclusion of new teams led to the debut of non-Korean teams participating in the GSTL, both independently and in partnership with local Korean teams. Following this change, the league hovered between 8 and 12 teams, peaking with the latter twice, once each in 2011 and 2012. For its final season, the 2013 HOT6 GSTL Season 2, the league contracted significantly as three teams left the league, with five participating teams remaining. The format changed once again, including a greatly reworked final playoff tournament.

== Champions ==
=== Main Events ===
Season-based	Month-based

Year	Name of Tournament	Winner	Result of Final	Runner-up
2011	Sony Ericsson Global StarCraft II Team League Feb.	Incredible Miracle	5 - 4	Startale
2011	Global StarCraft II Team League Mar.	SlayerS	5 - 4	Incredible Miracle
2011	Global StarCraft II Team League May	SlayerS	5 - 4	MVP
2011	2011 Global StarCraft II Team League Season 1	MVP	5 - 3	Prime
2012	2012 Global StarCraft II Team League Season 1	Prime	5 - 2	StarTaleQ
2012	2012 HOT6 Global StarCraft II Team League Season 2	FXOpen e-Sports	5 - 0	SlayerS
2012	2012 HOT6 Global StarCraft II Team League Season 3	FXOpen e-Sports	5 - 3	MVP
2013	2013 BenQ Global StarCraft II Team League Season 1	Incredible Miracle	4 - 2	AZUBU
2013	2013 HOT6 Global StarCraft II Team League Season 2	Axiom-Acer	2 - 1 ( 6 - 7 )*	AZUBU

- The finals of the 2013 GSTL Season 2 featured a different format, where two best-of-seven matches were played with AZUBU winning the first 4 - 1 and Axiom-Acer winning the second 4–3, leading to an ace match won by Axiom-Acer's INnoVation against AZUBU's Supernova. As a result, the map score of the finals was 6–7 in favor of AZUBU, but the championship title went to Axiom-Acer who won the ace match.

=== World Championship Team Event ===
From March 28 to March 29, 2011, GomTV hosted a special tournament called the 2011 LG Cinema 3D GOMTV World Championship Seoul. The GOMTV World Championship hosted Team Korea vs. World All Stars in a single elimination best of 15 format. The tournament lasted all the way till game 15 but the World All Stars could not complete the come back and beat Team Korea.

Year	Name of Tournament	Winner	Result of Final	Runner-up
2011	Team Korea vs World All Stars (Seoul)	Korea	8 - 7	World

=== Preseason Event ===
On February 12, it was announced that GomTV would be hosting a GSTL Preseason event for the first StarCraft II expansion, Heart of the Swarm. This was the first GomTV tournament played on this new version of the game, and was played on the beta servers. It was the only preseason GSTL event organized, as the league folded following its second 2013 regular season.

Year	Name of Tournament	Winner	Result of Final	Runner-up
2013	2013 Global StarCraft II Team League Preseason	Incredible Miracle (LG-IM)	4-2	AZUBU

== See also ==
- Global StarCraft II League
- StarCraft II in esports
- StarCraft in esports
- Electronic Sports
