= StarCraft: Remastered =

2017 video game

- Box art depicting a Protoss warrior, a Zerg creature, and a Terran soldier
- Developer: Blizzard Entertainment
- Publisher: Blizzard Entertainment
- Series: StarCraft
- Platforms: Microsoft Windows; MacOS
- Release: August 14, 2017
- Genre: Real-time strategy
- Modes: Single-player, multiplayer

StarCraft: Remastered is a 2017 real-time strategy game developed and published by Blizzard Entertainment for Windows and MacOS. It is a remastered edition of the 1998 video game StarCraft and its expansion Brood War. It retains the gameplay of the original StarCraft, but features ultra-high-definition graphics (ultra HD), re-recorded audio, and Blizzard's modern online feature suite. The remaster was developed over the period of a year and included playtesting from professional StarCraft players.

StarCraft: Remastered was the first project released by the "Classic Games division", a team at Blizzard focused on updating and remastering some of their older titles, with an initially announced focus on StarCraft, Diablo II, and Warcraft III. Prior to release, the original StarCraft and its expansion were both made free to download and play. The remaster features redone visuals and sound assets while still using the same engine as the original, which allows for cross-play compatibility across both versions.

It received favorable reviews upon release, with many critics praising its success in updating the visuals while leaving the gameplay unchanged.

== Gameplay ==
StarCraft: Remastered retains the gameplay of the original, but updates its graphics and sound. Its remastered graphics support up to 4K ultra-high-definition resolution, and its original soundtrack and sound effects are re-recorded. Its online features are updated to support Blizzard's modern suite, including improved multiplayer matchmaking, social integration with other Blizzard games, and saved settings on Blizzard's cloud computers such that player campaign progress, replays, custom maps, and keybindings are synced wherever the player opens the game. Players can pair their online accounts from the original game with Blizzard's modern online accounts to continue their win/loss statistics into the remaster. Additionally, players can switch between the original and new graphics and view new zoomed perspectives for players to appreciate the remaster's new level of detail. It was localized into 13 languages.

== Development ==
Blizzard Entertainment developed the remaster over a year. The game's original artist returned to assist with development. Professional StarCraft players from South Korea, including Flash, Bisu, and Jaedong, gave the company feedback during several playtests. Blizzard's president publicly announced the remaster in late March 2017 at a StarCraft event in Seoul, South Korea. It was also announced that later that week, Blizzard would make the original games—the StarCraft Anthology—free to download and would include an update with some of the remaster's features, including the ability to run on modern computers. The remaster was released on macOS and Windows on August 14, 2017. The developer said that their "classic games team" plans to further support the community after the remaster's launch, and will look for feedback on ideas such as voice chat integration. Players who purchased the title in advance of its release received alternative aesthetic options for in-game assets in both the remaster and StarCraft II. Blizzard's Robert Bridenbecker and Pete Stilwell explained to Team Liquid that in almost every respect that Brood War fans care about, StarCraft: Remastered will be the same as Brood War, as it's the same client powering each version. Lemon Sky Studios partnered with Blizzard to provide most of the remastered art assets.

An essay by "Thieving Magpie" of Team Liquid explained the difference between the original and remastered versions, stating that the StarCraft engine generated such "classic" gameplay because of its awkward compromises between a flat 2D engine and the forced isometric perspective it presents to the player. In StarCraft game programmer Patrick Wyatt’s own words: "Because the project was always two months from launch[,] it was inconceivable that there was enough time to re-engineer the terrain engine to make pathfinding easier, so the pathfinding code just had to be made to work. To handle all the tricky edge-cases, the path[find]ing code exploded into a gigantic state machine which encoded all sorts of specialized 'get me out of here' hacks."

== Release ==
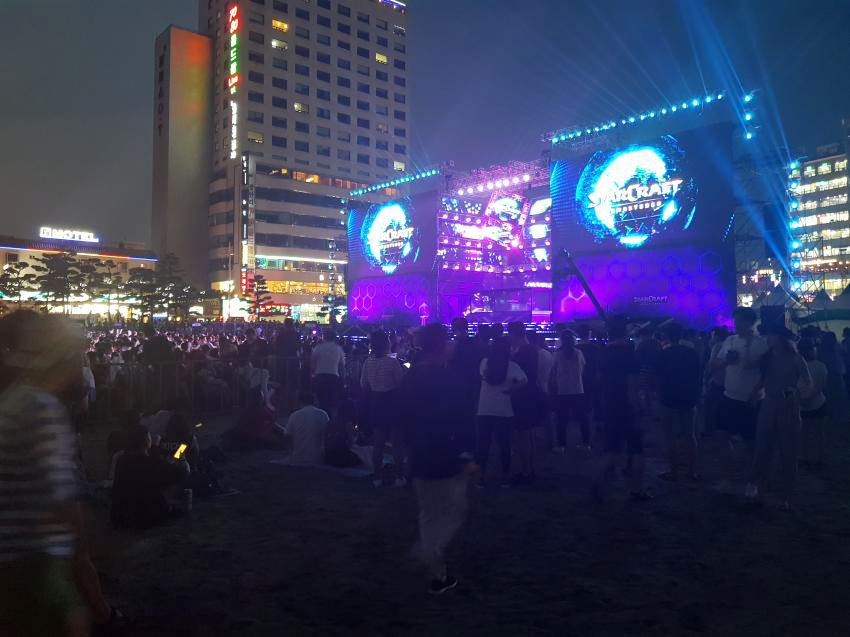
Pre-release launch event of StarCraft: Remastered at Gwangalli Beach in Busan

StarCraft: Remastered had a pre-release of the game in South Korea, where the game was available to play two weeks early in the country's PC bangs. Blizzard also hosted a pre-release launch event at Gwangalli Beach in Busan which was attended live by thousands of spectators and viewed online by over 500,000 viewers. At this celebration, the StarCraft: Remaster Pack was on sale. The event was joined by Guillaume Patry, Hong Jin Ho, Lee Yoon Yeol, Park Jung-suk, and Lee Jae Dong and Kim Taek Yong, and Lee Young Ho.

Following the pre-release in South Korea, a global release event was held on 14 and 15 August 2017, in the headquarters of video live streaming platform Twitch in San Francisco. The event featured retired professional StarCraft players from outside of South Korea taking part in an exhibition tournament over two days. It was hosted by popular StarCraft and StarCraft II personalities Sean "Day[9]" Plott, Nick "Tasteless" Plott, Dan "Artosis" Stemkoski, and Geoff "iNcontroL" Robinson, the latter two of which also competed in the exhibition tournament.

== Post-release ==
Following the game's release, Blizzard announced plans for continued development, including improved matchmaking and support for the game's competitive scene. On June 15, 2018, they announced the launch of the Korea StarCraft League (KSL), a competitive league to run alongside the AfreecaTV StarCraft League (ASL) run by afreecaTV with two seasons planned for that year. The league began airing regular matches starting on July 19, 2018. In February 2019, it was confirmed that the league would continue running beyond its initially announced two-season run for 2018, with 2019's first season running in the first half of that year.

On June 19, 2018, Blizzard announced that a new ranking system would be implemented as part of patch 1.22. This system ranked players from the F to S, the latter representing the top 1% of players. To accompany the new rankings, profiles were updated to include select statistics for players and have borders of their profile portraits corresponding to their ranking. Additional cosmetic rewards for ranked play were unique profile pictures for all players ranked B, A, or S. The update also featured general improvements to matchmaking, an updated map pool.

The first post-release monetization came on April 30, 2019, with the introduction of purchasable announcers to the game which replaced the default announcers with popular community figures. Blizzard initially worked with three popular South Korean StarCraft casters, Yong "Jeon" Jun, Kim Jung Min, and Jae "Um" Kyung to create a total of four announcer packs, one each and one that featured all three of them.

=== StarCraft: Cartooned ===
On June 8, 2019, as part of the grand finals of the third season of the KSL, Blizzard announced a graphics overhaul pack for the game by Carbot Animations, the producers of multiple Blizzard-related parody animations, including their first and longest-running one, the StarCrafts series. As a graphical overhaul, its effect applies to all game modes and menus in StarCraft: Remastered. It was released on July 10, 2019, as StarCraft: Cartooned alongside an announcer pack featuring South Korean YouTuber and children's television host Hyejin "Hey Jini" Kang.

== Reception ==
Reception

Aggregate score
| Aggregator | Score |
|---|---|
| Metacritic | 85/100 |

Review scores
| Publication | Score |
|---|---|
| IGN | 9/10 |
| Softpedia | 9/10 |
| AusGamers | 9/10 |
| 4Players | 80% |
| PC Games | 80% |

Following resumed updates for the original StarCraft and its expansion, Brood War, gaming and tech outlets praised Blizzard's commitment to its older games. The announcement of the original game becoming free and a remaster being in development was also met with speculation of potential other remasters coming from Blizzard.

StarCraft: Remastered received favorable reviews upon release, with critics praising its visual improvements and commitment to the original's gameplay. On Metacritic, it currently has an average score of 85 out of 100 based on 30 critics, indicating "generally favorable reviews". PCGamer's Tyler Wilde commended the game's successful modernization and stated that, despite minor grievances, "This is a project for StarCraft fans that serves them whether they spend $15 or not, and makes no compromises." In a positive review, IGN's TJ Hafer praised the game's faithfulness to the original and concluded, "StarCraft Remastered makes the original game play as well as you remember and look as good as you remember."

Some reviewers took issue with the unchanged gameplay of StarCraft: Remastered and expressed concern that it would not be friendly to new players. In an overall positive review, Softpedia's Silviu Stahie wondered if the decision to leave the gameplay of the original untouched would hurt the title's appeal and stated, "[...] the new generation might not appreciate it." Similar worries were shared by M3's Viktor Eriksson, who felt that the remaster was unnecessary, with no changes to the gameplay and too few changes overall.
