= Korea StarCraft League =

Korean StarCraft: Remastered Tournament Series

Korea StarCraft League (KSL)
- Sport: StarCraft: Remastered
- Founded: June 2018
- Folded: March 2020
- Country: South Korea
- Continent: Asia
- Last champion: Lee "Light" Jae-ho
- Most titles: Kim "Last" Sung Hyun, Kim "Soulkey" Min Chul, Jung "Rain" Yoon Jong, Lee "Light" Jae-ho
- Broadcaster: Twitch
- Website: https://ksl.starcraft.com/en-us/

The Korea StarCraft League (KSL) was a StarCraft: Remastered tournament series hosted by Blizzard Entertainment in South Korea. It was announced in June 2018 and began its first season the following month. It was broadcast regularly in Korean and English on Twitch. The main English language casters for the event were Dan "Artosis" Stemkoski and Nicolas "Tasteless" Plott. It ran alongside afreecaTV's AfreecaTV StarCraft League (ASL) as one of the two top level Korean leagues for StarCraft: Remastered. KSL was discontinued in March 2020 after 4 seasons (that is, tournaments).

== History ==
The KSL was announced to coincide with the 20th anniversary of the StarCraft series, becoming the first Blizzard-run league for the Korean StarCraft scene since StarCraft's release in 1998. Prior to the first season's finals, the second season was announced, with qualifiers in late September of that year and regular play starting in October. The finals of the first season took place in the Yes24 Live Hall in Seoul, with Kim "Last" Sung Hyun becoming the first champion of the KSL.

During BlizzCon 2018, the champions of both Korean StarCraft leagues, the KSL and ASL, faced off in a showmatch called KSL vs. ASL.

The finals of the second and last season of the inaugural year of the league took place in Kwangwoon University Donghae Arts Center, with Kim "Soulkey" Min Chul becoming the new champion.

In February 2019 the third season of competition was announced, confirming the KSL would run in 2019 as well. The third season's finals took place in Nexon Arena in Seoul. With his victory over Byun "Mini" Hyun Je, Jung "Rain" Yoon Jong became the second player to have won both top level Korean leagues in the post-KeSPA period.

The fourth season was organized in the autumn of 2019; Lee "Light" Jae-ho won the tournament.

As of March 20, 2020, it was announced that KSL would no longer be continued as AfreecaTV and Blizzard had signed an exclusive deal to broadcast all Blizzard e-sports.

== Results ==
Year	Name of Tournament	Winner	Result of Final	Runner-up
2018	Korea StarCraft League Season 1	Kim "Last" Sung Hyun (Terran)	4 - 0	Lee "Jaedong" Jae-dong (Zerg)
2018	Korea StarCraft League Season 2	Kim "Soulkey" Min Chul (Zerg)	4 - 1	Jo "Sharp" Ki Seok (Terran)
2019	Korea StarCraft League Season 3	Jung "Rain" Yoon Jong (Protoss)	4 - 1	Byun "Mini" Hyun Je (Protoss)
2019	Korea StarCraft League Season 4	Lee "Light" Jae-ho (Terran)	4 - 2	Jung "Rain" Yoon Jong (Protoss)
