= Chandigarh Landstack =

GIS-based digital land records platform

- Website type: E-governance land records portal
- Available in: English
- Owner: Chandigarh Administration
- Creators: National Informatics Centre (NIC), Chandigarh; Department of Revenue, Chandigarh Administration
- Website: landstack.chd.gov.in
- Commercial: No
- Registration: Required for certain services
- Launched: 31 December 2025; 10 months ago
- Current status: Active (pilot)

Chandigarh Landstack is a GIS-based digital land records platform operated by the Chandigarh Administration in the union territory of Chandigarh, India. It provides single-window, parcel-level access to property and land information by consolidating records held across multiple government departments into one unified portal. The portal is the Chandigarh implementation of the national Land Stack initiative, launched on 31 December 2025 with Chandigarh and Tamil Nadu as the two pilot locations.

The platform was developed under the Digital India Land Record Modernisation Programme (DILRMP) of the Ministry of Rural Development, Government of India, and is described by the administration as a first-of-its-kind national digital land governance initiative.

== Background ==
Land Stack was conceived under the Digital India Land Record Modernisation Programme (DILRMP) to address the fragmentation of land records, which are typically maintained separately by revenue, registration, planning and municipal departments. Drawing on land-administration models in Singapore, the United Kingdom and Finland, the initiative was envisaged as an integrated, GIS-based digital platform offering single-window access to land and property information for both citizens and government agencies.

The national initiative was launched on 31 December 2025 in New Delhi by Chandra Sekhar Pemmasani, Minister of State for Rural Development and Communications, who simultaneously released the multilingual Glossary of Revenue Terms (GoRT) to harmonise land-administration terminology across Indian languages.

== Launch ==
The Chandigarh Landstack portal was formally launched on 31 December 2025 in a hybrid-mode event. It was inaugurated by Minister of State Chandra Sekhar Pemmasani from New Delhi, and launched from Chandigarh by H. Rajesh Prasad, IAS, Chief Secretary, Chandigarh Administration.

Officials present at the launch included Manoj Joshi, Secretary, Department of Land Resources (DoLR); S. Chockalingam, IAS, Chairman of the Land Stack Committee; Kunal Satyarthi, Joint Secretary, DoLR; Mandip Singh Brar, IAS, Home Secretary; Nishant Kumar Yadav, IAS, Deputy Commissioner, Chandigarh; and Vivek Verma, State Informatics Officer, National Informatics Centre (NIC) Chandigarh. The Deputy Commissioner presented a walkthrough of the portal's architecture, scope and real-time functionalities during the event.

The Chandigarh Administration developed the portal within a span of about six months. At the launch, the Minister described it as scalable, interoperable and future-ready.

== Features ==
Chandigarh Landstack integrates property and parcel-level land information on a GIS-based digital platform, allowing users to access comprehensive land-related data through a single interface. For each individual land parcel, the portal provides:

- Property details
- Ownership information
- Deed records
- Encumbrance details
- Litigation status

The platform covers both the planned urban sectors of Chandigarh and areas historically designated as villages, offering access to revenue identifiers such as Hadbast, Khewat, Mustil and Khasra numbers. This is intended to bring rural and urban land records together on one common digital platform.

Officials have indicated that the system is designed with modern IT solutions, including the planned use of blockchain technology, to help ensure the authenticity and privacy of data.

== Objectives ==
The stated objective of the portal is to establish a citizen-centric land information ecosystem that enables easy property search and seamless access to critical land data. Intended benefits include:

- Improved transparency and citizen trust
- Reduced risk of inadvertent purchase of unauthorised or non-compliant property
- Streamlined service delivery and reduced dependence on physical visits to government offices
- Better inter-departmental coordination and data-driven governance

== Significance ==
Chandigarh and Tamil Nadu serve as the two pilot locations for the national Land Stack rollout, with their portals positioned as reference models for other states and union territories and for eventual integration into national digital platforms. The Tribune reported it as the first time Chandigarh had received a unified portal for accessing land data.

== See also ==
- Digital India
- E-governance
- Land registration
- National Informatics Centre
