= SSL =

SSL may refer to:

== Arts and media ==
- Sesame Street Live, a touring version of the children's television show
- SOOP StarCraft League, formerly known as AfreecaTV StarCraft League
- StarCraft II StarLeague, a Korean league in the video game
- Super Smash Land, a Super Smash Bros. fangame
- Supersonic Legend, a rank in Rocket League
- Shifting Sand Land, a level in Super Mario 64

== Linguistics ==
- Samoan Sign Language
- Selangor Sign Language
- Somali Sign Language
- Spanish as a Second Language
- Spanish Sign Language
- Swedish Sign Language

== Organizations ==
=== Businesses ===
- SSL (company), formerly Space Systems/Loral, a satellite manufacturer
- Sainsbury's Supermarkets Ltd, a British supermarket chain
- Solid State Logic, a manufacturer of audio mixing consoles
- System Simulation Ltd, a British software company

=== University laboratories ===
- Space Sciences Laboratory, in Berkeley, California, United States
- Space Systems Laboratory (Maryland), at the University of Maryland, United States (formerly at MIT)
- Space Systems Laboratory (MIT), at the Massachusetts Institute of Technology (separate from the SSL that moved to UMD)
- Space Systems Laboratory, at other universities

=== Other organizations ===
- Sisters of St. Louis, a congregation of Roman Catholic nuns

== Places ==
- South Salt Lake, Utah, a city in the United States
- Social Science Library, Oxford, at the University of Oxford, United Kingdom

== Science and technology ==
=== Computing and electronics ===
- Secure Sockets Layer, a former standard link encryption technology, deprecated in 2015
  - Transport Layer Security, the successor of the above standard
- Solid-state lighting
- Semi-supervised learning and Self-supervised learning, classes of machine learning techniques
- Single stuck line, a fault model for digital circuits
- Start-stop logic
- S/SL programming language

=== Other uses in science and technology ===
- Sodium stearoyl lactylate, a food additive
- Standard sea level, physical conditions at sea level
- Sumatra squall lines, a weather phenomenon that affects the Malay Peninsula and Singapore

== Railroads ==
- Sub-surface lines, cut-and cover railway lines forming part of London Underground
- South Shore Line, commuter railroad linking Chicago to South Bend, Indiana

== Sport ==
=== Association football ===
- Serbian SuperLiga, top division association football league in Serbia
- Soviet Second League, a defunct association football league in the Soviet Union
  - Soviet Second League B
- S.S. Lazio (Società Sportiva Lazio), an Italian football team
- Swiss Super League, top division association football league in Switzerland

=== Esports ===
- SOOP StarCraft League, formerly known as AfreecaTV StarCraft League
- StarCraft II StarLeague, a Korean league in the video game

=== Other sports ===
- Shakey's Super League, a Filipino collegiate and high school volleyball league
- RoboCup Small Size League, robotics football competition
- Star Sailors League, a sailing league
- South Shore League, an athletic conference in Massachusetts, US
- Swedish Super League (men's floorball), a floorball league in Sweden
- Swedish Super League (women's floorball), a floorball league in Sweden
- Saitama Seibu Lions, a baseball team in Japan

== Other uses ==
- Licentiate in Sacred Scripture
