= ASL (StarCraft) =

South Korean video game tournament

- Sport: StarCraft: Brood War; StarCraft: Remastered
- Founded: June 2016
- Country: South Korea
- Continent: Asia
- Most recent champion: Kim "SoulKey" Min Chul (Zerg) (ASL Season 22)
- Most titles: Kim "SoulKey" Min Chul (5)
- Broadcasters: SOOP; YouTube
- Website: https://ch.sooplive.co.kr/afstar1

The ASL is a StarCraft: Remastered tournament series in South Korea, hosted by SOOP, a video streaming service. For most of its history, the tournament was named the AfreecaTV StarCraft League (Korean: 아프리카TV 스타리그), then the SOOP StarCraft League (SSL), and now simply ASL. It began its first season in June 2016 and used StarCraft: Brood War for its first three seasons prior to the release of StarCraft: Remastered. It is broadcast regularly in Korean on SOOP. Dan "Artosis" Stemkoski and Nicolas "Tasteless" Plott provide English rebroadcasts on SOOP's YouTube channel.

In 2018 and 2019 it ran alongside Blizzard Entertainment's Korea StarCraft League (KSL) as one of the two top level Korean leagues for StarCraft: Remastered. On March 20, 2020, Blizzard discontinued the KSL tournament series, once again leaving the ASL as the only top level Korean league for StarCraft: Remastered.

SSL logo

On July 25, 2024, it rebranded to SOOP StarCraft League (SSL) to reflect the rebranding of AfreecaTV to SOOP. The naming format of the tournament also changed, with the first season under the SSL branding being SOOP StarCraft League 2024 AUTUMN, starting on August 26, 2024.

The name was reverted to ASL the next season.

== Results ==
Year	Name of Tournament	Winner	Result of Final	Runner-up
2016	Afreeca StarCraft League Season 1	Kim "Shuttle" Yoon Joong (Protoss)	3 - 0	Jo "Sharp" Ki Seok (Terran)
2016	Afreeca StarCraft League Season 2	Lee "Flash" Young-ho (Terran)	3 - 1	Yum "Sea" Bo Sung (Terran)
2017	Afreeca StarCraft League Season 3	Lee "Flash" Young-ho (Terran)	3 - 0	Lee "Shine" Young Han (Zerg)
2017	Afreeca StarCraft League Season 4	Lee "Flash" Young-ho (Terran)	3 - 1	Jo "hero" Il Jang (Zerg)
2018	Afreeca StarCraft League Season 5	Jung "Rain" Yoon Jong (Protoss)	3 - 1	Jang "Snow" Yoon Chul (Protoss)
2018	Afreeca StarCraft League Season 6	Kim "Effort" Jung Woo (Zerg)	3 - 2	Lee "Flash" Young-ho (Terran)
2019	Afreeca StarCraft League Season 7	Kim "Last" Sung Hyun (Terran)	3 - 1	Byun "mini" Hyun Je (Protoss)
2019	Afreeca StarCraft League Season 8	Lee "Flash" Young-ho (Terran)	4 - 0	Jang "Snow" Yoon Chul (Protoss)
2020	Afreeca StarCraft League Season 9	Kim "Queen" Myung Woon (Zerg)	4 - 1	Lee "Light" Jae Ho (Terran)
2020	Afreeca StarCraft League Season 10	Kim "Queen" Myung Woon (Zerg)	4 - 3	Park "Soma" Sang Hyun (Zerg)
2021	Afreeca StarCraft League Season 11	Lim "Larva" Hong Gyu (Zerg)	4 - 3	Byun "mini" Hyun Je (Protoss)
2021	Afreeca StarCraft League Season 12	Byun "mini" Hyun Je (Protoss)	4 - 3	Yoo "Rush" Young Jin (Terran)
2022	Afreeca StarCraft League Season 13	Lee "Light" Jae Ho (Terran)	4 - 0	Jung "Rain" Yoon Jong (Protoss)
2022	Afreeca StarCraft League Season 14	Kim "Royal" Ji Sung (Terran)	4 - 2	Yoo "Rush" Young Jin (Terran)
2023	Afreeca StarCraft League Season 15	Jung "JyJ" Young Jae (Terran)	4 - 1	Park "Mind" Sung Gyoon (Terran)
2023	Afreeca StarCraft League Season 16	Kim "SoulKey" Minchul (Zerg)	4 - 1	Byun "mini" Hyun Je (Protoss)
2024	Afreeca StarCraft League Season 17	Kim "SoulKey" Minchul (Zerg)	4 - 3	Jo "Hero" Iljang (Zerg)
2024	SOOP StarCraft League 2024 AUTUMN	Kim "SoulKey" Minchul (Zerg)	4 - 1	Jo "Sharp" Ki Seok (Terran)
2025	ASL Season 19	Kim "SoulKey" Minchul (Zerg)	4 - 3	Doh "Best" Jae Wook (Protoss)
2025	ASL Season 20	Park "Soma" Sang Hyun (Zerg)	4 - 2	Jang "Snow" Yoon Chul (Protoss)
2026	ASL Season 21	Park "Soma" Sang Hyun (Zerg)	4 - 3	Lee "Flash" Young-ho (Terran)
2026	ASL Season 22	Kim "SoulKey" Min Chul (Zerg)	4 - 3	Yoo "Rush" Young Jin (Terran)
