= SOOP Corp. =

South Korean tech company

SOOP Co., Ltd.
- Company type: Public (KRX: 067160)(2011-present)
- Industry: Content delivery network, video games, Media industry
- Predecessors: Nowcom
- Founded: 2011
- Headquarters: Gyeonggi Province, South Korea
- Products: SOOP Live, TalesRunner, O2Jam, ClubBox, Nownuri
- Owner: Kevin Seo: 25.33% JPMorgan Chase: 8.49% Swedbank: 6.81% KR Gov.: 5.40% Jung Chan-yong: 0.38%
- Website: sooplive.co.kr(Corporate website)

SOOP Co., Ltd. (formerly known as AfreecaTV Co., Ltd) is a South Korean IT and media company established in 2011 following the corporate split of Nowcom. The restructuring created two entities, including AfreecaTV Co., Ltd. and ZettaMedia.

The company is best known for operating the live streaming platform SOOP, formerly known as AfreecaTV. In 2024, AfreecaTV Co., Ltd. was rebranded as SOOP Co., Ltd. as part of its global expansion strategy.

== Services ==
- SOOP: Online TV with P2P video streaming service. Launched as AfreecaTV in 2005, users can upload their own videos as well as live video streams. Since 2024, it is available in two distinct versions for Korea and Global users.
- TalesRunner: Racing video game
- O2Jam: Music video game
- ClubBox: Web storage service for any internet community
- Nownuri: Classic VT BBS
- NOWCDN: CDN service for massive file distribution such as game clients

== Nowcom split ==
Nowcom
- Company type: Public (KRX: 026330) (until 2011)
- Industry: Content delivery network, video games, Media industry
- Founded: 1994
- Defunct: 2011
- Fate: Divided into AfreecaTV Co., Ltd. and ZettaMedia
- Headquarters: Gyeonggi Province, South Korea
- Key people: ex-CEO Yong-sik Moon
- Products: Afreeca, TalesRunner, O2Jam, ClubBox, Nownuri
- Number of employees: 300

Nowcom was a South Korean IT Company founded in 1994. The first service of Nowcom in South Korea was Nownuri, a VT-based online BBS started in 1994, and currently they operate Afreeca, SOOP Live TalesRunner, O2Jam and ClubBox and Nownuri. Nowcom was merged by Wins Technet, a listed IT company, at January 2008 and listed on KOSDAQ with its original name though and worked together for 3 years, but finally they have been separated again to two companies as they were.

In July 2011, Nowcom announced that its assets would be split into one publicly traded company and the other privately held company. Nowcom's assets was split into one publicly traded company, one oriented towards webcasting and online game development, and the other privately held company towards contents, media, and web storage. The split formally took place in July 2011; where the present Nowcom was renamed AfreecaTV Co., Ltd. and consists primarily of Afreeca, TalesRunner, and O2Jam, while a new ZettaMedia was formed to take on Nownuri, PDBox, and ClubBox.
