= Savior (gamer) =

South Korean electronic sports player

sAviOr
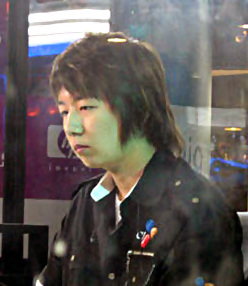

Personal information
- Name: 마재윤 (Ma Jae-yoon)
- Nickname: The Maestro
- Nationality: Republic of Korea

Career information
- Games: StarCraft: Brood War
- Playing career: Until 2010
- Role: Zerg

Team history
- 2006: Greatest Ones
- 2006–2010: CJ Entus

Korean name
- Hangul: 마재윤
- Hanja: 馬在允
- RR: Ma Jaeyun
- MR: Ma Chaeyun

Ma Jae-yoon (Korean: 마재윤; Hanja: 馬在允), known by the pseudonym sAviOr (previously IPXZerg), and dubbed "The Maestro", is a former professional South Korean e-sports gamer of the real-time strategy game StarCraft. He played the Zerg race and was one of the most successful and popular players of all time. Savior was one of several players implicated in the 2010 match fixing scandal, and as a result he was banned from KeSPA-run competition for life. After retiring as a pro-gamer, sAviOr began streaming on AfreecaTV, but AfreecaTV made the decision to ban several players implicated in match-fixing offenses from the platform, including sAviOr. Ma Jae-yoon was a member of CJ Entus, a professional StarCraft: Brood War e-sports team sponsored by CJ CGV, an entertainment subsidiary of the CJ Corporation.

== Career ==
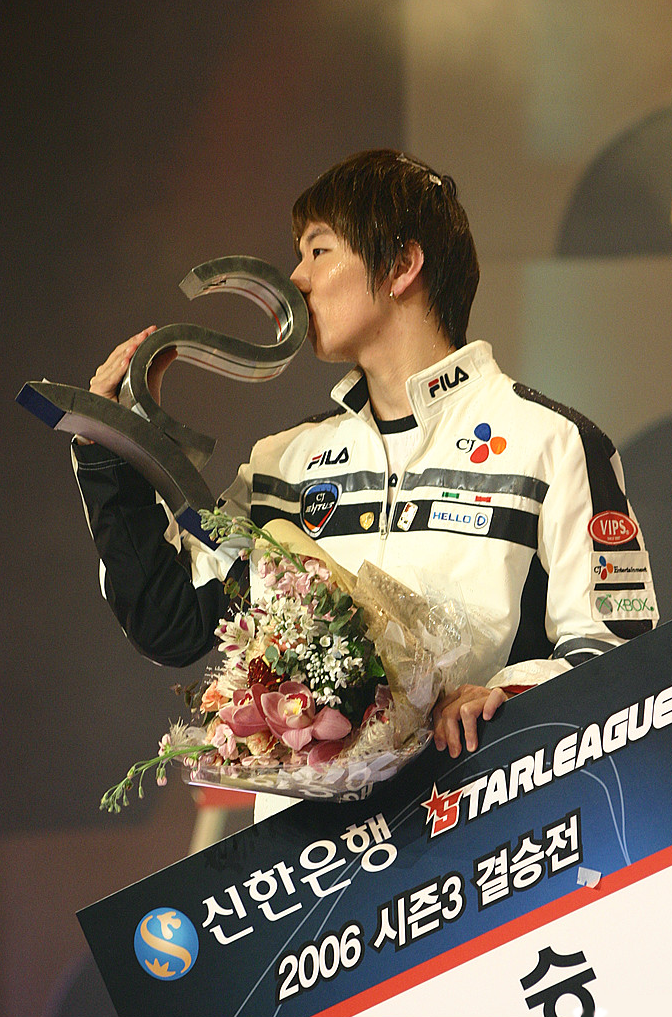
Ma Jae-yoon after winning the 2006 Shinhan Bank Starleague

Ma Jae-yoon has been rated first in the Korean e-Sports Player's Association (KeSPA) ratings nine times. sAviOr is widely considered to have been the most dominant professional Brood War player of 2006. He has won three MSLs (MBCGame Starleague) and one OSL (Ongamenet Starleague). However, these records no longer stand as they were expunged with his ban from competition.

=== Decline ===
During the 2007–2008 seasons Ma Jae-yoon lost several important matches. He especially faltered in the latest season of matches, where he was eliminated in the first round of both the MSL and the OSL with a total record of 0–5. One theory of his decline in performance during this time is that he was devastated and never recovered from his 0–3 loss to Kim Taek-Yong (Bisu) in the GOM TV Season 1 MSL finals on 3 March 2007; and then later, in November 2007, he lost to Bisu again in the quarterfinals of the 2007 Ever OSL 1–2.

Ma Jae-yoon was ranked 5th in the March 2008 KeSPA ranking with 1,540.5 points, he was behind Lee Jae-Dong (Jaedong) (2,400.3), Kim Taek-Yong (Bisu) (2,302.6), Song Byung-Goo (Stork) (2,219.6), and Lee Young-Ho (Flash) (1,747.5).

His career hit a new low when he failed to make it past the first round in the 2008 EVER OSL. He lost to the newcomer Spear, and then to his old rival, Lee Yun Yeol (NaDa). He was demoted to the CJ Entus B-team, but his improved performance following the demotion allowed him to return to CJ Entus Team A on 21 July 2008.

Ma Jae-yoon went 8–1 and won the Blizzcon 2008 tournament by defeating Nada 2–0 in the finals. Afterwards, in an interview, he stated that he "will destroyed [sic] everyone in 2009".

In September 2009, Ma Jae-yoon gave an interview that said he had finally gotten over his mental state, and is quoted to be saying "Look forward to my StarLeague win". He has since been shown in the proleague each matchup.

=== Match fixing scandal ===
On 13 April 2010, Ma was implicated in a cheating scandal involving several Korean pro gamers, illegal betting websites, and allegations of games being deliberately lost. By May, it was alleged that the "Maestro" had been a ring-leader in a scheme that saw at least 12 StarCraft matches deliberately lost and eleven pro-gamers (current and former) implicated. He was subsequently banned for life from professional competition and it has been reported that all awards and honorary achievements have been revoked.

In December 2013, sAviOr competed in the Asia Brood War Championship Open in Shanghai, winning the team contest with Team Korea. KeSPA expressed disappointment that Ma was allowed to compete at a Brood War tournament despite being banned for life by the organization.
