= National Informatics Centre =

Science and technology agency of the Government of India

- Abbreviation: NIC
- Formation: 1976 (50 years ago)
- Type: Digital information
- Headquarters: New Delhi
- Location: Pan India
- Region served: India
- Official language: English and Hindi
- Director General: Shri Priyank Bharti IAS
- Parent organisation: Ministry of Electronics and Information Technology
- Budget: ₹11.5 billion (US$120 million)
- Staff: 3557 (September 2026)
- Website: www.nic.gov.in
- ASN: 4758
- Traffic Levels: 70–80 Gbit/s

The National Informatics Centre (NIC) is an Indian government department under the Ministry of Electronics and Information Technology (MeitY).

It provides infrastructure, IT consultancy, IT services including but not limited to architecture, design, development and implementation of IT systems to central government departments and state governments, helping in implementing the digitization initiatives of Digital India.

The organisation also carries out research in the IT domain and recruits various scientists and Scientific/Technical Assistants. The organisation's primary function is to cater to ICT needs at all levels of governance and facilitate digital access to government services for citizens.

== History ==
The National Informatics Centre (NIC) is an Indian government department under the Ministry of Electronics and Information Technology (MeitY). Established in 1976, NIC provides information technology infrastructure and support to central and state government ministries, departments, and agencies. It is responsible for the development, maintenance, and operation of government IT systems, networks, and data centres, and supports the delivery of digital services by public authorities.

It had an annual budget of ₹11.5 billion (US$120 million) for the year 2018–19. Most of this is spent in providing free services to various government departments.

== Infrastructure and services ==
National Informatics Centre Services include:

- Digital Government Research Centre (DGRC)
- Government Local Area Networks (LANs)
- Video conferencing
- National Knowledge Network (NKN)
- Mobile competency centre
- Email & messaging
- Remote sensing & GIS
- Webcast
- Domain registration
- National Cloud
- Command and control
- NICNET
- Data centre
- Security
- Blockchain Technology

NIC's Network, "NICNET", facilitates the institutional linkages with the Ministries/Departments of the Central Government, state Governments and District administrations of India. NIC is the primary constructor of e-government applications. It also manages the National Knowledge Network.

=== Data centres and offices ===
In 2018, NIC opened its fourth data centre in Bhubaneshwar to complement its existing data centres in New Delhi, Hyderabad and Pune. In addition to the National Data Centres, NIC offices include Head Quarters situated in New Delhi and has State Centres in all 36 states and Union territories. This is supplemented by 741 district offices.

=== National cloud ===
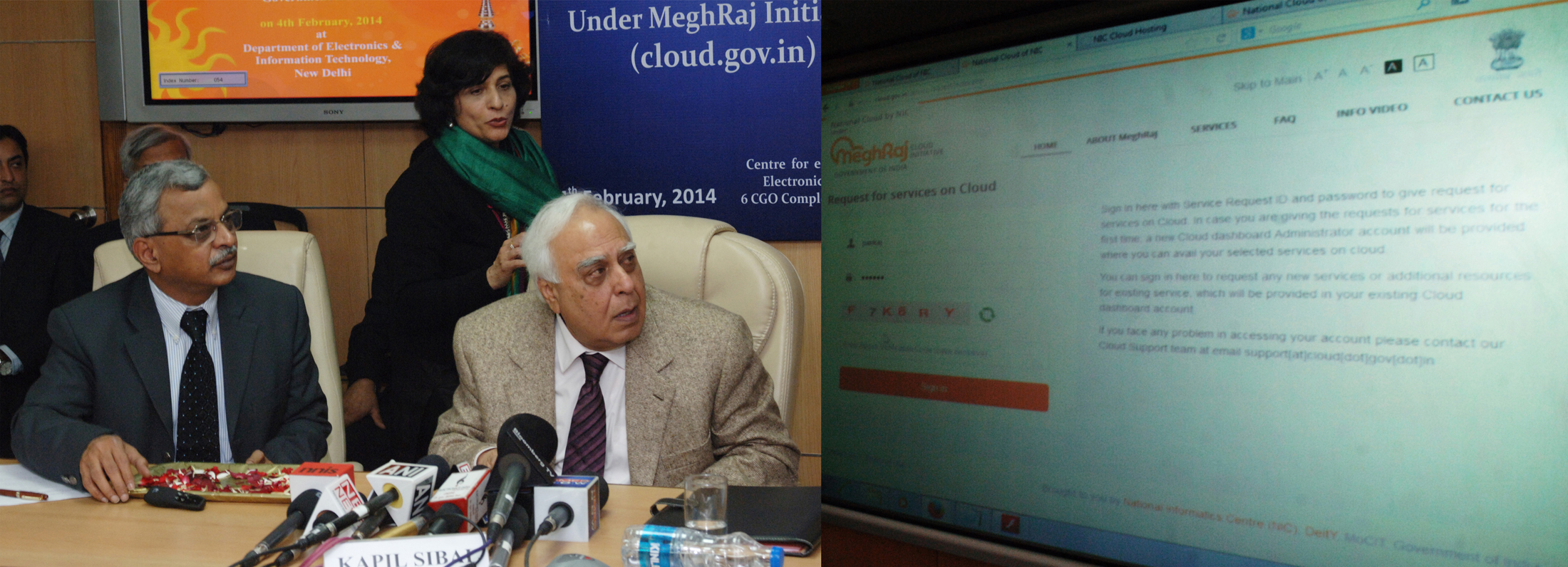
Kapil Sibal inaugurating the ‘National Cloud’ MeghRaj in February 2014

National Informatics Centre developed GI Cloud named as MeghRaj. This project was launched by Government of India for cloud computing in February 2014. MeghRaj Cloud offers a variety of service model like platform as a service (PaaS), infrastructure as a service (IaaS), software as a service (Saas), virtual servers, Kubernetes containers, dev ops, etc. In April 2023, Jio Platforms secured a ₹3.5 billion (equivalent to ₹3.8 billion or US$40 million in 2026) contract to manage and improve the cloud services of National Informatics Centre (NIC) for five years for onsite maintenance at various data centres in Delhi, Pune, and Bhubaneswar.

=== Centres of Excellence ===
The following CoE (Centre of Excellence) has been established:

- Artificial intelligence
- Blockchain technology
- Microservices
- Data analytics
- Application security

NIC established the Centre of Excellence in Artificial Intelligence in 2019 to explore more opportunities for AI applications in governance. In 2020, the Union Government and NIC has launched the Centre of Excellence (CoE) in blockchain technology in Bengaluru.

=== Bharat Maps ===
Bharat Maps is a web mapping service maintained by the National Informatics Centre. The project was implemented in the 2004–09 five-year cycle and the data is derived from Survey of India, Registrar General of India and Indian Space Research Organization. The maps are used by various government departments for official purposes and is also available for the use of consumers.

=== National Portal of India ===
NIC maintains the National Portal of India. The portal contains the Constitution of India, and has a design objective to a single point to access the information and services of the Government of India.

== Controversies ==
=== 2014 unauthorized digital certificate issuance ===
In July 2014, Google discovered that the National Informatics Centre, which operated as an intermediate certificate authority (CA) under the Ministry of Communications and Information Technology's Controller of Certifying Authorities (India CCA), had issued unauthorized SSL/TLS digital certificates for several Google domains, including google.com and mail.google.com.

Such unauthorized certificates could have allowed attackers to stage man-in-the-middle (MitM) attacks and decrypt user traffic without triggering browser warnings on systems trusting the India CCA root. Following notifications by Google and Microsoft, India's CCA revoked three subordinate CA certificates held by the NIC. Major web browsers subsequently moved to revoke or strictly constrain the trust scope of India CCA-issued certificates.

=== Aadhaar eKYC API vulnerability (2017) ===
In August 2017, investigative reports and police inquiries revealed that an unauthenticated API endpoint hosted on NIC's mobile governance portal (Mobile Seva) had allowed external applications to access Aadhaar demographic data without proper authorization. Software developer Abhinav Srivastav was arrested in Bengaluru after developing an unauthorized mobile app, "Aadhaar eKYC", that routed requests through NIC's vulnerable endpoint. Digital rights advocates questioned why the NIC had left the endpoint exposed without authentication checks or rate limiting.

=== Aarogya Setu transparency and privacy concerns (2020) ===
During the COVID-19 pandemic, the NIC led the technical rollout of Aarogya Setu, the Government of India's contact-tracing application. The platform drew scrutiny from cybersecurity researchers, privacy advocates, and legal scholars over its centralized storage architecture, Bluetooth and GPS telemetry collection, and the absence of a comprehensive national data protection legal framework.

In October 2020, the Central Information Commission (CIC) issued show-cause notices to chief public information officers across the NIC and MeitY after authorities provided evasive and contradictory responses to Right to Information queries regarding the origins, ownership, and creation records of the application. MeitY subsequently issued a clarification stating that the app was built through public-private collaboration involving volunteer developers and industry professionals alongside the NIC.

=== Infrastructure security and targeted cyberattacks ===
Because the NIC manages the core computing and communication backbone for Indian government agencies, its infrastructure has frequently been targeted by sophisticated cyber threats:

- 2020 Phishing Compromise: In September 2020, the Delhi Police Special Cell opened an investigation under the Information Technology Act, 2000 after a spear-phishing attack breached an estimated 100 computing systems connected to the NIC network, potentially exposing sensitive communications of senior officials across the Prime Minister's Office, National Security Council, and Ministry of External Affairs.
- Credential Harvesting Campaigns: In 2022, cybersecurity threat intelligence reports documented sustained credential-harvesting and domain-spoofing campaigns (notably by the threat group RedAlpha) that created lookalike login portals imitating NIC services to target government personnel and military contractors.

== See also ==
- Electronic Transaction Aggregation & Analysis Layer

== Sources ==
- Bhattacharya, Jaijit (2006). Technology In Government, 1/e. Jaijit Bhattacharya. ISBN 978-81-903397-4-2.
- Bhagavan, M.R. (1997). New Generic Technologies in Developing Countries. London & New York: Macmillan & St. Martin. ISBN 978-0-333-65049-3.
- Government of India (2019). Ministry of Electronics & Information Technology — Annual Report 2018–19 (PDF) (Report). Government of India. Archived (PDF) from the original on 5 November 2019.
- Malwad, N. M. (1996). Digital Libraries: Dynamic Storehouse of Digitized Information : Papers Presented at the SIS '96 15th Annual Convention and Conference 18-20 January, 1996 Bangalore. Taylor & Francis. ISBN 978-81-224-0898-0.
- Prabhu, C. S. R. (2012). E-Governance: Concepts and Case Studies (6 ed.). PHI Learning Pvt. Ltd. ISBN 978-81-203-4557-7.
- Rituraj, Vishalakshi (2018). "e-Governance Plan: Impact and Changes". In Kumar, Puneet; Jain, Vinod Kumar; Pareek, Kumar Sambhav (eds.). The Stances of e-Government: Policies, Processes and Technologies. CRC Press. ISBN 978-1-351-39618-9. OCLC 1064971921.
- "Shri Rajesh Gera joins as Director General, National Informatics Centre (NIC)". Press Information Bureau. 1 June 2022.
