= StarCraft II StarLeague =

Esports competition

StarCraft II StarLeague (SSL)
- Logo for 2015 season.
- Sport: StarCraft II
- Founded: December 2014
- Folded: 2018
- Country: South Korea
- Continent: Asia
- Last champion: Kim "Stats" Dae Yeob
- Website: SPOTV GAMES Official Page (Korean)

The StarCraft II StarLeague, also known as SSL or S2SL in short, was a large StarCraft II tournament series hosted by SPOTV GAMES that was played offline in South Korea. The tournament series was held in parallel with the Global StarCraft II League (GSL) as qualifiers for the StarCraft World Championship Series (WCS) held yearly at BlizzCon.

== History ==
Prior to the 2015 season, the StarCraft World Championship Series only had one StarCraft II individual league in South Korea, the GSL. On October 31, 2014 Blizzard Entertainment announced changes to the WCS system and that SPOTV GAMES would be holding a second individual league that would reward players with WCS points. It was announced on January 15, 2015, that Naver, Korea's largest search engine, would sponsor the first SSL tournament. The following two tournaments in the year were sponsored by SBENU, a casual footwear company.

=== Tournaments ===
Year	Name of Tournament	Winner	Result of Final	Runner-up
2015	2015 Naver StarCraft II StarLeague Season 1	Cho "Maru" Seong Ju	4–1	Cho "Dream" Joong Hyuk
2015	2015 SBENU StarCraft II StarLeague Season 2	Kim "Classic" Doh Woo	4–1	Cho "Dream" Joong Hyuk
2015	2015 SBENU StarCraft II StarLeague Season 3	Kim "herO" Joon Ho	4–2	Han "ByuL" Ji Won
2016	2016 StarCraft II StarLeague Season 1	Park "Dark" Ryung Woo	4–2	Kim "Stats" Dae Yeob
2016	2016 StarCraft II StarLeague Season 2	Kang "Solar" Min Soo	4–3	Park "Dark" Ryung Woo
2017	2017 Jin Air StarCraft II StarLeague Season 1	Lee "INnoVation" Shin Hyung	4–1	Kang "Solar" Min Soo
2017	2017 Jin Air StarCraft II StarLeague Season 2	Kim "Stats" Dae Yeob	4–3	Park "Dark" Ryung Woo

== Format ==
=== General ===
The SSL is normally made up of two events, the Main Event, renamed in 2017 to Premier, and Challenge. The latter serves as a de facto qualifier for the former. Throughout its three-year history, the SSL has gone through multiple large format changes of both leagues.

=== 2015 ===
==== Main Event ====
In all three seasons of 2015, the 16 players in the Main Event start off divided into four groups of four. Matches are best of three in the group stage and the top two players from each group move onto the playoffs round whereas the bottom two players in each group fall down to Challenge League for the following season. Players that advance to the playoffs stay in the main event the following season. Matches in the quarterfinals are best of five and the semifinals and finals are best of seven.

==== Challenge ====
SSL Challenge is an event serving as a de facto qualifier for the main event. Players that qualify for the league and players that were eliminated early from the main event face off in a best of five match. The winners of each match move on to the main event and the losers fall out of the league and have to participate in the general qualifiers again.

=== 2016 ===
==== Main Event ====
There was no SSL Challenge in Season 1 of 2016. Instead, qualifiers seeded directly into the main event. The main event consisted of a sixteen player double elimination bracket with one round of the winners' and two of the losers' bracket being best of three matches, the next two rounds in both brackets being best of five, and the remaining four matches deciding the placement of the top four players being best of seven games.

In Season 2, the main event's format reverted to that of 2015, with a group stage and playoffs starting with best of five quarterfinals, then best of seven semifinals and finals.

==== Challenge ====
SSL Challenge returned for Season 2 of the SSL. It included 24 players in four round robin groups of six. Each match was two games long, and the top three of each group advanced to the Main Event. Each match consisted of a "home" game and an "away" game for each player. The "home" player chose the map that was played, and away wins were given more weight in how standings were determined, being deciding factors in cases where overall map wins for two players in a group were equal.

=== 2017 ===
==== Premier ====
In 2017, the SSL Main Event was renamed to SSL Premier and once again brought about large format changes to the league. Unlike 2016, though, the format remains constant between seasons. 10 players play in a large round robin of the regular season, called the Pennant Race. At the end of the Pennant Race the bottom two players are relegated to Challenge, sixth and seventh place go on to play in day one of Fast Lane, eighth place goes on to play in day two of Fast Lane, and fifth place is directly seeded into next season's Premier. The top four players advance to the playoffs, or the Post Season. In the Post Season, the third and fourth-place finishers play a best of five to advance to face the second-place finisher in a best of five. The winner of that advances to the finals to face the first-place finisher of the Pennant Race. Due to this large format change, the prize pool structure was also modified to have every match give out money, with placement only accounting for a small portion of the total prize pool of the event.

==== Challenge ====
Challenge also experienced large format changes in 2017. 10 players participate in the first stage in two five player groups with best of three matches. The top three of each group advance to the second stage, the bottom four being eliminated, where all six are in one round robin group with best of five matches. The top finisher of the second stage is seeded directly into next season's Premier. Second and third place advance to the first day of Fast Lane, fourth place advances to the second day of Fast Lane, and fifth and sixth are eliminated. Due to the extensive format changes, Challenge awards money for each match instead of overall placement.

==== Fast Lane ====
Fast Lane was added in 2017 to have the lower but not lowest finishers of Premier face the higher but not highest finishers of Challenge. It is a two-day event consisting of two four player groups. In day one, the sixth and seventh-place finishers of Premier and the second and third-place finishers of Challenge face off in a four player group. The top two advance to next season's Premier, while the bottom two continue to day two. In day two, the previous day's bottom two players are joined by the eighth-place finisher of Premier and the fourth-place finisher of Challenge. The top two once again advance to Premier, while the bottom two are relegated to next season's Challenge.

== Prize Pool ==
The prize pool for each tournament in 2015 awarded a total of 75,000,000 KRW for the main event. In addition, all players that lose in the Challenge League and do not proceed to the main event are awarded 200,000 KRW each. The prize pool for each season in 2016 awarded a total of 134,000,000 KRW for the main event. In 2017, the tournament once again underwent big format and prize pool changes.

=== 2015 Prize Pool Distribution ===
Place	Amount (KRW)
1st	40,000,000
2nd	10,000,000
3rd – 4th	4,500,000
5th – 8th	2,000,000
9th – 16th	1,000,000

- The total prize pool per SSL season in 2015 was 75,000,000 KRW.

=== 2016 Prize Pool Distribution ===
Place	Amount (KRW)
1st	40,000,000
2nd	20,000,000
3rd – 4th	9,000,000
5th – 8th	6,000,000
9th – 16th	4,000,000

- The total prize pool per SSL season in 2016 was 134,000,000 KRW.

=== 2017 Prize Pool Distribution ===
Place	Amount (KRW)
1st	10,000,000
2nd	5,000,000
3rd	2,000,000

- Additionally, due to the change in format for the event in 2017, each match in the SSL Premier Pennant Race granted 1,000,000 KRW to the participants (800,000 KRW for the winner if 2–0 victory, 700,000 KRW if 2–1), each match in SSL Challenge First Stage granted 300,000 KRW (200,000 KRW for the winner), and each match in SSL Challenge Second Stage granted 500,000 KRW (300,000 KRW for the winner).
- The total prize pool per season in 2017 was 75,500,000 KRW.

== See also ==
- Global StarCraft II League
- StarCraft World Championship Series
- StarCraft professional competition
- Electronic Sports
