= Electronic Transaction Aggregation & Analysis Layer =

Indian e-governance service

Electronic Transaction Aggregation & Analysis Layer (eTaal)

Agency overview
- Parent department: National Informatics Centre
- Website: https://etaal.gov.in/

Electronic Transaction Aggregation & Analysis Layer (eTaal) is a public service developed by India's National Informatics Centre to measure the impact of various e-governance initiatives at national and state levels.

As an indispensable analytical service, it also provides an integrated visual interface providing a real-time view of e-transactions taking place under various e-Governance applications implemented by Government, in an easily understandable visual graphic. These include Mission Mode Projects (MMPs) under National e-Governance Plan (NeGP) on the basis of transaction count shared by them in an automated manner using Web Services technology. Many tax payments are also analyzed with ETAAL at the NIC. The NIC also offers ETAAL services over the counter during normal office hours, in India.

The dashboard also facilitates quick analysis of transaction data in tabular and graphical forms enabling users to drill down to lowest level without compromising on privacy, security or integrity of the application software. Users can view consolidated e-Transaction statistics of e-Governance projects across the country and visualize their real-time utilization status. ETAAL covers all Central Ministries and State/UT governments.
