= Artosis =

American esports commentator (born 1983)

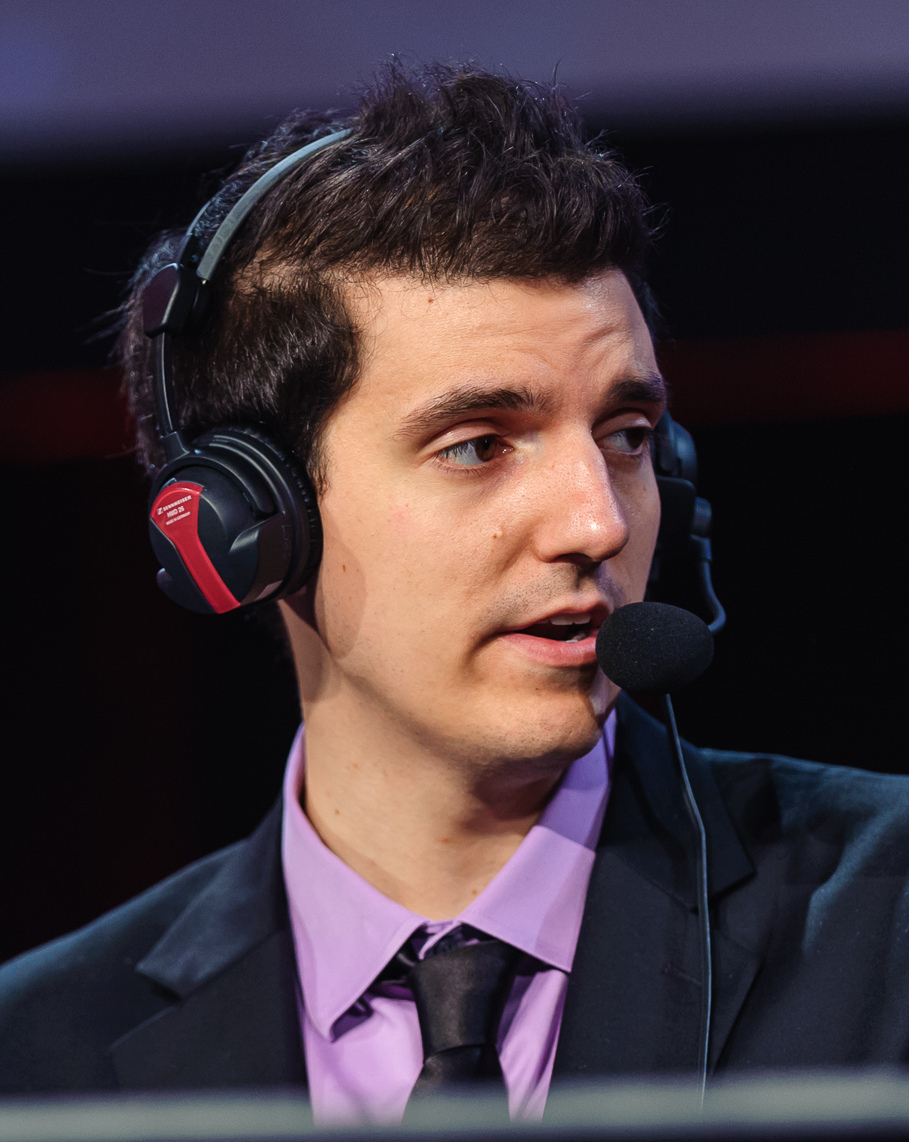
- Artosis at 2012 GSL Season 5
- Born: Daniel Stemkoski; April 6, 1983 (age 43); Salem, New Hampshire, United States
- Other name: "Artosis"
- Occupations: Esports commentator, StarCraft streamer
- Children: 4

Daniel Ray Stemkoski (born April 6, 1983), better known by his nickname Artosis, is an American professional esports commentator and Twitch streamer. Stemkoski moved to Seoul, South Korea to commentate competitive Starcraft games in English. Together with Nick "Tasteless" Plott, he provides commentary for AfreecaTV StarCraft League games (and AfreecaTV Global StarCraft II League games until 2022).

== Early life ==
Artosis was raised in Salem, New Hampshire. In his youth, his interests included skateboarding, basketball, chess tournaments, and competitive strategy games. Sports were his primary interest before he found competitive StarCraft. His consuming interest in playing and studying the game interfered with his high school education, where he failed many of his classes. He graduated from Salem High School in 2002.

== StarCraft career ==
Artosis was 14 years old when he was introduced to StarCraft at his best friend's house, where he watched his friend play. He received a copy of the game for his 15th birthday and played it casually with friends. When bedridden with a broken ankle and metal implants after a trampoline accident, he began to play StarCraft competitively. While his friends lost interest, he continued to compete over the Internet. Artosis has said that after his first year, he had spent about 1,200 hours in-game, up to 16 hours a day, and knew he could play in tournaments. As his StarCraft habits began to affect his life, his parents confiscated his dial-up modem and computer peripherals, which he circumvented with replacements. Despite his parents' requests to desist, Artosis decided in high school that he would pursue the game as a career based on the game's popularity in South Korea. At this time, he was ranked within the top three American StarCraft players. He represented North America twice at the StarCraft World Championships, and competed in the United States finals eight times.

He began a StarCraft tournament in New Hampshire, and was motivated to commentate on the matches by the dearth of English-speaking tournaments. Artosis has said that he felt like the game's community deserved more professional commentary, and decided to do it himself. His broadcasts were recorded to a computer and uploaded on the Web. Artosis was later approached by Korean broadcasting company International e-Sports Group (IEG) in 2008, and accepted their offer. He was the second Western StarCraft commentator, or caster, in South Korea, after Nick Plott.

In Korea, Artosis shared a small apartment with 15 teenage pro gamers. As StarCraft II's launch neared, Artosis and another American commentator living in Seoul, Nick "Tasteless" Plott, had individually amassed significant followings, and had the interest of commercial broadcast networks. The two began casting together and became known by a portmanteau of their nicknames, Tasteless and Artosis, as Tastosis. Before this partnership, the two knew each other through their former competitive gaming careers, but became friends in Korea. Polygon attributed their success to their "magic" dynamic from complementary personalities, with Artosis being encyclopedic and analytic, and Plott bold and sociable. In July 2013, Polygon reported Tastosis to be "the most well-known StarCraft 2 casting duo in the world", both broadcasting for GOMTV Global StarCraft II League. PC Gamer's Rich McCormick cited the pair in 2011 as examples of how the electronics sports profession is developing celebrities. The Verge's Paul Miller referred to Tastosis as "the primary practitioners of StarCraft casting". A crowdfunded documentary about their careers, Sons of StarCraft, was released in early 2013.

Artosis and Tasteless prepare separately, with Artosis constantly watching StarCraft matches and Tasteless studying commentary from non-traditional sports and major StarCraft news. Together, they incorporate team histories and their respective strategies into their commentary. Tasteless has said that he considers Tastosis's nuanced readings of player tactics and their eventualities as a "gateway" for bringing unfamiliar crowds into StarCraft.

Artosis cast alongside Tasteless at the 2012 StarCraft II World Championship Series Europe finals, Australian and Oceania finals, and UK nationals, DreamHack Winter 2011, IGN Pro League Season Two, and Major League Gaming 2012 Spring Arena, Raleigh, and 2011 Orlando. Artosis cast solo at the 2013 DreamHack Open in Stockholm.

Two in-game Easter egg characters in StarCraft II: Heart of the Swarm are named after the casters.

On his YouTube channel "ArtosisTV", he regularly uploads content related to StarCraft and StarCraft II. As of February 2026 the channel has over 147,000 subscribers. In addition, he has a secondary YouTube channel named ArtosisCasts, on which he uploads daily casts of numerous StarCraft matches that primarily involve professional players. As of February 2026 the channel has over 70,000 subscribers.

Artosis and Tasteless both cast for the AfreecaTV StarCraft League from 2016 to 2020. On 3 March 2021, it was announced by AfreecaTV that they would be discontinuing the English casts of the event. However, through Patreon support, the two were given permission to cast over VODs of the events, and have them uploaded onto the official AfreecaTV eSports YouTube channel. Additionally, Artosis cast his final GSL Code S Tournament, which had been a hallmark of Korean Starcraft II Tournaments, on October 15, 2022, after which he departed from Korea to move to Canada.

Artosis regularly streams his StarCraft gameplay on his Twitch channel. Artosis's main sources of income are from venues like Twitch subscriptions, Patreon, casting gigs, and direct donations through StreamElements, Twitch Bits, and Tangia, the majority of which are spurred by viewers of his Twitch chat paying for text-to-speech to read out usually inane things on the stream.

== Hearthstone career ==
Artosis began playing the Blizzard Entertainment online collectible card game Hearthstone: Heroes of Warcraft during its closed beta in 2013, and began publishing Hearthstone podcasts in September 2013. In November 2013 Blizzard invited Artosis to participate in the Innkeeper's Invitational, a Hearthstone tournament hosted as part of the annual BlizzCon convention. On November 8, Artosis won the tournament and was crowned "Grandmaster of the Hearth".

Artosis regularly is a caster for gaming tournaments that occasionally includes Hearthstone content, and was featured in the ESports Global Network's Fight Night Hearthstone shows, as part of Team Dogehouse and at the 2015 Seatstory Cup. He streams on Twitch.

== Personal life ==
Artosis is married and lives on Prince Edward Island with his wife and children. His wife was born on Prince Edward Island and moved to Korea around 2009. In June 2022, Artosis disclosed that the family will relocate from South Korea, where he previously lived, to Prince Edward Island, Canada. He departed Korea, where he had resided for much of his life, on October 16, 2022, after casting his final GSL Code S Tournament.

== See also ==
- StarCraft: Brood War professional competition
