= Nick Plott =

American esports commentator (born 1984)

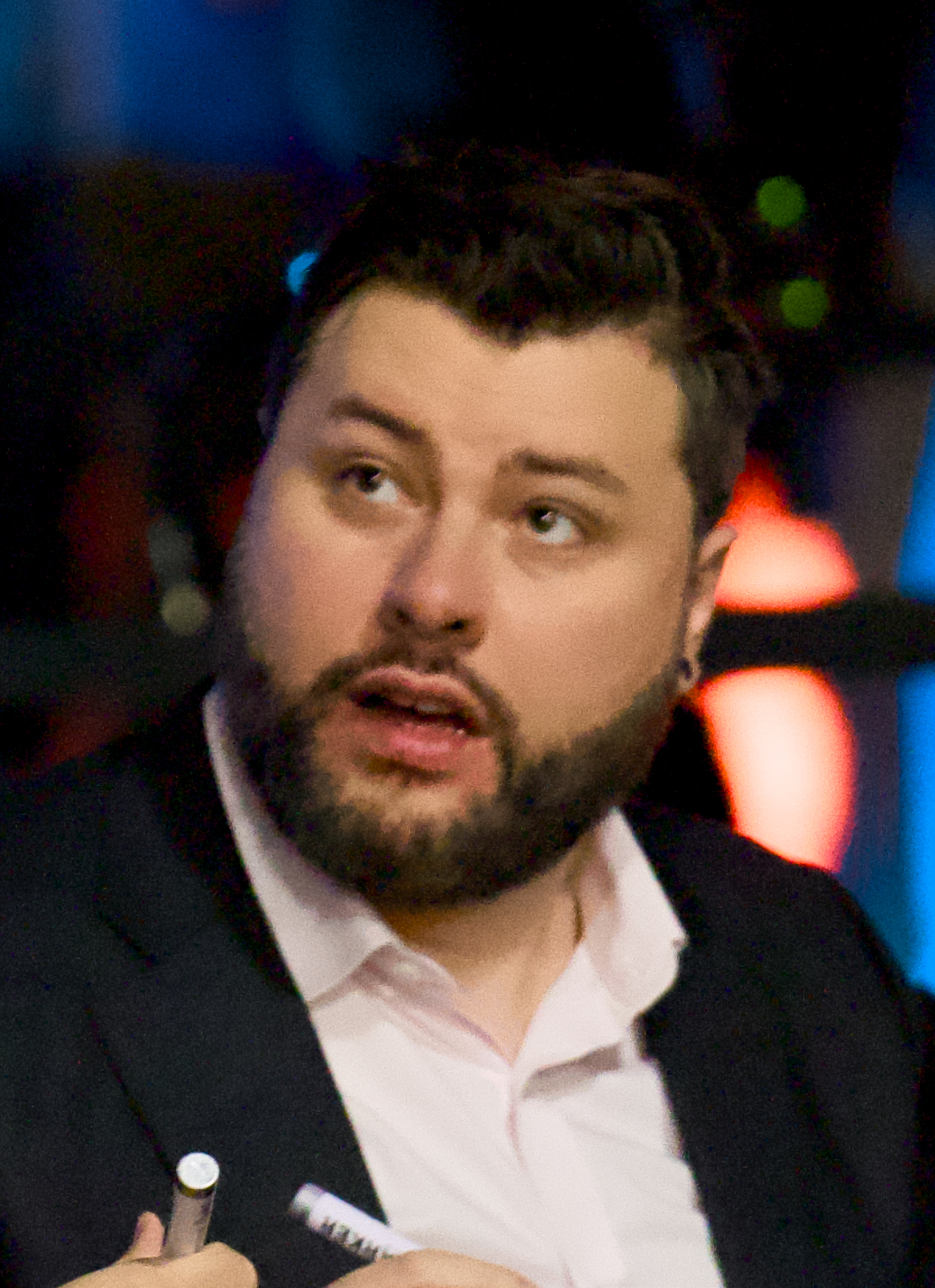
- Plott at ESL StarCraft Masters 2023 Winter
- Born: August 11, 1984 (age 42); Grenoble, France
- Other name: "Tasteless"
- Education: Regis University
- Occupation: Esports commentator
- Relatives: Sean Plott

Nicolas Plott (born August 11, 1984), known by his alias Tasteless, is an American esports commentator. He moved to Seoul, Korea in 2007 to give commentary to esports competitions. He has provided commentary for multiple Starcraft and Starcraft 2 tournaments. Together with Dan "Artosis" Stemkoski, he has provided commentary for Global StarCraft II League, and currently provides commentary for SOOP StarLeague games.

== Early life ==
Plott grew up in Kansas City, Kansas, along with his brother Sean Plott, who is also an e-sports commentator. Upon graduation from high school, he attended Regis University in Denver studying philosophy and psychology, and was a member of the parliamentary debate team. He considered law school and philosophy dual Ph.D. programs but instead pursued StarCraft full-time.

== StarCraft career ==
=== Player ===
Plott and his younger brother Sean bought a copy of StarCraft from a local video game store in 1998 after hearing about the game's popularity. The brothers would watch each other play while offering gameplay advice. They played casually online, but were hampered by a slow Internet connection. They visited a nearby Internet café where they met players about five years older who would play and beat them. This loss and the ensuing trash-talk were an early inspiration for the brothers to hone their skills, though they never returned to the café.

With the advent of high-speed Internet, the brothers played StarCraft competitively on Korean servers. They entered and won tournaments while in high school. Plott became uninterested in school when it did not let him incorporate StarCraft into his studies. He played the game through high school and college.

"My job basically entails me dissecting the game and making something that is consumable for a regular viewer, so we talk about the strategies but we try to do that without too much gamer terminology and we also try to connect with our viewers. Most of our viewers are between the ages of 15 and 32 so we try to incorporate a lot of humour with nerd culture and talk about other games - but we are basically entertainers."

— Nick Plott, 2015

=== Commentator ===
Upon losing to his brother early in the World Cyber Games 2005 finals, Plott watched the rest of the games as a spectator. He became frustrated by the tournament commentator's inexperienced handling of in-game nuances and requested to co-host the commentary, which was a success. He received offers to commentate without pay in Europe, Japan, and Singapore.

In Plott's last semester of college, Korean broadcasting company GOM TV invited him to provide English commentary for competitive Starcraft: Broodwar series as part of a strategy to extend their reach. He dropped out of college and arrived in Seoul within a week. In Korea, Plott slept on friends' couches and worked as a caster where he could. This did not guarantee a career or easy move, but offered Plott an opportunity to make a career of his StarCraft commentary and become the first Western StarCraft commentator, or caster, in South Korea in 2007. Plott provided commentary for the Star Invitational, with around 75,000 viewers for the finals, and 3 seasons of the Averatec-Intel Classic. Plot was joined by Susie 'lilsusie' Kim as co-caster for one season of the Avertec-Intel Classic. Plott first met Kim at BlizzCon in 2005.

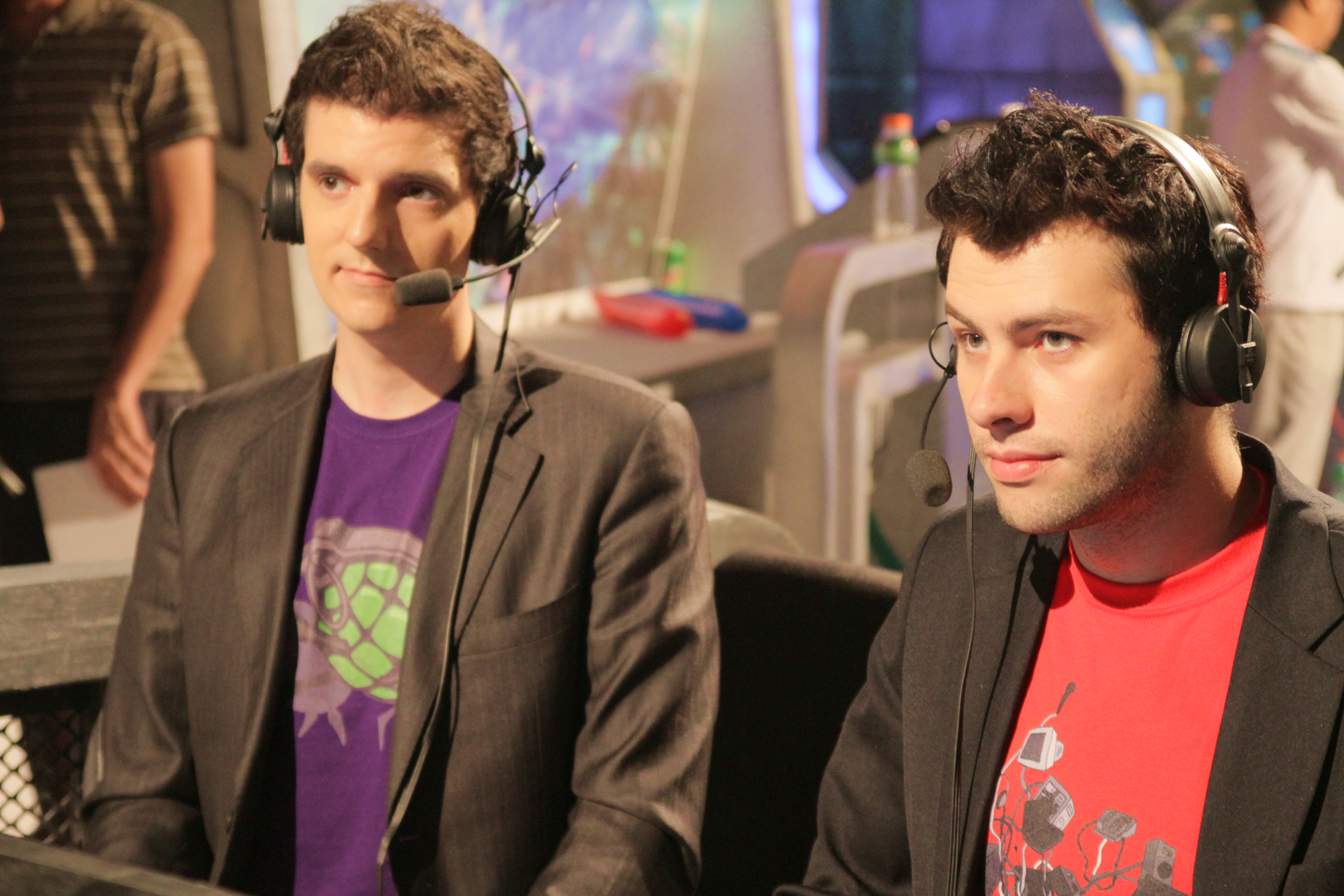
Stemkoski and Plott at a 2011 South Korean StarCraft tournament

As StarCraft II's launch neared, Plott and another American commentator living in Seoul, Dan "Artosis" Stemkoski, had individually amassed followings, and had the interest of commercial broadcast networks. The two began casting together and became known by a portmanteau of their nicknames, Tasteless and Artosis, as Tastosis. Before this partnership, the two knew each other through their former competitive gaming careers, but became friends in Korea. Polygon attributed their success to their "magic" dynamic from complementary personalities, with Plott bold and sociable, and Stemkoski encyclopedic and analytic.

A crowdfunded documentary about their careers, Sons of StarCraft, was released in 2014.

Plott and Stemkoski prepare separately, with Stemkoski constantly watching StarCraft matches and Plott studying commentary from non-traditional sports and major StarCraft news. Together, they incorporate team histories and their respective strategies into their commentary. Plott has said that he considers Tastosis' nuanced readings of player tactics and their eventualities as a "gateway" for bringing unfamiliar crowds into StarCraft. Due to the age range of their audience being 15–32, they try to incorporate humor as well.

Plott cast alongside Stemkoski at the 2012 StarCraft II World Championship Series Europe finals, Australian and Oceania finals, and UK nationals, DreamHack Winter 2011, IGN Pro League Season Two, and Major League Gaming 2012 Spring Arena, Raleigh, and 2011 Orlando. Plott was among the first group to sign to the electronics sports agency eSports Management Group in 2012.

In a StarCraft II: Heart of the Swarm Easter egg, two in-game characters are named after the casters.

In 2016, AfreecaTV brought back Starcraft: Broodwar competition with the AfreecaTV Starleague. Both Plott and Stemkoski were English commentators.

In 2017, Plott as well as his brother and Stemkoski hosted an event marking the release of Starcraft Remastered.

In an interview with the Korea Times, Plott stated: "Since I was a little kid, I always wanted to come to Korea because this is the place where the StarCraft tournaments were started."

== Personal life ==
In his free time, Tasteless regularly streams Starcraft gameplay on his Twitch Channel in which he typically plays as Protoss. As of January 2026 he has over 73,000 followers on Twitch.

Plott's mother works for Frost Giant Studios, an RTS company that produced the game Stormgate.

== See also ==
- StarCraft: Brood War professional competition
