= SBENU =

South Korean footwear, apparel and esports company

- Founded: June 30, 2014
- Founder: Hwang Hyo-Jin
- Defunct: October 7, 2016
- Headquarters: Seoul, South Korea
- Number of locations: 100+ stores (2015)
- Products: Athletic footwear & apparel
- Website: Official website

SBENU (Korean: 스베누) was an athletic footwear and apparel company based in Seoul, South Korea. Founded on 30 June 2014, SBENU had opened more than 100 retail stores nationwide by 2015. SBENU also expanded its business by becoming a major sponsor of esports in South Korea; at its peak, SBENU was the main sponsor of the BroodWar Sonic league, the League of Legends Champions Korea league, the StarLeague and the Global StarCraft II League.

== History ==
Originally established under the name Shoe Farm in 2013, SBENU was founded by Hwang Hyo-Jin. SBENU took the letter "S" for shoes and combined it with the ancient Egyptian deity Bennu, which is thought to be the inspiration for the phoenix in Greek mythology.

Focusing on building the SBENU brand globally, SBENU and football team Manchester United agreed to terms of sponsorship in 2015, making SBENU the official footwear brand of the team.

Prior to its dissolution, SBENU was sponsoring various celebrities and gaming events, spending about $8.26 million USD per year, all the while failing to pay in full to its manufacturers. In 2016, SBENU claimed that the agency "HIKE", which was run by two formerly bankrupt owners that promised to help connect manufacturers with companies, had embezzled about US$7.1 million, and that this had caused the failing of payment to the manufacturers, who should have received their money from HIKE. On 7 October 2016, SBENU announced that it would cease all sales and dissolved.

== CF models ==
- IU
- Song Jae-rim
- AOA
- Kisum

== Esports ==
=== League of Legends ===
In 2015, SBENU acquired the League of Legends roster of Prime Clan, renaming it SBENU Sonicboom before the start of SBENU Champions Summer 2015. The team performed poorly in its first season, finishing in last place and being forced to play in the LCK Promotion Series against Ever to keep their spot in the Champions League. SBENU defeated Ever 3–1 and retained their spot for the next season.

=== StarCraft II ===
SBENU was the sponsor for the season 2 and season 3 tournaments of the StarCraft II StarLeague.
