= StarCraft in esports =

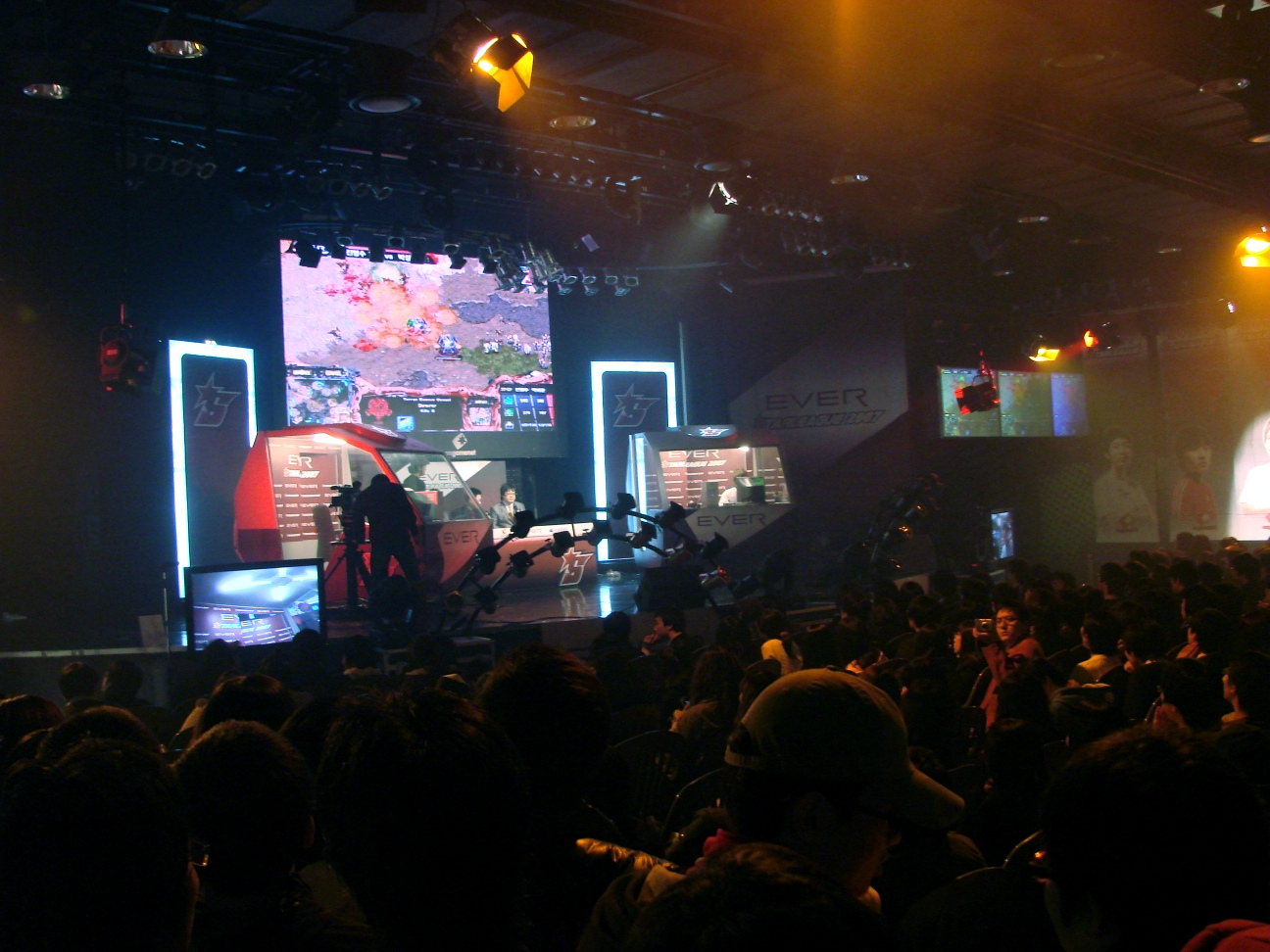
OGN's Yongsan e-Sports Stadium is an example of an esports stadium, where professional StarCraft is played.

The real-time strategy (RTS) computer game StarCraft has an active professional competition circuit, particularly in South Korea. Historically, the two major gaming television networks in South Korea, Ongamenet and MBCGame, each ran a Starleague (Ongamenet Starleague, MBCgame Starleague), viewed by millions of fans.

Starting in about 2003, pro-gamers started to become organized into teams, sponsored by large South Korean companies like Samsung, SK Telecom and KT. StarCraft is also the most popular computer game competition during the annual World Cyber Games thanks to its Korean fanbase, and it is overall one of the world's largest computer and video game competitions in terms of prize money, global coverage and participants.

Over US$7,500,000 in prize money has been awarded in total across 542 tournaments, the vast majority of which comes from tournaments in South Korea. For several years after the release of StarCraft II, competitive StarCraft: Brood War was no longer televised. However, in early 2015, exhibition matches featuring former professional and amateur players (the Sbenu StarLeague) began airing on Ongamenet, though this was not an official revival of the StarLeague. The game's professional competition has remained largely separate from that of StarCraft II, though both games' current largest Korean competitions, the Afreeca StarCraft League (ASL) and Global StarCraft II League (GSL), are organized by Afreeca TV. Players have transitioned between the two throughout the years, but outside of the transitional 2012 season of Proleague, none have competed professionally in both at the same time.

== Participation outside of South Korea ==
There have been several commercial attempts to bring televised professional StarCraft matches to audiences outside South Korea. GOM TV hired Nick "Tasteless" Plott, an American who previously cast StarCraft at the WCG and other international events, to provide English commentary for the 2008 GOM TV Star Invitational and the 2008 Averatec-Intel Classic tournaments. According to GOM TV statistics, over 1 million viewers watched the GOM TV Star Invitational matches with English commentary. Many StarCraft fans outside South Korea download video files of the pro games to watch on their computer. This has spawned a small community wherein StarCraft fans post the files to video sharing sites such as YouTube, but with their own English commentaries dubbed alongside the original Korean commentary. Notable English-speaking YouTube commentators include Tasteless's brother Sean "Day9" Plott, KlazartSC, Diggity, Moletrap, NukeTheStars, and Rise.

The Collegiate Starleague is a seasonal intercollegiate league that is modeled after Korea's ProLeague. It was founded in 2009 by students at Princeton University. Its fourth season (Fall 2010) marks a shift from StarCraft: Brood War to StarCraft II: Wings of Liberty, and includes the participation of over 100 North American colleges including Harvard University, Yale University, Cornell University, Massachusetts Institute of Technology, Rutgers University, and Case Western Reserve University. Notable contributors and players include Day9, Kevin "QXC" Riley, and Andre "Gretorp" Hengchua.

== List of professional StarCraft teams ==
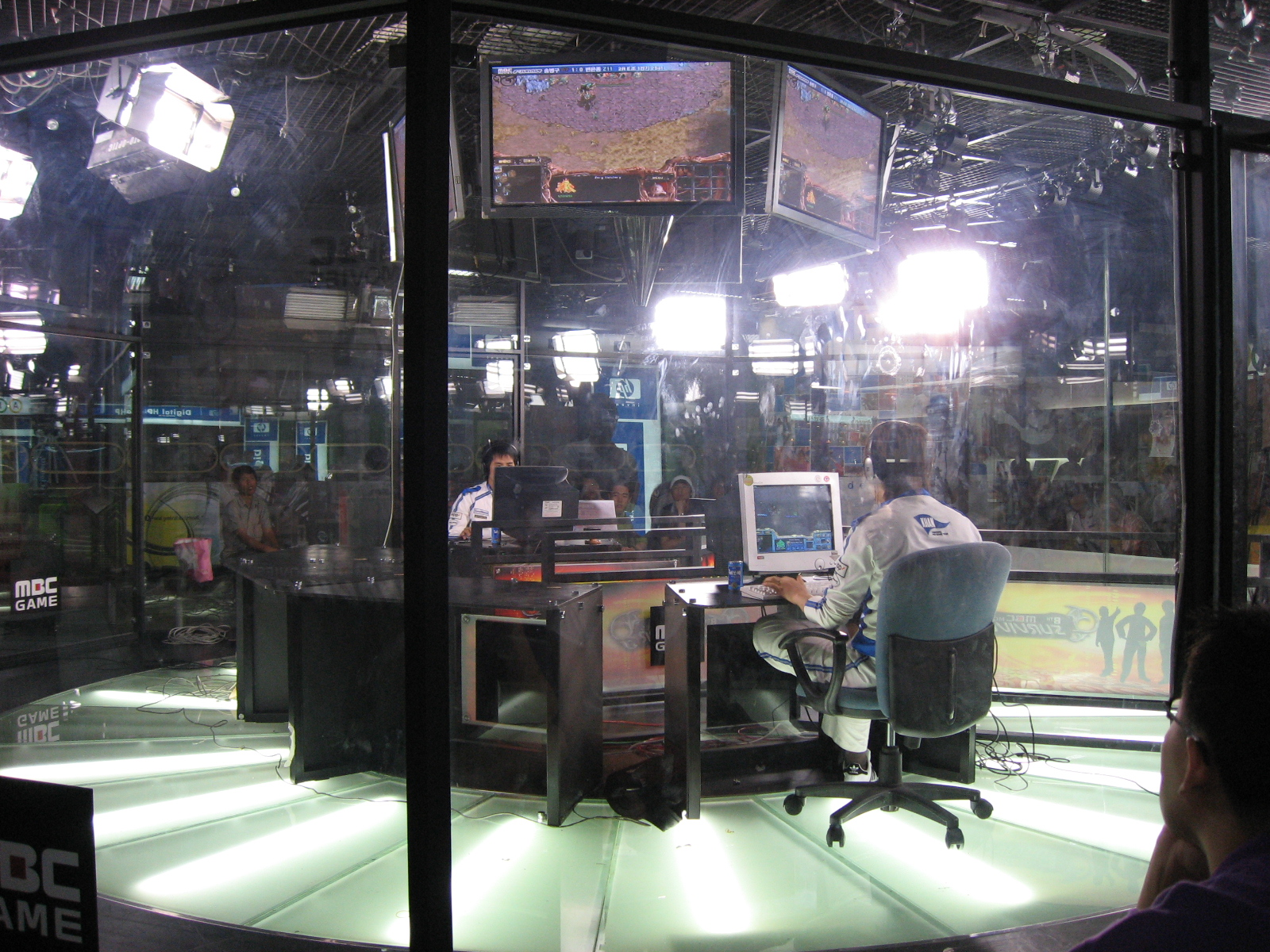
StarCraft match televised on MBCGame

The Korean professional scene was divided into eight teams, six of which were sponsored by corporations, and the remaining team by the Korean Air Force. All teams dissolved or transitioned to StarCraft II in 2012.

- Air Force ACE (공군 에이스)
- CJ ENTUS (CJ 엔투스) – formerly Hite Entus, Suma GO (Greatest Ones) and Hite Sparkyz, OnGameNet Sparkyz, KOR
- Woongjin Stars (웅진 스타즈) – formerly Hanbit Stars
- KT Rolster (KT롤스터) – formerly KT Fingerboom, KT MagicNs, KTF MagicNs
- Samsung KHAN (삼성전자 칸)
- SK Telecom T1 (SK텔레콤 T1) – formerly 4U, Orion
- SouL (소울) – formerly STX SouL
- Jin Air Green Wings (진에어 그린 윙즈) – formerly the eighth team; was managed by KeSPA through proxy, in response to OZ, MBCGame HERO, and WeMadeFOX ending their teams.

As a result of the match-fixing scandal all teams except for Jin air green wings has disbanded.

== Match fixing scandal ==
A cheating scandal in the sport came to light in South Korea on 13 April 2010, when it was found that popular StarCraft players were intentionally losing games. As professional gaming has a legal status in South Korea, the consequences of these actions was severe: 11 players were banned from all professional StarCraft competition for life, and faced civil and criminal lawsuits. All eleven players had all prizes and rewards revoked (e.g. Player of the Year Reward, Proleague Player Reward, Weekly/Monthly MVP Reward)

As of 9 June 2010, eleven Players have been banned from pro gaming as a result of the scandal: sAviOr, Hwasin, go.go, Type-b, Luxury, YellOw (ArnC)*, DarkElf, UpMaGiC, Justin, By.1st and ShinHwA. In October 2010, sentences were declared.

*Note: not to be confused with Hong "YellOw" Jin Ho, who played for KT Rolster—the involved player's full name is Park "Yellow[ArnC]" Myung Soo, who played for Hite SPARKYZ.

Charges:

- Pro gamer (T) Justin – 18-month sentence, 3-year suspended sentence, 3 million won fine, 120 hours of community service, 40 hours of gambling treatment program.
- Pro gamer (Z) sAviOr – 1-year sentence, 2-year suspended sentence, 120 hours of community service.
- Ex Progamer (T) By 1st – 6-month sentence, 1-year suspended sentence, 40 hours of gambling treatment program
- Ex Progamer (Z) ShinHwA – 6-month sentence, 1-year suspended sentence, 40 hours of gambling treatment program

The suspended sentences mean the players can avoid prison if no wrongdoing is committed within the time period.

== Transition to StarCraft II: Wings of Liberty ==
Despite the release of StarCraft II: Wings of Liberty, KeSPA, OGN and MBC Game decided to stick with Brood War for their competitions. KeSPA and OGN eventually came into talks with Blizzard and GomTV for broadcasting rights of StarCraft II. After discussions and negotiations were complete, it was announced that the SK Planet Proleague season would be a hybrid tournament featuring both Brood War and StarCraft II. Brood War professional competition was eventually phased out entirely in Proleague, although fan interest in the game continued.

== Resurgence and StarCraft: Remastered ==
Brood War tournaments with cash prizes continued to be run following KeSPA's exit from the scene. In 2014, two years after professional KeSPA-sanctioned StarCraft competition ended, OGN once again televised StarCraft competition for two seasons. Starting in 2016, Afreeca TV began running the Afreeca StarCraft League (ASL) alongside their StarCraft II event, the Global StarCraft II League (GSL). In 2017, Blizzard announced StarCraft: Remastered, a graphical and systems update to StarCraft: Brood War that left the gameplay completely untouched. Following the release of StarCraft: Remastered, the scene had no trouble transitioning as the game remained exactly the same in terms of gameplay and only had its graphics and matchmaking improved, which didn't affect professional players. In 2018, coinciding with StarCraft's 20th anniversary, Blizzard announced their own league, the Korea StarCraft League (KSL), bringing the number of professional individual leagues for StarCraft: Brood War, now StarCraft: Remastered, in Korea back to two for the first time since 2011 when the last season of MSL was played.

== Notable professional players ==
=== Terran ===
==== Lim Yo-Hwan (SlayerS_`BoxeR`) ====
Known as the "Emperor of Terran", or sometimes just "The Emperor", Boxer's creative play helped him to be the first (of two) StarCraft player to win the World Cyber Games (WCG) twice. He has also won the Ongamenet Starleague (OSL) twice (only eight other players have achieved that). He is the first of three players to win two consecutive OSLs. He holds the record for being number 1 in KeSPA's rankings for 17 consecutive months. Boxer made a comeback in 2005, winning second place in the So1 OSL 2005, but had to retire from professional gaming to join the Korean military service, which is mandatory for all Korean males. On 3 October 2006 he played his rival [NC]...Yellow in "Superfight", which he won 3–2. One of the most popular fights with [NC]Yellow was Boxer's Famous SCV rush, where he sent his SCV's and a couple of marines and won in five minutes. His total record of televised matches before he joined the Korean Air Force was 500 wins and 338 losses.

Boxer became one of the first members of the Korean Air Force pro-gaming team ACE (an acronym of Air Force Challenges E-sports), where he continued playing as a pro-gamer. He made the GomTV 2 MBC Game Starleague in 2007, but was eliminated in the group stages. When his air force contract expired on 24 December 2008, he rejoined his former team SK Telecom T1, appearing actively in Pro League in July 2009. In October 2010 he switched over to StarCraft II and competed in GomTV GSL 2. In November 2010 he retired from his KeSPA pro-gamer status to only focus on SC2 and have the opportunity to form a new SC2-team sponsored by Intel.

==== Lee Yun-Yeol ([ReD]NaDa) ====
The "Genius Terran" (also known as "Tornado Terran") started his pro-gaming career by beating ChRh (Choi In Kyu) on the "Amateur vs Pro" TV show. He has a consistent and dominating style, backed up with excellent macro. A strong micro among all StarCraft players (e.g. Nada's Vultures), Nada's infantry army had good performance. He has been on the team IS, KTF and now the Wemade FOX, formerly Pantech EX, formerly known as Toona SG. Nada has won 3 OSLs, 3 MSLs, and the first KT-KTF invitational tournament. After a resurgent OSL victory in late 2006, NaDa became the first player to have won the OSL three times, winning the "Golden Mouse". He recently qualified for his tenth MSL, but failed to qualify for the next OSL. Nada managed to reach the final sixteen in both the 2008 MSL and OSL, but was stifled of another attempt at a trophy by Hwasin and Jangbi respectively. As of December 2008 he is ranked 18 in KeSPA. As of June 2009, Nada has fallen to rank 31 in the KeSPA ranking system, making it the first time that he has been out of the top 30 since March 2002.

In October 2010 after his contract ended, he retired from playing StarCraft: Brood War professionally instead NaDa is currently pursuing a professional gaming career in StarCraft II: Wings of Liberty. NaDa joined the StarCraft II team, Complexity Gaming, but announced his retirement in June 2012 due to financial difficulty, current poor state of health pending military issues, and various family issues.

==== Choi Yeon-Sung (iloveoov) ====
The next successful Terran player after Boxer and Nada, iloveoov's macro is even better than Nada's, leading to him being known as the "Cheater Terran" due to his ability to create large armies in a short span of time. He is also known as "Monster" because of his dominance over his opponents. He has won the MBCGame Starleague (MSL) three times in succession, and in November 2004 finally won the OSL. He won his 2nd OSL title in March 2006, defeating JulyZerg in the 1st ShinHan Bank tournament. iloveoov has now retired from professional gaming and is currently a coach for the SKT1 squad with Kingdom. However, in November 2008, he declared he would come back to the squad and works as coach in SKT. His first coming back game was held 17 November. He played against Kim Myung Un (Zerg) and lost, himself using Valiath (Valkyrie+Goliath). He has a relationship with Boxer (who was on the same SK Telecom T1 team with him), as he sees Boxer as a kind of "older brother" or mentor (Boxer brought iloveoov to the professional scene after seeing his talent in amateur leagues), and as a result, was somewhat regretful for beating him (3–2) in the finals of the EVER OSL in November 2004. He also won the WCG in 2006, beating Julyzerg 2–1 in the finals.

==== Lee Young-Ho (Flash) ====
Nicknamed "The Little Monster", "God-Young-Ho", and "Ultimate Weapon", Flash arrived in the gaming scene by defeating Bisu in a Starleague game by "cheesing" his opponent. He was heavily criticized by StarCraft fans as a "cheap" player, but he dispelled all accusations by dominating the StarCraft gaming scene. He propelled his team KTF (now KT Rolster) into Proleague victories and championships by winning the 2010 Proleague. Flash is involved in a rivalry with Jaedong. Flash holds world records such as longest TvT winning streak, longest TvP winning streak, youngest Starleague winner, youngest Golden Mouse winner, highest KeSPA rank of all time, and the highest overall Elo, TvP, TvZ and TvT ranks of all time. He has been in three consecutive dual Starleague finals, winning four golds within the past year. He defeated Kal (Goojila) in the 2010 World Cyber Games, eventually becoming the world champion. He also came back in 2017 and won the ASL season 2, defeating sea in a series of 3–1. He had to beat Jaedong in the semi-finals and it went to the 5th game, which he eventually won 3–2.

=== Zerg ===
==== Hong Jin-ho (YellOw) ====
Hong Jin Ho known as "Storm Zerg" was an early rival to Lim Yo-Hwan (Boxer), losing several Starleague finals to him. Hong is known for his aggressive and harassing style of play, and for his rivalry with BoxeR. Hong never won first place in major StarCraft tournaments despite his strong performance. Hong managed to finish second place six times in the events, never once attaining a major championship, which earned him the title "King of Silver." While there are some tournaments in which he finished first, these records was invalidated when the KeSPA announced to accept only OSL and MSL records. His notable victories include first place in the 2003 ITV 5th Starleague, the Snickers All-Star league in 2005 and the first BlizzCon invitational tournament.

Hong suffered his last major defeat against Han "Casy" Dong-wook in the semi-finals of the Shinhan Bank Season 1 OSL in 2006, and claimed 3rd place. Due to poor performance in the following OSL, Hong had fallen into a slump from which he has not recovered. Hong reached the round of 32 in the GOMTV Averatech Classic, but was eliminated by oDin (Joo Young-Dal). He is now in the Korean Air Force since November 2008, and has enlisted in the StarCraft team Air Force ACE. After being a member of KAF ACE, Hong is recovering his form. The trigger was an old-fashioned 'storm-like' victory against Bisu[Shield] on 20 June 2009 in Shinhan Bank ProLeague 08–09, after 735 days of silence. He could not qualify for either OSL nor MSL since Shinhan Bank OSL season 2 in 2006, but in the end of Shinhan Bank ProLeague 09–10 season, Hong ended the season securing a 3-game winning streak, including a dramatic victory against Jaedong.

Hong announced his retirement from professional gaming on his website on 16 June 2011. At his retirement ceremony, BoxeR jokingly handed him an empty StarCraft II box. BoxeR said that the box was empty, but the account was at the Slayers clan house and if Hong ever considered transitioning into StarCraft II, he knew where to go. As of August 2011 he is appearing in a reality series entitled "Project A" on GOMtv. The series follows Hong as he attempts to qualify for the GOMTV Global StarCraft II League and relaunch his programing career in StarCraft II.

==== Ma Jae-Yoon (sAviOr[gm]) ====
sAviOr (previously known as IPXZerg) has won three MSLs and one OSL, and reached five consecutive MSL finals during the height of his dominance. Nicknamed "Maestro" for his play, timing, and game sense, he is viewed as a strong Zerg, having defeated BoxeR, iloveoov, NaDa, Midas, Nal_rA and many other top players. He is well known for his perfect defiler usage, particularly in the ZvT matchup. sAviOr made the semifinals of the 2007 September–November GOM TV MSL but was surprisingly eliminated by Terran player Mind 2–3. Soon after, he was eliminated 1–2 by Bisu in the 2007 Ever OSL quarterfinals. sAviOr is currently in a competitive slump, having been eliminated from the first round of both the most recent OSL and MSL. However, he has since qualified for the next upcoming MSL and is currently ranked 53rd in the February 2010 KeSPA ranking. On 13 April 2010, he was implicated in a cheating scandal involving several Korean pro gamers, illegal betting websites, and allegations of games being deliberately lost. As the investigation continued, Savior admitted his guilt on 20 May, and was forced into retirement by KeSPA.

==== Lee Jae-Dong (n.Die_Jaedong) ====
Known as the "Lord of Destruction", and the "Tyrant", Jaedong was Team 8's ace player. He took down many top players when he first entered the scene, earning the nickname "Legend Killer". He is known for his intense and focused demeanor during play and his tendency to excel under pressure. He is known for his micro of mutalisks, his trademark unit. His ZvT and ZvZ are among the best in the progaming scene, and he is regarded as the best Zerg player, if not the best player overall. He walked the Royal Road by qualifying for the OSL for the first time and defeating Stork in the EVER OSL finals 3–1. Soon thereafter, he proved that his ZvP matchup was strong by defeating Bisu in the GOMTV MSL S4 group stages. Since his OSL win, Jaedong's ZvP has statistically been his second strongest matchup (71.25%) Jaedong has also won the MSL season 4 by defeating Siz) Kal 3–1 in March 2008, further proving himself as the top Zerg on the scene. Jaedong set a new record for the highest ZvZ streak by winning 12 games straight, only losing to Oversky in the Proleague.

As of June 2009, he is 72–19 (79.12%) in ZvZ, and considering that ZvZ is thought to be one of the most volatile and luck based matchups, this is a feat. In July 2008, he was defeated in the Arena MSL 2008 Finals 0–3 by his teammate Park Ji-Su (ForGG), but he was able to defeat his rival Flash 3–0 in the TG Sambo Intel Classic finals. He has won his second OSL title against Fantasy in the Batoo OSL 2009. In the Summer 2009 StarCraft season, he was the only player to make the quarterfinals of every Starleague: GOMTV Avertec Classic, OSL, and MSL. He also carried his team through the Shinhan Bank 08-09 Proleague and brought them a second-place finish. On 22 August 2009 he won the Bacchus OSL (his third OSL title) and won the Golden Mouse. Jaedong was ranked first in the February 2010 KeSPA rankings. Jaedong has also been a very popular person outside of StarCraft having done commercials for various Korean companies and attending several international competitions such as the World Cyber Games two years in a row (2008–2009) and is the WCG champion for 2009, after beating his fellow Korean, Stork in the finals. In 2012, Jaedong left Team 8 and joined North American based organisation Evil Geniuses on a one-year contract, in order to compete in the first SC2 Proleague season.

==== Park Sung-Joon (JulyZerg) ====
JulyZerg (or simply "July"), the "God of War", was credited with revitalizing what had been stagnant Zerg play, and of leading the way for a kind of "Zerg renaissance" with his highly dynamic and aggressive style, incorporating a strong understanding of his opponent's weaknesses and immaculate unit control. He is the first Zerg player to win an OSL; having accomplished this feat in 2004, and he also won the second KT-KTF Premiere League. In July 2005 he won a second OSL, something that to that date only four other players have accomplished, and after a long slump managed to win the Ever OSL 2008, making him the second player and first zerg to win three OSL titles and claiming the Golden Mouse trophy. July is known for being closer to the amateur community than the typical professional player, having played in amateur leagues such as the WGTour Speed Ladder in the past, and was one of the players on the Asian team for the friendly Blizzard Invitational Tournament held in early 2005. JulyZerg is currently playing StarCraft II on the pro team ST, but is serving in the military until 2014.

=== Protoss ===
==== Park Jung Suk ([Oops]Reach) ====
Reach, nicknamed "MAN-TOSS" (due to his muscular build and brute strategies) or "Hero Protoss", is the Protoss player who has been most consistent in the long term, beating Boxer in an OSL final near the height of his dominance, and placing well in tournaments. He is known for his standard/solid/safe style of play, with flawless macro and use of Psi Storm (the latter of which earned him the other nickname "Mudang Protoss", meaning shaman Protoss in Korean, owing to the uncanny accuracy of his Psionic Storm use), although he has been leaning away from this slightly due to changes in the playing style of the other races. Reach is known for his PvP and PvT skills, with his PvZ being strong. Park was the captain of the KTF progaming team. Reach has been absent from the Starleagues and KeSPA rankings for 18 months but has recently returned to StarCraft pro-gaming tournaments, qualifying for the 2007 Season 1 OSL. Reach has slumped since his return and is currently enlisted with Yellow in Air Force ACE. Reach has shown some return to form with impressive victories in the ProLeague. Since his retirement from professional Brood War he became coach of the Najin Corporation League of Legends teams.

==== Kang Min (Nal_rA) ====
The 'Dreaming Protoss' is often considered to be a Protoss version of Boxer due to his creative and daring play. He frequently hides his buildings in other parts of the map and pioneered and standardized several notable Protoss strategies such as fast expanding and using corsairs and reavers in tandem against Zerg. He won an OSL and MSL in the same season and does well in team tournaments, playing for KTF. He has won the Blizzard WorldWide Invitational tournament during early 2006. He has recently recovered from a severe slump; and qualified for ShinHan Bank 2 OSL and made it to the Pringles MSL finals by defeating Kingdom, but lost 3–1 to sAviOr. He also made it to the Semi-Finals of the subsequent Pringles 2 MSL, only to lose again at the hands of sAviOr. Nal_rA has retired from progaming and is a broadcaster for OnGameNet. In 2009, it was announced that Nal_rA would retire from commentating and that he would pursue a career in teaching at Seoul Institute of the Arts.

==== Kim Taek-Yong (Bisu[Shield]) ====
Bisu (meaning "assassin's dagger" in Korean), nicknamed "Ninja Toss" for his creative Dark Templar use, plays at the highest level of progaming. He had moderate success in Shinhan OSL 2 where he made it to the Sweet 16 playoff round. Bisu rose to prominence when he unexpectedly defeated sAviOr 3–0 in the March 2007 GOM MSL final at the height of Savior's dominance. Bisu is also known as the "Revolutionist" for his strong PvZ, and changing how Protoss players play the matchup. He also recently won the July 2007 GOM MSL 2 by defeating Stork 3–2. Bisu is the first Protoss player to reach the top spot in KeSPA history. Bisu lost 1–3 to Mind in the finals of the September GOM MSL 3 and was eliminated by Stork in the semifinals of the EVER OSL. Bisu was eliminated in the group stages of GOM MSL 4, losing most notably to Jaedong. However, he made it to the semifinals of the Bacchus OSL, but was eliminated by Flash.

Bisu regained his dominant form by defeating free in ClubDay MSL semifinal, and defeated Jangbi in final to win his 3rd MSL title, the first and only Protoss to achieve this feat. For the first time in StarCraft progaming history, two opponents faced in a final back to back, once again, Bisu defeated Jangbi 3–1 in the GOM Averatec-Intel Classic Season 2 tournament. Inexplicably, his performance in OSL did not yield him any championships which is the only knock on his career so far. Bisu is known for his plays against zerg having popularized the forge fast expand and the Bisu build. He is currently ranked 2nd in the August 2009 Kespa rankings and is considered to be the best protoss in history. His team SKT1 also won their second proleague grand finals with Bisu being the ace player of their team having won the most matches for them and having the best win–loss ratio in the entire tournament. Unfortunately, he has been slumping for a long time and has one of the lowest Elo ratings among the top players of each race.

==== Song Byung-Gu (Stork[gm]) ====
Stork, nicknamed 'The Faultless Supreme Commander' for his all-round ability against all (vs protoss 60.8%, vs zerg 53.9%, vs terran 66%), is one of the highest pro-gamers, 'Taek-Bang-LeeSSang'. His debut was 2004, and now he is the oldest programmer in active. He was focused when he won CYON 2004 challenge league, and got 4th rank of EVER starleague 2005. However he couldn't get contentable grade. After his frustration, he didn't give up, and finally he made victory of Samsung KHAN in 2007, 2008. At that time, he became the finalist of EVER starleague 2007 and 2007 Bacchus starleague, but he was lost by Flash, and Jaedong. His career was wonderful, but only second place, and it made him called as 'Kong-Line (successor of Yellow, Hong Jin-Ho)'. However, finally he got the win at Incruit starleague and he was the legend of fall (This is the Legend of protoss who won the Starleague at fall. First is Park Jung-suk (DAUM OSL 2002), and continued by Oh Yeong-jong (So1 OSL 2005), Song Byung-Gu (Incruit OSL 2008), and Hu Young-Moo (Jin-air OSL 2011). In 2008, he also won the WCG2007 Grand-Final, against Sha Junchun, China).

In 2009, he became the finalist of many contests such as WCG, IEF. And because of this career, he got the other nickname, 'Song Sun-sin (compound of Song(Last name) and Lee Sun-sin (the greatest general of Japanese invasion of Korea in 1592). He continues to go through to round of 16 of OSL for 17th and 13th in a row (2007 DAUM (3rd)-EVER (2nd) -2008 bacchus (2nd) -EVER (round of 16) -Incruit (1st) -2009 Batoo (round of 8)-bacchus (round of 16) -EVER (round of 8) -2010 Korean Air S1 (round of 16) -Korean Air S2 (3rd) -2011 Bacchus (2nd) -Jin air(round of 16) -2012 OSL (con). He set many records-the most fanalist among Protoss of Private starleague (5th), the most participant for round of 16 (27th), the most successive victories against terran (12th), the first reverse-all-kill (got four victories in one game) among protoss, etc. He is the captain and also ACE of Samsung Khan.

==== Others ====
- Guillaume Patry (a.k.a. Grrrr...), a French-Canadian former pro gamer, won the first Starleague. He is the only non-Korean Starleague winner.
- Kim Dong-Soo (a.k.a. Garimto) won the OnGameNet Starleague twice before entering military service.

== History of pro-level tournament winners ==
The two most prestigious and lucrative series of tournaments were the Ongamenet Starleague and MBCgame Starleague.

The following winners are all listed from oldest to most recent. Note that many of the Starleagues are named after the corporate sponsor for that year and that the other finalists are given in descending order of their finish. P/T/Z after a player's name indicates whether they played Protoss, Terran or Zerg, respectively. The players are from South Korea except when noted.

=== Winners of the Ongamenet Starleague ===
- Freemura (Z) over TheBoy, Ssamjang (99 Progamer Korea Open)
- Grrrr... (P) (Canada) over H.O.T-Forever (Hanaro Communication Tooniverse Starleague )
- GARIMTO (P) over Skelton (Freechal 2000)
- BoxeR (T) over JinNam, Grrrr... (Canada), Kingdom (Hanbitsoft April – June 2001)
- BoxeR (T) over YellOw, V-Gundam, Tis)Isaac (Coca-Cola July – September 2001)
- GARIMTO (P) over BoxeR, TheMarine, YellOw (Sky 2001 October – December 2001)
- Sync (T) over H.O.T. Forever, ChRh, Oddysay (NATE April – June 2002)
- Reach (P) over BoxeR, YellOw, ElkY (France) (Sky 2002 July – October 2002)
- NaDa (T) over ChOJJa, YellOw, Junwi (Panasonic November 2002 – February 2003)
- XellOs (T) over YellOw, BoxeR, Junwi (Olympus April – June 2003)
- Kingdom (P) over Nal_rA, Junwi, Reach (MyCube August – October 2003)
- Nal_rA (P) over ZeuS, Silent_Control, JJu (NHN Hangame December 2003 – March 2004)
- July (Z) over Reach, iloveoov, Silent_Control (Gillette April – July 2004)
- iloveoov (T) over BoxeR, Reach, YellOw (2004 Ever August – November 2004)
- NaDa (T) over July, GoRush, GooDFriend (IOPS December 2004 – March 2005)
- July (Z) over GooDFriend, XellOs, GoRush (2005 Ever May 2005 – July 2005)
- Anytime (P) over BoxeR, iloveoov, PuSan (So1 August 2005 – November 2005)
- iloveoov (T) over July, PuSan, Casy (2005 Shinhan December 2005 – March 2006)
- Casy (T) over ChOJJa, YellOw, JJu (2006 Shinhan 1 April 2006 – June 2006)
- NaDa (T) over Anytime, Midas, Goodfriend (2006 Shinhan 2 September 2006 – November 2006)
- ~~sAviOr~~ (Z) over NaDa, Iris, Casy (2006 Shinhan 3 December 2006 – February 2007)
- GGPlay (Z) over Iris, Stork, Flash (Daum May 2007 – July 2007)
- Jaedong (Z) over Stork, Bisu, UpMagic (Ever October 2007 – December 2007)
- Flash (T) over Stork, Bisu, Luxury (Bacchus January 2008 – March 2008)
- July (Z) over BeSt, BackHo, Luxury (Ever April 2008 – July 2008)
- Stork (P) over Fantasy, BeSt, GGPlay (Incruit August 2008 – November 2008)
- Jaedong (Z) over Fantasy, by.herO, Bisu (Batoo December 2008 – April 2009)
- Jaedong (Z) over YellOw[ArnC], Fantasy, type-b (Bacchus May 2009 – August 2009)
- Flash (T) over Movie, Calm, Shine (Ever October 2009 – January 2010)
- EffOrt (Z) over Flash, Kal, Pure (Korean Air 1 February 2010 – May 2010)
- Flash (T) over Jaedong, Free, Stork (Korean Air 2 June 2010 – September 2010)
- Fantasy (T) over Stork, Calm, Modesty (Bacchus November 2010 – January 2011)
- Jangbi (P) over Fantasy, n.Die_Soo, Hydra (Jinair July 2011 – September 2011)
- Jangbi (P) over Fantasy, Flash, Zero (TVing May 2012 – August 2012)

=== Winners of the MBC Starleague ===
- Boxer (T) over YellOw, IntoTheRain, ChRh (KPGA 1st Tour)
- NaDa (T) over YellOw, Black, ChOJJa (KPGA 2nd Tour)
- NaDa (T) over Reach, BoxeR, ChRh (KPGA 3rd Tour)
- NaDa (T) over ChOJJa, kOs, JinNam (KPGA 4th Tour)
- Nal_rA (P) over NaDa, Zeus, ChOJJa (Stout May 2003 – August 2003)
- iloveoov (T) over YellOw, NaDa, GooDFriend (TriGem September 2003 – November 2003)
- iloveoov (T) over NaDa, TheMarine, Nal_rA (HanaFOS January 2004 – March 2004)
- iloveoov (T) over Kingdom, Nal_rA, GooDFriend (Spris May 2004 – August 2004)
- GoRush (Z) over NaDa, XellOs, ChOJJa (You're the GolfKing July 2004 – February 2005)
- ~~sAviOr~~ (Z) over Reach, ChOJJa, iloveoov (UZOO April 2005 – August 2005)
- ChOjJJa (Z) over ~~sAviOr~~, iloveoov, MuMyung (Cyon October 2005 – January 2006)
- ~~sAviOr~~ (Z) over Nal_rA, Kingdom, Midas (Pringles I May 2006 – July 2006)
- ~~sAviOr~~ (Z) over SiLvEr, Nal_rA, JJu (Pringles II August 2006 – November 2006)
- Bisu (P) over sAviOr, Nal_rA, HwaSin (GOM TV I December 2006 – March 2007)
- Bisu (P) over Stork, GoRush, Firebathero (GOM TV II April 2007 – July 2007)
- Mind (T) over Bisu, sAviOr, Xellos (GOM TV III September 2007 – November 2007)
- Jaedong (Z) over Kal, Mind, Jangbi (GOM TV IV January 2008 – March 2008)
- fOrGG (T) over Jaedong, FlaSh, Much (Arena April 2008 – July 2008)
- Bisu (P) over JangBi, Kal, Free (Club Day September 2008 – November 2008)
- Luxury (Z) over JangBi, Zero, Stork (Lost Saga January 2009 – March 2009)
- Calm (Z) over Kwanro, Jaedong, Iris (Avalon June 2009 – August 2009)
- Jaedong (Z) over Flash, Kal, Kwanro (NATE November 2009 – January 2010)
- Flash (T) over Jaedong, Free, Calm (Hana Daetoo Securities February 2010 – May 2010)
- Flash (T) over Jaedong, Fantasy, Light (Bigfile June 2010 – August 2010)
- Hydra (Z) over Great, Jaedong, Zero (PDPop December 2010 – February 2011)
- Flash (T) over Zero, Jaedong, Hydra (ABC Mart April 2011 – June 2011)

=== Winners of the World Cyber Games in StarCraft: Brood War ===
- GoRush (South Korea) (Z) over I.LOVE_STAR (South Korea) (2000)
- BoxeR (South Korea) (T) over ElkY (France) (2001)
- BoxeR (South Korea) (T) over YellOw (South Korea) (2002)
- Ogogo (South Korea) (Z) over FiSheYe (Germany) (2003)
- XellOs (South Korea) (T) over Midas (South Korea) (2004)
- fOru (South Korea) (P) over Androide (Russia) (2005)
- iloveoov (South Korea) (T) over JulyZerg (South Korea) (2006)
- Stork (South Korea) (P) over PJ (China) (2007)
- Luxury (South Korea) (Z) over Stork (South Korea) (2008)
- Jaedong (South Korea) (Z) over Stork (South Korea) (2009)
- Flash (South Korea) (T) over Kal (South Korea) (2010)

=== Winning teams of the Proleague ===
2003:

- KTF Ever: Tong Yang Orions over Hanbitstars
- Neowiz Pmang: Greatest One over Toona SG

2004 SKY:

- Round 1: Hanbitstars over SK Telecom T1
- Round 2: Pantech & Curitel Curriors over SouL
- Round 3: KOR over KTF MagicNs
- Grand Final: Hanbit Stars over Pantech & Curitel Curriors

2005 SKY:

- Season 1: SK Telecom T1 over KTF MagicNs
- Season 2: SK Telecom T1 over Samsung KHAN
- Grand Final: SK Telecom T1 over KTF MagicNs

2006 SKY:

- Season 1: SK Telecom T1 over MBC Game Hero
- Season 2: MBC Game Hero over CJ Entus
- Grand Final: MBC Game Hero over SK Telecom T1

2007 Shinhan Bank:

- Season 1: Samsung KHAN over Lecaf Oz
- Season 2: Lecaf Oz over CJ Entus
- Grand Final: Lecaf Oz over Samsung KHAN

2008 Shinhan Bank: (There is no Season1 or 2.)

- Samsung KHAN over Ongamenet Sparkyz

2008–2009 Shinhan Bank (Introduced Winners' League into format):

- Winners' League: CJ Entus over Hwaseung Oz
- Grand Final: SK Telecom T1 over Hwaseung Oz

2009–2010 Shinhan Bank:

- Winners' League: KT Rolster over MBCGame Hero
- Grand Final: KT Rolster over SK Telecom T1

2010–2011 Shinhan Bank:

- Winners' League: SK Telecom T1 over KT Rolster
- Grand Final: KT Rolster over SK Telecom T1

2011-2012 SK Planet:

- Season 1: SK Telecom T1 over KT Rolster

=== Other tournaments ===
Winners of the KBK:

- TheMarine over I.LOVE_STAR (1999)
- [GG99]Slayer (Norway) over I.LOVE_STAR (2000)
- TheMarine over PRO_NT.SONJJANG (2001)

Winners of the OGN King Of Kings tournament:

- Grrrr... (Canada) over TheBoy (2001)
- YellOw over V-Gundam (2002)

Winners of the MBC Winner's Championship:

- MuMyung over YellOw (2002)
- YellOw over BoxeR (2003)

Winners of the KT-KTF Premiere League:

- NaDa over BoxeR (2003)
- July over GoRush (2004)

Winners of BlizzCon:

- YellOw over Reach, NaDa, Nal_rA (2005)
- sAviOr over Nal_rA, Iris (2007)
- sAviOr over NaDa, Jangbi, ForGG (2008)
- Effort over Zero, sAviOr, NaDa (2009)

Winner of the CKCG (China-Korea Cyber Games)

- iloveoov over NaDa (2005)

Winner of the Snickers All-Star league:

- YellOw over NaDa (2005)

Winners of WEF (World e-sports Festival):

- sAviOr over iloveoov (2005)
- sAviOr over NaDa (2006)

Winners of Blizzard Worldwide Invitational:

- Nal_rA over YellOw (2006)
- Bisu over sAviOr (2007)
- Stork over Sea[Shield] (2008)

Winner of IEF (International e-sports Festival):

- NaDa over iloveoov (2006)
- Bisu over sAviOr (2007)
- Bisu over Stork (2008)
- Stork over Terror (2009)
- Bisu over Stork (2010)
- Bisu over Stork (2011)

Winner of the Shinhan Masters tournament:

- NaDa over sAviOr (2007)

Winner of GOM Star Invitational:

- Flash over Stork (2008)

Winner of GOM Averatec-Intel Classic:

- Jaedong over Flash (2008)
- Bisu over Jangbi (2009)
- Flash over Iris (2009)

Winner of GOM Averatec-Intel Classic Special Match:

- Jaedong over Bisu (2009)

=== Top players ranked by major tournament wins ===
Player	OSL Wins	MSL Wins	WCG Wins	Total Championships
FlaSh	3	3	1	7
NaDa	3	3	0	6
Jaedong	3	2	1	6
iloveoov	2	3	1	6
BoxeR	2	1	2	5
sAviOr	1	3	0	4
July	3	0	0	3
Bisu	0	3	0	3
Jangbi	2	0	0	2
GARIMTO	2	0	0	2
Nal_rA	1	1	0	2
Stork	1	0	1	2
XellOs	1	0	1	2
GoRush	0	1	1	2
Luxury	0	1	1	2
Anytime	1	0	0	1
Casy	1	0	0	1
EffOrt	1	0	0	1
Fantasy	1	0	0	1
FreeMuRa	1	0	0	1
GGPlay	1	0	0	1
Grrrr... (Canada)	1	0	0	1
Kingdom	1	0	0	1
Reach	1	0	0	1
Sync	1	0	0	1
Calm	0	1	0	1
Hydra	0	1	0	1
ChOJJa	0	1	0	1
ForGG	0	1	0	1
Mind	0	1	0	1
fOru	0	0	1	1
Ogogo	0	0	1	1

== Spectators ==
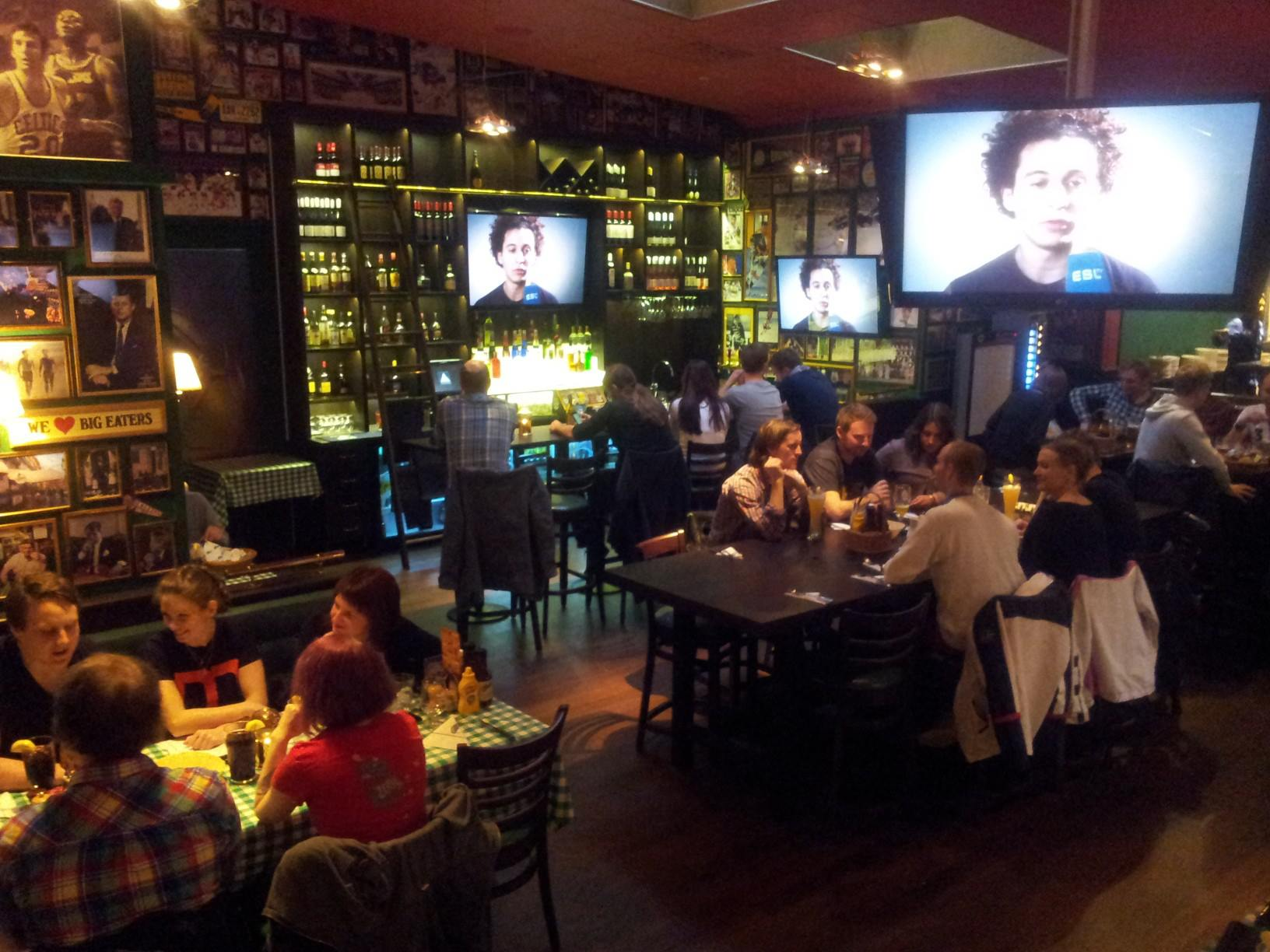
BarCraft in Stockholm, Sweden on 26 May 2013

The act of watching StarCraft games as a spectator sport at area bars became known as barcraft and expanded to bars internationally. With the success and popularity of Barcrafts, bars calling themselves "esports bars" have arisen. These bars are similar to the traditional sports bars, but instead of broadcasting sports like football and basketball, they broadcast a variety of esports games instead and serve specialty gaming themed drinks.

== See also ==
- List of esports players
- Video games in South Korea
