= Sean Plott =

American esports player and commentator (born 1986)

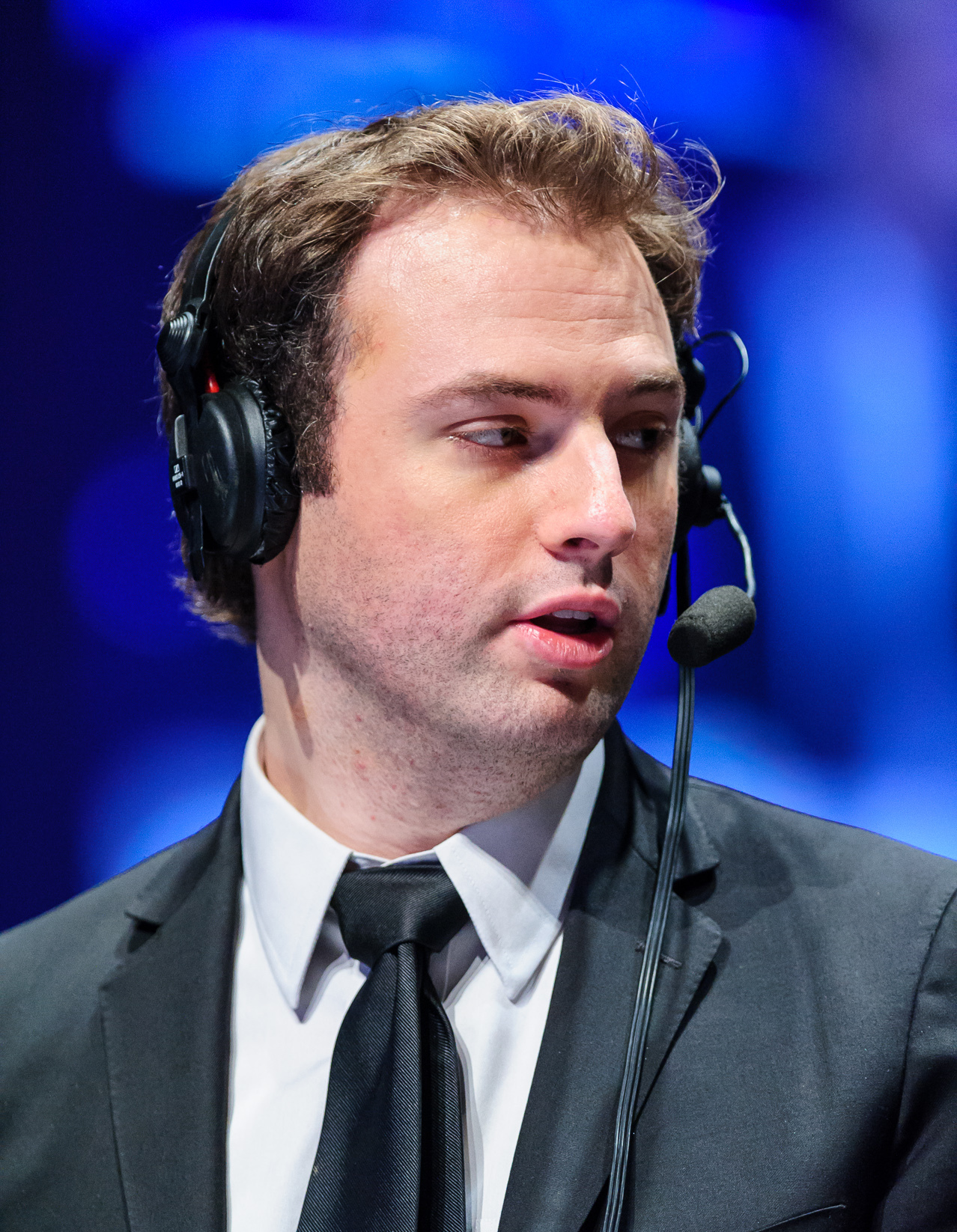
- Plott in 2013
- Born: Sean Saintmichael Plott; June 27, 1986 (age 40); Leawood, Kansas, U.S.
- Other names: "Day[9]", "Day[J]", "StriderDoom", "SleepingDrone", "Correct", "AntiTurtle", "MetaTrousers", "Detective Paul Mango"
- Education: Harvey Mudd College; University of Southern California
- Occupations: Commentator, host
- Spouse: Brit Weisman (married 2020)
- Relatives: Nick Plott
- Website: day9.tv

Sean Saintmichael Plott (born June 27, 1986), better known as Day[9], is an American esports commentator, player, event host, streamer and game designer. Plott is best known for his contributions in the professional StarCraft scene, where he regularly appeared first as a player and later as a commentator and host at various tournaments for the game for many years. He has also played other competitive games such as Magic: The Gathering, Hearthstone, and Dota 2. For the latter, Plott co-hosted The International 2017, the game's premier tournament.

== Biography ==
Plott grew up in Leawood, Kansas, was raised Catholic and attended Rockhurst High School. During this time, he and his brother Nicolas "Tasteless" Plott began playing StarCraft: Brood War. After graduating high school, he attended Harvey Mudd College in Claremont, California, where he graduated with an undergraduate degree in mathematics. After college, Plott attended the University of Southern California in Los Angeles earning a Master of Fine Arts in interactive media in May 2011. In 2014 Plott was featured in Forbes 30 Under 30.

== Career ==
=== StarCraft: Brood War ===
Plott was an avid player in the western StarCraft scene, participating in many tournaments around the U.S. playing as Zerg. Plott's first major results came in 2004 at the World Cyber Games (WCG) USA tournament. Plott then went on to represent the U.S. at the WCG Grand Finals where he finished in the top 12. Plott later placed 1st at the WCG USA tournament in 2005 and 2nd in 2006.

=== StarCraft II ===
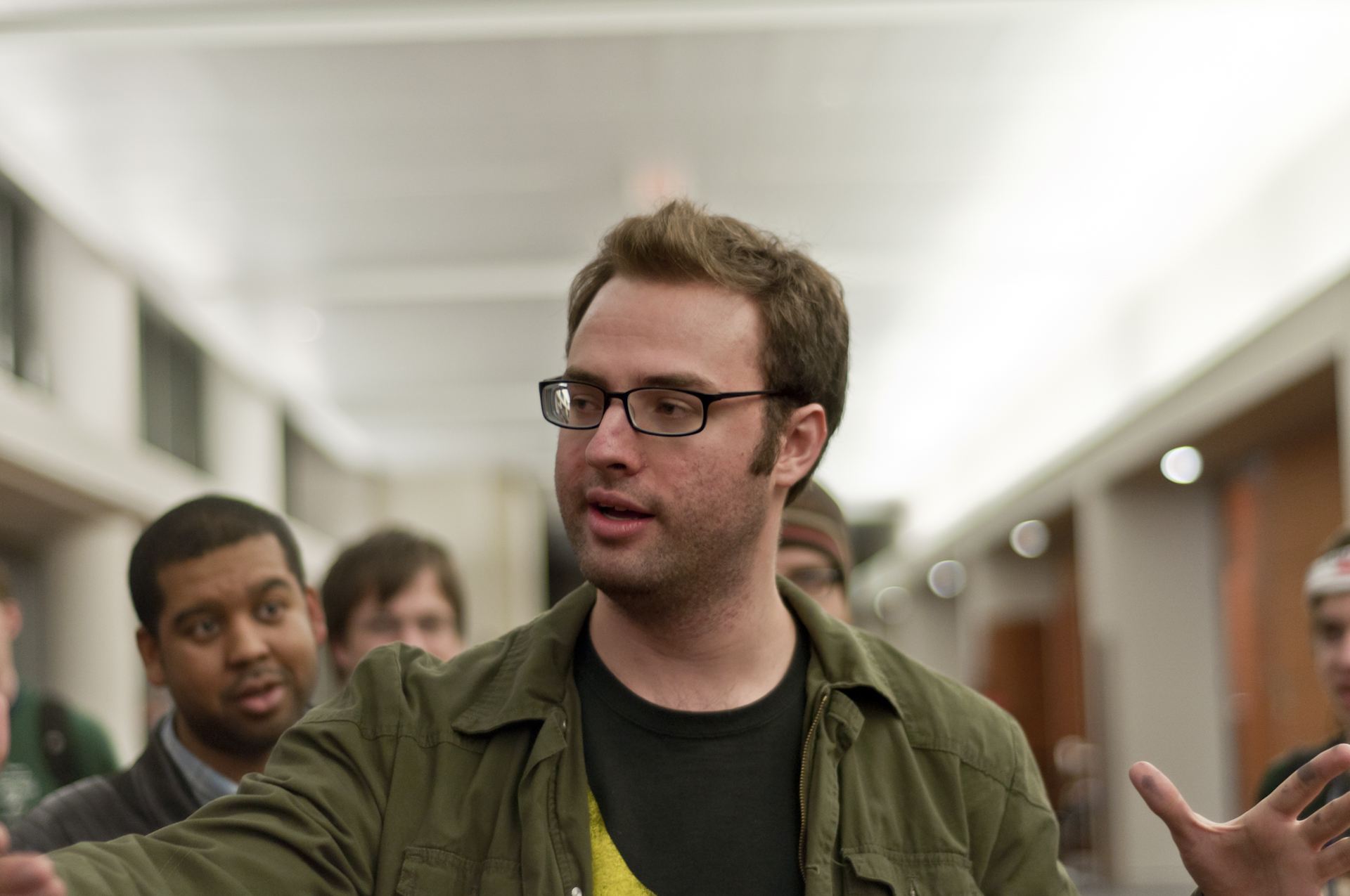
Plott speaking at PAX 2011

Sean started casting with Brood War game replays. With the release of StarCraft II, he moved away from competitive playing of his own and focused on full time streaming. He regularly cast for the Major League Gaming Pro Circuit, the seasonal DreamHack LAN, the Intel Extreme Masters' Cup, the North American Star League and other tournaments. In addition, Plott was one of the stars of "State of the Game", where he discussed current events within the StarCraft community along with other highly regarded members of the community, including the show's caster J. P. "itmeJP" McDaniel.

He was a primary caster of the BlizzCon 2011 tournament, beginning at the regional invitational qualifiers and ending at the finals, hosted at BlizzCon 2011. He has also cast a number of tournaments he himself co-organized, including the After Hours Gaming League and the SC2 beta tournament, King of the Beta.

=== Magic: The Gathering ===
In May 2013, Plott competed in a Magic: the Gathering Pro Tour as a wild card selection. The same year, he began producing a YouTube series about the game called "Spellslingers." In each episode, guests such as Felicia Day and Grant Imahara take on Plott with the hope of emerging victorious in an all-or-nothing match, while teaching the audience the tips and tricks to become better at the game. "Spellslingers" released the final episode of its 5th season on December 5, 2018.

=== Dota 2 ===
Plott served as the co-host for The International 2017, the premier tournament for Dota 2.

=== Gaming shows ===
Plott served as the host for PC Gaming Show since 2015.

== Game design ==
In September 2013, Plott joined a new game company known as Artillery. At the company, Plott worked on the real-time strategy game Guardians of Atlas, which opened to beta testing 2016. In August 2016, Plott announced that he had left the company to pursue other ventures. Guardians of Atlas was discontinued in September 2016.

In 2020, Plott worked alongside ControlZee Inc. to make a "massively interactive swarm game" called Straits of Danger on the dot big bang platform. In 2023, Sean announced the creation of his own studio named Day9's Game Studio to make a "multiplayer PC strategy game".
