= Soop (service) =

South Korean video streaming service

SOOP
- Former names: W Player (2005–2006); AfreecaTV (2006–2024)
- Website type: Video hosting service, Video streaming service
- Available in: Korean, English
- Headquarters: South Korea
- Area served: Worldwide
- Owner: Su Gil Seo (CEO)
- Parent: SOOP Corp. (2011–present); Nowcom (2005–2011)
- Website: www.sooplive.com
- Registration: Available
- Launched: May 11, 2005; 21 years ago
- Current status: Active

Soop (stylized in all caps; Korean: 숲), previously known as W Player (Korean: W플레이어) and AfreecaTV (Korean: 아프리카TV), is a video live streaming service. It is owned and operated by SOOP Co., Ltd. in South Korea, which was rebranded from Nowcom's AfreecaTV Co., Ltd, itself split with ZettaMedia in 2011.

Launched in 2005, the platform was listed fourth in the "Asia's 200 Best Under A Billion" list by Forbes in July 2019. Initially focused on Korean viewers, it began offering an English-language interface for international users in 2012. In 2024, with its parent company's rebrand, AfreecaTV was relaunched as Soop, offering two distinct services for Korea and Global users.

== History ==
Soop initially started as a W beta service on May 11, 2005, and was officially named "Afreeca" on March 9, 2006. The site mainly re-transmits TV channels but also allows users to upload their own videos and shows. Functions such as broadcasting, viewing, channel listing, live chatting, and discussion boards are provided. Users are required to install 'Afreeca Player' for grid delivery. Independent broadcasters called broadcasting jockeys (BJs) deliver live broadcasts to viewers, who can add them to their list of favorite channels using an Afreeca Player tool. Some channels have tens of thousands of viewers at any given time. Paid services such as quick views or channel relays allow BJs additional sources of revenue.

The platform ranges anywhere from TV broadcasts, live video game broadcasts, taxi driver monitoring, artist performances, and personal daily-life video blogs and shows for actresses and professional broadcasters.

The head of AfreecaTV's parent company Nowcom, Mun Yong-sik, was arrested in 2008 for illegally distributing copyrighted films. Some alleged the arrest was politically motivated due to Afreeca being used by protesters to coordinate.

On September 27, 2012, AfreecaTV English was released on the Google Play store.

One example of expansion of Afreeca's role is the hosting of a live talk session with Mayor Park of Seoul, broadcast live online and via mobile on AfreecaTV. He used the platform as a way to conduct a community scanning forum to collect public opinions and allow bloggers with various areas of expertise to participate in the dialogue. The bloggers were able to address the problems facing Seoul and propose solutions in their areas of expertise, while also exchanging ideas with Mayor Park in an in-depth discussion on the administration of the Seoul Metropolitan Government. Depending on rising of power of AfreecaTV, many Idol Groups participate in AfreecaTV for their fans, for example, Nine Muses.

In 2024, AfreecaTV was relaunched as SOOP by splitting the platform into two distinct versions: Korea and Global. The Global version was launched as a separate platform early in the year, with user interface and design different from AfreecaTV, and secures rights deals with major sporting events such as the international streaming rights of the Korea Baseball Organization, as well as becoming the exclusive streaming provider of Valorant Challengers SEA (which SOOP runs as the tournament's official organizer). On October 15, months after non-Korean languages were removed from the platform following the Global version's launch, AfreecaTV itself changed its name to SOOP, becoming the Korea version of the service.

== Controversy ==
There have been many social problems with Afreeca TV such as offers for sexual favors and abasement of disabled individuals. Many broadcasters were involved in these incidents, and they were punished by managers of Afreeca TV by suspension of their IDs. Due to such problems, mass media in South Korea have shown concern about the effects of personal broadcasting platforms.

A claim was made that audience overloading has caused overpayment of fees for Internet broadcasting. In light of this, Korea's Clean Internet Broadcasting Council came to an agreement with Afreeca TV to reduce the payment maximum to less than 1 million won (a little less than US$900) per day by June 2008.

== Esports ==
Afreeca picked up the SBENU StarCraft II team on January 23, 2016 and participated in Proleague. On November 21, 2016, it was announced that the team was disbanding its StarCraft II division, though it kept involvement in Starcraft up. They currently sponsor a professional League of Legends team, DN SOOPers (formerly Afreeca Freecs, Kwangdong Freecs and DN Freecs). The Starcraft 2 team was reformed at the start of 2020.

Afreeca also announced on January 23, 2016 that they would be sponsoring two seasons of Brood War tournaments. The tournament has proved popular and is now in its 21st season as of May 2026.

=== Esports League ===
- AfreecaTV StarCraft League (ASL)
- Global StarCraft II League (GSL)
- Afreeca TV Battle Ground League (APL)
- LoL ladies Battle
- LoL Challengers Korea
- Hearthstone battle royale
- AfreecaTV VALORANT League

=== Esports broadcast relay station ===
- Overwatch APEX relay
- League of Legends Pro League Korean Relay
- LoL Champions Korea Relay
- Sudden Attack Champions League
- AfreecaTV Tekken League (ATL)
- Chinese League of Legend Pro League (LPL)
