= Esailing World Championship =

Esports tournament

Tournament information
- Established: 2018
- Number of tournaments: Annual
- Administrator: World Sailing
- Website: www.sailing.org/our-sport/esailing//

The Esailing World Championship (ESWC) is an annual esports competition, first held in 2018 and officially recognized by World Sailing the main sports governing body. Esailing consists of real time regatta simulation via video game.

The video game support of the competition since 2018 is provided by the French company Virtual Regatta. Esailing is also one of the esport disciplines selected by the International Olympic Committee for the Olympics Esports Weeks (OEW) and Olympics Virtual Series (OVS).

== Esailing World Championship - Results ==
Year	Finals Location	Winner	2nd	3rd	Discipline	Notes
2018	Sarasota, Florida	"L1" - Elouan Le coq (FRA)	"Epicure" - O. Chapuis (FRA)	Alessandro Merlino (ITA)	Inshore Fleet Racing	
2019	Bermuda	"Velista71" - Filippo Lanfranchi (ITA)	"Asere" - Tristan Peron (FRA)	Luca Coslovich (ITA)	Inshore Fleet Racing	
2020	Virtual	Joan Cardona Méndez (ESP)	CNS - Ramón Parejo (ESP)	"Déjà Vu" - Mike O'Donovan (GBR)	Inshore Fleet Racing	
2021	Virtual	UOL - Carlos Parejo (ESP)	"VIT Chico" - Francisco Pinheiro de Melo (POR)	"MCES Pepito" - Tim Carpentier (FRA)	Inshore Fleet Racing	
2022	Alicante	"AlexK RS" - Alexandre Kowalski (FRA)	"Farley RS" - Arthur Farley (GBR)	Bart Lambriex (NED)	Inshore Fleet Racing	
2023	Trieste	"UOL Asere" - Tristan Peron (FRA)	"Farley RS" - Arthur Farley (GBR)	"UOL Pepito" - Tim Carpentier (FRA)	Inshore Fleet Racing	
2024	Stockholm	"F7 RS" - Arthur Farley (GBR)	"ChicoPmelo" - Francisco Pinheiro de Melo (POR)	"FUNe KG-R" - Toshiki Kogure (JPN)	Inshore Fleet Racing	
2025	Gdynia	"Asere" - Tristan Peron (FRA)	"FSC-Kazuki" - Kazuki Miyamae (JPN)	"zemendes-RS" - José Mendes (POR)	Inshore Fleet Racing	

== Team Esailing World Championship - nations'Cup ==
Since 2020, the Esailing Team World Championship are also organized among supporting national federations of World Sailing. The team from Great Britain (GBR) won the first edition, followed by the team from France (FRA) in 2021,2022,2024, the team from Italie (ITA) in 2023 and the team from Japan (JPN) in 2025.

== Esailing Nations Medal Scoreboard ==
Ranking of nation by medal obtained in Esailing World Championships from World Sailing

Country - federation	Gold		Silver		Bronze		ESWC participants	
France (FRA)	7	2018 "L1" - Elouan Le coq (FRA); 2021 France- Nation Cup; 2022 "AlexK RS" - ALexandre Kowalski (FRA); 2022 France- Nation Cup; 2023 "UOL Asere" - Tristan Peron (FRA); 2024 France- Nation Cup; 2025 "Asere" - Tristan Peron (FRA)	3	2018 "Epicure" - O. Chapuis (FRA); 2019 "Asere" - Tristan Peron (FRA); 2023 France- Nation Cup	3	2021 "MCES Pepito" - Tim Carpentier (FRA); 2023 "UOL Pepito" - Tim Carpentier (FRA); 2025 France- Nation Cup	19	3 (2018); 3 (2019); 2 (2020); 2 (2021); 2 (2022); 4 (2023); 2 (2024); 1 (2025)
Great Britain (GBR)	2	2020 Great Britain - Nation Cup; 2024 "F7 RS" - Arthur Farley (GBR)	4	2021 Great Britain - Nation Cup; 2022 Great Britain - Nation Cup; 2022 "Farley RS" - Arthur Farley (GBR); 2023 "Farley RS" - Arthur Farley (GBR)	1	2020 "Déjà Vu" - Mike O'Donovan (GBR)	7	2 (2020); 2 (2021); 1 (2022); 1 (2023); 1 (2024)
Italie (ITA)	2	2019 "Velista71" - Filippo Lanfranchi (ITA); 2023 Italie Nation Cup	2	2024 Italie Nation Cup; 2025 Italie Nation Cup	3	2018 Alessandro Merlino (ITA); 2019 Luca Coslovich (ITA); 2021 Italie Nation Cup	11	2 (2018); 2 (2019); 1 (2021); 3 (2022); 1 (2023); 1 (2024); 1 (2025)
Spain (ESP)	2	2020 Joan Cardona Méndez (ESP); 2021 UOL Carlos Parejo (ESP)	2	2020 CNS - Ramón Parejo (ESP); 2020 Spain- Nation Cup	1	2022 Spain- Nation Cup	8	1 (2018); 3 (2020); 2 (2021); 2 (2024)
Japan (JPN)	1	2025 Japan Nation Cup	1	2025 FSC-Kazuki- Kazuki Miyamae	3	2023 Japan - Nation Cup; 2024 "FUNe KG-R" - Toshiki Kogure (JPN); 2024 Japan - Nation Cup	9	1 (2021); 3 (2023); 2 (2024); 3 (2025)
Portugal (POR)			2	2021 "VIT Chico" - Francisco Pinheiro de Melo (POR); 2024 "ChicoPmelo" - Francisco Pinheiro de Melo (POR)	1	2025 "zemendes-RS" - José Mendes (POR)	3	1 (2021); 1 (2024); 1 (2025)
Netherlands (NED)					1	2022 Bart Lambriex (NED)	5	1 (2019); 2 (2022); 2 (2023)
Turkiye (TUR)							3	1 (2018); 1 (2019); 1 (2020)
Sweden (SWE)							3	1 (2024); 2 (2025)
Brasil (BRA)							3	1 (2024); 2 (2025)
Greece (GRE)							2	1 (2021); 1 (2022)
Poland (POL)							2	1 (2024); 1 (2025)
New Zealand (NZL)							1	1 (2018)
Croatia (CRO)							1	1 (2020)
Germany (GER)							1	1 (2022)
Switzerland (SUI)							1	1 (2023)
Ukraine (UKR)							1	1 (2025)

== Olympics Virtual Series (OVS) Esailing Champions ==
During the Spring 2021, The Olympics Virtual Series where held. For the first time, 5 esports disciplines organized esport Competition under the Olympic realm.

Esailing being one of the 5 selected esports.

The Inshore Series featured three action-fueled events which each crowned a winner and runners-up. The three events were split into three boat types; the 49’er, Laser and Nacra 17, and took place on the shores of Kiel, Rio de Janeiro and Marseille.

=== Laser - 25 May 2021 ===
Boat	Winner	2nd	3rd	Notes
Laser	"Havuc" - Kaan Mazlumca (TUR)	Mike O'Donovan (GBR)	Tim Carpentier (FRA)	

=== 49er - 6 June 2021 ===
Boat	Winner	2nd	3rd	Notes
49er	Lukas Mohr (DEN)	Arhur Farley (GBR)	Tangi Le Goff (FRA)	

=== Nacra - 23 June 2021 ===
Boat	Winner	2nd	3rd	Notes
Nacra	Arhur Farley (GBR)	Bart Lambriex (NED)	Joan Cardona Méndez (ESP)	

The Offshore Race was a race from Rio to Tokyo.

== Olympics Esports Week (OEW) - Esailing - Singapore 2023 ==
As a follow-up to 2021's Olympic Virtual Series, the IOC and the Singapore National Olympic Council held the inaugural Olympic Esports Week in Singapore in June 2023. Several Sports Games were part of the event including esailing whose finale was held on 23 June.

Winner	2nd	3rd	Notes
"UOL Pepito" - Tim Carpentier (FRA)	Cavan Fyans (GBR)	"Magic - ChicoPMelo" Francisco Melo (POR)	

== European Championship Results ==
The Esailing European Championship was run by EUROSAF in 2023 and 2024.

Year	Winner	2nd	3rd	Discipline
2023	"asere" - Tristan Péron (FRA)	"Farley" - Arthur Farley (GBR)	"Pichnett" - Théo Pichery (FRA)	Inshore Fleet Racing
2024	"asere" - Tristan Péron (FRA)	"Luca Coslovich" - Luca Coslovich (ITA)	Moro Di Napoli - Antonio D'Angelo (ITA)	Inshore Fleet Racing

== 2024 America's Cup Eseries ==
In September 2024, The Louis Vuitton 37th America’s Cup has entered into esport with AC Sailing and the first-ever esport AC championship.

The competition consisted of six weekly online qualifier rounds, with the winners earning their spot in the America’s Cup e-Series Grand Final.

Two additional wild-card players joined the live final held on September 28th in Barcelona. The final saw the victory of Liam Dimock | EsailingCentral from New Zealand after 5 contested Races, bringing home the trophy and 25000€ cash prize.

The competition was held using the America Cup sailing simulator game, developed & published by Emirates Team New Zealand

Boat	Winner	2nd	3rd	Notes
AC 40	"EsailingCentral" - Liam Dimock (NZL)	"Booshify" Robbie Wooldridge (NZL)	BengBengFra (FRA)	
