= G7 Teams =

Association of professional esports teams

- Formation: 2006; 19 years ago
- Founders: 7 esports teams: 4Kings; fnatic; Made in Brazil; mousesports; Ninjas in Pyjamas; SK Gaming; Team 3D
- Dissolved: 2010; 15 years ago
- Purpose: Esports team association
- Website: g7teams.com (archived)

The G7 Teams or G7 Federation was an association of professional esports teams. It was originally formed by seven teams in 2006: 4Kings, fnatic, Made in Brazil, mousesports, Ninjas in Pyjamas, SK Gaming and Team 3D. At its dissolution, the organization was made up of six members. The organization aimed to promote the interest of the community and players to tournament organizers, sponsors, and other professional gaming institutions. The G7 teams had active presence in the advisory boards for both the World Series of Video Games and KODE5, and has relations with other tournament organizations, including the Cyberathlete Professional League, along with its players committee, and the Electronic Sports World Cup. The G7 teams also recognized in Zonerank as the official world esports rankings. In 2010, after a contract dispute between fnatic and SK Gaming, the organization dissolved.

== Members ==
=== Founding members ===
- 4Kings
- fnatic
- Made in Brazil
- mousesports
- Ninjas in Pyjamas
- SK Gaming
- Team 3D

=== Later members ===
- Evil Geniuses (joined in September 2008)
- compLexity (ruled out in February 2008 due to joining the CGS, re-joined in early 2009)
- Ninjas in Pyjamas (dissolved in late 2007)
- Team 3D (ruled out in February 2008 due to joining the CGS)
- 4Kings (ruled out due in September 2008 to inactivity)
- PGS Gaming (ruled out due in September 2008 to inactivity)
- wNv Teamwork (ruled out in February 2009)
- MeetYourMakers (removed in March 2009)

== Meetings ==
G7 met once in 2007 from January 19 to 27 in Cologne, Germany. They planned on meeting annually. Among the subjects discussed were the selection of official games and change of league regulations. At the event, it was also announced that the group would expand further and take in their first Asian team, wNv. The goal was to further enhance the connection with Asian esport clubs and push forward the influence of world esport.
