= 4 Kings =

4 Kings may refer to:

- Books of Kings, book in the Hebrew Bible
- 4 Kings (2015 film), German film
- 4 Kings (2021 film), Thai film
- 4Kings, esports organization
- Raja Ampat Islands

== See also ==
- Four Kings
