= University Esports =

European collegiate esports partnership

- Industry: Collegiate esports
- Founded: 3 February 2020
- Headquarters: Distrito Digital; Alicante, Spain
- Area served: Italy; Spain; United Kingdom
- Key people: Jose Parilla Perez; Josh Williams
- Parent: GGTech Entertainment
- Website: universityesports.net

University Esports is a collegiate esports partnership headquartered in the offices of GGTech Entertainment in Alicante, Spain.

== History ==
The partnership was founded in February 2020 with the support of American technology company Amazon. It includes collegiate hosts GGTech, the NUEL, and PG Esports from Spain, the United Kingdom and Italy, respectively.

== Sponsorship ==
University Esports sponsors tournaments for League of Legends, Teamfight Tactics and Clash Royale. In the UK, they also sponsor the NUEL's tournaments for Counter-Strike: Global Offensive and Tom Clancy's Rainbow Six Siege.

Intel sponsors University Esports in Turkey; the organization holds events in League Of Legends and Valorant in the region.
