= Professional Gamers League =

1990s American esports league

- Sport: Command & Conquer: Red Alert; Quake; Quake II; Total Annihilation; StarCraft; StarCraft: Brood War
- Founded: 1997
- Owner: Total Entertainment Network
- Commissioner: Nolan Bushnell
- Country: United States
- Sponsors: Advanced Micro Devices; Microsoft; Nvidia

The AMD Professional Gamers League (PGL), founded in 1997, was one of the first professional esports leagues. The PGL was run by Total Entertainment Network and was sponsored by AMD. The league was officially unveiled at a press conference at Candlestick Park in San Francisco on November 3, 1997, with Nolan Bushnell as league commissioner. It was sponsored by Microsoft, Nvidia, Levi Strauss & Co., GTE, and USRobotics. The organization raised over $1.2mil USD in sponsorship money. Additionally, TEN hoped to monetize the league by allowing anyone to enter the league, as long as they paid the $10 subscription fee to the TEN service. PGL lasted for four seasons of competition before going inactive.

PGL operated two competitions per season: one in the "Action" category and one in the "Strategy" category. The action category featured Quake in the first season, and Quake II for the three seasons after. The strategy category initially featured Command & Conquer: Red Alert, and later featured Starcraft.

Nearly 1,400 players entered qualification for the first season's Quake competition, which took place online. After the online qualifiers narrowed the field to 256 players, the first-ever PGL Finals took place on January 30 and January 31, 1998, in Seattle, Washington at the Sega GameWorks super-arcade. Both the Red Alert and Quake tournaments featured 1 on 1 play with David "DeepBlue" Magro winning the Red Alert tournament and Dennis "Thresh" Fong winning the Quake tournament. Each player won $7,500 and new AMD computers.

Season 2 took place in Atlanta, in May 1998. This was the first tournament to feature Quake II after its 1997 release, along with Total Annihilation.

Season 3 hosted the first ever Starcraft World Championship, where 128 players from around the globe competed in online qualification in August and September 6, 1998. The final eight competitors then played live in San Francisco, CA. Jay "Gadianton" Severson took first place going undefeated in the double-elimination bracket to win $8500 and a new AMD computer. Season 3 again featured Quake II, and Thresh easily won the category's final.

The fourth and final season took place in New York City in May 1999, featuring Quake II and StarCraft.

In 2000, Gamers.com, founded by former PGL star Thresh, acquired the PGL from Pogo.com, after PGL had been inactive for a year.

== See also ==
- Guillaume "Grrrr..." Patry, StarCraft: Brood War player who got 3rd in 1998, later went on to be the only non-Korean to win an OnGameNet Starleague tournament
- Cyberathlete Professional League - similar esports league
