= Esailing Team World Championship =

ESports tournament

Esailing Team World Championship - The Nations Cup

Tournament information
- Established: 2020
- Number of tournaments: Annual
- Administrator: World Sailing
- Tournament format: brackets
- Host: World Sailing
- Venue: virtual
- Website: www.sailing.org/our-sport/esailing/

Current champion
- France

The Esailing Team World Championship also known as the Esailing Nations' Cup is an annual esports competition, first held in 2020 and officially recognised by World Sailing the main sports governing body.

Year	Finals Location	Winner	2nd	3rd	Discipline	Notes
2020	Virtual	Great Britain (GBR)	Spain (ESP)	-	Team Fleet Racing	
2021	Virtual	France (FRA)	Great Britain (GBR)	Italia (ITA)	Team Fleet Racing	
2022	Virtual	France (FRA)	Great Britain (GBR)	Spain (ESP)	Team Fleet Racing	
2023	Virtual	Italia (ITA)	France (FRA)	Japan (JPN)	Team Fleet Racing	
2024	Virtual	France (FRA)	Italia (ITA)	Japan (JPN)	Team Fleet Racing	
2025	Virtual	Japan (JPN)	Italia (ITA)	France (FRA)	Team Fleet Racing	

Teams are composed by National sailing federation and must contains male and female players, as well as at least one U21 player.

== Nations Cup 2020 ==
=== Participating teams ===
13 teams participated in the 2020 nations cup. A fleet seeding round allowed to populate a bracket tournament which ran over the months of September to November 2020.

Great Britain (GBR),Spain (ESP),Japan (JPN),France (FRA),Ireland (IRL),Sweden (SWE),Denmark (DEN),Poland (POL),Switzerland (SUI),Germany (GER),Italy (ITA),The netherlands (NED),Russia (RUS)

=== winning team: Great Britain ===
Name
"Déja Vu" - Mike O'Donovan (GBR)
Donnie Gillies (GBR)
"speedy_1" - Alasdair Ireland (GBR)
"TP52GLAD" - Douglas Newell (GBR)
"AdamGP14" - Adam McGovern (GBR)
"Skippafire" - Bryan Davies (GBR)
"ACF" - Cavan Fyans (GBR)
Phil Manning (GBR)
"isswizz" - Issy Waha (GBR)
Hugh Brayshaw (GBR)

=== Championship final table ===
Round of 16
1	Spain (ESP)
16
8	Japan (JPN)	5
9	France (FRA)	4
4	Ireland (IRL)	4
13	Sweden (SWE)	5
5	Denmark (DEN)	6
12	Poland (POL)	3
2	Great Britain (GBR)
15
7	Switzerland (SUI)	4
10	Germany (GER)	5
3	Italy (ITA)
14
6	The netherlands (NED)	6
11	Russia (RUS)	3

Quarterfinals
1	Spain (ESP)	8
8	Japan (JPN)	1
13	Sweden (SWE)	1
5	Denmark (DEN)	8
2	Great Britain (GBR)	8
10	Germany (GER)	1
3	Italy (ITA)	5
6	The netherlands (NED)	4

Semifinals
1	Spain (ESP)	7
5	Denmark (DEN)	2
2	Great Britain (GBR)	5
3	Italy (ITA)	4

Championship
1	Spain (ESP)	3
2	Great Britain (GBR)	6

== Nations Cup 2021 ==
=== Participating teams ===
15 teams participated in the 2021 nations cup. A fleet seeding round allowed to populate a bracket tournament which ran over the months of September to November 2021.

Great Britain (GBR),Spain (ESP),Japan (JPN),France (FRA),Ireland (IRL),Sweden (SWE),Denmark (DEN),Poland (POL),Switzerland (SUI),Germany (GER),Italy (ITA),The netherlands (NED),Russia (RUS),Oman (OMA),Turkey (TUR)

=== Winning team: France ===
Name
"UOL Asere" - Tristan Péron (FRA)
"MCES Pepito" - Tim Carpentier (FRA)
"MCES Sinjid" - Alexandre Gouin (FRA)
"Barbie22" - Barbara Cavyn (FRA)
"MCES Tangi2232" - Tangi Le Goff (FRA)
"MCES Valentinelisa" - Stephane Galzin (FRA)
"COOL - xav-nice" - Xavier Noblin (FRA)
"COOL - FanchVR" - François Méheut (FRA)
"julyfra" - David krief (FRA)
"Ginsu 2000" - Luc Pruvot (FRA)
"cricqueville" - Cyril Boivin (FRA)
"LaMerNoire" - Baptiste Gully (FRA)
"L1" - Elouan Le Coq (FRA)
"LaureEVC" - Laure (FRA)

=== Championship final table ===
Round of 16
1	Great Britain (GBR)
16
8	Germany (GER)	3
9	Denmark (DEN)	6
4	The netherlands (NED)	5
13	Poland (POL)	4
5	Italy (ITA)	6
12	Turkey (TUR)	3
2	France (FRA)	9
15	Oman (OMA)	0
7	Japan (JPN)	8
10	Ireland (IRL)	1
3	Spain (ESP)	8
14	Sweden (SWE)	1
6	The netherlands (NED)	6
11	Russia (RUS)	3

Quarterfinals
1	Great Britain (GBR)	7
9	Denmark (DEN)	2
4	The netherlands (NED)	4
5	Italy (ITA)	5
2	France (FRA)	7
7	Japan (JPN)	2
3	Spain (ESP)	8
6	The netherlands (NED)	1

Semifinals
1	Great Britain (GBR)	5
5	Italy (ITA)	4
2	France (FRA)	6
3	Spain (ESP)	3

Championship
1	Great Britain (GBR)	4
2	France (FRA)	5
Third place
4	Italy (ITA)	5
3	Spain (ESP)	4

== Nations Cup 2022 ==
=== Participating teams ===
15 teams participated in the 2022 nations cup. Teams have been first been split in 4 Groups of 4 for a Round Robin phase. Each first and second of each group qualified to populate a bracket tournament that ran over the month of November & December 2022.

Great Britain (GBR),Spain (ESP),Japan (JPN),France (FRA),New Zelande (NZL),Sweden (SWE),Denmark (DEN),Poland (POL),Switzerland (SUI),Germany (GER),Italy (ITA),The netherlands (NED),Australia (AUS),Brasil (BRA),Turkey (TUR)

=== Winning team: France ===
Name
"UOL Asere" - Tristan Péron (FRA)
"Barbie22" - Barbara Cavyn (FRA)
"UOL Pepito" - Tim Carpentier (FRA)
"Tangi2232" - Tangi Le Goff (FRA)
"AlexK RS" - Alexandre Kowalski (FRA)
"gadek" - Gaétan de Kat (FRA)
"Valentinelisa" - Stephane Galzin (FRA)
"COOL - xav-nice" - Xavier Noblin (FRA)
"COOL - FanchVR" - François Méheut (FRA)
"TRAP BrestPower" - Vincent Cuzon (FRA)
"Pichnett" - Pichery Théo (FRA)
"Ginsu 2000" - Luc Pruvot (FRA)
"cricqueville" - Cyril Boivin (FRA)
"L1" - Elouan Le Coq (FRA)
"CALUKERIC" - Cédric Nickles (FRA)

=== Championship final table ===
Quarterfinals
1st GrA	France (FRA)	8
2nd GrC	Japan (JPN)	1
1st GrD	Spain (ESP)	8
2nd GrB	The Nederlands (NED)	1
1st GrB	Great Britain (GBR)	8
2nd GrD	Turkiye (TUR)	1
1st GrC	Italy (ITA)	7
2nd GrA	Sweden (SWE)	2

Semifinals
France (FRA)	6
Spain (ESP)	3
Great Britain (GBR)	6
Italy (ITA)	3

Championship
France (FRA)	6
Great Britain (GBR)	3
Third place
Italy (ITA)	3
Spain (ESP)	6

== Nations Cup 2023 ==
=== Participating teams ===
8 teams have been participating in the 2023 nations cup. Teams have been first been split in 2 Groups of 4 for a Round Robin phase.

Japan (JPN),France (FRA),Sweden (SWE),Poland (POL),Switzerland (SUI),Germany (GER),Italy (ITA),Turkey (TUR)

First and second of each group then seeded a bracket tournament that ran in December 2023, with the final taking place on 17th of December.

France (FRA) and Japan (JPN) qualified from group A.

Italy (ITA) and Poland (POL) from group B.

=== Championship final table ===
Semifinals
1st Grp A	France (FRA)	6
2nd Grp B	Poland (POL)	3
1st Grp B	Italy (ITA)	5
2nd Grp A	Japan (JPN)	4

Championship
France (FRA)	4
Italy (ITA)	5
Third place
Poland (POL)	4
Japan (JPN)	5

=== Winning team: Italia ===
Name
"ITA 4172" Nicolo Gatti (ITA)
"Lorenzo42" Lorenzo Sorrenti (ITA)
"Sosi" - Rosalba Giordano (ITA)
"Velista25" – Amos Di Benedetto (ITA)
"FIV Rock" – Rocco Guerra (ITA)
Luca Coslovich (ITA)
"Velista86" – Alberto Carraro (ITA)
"Charizard" – Stefano Bonatti (ITA)
"Moro Di Napoli" – Antonio D’angelo (ITA)
"TommyTamble" – Tommaso Tamblè (ITA)
"JL77" – Jacopo Lucchetti (ITA)
"Habibroo" - Lucia Zane (ITA)
"La Gatta Gnuda" – Gianfranco Parretti (ITA)
"Velista71" – Filippo Lanfranchi (ITA)
"MIK bayern" – MIchele Catucci (ITA)
"Movimento 5 nodi" – Carlo Sbacchi (ITA)
"Lele Adani" – Fabio Zaccolo (ITA)
"Fujivia" – Michele Rossi (ITA)
"Lostrio" – Alessandro Vadacca (ITA)
Ottavio" – Ottavio Mozzoni (ITA)

== Nations Cup 2024 ==
=== Participating teams ===
7 teams have been participating in the 2024 nations cup. Teams have first meet in a round Robin phase.

Japan (JPN),France (FRA),Sweden (SWE),Poland (POL),Switzerland (SUI),Germany (GER),Italy (ITA)

The round robin results of the teams allowed to seed the nation's cup knockout table. Quarter finals were held in December 2025 while semi were held in January 2025 with bronze finale and finale taking place on 25 and 26th of January 2025.

=== Championship final table ===
Quarterfinals
1	France (FRA)
BYE
4	Sweden (SWE)	4
5	Poland (POL)	5
2	Japan (JPN)	8
7	Switzerland (SUI)	1
3	Italy (ITA)	9
6	Germany (GER)	0

Semifinals
France (FRA)	7
Poland (POL)	2
Japan (JPN)	3
Italy (ITA)	6

Championship
France (FRA)	5
Italy (ITA)	4
Third place
Poland (POL)	4
Japan (JPN)	5

=== Winning team: France ===
Name
"Asere" - Tristan Péron (FRA)
"AlexK RS" - Alexandre Kowalski (FRA)
"ATL Pepito" - Tim Carpentier (FRA)
"TRAP Barbie22" - Barbara Cavyn (FRA)
"BlackPanther" - Aurelie Martin (FRA)
Stephane Galzin (FRA)
"TRAP BrestPower" - Vincent Cuzon (FRA)
"Pichnett TRAP" - Pichery Théo (FRA)
"Ginsu" - Luc Pruvot (FRA)
"cricqueville" - Cyril Boivin (FRA)
"Halkaléa" - Jean Philippe Arras (FRA)
"Capitonio" - Ludovic Celerier (FRA)
"Mournier" - Adrien Fournier (FRA)
"July fra" - David Krief (FRA)
"FullHydroSail" - Andres Lemos (FRA)
"COOL - Voiles de Metz" - Thibaut-Hugues Gallois (FRA)

== Nations Cup 2025 ==
=== Participating teams ===
8 teams are participating in the 2025 nations cup. Teams have first been split in 2 Groups of 4 for a Round Robin phase.

Group A :

1. Italy (ITA) 11 pts
2. Sweden (SWE) 10 pts
3. Germany (GER) 5 pts
4. Hungary (HUN) 4 pts

Group B :

1. Japan (JPN) 11 pts
2. France (FRA) 10 pts
3. Poland (POL) 5 pts
4. Switzerland (SUI) 4 pts

The round robin were run in December 2025. and results allowed to seed the full nations cup knockout table.

The knockout table games has been run over the month of January 2026 and grand final held on 1 February 2026 with Japan winning its first nations's cup.

=== Championship final table ===
Quarterfinals
1	Italy (ITA)	8
8	Switzerland (SUI)	1
4	France (FRA)	5
5	Germany (GER)	3
2	Japan (JPN)	6
7	Hungary (HUN)	3
3	Sweden (SWE)	3
6	Poland (POL)	6

Semifinals
Italy (ITA)	6
France (FRA)	3
Japan (JPN)	6
Poland (POL)	3

Championship
Italy (ITA)	4
Japan (JPN)	5
Third place
France (FRA)	6
Poland (POL)	3

=== Winning team: Japan ===
Name
"Vegas" - 松浦夏樹 - Natsuki Matsuura (JPN)
"FC RICH" - 田窪 祐也 - Yuya Takubo (JPN)
"Minee_RVsail" - 峰岡拓真 - Takuma Mineoka (JPN)
"985" - 熊谷一樹 - Kazuki Kumagai (JPN)
"FSC-Kazuki" - 宮前佳月 - Kazuki Miyamae (JPN)
"FlyingBOSS" - 佐藤 俊 - Shun Sato (JPN)
"トッティ&tottexi" - 戸田崚斗 - Ryoto Toda (JPN)
"KG-R" - 木暮俊貴 - Toshiki Kogure (JPN)
"Yuko31657" - 古川悠航 - Yuko Furukawa (JPN)
"ozuyL" - 渡辺隆蔵 - Ryuzo Watanabe (JPN)
"muimui" - 村上太一 - Taichi Murakami (JPN)
"Nananana" - 大西奈々子 - Nanako Onishi (JPN)
"Kanako_" - 三木 花菜子 - Kanako Miki (JPN)
"優月-Yutsuki" - 細木和輝 - Kazuki Hosogi (JPN)
"KRN_" - 石川香蓮 - Karen Ishikawa (JPN)
"まっす〜" - 増浦亮太 - Ryota Masuura (JPN) (RR)
