= Joan Cardona =

Spanish competitive sailor

Personal information
- Full name: Joan Cardona Méndez
- Nationality: Spanish
- Born: 27 May 1998 (age 28) Mahón, Spain
- Height: 1.90 m (6 ft 3 in)

Sailing career
- Sport: Sailing
- Club: Real Club Náutico de Palma
- Classes: Optimist, Laser, Finn
Medal record
Sailing
Representing Spain
Olympic Games
Bronze medal – third place	2020 Tokyo	Finn

Joan Cardona Méndez (born 27 May 1998) is a male Spanish competitive sailor. He is a member of Real Club Náutico de Palma. He won the bronze medal in the Finn event at the 2020 Summer Olympics.
