= Virtual Regatta =

- Genre: Massively online real time ocean race simulator
- Publisher: Virtual Regatta SAS
- Creator: Philippe Guigné
- Platforms: Browser and mobile apps
- First release: 2006

Virtual Regatta is an online web browser sailing race simulator, though the development of a mobile app version of the game has seen a significant number of users shift to this platform in recent years.

The company was created in France by Philippe Guigné, CEO of ManyPlayers, for the 2006 edition of the Route du Rhum, with Virtual Regatta Offshore established as a real-time yacht routing game. Since then, the company has been working with the media departments of major oceanic races and their sponsors.

In 2015, the company developed Virtual Regatta Inshore, a fleet racing game (similar to that of car racing games), in partnership with World Sailing. This led to the first eSailing World Championship in 2018.

== Virtual Regatta Offshore ==
=== Game play ===
Virtual RegattaOffshore organizes approximately 15 races a year. Some of these are held in partnership with some of the world's most famous sailing races, including the Vendée Globe, Route du Rhum, Volvo Ocean Race and the Solitaire du Figaro. These virtual regattas have routes identical to that of the actual race and the same start times.

For each race, Virtual Regatta simulates the real meteorological conditions experienced by the skippers and allows its players to participate in real-time from their computers or mobile devices. Players have to take into account real-time meteorological conditions in order to choose the best sail settings and heading, as they race against one another around the course. After signing up for a race, players can also choose their preferred type of boat and personalize it.

Some races offer prize money of up to thousands of euros, which is split among the winners.

As of 2020 the offshore version of the game had:

- 1.5M active players
- 193 countries represented
- 50 races per year
- 13 classes of boats

The first major event had approximately 50,000 players.

However the game quickly grew. Following this success 2008-2009 Vendee Globe and 2009-2010 Volvo Ocean Race, the French Sailing Federation granted Virtual Regatta the status of a nautical club, where one can obtain a sailing license, in 2011.

In 2010, the site had 600,000 registered players. There was an average of 35,000 players participating in each race, though races like the Vendée Globe and Volvo Ocean race saw more players. 245,000 players competed in the Route du Rhum 2010, which was won by "Bolki".

In 2014 Virtual Regatta organized challenges with famous skippers Loïc Peyron in 2009, Samantha Davies in 2010 and Roland Jourdain in 2011, with the 3 skippers participating in the virtual race alongside the other players.

=== Pinnacle Races - Vendee Globe ===
Virtual Vendee Globe Winners
| Edition | Competitors | Winner Username | Winner Name | Winners Time | Ref. |
|---|---|---|---|---|---|
| 2008-2009 Vendee Globe | 340 000 | | Hugues Fournier (FRA) | 85 days, 19 hours and 45 minutes | |
| 2012-2013 Vendee Globe | 460 000 | | Lilian Launay (FRA) | 74 days, 16 hours and 59 minutes | |
| 2016-2017 Vendee Globe | 451,000 | | Mathew Johnson (AUS) | 72 days, 2 hours, 23 minutes and 10 seconds | |
| 2020-2021 Vendee Globe | 1 000 000+ | tigrou26120, | Jean-Claude Goudon | 68 days, 22 hours, 16 minutes and 4 seconds | |
| 2024-2025 Vendee Globe | 827 000 | Gilou | Gilles Boulard | 75 days 14 hours 41 minutes | |

The game's popularity spiked during the 2008-2009 Vendée Globe, which saw 340,000 virtual sailors participate. The winner, Hugues Fournier, took 85 days, 19 hours and 45 minutes to sail around the world, which was only 36 hours more than the real winner of the race, Michel Desjoyeaux.

The game inspired the 200-page novel Sur la vague virtuelle du vendée, written by author Patrice Baluc-Rittener and published in 2008. The story is a autobiographical recount of the author's personal adventure on board his virtual boat, “MacAII” on Virtual Regatta during the 2008-09 Vendée Globe. “MacAII” finished the race in 88 days, 11 hours and 15 minutes.

The 2012-2013 Vendée Globe saw 460,000 players, a fleet so big the Virtual Regatta servers experienced issues at the start of the race (though these were fixed soon after). The winner of this edition, "llyl" took 74 days, 16 hours and 59 minutes. The hype around the virtual race drew both local and international media attention.

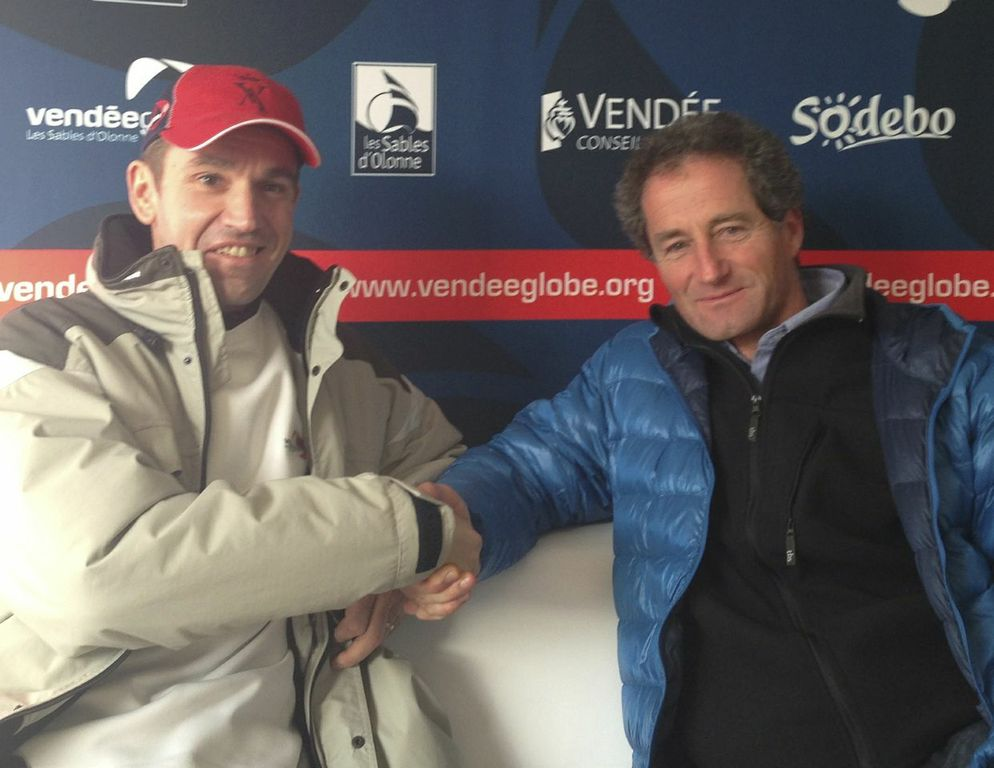
Lilian Launay (FRA), winner of Virtual Vendée Globe 2012-2013, with Michel Desjoyeaux, two winner of the Vendée Globe 2000-2001 et 2008-2009.

The Vendée Globe 2016 brought together some 451,000 skippers, during which Virtual Regatta introduced "certified players" for the first time. These "certified players" included world renowned skippers, such as Loïck Peyron, Ian Lipinski and Yves le Blevec, and celebrities like Sylvain Marconnet and Estelle Denis, all of whom played the race from start to finish.

Every night at 20:00 during a race, participants were able to tune into “Virtual Regatta News”, a 10-minute news show about the virtual regatta with weather information and routing advice. During one race, this video-blog had over 40 million views. The presenter was the pro sailor Sébastien Destremeau.

The 2020-2021 Vendee Globe was by far the largest ever online sailing game with over 1,000,000 unique users and is believed to be the first online game of any type breaking a million users in a single race. It was won by French sailor Jean-Claude Goudon, who user name was “tigrou26120,” with finished in a time of 68 days, 22 hours, 16 minutes and 4 seconds.

=== Pinnacle Races - The Ocean Race ===
The Volvo Ocean Race

In 2014, Virtual Regatta organized the virtual version of the Volvo Ocean Race.

== Virtual Regatta Inshore ==
=== Game play ===
Virtual Regatta Inshore in an online regatta simulator based on short course racing. Races are between 5 and 10 minutes in length. Players have to helm their boats while respecting the official rules of the races. Weather conditions and downwind agitation (wind shadow) are realistic.

The rules of the races are an adapted version of Racing Rules of Sailing used for the real world sport. The performance and behaviour of the boats are taken from the real polar charts from racing boat constructors. In partnership with main sports governing body World Sailing the first eSailing World Championship was held in 2018 and is now an annual series with over 50000 participant worldwide culminating in a live grand final.

As of 2020 the Inshore version of the game had:

- 700,000 registered players
- 226 countries represented
- 2.4 million races per year
- 18 water bodies recreated virtually
- 11 boat classes

=== Pinnacle Event - Olympic Virtual Series ===
In 2021 the IOC along with 5 international sports federation are hosting the first IOC endorsed e sports event which included World Sailing utilising the virtual regatta platform.
