= 4Kings =

British esports clan

- Short name: 4K
- Divisions: Call of Duty; Counter-Strike; Counter-Strike: Source; FIFA; Quake; Return to Castle Wolfenstein; Shootmania; Team Fortress 2 Unreal Tournament 3 Warcraft III; World of Warcraft
- Founded: 1997
- Disbanded: 2013
- Location: United Kingdom
- Manager: Andreas "Fisk" Johansson; Philip Wride; Zommy

4Kings or Four Kings was a professional esports organization established in 1997 and based in the United Kingdom. It was operated by 4K UK Ltd and managed by Toby Aldridge. The organization was particularly known for its Warcraft III team, which won the ESL WC3L Series on four occasions.

In late 2007, the section that signed players such as Grubby Schenkhuizen and Yoan "ToD" Merlo was dissolved due to financial problems.

== History ==
Established in 1997, 4Kings was formed as a Quake 1 clan playing in the QuakeWorld client.

Under the management of "Zommy", the clan expanded into games such as Quake III, Warcraft III, Return to Castle Wolfenstein, and Counter-Strike, becoming one of the well-known esports teams of its time.

After being sponsored by Intel for six years, 4Kings gained a new main sponsor in 2008 with Packard Bell.

In July 2008, the signing of a Finnish Counter-Strike team signalled the clan's return to the global market.

Following sponsorship changes and internal restructuring, several teams left the organization, and management was replaced in 2009.

The organization gradually became inactive and has not operated since the end of 2013, and its official website is no longer active.

The team had players competing in Return to Castle Wolfenstein, Enemy Territory: Quake Wars, Quake III, Warcraft III, Unreal Tournament, Counter-Strike, Team Fortress 2, and ShootMania Storm.
