= Xantares =

Turkish professional Counter-Strike 2 player

XANTARES
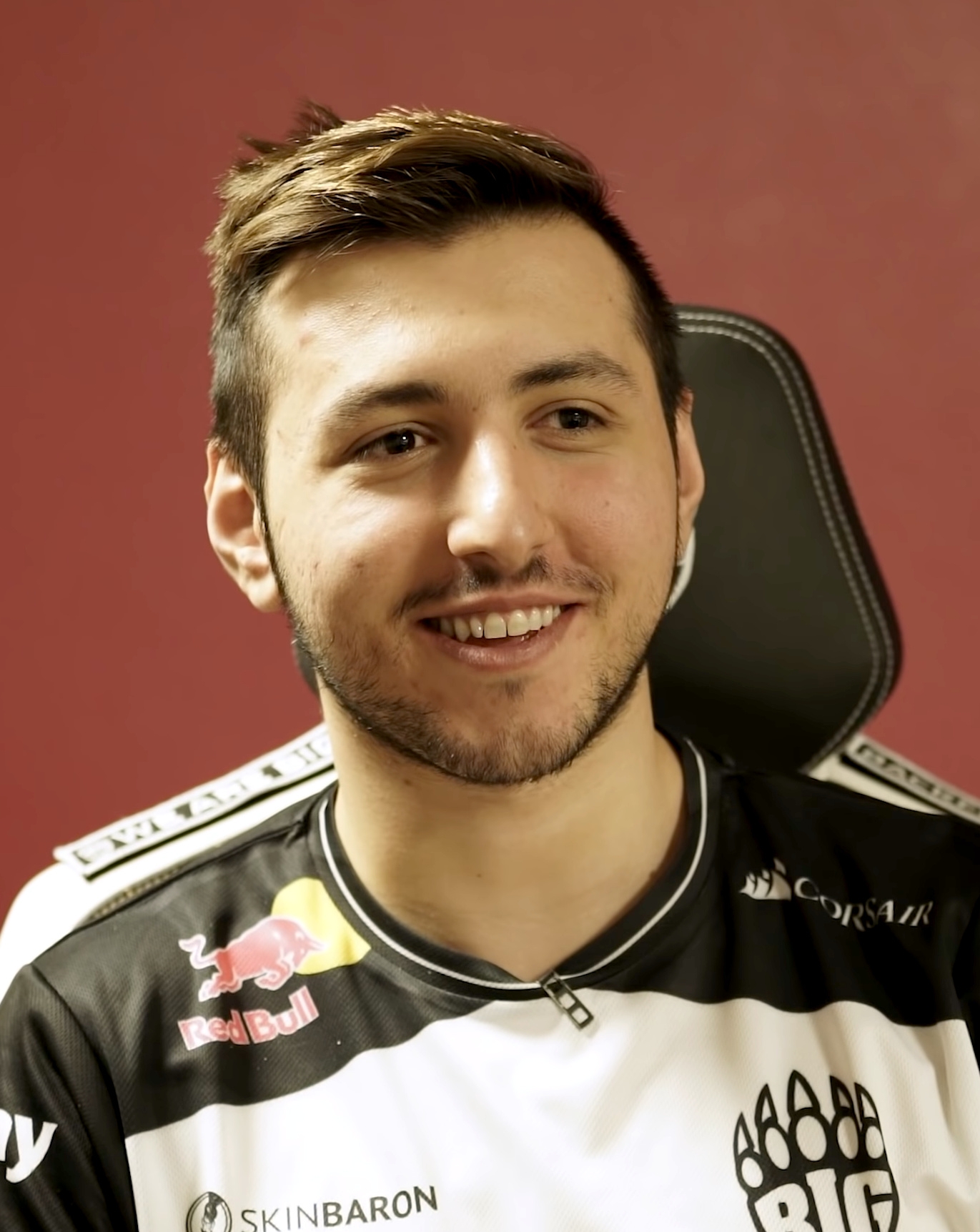
- Dörtkardeş in 2020

Personal information
- Name: İsmailcan Dörtkardeş
- Born: 7 August 1995 (age 31); Fatih, Istanbul
- Nationality: Turkish

Current team
- Team: Aurora Gaming
- Role: Entry-fragger
- Game(s): Counter-Strike: Global Offensive; Counter-Strike 2

Team history
- 2012–2014: HWA Gaming
- 2015–2018: Space Soldiers
- 2018–2021: BIG Clan
- 2021–2025: Eternal Fire
- 2025–present: Aurora Gaming

Career highlights and awards
- 2x HLTV Top 20 Player of the Year (2024, 2025); 2x HLTV MVP

İsmailcan Dörtkardeş (born 7 August 1995), better known as Xantares (stylized in all caps), is a Turkish professional Counter-Strike 2 player for Aurora Gaming. Playing as an entry-fragger, Xantares is considered the best Turkish FPS player. He started his career in Turkish Space Soldiers in 2015, where he played until late 2018. After signing for BIG Clan later that year, the team climbed up in HLTV's world ranking and peaked at number 1 in July 2020 after winning several tournaments. In August 2021, he returned to Turkey to play with Eternal Fire.

== Early and personal life ==
İsmailcan Dörtkardeş was born on 7 August 1995 in Fatih, Istanbul. In a 2016 interview with Sabah, Dörtkardeş explained that his future teammates had to convince his parents to let him sign the contract that they all got offered by Space Soldiers. On 13 July 2021, he underwent a hand surgery to prevent sweating.

== Career ==
=== Space Soldiers (2015–2018) ===
Dörtkardeş joined Space Soldiers when it formed on 17 January 2015. In October 2016, the Turkish National CS:GO Team consisting of Dörtkardeş and other Space Soldiers players won the World Championship 2016 after beating Argentina in the grand final. In September 2017, Space Soldiers qualified for ESL One Cologne 2017. In the first match, the team beat SK Gaming, the number 1 ranked team at the time.

In January 2018, the team qualified to the ELEAGUE Major: Boston 2018 and became the first Turkish team to qualify for a CS:GO Major. XANTARES, his teammates and the team got their own stickers added to the game as a result. Space Soldiers was eliminated without making it to the play-offs. The team came second in the WESG 2017 World Finals after losing to fnatic in the grand final. XANTARES was one of the 4 MVP candidates for the event, which went to Freddy "KRIMZ" Johansson instead. On 13 October 2018, all players parted their ways with Space Soldiers. After the release of the roster, it was speculated that the players would join SK Gaming. This speculation was shut down by Dörtkardeş on Twitch.

=== BIG Clan (2018–2021) ===
On 22 December 2018, Dörtkardeş joined an international team for the first time by signing with Germany-based BIG Clan. He left ex-Space Soldiers due to "internal and internet issues within the team". During a Twitch stream the next month, he revealed that he got offers from FaZe Clan and Mousesports, before joining BIG.

In July 2020, BIG Clan won cs_summit 6 Europe, winning 2–1 against Team Vitality in the grand-final. During the tournament, BIG also notably defeated FaZe Clan 2–0 early on, with ESPN Brazil saying that Dörtkardeş gave "FaZe a lot of headache" during the match. The team was ranked as the best team in the world that month by HLTV.

On 30 September 2020, Dörtkardeş extended his contract with the team until the end of 2021. He was banned from Twitch in June 2021 for the second time. On 5 August 2021, Dörtkardeş was listed for transfer by BIG. He was released from his contract later on 13 August.

=== Eternal Fire (2021–2025) ===
On 13 August 2021, it was announced that Dörtkardeş would join the newly-formed Eternal Fire with a majority-Turkish line-up. The team failed to qualify for PGL Major Stockholm 2021, missing the biggest event of the year. In April 2022, the team qualified for a Major for the first time: PGL Antwerp 2022, but got eliminated by Made in Brazil in the Challengers stage. Eternal Fire missed the subsequent Major after going out 1–3 in the European qualifier, despite Xantares performing well.

In February 2023, the team won the CCT Central Europe Malta Finals. Later that month, they played at ESL Pro League Season 17, exiting the tournament in the group stages. Xantares, together with 2 other Eternal Fire players, was in the top 10 highest-rated players of the group stage.

In March 2024, Eternal Fire took a step further by reaching the quarter finals in the PGL Major Copenhagen after upsetting top teams as Team Vitality and FaZe Clan in the Elimination Stage. The Turkish team then lost to the upcoming champion, NaVi. Six months later, XANTARES and his teammates two finals in S-Tier events, the highest level of competition except Majors, in the Bet Boom Dacha and the most recognized ESL Pro League Season 20, beating once again Team Vitality and pushing NaVi to a decider in the grand final. They disbanded the entire Eternal Fire roster due to financial issues related to sponsorship, and XANTARES, along with the Eternal Fire lineup, transferred to Aurora Gaming.

=== Aurora Gaming (2025-present) ===
In May 2025, Aurora Gaming claimed 3rd place at PGL Astana 2025, along with 2nd place at Esports World Cup 2025, and 1st place at PGL Masters Bucharest 2025, making it their first ever trophy and LAN tournament win. This was Xantares career first HLTV LAN MVP, where he had an average HLTV rating of 1.27 throughout the tournament.

== Play-style ==
Xantares is an entry-fragger, attempting to take the first kill by making early plays. He uses his monitor very close to his face. Dotesports considers him "the leading force behind his teams' successes" and the "best Turkish player of all time".

== Honours ==
=== Space Soldiers ===
- (gold) GeForce Cup 2017.
- (silver) WESG 2017 World Finals
- (gold) DreamHack Open Austin 2018

=== BIG Clan ===
- (bronze) ELEAGUE Invitational 2019
- (gold) DreamHack Masters Spring 2020 Europe
- (gold) cs_summit 6 Europe
- (gold) DreamHack Open Summer 2020 (MVP)
- (gold) CCT Central Europe Malta Finals

=== Aurora Gaming ===
- (bronze) PGL Astana 2025
- (silver) Esports World Cup 2025
- (gold) PGL Masters Bucharest 2025 (MVP)
