= ESL Pro League Season 7 =

ESL Pro League
- 2018

Tournament information
- Sport: Counter-Strike: Global Offensive
- Location: Dallas, Texas, United States
- Dates: February 13, 2018–May 20, 2018
- Administrator: Electronic Sports League (ESL)
- Venue: Verizon Theatre
- Teams: 40 teams
- Purse: ~US$1,593,478.93

Final positions
- Champions: Astralis
- 1st runners-up: Team Liquid
- 2nd runners-up: FaZe Clan; Natus Vincere
- MVP: Peter "dupreeh" Rothmann

ESL Pro League Season 7 (shortened as EPL Season 7) is a Counter-Strike: Global Offensive tournament run by ESL. It is the seventh season of the ESL Pro League. Teams from two continents, North America and Europe will compete in fourteen team leagues to attempt to qualify for the Finals. For the first time, the EPL finals returned to a location that had already hosted an EPL final as ESL decided to head back to Dallas and will host the finals at the Verizon Theatre. The regular season started on February 13, 2018, and ended on April 26, 2018. Europe's season started with Astralis overrunning Team LDLC.com. North America's season kicked off with the Season 6 champion SK Gaming edging out the Season 4 champion Cloud9. South America's season began with Dereguedere tying with W7M Gaming. Asia-Pacific's season started with B.O.O.T-dream[S]cape defeating Grayhound Gaming. Asia-Pacific's season ended with MVP PK defeating Grayhound Gaming in three maps to take first seed in the APAC region. South America's season will end with Team Wild taking on W7M Gaming. Europe's season ended with HellRaisers defeating North to take the last European spot in the finals. North America's season ended with Ghost Gaming defeating compLexity Gaming.

The finals started on May 14, 2018, and ended on May 20, 2018, in Dallas, Texas, United States. Astralis defeated Team Liquid in four maps to claim the organization's first title.

This tournament is the ninth tournament of the first season of the Intel Grand Slam, which is a list of premier tournaments run by ESL and DreamHack. The first team to win four titles would earn an extra $1,000,000. SK Gaming (ESL One Cologne 2017 and ESL Pro League Season 6) and FaZe Clan (ESL One New York 2017 and Intel Extreme Masters Season XIII – Sydney) lead the way with two titles each. G2 Esports (DreamHack Masters Malmö 2017), Ninjas in Pyjamas (Intel Extreme Masters Season XII – Oakland), Fnatic (Intel Extreme Masters Season XII - World Championship), and Astralis (DreamHack Masters Marseille 2018) have one title each.

== Format ==
The seventh season saw a major change. ESL announced on February 20, 2018, that the EPL Finals would be expanded to 16 teams. On March 5, 2018, EPL announced the creation of the Asia-Pacific (APAC) division, which would divide teams up into three regions and then feature eight teams in an APAC regional. EPL later announced on March 15, 2018, that a South American division, called the LA LEAGUE, would be created and would feature eight teams from a sixteen team closed qualifier. This caused some mild controversy as the four best South American teams – SK Gaming, Luminosity Gaming, Não Tem Como, and No Tenemos Nada – were already playing in North America's league.

North American and Europe featured the top 11 teams from last season's ESL Pro League Season 5, one team from the ESEA Season 26: Premier Finals and two teams from the Season 5 Relegation, which featured the bottom two teams from each league from Season 5 and the two runner-ups from the ESEA Season 26: Premier Finals. The Asia-Pacific region featured three teams from the Australia and New Zealand region; three teams from the China region, which includes teams from China, Hong Kong, Japan, Mongolia, and South Korea; and two teams from the Southeast Asia region, which includes teams from Thailand, Indonesia, Taiwan, and eight other countries. South America featured a closed qualifier eight invited teams, four teams from an open qualifier, and four teams from a second open qualifier.

During the regular season, each team will play every team in its league in two best-of-ones. The winner of each game will receive three points and the loser of each game will receive zero points. If a game ends to overtime, the winner will receive two points and the loser will receive one point. The top six teams by the end of the season from each region will head to the Finals. Teams that placed seventh through eleventh will not head to the playoffs but will secure a spot in next season's EPL. Teams that placed twelve and thirteenth will go through a relegation phase, in which those teams will be placed in a four team double elimination bracket, along with teams that placed second and third in the ESEA Season 26: Premier Division of their region. The top two teams move on to EPL Season 7. The winner of ESEA Season 26: Premier Division will automatically be invited to EPL Season 7. The team that came in fourteenth place will automatically be demoted to ESEA Season 28: Premier Division. Originally, the North American division had fourteen teams like Europe, but after Counter Logic Gaming released its team and Misfits decided to not renew the contracts of three players, the two teams forfeited their pro league licenses.

There were also two periods in which no matches were played. After week 1, no matches were played for three weeks due to StarLadder i-League StarSeries Season 4 in Ukraine featuring twelve EPL teams and Intel Extreme Masters Season XII – World Championship in Poland featuring eleven EPL teams in the two events. One last break from EPL matches took place as thirteen EPL teams attended DreamHack Masters Marseille 2018 in France.

The Finals was initially going to have only twelve teams, but on February 20, 2018, it was announced that the Finals will consist of sixteen teams. Europe would be awarded seven slots in the finals and North America would have six slots based on having fewer teams. ESL Senior Vice President of Product Ulrich Schulze said that with sixteen teams in the EPL Finals "comes with geographical expansion", indicating that teams from Asian and the Oceania regions would also be part of the EPL Finals. The two regions were determined to be the Asia-Pacific region and an undetermined region. The APAC region would be awarded two slots and the South America region would be awarded one slot.

== Qualifiers ==
=== Season 6 relegation ===
Before each season, three spots need to be filled up in each league. The team that came in last place in each league is automatically relegated to the premier division for the following season, season 25. Meanwhile, the winner of the premier division's season 26 is automatically promoted to the professional division. For the last two spots, the two runner ups of season 26 of the premier division will be placed in a four team, best of three, double elimination bracket against the teams that placed twelfth and thirteenth in EPL Season 6. The final two teams are promoted to EPL Season 7 and the other two teams are demoted to ESEA Premier Division Season 27.

==== North America relegation ====
North America's league featured an unusual case. Immortals decided to drop out of EPL after Vito "kNgV-" Giuseppe's contract was cut and Henrique "HEN1" Teles and Lucas "LUCAS1" Teles's contracts were bought out by 100 Thieves along with Lincoln "fnx" Lau. Immortals tried to rebuild its team with its last two members in Lucas "steel" Lopes and Ricardo "boltz" Prass by bringing in João "horvy" Horvath, Lucas "destinyy" Bullo, and Caio "zqk" Fonseca. However, boltz was later loaned to SK Gaming and was projected to become part of the permanent roster, so the team brought in Bruno "shz" Martinelli. However, Team Liquid bought out steel, horvy announced that he would go inactive in search of a better team, and destinyy and shz went back to their old team Tempo Storm. zqk then left the team to join the Brazilian-based YeaH! Gaming. 100 Thieves potentially could have bought Immortals's Pro League license, but the CS:GO project fell through as unspecified members were having immigration issues and then 100 Thieves released its CS:GO squad and then the team announced it would not reach out to any CS:GO team for 2018. Therefore, Ghost Gaming, which was going to be relegated to the Premier League, got a second chance to get back into Pro League by taking Immortals's spot in the Season 6 relegation phase.

Season 6 Relegation

- Rogue (Season 6 #13)
- Ghost Gaming (Season 6 #14)
- Rise Nation (ESEA Season 26 #2)
- GX (ESEA Season 26 #3)

Upper round 1
1	Rogue	2
4	GX	0
2	Ghost Gaming	2
3	Rise Nation	1
Lower round 1
4	GX	0
3	Rise Nation	2

Upper final
1	Rogue	0
2	Ghost Gaming	2
Lower final
1	Rogue	2
3	Rise Nation	0

Qualified
2	Ghost Gaming
1	Rogue

==== Europe relegation ====
Season 6 Relegation

- Natus Vincere (Season 6 #12)
- GODSENT (Season 6 #13)
- eXtatus (ESEA Season 26 #2)
- Space Soldiers (ESEA Season 26 #3)

Upper round 1
1	Natus Vincere	2
4	Space Soldiers	1
2	GODSENT	2
3	eXtatus	1
Lower round 1
4	Space Soldiers	2
3	eXtatus	0

Upper final
1	Natus Vincere	2
2	GODSENT	1
Lower final
2	GODSENT	0
4	Space Soldiers	2

Qualified
1	Natus Vincere
4	Space Soldiers

=== Asia-Pacific qualification ===
Each qualifier featured eight teams. Each region played a double elimination, best of three, eight team bracket.

==== Australia-New Zealand ====
The Australia-New Zealand (ANZ) season matches will take place from April 4 to 5 and April 9 to 10. The top three will qualify for the APAC finals.

- Chiefs eSports Club (Invited)
- Corvidae (Invited)
- Dark Sided (Invited)
- Grayhound Gaming (Invited)
- ORDER (Invited)
- Tainted Minds (Invited)
- Legacy Esports (Open Qualifier 1)
- Lucky7 Gaming (Open Qualifier 2)

Upper round 1	Upper round 2	Qualified
ORDER	2
Lucky7 Gaming	0
ORDER	2
Chiefs Esports Club	0
Chiefs Esports Club	2
Corvidae	0
ORDER
Grayhound Gaming
Dark Sided	0
Grayhound Gaming	2
Grayhound Gaming	0
Tainted Minds	0
Tainted Minds	2
Legacy Esports	0
Lower round 1	Lower round 2	Lower round 3	Qualified
Tainted Minds	2
Lucky7 Gaming	0	Corvidae	0	Tainted Minds
Corvidae	2	Tainted Minds	2
Chiefs eSports Club	0
Chiefs Esports Club	2
Dark Sided	1	Legacy Esports	0
Legacy Esports	2

==== China ====
The China region consists of the East Asia countries. The China season will take place from March 27 to 29. The top three will qualify for the APAC finals.

- 5Power Club (Invited)
- Eclipse (Invited)
- Flash Gaming (Invited)
- MVP PK (Invited)
- SZ Absolute (Invited)
- The MongolZ (Invited)
- Roar eSports (Open Qualifier 1)
- EHOME (Open Qualifier 2)

Upper round 1	Upper round 2	Qualified
Flash Gaming	2
EHOME	0
Flash Gaming	0
MVP PK	2
Eclipse	1
MVP PK	2
MVP PK
The MongolZ
5Power Club	2
SZ Absolute	0
5Power Club	0
The MongolZ	2
The MongolZ	2
Roar eSports	0
Lower round 1	Lower round 2	Lower round 3	Qualified
5Power Club	1
EHOME	0	Eclipse	2	Flash Gaming
Eclipse	2	Eclipse	0
Flash Gaming	2
Flash Gaming	2
SZ Absolute	2	SZ Absolute	0
Roar eSports	1

==== Southeast Asia ====
The Southeast Asia season matches will take place from April 6 to 8. The top two will advance to the APAC finals.

- Alpha Red (Invited)
- B.O.O.T-dream[S]cape (Invited)
- Fire Dragoon E-sports (Invited)
- GameTV (Invited)
- Recca Esports (Invited)
- Signature Gaming (Invited)
- Beyond Esports (Open Qualifier 1)
- Mineski (Open Qualifier 2)

Upper round 1	Upper round 2	Upper final	Qualified
B.O.O.T-d[S]	2
Mineski	0
B.O.O.T-d[S]	2
Recca Esports	0
Fire Dragoon E-sports	0
Recca Esports	2
B.O.O.T-d[S]	1
Signature Gaming	2
GameTV	0
Signature Gaming	2
Signature Gaming	2
Beyond Esports	0
Alpha Red	0
Beyond Esports	2	Signature Gaming
B.O.O.T-d[S]
Lower round 1	Lower round 2	Lower round 3	Lower final
Beyond Esports	0
Mineski	2	Mineski	2	B.O.O.T-d[S]	2
Fire Dragoon E-Sports	1	Mineski	1	Recca Esports	0
Recca Esports	2
Recca Esports	2
GameTV	0	Alpha Red	0
Alpha Red	2

=== LA LEAGUE closed qualifier ===
The LA LEAGUE will start off with a closed qualifier. ESL will invite eight top teams from all over South America. To fill out the sixteen team closed qualifier, ESL will also host two open qualifiers, from which four teams from each open qualifier will qualify for the closed qualifier. Eight teams will qualify for the South American season. To avoid any consequences with traveling, ESL announced that it would only allow teams in which all players have acquired US visas. Each team was seeded, with the invited teams earning the higher seeds, and set to up play one team in a best of three. The winners of those matchups moved to LA LEAGUE.

- Furia eSports (Invited)
- Furious Gaming (Invited)
- Isurus Gaming (Invited)
- Keyd Stars Female (Invited)
- Sharks Esports (Invited)
- Virtue Gaming (Invited)
- W7M Gaming (Invited)
- YeaH! Gaming (Invited)
- C4 Gaming (Open Qualifier 1)
- Dereguedere (Open Qualifier 1)
- INTZ eSports (Open Qualifier 1)
- TEAMMATE (Open Qualifier 1)
- AEON Gaming (Open Qualifier 2)
- Andes eSports (Open Qualifier 2)
- Brasil Gaming House (Open Qualifier 2)
- Team Wild (Open Qualifier 2)

First round
W7M Gaming	2
Brasil Gaming House	0
Sharks Esports	2
Andes eSports	0
Virtue Gaming	1
Dereguedere	2
Keyd Stars Female	0
Team Wild	2
YeaH! Gaming	2
AEON Gaming	0
Furia eSports	2
TEAMMATE	0
Isurus Gaming	2
C4 Gaming	0
Furious Gaming	2
INTZ eSports	1

Qualified
W7M Gaming
Sharks Esports
Dereguedere
Team Wild
Yeah! Gaming
Furia eSports
Isurus Gaming
Furious Gaming

== Teams ==
North America

- OpTic Gaming (Season 6 #1)
- SK Gaming (Season 6 #2)
- Team Liquid (Season 6 #3)
- NRG Esports (Season 6 #4)
- Luminosity Gaming (Season 6 #6)
- Cloud9 (Season 6 #8)
- Renegades (Season 6 #9)
- Splyce (Season 6 #10)
- compLexity Gaming (Season 6 #11)
- Team Dignitas (ESEA Premier Season 26)
- Ghost Gaming (Season 6 Relegation)
- Rogue (Season 6 Relegation)

Europe

- Fnatic (Season 6 #1)
- North (Season 6 #2)
- FaZe Clan (Season 6 #3)
- Astralis (Season 6 #4)
- Ninjas in Pyjamas (Season 6 #5)
- HellRaisers (Season 6 #6)
- G2 Esports (Season 6 #7)
- Team EnVyUs (Season 6 #8)
- mousesports (Season 6 #9)
- Heroic (Season 6 #10)
- Team LDLC.com (Season 6 #11)
- AGO Esports (ESEA Premier Season 26)
- Natus Vincere (Season 6 Relegation)
- Space Soldiers (Season 6 Relegation)

Asia-Pacific

- Grayhound Gaming (ANZ #1-2)
- ORDER (ANZ #1-2)
- Tainted Minds (ANZ #3)
- MVP PK (China #1-2)
- The MongolZ (China #1-2)
- SZ Absolute (China replacement)
- Signature Gaming (SEA #1)
- B.O.O.T-dream[S]cape (SEA #2)

South America

- ~~Dereguedere~~
- Furia eSports
- Furious Gaming
- Isurus Gaming
- Sharks Esports
- Team Wild
- W7M Gaming
- ~~YeaH! Gaming~~

== North America ==
=== Broadcast talent ===
The season 7 talent was announced on February 6, 2018.

Host

- Tres "Stunna" Saranthus

Commentators

- Danny "dK" Kim
- Jordan "Elfishguy" Mays
- Jason "moses" O'Toole
- Mitch "Pili" Pilipowski
- Harry "JustHarry" Russell
- Kevin "KaRath" Zhu

Analysts

- Halvor "vENdetta" Gulestøl
- Jacob "Pimp" Winneche

=== Standings ===
The North American final standings are shown below. Each team's in-game leader is shown first. Rosters reflect what they look like by the end of the regular season. For instance, SK Gaming replaced Epitácio "TACO" de Melo with Jake "Stewie2K" Yip and Team Liquid replaced Lucas "steel" Lopes with TACO in the middle of the season. Thus, Stewie2K's name is shown with SK Gaming's lineup and TACO's name is shown with Team Liquid's lineup.

Team Liquid was the first team to book a spot at the Dallas finals after defeating Splyce in both games as arguably the best team in North America would play in front of its home crowd. NRG Esports was arguably the hottest team by the end of the season and was the second North American team to book a spot in the finals after defeating compLexity Gaming in both maps. OpTic Gaming was the next to earn a spot with two wins against Team Dignitas. Renegades clinched the next day with two wins against the same Dignitas team. Cloud9 was able to take a map off of Rogue to head back to the EPL finals after missing it a season ago. Rogue needed to win all of its games in order to have a chance at a flight to Dallas, but was unable to do so. The defending champions SK Gaming needed to wait until the last day of the season to clinch a spot after Luminosity Gaming lost to NRG Esports and SK defeated Renegades to take the last spot in North America. Rogue was also in contention of making the finals after finishing nearly in last place last season, and had defeated Team Dignitas and needed SK to lose just one map to the Renegades. However, SK barely took the first map in overtime and dominated Renegades in the second to secure a spot.

Team Dignitas had an abysmal season after going winless until week six and only taking two wins and was relegated to the Premier League. After getting last place last season, Ghost Gaming did better this season to stay in ESL Pro League for season eight. Meanwhile, compLexity Gaming had to play in a relegation match after placing in the bottom for the first time in its EPL history. Splyce was also forced to play in relegation matches as reports of Splyce releasing its CS:GO team emerged.

Final Standings
Place	Prize Money	Team	W–L	OT W–L	RD	Pts	Roster	Coach
1st	TBD	Team Liquid	19–1	1–1	+111	60	nitr0, EliGE, NAF, Twistzz, TACO	zews
2nd	TBD	NRG Esports	15–4	2–1	+118	50	FugLy, Brehze, nahtE, CeRq, daps	Immi
3rd	TBD	OpTic Gaming	13–8	1–0	+45	41	stanislaw, cajunb, gade, k0nfig, ShahZaM	ImaPet
4th	TBD	Cloud9	12–7	1–2	+25	40	FNS, tarik, autimatic, RUSH, Skadoodle	valens
5th	TBD	Renegades	11–6	2–3	+56	40	Nifty, AZR, jks, USTILO, jkaem	kassad
6th	TBD	SK Gaming	11–10	1–0	+31	35	FalleN, boltz, coldzera, fer, Stewie2K	
7th	US$27,000	Rogue	11–11	0–0	−1	33	cadiaN, Hiko, SicK, gMd, vice	
8th	US$23,000	Luminosity Gaming	9–12	0–1	−26	28	PKL, NEKIZ, SHOOWTiME, steel, yeL	zakk
9th	US$19,000	Ghost Gaming	7–14	0–1	−77	22	CoNnOrRr93, Subroza, Wardell, seb, Stanley	MAiNLiNE
10th	US$17,500	compLexity Gaming	6–14	1–1	−57	21	Slemmy, androidx23, ptr, yay, dephh	Rambo
11th	US$15,000	Splyce	6–15	1–0	−84	20	DAVEY, Drone, roca, XotiC, Semphis	Eley
12th	US$11,500	Team Dignitas	2–20	0–0	−141	6	a2z, Grim, mitch, roca, Voltage	shinobi

North America Results

Results
	OpTic	SK	Liquid	NRG	LG	C9	RNG	SPY	coL	dig	Ghost	Rogue
OpTic		16–2; 13–16	FF-W; FF-W^{1}	7–16; 16–14	16–8; 16–7	8–16; 16–4	19–16; 8–16	16–3; 16–12	16–7; 16–14	16–13; 16–9	4–16; 16–13	16–7; 3–16
SK	2–16; 16–13		FF-W; FF-W^{2}	10–16; 4–16	16–8; 8–16	16–13; 7–16	19–15; 16–3	FF-W; 16–11^{3}	6–16; 16–2	16–4; 16–4	16–8; 16–10	16–12; 14–16
Liquid	W-FF; W-FF^{1}	W-FF; W-FF^{2}		20–22; 16–7	16–10; 11–16	16–6; 19–16	16–12; 16–9	16–6; 16–2	16–6; 16–6	16–8; 16–10	16–14; 16–4	16–10; 16–14
NRG	16–7; 14–16	16–10; 16–4	22–20; 7–16		16–3; 16–4	11–16; 16–7	5–16; 17–19	16–6; 16–9	16–4; 16–9	16–13; 16–3	19–17; 16–4	16–5; 16–9
LG	8–16; 7–16	8–16; 16–8	10–16; 16–11	3–16; 4–16		3–16; 7–16	17–19; 16–9	16–3; 13–16	6–16; 16–10	16–4; 16–9	16–3; 12–16	10–16; 16–10
C9	16–8; 4–16	13–16; 16–7	6–16; 16–19	16–11; 7–16	16–3; 16–7		16–9; 19–17	6–16; 16–13	17–19; 16–11	16–14; 16–5	16–13; 14–16	16–8; 6–16
RNG	16–19; 16–8	15–19; 3–16	12–16; 9–16	16–5; 19–17	19–17; 9–16	9–16; 17–19		16–4; 16–8	16–3; 16–10	16–10; 16–12	16–3; 16–3	11–16; 16–6
SPY	3–16; 12–16	W-FF; 11–16^{3}	6–16; 2–16	5–16; 9–16	3–16; 16–13	16–6; 13–16	4–16; 8–16		16–11; 19–17	16–9; 8–16	14–16; 10–16	11–16; 16–6
coL	7–16; 14–16	16–6; 2–16	6–16; 6–16	4–16; 9–16	16–6; 10–16	19–17; 11–16	3–16; 10–16	11–16; 17–19		16–8; 16–10	16–8; 13–16	6–16; 16–3
dig	13–16; 9–16	4–16; 4–16	8–16; 10–16	13–16; 3–16	4–16; 9–16	14–16; 5–16	10–16; 12–16	9–16; 16–8	8–16; 10–16		16–12; 11–16	6–16; 5–16
Ghost	16–4; 13–16	8–16; 10–16	14–16; 4–16	17–19; 4–16	3–16; 16–12	13–16; 16–14	3–16; 3–16	16–14; 16–10	8–16; 16–13	12–16; 16–11		6–16; 14–16
Rogue	7–16; 16–3	12–16; 16–14	10–16; 14–16	6–16; 9–16	16–10; 10–16	8–16; 16–6	16–11; 6–16	16–11; 6–16	16–6; 3–16	16–6; 16–5	16–6; 16–14	

^{1}OpTic Gaming forfeited both matches to Team Liquid as most of the team was in Denmark at the time.

^{2}SK Gaming forfeits both matches to Team Liquid as the team was in Germany for a bootcamp, thus having a high ping that makes the match extremely difficult to play for SK Gaming. However, SK elected to play against NRG Esports the next day.

^{3}SK Gaming forfeits its first match to Splyce due to an Esports Championship Series game going into a fourth overtime against Cloud9, resulting in SK Gaming being late for its first EPL match against Splyce.

== Europe ==
=== Broadcast talent ===
Host

- Alex "Machine" Richardson

Commentators

- Alex "Snodz" Byfield
- Hugo Byron
- Henry "HenryG" Greer
- Jack "Jacky" Peters
- Matthew "Sadokist" Trivett

Analysts

- Chad "SPUNJ" Burchill
- Janko "YNk" Paunović

=== Standings ===
The European final standings are shown below. Each team's in-game leaders are shown first. Rosters reflect what they look like by the end of the regular season. For instance, G2 Esports had Richard "shox" Papillon at the start of the season, but was later replaced by Oscar "mixwell" Cañellas in the middle of the season, so mixwell's name is shown below.

Space Soldiers was the second team overall and the first European team to qualify for the Dallas global finals after defeating HellRaisers in both maps. Ninjas in Pyjamas clinched the following day after taking the second map against North. Natus Vincere and Astralis also clinched when Ninjas in Pyjamas defeated North. FaZe Clan was able to clinch its spot in the finals after defeating Space Soldiers. North, HellRaisers, and Heroic fought for the last spot in the finals. Heroic was able to defeat AGO Gaming in regulation in the first game, but the second game that went to overtime meant that Heroic needed HellRaisers and North to have both of their games go to overtime. HellRaisers and North faced off in the last day of the season and the first game went to overtime, which North won. However, HellRaisers was able to dominate the second half of the second map and win in regulation, sending HellRaisers to its second consecutive finals and eliminating Heroic and North. HellRaisers won the tiebreaker between Heroic based on having more point in the head-to-head (4–2). On May 9, however, HallRaisers announced that it would not be able to attend the event due to Özgür "w0xic" Eker's visa issues, so Heroic would replace the last spot at the Dallas finals.

Last year's Europe winner, Fnatic, was barely able to hold on to a guaranteed spot for next season. Team EnVyUs, after placing a solid eighth last season, had to play in a regulation series along with AGO Gaming. Team LDLC.com could not qualify for the next season after barely placing eleventh for two seasons in a row and would be sent down to play in the Premier League for next season. mousesports was able to clinch the top spot in the Europe league after defeating Team EnVyUs in both maps and winning the tiebreaker between Ninjas in Pyjamas.

Final Standings
Place	Prize Money	Team	W–L	OT W–L	RD	Pts	Roster	Coach
1st	TBD	mousesports	16–8	2–0	+68	52	chrisJ, oskar, ropz, STYKO, suNny	lmbt
2nd	TBD	Ninjas in Pyjamas	16–8	1–2	+52	52	dennis, draken, f0rest, GeT RiGhT, REZ	pita
3rd	TBD	Natus Vincere	15–8	3–0	+58	51	Zeus, Edward, s1mple, electronic, flamie	kane
4th	TBD	FaZe Clan	15–9	0–2	+38	47	karrigan, GuardiaN, NiKo, Xizt, rain	RobbaN
5th	TBD	Space Soldiers	15–10	0–1	+70	46	MAJ3R, Calyx, ngiN, paz, XANTARES	hardstyle
6th	TBD	Astralis	13–9	2–2	+55	45	gla1ve, dev1ce, dupreeh, Magisk, Xyp9x	zonic
7th	US$27,000	HellRaisers	11–11	2–2	−25	39	ANGE1, bondik, DeadFox, w0xic, ISSAA	Johnta
8th	US$23,000	Heroic	10–11	4–1	−38	39	Snappi, JUGi, niko, MODDII, RUBINO	peacemaker
9th	US$19,000	North	11–13	2–0	−23	37	MSL, aizy, Kjaerbye, mertz, valde	ave
10th	US$17,500	G2 Esports	11–13	1–1	+15	36	NBK-, apEX, bodyy, kennyS, mixwell	NiaK
11th	US$15,000	Fnatic	10–14	0–2	−12	32	Golden, flusha, JW, KRiMZ, Lekr0	Jumpy
12th	US$11,500	Team EnVyUs	8–17	0–1	−63	25	Happy, hAdji, kioShiMa, RpK, ScreaM	maLeK
13th	US$8,000	AGO Esports	7–17	0–2	−76	23	TOAO, Furlan, GruBy, phr, snatchie	miNIr0x
14th	US$4,000	Team LDLC.com	5–16	2–3	−119	22	Maniac, ALEX, DEVIL, LOGAN, to1nou	Ozstrik3r

Europe Results

Results
	Fnatic	North	FaZe	Astralis	NiP	HR	G2	nV	mouz	Heroic	LDLC	AGO	Na'Vi	SS
Fnatic		9–16; 11–16	9–16; 16–5	9–16; 9–16	16–10; 16–14	19–22; 11–16	16–10; 16–10	16–11; 12–16	7–16; 11–16	16–5; 8–16	16–10; 14–16	14–16; 16–11	22–25; 13–16	11–16; 14–16
North	16–9; 16–11		8–16; 16–5	4–16; 11–16	19–15; 6–16	19–16; 11–16	16–12; 16–13	16–14; 3–16	8–16; 16–13	11–16; 6–16	16–6; 11–16	16–5; 16–4	8–16; 16–10	9–16; 13–16
FaZe	16–9; 5–16	16–8; 5–16		14–16; 20–22	8–16; 14–16	16–7; 16–12	16–11; 16–13	5–16; 16–6	10–16; 12–16	16–9; 16–8	16–9; 16–12	16–7; 16–11	6–16; 23–25	16–5; 16–8
Astralis	16–9; 16–9	16–4; 16–11	16–14; 22–20		8–16; 11–16	16–19; 16–6	16–12; 14–16	16–3; 14–16	9–16; 16–14	10–16; 14–16	16–5; 16–5	10–16; 19–15	16–19; 11–16	16–14; 16–4
NiP	10–16; 14–16	15–19; 16–6	16–8; 16–14	16–8; 16–11		16–2; 9–16	16–11; 16–12	14–16; 8–16	8–16; 16–12	16–6; 16–19	16–7; 10–16	16–12; 16–10	16–12; 16–7	19–15; 16–10
HR	22–19; 16–11	16–19; 16–11	7–16; 12–16	19–16; 6–16	2–16; 16–9		7–16; 16–10	16–10; 16–9	4–16; 16–7	16–4; 15–19	16–7; 16–6	9–16; 6–16	6–16; 16–14	6–16; 8–16
G2	10–16; 10–16	12–16; 13–16	11–16; 13–16	12–16; 16–14	11–16; 12–16	16–7; 10–16		16–8; 16–2	17–19; 4–16	16–10; 16–14	16–11; 22–19	16–12; 16–8	13–16; 16–9	5–16; 14–16
nV	11–16; 16–12	14–16; 16–3	16–5; 6–16	3–16; 16–14	16–14; 16–8	10–16; 9–16	8–16; 2–16		11–16; 13–16	14–16; 13–16	13–16; 16–19	16–13; 16–9	10–16; 6–16	12–16; 5–16
mouz	16–7; 16–11	16–8; 13–16	16–10; 16–12	16–9; 14–16	16–8; 12–16	16–4; 7–16	19–17; 16–4	16–11; 16–13		16–5; 14–16	16–13; 19–17	14–16; 16–14	5–16; 16–11	16–14; 16–11
Heroic	5–16; 16–8	16–11; 16–6	9–16; 8–16	16–10; 16–14	6–16; 19–16	4–16; 19–15	10–16; 14–16	16–14; 16–13	5–16; 16–14		16–19; 19–17	16–9; 19–17	16–7; 14–16	1–16; 5–16
LDLC	10–16; 16–14	6–16; 16–11	5–16; 5–16	9–16; 12–16	7–16; 16–10	7–16; 6–16	11–16; 19–22	16–13; 19–16	13–16; 17–19	19–16; 17–19		2–16; 11–16	6–16; 6–16	16–11; 1–16
AGO	16–14; 11–16	5–16; 4–16	7–16; 11–16	16–10; 15–19	12–16; 10–16	16–9; 16–6	12–16; 8–16	13–16; 9–16	16–14; 14–16	9–16; 17–19	16–2; 16–11		9–16; 12–16	4–16; 2–16
Na'Vi	25–22; 16–13	16–8; 10–16	16–6; 25–23	19–16; 16–11	12–16; 7–16	16–6; 14–16	16–13; 9–16	16–10; 16–6	16–5; 11–16	7–16; 16–14	16–6; 16–6	16–9; 16–12		6–16; 16–8
SS	11–16; 16–14	16–9; 16–13	5–16; 8–16	14–16; 4–16	15–19; 10–16	16–6; 16–8	16–5; 16–14	16–12; 16–5	14–16; 11–16	16–1; 16–5	11–16; 16–1	16–4; 16–2	16–6; 8–16	

== Asia-Pacific ==
The newly formed Asia-Pacific division will feature three regions: Australia and New Zealand, China (which is virtually East Asia), and Southeast Asia. Each region had an eight team, double elimination, best of three bracket. Eight teams would qualify for the APAC Finals through their respective regional qualifiers. This stage will take place in Sydney, Australia. The teams were split into two groups of four and played in a standard GSL format. The top teams from each group moved on to a bracket stage. The top two will head to the global finals in Dallas.

=== Broadcast talent ===
Host

- Ben "SandMan" Green

Commentators

- Matthew "Judge" Brand
- Tim "Brainstorm" Dunne
- Jordan "Elfishguy" Mays
- Stuart "sonic" Rayner
- Kevin "KaRath" Zhu

Analysts

- Iain "SnypeR" Turner
- Mohammed "MoeycQ" Tizani

=== Group stage ===
Before the start of group play, SZ Absolute revealed that it would be replacing Flash Gaming because Flash could not obtains visas to Australia. Eclipse, which placed fourth behind Flash in the China qualifier, was also suspected to be facing visa issues. Less than an hour later, it was reported that Flash Gaming would form a new roster with another Chinese-based organization, ViCi Gaming, to create a new Chinese superteam and would play under the banner Vici.Flash.

Group A

Pos	Team	W	L	RF	RA	RD	Pts
1	ORDER	2	0	54	54	0	6
2	MVP PK	2	1	90	74	+16	6
3	Signature Gaming	1	2	70	64	+6	3
4	SZ Absolute	0	2	30	48	−18	0

Group A Results
MVP PK	1	0	SZ Absolute
ORDER	1	0	Signature Gaming
MVP PK	1	2	ORDER
Signature Gaming	2	0	SZ Absolute
MVP PK	2	0	Signature Gaming

Group B

Pos	Team	W	L	RF	RA	RD	Pts
1	Tainted Minds	2	0	48	24	+24	6
2	Grayhound Gaming	2	1	87	59	+28	6
3	B.O.O.T-dream[S]cape	1	2	47	78	−31	3
4	The MongolZ	0	2	36	57	−21	0

Group B Results
Grayhound Gaming	0	1	B.O.O.T-dream[S]cape
The MongolZ	0	1	Tainted Minds
B.O.O.T-dream[S]cape	0	2	Tainted Minds
Grayhound Gaming	2	0	The MongolZ
B.O.O.T-dream[S]cape	0	2	Grayhound Gaming

=== Bracket ===
Semifinals
A1	ORDER	0
B2	Grayhound Gaming	2
B1	Tainted Minds	0
A2	MVP PK	2

Finals
B2	Grayhound Gaming	1
A2	MVP PK	2

=== APAC standings ===
The final standings are shown below. Each team's in-game leader is shown first. The rosters also reflect the rosters that were active at the time of the event. For instance, B.O.O.T-dream[S]cape's Benedict "benkai" Tan could not play with the team in Sydney, so Leslie "Bobosaur" Soen played as a stand-in for the Singaporeans.

Place	Team	Prize Money	Roster	Coach
1st	MVP PK	TBD	solo, glow, hsk, XigN, zeff	termi
2nd	Grayhound Gaming	TBD	erkaSt, dexter, DickStacy, Gratisfaction, malta	
3rd–4th	ORDER	US$12,000	emagine, aliStair, hatz, liazz, sico	
3rd–4th	Tainted Minds	US$12,000	yam, BURNRUOk, INS, ofnu, zewsy	ferg
5th–6th	B.O.O.T-dream[S]cape	US$9,500	ImpressioN, Bobosaur, splashske, Tommy, w1nt3r	dsn
5th–6th	Signature Gaming	US$9,500	qqGod, CigaretteS, Geniuss, Reality, RoLEX	
7th–8th	SZ Absolute	US$7,500	Laz, barce, crow, poem, t4k3J	
7th–8th	The MongolZ	US$7,500	Tsogoo, hang4u, maaRaa, ncl, temk4wow	

== South America ==
The second new division, the LA LEAGUE, will have eight teams all from South America. The top four teams will move on to a bracket stage and the bottom four teams will be eliminated from the season. The top two teams will head to São Paulo, Brazil for a LAN final to determine which team would head to Dallas for the EPLS7 Finals.

=== Broadcast talent ===
Commentators

- Bernardo "BiDa" Moura
- Pablo "xrm" Oliveira

Analysts

- Otávio "bczz" Boccuzzi
- Luis Felipe "savage" Hessel

=== Standings ===
The LA LEAGUE final standings are shown below. Each team's in-game leaders are shown first. Rosters reflect what they look like by the end of the regular season. For instance, Furious Gaming was forced to replace meyern in favor of Roberto "Reversive" Themtham due to EPL's having a rule that all players need to be at least sixteen years of age in order to compete, so Reversive's name is shown with Furious.

Unlike North America and Europe overtime rules, LA LEAGUE has no overtime and the game ends at 30 rounds. The team that gets to sixteen rounds first earns three points and the loser gets zero. If the two teams are tied at 15 by the end of the game, each team earns one point.

Midway through the season, YeaH! Gaming and Virtue Gaming, which had just picked up the Dereguedere roster, withdrew from the LA League as the teams had visa issues for their players.

Final Standings
Place	Prize Money	Team	W–T–L	RD	Pts	Roster	Coach
1st	TBD	Furia eSports	9–0–1	+85	27	arT, ksc, spacca, VINI, yuurih	guerri
2nd	TBD	Isurus Gaming	8–0–2	+26	24	Noktse, 1962, nbl, NikoM, Straka	
3rd	TBD	Sharks Esports	7–0–3	+42	21	nak, exit, jnt, leo_drunky, RCF	coachi
4th	TBD	W7M Gaming	3–0–7	−18	9	raafa, luk, pancc, ryotzz, YJ	rzO
5th	R$5,000	Team Wild	2–0–8	−62	6	landic, betoow, DANVIET, GYZER, rAncrow	
6th	R$5,000	Furious Gaming	1–0–9	−73	3	andrew, DILLION1, maxujas, pAbLusA, Reversive	LokomotioN
DQ	N/A	~~Dereguedere~~	~~5–1–2~~	~~+30~~	~~16~~	~~land1n, dzt, fP1, shz, tatazin~~	
DQ	N/A	~~YeaH! Gaming~~	~~5–0–3~~	~~+3~~	~~15~~	~~zqk, bld V, delboNi, duken, xand~~	~~rkz~~

LA Results

Results
	Dereg	Furia	Furious	Isurus	Sharks	W7M	Wild	YeaH!
Dereg			16–10; 16–1		16–13; 14–16	15–15; 16–9		16–13; 14–16
Furia			16–3; 16–7	13–16; 16–9	16–6; 16–1	16–11; 16–0	16–9; 16–10	
Furious	10–16; 1–16	3–16; 7–16		8–16; 8–16	8–16; 3–16	4–16; 11–16	8–16; 16–5	
Isurus		16–13; 9–16	16–8; 16–8		3–16; 16–10	16–8; 16–14	16–7; 16–14	16–3; 16–12
Sharks	13–16; 16–14	6–16; 1–16	16–8; 16–3	16–3; 10–16		16–4; 16–3	16–12; 16–6	
Wild		11–16; 0–16	16–4; 16–11	8–16; 14–16	4–16; 3–16		6–16; 3–16	9–16; 11–16
W7M	15–15; 9–16	9–16; 10–16	16–8; 5–16	7–16; 14–16	6–16; 12–16	16–6; 16–3		11–16; 6–16
YeaH!	13–16; 16–14			3–16; 12–16		16–9; 16–11	16–11; 16–6	

=== Bracket ===
Semifinals
1	Furia eSports	2
4	W7M Gaming	0
2	Isurus Gaming	0
3	Sharks Esports	2

Dallas Qualifier
1	Furia eSports	1
3	Sharks Esports	3

Place	Team	Prize Money
1st	Sharks Esports	TBD
2nd	Furia eSports	R$20,000
3rd–4th	Isurus Gaming	R$8,000
3rd–4th	W7M Gaming	R$8,000

== Finals ==
The finalized teams are shown below. Each team's HLTV.org's ranking prior to the event is also shown next to the team.

North America

- Team Liquid (9)
- NRG Esports (18)
- OpTic Gaming (42)
- Cloud9 (6)
- Renegades (12)
- SK Gaming (8)

Europe

- mousesports (3)
- Ninjas in Pyjamas (7)
- Natus Vincere (4)
- FaZe Clan (2)
- Space Soldiers (17)
- Astralis (1)
- HellRaisers (16)

Asia-Pacific

- MVP PK (25)
- Grayhound Gaming (23)

South America

- Sharks Esports (74)

=== Broadcast talent ===
Desk host

- Alex "Machine" Richardson

Stage host

- Alex "Goldenboy" Mendez

Interviewer

- Tres "stunna" Saranthus

Commentators

- Alex "Snodz" Byfield
- Hugo Byron
- Henry "HenryG" Greer
- Jordan "Elfishguy" Mays
- Harry "JustHarry" Russell
- Jason "moses" O'Toole
- Jack "Jacky" Peters

Analysts

- Chad "SPUNJ" Burchill
- Janko "YNk" Paunović
- Jacob "Pimp" Winneche

Observers

- Heather "sapphiRe" Garozzo
- Alex "Rushly" Rush

=== Group stage ===
The format of the group stage will be two groups of eight teams in a double elimination bracket. The teams to win their brackets will move on to the semifinals while the next two teams will be in the quarterfinals.

==== Group A ====
mousesports was the top feature in Group A after winning the Europe division and the team was in its strongest form ever in team history, winning StarLadder & i-League StarSeries Season 4 and upsetting FaZe Clan in the V4 Future Sports Festival in another tournament win. In addition, it came in a solid third-place finish at the Intel Extreme Masters Season XIII – Sydney. NRG Esports was also in its strongest form as it topped the Esports Championship Series Season 5 North America division; however, NRG finished in a very disappointing 9th place at IEM Sydney in its only premier LAN tournament. Natus Vincere quickly turned things around led by Oleksandr "s1mple" Kostyliev dominating performances, leading to two runner-up finishes at StarLadder Season 4 and at DreamHack Masters Marseille 2018 after Na'Vi had struggled for the most part of 2017. FaZe Clan was also in the group as after falling short at five straight tournaments, the team finally won IEM Sydney in a sweep, but close series, against Astralis. The defending major champions Cloud9 had a disappointing path after the major after the departure of Jake "Stewie2K" Yip, finishing 9th at StarLadder Season 4 and fifth at three straight LANs, two of which ended up being upsets against the team. HellRaisers managed to sneak into another finals and looked to replicate its playoff run from last season. HellRaisers won the Bets.net Masters: Season 1 over North and a solid third place at the V4 festival, but had no other results to show for. MVP PK was quickly improving in the Asian region under the leadership of legendary 1.6 player Kang "solo" Keun-chul. The Koreans placed 9th at IEM Sydney 2018, but was eliminated by mousesports and had a close map against the Europeans. Its most impressive run was at World Electronic Sports Games 2017, where it split two maps with Team Russia and went to the playoffs over Team EnVyUs and had an extremely close first map against Fnatic in the quarterfinals. Sharks Esports was the weakest team in the finals, but the team managed to pull off two major upsets in the LA League over Isurus Gaming and Furia eSports. mousesports, FaZe Clan, and Natus Vincere were the favorites to move on to the playoffs.

===== Winner's bracket =====
Winner's Quarterfinals
EU1	mousesports	1
SA1	Sharks Esports	0
EU4	FaZe Clan	1
NA4	Cloud9	0
NA2	NRG Esports	0
EU8	Heroic	1
EU3	Natus Vincere	1
AP1	MVP PK	0

Winner's Semifinals
EU1	mousesports	0
EU4	FaZe Clan	2
EU8	Heroic	1
EU3	Natus Vincere	2

Winner's Finals
EU4	FaZe Clan	0
EU3	Natus Vincere	2

===== Loser's bracket =====
Loser's Eighths
SA1	Sharks Esports	1
NA4	Cloud9	2
NA2	NRG Esports	2
AP1	MVP PK	1

Loser's Quarterfinals
EU8	Heroic	2
NA4	Cloud9	0
EU1	mousesports	2
NA2	NRG Esports	0

Playoff Qualifier
EU8	Heroic	0
EU1	mousesports	2

mousesports faced off against Sharks eSports to kick off the season 7 finals. While mousesports was heavily favored in this matchup, it was Sharks to come out on top in the first half with a one-round lead. However, mousesports's terrorist was too much to handle for Sharks and mousesports ran away with it. The anticipated FaZe Clan vs. Cloud9 Major grand final rematch proved to be a downer as FaZe completely dominated the now FNS-lead Cloud9. The last minute replacement Heroic with a lineup that was just recently assembled ran over the red-hot NRG Esports, limiting NRG to just three rounds. Natus Vincere had a close half with MVP PK, but the Ukrainians took down MVP PK's defense in the second half to cruise to a win. FaZe Clan was the first team to guarantee a spot in the playoffs after barely holding off a comeback attempt by mousesports in the first map and then dominating in the second map. Sharks eSports put up a surprise win against Cloud9 in the first map in double overtime, but Cloud9 held off a comeback attempt in the second map and then pulled away the Brazilians' confidence in the third map to survive an initial scare to send Sharks home. Heroic started its best-of-three well by taking map one, with its terrorist side denying Natus Vincere of much success. However, Na'Vi responded on the second map in the second half as its counter-terrorist side shut down the offense of Heroic. In the third map, Na'Vi had a dominant first half, but Heroic an equally dominant half to send the game to overtime. Na'Vi regrouped and was able to clutch out the overtime, denying the comeback and was awarded a playoff spot. MVP PK pulled off a first map upset win over NRG Esports, but NRG bounced by taking the second map as it shut down the Korean side in both fronts. NRG had a much more dominant showing by completely shutting down MVP PK's terrorist side in the first half and finished the team off later on. Heroic moved one step closer to the playoffs by pulling off an upset over Cloud9. mousesports won a close series over NRG Esports to face off against Heroic to decide which team moved on to the playoffs. All four European teams in the group were in the final four of the group. Natus Vincere pulled off an upset series win versus FaZe Clan in the winner's final to clinch a bye in the playoffs while FaZe takes second seed. mousesports was able to defuse the hot streak of Heroic in two maps to take the last spot in the playoffs for group A.

Group A Results

Group A matches
Team	Score	Map	Score	Team
mousesports	16	Inferno	10	Sharks Esports
FaZe Clan	16	Cache	3	Cloud9
NRG Esports	6	Mirage	16	Heroic
Natus Vincere	16	Mirage	7	MVP PK
mousesports	14	Overpass	16	FaZe Clan
mousesports	4	Mirage	16	FaZe Clan
mousesports	–	Train	–	FaZe Clan
Heroic	16	Cache	11	Natus Vincere
Heroic	13	Overpass	16	Natus Vincere
Heroic	16	Mirage	19	Natus Vincere
Sharks eSports	22	Cache	20	Cloud9
Sharks eSports	11	Mirage	16	Cloud9
Sharks Esports	1	Inferno	16	Cloud9
NRG Esports	10	Cache	16	MVP PK
NRG Esports	16	Train	8	MVP PK
NRG Esports	16	Mirage	2	MVP PK
Heroic	16	Mirage	11	Cloud9
Heroic	16	Overpass	7	Cloud9
Heroic	–	Train	–	Cloud9
mousesports	16	Cache	14	NRG Esports
mousesports	16	Nuke	10	NRG Esports
mousesports	–	Inferno	–	NRG Esports
FaZe Clan	12	Mirage	16	Natus Vincere
FaZe Clan	12	Nuke	16	Natus Vincere
FaZe Clan	–	Train	–	Natus Vincere
Heroic	9	Cache	16	mousesports
Heroic	14	Mirage	16	mousesports
Heroic	–	Dust II	–	mousesports

==== Group B ====
Team Liquid headlined group B by topping the North American division and after a successful run of tournaments, the sudden departure of Lucas "steel" Lopes due to personal issues had the team acquire Epitactio "TACO" de Melo, who had just left SK Gaming. After acquiring TACO, the team failed to qualify for IEM Sydney 2018 and finished in a rough 9th place at Intel Extreme Masters Season XII – World Championship Astralis was also in the group as the current world number one won DreamHack Masters Marseille 2018 and was the runner-up at IEM Sydney. Ninjas in Pyjamas was in the group after finishing second in Europe, but its recent tournaments only showed mediocre results, losing to the inconsistent Heroic, Team Liquid, Fnatic, and the struggling Virtus.pro in a qualifier to IEM Sydney. Renegades exceeded many expectations in 2018 after making the playoffs at StarLadder Season 4 and nearly knocking off mousesports in front of its home crowd at IEM Sydney. Space Soldiers surprised Europe after being in first place for a long time and ended up in fourth to qualify for the playoffs. However, other than a WESG 2017 runner-up performance, Space Soldiers didn't have any other results to prove that it could compete with the best. OpTic Gaming was the biggest question mark coming into the tournament as Shahzeeb "ShahZaM" Khan and Peter "stanislaw" Jarguz left the team and OpTic made the team fully Danish. In 2018, OpTic had zero LAN results as it fell at every online qualifier. SK Gaming was once the most dominating force, but 2018 was a massive struggle for it and appeared even worse after TACO left the team and Stewie2K joined. After a strong major performance at third place, the team suffered upset after upset, losing to Team Liquid twice, Cloud9 at IEM Worlds, losing to BIG and Team Russia to finish in 17th at WESG 2017, struggled against mousesports at DreamHack Masters Marseille 2018, and was upset by TyLoo and Grayhound Gaming at IEM Sydney, which was the tournament the Brazilians had won the year before. SK looked to defend its EPL title after barely sneaking into the season 7 finals. Grayhound rounded up the list. The team finished in second at the CS:GO Asia Summit to MVP PK and upset SK Gaming at IEM Sydney and fell to the eventual champions FaZe Clan. Aside from Astralis, there was no clear favorite to go through to the playoffs.

===== Winner's bracket =====
Winner's Quarterfinals
NA1	Team Liquid	1
AP2	Grayhound Gaming	0
EU5	Space Soldiers	1
NA5	Renegades	0
NA3	OpTic Gaming	0
EU6	Astralis	1
EU2	Ninjas in Pyjamas	0
NA6	SK Gaming	1

Winner's Semifinals
NA1	Team Liquid	2
EU5	Space Soldiers	0
EU6	Astralis	2
NA6	SK Gaming	0

Winner's Finals
NA1	Team Liquid	0
EU6	Astralis	2

===== Loser's bracket =====
Loser's Eighths
AP2	Grayhound Gaming	0
NA5	Renegades	2
NA3	OpTic Gaming	2
EU2	Ninjas in Pyjamas	0

Loser's Quarterfinals
NA6	SK Gaming	2
NA5	Renegades	0
EU5	Space Soldiers	0
NA3	OpTic Gaming	2

Playoff Qualifier
NA6	SK Gaming	2
NA3	OpTic Gaming	1

Team Liquid started off group B with a strong win over Grayhound Gaming as Jonathan "EliGE" Jablonowski showed why many considered Liquid to be the best North American team. Space Soldiers took down a rising Renegades despite having a stand-in in dominating fashion to move on to face Liquid in the upper bracket semifinals. OpTic Gaming tried out its new roster against the world's best, but Emil "Magisk" Reif performed well against his old team and Astralis easily took down OpTic. The struggling SK Gaming went up against the Ninjas in Pyjamas, but crucial mistakes from both teams had the game going to overtime. There, the Brazilians showed signs of revival as SK finally downed the Swedes. Team Liquid was the first team in group B to move on by having a relatively easy win over Space Soldiers. Astralis pulled off a dominant performance despite two comeback attempts from SK Gaming to pull in a spot in the playoffs. In the loser's side, Renegades defeated its compatriot Grayhound Gaming in two close maps to stay alive. OpTic Gaming took advantage of Ninjas in Pyjamas's struggles to move on to face Space Soldiers. SK Gaming was able to stay alive in the finals by eliminating Renegades in a quick 2–0. OpTic Gaming made even quicker work over Space Soldiers in its 2–0 dominating victory. Astralis proved it was the best in the world by easily taking down North America's best in Team Liquid to go straight to the semifinals. SK Gaming won perhaps the most thrilling series of the group stage over OpTic as the Brazilian core finally won a playoffs spot since the addition of Stewie2K.

Group B Results

Group B matches
Team	Score	Map	Score	Team
Team Liquid	16	Cache	5	Grayhound Gaming
Space Soldiers	16	Inferno	7	Renegades
OpTic Gaming	3	Nuke	16	Astralis
Ninjas in Pyjamas	16	Inferno	19	SK Gaming
Team Liquid	16	Mirage	11	Space Soldiers
Team Liquid	16	Inferno	7	Space Soldiers
Team Liquid	–	Dust II	–	Space Soldiers
Astralis	16	Inferno	11	SK Gaming
Astralis	16	Overpass	10	SK Gaming
Astralis	–	Train	–	SK Gaming
Grayhound Gaming	13	Overpass	16	Renegades
Grayhound Gaming	10	Cache	16	Renegades
Grayhound Gaming	–	Mirage	–	Renegades
OpTic Gaming	16	Mirage	7	Ninjas in Pyjamas
OpTic Gaming	16	Inferno	14	Ninjas in Pyjamas
OpTic Gaming	–	Overpass	–	Ninjas in Pyjamas
SK Gaming	16	Cache	7	Renegades
SK Gaming	16	Mirage	11	Renegades
SK Gaming	–	Inferno	–	Renegades
Space Soldiers	4	Inferno	16	OpTic Gaming
Space Soldiers	5	Nuke	16	OpTic Gaming
Space Soldiers	–	Mirage	–	OpTic Gaming
Team Liquid	10	Nuke	16	Astralis
Team Liquid	7	Inferno	16	Astralis
Team Liquid	–	Dust II	–	Astralis
SK Gaming	14	Train	16	OpTic Gaming
SK Gaming	16	Dust II	6	OpTic Gaming
SK Gaming	16	Inferno	13	OpTic Gaming

=== Playoffs ===
The two runner-ups from each group will each face off in the quarterfinals. The top seeds in each group will earn automatic berths to the playoffs. The quarterfinals and semifinals will be best of three matches and the finals will be a best of five.

Quarterfinals
B2	Team Liquid	2
A3	mousesports	0
A2	FaZe Clan	2
B3	SK Gaming	0

Semifinals
A1	Natus Vincere	0
B2	Team Liquid	2
B1	Astralis	2
A2	FaZe Clan	0

Grand Finals
B2	Team Liquid	1
B1	Astralis	3

==== Quarterfinals ====
Team Liquid had a relatively easy time in the group stage until Astralis's Nicolai "dev1ce" Reedtz put up a masterclass performance to completely shut down Liquid. The number one overall seeded mousesports had a tough time in the group stage after winning a closer than expected game against Sharks, being thrashed by FaZe Clan, and pulling off two wins in the loser's bracket that might have gone either way. Historically, mousesports's roster has a slight 7–5 map record over Liquid. In the other quarterfinals matchup, the FaZe Clan-SK Gaming rivalry continued. FaZe's captain Finn "karrigan" Andersen had never won a series against SK's captain Gabriel "FalleN" Toledo, but with SK only testing new waters and having communication issues as it brought in the American Jake "Stewie2K" Yip, this was karrigan's chance to finally get a series win over FalleN. FalleN had a 9–0 series lead over karrigan and a 10–0 record on Overpass against the Danish in-game leader.

The first game of the playoffs started off on Mirage, mousesports's pick and best map and the map proved to be a thriller. mousesports looked to take the map late in the game, but and resurgence from Liquid allowed the Americans to get map point first. However, mousesports was able to tie it after thirty rounds to send the game to overtime. Liquid started the overtime strong by taking two of three rounds in the first overtime half and then got to match point, but the resilience of the Europeans pushed the game to a second overtime. The first five rounds went exactly as the first overtime and the game looked to go to a triple overtime. However, Liquid was able to pull through to steal the map away. Dust II was the next map, a map that mousesports was famed for when Nikola "NiKo" Kovač was on the team before transferring to FaZe. However, Liquid rode the wave of momentum and had a dominant first half. Liquid went up 14–4 after winning the pistol round and the two follow-up rounds. Liquid was able to clean up the overall number one seeded team and moved on to the semifinals against Natus Vincere.

FaZe Clan started extremely strong on Overpass against SK Gaming with a 7–0 lead, which included a 1 vs. 4 clutch from karrigan, but SK was able to bring the score within two before FaZe took the last three rounds. FaZe later went up to 13–5, which looked to be the end of SK. However, SK paced itself back into the match and the score later reached a 15–13 scoreline. However, a desert eagle shot from NiKo to take out Stewie2K gave FaZe enough room to take over the A bombsite and eventually Håvard "rain" Nygaard won the duel against Marcelo "coldzera" David in the battle of two top five players as karrigan finally defeated FalleN on Overpass for the first time in his career. FaZe would later expose SK's flaws as it dominated the first half. FaZe booked a ticket to a match with Astralis as karrigan finally had his first series win against FalleN, albeit not with FalleN in-game leading as coldzera had recently taken over the role and the defending champions were knocked out.

Quarterfinals scores
Team	Score	Map	Score	Team
Team Liquid	22	Mirage	20	mousesports
Team Liquid	16	Dust II	4	mousesports
Team Liquid	–	Inferno	–	mousesports
FaZe Clan	16	Overpass	13	SK Gaming
FaZe Clan	16	Mirage	5	SK Gaming
FaZe Clan	–	Cache	–	SK Gaming

==== Semifinals ====
Fresh off of its win over mousesports, Liquid looked to move on to another grand finals. On the other hand, Natus Vincere was in its best form ever since picking up Oleksandr "s1mple" Kostyliev from Team Liquid. s1mple's current team was the favored team in the matchup against his former team. Meanwhile, a rematch of IEM Sydney 2018 took place in the second semifinals, in which FaZe won one of the closest 3–0 over Astralis. FaZe was coming off of its high by beating SK Gaming for the first time ever.

Na'Vi jumped out to a massive 8–3 lead before Liquid started to recover by winning three of the last four rounds to keep the score relatively close. Na'Vi later made it 12–6, but Liquid took over from there. Led by newly acquired Epitácio "TACO" de Melo's entry fragging, the American team took nine of the next ten rounds to reach map point first. Na'Vi won the twenty-ninth round to potentially send the game to overtime, but Liquid denied it and took the first map in regulation. Liquid continued its hot streak by going up 8–0 on Inferno, the second map, before Na'Vi struggled to pull away four rounds in the first half. Na'Vi did better the second half, but could not recover from the damage Liquid inflicted in the first and Liquid moved on to another grand finals.

The second semifinals was supposed to be a potential grand finals matchup, but the series proved to be underwhelming. On the first map, Astralis had a slight 3–2 edge. However, the Danes never looked back after that and jumped to a 12–3 halftime lead. The second half was a simple cleanup of the job they had to easily take the first map. The second map was even more one-sided as Astralis took a 9–0 lead and finished the half with a 13–2 lead. FaZe took four rounds in the second half, but the game was too far out of reach and Astralis moved on to another final.

Semifinals scores
Team	Score	Map	Score	Team
Natus Vincere	14	Dust II	16	Team Liquid
Natus Vincere	10	Inferno	16	Team Liquid
Natus Vincere	–	Mirage	–	Team Liquid
Astralis	16	Mirage	3	FaZe Clan
Astralis	16	Inferno	6	FaZe Clan
Astralis	–	Overpass	–	FaZe Clan

==== Grand finals ====
Both teams looked to win their first EPL title. Liquid's best performance was at the Season 5 Finals, where it placed third, and Astralis's best placement was at the Season 2 Finals, where it placed third when it was playing under the ? banner. With Astralis breezing past the second best team in the world, the Danes were heavily favored to win the series, but Liquid was playing in front of its home crowd.

Astralis came out the door swinging and easily took the first game, allowing just one round to Liquid and made the Americans look worse than FaZe. However, in the second map, Liquid made it close after the first half, taking six rounds. Liquid looked to solve the Astralis puzzle as it was within a couple rounds to win the second game, but Astralis turned its gears on to just about come back on Nuke to take a stranglehold on the series, but Liquid did prove that it could hang with the best. Mirage proved to be another thriller as it went to another thirtieth round and Liquid was down 13–7. Astralis had a 4 vs. 3 advantage and wanted to plant the bomb, but Keith "NAF" Markovic pushed at just the right time and four Astralis members went down and Liquid was the first team at the event to take a map off of Astralis. Liquid looked to be getting stronger as the series went on as the North American team reached ten rounds in the first half on the fourth map. Liquid looked to pull away, but Astralis started a comeback in the second half, where the top Danish team was known for its counter-terrorist side and tied it at 11. Astralis would pull away by shutting down the offense of Liquid to take home its first EPL title.

Finals scores
Team	Score	Map	Score	Team
Team Liquid	1	Dust II	16	Astralis
Team Liquid	14	Nuke	16	Astralis
Team Liquid	16	Mirage	14	Astralis
Team Liquid	12	Inferno	16	Astralis
Team Liquid	–	Cache	–	Astralis

=== Finals standings ===
Between the end of the online season and the start of the finals, several changes took place.

HellRaisers pulled out of the Dallas finals due to Özgür "woxic" Eker's visa problems, so Heroic was next in line to replace the team. In addition, Marco "Snappi" Pfeiffer and Jakob "JUGi" Hansen were transferred to OpTic Gaming as Peter "stanislaw" Jarguz, Shahzeb "ShahZaM" Khan, and coach Chet "ImAPet" Singh officially left the team after the regular season. OpTic also signed former North coach Casper "ruggah" Due to replace ImAPet. To fill in the voids, Heroic brought Patrick "es3tag" Hansen back to the active roster and signed Adam "friberg" Friberg as a temporary replacement. Ruben "RUBINO" Villarroel could not attend the event for Heroic as well, so Jørgen "cromen" Robertsen was brought in as a substitute. Another Turk had visa issues, as Buğra "Calyx" Arkın's visa was denied, so Space Soldiers used Çağatay "DESPE" Sedef, who was on the roster as Space Soldiers was the only top team which had six players on its active roster.

Place	Team	Prize Money
1st	Astralis	US$250,000
2nd	Team Liquid	US$110,000
3rd – 4th	FaZe Clan	US$55,000
3rd – 4th	Natus Vincere	US$55,000
5th–6th	mousesports	US$32,000
5th–6th	SK Gaming	US$32,000
7th–8th	Heroic	US$24,000
7th–8th	OpTic Gaming	US$24,000
9th–12th	Cloud9	US$22,000
9th–12th	NRG Esports	US$22,000
9th–12th	Renegades	US$22,000
9th–12th	Space Soldiers	US$22,000
13th–16th	Grayhound Gaming	US$20,000
13th–16th	MVP PK	US$20,000
13th–16th	Ninjas in Pyjamas	US$20,000
13th–16th	Sharks eSports	US$20,000
