= ESL Pro League Season 6 =

ESL Pro League
- 2017

Tournament information
- Sport: Counter-Strike: Global Offensive
- Location: Odense, Denmark
- Dates: August 22, 2017–December 10, 2017
- Administrator: Electronic Sports League (ESL)
- Venue: Sparekassen Fyn Arena
- Teams: 28 teams
- Purse: US$1,000,000

Final positions
- Champions: SK Gaming
- 1st runners-up: FaZe Clan
- 2nd runners-up: Fnatic; Misfits
- MVP: Epitácio "TACO" de Melo

ESL Pro League Season 6 (shortened as EPL Season 6) is a Counter-Strike: Global Offensive tournament run by ESL. It is the sixth season of the ESL Pro League. The finals moved back to Europe after two seasons and will be hosted for the first time in Denmark. Teams from two continents, North America and Europe will compete in fourteen team leagues to attempt to qualify for the Finals. The regular season for Europe began with Heroic defeating HellRaisers and ended with mousesports defeating Astralis. North America's season began with OpTic Gaming winning against Ghost Gaming and ended with Luminosity Gaming defeating Rogue to clinch the final spot in the finals as the last match Season 6.

The season officially ended with SK Gaming defeating FaZe Clan 3–1 in the best of five grand finals. This EPL title was the second for the SK Gaming roster, with its first with Luminosity Gaming at EPL Season 3.

This tournament was part of the Intel Grand Slam, which is a list of premier tournaments run by ESL and DreamHack. The first team to win four titles would earn an extra $1,000,000. This was SK Gaming's second title, with its first being ESL One Cologne 2017. FaZe Clan (ESL One New York 2017), G2 Esports (DreamHack Masters Malmö 2017), and Ninjas in Pyjamas (IEM Oakland 2017) each had one Grand Slam title coming into the tournament.

== Format ==
The format is mostly the same as EPL Season 5.

Each continent will feature the top 11 teams from last season's ESL Pro League Season 5, one team from the ESEA Season 24: Premier Finals and two teams from the Season 5 Relegation, which featured the bottom two teams from each league from Season 5 and the two runners-up from the ESEA Season 24: Premier Finals.

During the regular season, each team will play every team in its league in two best-of-ones. The winner of each game will receive three points and the loser of each game will receive zero points. However, a new point system was introduced this season. If a game ends to overtime, the winner will receive two points and the loser will receive one point. The top six teams by the end of the season from each region will head to the Finals in Denmark. Teams that placed seventh through eleventh will not head to the playoffs but will secure a spot in next season's EPL. Teams that placed twelve and thirteenth will go through a relegation phase, in which those teams will be placed in a four team double elimination bracket, along with teams that placed second and third in the ESEA Season 26: Premier Division of their region. The top two teams move on to EPL Season 7. The winner of ESEA Season 26: Premier Division will automatically be invited to EPL Season 7. The team that came in fourteenth place will automatically be demoted to ESEA Season 26: Premier Division.

The Finals will consist of twelve teams, six from Europe and six from North America. These teams will be separated into two groups. The group stage will consist of every team in each group playing against each other. Unlike last season, the group stage format will differ in that teams will get to choose their opponents. The first seeds of Europe and North American will choose one team they want to avoid. For instance, if Fnatic – the first seed of Europe – wants to avoid SK Gaming in the group stage, SK Gaming will be placed in the opposite group. Then OpTic Gaming, the first seed for North America, will choose one opponent it wants to avoid, which would be, for instance, FaZe Clan and FaZe would be placed in the opposite group. After those two teams choose, SK would be next in line to choose an opponent to avoid then FaZe would do the same and the process would go on until all teams are chosen. The top three teams in each group will play move on to the Playoffs. If three teams are tied for one or two playoffs spot, then the teams will play on Train in an overtime-style best of one tiebreaker. Two teams will be randomly chosen to play in the first match. The winner of that match will play the third team. The winner of the second match will receive a spot in the playoffs. The remaining teams will play in a final third match and the winner of that match will move on to the playoffs. Another change in the group stage is if a game heads to overtime, the winner of the game would get two points and the loser would get one point; if a game ends in regulation, the winner gets three points and the loser gets zero points. In the playoffs, the Round of Six and the semifinals will be a best of three and the finals will be a best of five. The winner of the finals will win the tournament and the top prize. All games in the Finals will be played offline. The top team in each group will receive a bye and automatically move onto the Semifinals. The other four teams will play in the Round of Six. The winners of those two games will move on to the Semifinals, and the winner of the Semifinals will move onto the Finals. The winner of the grand finals is crowned as champion of ESL Pro League Season 6.

== Teams ==
North America

- SK Gaming (Season 5 #1)
- Team Liquid (Season 5 #2)
- Immortals (Season 5 #3)
- NRG Esports (Season 5 #4)
- Cloud9 (Season 5 #5)
- OpTic Gaming (Season 5 #6)
- Luminosity Gaming (Season 5 #7)
- Counter Logic Gaming (Season 5 #8)
- Renegades (Season 5 #9)
- Misfits (Season 5 #10)
- compLexity Gaming (Season 5 #11)
- Splyce (ESEA Premier Season 24)
- Ghost Gaming (Season 5 Relegation)
- Rogue (Season 5 Relegation)

Europe

- North (Season 5 #1)
- G2 Esports (Season 5 #2)
- mousesports (Season 5 #3)
- Fnatic (Season 5 #4)
- Natus Vincere (Season 5 #5)
- Team EnVyUs (Season 5 #6)
- FaZe Clan (Season 5 #7)
- Astralis (Season 5 #8)
- Heroic (Season 5 #9)
- Ninjas in Pyjamas (Season 5 #10)
- Team LDLC.com (Season 5 #11)
- GODSENT (ESEA Premier Season 24)
- HellRaisers (Season 5 Relegation)
- BIG (Season 5 Relegation)

=== Season 5 Relegation ===
Before each season, three spots need to be filled up in each league. The team that came in last place in each league is automatically relegated to the premier division for the following season, season 25. Meanwhile, the winner of the premier division's season 24 is automatically promoted to the professional division. For the last two spots, the two runners-up of season 24 of the premier division will be placed in a four team, best of three, double elimination bracket against the teams that placed twelfth and thirteenth in EPL Season 5. The final two teams are promoted to EPL Season 6 and the other two teams are demoted to ESEA Premier Division Season 25.

==== North America ====
Season 5 Relegation

- Rush (Season 5 #12)
- The Foundation (Season 5 #13)
- Enigma6 Group (ESEA Season 24 #2)
- Ghost Gaming (ESEA Season 24 #3)

Upper round 1
Rush | 2
Ghost Gaming | 1
The Foundation | 0
Enigma6 Group | 2
Lower round 1
Ghost Gaming | W
The Foundation | FF

Upper final
Rush | 0
Enigma6 Group | 2
Lower final
Rush | 0
Ghost Gaming | 2

Qualified
Enigma6 Group
Ghost Gaming

==== Europe ====
Season 5 Relegation

- HellRaisers (Season 5 #12)
- Virtus.pro (Season 5 #13)
- BIG (ESEA Season 24 #2)
- PENTA Sports (ESEA Season 24 #3)

Upper round 1
HellRaisers | 2
PENTA Sports | 0
Virtus.pro | 0
BIG | 2
Lower round 1
PENTA Sports | 2
Virtus.pro | 0

Upper final
HellRaisers | 2
BIG | 1
Lower final
BIG | 2
PENTA Sports | 0

Qualified
HellRaisers
BIG

== North America ==
=== Broadcast Talent ===
Host

- Tres "Stunna" Saranthus

Commentators

- Conner "Scrawny" Girvan
- Mohan "Launders" Govindasamy
- Danny "dK" Kim
- Jordan "Elfishguy" Mays
- John "BLU" Mullen
- Jason "moses" O'Toole
- Mitch "Pili" Pilipowski
- Kevin "KaRath" Zhu

Analysts

- James "JamezIRL" Macaulay
- Erik "da_bears" Stromberg

Observers

- Efren "encg" Chuong
- Heather "sapphiRe" Garozzo
- Codey Ho
- Carey "frozt" Kertenian
- DJ "Prius" Kuntz
- Alex "caLe" Maxwell

=== Standings ===
The North American final standings are shown below. Each team's in-game leader is shown first.

SK Gaming was the first team to clinch a spot after defeating Rogue twice. The semifinalist from last season and two time major champions looked to win its first premier tournament since ESL One: Cologne 2017 in July. OpTic Gaming also clinched a spot after NRG Esports lost a game to Misfits as the newly formed European team proved that it could go head to head with North America's best. Team Liquid snagged a spot going 1–1 against Renegades and Splyce going 2–0 against Counter Logic Gaming. Misfits clinched a spot after defeating Cloud9. NRG, like past season, did well in the regular season as it took the fifth spot after going 2–0 against Immortals. Luminosity Gaming took the last spot away from Counter Logic Gaming as it went 2–0 against Rogue in the very last game of the season, finally giving Luminosity's new roster a premier international experience. SK forfeited its last two matches against OpTic to give the European team first seed in North America.

The Immortals shakeup hit the team hard as what was formerly Brazil's second best team was in the relegation phase. Ghost performed poorly throughout the season and Rogue showed some promise, but was also relegated. compLexity once again managed to secure a spot for the next season. The EPL Season 4 champions. Cloud9, finished in eighth place.

Final Standings
| Place | Prize Money | Team | W-L | RF-RA | RD | Pts | Roster | Coach |
|---|---|---|---|---|---|---|---|---|
| 1st | TBD | OpTic Gaming | 20-6 | 340-265 | +75 | 60 | friberg, allu, HS, Magisk, mixwell | ImaPet |
| 2nd | TBD | SK Gaming | 18-8 | 348-251 | +97 | 55 | FalleN, boltz, coldzera, fer, TACO | |
| 3rd | TBD | Team Liquid | 17-9 | 353-307 | +46 | 48 | nitr0, EliGE, jdm64, stanislaw, Twistzz | zews |
| 4th | TBD | NRG Esports | 16-10 | 356-267 | +89 | 47 | FugLy, Brehze, AnJ, CeRq, daps | |
| 5th | TBD | Misfits | 15-11 | 340-329 | +8 | 47 | sgares, ShahZaM, SicK, amaNEk, devoduvek | |
| 6th | TBD | Luminosity Gaming | 15-11 | 330-305 | +25 | 43 | PKL, chelo, NEKIZ, SHOOWTiME, yeL | Apoka |
| 7th | US$27,000 | Counter Logic Gaming | 14-12 | 343-337 | +6 | 42 | FNS, koosta, nahtE, reltuC, Rickeh | Ryu |
| 8th | US$23,000 | Cloud9 | 14-12 | 347-310 | +37 | 41 | tarik, autimatic, RUSH, Skadoodle, Stewie2K | valens |
| 9th | US$19,000 | Renegades | 12-14 | 347-340 | +7 | 35 | AZR, jks, USTILO, NAF, Nifty | kassad |
| 10th | US$17,500 | Splyce | 11-15 | 287-329 | -42 | 34 | DAVEY, Drone, mitch, roca, Semphis | Eley |
| 11th | US$15,000 | compLexity Gaming | 11-15 | 333-356 | -34 | 33 | Slemmy, ptr, yay, androidx23, dephh | Warden |
| 12th | US$11,500 | Immortals | 9-17 | 272-346 | -74 | 29 | steel, destinyy, horvy, shz, zqk | zakk |
| 13th | US$8,000 | Rogue | 6-20 | 297-395 | -98 | 19 | shinobi, Hiko, wrath, cadiaN, vice | Grt |
| 14th | US$4,000 | Ghost Gaming | 4-22 | 246-404 | -158 | 13 | CoNnOrRr93, Dallas, WARDELL, ryx, seb | bee-1os- |

Between the end of EPL Season 5 and the start of EPL Season 6 and during EPL Season 6, many changes took place.

Perhaps the biggest change from the North America side came from OpTic Gaming. Tarik "tarik" Celik and Will "RUSH" Wierzba transferred to Cloud9 from OpTic Gaming to replace Jordan "n0thing" Gilbert and Michael "shroud" Grzesiek on its active roster. OpTic signed former longtime Ninjas in Pyjamas member Adam "friberg" Friberg, former FaZe Clan AWPer Aleksi "allu" Jalli, and former North star Emil "Magisk" Reif. In addition, OpTic signed Chet "ImAPet" Singh from Counter Logic Gaming (CLG) as a coach. CLG then signs Selfless Gaming founder Steve "Ryu" Rattacasa as its new coach. After weeks of speculation, OpTic also confirmed the transfer of Kevin "HS" Tarn from PENTA Sports, despite PENTA saying it would not let HS go. HS replaced Keith "NAF" Markovic, who was the last member of the original OpTic lineup. After discussion, ESL agreed that OpTic can play in the North American league this season as long it played seventy-five percent of its matches in the continent; however, next season, OpTic would need to move to the Europe league.

Another huge change underwent as Immortals was part of a huge controversy. Vito "kNgV-" Giuseppe's contract was terminated by Immortals following controversy at DreamHack Montreal 2017. In a semifinals game against Counter Logic Gaming, kNgV-, Henrique "HEN1" Teles, and Lucas "LUCAS1" Teles showed up late to their match; after CLG in-game leader Pujan "FNS" Mehta posted on Twitter on how the trio was late, kNgV- publicly threatened FNS. The three were late again in a grand finals match against North, in which Immortals was forced to forfeit the first map. After Immortals CEO gave another chance for kNgV- but did not allow kNgV- to play with the team until further notice, HEN1 and LUCAS1 said they would not play an EPL match without kNgV-; kNgV- played and then was cut from the team. The twins then requested to be benched and Immortals complied. João "horvy" Horvath was later signed to the squad. After Immortals signed the up-and-coming player horvy, acquired Lucas "destinyy" Bullo from Tempo Storm, and picked up the former in-game leader of Keyd Stars (now SK Gaming) Caio "zqk" Fonseca, this guaranteed that Immortals would not get a Legends spot back as Valve rules require teams to keep three of its players in order to keep a seed. It was later confirmed by the players that a new roster had been set up, which included the three former Immortals members, kNgV-, HEN1, and LUCAS1; Lincoln "fnx" Lau, former member of SK Gaming before being traded to Immortals and was then benched by Immortals; and Bruno "BIT" Lima, former teammate of Gabriel "FalleN" Toledo, current captain of SK Gaming. Former Immortals member João "felps" Vasconcellos had a lack of motivation playing with SK Gaming, as FalleN cited that felps was playing in positions he was not used to and missed his family back home in Brazil, so Immortals loaned Ricardo "boltz" Prass for EPICENTER 2017, Intel Extreme Masters Season XII – Oakland, BLAST Pro Series, and the Season 6 Finals, so Immortals acquired Bruno "shz" Martinelli from Tempo Storm for its five-man roster.

Luminosity Gaming released destinyy and Bruno "shz" Martinelli and replaced them with former paiN Gaming members Gabriel "NEKIZ" Schenato and Marcelo "chelo" Cespedes. destinyy and shz go on to join Tempo Storm's newly formed Brazilian roster and then later joined the Immortals.

Rogue pickup the core of the Enigma6 roster and sign former major finalist Spencer "Hiko" Martin to its team. Matthew "WARDELL" Yu joins the team as its AWPer and Shawn "witmer" Taylor stood in for Collin "wrath" McSweegan until the latter reaches the age of 16. Also, Ghost Gaming signs the roster of Bee's Money Crew after releasing the same roster. It also picked up former Echo Fox player Ronnie "ryx" Bylicki and former Keyd Stars captain Caio "zqk" Fonseca. ryx and Arya "arya" Hekmat had been released by Splyce and David "DAVEY" Stafford and Mitch "mitch" Semago replaced the two. Casper "cadiaN" Møller later joined Rogue.

NRG Esports release Derrick "LILMAN" Boyne and sign Allan "AnJ" Jensen. Peter "ptr" Gurney also leaves the team later. NRG then wins the rights to Bulgarian AWPer Cvetelin "CeRq" Dimitrov after Rogue attempted to sign him; however, contract disputes with his former team, Outlaws, may disallow him to compete with NRG. ptr and Jaccob "yay" Whiteaker go on to join compLexity Gaming as Derek "desi" Branchen and Kia "Surreal" Man become free agents. Damian "daps" Steele later steps down from the active roster and moves into the vacant coaching role and NRG trialed Dylan "RIKO" Sabin-Arnce. However, RIKO only lasted a month with the team as results were far from impressive from what the team wanted, so the team finished the trial period with RIKO and daps moved back into the active roster.

Renegades try out David "Jayzwalkingz" Kempner from Fnatic Academy to replace Nemanja "nexa" Isaković. Renegades ends Jayzwalkingz's trial period and replace him with NAF from OpTic.

North America Results

Results
| | SK | Liquid | IMT | NRG | C9 | OpTic | LG | CLG | RNG | MSF | coL | SPY | Ghost | Rogue |
|---|---|---|---|---|---|---|---|---|---|---|---|---|---|---|
| SK | | 12-16; 16-3 | 8-16; 16-12 | 9-16; 16-11 | 16-11; 16-9 | FF-W; FF-W^{1} | 16-4; 16-12 | 3-16; 16-7 | 16-7; 16-13 | 12-16; 16-6 | 16-12; 16-8 | 16-0; 16-19 | 16-13; 16-6 | 16-9; 16-9 |
| Liquid | 16-12; 3-16 | | 14-16; 16-4 | 12-16; 16-5 | 2-16; 16-13 | 6-16; 13-16 | 16-13; 16-10 | 16-11; 16-6 | 4-16; 16-12 | 16-4; 25-22 | 25-22; 13-16 | 16-3; 19-17 | 16-9; 14-16 | 16-8; 16-8 |
| IMT | 16-12; 8-16 | 16-4; 4-16 | | 0-16; 4-16 | 16-5; 3-16 | 16-4; 10-16 | FF-W^{2} 6-16 | 10-16; 6-16 | 19-16; 11-16 | 5-16; 3-16 | 16-9; 9-16 | 16-9; 12-16 | 16-8; 16-6 | 14-16; 17-19 |
| NRG | 16-9; 11-16 | 16-12; 5-16 | 16-0; 16-4 | | 13-16; 16-8 | 3-16; 16-7 | 16-2; 16-5 | 25-23; 14-16 | 16-7; 9-16 | 8-16; 16-6 | 13-16; 19-22 | 19-16; 16-5 | 16-2; 16-4 | 16-6; 9-16 |
| C9 | 11-16; 9-16 | 16-2; 13-16 | 5-16; 16-3 | 16-13; 8-16 | | 9-16; 10-16 | 16-12; 11-16 | 11-16; 12-16 | 16-7; 11-16 | 13-16; 16-11 | 16-14; 16-14 | 16-4; 16-1 | 16-6; 16-12 | 19-15; 16-14 |
| OpTic | W-FF; W-FF^{1} | 16-6; 16-13 | 4-16; 16-10 | 16-3; 7-16 | 16-9; 16-10 | | 16-5; 9-16 | 14-16; 16-1 | 8-16; 16-14 | 10-16; 16-14 | 16-13; 16-14 | 16-12; 16-14 | 16-5; 16-10 | 16-4; 16-12 |
| LG | 4-16; 12-16 | 13-16; 13-16 | W-FF^{2} 16-6 | 2-16; 5-16 | 2-16; 16-11 | 5-16; 16-9 | | 9-16; 25-23 | 16-8; 16-14 | 14-16; 14-16 | 16-13; 16-8 | 16-4; 16-6 | 16-3; 16-6 | 19-15; 16-11 |
| CLG | 16-3; 7-16 | 11-16; 6-16 | 16-10; 16-6 | 23-25; 16-14 | 16-11; 16-12 | 16-14; 1-16 | 16-9; 23-25 | | 19-17; 14-16 | 16-9; 8-16 | 14-16; 10-16 | 14-16; 4-16 | 25-21; 16-4 | 16-13; 16-10 |
| RNG | 7-16; 13-16 | 19-16; 16-19 | 19-16; 11-16 | 7-16; 16-9 | 7-16; 16-11 | 16-8; 14-16 | 8-16; 14-16 | 17-19; 16-14 | | 16-7; 25-22 | 16-10; 16-7 | 4-16; 16-1 | 14-16; 14-16 | 19-16; 16-19 |
| MSF | 16-12; 6-16 | 4-16; 22-25 | 9-16; 9-16 | 16-8; 6-16 | 16-13; 11-16 | 16-10; 14-16 | 16-14; 16-14 | 9-16; 16-8 | 7-16; 22-25 | | 16-7; 4-16 | 16-9; 16-14 | 16-14; 16-8 | 16-8; 16-5 |
| coL | 12-16; 8-16 | 22-25; 16-13 | 9-16; 16-12 | 16-13; 22-19 | 14-16; 14-16 | 13-16; 14-16 | 13-16; 8-16 | 16-14; 16-10 | 10-16; 7-16 | 7-16; 16-4 | | 16-8; 3-16 | 16-11; 10-16 | 16-9; 16-7 |
| SPY | 0-16; 19-16 | 3-16; 17-19 | 16-5; 16-3 | 16-19; 5-16 | 4-16; 1-16 | 12-16; 14-16 | 4-16; 6-16 | 16-14; 16-4 | 16-4; 1-16 | 9-16; 14-16 | 8-16; 16-3 | | 16-9; 16-9 | 16-14; 16-9 |
| Ghost | 13-16; 6-16 | 9-16; 16-14 | 8-16; 6-16 | 2-19; 4-16 | 6-16; 12-16 | 5-16; 10-16 | 3-16; 6-16 | 21-25; 4-16 | 16-14; 16-14 | 14-16; 8-16 | 11-16; 16-10 | 9-16; 9-16 | | 8-16; 14-16 |
| Rogue | 9-16; 9-16 | 8-16; 8-16 | 19-17; 16-14 | 6-16; 16-9 | 15-19; 14-16 | 4-16; 12-16 | 15-19; 11-16 | 13-16; 10-16 | 16-19; 19-16 | 8-16; 5-16 | 9-16; 7-16 | 14-16; 9-16 | 16-8; 16-14 | |

^{1}SK Gaming forfeits both matches against OpTic Gaming as the team was on a flight when the match started.

^{2}Immortals had issues with traveling to DreamHack Montreal 2017, forcing the team to forfeit the first game against Luminosity Gaming.

== Europe ==
=== Broadcast Talent ===
Host

- Oliver James "OJ Borg" Borg D'Anastasi
- Alex "Machine" Richardson

Commentators

- Alex "Snodz" Byfield
- Hugo Byron
- Henry "HenryG" Greer
- Jack "Jacky" Peters
- Harry "JustHarry" Russell
- Lauren "Pansy" Scott
- Matthew "Sadokist" Trivett

Analysts

- Chad "SPUNJ" Burchill
- Joona "natu" Leppänen
- Janko "YNk" Paunović

Observers

- Bastian "UnknownFME" Faber
- Alex "Rushly" Rush

=== Standings ===
The European final standings are shown below. Each team's in-game leaders are shown first.

Fnatic was the first European team to move to the playoffs in Odense after defeating FaZe Clan in two matches. Astralis also clinched a spot after defeating Team EnVyUs in the second game to move on to the playoffs to play in front of its home crowd. With EnVyUs losing, FaZe also clinched a spot despite losing both games to Fnatic. North went on to easily take down Team LDLC.com and BIG to go along with Astralis to its home country. Ninjas in Pyjamas was always floating around in the middle of the pack, but all four matches in week seven helped out the once dominant Swedes to take the fifth spot. HellRaisers would be the surprise team in the top six as it started out the season very poorly, but ended up defeating GODSENT in its last game. Combined with a G2 Esports loss to Fnatic, HellRaisers just about edged its way to the playoffs and G2, the defending EPL champions, settled to seventh place in the season. The Fnatic win also allowed the team to secure the first seed in Europe.

At the bottom of the ladder, BIG ended the season with six straight losses, promptly putting the Germans in last place and demoted to the premier division for next season. LDLC was on the verge of going through the relegation phase, but FaZe defeating Natus Vincere allowed LDLC to stay in eleventh place for the second straight season. Natus Vincere and GODSENT would go on to face the second and third place teams from season 26 of the premier division.

Final Standings
| Place | Prize Money | Team | W-L | RF-RA | RD | Pts | Roster | Coach |
|---|---|---|---|---|---|---|---|---|
| 1st | TBD | Fnatic | 18-8 | 386-303 | +83 | 55 | Golden, flusha, JW, KRiMZ, Lekr0 | Jumpy |
| 2nd | TBD | North | 18-8 | 373-323 | +50 | 53 | MSL, aizy, cajunb, k0nfig, valde | ruggah |
| 3rd | TBD | FaZe Clan | 15-11 | 334-290 | +44 | 47 | karrigan, GuardiaN, NiKo, olofmeister, rain | RobbaN |
| 4th | TBD | Astralis | 16-10 | 355-308 | +47 | 47 | gla1ve, dev1ce, dupreeh, Kjaerbye, Xyp9x | zonic |
| 5th | TBD | Ninjas in Pyjamas | 15-11 | 370-335 | +35 | 42 | Xizt, draken, f0rest, GeT RiGhT, REZ | THREAT |
| 6th | TBD | HellRaisers | 13-13 | 345-334 | +11 | 41 | ANGE1, DeadFox, FejtZ, w0xic, ISSAA | Johnta |
| 7th | US$27,000 | G2 Esports | 13-13 | 368-361 | +7 | 39 | shox, apEX, bodyy, kennyS, NBK- | SmithZz |
| 8th | US$23,000 | Team EnVyUs | 12-14 | 341-370 | -29 | 37 | Happy, RpK, SIXER, xms, ScreaM | maLeK |
| 9th | US$19,000 | mousesports | 12-14 | 349-356 | -7 | 35 | chrisJ, oskar, ropz, STYKO, suNny | lmbt |
| 10th | US$17,500 | Heroic | 11-15 | 341-381 | -40 | 35 | Snappi, es3tag, JUGi, niko, MODDII | peacemaker |
| 11th | US$15,000 | Team LDLC.com | 11-15 | 324-390 | -66 | 32 | Ex6TenZ, ALEX, DEVIL, Maniac, to1nou | Krav |
| 12th | US$11,500 | Natus Vincere | 10-16 | 347-373 | -26 | 30 | Zeus, Edward, s1mple, electronic, flamie | kane |
| 13th | US$8,000 | GODSENT | 9-17 | 310-380 | -70 | 28 | freddieb, dennis, disco doplan, twist, znjader | naSu |
| 14th | US$4,000 | BIG | 9-17 | 319-388 | -69 | 25 | gob b, keev, nex, tabseN, LEGIJA | kakafu |

The biggest change from the European side involved five teams. Denis "seized" Kostin and Ladislav "GuardiaN" Kovács were removed from the Natus Vincere (Na'Vi) lineup. GuardiaN then joins the FaZe Clan lineup, replacing Aleksi "allu" Jalli as its AWPer. allu later joins OpTic Gaming. Danylo "Zeus" Teslenko, one of the founding members of Na'Vi's CS:GO team, returns to Na'Vi despite having just won the PGL Major 2017 with Gambit Esports. Zeus cited that if Gambit cut its coach, Mykhailo "kane" Blagin, then Zeus would leave, too. Gambit did cut kane and Zeus followed him to Na'Vi. seized then returns to the active lineup for Na'Vi to complete its five-man roster. Fnatic and LGB eSports legend Olof "olofmeister" Kajbjer stepped down from Fnatic's roster. The HLTV.org's best player of 2015 went on to join FaZe to replace Fabien "kioShiMa" Fiey. Fnatic trades Dennis "dennis" Edman to GODSENT for Jonas "Lekr0" Olofsson. GODSENT co-founder Markus "pronax" Wallsten is replaced by Jacob "pyth" Mourujärvi for the season. Fredrik "freddieb" Buö is then officially signed by GODSENT as its new in-game leader after transferring over from Epsilon eSports. Maikil "Golden" Selim is the promoted from Fnatic Academy to the main roster as in-game leader and Fnatic fills out its roster. Near the end of the regular season, seized steps down from Na'Vi's active roster and is temporarily replaced by Aleksey "1uke" Zimin; seizes cited the pressure to perform well had taken a toll on him, but his performance was lackluster, even after Zeus had come in to take the big responsibility of in-game leader from seized's shoulders. Later, Na'Vi acquired FlipSid3 Tactics star Denis "electronic" Sharipov and loaned seized to FlipSdi3.

Heroic replace Valdemar "valde" Bjørn Vangså with Patrick "es3tag" Hansen. North then removed Magisk from its roster and add valde; Magisk then joins OpTic Gaming in North America. Ninjas in Pyjamas move friberg to its inactive roster and replace him with Fredrik "REZ" Sterner from Epsilon eSports; friberg joins Magisk and allu to OpTic's roster.

mousesports release Christian "loWel" Antoran and longtime mousesports player Denis "denis" Howell from the lineup and replace them with former HellRaisers player Martin "STYKO" Styk and former PENTA Sports member Miikka "suNny" Kemppi. Also, Vladyslav "bondik" Nechyporchuk is dropped from the HellRaisers lineup and went on loan to the Chinese team TyLoo and trial Özgür "w0xic" Eker from Turkey and Issa "ISSAA" Murad from Jordan. Patrik "Zero" Žúdel later went inactive after citing a lack of confidence and HellRaisers playing poorly. HellRaisers signed Kristjan "FejtZ" Allsaar to take Zero's place.

Team LDLC.com replace Valentin "mistou" Balbastro with former Team EnVyUs rifler Timothée "DEVIL" Démolon.

Europe Results

Results
| | North | G2 | mouz | Fnatic | Na'Vi | nV | FaZe | Astralis | Heroic | NiP | LDLC | GOD | HR | BIG |
|---|---|---|---|---|---|---|---|---|---|---|---|---|---|---|
| North | | 9-16; 16-7 | 16-12; 16-14 | 16-8; 17-19 | 19-17; 19-16 | 16-6; 16-13 | 16-12; 4-16 | 10-16; 10-16 | 12-16; 16-11 | 16-5; 16-12 | 16-12; 16-9 | 16-12; 8-16 | 9-16; 16-9 | 16-8; 16-9 |
| G2 | 16-9; 7-16 | | 16-7; 22-25 | 9-16; 11-16 | 19-16; 16-14 | 9-16; 13-16 | 3-16; 12-16 | 16-9; 16-6 | 16-10; 16-14 | 14-16; 13-16 | 17-19; 16-5 | 16-11; 19-15 | 10-16; 16-13 | 14-16; 16-12 |
| mouz | 12-16; 14-16 | 7-16; 25-22 | | 11-16; 10-16 | 16-12; 16-11 | 11-16; 16-10 | 16-9; 14-16 | 5-16; 16-12 | 16-12; 13-16 | 16-2; 6-16 | 11-16; 12-16 | 16-6; 16-19 | 16-6; 10-16 | 22-20; 16-7 |
| Fnatic | 17-19; 16-19 | 16-9; 16-11 | 16-1; 16-10 | | 16-9; 5-16 | 16-10; 16-9 | 16-7; 16-12 | 16-4; 16-8 | 16-13; 19-16 | 7-16; 4-16 | 16-4; 16-6 | 12-16; 11-16 | 10-16; 19-17 | 16-9; 16-11 |
| Na'Vi | 8-16; 19-17 | 16-19; 14-16 | 12-16; 11-16 | 9-16; 16-5 | | 16-5; 14-16 | 6-16; 22-19 | 4-16; 15-19 | 10-16; 14-16 | 16-9; 13-16 | 16-14; 16-10 | 14-16; 16-9 | 5-16; 13-16 | 16-11; 16-12 |
| nV | 6-16; 13-16 | 16-9; 16-13 | 16-11; 10-16 | 10-16; 9-16 | 5-16; 16-14 | | 12-16; 7-16 | 16-6; 9-16 | 16-9; 10-16 | 15-19; 16-12 | 8-16; 22-25 | 16-13; 10-16 | 16-14; 19-16 | 16-4; 16-13 |
| FaZe | 12-16; 16-4 | 16-3; 16-12 | 9-16; 16-14 | 7-16; 12-16 | 16-6; 19-22 | 16-12; 16-7 | | 16-14; 15-19 | 16-4; 12-16 | 6-16; 16-7 | W-FF; W-FF^{1} | 16-4; 16-10 | 10-16; 12-16 | 16-8; 10-16 |
| Astralis | 16-19; 16-6 | 9-16; 6-16 | 16-5; 12-16 | 4-16; 8-16 | 16-4; 19-15 | 6-16; 9-16 | 14-16; 19-15 | | 16-6; 16-12 | 16-6; 16-14 | 16-11; 16-3 | 16-9; 8-16 | 16-10; 10-16 | 16-19; 16-6 |
| Heroic | 16-12; 11-16 | 10-16; 14-16 | 12-16; 16-13 | 13-16; 16-19 | 16-10; 16-14 | 9-16; 16-10 | 4-16; 16-12 | 6-16; 12-16 | | 21-25; 9-16 | 19-17; 16-6 | 16-10; 9-16 | 16-8; 16-14 | 15-19; 1-16 |
| NiP | 5-16; 12-16 | 16-14; 16-13 | 2-16; 16-6 | 19-17; 16-4 | 9-16; 16-13 | 19-15; 12-16 | 16-6; 7-16 | 6-16; 14-16 | 25-21; 16-9 | | 14-16; 17-19 | 19-16; 14-16 | 16-5; 16-6 | 16-4; 16-7 |
| LDLC | 12-16; 9-16 | 19-17; 5-16 | 16-11; 16-12 | 4-16; 6-16 | 14-16; 10-16 | 16-8; 25-22 | FF-W; FF-W^{1} | 11-16; 3-16 | 17-19; 6-16 | 16-14; 19-17 | | 16-9; 16-8 | 16-8; 14-16 | 16-12; 22-25 |
| GOD | 12-16; 16-8 | 11-16; 15-19 | 16-6; 19-16 | 16-12; 16-11 | 16-14; 9-16 | 13-16; 16-10 | 4-16; 10-16 | 9-16; 16-8 | 10-16; 16-9 | 14-16; 19-16 | 9-16; 8-16 | | 8-16; 2-16 | 8-16; 13-16 |
| HR | 16-9; 9-16 | 16-10; 13-16 | 6-16; 16-10 | 16-10; 17-19 | 5-16; 13-16 | 14-16; 16-19 | 16-10; 16-12 | 10-16; 16-10 | 8-16; 14-16 | 5-16; 6-16 | 8-16; 16-14 | 16-8; 16-2 | | 16-7; 11-16 |
| BIG | 8-16; 9-16 | 16-14; 12-16 | 20-22; 7-16 | 9-16; 11-16 | 11-16; 12-16 | 4-16; 13-16 | 8-16; 16-10 | 19-16; 6-16 | 19-15; 16-1 | 4-16; 7-16 | 12-16; 25-22 | 16-8; 16-13 | 7-16; 16-11 | |

^{1}Team LDLC.com had to forfeit its match against FaZe Clan due to the team traveling to DreamHack Denver 2017.

== Finals ==
The finalized teams are shown below. Each team's world ranking for December 4, 2017 is also shown.

North America

- OpTic Gaming (16)
- SK Gaming (1)
- Team Liquid (10)
- NRG Esports (26)
- Misfits (23)
- Luminosity Gaming (24)

Europe

- Fnatic (12)
- North (7)
- FaZe Clan (2)
- Astralis (3)
- Ninjas in Pyjamas (4)
- HellRaisers (22)

Between the end of the regular season and the playoffs, a few changes took place. Immortals loaned Ricardo "boltz" Prass to SK Gaming as João "felps" Vasconcellos asked to leave the team as the young star cited missing family back home in Brazil, a lack of confidence in playing, and not being very accustomed to the new role he was assigned when he joined SK, as he was an entry fragger when he was on Immortals but played the more passive lurker role upon joining SK. This would be the second time the SK roster would make a change before an EPL Final. During EPL Season 2, when the core of SK was with Luminosity Gaming, SK swapped out boltz and Lucas "steel" Lopes in favor of the Counter-Strike veteran Lincoln "fnx" Lau and the unknown Epitacio "TACO" de Melo. In addition, Team Liquid and Immortals agreed to transfer steel from the Brazilian team to the American team as Peter "stanislaw" Jarguz was benched as stanislaw claimed that he and Team Liquid's coach and former Immortals player and SK Gaming coach Wilton "zews" Prado disagreed on strategies in the game. However, EPL rules did not allow steel to play with Liquid for the Finals, then zews stepped in to fill the gap while steel took zew's spot as the coach. Astralis also had a last minute change, as Nicolai "dev1ce" Reedtz still out with an unknown sickness. The Danes would use the Norwegian and ex-North player Ruben "RUBINO" Villarroel for the event.

=== Broadcast talent ===
Host

- Oliver James "OJ Borg" Borg Anastasi

Desk host

- Alex "Machine" Richardson

Backstage reporter

- Tres "stunna" Saranthus

Commentators

- Hugo Byron
- Alex "Snodz" Byfield
- Henry "HenryG" Greer
- Vince Hill^{1}
- Jason "moses" O'Toole
- Jack "Jacky" Peters
- Harry "JustHarry" Russell
- Matthew "Sadokist" Trivett

Analysts

- Chad "SPUNJ" Burchill
- Janko "YNk" Paunović
- Jacob "Pimp" Winneche

Observers

- Bastian "UnknownFME" Faber
- Alex "Rushly" Rush

^{1}Lauren "Pansy" Scott was scheduled to cast at the event with moses, but had to sit out due to suspected food poisoning. Vince Hill took her spot.

=== Group stage ===
==== Selection process ====
With the new group pairing method, teams will choose one opponent they want to avoid in the group stage; the team that is chosen will be placed in the opposite group of the team that chose it. The selection took place on November 22, 2017. Groups were separated in a yellow group and a red group.

- Fnatic chose to be in the yellow group as the first seed (Y1), so OpTic Gaming was the first seed for the red group (R1).
- Fnatic chose SK Gaming as R2.
- OpTic Gaming chose FaZe Clan as Y2.
- SK Gaming chose Astralis as Y3.
- FaZe Clan chose North as R3.
- Astralis chose Ninjas in Pyjamas as R4.
- North chose Team Liquid as Y4.
- Ninjas in Pyjamas chose HellRaisers as Y5.
- Team Liquid chose Misfits as R5.
- HellRaisers chose NRG Esports as R6.
- Misfits, by default, was left with choosing Luminosity Gaming as Y6.

==== Group Yellow ====
Although Fnatic took the top spot in Europe during the regular season, FaZe Clan and Astralis were the clear favorites to top the group in Odense. However, Astralis would not be at the event with its star AWPer dev1ce, as he was on medical leave. Team Liquid would also be crippled as it could not use its newly acquired player steel and would be forced to play at the event with its coach zews. Fnatic was unproven to be a threat on LAN after the departure of dennis and olofmeister, but still managed to take the number one seed in both EPL and ECS. HellRaisers and Luminosity Gaming were both unproven teams, but both managed to sneak their way into the LAN finals. HellRaisers still had a relatively new roster as three of its five players were relatively new to the international scene. Luminosity came into the finals as the least likely to win the tournament, but the team was improving at a quick rate and proved its worth in North America as it beat out the world's number one in SK Gaming for the last spot at the ECS Season 4 Finals in Cancún. With all this, FaZe would be the clear favorites to run away with the group while the last two event would be up for grabs.

| Pos | Team | W-L | OT W-L | RF | RA | RD | Pts |
|---|---|---|---|---|---|---|---|
| 1 | FaZe Clan | 4-0 | 0-1 | 79 | 54 | +25 | 13 |
| 2 | HellRaisers | 3-1 | 0-1 | 70 | 54 | +3 | 10 |
| 3 | Fnatic | 2-1 | 2-0 | 69 | 66 | -7 | 8 |
| 4 | Luminosity Gaming | 1-3 | 1-0 | 68 | 67 | +1 | 5 |
| 5 | Astralis | 1-3 | 0-1 | 56 | 75 | -19 | 4 |
| 6 | Team Liquid | 0-3 | 1-1 | 53 | 79 | -26 | 3 |

Group Yellow matches
| Team | Score | Map | Score | Team |
|---|---|---|---|---|
| Fnatic | 19 | Inferno | 15 | FaZe Clan |
| HellRaisers | 23 | Cache | 25 | Luminosity Gaming |
| Astralis | 20 | Mirage | 22 | Team Liquid |
| Fnatic | 5 | Inferno | 16 | HellRaisers |
| FaZe Clan | 16 | Mirage | 14 | Team Liquid |
| Astralis | 16 | Train | 11 | Luminosity Gaming |
| Fnatic | 16 | Cobblestone | 13 | Luminosity Gaming |
| Team Liquid | 4 | Inferno | 16 | HellRaisers |
| FaZe Clan | 16 | Mirage | 5 | Astralis |
| Fnatic | 22 | Mirage | 18 | Team Liquid |
| Astralis | 13 | Overpass | 16 | HellRaisers |
| FaZe Clan | 16 | Train | 12 | Luminosity Gaming |
| FaZe Clan | 16 | Overpass | 7 | HellRaisers |
| Fnatic | 16 | Inferno | 7 | Astralis |
| Team Liquid | 4 | Cache | 16 | Luminosity Gaming |

The first few matches started out unexpectedly as the three teams that were most likely not going to be in the top three were in the top three as upsets came in from all over the place in the first four matches. However, things started to settle down, but HellRaisers still managed to top the group by the end of the day, while FaZe Clan struggled in its two matches after losing in overtime to Fnatic and barely scraping past Team Liquid.

FaZe showed what it was really capable of in the second day, as it breezed through competition, only somewhat struggling against Luminosity while stomping Astralis and Liquid. Fnatic had some signs of being its vintage self in the group stage as the team only suffered one loss. HellRaisers snagged the second seed in the group after taking down Astralis after upsetting a few teams. Luminosity exceeded expectations after garnering two wins and putting up close fights in its three losses, but Brazil's current second best team was out at fourth place. Meanwhile, Astralis and Liquid both struggled massively as both teams were crippled, as Astralis was without its star AWPer and Liquid was without one of the best lurkers in North America.

==== Group Red ====
In its last season in North America, OpTic Gaming left with a bang after taking the first seed in the league. However, in the few LAN appearances the team made, OpTic struggled as it failed to come out of the Boston Europe Minor, lost to Renegades in iBUYPOWER Masters, and were trounced by SK Gaming at IEM Oakland. SK Gaming had much more success after acquiring boltz on loan; it made the semifinals at IEM Oakland, won EPICENTER 2017, and came back from a 0–9 deficit against Astralis to win BLAST Pro Series. North had been relatively quiet in recent, as it could not make the playoffs the last two tournaments it went to. Ninjas in Pyjamas surprised everyone after defeating SK Gaming and FaZe Clan, the clear top two at the time, at IEM Oakland to win the tournament, but it was perhaps more of a fluke as it bombed out of the group stage at BLAST Pro Series and failed to make the major for the third straight time. Misfits was a new face at the EPL Finals, as sgares finally started showing signs of leading his team to the top of North America once again, as he was the captain of the team that was arguably the best team North America had ever seen, with qualifications at the EPL Finals and the Boston Major qualifier; however, the lack of experience might set the team back. NRG Esports would be the known as the team that would always so well online, but would always fail to do anything on the big stage. Despite this being NRG's third straight appearance at an EPL final, the team was expected to go out of the tournament in last place. SK Gaming would be the clear favorite to take the group, but the Brazilians have always struggled in the robin round group stages, as they would always do well one day and then do horribly the next day. North was also another favorite to make it out of the group stage while the last spot would need to be fought for.

| Pos | Team | W-L | OT W-L | RF | RA | RD | Pts |
|---|---|---|---|---|---|---|---|
| 1 | SK Gaming | 4-1 | 0-0 | 78 | 48 | +30 | 12 |
| 2 | OpTic Gaming | 3-2 | 0-0 | 73 | 59 | +14 | 9 |
| 3 | Misfits | 3-2 | 0-0 | 65 | 65 | 0 | 9 |
| 4 | NRG Esports | 2-3 | 0-0 | 55 | 71 | -16 | 6 |
| 5 | Ninjas in Pyjamas | 1-3 | 1-0 | 61 | 67 | -6 | 5 |
| 6 | North | 1-3 | 0-1 | 56 | 78 | -22 | 4 |

Group Red matches
| Team | Score | Map | Score | Team |
|---|---|---|---|---|
| SK Gaming | 16 | Overpass | 7 | North |
| Misfits | 16 | Overpass | 11 | NRG Esports |
| OpTic Gaming | 14 | Cobblestone | 16 | Ninjas in Pyjamas |
| North | 9 | Cobblestone | 16 | Misfits |
| OpTic Gaming | 16 | Mirage | 14 | SK Gaming |
| Ninjas in Pyjamas | 14 | Overpass | 16 | NRG Esports |
| North | 9 | Mirage | 16 | NRG Esports |
| OpTic Gaming | 16 | Overpass | 10 | Misfits |
| SK Gaming | 16 | Overpass | 9 | Ninjas in Pyjamas |
| OpTic Gaming | 11 | Overpass | 16 | North |
| Ninjas in Pyjamas | 13 | Overpass | 16 | Misfits |
| SK Gaming | 16 | Cache | 9 | NRG Esports |
| SK Gaming | 16 | Cache | 7 | Misfits |
| North | 15 | Inferno | 19 | Ninjas in Pyjamas |
| OpTic Gaming | 16 | Cobblestone | 3 | NRG Esports |

The season 5 runner-up struggled immensely as it failed to put up double digits against any team, including against the two worst ranked teams in the tournament. North going 0-3 almost guaranteed that the Danes would not play in front of its home crowd in the playoffs. Meanwhile, NRG Esports surprised everyone by defeating Ninjas in Pyjamas (NiP) and North after not winning a single game in its two previous EPL finals. Misfits also did well after defeating NRG and upsetting North. OpTic Gaming upset SK Gaming and put up a fight against NiP and also ran away with a win against Misfits in the late stages of the game. SK easily defeated North, but fell short to OpTic. OpTic, NRG, and Misfits ended up on top at the end of day one when all three teams were projected to be at the bottom of the barrel.

SK strayed away from its old self as it dominated the second day of the robin round rather than struggling like FalleN's squad usually does. The team won all three games it played to easily take the top seed in the group. Misfits continued to roll through as it upset NiP in regulation, officially eliminating NiP and clinching a spot in the playoffs. With NRG's loss to SK and OpTic's loss to North, the last spot would be decided in the final map, which pitted the last two contenders. There, OpTic dominated the field to advance to the playoffs and eliminated NRG. North did much better in the second day, but garnering zero wins in the first day hurt the Danes massively; when Misfits defeated NiP, this guaranteed that only two Danes would play in front of the home crowd, as Astralis was eliminated in the first group, North was eliminated early, and NRG – which had the Dane Allan "AnJ" Jensen – was eliminated by OpTic. Finn "karrigan" Andersen from FaZe and Emil "Magisk" Reif from OpTic would be the only Danes to play in front of Odense's crowd. NiP got some consolation by defeating North, but the final three was set in the end.

=== Playoffs ===
==== Bracket ====
Round of 6
R2 | OpTic Gaming | 1
Y3 | Fnatic | 2
Y2 | HellRaisers | 0
R3 | Misfits | 2

Semifinals
Y1 | FaZe Clan | 2
Y3 | Fnatic | 0
R1 | SK Gaming | 2
R3 | Misfits | 0

Finals
Y1 | FaZe Clan | 1
R1 | SK Gaming | 3

==== Round of Six ====
The first game in front of the Odense crowd was a thriller as it pitted the newly formed OpTic Gaming against the legendary team of Fnatic. OpTic managed to come back from a relatively weak first half to winning the last ten of twelve rounds to take game one. In game two, KRiMZ showed his old self again as he dominated and held down OpTic on the counter-terrorist side as he and flusha dominated the first half, allowing Fnatic to take the second game. In the third game, despite HS's performance, everyone on Fnatic helped out as the strong start to the second half proved to be just enough to eliminate OpTic from the tournament.

The two surprises of the tournament faced off in the second quarterfinals. The first game was a marathon, but Misfits was able to pull through in double overtime to take the first map. The second map was a struggle for HellRaisers as it was swept out by Misfits's offense in the second half to allow Misfits to earn a trip against SK Gaming.

Round of 6 scores
| Team | Score | Map | Score | Team |
|---|---|---|---|---|
| OpTic Gaming | 16 | Inferno | 14 | Fnatic |
| OpTic Gaming | 10 | Train | 16 | Fnatic |
| OpTic Gaming | 14 | Mirage | 16 | Fnatic |
| HellRaisers | 18 | Cobblestone | 22 | Misfits |
| HellRaisers | 6 | Overpass | 16 | Misfits |
| HellRaisers | – | Cache | – | Misfits |

==== Semifinals ====
karrigan played very well compared to his normal playstyle with all the Danes watching him live; combined with his strategies and all the firepower he had around him, karrigan was able to easily take down olofmeister's old team with relative ease on both maps. Although flusha continued to do well at the event, KRiMZ could not find the same form he did yesterday against OpTic.

Misfits started its semifinals strong as it took a 3–0 lead, but SK never gave the Americans and French to breathe again as it dominated in almost every facet of the first game. The second game was a complete stomp by SK despite starting on the less-favored side, as the only round Misfits got was off of a lucky shot off of ShahZaM when he got two kills with one shot. SK sent the Misfits home.

Semifinals scores
| Team | Score | Map | Score | Team |
|---|---|---|---|---|
| FaZe Clan | 16 | Mirage | 7 | Fnatic |
| FaZe Clan | 16 | Overpass | 10 | Fnatic |
| FaZe Clan | – | Inferno | – | Fnatic |
| SK Gaming | 16 | Cobblestone | 6 | Misfits |
| SK Gaming | 16 | Overpass | 1 | Misfits |
| SK Gaming | – | Cache | – | Misfits |

==== Finals ====
The final matchup was the expected one. This tournament was the second to last tournament of the year (ECS Season 4 being the last event) before the designated player break before the major. However, this would be SK's last tournament of the year as it failed to make the top four in North America of ECS, placing fifth. FaZe did qualify for the ECS finals, but the team had to play in the major qualifier as it bombed out of groups in the last major. This final would also possibly decide which team would take the spot for the best team of the year, as the two teams continually went back and forth for the number one spot.

karrigan had never defeated FalleN in any series more than a best of one, and he had a great opportunity to start strong on Inferno as the map had always been one of SK's weakest. However, SK made the game close and the last few rounds went back and forth between the two teams. However, FaZe prevailed in the map it should have won comfortably on to take the early series lead. Overpass was the second map and it was a map in which karrigan had never defeated FalleN on in the history between the two captains and that trend continued as SK's counter-terrorist side shut down FaZe's offense to tie the series at one. FaZe was expected to take Mirage, especially since SK lost to OpTic in the group stage. However, SK completely dominated the map as much of FaZe struggled. FaZe showed some life in the second half, but it was too late to do much with SK's huge lead. Train was the next map and SK once completely dominated the map when it had Lincoln "fnx" Lau on the team and many of those games included not allowing a single round on its counter-terrorist side, including a 16–0 against G2 Esports. The 8–0 lead that SK took eventually was whittled down to an 8–7 lead as rain was holding the team together throughout the half. After FaZe took a lead, SK took it back, but FaZe sent the game into overtime. SK eventually won out the overtime and the tournament to take its second EPL title. FalleN continued his win streak against karrigan as well.

Finals scores
| Team | Score | Map | Score | Team |
|---|---|---|---|---|
| FaZe Clan | 16 | Inferno | 13 | SK Gaming |
| FaZe Clan | 11 | Overpass | 16 | SK Gaming |
| FaZe Clan | 9 | Mirage | 16 | SK Gaming |
| FaZe Clan | 16 | Train | 19 | SK Gaming |
| FaZe Clan | – | Cache | – | SK Gaming |

=== Finals standings ===
Final Standings
| Place | Prize Money | Team |
|---|---|---|
| 1st | US$225,000 | SK Gaming |
| 2nd | US$100,000 | FaZe Clan |
| 3rd – 4th | US$60,000 | Fnatic |
| 3rd – 4th | US$60,000 | Misfits |
| 5th – 6th | US$45,000 | HellRaisers |
| 5th – 6th | US$45,000 | OpTic Gaming |
| 7th – 8th | US$40,000 | Luminosity Gaming |
| 7th – 8th | US$40,000 | NRG Esports |
| 9th – 10th | US$35,000 | Astralis |
| 9th – 10th | US$35,000 | Ninjas in Pyjamas |
| 11th – 12th | US$32,500 | North |
| 11th – 12th | US$32,500 | Team Liquid |
