= Space Soldiers (esports) =

Turkish esports organization

- Full name: Space Gaming A.Ş.
- Short name: SpaceS
- Sport: CS:GO; FIFA 17
- Founded: 2014
- Disbanded: October 2018
- Location: Istanbul, Turkey
- Colours: Yellow and Black
- CEO: Bünyamin Aydın
- Head coach: Canpolat "hardstyle" Yıldıran
- Captain: Engin "MAJ3R" Küpeli
- Main sponsor: ByNoGame.com

Space Soldiers was a Turkish professional esports organization founded in 2014 by Bünyamin Aydın. The organization consisted of a Counter-Strike: Global Offensive division and a FIFA division, the former of which also had an academy team.

The Counter-Strike team was created in January 2015. It had minor roster changes in early 2016. The team attended two Major championships, ELEAGUE Major: Boston 2018 and FACEIT Major: London 2018. They also finished 2nd in WESG 2017.

The organization ceased operations on 13 October 2018 after it controversially parted ways with its Counter-Strike team.

== History ==
In 2014, the organization was founded as Space Gaming A.Ş. by Turkish investor Bünyamin Aydın.

=== Counter-Strike: Global Offensive ===
Space Soldiers announced its CS:GO team on 17 January 2015, consisting of Emre "e1" Biçer, Ismailcan "XANTARES" Dörtkardeş, Cihan "ONLY" Gönek, Tugay "TuGuX" Keskin and Çağatay "DESPE" Sedef. The first roster change came in January 2016, when e1 was dropped in favour of Engin "ngiN" Kor. Ahmet "paz" Karahoca made his debut with Space Soldiers on 18 February. A month later, Space Soldiers reached the semi-finals of Copenhagen Games 2016.

On 15 November 2016, the team released TuGuX. He was replaced by Engin "MAJ3R" Küpeli, who joined on trial on 26 November. He was officially signed to the team on 8 February 2017. On 13 February, Space Soldiers signed Buğra "Calyx" Arkın to create a six-man roster. In September 2017, Space Soldiers won the GeForce Cup 2017. During the same month, the team qualified for ESL One Cologne 2017. The team went against SK Gaming, the number 1 ranked team at the time, in the first match, and won the game 16–14. The team lost the other three games, finishing the tournament in 12-14th.

In January 2018, Space Soldiers became the first Turkish team to qualify for a Major by securing a spot in the ELEAGUE Major: Boston 2018 after defeating AVANGAR, Misfits Gaming and mousesports in the Challengers stage. This meant that the team and players also got in-game stickers of themselves. The team beat the eventual champions Cloud9 during their second game in the Major, but later lost to mousesports and was eliminated without making it to the play-offs. The team reached the grand final of WESG 2017 after beating GODSENT and Team Russia in the quarter-finals and semi-finals respectively. In the grand-final, Space Soldiers faced Fnatic, and were ahead 14–7 on the final map, but lost 14–16 after a comeback.

In March 2018, Space Soldiers was ranked as the 12th best team by HLTV's weekly updated rankings. In June, the team won DreamHack Open Austin 2018 after beating Rogue in 2–1 the final. ngiN failed to get a visa in time for the FACEIT Major: London in September, which meant that coach Canpolat "hardstyle" Yıldıran had to play instead of him. The team lost all three matches they played in the main qualifier.

Space Soldiers was invited to BLAST Pro Series Istanbul which took place on 28–29 September 2018. The team finished the tournament in 4th in front of home crowd. On 13 October 2018, it was announced that the organization parted ways with its CS:GO players. The decision to separate was made a month prior, on 15 September.

=== FIFA ===
The organization had Emre "Riv9" Kayır under contract, who participated in World Cup qualifiers in December 2017. In March 2018, he went to Barcelona to participate in the FUT 18 Champions Cup.

== Achievements ==
In the last 3 years of existence, the team has stayed with the same core players, with the following achievements:

Tournament	Tier	Placement
DreamHack Austin 2018	A-Tier	1st
ESL Pro League Season 7 Europe	S-Tier	5th
WESG 2017	S-Tier	2nd
ELEAGUE Major 2018 European Minor	A-Tier	1st
ESEA MDL Season 25 Global Challenge	A-Tier	1st
GeForce Cup 2017	B-Tier	1st
WESG 2016	S-Tier	4th
WESG Middle East Championship 2016	B-Tier	1st
ASUS Rog Summer 2016	B-Tier	1st
Copenhagen Games 2016	A-Tier	3rd-4th

== Controversies ==
=== ESL ban ===
In September 2017, Space Soldiers' 6th and reserve player, Çağatay "DESPE" Sedef got banned for 2 years by ESL, making him unable to stand-in in ESL tournaments in case it was needed. Space Soldiers made an announcement on Twitter, saying that they were in talk with the German organizers. Eventually, the ban was lifted by ESL, saying that the ban was unwarranted.

=== Spitting incident ===
On 13 June 2018, Space Soldiers played the opening match of ESL One Belo Horizonte 2018 against home heroes SK Gaming. In the opening ceremony, the players passed through the fans. After the match, Engin "MAJ3R" Küpeli said on Twitter that some of the fans spat on them. Players of SK Gaming responded saying that they are sorry for what happened. 2 days later at signing day, MAJ3R received a letter of apology from multiple fans.

=== Disbanding ===
In May 2018, all CS:GO players changed their profile pictures on Steam to completely black, instead of the logo of Space Soldiers. There were rumours about the low salaries of players long before this. In September 2018, the two sides agreed to part their ways, but not before they attended a major tournament in home soil Turkey, BLAST Pro Series Istanbul, for the last time. In an interview later, former Space Soldiers captain Engin "MAJ3R" Küpeli said that the organization "didn't fulfill the promises made" and that "it was run by amateurs." He added that he really liked the Aydın family, but said that they hired people who didn't have any experience in esports and that Bünyamin Aydın was busy with his clothing company.
