= World Electronic Sports Games =

International eSports tournament held in China

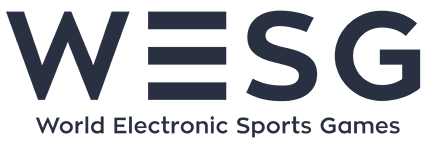
- Status: Active
- Genre: Esports tournament
- Locations: Shanghai (2016); Haikou (2017); Chongqing (2018, 2019)
- Country: China
- Years active: 4
- Inaugurated: December 2016
- Organizer: AliSports

World Electronic Sports Games (WESG) is an international esports championship tournament based in Shanghai and organized by AliSports. The first edition has a total prize pool of over US$5.5 million. The inaugural WESG season was held in 2016, with the Counter-Strike: Global Offensive world finals taking place in Changzhou, China, from 12 to 15 January 2017.

The World Electronic Sports Games heavily bases itself on the Olympic Games. In the first 3 years, teams had to be composed of players of the same nationality to emphasize national pride, making it unique in the esports world. As a result of this, some national teams were formed only to play in WESG. This rule was softened for the 2019 edition (and possibly onwards), with teams being allowed to have 2 foreign members. The event also has separate tournaments for men and women. Tournaments generally follow single-elimination rules.

== Games ==
The following games were featured. In 2017, WESG expanded Counter-Strike: Global Offensive and Hearthstone to include female tournaments.

- Counter Strike
- Dota 2
- Hearthstone
- Starcraft II

== Tournament history ==
=== 2016 ===
As of March 2016, qualifying rounds for the first edition were expected to begin in April 2016. The event took place in Shangai.

Despite the large prize pools, many top contenders were not at the event, especially with CS:GO's first major of 2017 right around the corner. WESG 2016 for Counter-Strike: Global Offensive (CS:GO) was the last premier tournament before the ELEAGUE Major 2017. France's Team EnVyUs beat out Poland's Team Kinguin to take home the majority of CS:GO's biggest prize pool while Poland's number one took third place by defeating Turkey's Space Soldiers before booking a ticket to Atlanta for the major.

In Dota 2, the Filipino team TNC Pro Team downed Denmark's Cloud9 to take the grand prize. Alliance from Sweden took down Peru's hopeful Infamous to take the bronze.

In Starcraft 2, Koreans dominated as expected as Jun "TY" Tae-yang defeated compatriot Cho "Maru" Seong-ju. In the third place match, America's Alex "Neeb" Sunderhaft took down Tobias "ShoWTimE" Sieber of Germany.

Hearthstone's champion was the Philippines's Euneil "Staz" Javiñas took down Sweden's Jon "Orange" Westberg in a close grand final. The third-place match featured two Germans, and it was Raphael "BunnyHoppor" Peltzer to topple Sebastian "Xixo" Bentert.

Results
Game	Prize Pool	Winner	Runner-up	Third	Fourth
Counter-Strike: Global Offensive	US$1,500,000	(France) Team EnVyUs	(Poland) Team Kinguin	(Poland) Virtus.pro	(Turkey) Space Soldiers
Dota 2	US$1,500,000	(Philippines) TNC Predator	(Denmark) Cloud9	(Sweden) Alliance	(Peru) Infamous
Starcraft 2	US$402,000	(South Korea) TY	(South Korea) JAGW | Maru	(United States) ting | Neeb	(Germany) Arma | ShoWTimE
Hearthstone	US$300,000	(Philippines) PHA | Staz	(Sweden) [A] | Orange	(Germany) VP | BunnyHoppor	(Germany) CLG | Xixo

=== 2017 ===
Despite being called WESG 2017, the event took place in March 2018, with the location being Haikou.

In CS:GO, with the major already past, more top teams showed up. However, teams such as SK Gaming from Brazil, which was the second most decorated team in CS:GO and world number two, and Cloud9 from the United States, which was the reigning major champions and world number three, were knocked out earlier than expected while teams such as MVP PK from South Korea and Team One from Brazil, two teams that hadn't even qualified for the major, made it much further into the bracket than expected. Sweden's Fnatic came back from a large deficit against the Space Soldiers from Turkey to take home the WESG 2017 title for Fnatic's second straight premier tournament win.

Team Russia stopped the Cinderella story of Team One in the third-place match. Dota 2 saw Team Russia take out Brazil's paiN Gaming. Team Hellas from Greece shut down the hometown Rock.Y from China in the third-place match.

South Korea dominated again in Starcraft 2 as Maru redeemed himself from last year after being the runner-up to winning the title after taking down compatriot Park "Dark" Ryung-woo. Kim "Classic" Doh-woo could not make it three Koreans in a row as he fell to Finland's Joona "Serral" Sotala in the third-place match.

Hearthstone saw Turkey's Kaan "Fujitora" Çekli defeat Michael "Luker" Luker from Canada to take home the grand prize. The unknown posesi from Japan took third place after defeating Thailand's Kantaphon "ScreaM" Suwanmalee. CS:GO's female grand final saw a close series as Russian Forces scraped past LLG Gaming of China to take home all but US$100,000 of the prize pool. In the third place match, Those Damn Canadians defeated the experienced Team Sweden. Hearthstone's female grand final featured the two Chinese qualifiers as GLHuiHui defeated Lioon. Cordelia "Scarakye" Chui from the UK lost HongKong's Ip Yan in the third-place match.

Results
Game	Prize Pool	Winner	Runner-up	Third	Fourth
Counter-Strike: Global Offensive	US$1,500,000	(Sweden) Fnatic	(Turkey) Space Soldiers	Team Russia	(Brazil) Team One
CS:GO Female	US$170,000	(Russia) Russian Forces	(China) LLG Gaming	(Canada) Those Damn Canadians	Team Sweden
Dota 2	US$1,500,000	Team Russia	(Brazil) paiN Gaming	(Greece) Team Hellas	(China) Rock.Y
Starcraft 2	US$402,000	(South Korea) JAGW | Maru	(South Korea) Dark	(Finland) Ence | Serral	(South Korea) Classic
Hearthstone	US$300,000	(Turkey) RB | Fujitora	(Canada) TGS | Luker	(Japan) posesi	(Thailand) AR | ScreaM
Hearthstone Female	US$51,000	(China) GLHuiHui	(China) Liooon	(Hong Kong) Yan	(United Kingdom) Scarakye

=== 2018 ===
Despite being called WESG 2018, the event took place in March 2019, with the location being Chongqing.

The WESG 2018 tournament started only a week after IEM Katowice 2019, the first CS:GO major of 2019. This made it impossible for most top teams to participate. The only top teams in the tournament were G2, who got eliminated early from the major and fnatic, who failed to qualify to the major. Brazilian MIBR managed to participate as well, despite reaching the semi-finals in the major. This meant that they flew from Poland to China only a few days before the event. The jetlag caused an early but expected exit from the tournament in the quarter-finals, where they lost against Windigo. In the semi-finals, Polish AGO defeated fnatic and Windigo defeated G2 to advance to the grand-final. The third place decider between French G2 and Swedish fnatic was won by the French team. In the grand-final, Bulgarian Windigo won against AGO to become champion. The prize money of US$500,000 was received more than a year after the tournament ended.

Results
Game	Prize Pool	Winner	Runner-up	Third	Fourth
Counter-Strike: Global Offensive	US$890,000	(Bulgaria) Windigo	(Poland) AGO	(France) G2	(Sweden) fnatic
CS:GO Female	US$105,000	(United States) CLG Red	(Russia) Lazarus fe	(Canada) Those Damn Canadians	(Australia) Carnage fe
Dota 2	US$890,000	(Philippines) TNC Predator	(China) Keen Gaming	(Russia) White-Off	Team Ukraine
StarCraft 2	US$240,000	(South Korea) TR | iNnoVation	(Finland) ENCE | Serral	(South Korea) JAGW | Maru	(Canada) Newbee | Scarlett
Hearthstone	US$300,000	(Canada) GO | purple	(Taiwan) MalygosTW	(Japan) Alex	(United States) justsaiyan
Hearthstone Female	US$35,000	(South Korea) 다롱이	(Belgium) BabyBear	(United States) Justine	(China) yogurt

=== 2019 ===
The 2019 event was scheduled to take place in the first quarter of 2020, with the location being Chongqing, but was postponed to an unknown date due to COVID-19. Some regional qualifiers had already taken place. The one-nationality rule was softened in 2019.

As of June 2023, the tournament had not been officially cancelled, but no plans for its continuation had been announced.

Results
Game	Prize Pool	Winner	Runner-up	Third	Fourth
Counter-Strike: Global Offensive	US$1,000,000	TBD	TBD	TBD	TBD
Dota 2	US$800,000	TBD	TBD	TBD	TBD
StarCraft 2	US$300,000	TBD	TBD	TBD	TBD
