= ESL One Cologne 2017 =

- 2017

Tournament information
- Sport: Counter-Strike: Global Offensive
- Location: Cologne, Germany
- Dates: July 7, 2017–July 9, 2017
- Administrator: Electronic Sports League (ESL)
- Tournament format(s): 16 team swiss group stage Eight team single-elimination playoff
- Venue: Lanxess Arena
- Teams: 16 teams
- Purse: US$250,000

Final positions
- Champions: SK Gaming
- 1st runners-up: Cloud9
- 2nd runners-up: FaZe Clan; Natus Vincere
- MVP: Gabriel "FalleN" Toledo

ESL One Cologne 2017 was a Counter-Strike: Global Offensive tournament run by ESL. In July 2017, sixteen teams from around the globe competed in an offline (LAN) tournament that featured a group stage and playoffs with a US$250,000 prize pool. It was the last premier event before the PGL 2017 Krakow Major Championship. In addition, this Cologne event was the first ever Cologne tournament to not host a major as Valve decided to pass over the historic tournament series in favor of the PGL Major.

This tournament was also the first tournament of the Intel Grand Slam, which a list of tournaments run by ESL and DreamHack. The first team to win four titles earns an extra $1,000,000.

== Format ==
ESL invited twelve teams to compete in the tournament. Two teams from Europe, one team from North America, and one team from China competed for the last four spots in three different qualifiers. The group stage was a sixteen team Swiss tournament. The playoffs was an eight team, single elimination best of three bracket, but the grand finals was a best of five.

=== Map Pool ===
The event will use Valve's Active Duty map pool.

Maps

- Cache
- Cobblestone
- Inferno
- Mirage
- Nuke
- Overpass
- Train

== Broadcast Talent ==
Host

- Paul "ReDeYe" Chaloner

Desk Host

- Alex "Machine" Richardson

Reporter

- Tres "stunna" Saranthus

Analysts

- Chad "SPUNJ" Burchill
- Adam "friberg" Friberg
- Janko "YNk" Paunović

Commentators

- Anders Blume
- Hugo Byron
- Henry "HenryG" Greer
- Christian "Chrispian" Hart
- Auguste "Semmler" Massonnat
- Jason "moses" O'Toole
- Jack "Jacky" Peters
- Harry "JustHarry" Russell
- Lauren "Pansy" Scott
- Matthew "Sadokist" Trivett

Observers

- Patricia von Halle
- Heather "sapphiRe" Garrozo
- DJ "Prius" Kuntz

== Qualifiers ==
Two teams from Europe, one team from North America, and one team from China will qualify for the tournament.

=== European Qualifier ===
8 invited teams, the winner of ESL Meisterschaft, and the qualifiers from the two open qualifiers participated in the closed qualifier.

==== Teams ====
- FlipSid3 Tactics (Invited)
- GODSENT (Invited)
- Heroic (Invited)
- Space Soldiers (Invited)
- Team Dignitas (Invited)
- Team EnVyUs (Invited)
- Team Kinguin (Invited)
- Tricked Esport (Invited)
- BIG (ESL Meisterschaft)
- Outlaws (Open Qualifier 1)
- k29 (Open Qualifier 2)
- Tundra Esports (Open Qualifier 2)

First round
BIG	2
FlipSid3 Tactics	0
Team Dignitas	2
k29	0
Team Kinguin	1
Tundra Esports	2
Space Soldiers	2
Outlaws	0

Quarterfinals
Heroic	2
BIG	0
Tricked Esport	0
Team Dignitas	2
GODSENT	2
Tundra Esports	0
Team EnVyUs	0
Space Soldiers	2

Semifinals
Heroic	2
Team Dignitas	0
GODSENT	0
Space Soldiers	2

Qualified
Heroic
Space Soldiers

=== North American Qualifier ===
4 invited teams and 2 teams from the open qualifiers played in the North American qualifier. One team moves on to ESL One Cologne 2017.

==== Teams ====
- Counter Logic Gaming (Invited)
- Misfits (Invited)
- Renegades (Invited)
- Team Liquid (Invited)
- Splyce (Open Qualifier 1)
- compLexity Gaming (Open Qualifier 2)

Round of 6
Renegades	2
compLexity Gaming	0
Misfits	2
Splyce	0

Round of 4
Counter Logic Gaming	2
Renegades	0
Team Liquid	2
Misfits	1

Qualified
Counter Logic Gaming	0
Team Liquid	2

=== Chinese Qualifier ===
One team from the China qualifier will advance to the tournament. They will play in a 16 team, single elimination bracket.

==== Teams ====
- B.O.O.T.cn (Invited)
- Eastern Mysterious Power (Invited)
- Eclipse (Invited)
- Flash Gaming (Invited)
- NEW4 (Invited)
- TyLoo (Invited)
- UYA (Invited)
- ViCi Gaming (Invited)
- Acme Exclamation (Open Qualifier)
- Five eSports Club (Open Qualifier)
- Green.Gaming (Open Qualifier)
- LCD Gaming (Open Qualifier)
- Lynx (Open Qualifier)
- Recall THE END (Open Qualifier)
- Sports.Power Clan (Open Qualifier)
- To.be.or.not.to.be (Open Qualifier)

Round of 16
TyLoo	2
Sports.Power Clan	0
NEW4	2
Lynx	0
Flash Gaming	2
Invictus Gaming	0
B.O.O.T.cn	2
Five eSports Club	0
Eastern Mysterious Power	1
LGD Gaming	2
ViCi Gaming	2
Recall THE END	0
UYA	2
To.be.or.not.to.be	1
Eclipse	2
Acme Exclamation	0

Round of 8
TyLoo	2
NEW4	0
Flash Gaming	2
B.O.O.T.cn	0
LGD Gaming	0
ViCi Gaming	2
UYA	2
Eclipse	0

Round of 4
TyLoo	2
Flash Gaming	0
Vici Gaming	2
UYA	1

Qualifier
TyLoo	2
ViCi Gaming	0

== Teams Competing ==
- Cloud9 (Invited)
- FaZe Clan (Invited)
- Fnatic (Invited)
- G2 Esports (Invited)
- Immortals (Invited)
- mousesports (Invited)
- Natus Vincere (Invited)
- Ninjas in Pyjamas (Invited)
- North (Invited)
- OpTic Gaming (Invited)
- SK Gaming (Invited)
- Virtus.pro (Invited)
- Heroic (EU Qualifier)
- Space Soldiers (EU Qualifier)
- Team Liquid (NA Qualifier)
- TyLoo (CN Qualifier)

== Group stage ==
In the first round, teams from pool 1 will be matched up against teams in pool 4. Teams in pool 2 will play teams in pool 3. Each team's pool was determined by the tournament organizers.

In the second round, the winners in the first round will face each other in the "high" matches, in which teams with a 1–0 record will play against each other; the losers will face each other in the "low" matches, in which teams with a 0–1 record will play each other.

In the third round, the winners of the high matches (teams with 2-0 records) from round two will face each other. The winners of these two matches will qualify for the major. The losers of the high round and the winners of the low round (teams with 1-1 records) will face each other in the "mid" matches. The losers from the previous low matches (teams with 0-2 records) will face each other in round three's low matches. The losers of these low matches are eliminated. Twelve teams remain in the Qualifier.

In the fourth round, the losers of the high matches and the winners of the mid matches (teams with 2-1 records) will face each other in round four's high matches. The winners of those high matches qualify for the major. The losers of the mid matches and the winners of the low matches (teams with 1-2 records) will face each other in the low matches of round four. The losers of these matches are eliminated from the Qualifier. Six teams remain.

In the last round, the remaining teams will face off (teams with 2-2 records). The winners of these matches will qualify for the major and the losing teams will be eliminated.

Place	Team	Record	RD	Round 1	Round 2	Round 3	Round 4	Round 5
1–2	Team Liquid	3–0	+24	Natus Vincere; 16-7; Inferno	Immortals; 19-15; Train	OpTic Gaming; 16-5; Cobblestone	Playoffs	Playoffs
1–2	Ninjas in Pyjamas	3-0	+20	Cloud9; 16-12; Cache	G2 Esports; 16-6; Cache	mousesports 16-10; Cache	Playoffs	Playoffs
3–5	Natus Vincere	3-1	+12	Team Liquid; 7-16; Inferno	Cloud9; 34-32; Train	Space Soldiers; 16-9; Train	mousesports 16-4; Mirage	Playoffs
3–5	G2 Esports	3-1	+11	TyLoo; 16-9; Cache	Ninjas in Pyjamas; 6-16; Cache	Immortals; 16-7; Cobblestone	SK Gaming; 16-11; Inferno	Playoffs
3–5	OpTic Gaming	3-1	+9	North; 16-9; Cobblestone	Space Soldiers; 16-9; Mirage	Team Liquid; 5-16; Cobblestone	FaZe Clan; 16-10; Train	Playoffs
6–8	SK Gaming	3-2	+16	Space Soldiers; 14-16; Cache	Virtus.pro; 16-9; Mirage	North; 16-10; Cache	G2 Esports; 16-11; Inferno	Fnatic; 16-6; Mirage
6–8	Cloud9	3-2	+8	Ninjas in Pyjamas; 12-16; Cache	Natus Vincere; 32-34; Train	TyLoo; 16-9; Cobblestone	Immortals; 16-11; Train	mousesports 22-20; Inferno
6–8	FaZe Clan	3-2	+5	Heroic; 16-14; Inferno	mousesports 12-16; Nuke	Fnatic; 16-12; Overpass	OpTic Gaming; 10-16; Train	North; 16-7; Inferno
9–11	Fnatic	2-3	+4	mousesports 11-16; Train	Heroic; 16-6; Mirage	FaZe Clan; 12-16; Overpass	Space Soldiers; 16-3; Mirage	SK Gaming; 6-16; Mirage
9–11	North	2-3	-10	OpTic Gaming; 9-16; Cobblestone	TyLoo; 16-6; Inferno	SK Gaming; 10-16; Cache	Heroic; 14-16; Inferno	FaZe Clan; 7-16; Inferno
9–11	mousesports	2-3	-11	Fnatic; 16-11; Train	FaZe Clan; 16-12; Nuke	Ninjas in Pyjamas; 10-16; Cache	Natus Vincere; 4-16; Mirage	Cloud9; 20-22; Inferno
12–14	Heroic	1-3	-7	FaZe Clan; 14-16; Inferno	Fnatic; 6-16; Mirage	Virtus.pro; 9-16; Cobblestone	North; 14-16; Inferno	Eliminated
12–14	Immortals	1-3	-14	Virtus.pro; 16-12; Cobblestone	Team Liquid; 15-19; Train	G2 Esports; 7-16; Cobblestone	Cloud9; 11-16; Train	Eliminated
12–14	Space Soldiers	1-3	-25	SK Gaming; 16-14; Cache	OpTic Gaming; 9-16; Mirage	Natus Vincere; 9-16; Train	Fnatic; 3-16; Mirage	Eliminated
15–16	Virtus.pro	0-3	-18	Immortals; 12-16; Cobblestone	SK Gaming; 9-16; Mirage	Heroic; 9-16; Cobblestone	Eliminated	Eliminated
15–16	TyLoo	0–3	-24	G2 Esports; 9-16; Cache	North; 6-16; Inferno	Cloud9; 9-16; Cobblestone	Eliminated	Eliminated

== Playoffs ==
=== Playoffs Bracket ===
Quarterfinals
Natus Vincere	2
G2 Esports	0
Ninjas in Pyjamas	1
Cloud9	2
Team Liquid	0
FaZe Clan	2
OpTic Gaming	0
SK Gaming	2

Semifinals
Natus Vincere	0
Cloud9	2
FaZe Clan	0
SK Gaming	2

Finals
Cloud9	0
SK Gaming	3

=== Quarterfinals ===
Quarterfinals
Team	Score	Map	Score	Team
Natus Vincere	19	Overpass	17	G2 Esports
Natus Vincere	16	Nuke	13	G2 Esports
Natus Vincere	–	Cobblestone	–	G2 Esports
Ninjas in Pyjamas	10	Train	16	Cloud9
Ninjas in Pyjamas	16	Cache	11	Cloud9
Ninjas in Pyjamas	6	Cobblestone	16	Cloud9
FaZe Clan	16	Overpass	9	Team Liquid
FaZe Clan	16	Train	5	Team Liquid
FaZe Clan	–	Inferno	–	Team Liquid
OpTic Gaming	16	Mirage	10	SK Gaming
OpTic Gaming	9	Cache	16	SK Gaming
OpTic Gaming	7	Cobblestone	16	SK Gaming

=== Semifinals ===
Semifinals
Team	Score	Map	Score	Team
Natus Vincere	13	Mirage	16	Cloud9
Natus Vincere	14	Overpass	16	Cloud9
Natus Vincere	–	Train	–	Cloud9
FaZe Clan	4	Overpass	16	SK Gaming
FaZe Clan	16	Cache	19	SK Gaming
FaZe Clan	–	Inferno	–	SK Gaming

=== Finals ===
Finals
Team	Score	Map	Score	Team
Cloud9	9	Cobblestone	16	SK Gaming
Cloud9	12	Train	16	SK Gaming
Cloud9	14	Inferno	16	SK Gaming
Cloud9	–	Mirage	–	SK Gaming
Cloud9	–	Cache	–	SK Gaming

== Final standings ==
Each team's placing, team roster, coach, and prize distribution are shown below. Each team's in-game leader is shown first.

Place	Prize Money	Team	Roster	Coach
1st	US$100,000	SK Gaming	FalleN, coldzera, felps, fer, TACO	
2nd	US$50,000	Cloud9	Stewie2K, autimatic, n0thing, Skadoodle, shroud	valens
3rd–4th	US$22,000	FaZe Clan	karrigan, allu, kioShiMa, NiKo, rain	RobbaN
3rd–4th	US$22,000	Natus Vincere	seized, Edward, flamie, GuardiaN, s1mple	Andi
5–8th	$10,000	G2 Esports	shox, apEX, bodyy, kennyS, NBK-	SmithZz
5–8th	$10,000	Ninjas in Pyjamas	Xizt, draken, f0rest, GeT RiGhT, REZ	THREAT
5–8th	$10,000	OpTic Gaming	tarik, hazed, RUSH, NAF, mixwell	Adrig6
5–8th	$10,000	Team Liquid	stanislaw, jdm64, ELiGE, nitr0, Twistzz	zews
9–11th	$6,000	Fnatic	dennis, flusha, JW, KRiMZ, olofmeister	Jumpy
9–11th	$6,000	mousesports	chrisJ, denis, loWel, oskar, ropz	lmbt
9–11th	$6,000	North	MSL, aizy, cajunb, k0nfig, Magisk	ruggah
12–14th	$3,000	Heroic	Snappi, es3tag, JUGi, niko, MODDII	FeTiSh
12–14th	$3,000	Immortals	boltz, HEN1, kNgV-, LUCAS1, steel	zakk
12–14th	$3,000	Space Soldiers	MAJ3R, Calyx, ngiN, paz, XANTARES	hardstyle
15–16th	$1,500	TyLoo	Mo, DD, HZ, somebody, BnTeT	peacemaker
15–16th	$1,500	Virtus.pro	Snax, byali, NEO, pashaBiceps, TaZ	kuben
