= Counter-Strike in esports =

Counter-Strike
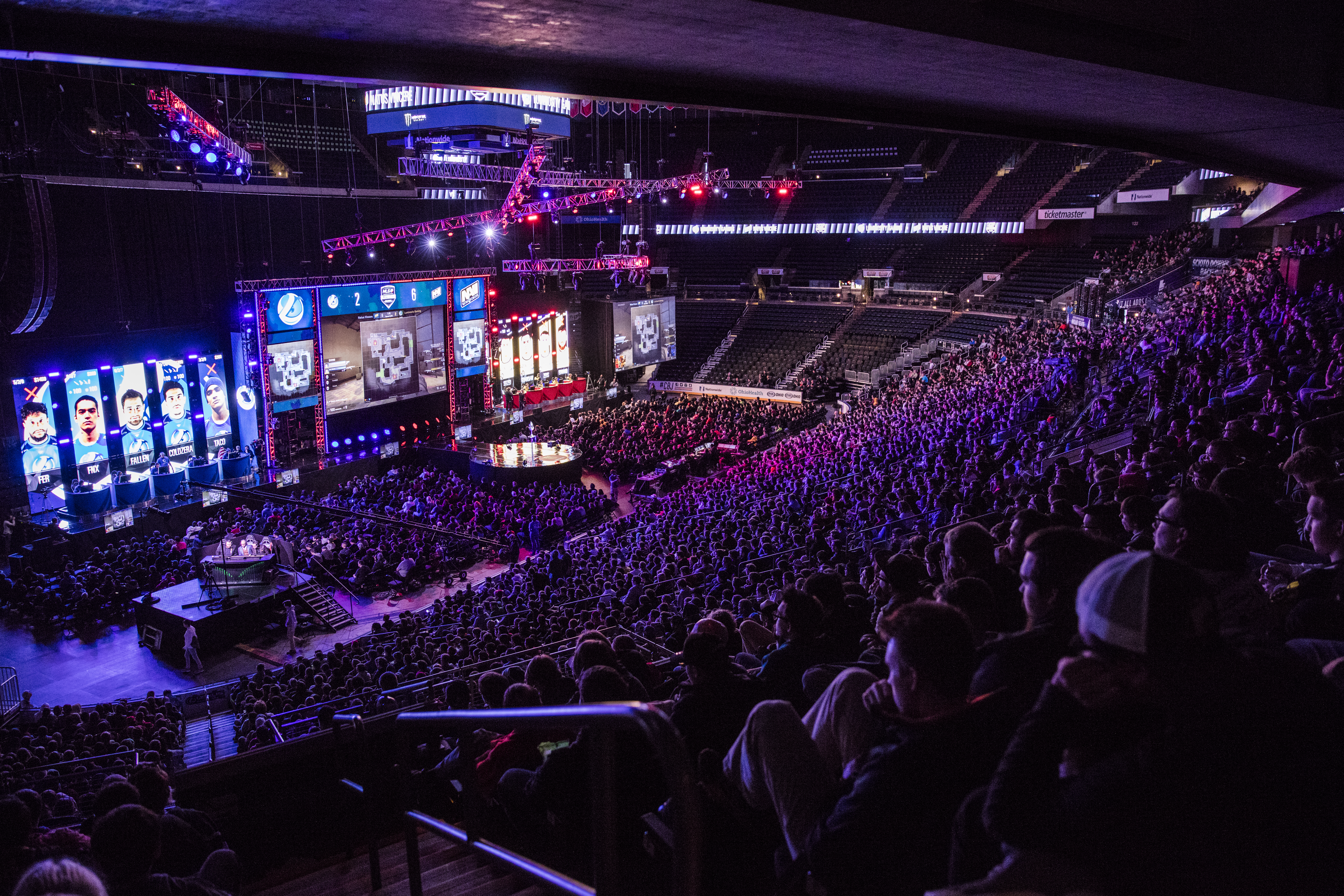
- Luminosity Gaming competing against Natus Vincere at the MLG Columbus 2016
- Highest governing body: Valve
- First played: 2000

Characteristics
- Type: Esports
- Equipment: Computer; mouse; keyboard; headphones

Professional Counter-Strike competition involves professional gamers competing in the first-person shooter game series Counter-Strike. The original game, released in 1999, is a mod developed by Minh "Gooseman" Le and Jess Cliffe of the 1998 video game Half-Life, published by Valve. Currently, the games that have been played competitively include Counter-Strike (CS also called CS 1.6), Counter-Strike: Condition Zero (CS:CZ), Counter-Strike: Source (CS:S), Counter-Strike: Global Offensive (CS:GO), and Counter-Strike 2 (CS2). Major esports championships began in 2001 with the Cyberathlete Professional League Winter Championship, won by Ninjas in Pyjamas.

== History ==
The Counter-Strike series has over 25 years of competitive history beginning with the original Counter-Strike. Tournaments for early versions of the game have been hosted since 2000, but the first prestigious international tournament was hosted in Dallas, Texas at the 2001 Cyberathlete Professional League (CPL) Winter Championship, won by the Swedish team Ninjas in Pyjamas. The tournament offered a $150,000 prize pool and became known as the first "Major". The final significant update to the original Counter-Strike game was version 1.6 in 2003, and so the game became known as Counter-Strike 1.6 (CS 1.6).

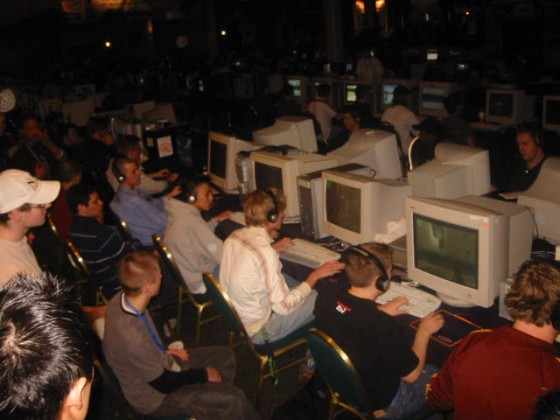
2001 Winter CPL Counter-Strike tournament

In 2002, the World Cyber Games became the next tournament to host competitive Counter-Strike, followed by the Electronic Sports World Cup in 2003. These, along with the bi-annual CPL tournaments, were the dominant Majors of CS 1.6 through 2007. CPL ceased operation in 2008, but another league, ESL, then added Counter-Strike to its Intel Extreme Masters (IEM) series. These tournaments continued for four years. The years of 2002-07 are considered Counter-Strike's first Golden Age, as the game's popularity and market-share eclipsed all others in the fledgling esports industry.

Valve struggled to iterate and evolve on CS 1.6 because of its high skill ceiling and gameplay. The Counter-Strike Xbox release had limited success as compared to that of Halo and Call of Duty. The first official sequel was Counter-Strike: Source (CS:S), released on October 7, 2004. The game was criticized by the competitive community, who believed the game's skill ceiling was significantly lower than that of CS 1.6. This caused a divide in the competitive community as to which game to play competitively. Valve, sponsors, and tournament organizers were advocating for the newer CS:S to be played at tournaments, but the large majority of professional CS players refused to play it due to its perceived shortcomings. Counter-Strike esports gradually decreased in popularity during the late 2000s and early 2010s. This was in part due to the fractured competitive scene, but also due to the newcomer MOBA genre overcoming Counter-Strike's previous stranglehold on the team-based esport market.

The release of Counter-Strike: Global Offensive (CS:GO) in 2012 reunited the competitive community of Counter-Strike, ushering in a new era of esports relevance for the franchise. Initially, the game was criticized for imbalanced gameplay, poor mechanics and bugs. However, within several months the gameplay improved after updates from Valve. The advent of video game streaming services such as UStream, Justin.tv and Twitch increased the popularity of competitive Counter-Strike. On September 16, 2013, Valve announced a US$250,000 community-funded prize pool for its first CS:GO Major Championship; the money was funded through the "Arms Deal" update, which created in-game cosmetics that players could purchase. Valve also announced that the first Major would take place in Sweden at DreamHack Winter 2013. The Valve-sponsored Majors would go on to be the most important and prestigious tournaments in the Global Offensive esports scene.

In October 2015, a number of professional esports organizations with Counter-Strike teams announced the formation of a trade union that set several demands for future tournament attendance. The announcement was a publicly posted email written by Alexander Kokhanovsky, CEO of Natus Vincere, that was sent to organizers of major esports events. Teams that were part of the union included Natus Vincere, Team Liquid, Counter Logic Gaming, Cloud9, Virtus.pro, Team SoloMid, Fnatic, Ninjas in Pyjamas, Titan and Team EnVyUs. Teams in this union would not attend Counter-Strike: Global Offensive tournaments with prize pools of less than $75,000. In 2016, the World Esports Association (WESA) was founded by ESL with many esports teams, including Fnatic, Natus Vincere, Team EnVyUs and FaZe Clan, though FaZe Clan left soon after the league's formation. In its announcement, WESA said it would "further professionalize eSports by introducing elements of player representation, standardized regulations, and revenue sharing for teams". They also planned to help fans and organizers by "seeking to create predictable schedules."

Valve's decisions have a strong influence on the competitive metagame. Decisions such as the removal of old maps and additions of new maps are often met with criticism, as well as changes made to certain weapons' performance characteristics. In 2016, Valve was "heavily criticized" for the removal of the map Inferno and its replacement, Nuke, in the competitive map pool. The release of CS 1.6 in 2003 saw a contentious nerf of the iconic AWP sniper rifle by increasing its draw time. This significantly reduced the ability of a player armed with an AWP to simultaneously engage multiple targets. The AWP was again the subject of a controversial nerf in 2015 when players' movement speed and acceleration was decreased while the weapon was equipped. Valve has also implemented new coaching rules restricting the ability of communication between coaches and players during a match, and altered a 15-year precedent by increasing the duration of each round and bomb timer in 2015.

By 2014, 25 million copies of the Counter-Strike series were sold. The game's fan base remains strong, having reached a new record of 1.4 million concurrent players in March 2023, surpassing the game's previous record of 1.3 million concurrent players in 2020 during the COVID-19 pandemic.

On November 12, 2023, Perfect World announced the second Counter-Strike 2 Major. Played from November 30 to December 15, 2024, in Shanghai, it marked the first Major in China.

== Tournament system ==
Counter-Strike tournaments can be hosted by any entity, and do not have a single official event organizer (like FIFA in football association, for example). The Major Championships, sponsored by Valve and held by different organizers twice a year, are the most prestigious tournaments, although they may not necessarily have the highest prizes. Most of the big teams compete, most of the time, in world tournaments that bring together teams from all corners of the world. Some of the most notable major tournaments are organized by ESL, such as the Intel Extreme Masters and ESL Pro League, and by Blast, such as the Blast Premier series. Tournaments that do not have a worldwide character are usually organized for teams of lower level, serving as qualifiers for the main tournaments.

Teams rankings are published by HLTV and ESL, who use various criteria to determine the best ranked teams from the most recent tournaments. Until 2025, these rankings were then used by some tournament organizers to directly invite teams, depending on their rank.

=== Valve tournament system (from 2025) ===
In 2023, Valve announced that starting in 2025, only the official Valve ranking system, known as the Valve Regional Standings (VRS), could be used to generate invitations, done to combat franchised systems like the ESL Pro Tour and BLAST Premier. The detailed system, unveiled in 2024, separates all non-Major tournaments into Tier 1, Tier 2, Wildcard and Unranked tournaments.

==== Tier 1 tournaments ====
Tier 1 tournaments are the highest ranking non-Major events, typically consisting of the best teams in the world with a high prize pool and have the most impact on the Valve rankings. The top 20 teams in the chosen Valve rankings (Global, Europe, Americas, Asia and/or subdivisions of Americas and Asia if applicable) are invited, with at least 8 teams participating in the main stage of the tournament, defined as the final stage where teams enter. For every 8 teams invited via the rankings, the organizer may invite two Wildcard teams in place of the bottom 2 invites; these are teams that made the finals of any tournament or have cores that previously were in Valve's top 12 in the past 6 months. Open qualifiers can also be used to fill spots if needed.

For example, IEM Katowice and Cologne invite the top 8 teams in the global Valve standings straight to the group stage (which is classified as its main stage), while the next 16 teams enter the play-in for the final 8 spots.

==== Tier 2 tournaments ====
Tier 2 tournaments are events with not as much status or prize money as their Tier 1 equivalents, and as such don't have the same impact on the Valve rankings. The top 12 teams in the chosen Valve rankings cannot be invited to these events, with all tournament organizers having to start from 13th in the rankings and work their way down; they can otherwise use filtered standings by region or forgo ranking invites and use entirely open qualifiers or signups. Unlike their higher counterparts, organizers can filter invites based on team nationality or gender, but not to the point where specific teams are invited. Tier 2 event finalists can be invited to Tier 1 or Tier 2 events as Wildcards for up to 6 months after their win, but Tier 1 finalists can't be invited to a Tier 2 event as Wildcards.

==== Wildcard tournaments ====
For every three events in either Tier 1 or Tier 2 that an organizer runs, they can organize a Wildcard tournament, which are considered a special type of event for that tier. A tournament organizer has to declare which tournaments are connected to the Wildcard tournament, but can otherwise invite however many Wildcards they want and have them enter the main stage of the tournament. These Wildcards have to match the makeup of the organizer's qualifying tournaments. As an example, a tournament organizer with two European Tier 1 tournaments and two global Tier 1 tournaments must have half of their Wildcards be European Wildcards, with the rest being Global Wildcards. Organizers may also use the Valve rankings to invite more teams or use open qualifiers.

==== Unranked tournaments ====
Unranked tournaments let tournament organizers invite whoever they want to the main tournament or closed qualifiers, but do not contribute to the Valve rankings. These tournaments are also limited by prize pool, as no one tournament can exceed $100,000 and a tournament organizer can't have their overall unranked circuit go over $250,000 in a calendar year.

== Media coverage ==
As the game and the scene grew in popularity, companies, including WME/IMG and Turner Broadcasting, began to televise Global Offensive professional games, with the first being ELEAGUE Major 2017, held at the Fox Theatre and broadcast on US cable television network TBS in 2016. On August 22, 2018, Turner announced its further programming of Global Offensive with ELeague's Esports 101: CSGO and ELEAGUE CS:GO Premier 2018 docuseries on TBS. In 2019 Danish television station TV 2 secured exclusive TV rights to broadcast ESL Pro League and Dreamhack's ESL Pro Tour in Danish. In 2023 TV 2 announced it would no longer broadcast Counter-Strike from 2024 onwards citing a lack of commercial sustainability given free alternatives, such as Twitch, and the downturn in results from the Danish superteam Astralis leading to a decline in popularity within Denmark.

== Controversies ==
=== Cheating ===
Cheating, particularly through the use of software hacks on online servers, has been a problem throughout the history of Counter-Strike and generally results in a game ban if discovered. A Valve Anti-Cheat (VAC) ban is the most common way in which players are banned. VAC is a system designed by Valve to detect cheats on computers. Any time a player connects to a VAC-secured server and a cheat is detected, the user is kicked from the server, given a permanent lifetime ban and barred from playing on any VAC-secured servers. Professional players play online on independent platform servers hosted by leagues such as ESEA or Faceit, which have proprietary anti-cheat programs.

Linus "b0bbzki" Lundqvist was the first known professional player to be banned in Global Offensive. Hovik "KQLY" Tovmassian was one of the highest-profile players to be issued a VAC ban. KQLY was banned, along with several other professional players, such as Gordon "Sf" Giry, while KQLY was playing for France's best team, Titan. Vinicius “v$m” Moreira from Brazil was VAC-banned while he was playing for Detona Gaming.

Cheating has also occurred at LAN tournaments, and players who cheat at organized tournaments may receive permanent bans or may be dismissed from their team. In 2018, at the eXTREMESLAND ZOWIE Asia CS:GO, Nikhil "forsaken" Kumawat of OpTic India was caught cheating mid-match using aimbot during a tournament game against Revolution, a Vietnamese Counter-Strike: Global Offensive team. The tournament had a $100,000 prize pool. OpTic India was disqualified and Kumawat was dismissed from the team.

In 2020, the Esports Integrity Commission (ESIC) banned over 37 coaches due to abuse of a spectator mode bug. Valve also has punished these coaches from a number of CS:GO Majors with the severity dependant on the number of times the bug was abused.

On 15 April 2021, Valve updated event guidelines to allow players with VAC banned accounts to compete again in Valve sponsored events. The updated rules state: A VAC ban will only disqualify a player from an event if it was either received fewer than 5 years prior, or if it was received at any time after their first participation in a Valve-sponsored event.

=== Match fixing ===
Players have also been banned for match fixing. In August 2014, two CS:GO teams, iBUYPOWER and NetcodeGuides.com, were involved in a match-fixing scandal that has been cited as "the first large match fixing scandal" in the CS:GO community. iBUYPOWER, who was heavily favored to win, lost in a resounding 16-to-4 defeat to NetcodeGuides.com. It was later discovered in a tip to Dot Esports that the match was fixed.

On 20 January 2021, the ESIC issued sanctions against 35 players for betting-related offences primarily in the Australian CS:GO scene.

On 31 March 2021, ESIC Commissioner Ian Smith revealed that the Federal Bureau of Investigation (FBI) was now involved in the ongoing investigation into match-fixing in North American Counter-Strike, which has been underway since September 2020. ESIC is collaborating with federal law enforcement as part of a larger investigation into players bribed to fix matches by outside "betting syndicates".

In May 2025, multiple players and staff from ATOX Esports' Counter-Strike 2 team were banned for match-fixing. ESIC investigated suspicious betting patterns during lower-tier matches, uncovering evidence of coordinated manipulation. Those involved received multi-year suspensions.

=== Gambling ===
Following the introduction of weapon skins into Global Offensive with the Arms Deal update in August 2013, a virtual economy formed around the skins based on rarity and desirability. Because of this, a number of skin-trading and gambling sites using the Steamworks API were created. Initially, these sites focused on wagering skins on the outcomes of professional and semi-professional CS:GO matches, in the vein of sports betting. However, some of these sites began to offer casino gambling functionality in 2015, allowing users to gamble their skins on the outcome of roulette spins, coin flips, dice rolls, and other games of chance. According to research firm Eilers & Krejcik Gaming, players and esports fans wagered $2.3 billion in 2015, and $5 billion in 2016 on CS:GO skins. In June and July of that year, two lawsuits were filed against specific gambling sites and Valve, arguing that Valve allowed their skins to be used for illegal underage gambling. Valve began to take steps to prevent these sites from using Steamworks for gambling purposes, and several of the sites ceased operating as a result. In July 2018, Valve disabled the opening of containers in Belgium and the Netherlands after the in-game loot boxes appeared to violate Dutch and Belgian gambling laws. However, some parties have tried to contest Valve's gambling rules.

== See also ==
- List of competitive Counter-Strike maps
- Counter-Strike coaching bug scandal
