= Cheating in esports =

Cheating in esports is a deliberate violation of the rules of an esports governing body or other behavior that is intended to give an unfair advantage to a player or team. At its core, esports are video game competitions in an organized, competitive environment. Tournaments often pay out prize money to the highest placing teams in these events, giving players an incentive to cheat. Commonly cited instances of cheating include the use of software cheats, such as aimbots and wallhacks, exploitation of bugs, use of performance-enhancing drugs, such as Ritalin and Adderall, and match fixing.

Unlike traditional sports, esports may not be recognized as official sports in many countries, leading to a lack of standardized regulations. Additionally, video game developers and individual tournament organizers may have differing approaches to enforcement, leading to inconsistencies in handling cheating incidents. Several global governing bodies, such as the Esports Integrity Commission, have made efforts to establish and enforce integrity policies, but they have largely been unsuccessful.

== Background ==
Esports involve professional teams competing in organized, competitive video games. Similar to traditional sports, these professional esports players are often signed by esports organizations to participate in leagues and tournaments. Various video game genres are associated with esports, including first-person shooters, multiplayer online battle arenas (MOBAs), and sports video games. Some esports events attract millions of viewers, with fans having the option to watch live broadcasts on platforms like Twitch and ESPN, or attend the events in person at arenas. Substantial prize money is awarded to the top-performing teams in these tournaments. For instance, in 2021, Dota 2's The International featured a prize pool exceeding US$47 million. Given the potential for significant financial gain, players may be tempted to resort to cheating.

== Esports specific regulation ==
In contrast to traditional major league sports like FIFA for association football and NFL for American football, esports lacks centralization under a single governing body. Unlike these sports leagues, which are self-regulated and guided by established statutes, case law, and national or state regulations, esports operates with a considerable degree of autonomy. The absence of widespread recognition of esports as an official sport in many countries poses challenges for implementing comprehensive regulation. Consequently, the responsibility of rule-setting in esports tournaments usually falls to the individual organizers, with their guidelines subject to approval from the respective video game developers.

Esports competitions are regulated by two main types of entities: game-neutral and game-specific organizations. The game-neutral entities, such as the World Esports Association (WESA), the Esports Integrity Commission (ESIC), the International Esports Federation (IESF), and the Electronic Sports League (ESL), are responsible for enforcing policies across various esports titles. Despite their efforts to regulate the esports industry, they have faced challenges in achieving comprehensive success. As of 2019, ESIC emerged as the leading regulatory body, dedicated to enforcing ethical standards in esports. However, it is not universally adopted, as participation in ESIC is optional for leagues and organizations. ESIC considers software cheats, online attacks, match-fixing, and doping as the most significant forms of cheating. On the other hand, game-specific entities focus solely on a single esports title and are typically controlled by the respective game's publisher. Prominent examples of such entities include the Overwatch League, the League of Legends Championship Series, and the Call of Duty League.

== Types of cheating ==
Cheating in esports can be broadly categorized into two types: cheating to win and cheating to lose. Cheating to win involves attempting to gain an unfair advantage over opponents through illegitimate means. Common forms include using software cheats, online attacks, and doping. Cheating to lose refers to intentionally underperforming or losing a match, usually for financial gain. It can be achieved through actions like match fixing, corrupting officials, spot-fixing, and manipulating tournament structures.

=== Cheating to win ===
==== Software cheats ====
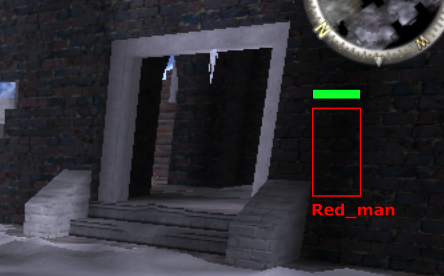
Wallhacks allow players to see the position of their opponent without having to be in line of sight of them.

One prevalent form of cheating in esports involves the use of unauthorized software, commonly known as software cheats. These cheats provide players with an unfair advantage over their opponents, compromising the integrity of the competition. One notable type of software cheat is the aimbot, a program designed to automatically target opponents with superior speed and accuracy compared to human capabilities. Esports servers commonly employ built-in anti-cheat software to detect and prevent the use of these illicit practices. However, some sophisticated cheats may still evade detection.

An illustrative example of a player utilizing software assistance is the case of Counter-Strike (CS) player XektoR. During German ESL Pro Series online matches in 2008, XektoR exhibited exceptional performance. However, during in-person events, his gameplay performance significantly declined. Upon reviewing replay data analytics, ESL members discovered evidence of XektoR using an aimbot and wallhacks during the online matches, resulting in a two-year ban for the player. Following this ban, XektoR's team took ESL to the District Court of Cologne. While the court did not make a statement on whether XektoR cheated or not, they deemed the measures taken by ESL as appropriate.

Software cheats are not limited to online play alone. In another instance, during the Extremesland Zowie Asia CS:GO 2018 tournament in Shanghai, player Nikhil "Forsaken" Kumawat was caught using an aimbot. As the tournament administrator approached Forsaken to examine his computer, he attempted to dismiss the administrator and quickly delete the hack to avoid detection. As a result, his team, OpTic India, was disqualified from the event, and the team disbanded entirely. After a comprehensive review of Kumawat's play from a previous tournament, the India Premiership Fall Finals, ESL India found conclusive evidence of cheating in both events, leading to a five-year ban by ESIC.

==== Hardware cheats ====
Tournament organizers often impose restrictions on the type of hardware that players are allowed to use during esports events. While many tournaments permit players to bring their own mouse and keyboard, this allowance creates the potential for unauthorized equipment to be used.

For instance, during Dota 2's event The International 2018, the Peruvian team Thunder Predator faced disqualification after it was discovered that one of their players, Atún, had programmed macro commands into his mouse during a qualifying match on June 19, 2018. The tournament organizer, FACEIT, deemed the use of a programmable mouse equivalent to running a software script, leading to the disqualification of Thunder Predator from the competition.

Hardware cheats extend beyond mice and keyboards. In another incident involving CS:GO, a player known as Ra1f was caught using a hardware cheat in 2018. Ra1f used a technique that involved connecting a second computer to his main computer, bypassing the anti-cheat technology employed by the ESEA league. This hardware cheat allowed him to gain an unfair advantage by revealing the positions of all his opponents during matches.

==== Bug exploitation ====
Software bugs are an unavoidable occurrence in most video games. Some individuals or teams may exploit these bugs to gain an unfair advantage over their opponents. While most esports integrity policies strictly prohibit intentional bug exploitation, the unintentional use of a bug may be tolerated under certain circumstances.

CS:GO has witnessed several instances of intentional bug abuse. For example, in a match at DreamHack Winter 2014, team Fnatic exploited bugs that enabled them to stand on invisible ledges, see through solid objects, and even become invulnerable to damage. As the latter two exploits were in direct violation of the tournament organizer's rules, Fnatic's actions resulted in the match being forced to replay. However, the team ultimately decided to forfeit instead. Similarly, during the PGL Major: Kraków 2017, team BIG utilized a bug that allowed them to peek their heads over a wall without revealing their position on the other side. Although BIG was not penalized by the tournament organizers, the exploit's legitimacy sparked controversy over its sportsmanship. After the match, the remaining teams in the tournament agreed to a gentleman's agreement to refrain from exploiting the bug in future matches.

Bug exploits are typically executed by players, but one of the most significant bug abuse scandals in esports was the Counter-Strike coaching bug scandal. In August 2020, ESL banned three coaches who had taken advantage of a bug that allowed them to see parts of the map they should not have had access to during matches. Following further investigations, the ESIC imposed sanctions on 37 coaches in September, resulting in bans ranging from five to 36 months. In May 2022, ESIC issued nearly 100 new sanctions, further penalizing individuals involved in the spectator bug exploitation scandal.

==== Doping ====
Similar to doping in traditional sports, the use of performance-enhancing drugs (PEDs) has become a concerning issue in esports, particularly involving nootropics such as Ritalin and Adderall. Some countries have regulations that restrict the use of PEDs. The United States Anti-Doping Agency (USADA), in compliance with the World Anti-Doping Code (WADA), maintains a list of restricted substances that includes Ritalin, but as of 2019, Adderall was not on the list. India's National Anti-Doping Agency (NADA) adheres to the same restricted list as WADA. However, it remains uncertain whether the regulations of USADA or NADA are directly applicable to esports athletes.

In 2015, the issue of Adderall use in the professional CS:GO scene came to light when Kory "Semphis" Friesen, a professional CS:GO player, openly acknowledged that nearly all players were using the drug. In response, the ESL implemented anti-doping policies similar to those in cycling and the Olympics by August 2015. However, questions have been raised regarding the effectiveness of these regulations since certain PEDs, like Adderall, may not remain detectable in a player's system for an extended period. In 2016, ESL reported no players testing positive for PEDs, but doubts persist about whether the policies truly deter such practices. A 2020 investigation by the Washington Post revealed that the use of Adderall had been an "open secret in the esports community for years". Despite this knowledge, many leagues neither conduct drug testing nor explicitly prohibit the use of such drugs in esports competitions.

==== Ghosting ====
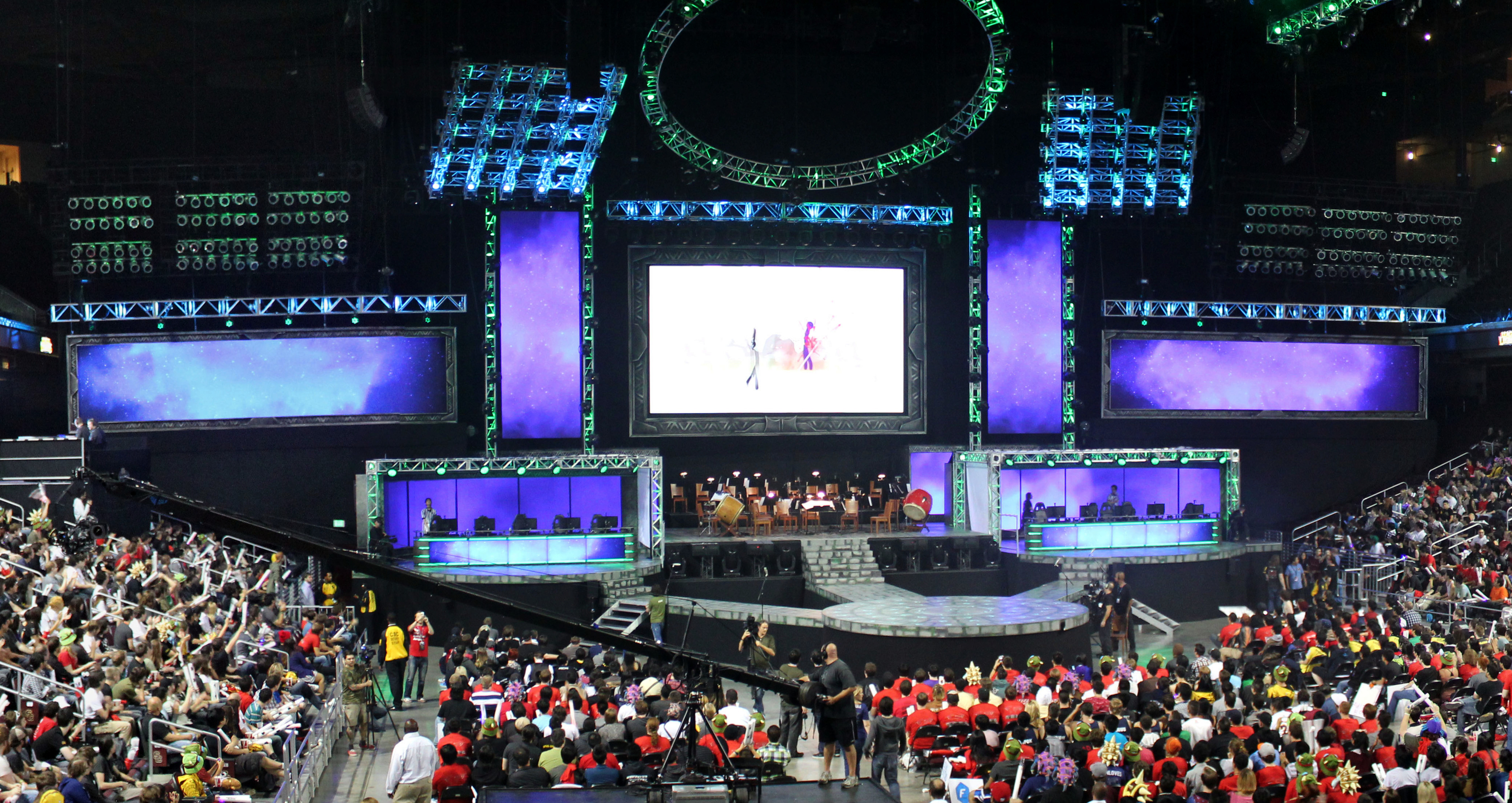
Stage setup at the Galen Center for the 2012 League of Legends World championship

Ghosting refers to the act of a player or team obtaining external information during a match from sources outside of the official game environment, such as stream viewers or the live audience. One notable incident of ghosting took place during a match between Azubu Frost and Team SoloMid at the 2012 League of Legends World Championship. In the midst of the match, a player from Frost appeared to glance at the spectator screens, enabling him to gain insight into the positions of his opponents. Riot Games investigated the incident and decided to uphold the match's outcome, stating that the incident did not significantly impact the game's result. However, they imposed a $30,000 fine on Azubu Frost for the infraction. Furthermore, Riot examined four other instances of potential screen watching during the World Championship and determined that none of them affected match outcomes.

Another notable occurrence of ghosting transpired at the 2019 Fortnite World Cup Finals. During the event, player Mark "Letw1k3" Danilov was observed looking at the spectator screen, which was strictly forbidden by the World Cup rules. Danilov received multiple warnings before eventually being disqualified and removed from the match.

==== Online attacks ====
While some esports events are held in live stadiums with an audience, numerous qualifying matches and knockout stages take place online. During these online competitions, players and teams may encounter online attacks, commonly known as distributed denial of service (DDoS) attacks. In such attacks, the perpetrator directs a massive influx of traffic to disrupt a player's internet connection, leading to significant lag that renders the game unplayable for the affected player.

One notable incident took place in 2015 during a League of Legends European Challenger Series match between Denial Esports and Dignitas. A player from Denial experienced a DDoS attack during the match, which forced the team to pause the game. Despite the player's efforts to relocate to different locations to resume the match, they were repeatedly targeted with DDoS attacks, making it impossible to continue. Consequently, Denial Esports had to forfeit the match after surpassing the maximum pause duration of ten minutes.

=== Cheating to lose ===
==== Match fixing ====
Match fixing in esports shares similarities with match fixing in traditional sports and occurs when a team or player intentionally underperforms or loses a match to gain illicit profits, often through betting fraud. This practice is commonly associated with gambling and betting markets. In the United States, several laws and statutes exist to penalize bribery, gambling, and match fixing in traditional sports, such as the Wire Act of 1961 and the Sports Bribery Act of 1964. However, the application of these acts to esports remains uncertain, as the recognition of esports as a sport in the traditional sense varies among different jurisdictions.

The first major incident of match fixing in esports occurred in 2010 when the Korea e-Sports Association (KeSPA), an organization managing esports in South Korea, permanently banned 11 StarCraft players and imposed fines after finding them guilty of match fixing. Some of the players involved also faced legal consequences and were sentenced to jail. Another StarCraft match-fixing scandal emerged in 2016, where StarCraft II World Champion Lee "Life" Seung-hyun admitted to receiving approximately $62,000 to deliberately lose two matches in May 2015. As a consequence, he received a lifetime ban from KeSPA and faced imprisonment. One of the largest match fixing scandals in esports occurred when South Korean authorities arrested 12 individuals, including three players, involved in five fixed StarCraft II matches in October 2015.

The Counter-Strike match fixing scandal in 2015 involving iBUYPOWER and NetCodeGuides was one of the most notable instances in esports. It was revealed that iBUYPOWER deliberately lost a match against NetCodeGuides in August 2014. As a result, seven players were banned from participating in future Valve-sponsored events.

==== Spot fixing ====
Spot fixing is a form of match manipulation similar to match fixing, but instead of fixing the outcome of an entire match, it involves manipulating specific parts or moments of the game. This is often done in coordination with proposition bet or specific in-game events that can be targeted for illicit gains. In May 2022, allegations of spot fixing emerged against the CS:GO team PARTY regarding a match that took place during the StarLadder Regional Minor Championship CIS closed qualifier in 2015.

==== Structural tournament manipulation ====
Structural tournament manipulation is a form of cheating in esports where teams deliberately underperform or manipulate their performance to take advantage of the specific structure or format of a tournament. The goal is to strategically position themselves for a more favorable outcome in subsequent stages of the competition. This type of cheating is relatively uncommon in esports, but one notable occurrence of structural tournament manipulation took place during the Counter-Strike match fixing scandal in 2014 involving the teams iBUYPOWER and NetCodeGuides.

== See also ==
- Cheating in video games
- Cheating in online games
