= Professional Esports Association =

American former esports league

- Game: Esports
- Founded: September 2016; 10 years ago
- Folded: May 2017; 9 years ago
- Commissioner: Jason Katz (2016–2017)
- No. of teams: 9
- Continent: North America
- Website: www.proesports.org (archived)

Professional Esports Association (PEA) is an American association of nine North American esports organizations. It was founded in 2016 as a member-owned esports league by seven American esports teams. Jason Katz was the league's commissioner from its founding until his departure in February 2017.

The association was created with the aim of having a "stable, healthy, long-term environment for the players". It planned to institute an equal profit sharing system between players and owners, instead of relying on the traditional prize pool system. The PEA's first planned competition was a Counter-Strike: Global Offensive (CS:GO) league, which was scheduled to begin in January 2017 with a minimum $1 million prize pool.

In December 2016, a decision by the PEA to disallow players from competing in the ESL Pro League was met with opposition from players, leading them to issue an open letter protesting the decision. In response to the letter, the PEA held a vote on the issue, which ended with players voting to play in the ESL Pro League. As a result, the association suspended its plans for a CS:GO league, four months after its inception. In May 2017, the PEA announced that it would be shifting its focus from hosting esports leagues to "[contributing] towards a productive and profitable North American esports ecosystem".

== History ==
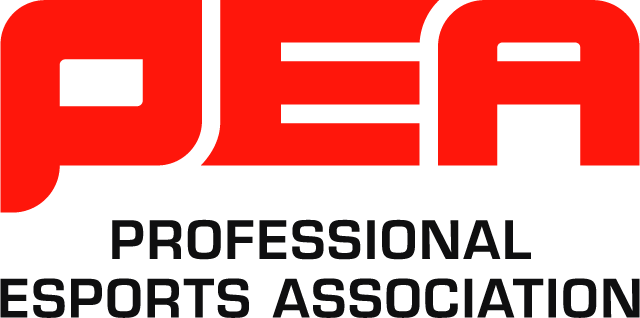
PEA Logo at launch

The Professional Esports Association was founded in September 2016, with Team SoloMid (TSM), Cloud9, Team Liquid, Counter Logic Gaming, Immortals, NRG Esports, and compLexity Gaming as founding members. The announcement followed the founding of the World Esports Association (WESA), which included many European esports teams, by ESL. In its founding announcement, the PEA described itself as an "Owner-Operated league aiming to be the NBA of eSport" by instituting an equal 50-percent profit share between owners and players, while also providing insurance and retirement benefits for players. It also promised players "a strong voice in every major league decision", through player representation in a Rules and a Grievances Committee. The league's founding commissioner was Jason Katz, who was previously the COO of Azubu, an esports streaming website. Katz also served as the vice president of global marketing for the Championship Gaming Series, a televised esports league that folded in 2008.

The PEA's first planned competition was a Counter-Strike: Global Offensive (CS:GO) league, originally scheduled to begin in January 2017 with a minimum $1 million prize pool in its first year. The inaugural season was to be held over ten weeks, with two matches per week and a $500,000 prize pool.

=== Player open letter ===
In December 2016, shortly after the league's inception, 25 of its 35 member players signed an open letter expressing frustration towards the league ownership's lack of communication and its decision to disallow PEA players from competing in the ESL Pro League. According to the letter written by player representative Scott "SirScoots" Smith, the players were told that the owners had the contractual right to determine where they play, which "came as a shock", given previous indications by the league and its owners granting that decision to the players. The letter also alleged that players were being disenfranchised by the ownership, as players were only allotted three of seven votes on the PEA Rules Committee, while the rest belonged to the team owners and the league itself. According to Smith, the players were told by league commissioner Jason Katz that the uneven structure was designed to avoid stalemates, and that the two votes belonging to the PEA should be considered "unbiased".

==== Firing of sgares ====
After the letter's release, TSM player Sean "sgares" Gares published a conversation between him and TSM owner Andy Dinh in which Dinh expressed his intention to replace Gares over his lack of communication with Dinh before the letter was published. In a subsequent statement, Dinh accused Gares of "mis[leading] and manipulat[ing]" other TSM players into signing a letter they "had not read and did not understand". Gares denied the accusations of manipulation, saying he spoke with Dinh about the players' concerns before the letter's publication. The other four players on TSM also denied being manipulated by Gares, saying in a statement that "some of us may have had more information than others or been more involved in this endeavor, but we all understood what we were doing when we gave the okay to put our names on the letter". TSM's CS:GO roster ultimately disbanded in January 2017, with the organization citing its deteriorating relationship with its remaining players and the latter's desire to continue playing with Gares. A day after the split, Gares and the rest of the former TSM CS:GO roster were signed by Misfits Gaming.

==== PEA response ====
The PEA responded with its own letter, stating that while it was not an exclusive league, it disputed the financial viability of players participating in both leagues due to the PEA's revenue-sharing model and "issues with over-saturation". According to the association, it had attempted a deal with WESA to resolve the oversaturation issue, but was declined. WESA in turn said it had "politely declined" an offer from the PEA that amounted to "terminating the [North American] division of the ESL Pro League".

The letter also reaffirmed the league's "contractual right to decide where their players compete" but offered to arrange a meeting for players to decide whether to compete in the ESL Pro League or the PEA league in the upcoming season.

=== League suspension and subsequent activities ===
In January 2017, PEA member players voted to compete in the ESL Pro League rather than the upcoming inaugural PEA season. This prompted the PEA to suspend its CS:GO league, with the organization also citing "[in]sufficient financial support in the ecosystem, ... to profitably operate a third prominent online league, due to the oversaturation of the marketplace and the recent upward spiral in operating costs". On February 17, 2017, the PEA announced Katz's departure from his position as part of a "reorganisation of its management structure", in which its Board of Governors would take over management duties in the interim.

After suspending its CS:GO league, the PEA added Team Dignitas and Misfits Gaming to its membership in May 2017. It also announced its intention to change its focus from operating esports leagues to "[contributing] towards a productive and profitable North American esports ecosystem". The PEA was reportedly still active in early 2018; in an interview, PEA spokesperson and NRG Esports co-owner Andy Miller stated that the group was still active behind-the-scenes and "focusing on bringing our marketing and fanbase, which is mainly North American, to brands and publishers". Miller also said that while the PEA no longer had any plans to launch their own esports league, they were in discussions with "a number of publishers about helping them launch their esports leagues".

== Membership ==
As of July 2019, the association had nine member organizations.

- Cloud9
- Complexity Gaming
- Counter Logic Gaming
- Dignitas
- Immortals
- Misfits Gaming
- NRG Esports
- Team Liquid
- Team SoloMid
