= International Games and Esports Tribunal =

The International Games and Esports Tribunal (IGET) is a not-for-profit dispute resolution body designed to provide arbitration and mediation for stakeholders in gaming and esports. It was launched by joint initiative by the Esports Integrity Commission (ESIC) and the World Intellectual Property Organization Arbitration and Mediation Center (WIPO AMC) in 2025.

== Background ==
The industry of esports have had an accelerated growth since 2019, partly as a result of COVID-19 pandemic. Since then, esports market has become a multibillion-dollar business with high demand. In 2025 the value of the global esports market was calculated in USD 8.11 billion, while the number of users is expected to reach 896 million by 2029.

The growing popularity of esports led to an increase in the number and complexity of disputes related to intellectual property rights, player contracts, minor-aged exploitation, sponsorship deals, and allegations of cheating and unfair practices.

Besides, several high-profile cases also exposed the lack of regulation of legal practices in esports, including the 2019 lawsuit filed by Fortnite player Turner "Tfue" Tenney against his organization, FaZe Clan, which became a landmark case in drawing attention to contractual practices unfavorable to professional players. Another example was the controversy over the potentially exploitative contract between South Korean player Seo “Kanavi” Jin-hyeok and Griffin, then a rising LCK team, that was uncovered by an investigation by League of Legends publisher Riot Games and the Korean e-Sports Association (KeSPA) in 2019.

Before the creation of the IGET, esports stakeholders counted with a limited number of instances of resolution of disputes like the Arbitration Court for E-sports (ACE) created by World Esports Association (WESA) and the Court of Arbitration for Sport (CAS) in Lausanne, that is not specialized in esports and have not recognised jurisdiction over them. WIPO and ESIC offered mediations for esports separately but with narrow capacities and specialization, the first focused on copyright infringement, trademark licensing, and unauthorised use of intellectual property; and the second focused on integrity issues such as cheating, match-fixing and doping.

Also in 2019, the World Intellectual Property Organization Arbitration and Mediation Center (WIPO AMC) conducted a global survey on digital copyright and content disputes. The study collected more than 1,000 responses from 129 countries and revealed a notable increase in the number and complexity of disputes involving online platforms, social media, and, in particular, the video game industry.

Following the results of the 2019 survey WIPO AMC started conversations with major video game publishers, and in 2021 they started discussing the idea of having a one-stop shop dispute resolution mechanism in esports. Later, WIPO AMC contacted the Esports Integrity Commission (ESIC). Both organizations agreed in combine ESIC's integrity expertise with WIPO's authority in intellectual property dispute resolution. From this collaboration the International Games and Esports Tribunal (IGET) was created and launched in January 2025, as an industry-specific arbitration and mediation platform, tailored for esports.

On August 2025, ESL FACEIT Group signed a memorandum of understanding with the IGET to use its services of mediation and arbitration, becoming the first esports tournament organiser that collaborates with the tribunal.
