= Cheating =

Action to subvert rules

Cheating generally describes various actions designed to subvert or disobey rules in order to obtain unfair advantages without being noticed. This includes acts of bribery, cronyism and nepotism in any situation where individuals are given preference using inappropriate criteria. The rules infringed may be explicit, or they may be from an unwritten code of conduct based on morality, ethics or custom, making the identification of cheating conduct a potentially subjective process. Cheating can refer specifically to infidelity, where arranged or consensual relationships, that often come with a social contract, are violated. Someone who is known for cheating is referred to as a cheat in British English, and a cheater in American English.

== Academic ==
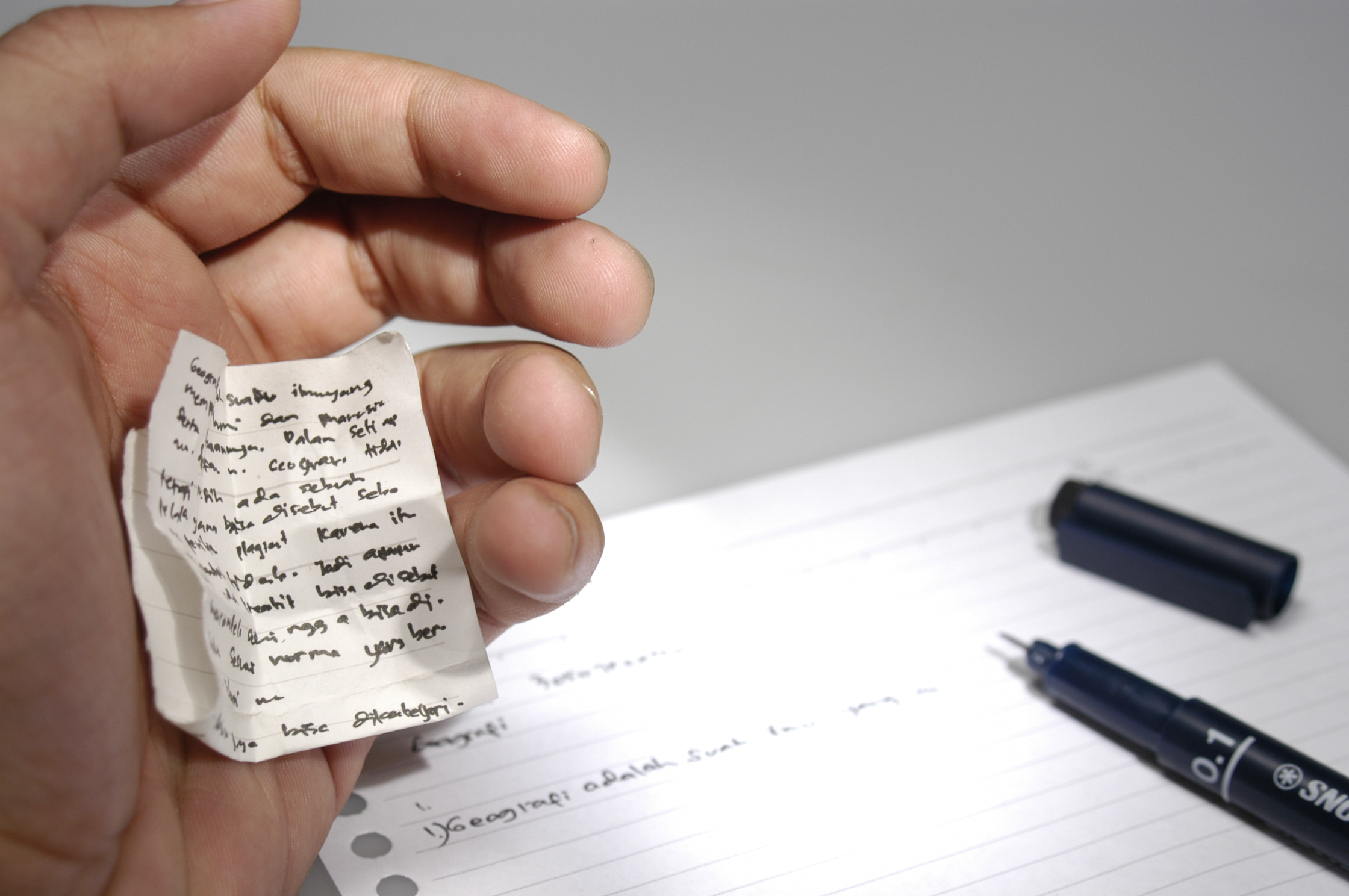
A small cheat sheet can be used to cheat during an academic examination.

Academic cheating is a significantly common occurrence in high schools and colleges in the United States. Statistically, 64% of public high school students admit to serious test cheating. 58% say they have plagiarized. 95% of students admit to some form of cheating. This includes tests, examinations, copying homework, and papers. Only 50% of private school students, however, admit to this. The report was made in June 2005 by Rutgers University professor Donald McCabe for The Center for Academic Integrity. The findings were corroborated in part by a Gallup survey. In McCabe's 2,001 of 4,500 high school students, "74% said they cheated on a test, 72% cheated on a written work, and 97% reported to at least had copied someone's homework or peeked at someone's test. 1/3 reported to have repeatedly cheated." The new revolution in high-tech digital info contributes enormously to the new wave in cheating: online term-paper mills sell formatted reports on practically any topic, services exist to prepare any kind of homework or take online tests for students (despite the fact that this phenomenon, and these websites, are well known to educators), digital audio players can contain notes, and graphing calculators store formulas to solve math problems. The Ming-dynasty Book of Swindles discusses cases of cheating and bribery surrounding the Chinese imperial examination for civil service.

== Sport, games and gambling ==
=== Sports ===
Cheating in sports is the intentional breaking of rules in order to obtain an advantage over the other teams or players. Sports are governed by both customs and explicit rules regarding acts which are permitted and forbidden at the event and away from it. Forbidden acts frequently include performance-enhancing drug taking (known as "doping"), using equipment that does not conform to the rules or altering the condition of equipment during play, and deliberate harassment or injury to competitors.

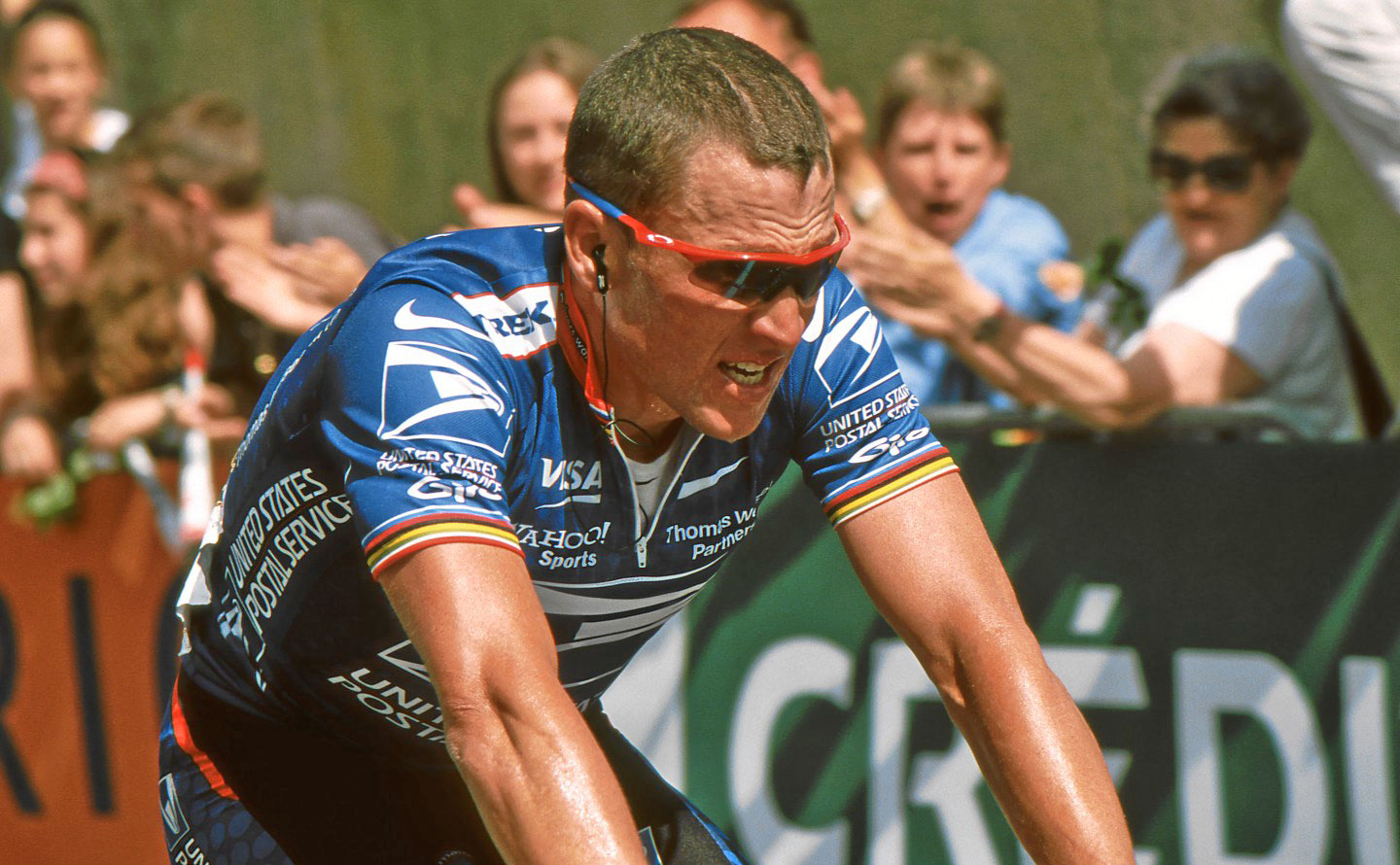
A 2012 investigation by the United States Anti-Doping Agency (USADA) found that Lance Armstrong had used banned performance-enhancing drugs over the course of his cycling career.

High-profile examples of alleged doping cheating include Lance Armstrong's use of steroids in professional road cycling – particularly controversial as it is widely suspected that a high percentage of professional cyclists are using prohibited substances – Ben Johnson's disqualification following the 100 metres final at the 1988 Summer Olympics, and admissions of steroid use by former professional baseball players after they have retired, such as José Canseco and Ken Caminiti. A famous sporting scandal involving cheating via harassment and injury occurred in 1994 in figure skating when Tonya Harding's ex-husband, Jeff Gillooly, and her bodyguard Shawn Eckhardt, hired Shane Stant to break Nancy Kerrigan's leg to remove her from the year's competitions and prevent her from competing with Harding. One of the most famous instances of cheating involving a prohibited player action occurred during the 1986 FIFA World Cup quarter-final, when Diego Maradona used his hand to punch the ball into the goal of England goalkeeper Peter Shilton. Using the hand or arm by anyone other than a goalkeeper is illegal according to the rules of association football.

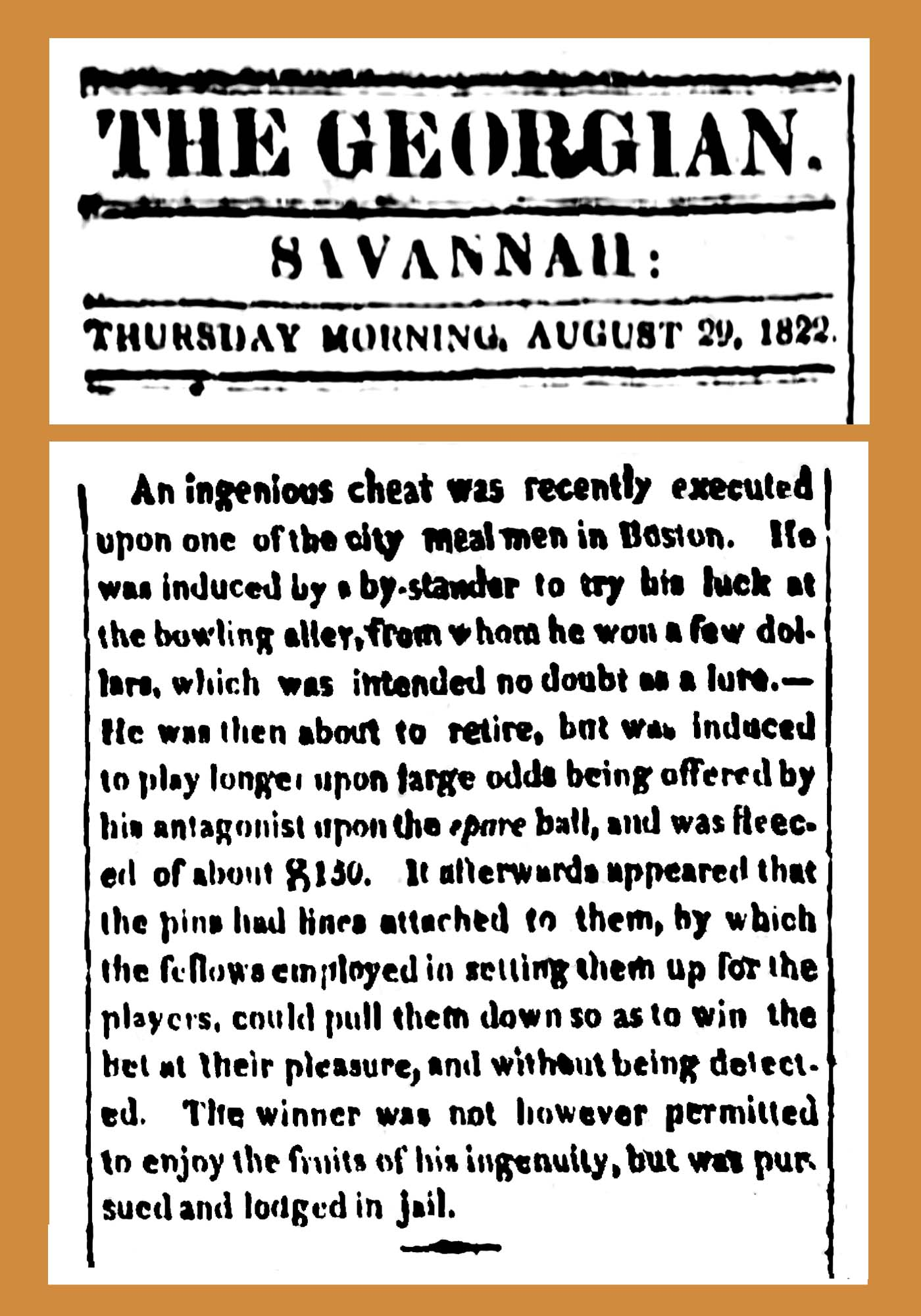
This 1822 newspaper describes how strings, secretly attached to bowling pins, allow an accomplice to ensure a cheater receives higher bowling scores.

Illegally altering the condition of playing equipment is frequently seen in bat sports such as baseball and cricket, which are heavily dependent on equipment condition. For example, in baseball, a pitcher using a doctored baseball, such as a spitball or an emery ball, or a batter using a corked bat are some examples of this. Tennis and golf are also subject to equipment cheating, with players being accused of using rackets of illegal string tension, or golf clubs of illegal weight, size, or make. Equipment cheating can also occur via the use of external aids in situations where equipment is prohibited – such as in American football via the use of stickum on the hands of receivers, making the ball easier to catch. An example of this is Hall of Famer Jerry Rice, who admitted to regularly and illegally using "stickum" throughout his career, calling into question the integrity of his receiving records.

Athletic cheating is a widespread problem. For example, in professional bodybuilding, cheating is now estimated to be so universal that it is now considered impossible to engage in professional competition without cheating and the use of supposedly banned substances; bodybuilders who refuse to take banned substances now compete in natural bodybuilding leagues.

Cheating may also be seen in coaching. One of the most common forms of this is the use of bribery and kickbacks in the player recruitment process. Such practices are widespread all across athletics, and are particularly visible in college sports recruitment. Another common form of cheating in coaching is profiteering in association with gamblers and match fixing. The most famous coach of the University of Nevada, Las Vegas Runnin' Rebels basketball team, Jerry Tarkanian, was accused of both recruitment fraud and gambling fraud over the course of his career and was the subject of intense NCAA scrutiny. Another form of this involves a team coach or other manager undertaking corporate espionage or another form of prohibited spying in order to obtain details about other teams' strategies and tactics. The 2007 New England Patriots videotaping controversy is an example of this, in which the New England Patriots were found to have videotaped an opposing team from an unapproved location while trying to obtain defensive signals. As was the Pittsburgh Steelers use of, at the time legal, performance enhancers. However, there was cheating proven by the Denver Broncos during their back-to-back titles in the late 1990s to circumvent the league's salary cap and obtain and retain players that they would otherwise not have been able to. Circumvention of rules governing conduct and procedures of a sport can also be considered cheating. a form of collusion.

An example of cheating via judging collusion occurred in the 2002 Winter Olympics figure skating scandal when the Russian team was awarded a gold medal over the Canadian team in an alleged vote-swapping judging deal; the Canadian team's silver medals were eventually upgraded to gold at a second awards ceremony and the French judge was suspended for misconduct. The head of the French skating federation was later also suspended, and both were banned from the 2006 Olympic Games. The International Skating Union modified its judging system as a result of this case.

Cheating is also used to refer to movements in strength training that transfer weight from an isolated or fatigued muscle group to a different or fresh muscle group. This allows the cheater to move an initial greater weight (if the cheating continues through an entire training set) or to continue exercising past the point of muscular exhaustion (if the cheating begins part-way through the set). As strength training is not a sport, cheating has no rule-based consequences, but can result in injury or a failure to meet training goals. This is because each exercise is designed to target specific muscle groups and if the proper form is not used the weight can be transferred away from the targeted group.

=== Video games ===
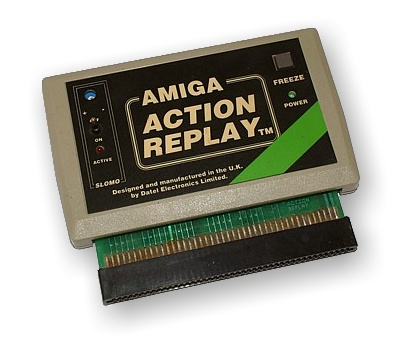
The Action Replay card allows Amiga computer owners to cheat in video games.

In video games, cheating can take the form of secret access codes in single-player games (such as the Konami code) which unlock a bonus for the player when entered, hacks and exploits which give players an unfair advantage in online multiplayer games and single-player modes, or unfair collusion between players in online games (such as a player who spectates a match, removing limitations such as "fog of war", and reports on enemy positions to game partners).

Attitudes towards cheating vary. Using exploits in single-player modes is usually considered to be simply another form of exploring the game's content unless the player's accomplishments are to be submitted competitively, and is common in single-player games with a high difficulty level; however, cheating in multiplayer modes is considered immoral and harshly condemned by fair players and developers alike. Cheating allows casual players to complete games at much-accelerated speed, which can be helpful in some cinematic or single-player games, which can take a subjectively long time to finish, as is typical of the role-playing game (RPG) genre. While this may be seen as a hasty advantage causing no damage to anyone, in a multi-player game such as MMORPGs the repercussions of cheating are much more damaging, breaking the risk/reward curve of the game and causing fair players to lose online matches and/or character development. Cheating in those types of games is generally prohibited – though often widespread anyway. In many circles, the purchasing of items or currency from sources outside the game is also considered to be cheating. The terms of service from many games where this is possible directly prohibit this activity. One area where there is little consensus involves modern free-to-play business models which support and are supported by the exchange of real-world money for in-game services, items, and advantages. Games that grant excessive advantages only available to paying customers may be criticized as being 'pay to win' – sometimes considered a form of "cheating" that is actually legitimatized by the system – whilst games that limit real-money purchases to cosmetic changes are generally accepted as fair.

Another form of video game cheating is when a player does things to interact with game objects that are unforeseen by the programmers and break the intended function or reward system of the object. This can involve the way enemies are encountered, objectives met, items used, or any other game object that contains a software bug. One common example is the exploitation of errors in an enemy's pathfinding; if a player can cause an enemy to become "stuck" in a given terrain feature, that player can then usually kill the enemy from a distance without risk, even if much stronger, and achieve greater rewards than the player is intended to be able to at that level of progression. Another example was common in early first-person shooter games and involved skipping a weapon's reload timer by quickly switching weapons back and forth without actually reloading the weapons, resulting in what was effectively instant reloading. It also can be accomplished through means of altered game files substituted for the normal files, or image graphics changed to permit greater visibility of the targets, etc. – for example, replacing the colors on a dark-colored enemy intended to blend in with the background with a bright color permitting instant visibility and targeting. Generally speaking, there is often some concern that this is not truly cheating, as it is the fault of the programmers that such an exploit exists in the first place. However, technically, as with live sports, it is cheating if the player is not playing the game in a formally approved manner, breaking unwritten rules. In some cases, this behavior is directly prohibited by the terms of service of the game.

=== Gambling ===
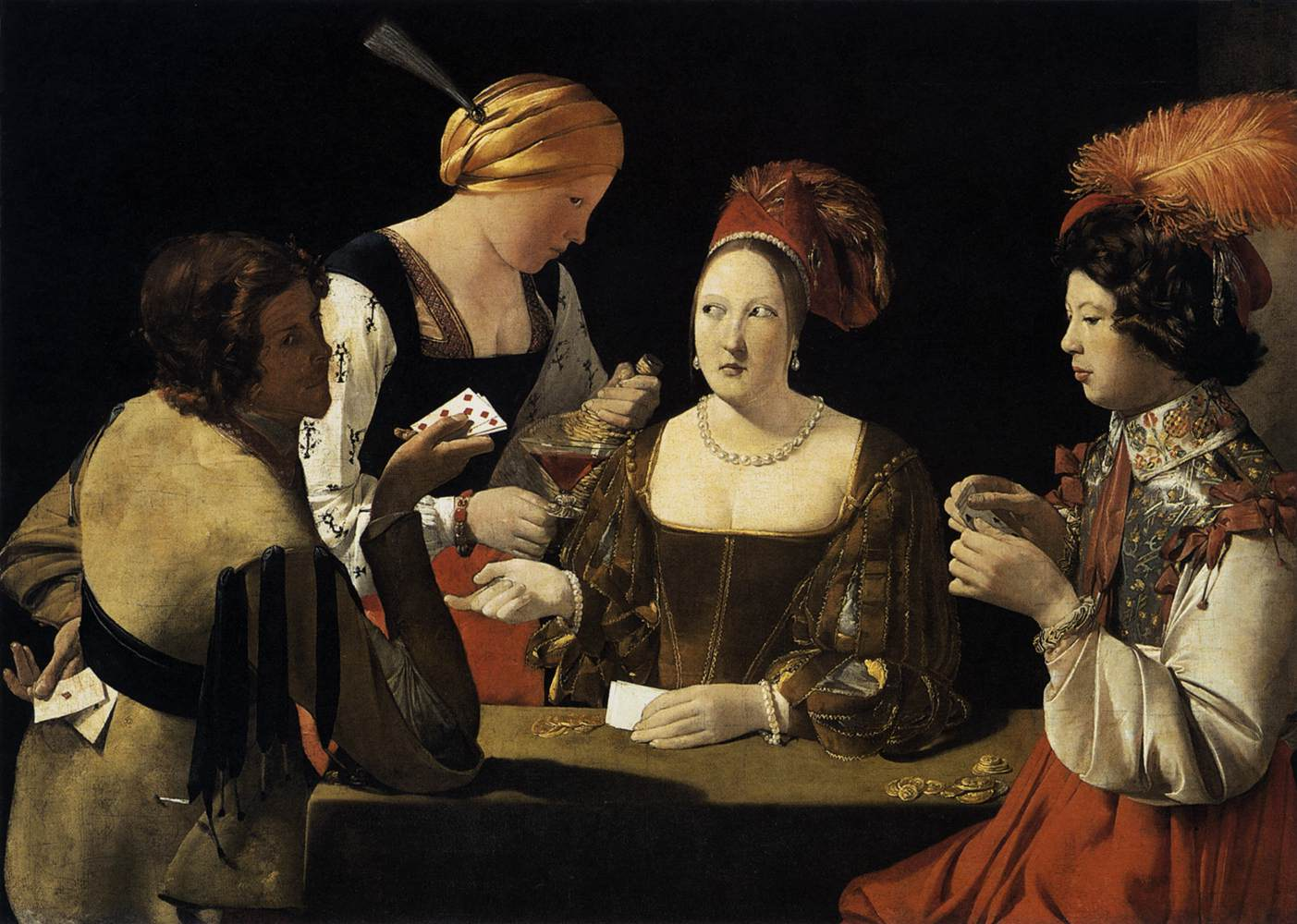
Cheater with the Ace of Diamonds, by Georges de La Tour

The wagering of money on an event extends the motivation for cheating beyond directly participating competitors. As in sport and games, cheating in gambling is generally related to directly breaking rules or laws, or misrepresenting the event being wagered on, or interfering in the outcome. A boxer who takes a dive, a casino which plays with secretly loaded dice, a rigged roulette wheel or slot machine, or a doctored deck of cards, are generally regarded as cheating, because it has misrepresented the likelihood of the game's outcomes beyond what is reasonable to expect a bettor to protect himself against. However, for a bookmaker to flatter a horse in order to sell bets on it at shorter odds may be regarded as salesmanship rather than cheating, since bettors can counter this by informing themselves and by exercising skepticism. Doping a horse is a clear example of cheating by interfering with the instruments of the event under wager. Again, not all interference is cheating; spending money to support the health and well-being of a horse one has wagered on is not in itself generally regarded as cheating, nor is improving the morale of a sportsman one has backed by cheering for them. Generally, interference is more likely to be regarded as cheating if it diminishes the standard of a sporting competition, damages a participant, or modifies the apparatus of the event or game.

In the world of gambling, knowing a secret which is not priced into the odds gives a significant advantage, which may give rise to a perception of cheating. However, legal systems do not regard secretly making use of knowledge in this way as criminal deception in itself. This is in contrast to the financial world, where people with certain categories of relationship to a company are restricted from transacting, which would constitute the crime of insider trading. This may be because of a stronger presumption of equality between investors, or it may be because a company employee who also trades in the company's stock has a conflict of interest, and has thus misrepresented himself the company. An advantage player typically uses mental, observational or technical skills to choose when and how much to bet, and neither interferes with the instruments of the game nor breaks any of its rules. Representatives of the casino industry have claimed that all advantage play is cheating, but this point of view is reflected neither among societies in general nor in legislation. As of 2010, the only example anywhere of a type of advantage play being unlawful is for an advantage player to use an auxiliary device in the U.S. State of Nevada, whose legislation is uniquely influenced by large casino corporations. Nonetheless, it remains a widely held principle that the law should not impose any restraint over the method by which a player arrives at a playing or betting decision from information held by him lawfully and which he is not debarred from under the rules of the game. In "hole carding", a casino player tries to catch sight of the front of cards which are dealt face-down according to the rules. One way of cheating and profiting through gambling is to bet against oneself and then intentionally lose. This is known as throwing a game or taking a dive. Illegal gamblers will at times pay sports players to lose so that they may profit from the otherwise unexpected loss. An especially notorious case is the Black Sox Scandal, when eight players of the 1919 Chicago White Sox took payment from gamblers and intentionally played poorly. Another happened in boxing when Jake LaMotta famously took a dive against Billy Fox in order to obtain his entry to a championship match against Marcel Cerdan, a deal offered by the mobsters who controlled professional boxing.

== Business ==
Various regulations exist to prevent unfair competitive advantages in business and finance, for example competition law, or the prohibition of insider trading.

The most extreme forms of cheating (e.g. attempting to gain money through outright deceit rather than providing a service) are referred to as fraud.

== See also ==
- 1950s quiz show scandals, series of cheating scandals that nearly destroyed the game show genre
- Cheating at the Paralympic Games
- Cheating in bridge
- Cheating in chess
- Cheating in esports
- Cheating in online games
- Cheating in poker
- Gaming the system
- Metagame
- Unfair competition, in business
