= Bahamas Esports Federation =

Governing body

- Abbreviation: BESF
- Formation: 2019
- Type: National sports federation
- Headquarters: Nassau, Bahamas
- President: Michael Armogan
- Secretary General: Deborah Hanna
- Parent organization: International Esports Federation; Global Esports Federation; Esports Integrity Commission
- Website: besf242.org

The Bahamas Esports Federation (BESF) is the national esports governing body of the Bahamas. Founded in October 2019, BESF is a not-for-profit, non-governmental organisation responsible for developing and promoting esports and competitive gaming in The Bahamas. BESF holds Full Membership in the International Esports Federation (IESF) for the Americas region, a status it has held since 2020.

== History ==
BESF was founded in October 2019 by Michael Armogan, who serves as president, with Deborah Hanna as Secretary General. Its founding board included an executive committee and advisory board drawn from the Bahamian gaming community, whose member clubs had been active in the local competitive gaming scene since 2011. Shortly after its formation, BESF became a member of the Esports Integrity Coalition and the Central America & Caribbean Esports Confederation, and joined the International Esports Federation as a Full Member in 2020. In April 2020, BESF hosted community national team trials for League of Legends, drawing players from across The Bahamas.

On 28 October 2020, BESF became a founding member of the Caribbean Esports Federations Alliance (CEFA), a regional body comprising twelve national esports federations including those of Jamaica, the Dominican Republic, Cuba, and others across the Caribbean. In April 2021, BESF signed a memorandum of understanding with the North America Scholastic Esports Federation (NASEF) to implement scholastic esports programmes in Bahamian schools.

By 2025, BESF was working to attract international competitors to Bahamian tournaments and had met with the Ministry of Tourism, Investments and Aviation to discuss positioning esports as a tourism product. President Armogan noted that the Ministry had attended the Esports Travel Summit and was "already interested and looking into" hosting international events.

== International competition ==
BESF oversees the selection and support of Bahamian national esports teams for international competition. In September 2022, Bahamian competitor Johnathon Lucius (then competing under the handle "JTalon") qualified for the IESF World Esports Championships held in Bali, Indonesia, competing in Tekken 7. Lucius returned to the 2023 IESF World Championships in Iași, Romania, reaching the playoff stage before finishing 33rd out of 91 competing nations in Tekken 7. In November 2023, Eric Bain represented The Bahamas at the inaugural Pan American Esports Championships held in Santiago, Chile, competing in eFootball as part of the Pan American Games programme.

== Events ==
In August 2024, BESF partnered with telecommunications provider Aliv and Atlantis Resort to host the inaugural Crush Counter Showdown, a tournament featuring Street Fighter 6 and Tekken 8 with a $3,500 prize pool. Mario Bowleg, Minister of Youth, Sports and Culture, attended the event.

== Affiliations ==
- International Esports Federation – Full Member, Americas region (since 2020)
- Esports Integrity Commission – Active national federation member
- Global Esports Federation – Member federation
- Caribbean Esports Federations Alliance – Founding member (2020)
- North America Scholastic Esports Federation (NASEF) – MOU partner (since 2021)
