= Flick Stick =

Video game control method

Flick Stick is a video game control scheme designed for gyroscopic game controllers. The Flick Stick control scheme is primarily designed for 3D shooter games with the intent of bringing the perceived advantages of mouse aiming to controllers, while addressing shortcomings of traditional first-person shooter controller schemes.

Flick Stick was designed by game developer Julian "Jibb" Smart in 2018. In 2020, it was integrated into Steam as an option within Steam Input. Multiple commercial games, such as Counter-Strike: Global Offensive, Fortnite, Deathloop, and Call of Duty: Modern Warfare II (and by extension, Call of Duty: Warzone 2.0) have since added Flick Stick as an alternate control scheme.

== Design ==
In a traditional first-person shooter controller scheme, the right analog stick is used to steer the player character's view in the direction the stick is tilted. A "sensitivity" slider determines the speed the player turns when the analog stick is held. As the player can't turn faster than the highest sensitivity value allows, controller aiming with a traditional control scheme is generally slower than aiming with a mouse.

In a typical Flick Stick control scheme, the player's view snaps to the direction the right analog stick is held, with "up" representing the player's current view (no change). Tilting the stick left will "flick" the player's view 90 degrees to the left, and tilting the stick down will turn the player a full 180 degrees. Once the analog stick is held down, it can be rotated along the gate to turn the player in tandem. The analog stick only affects the horizontal view axis, and all vertical aiming is performed through the controller's gyroscope by tilting the controller in the desired direction. The right analog stick is intended to be used for quick turns, and the gyro is used for precise aiming.

In explaining Flick Stick's design, designer Jibb Smart claimed that analog sticks are "too small" for precise aiming; instead, by treating gyro aim "as a mouse", players would enjoy a higher degree of precision than in traditional control schemes. By reserving the right analog stick for fast sweeping motions, Smart claimed that players will have "more freedom to respond to threats from any direction than even a traditional mouse on a big mousepad".

== History ==
In 2015, Nintendo released Splatoon, a third-person shooter where gyro aiming is the primary method of input. Splatoon intrigued Smart, as the game demonstrated the viability of gyro aiming as a legitimate competitor to traditional control schemes. Following Splatoon's release, Smart would go on to create "JoyShockMapper", a tool which translates gyroscopic controller movements into mouse input, enabling gyro input in PC games which don't formally support it.

Flick Stick functionality was first implemented into an early 2018 prototype of JoyShockMapper, and was included in the program's public 1.0.0 release early the following year. In July 2020, Valve Software integrated Flick Stick as an option in Steam Input, allowing Steam games to be played with Flick Stick controls without the use of external programs.

In July 2021, the Devolver Digital-published game Boomerang X became the first commercial game to natively support Flick Stick. In December of that same year, the control scheme was implemented into Counter-Strike: Global Offensive. In February 2022, Epic Games collaborated with Jibb Smart to officially integrate Flick Stick into Fortnite. In September 2022, Arkane Lyon collaborated with Jibb Smart to implement Flick Stick into the PS5 & PC versions of Deathloop. Call of Duty: Modern Warfare II and Call of Duty: Warzone 2.0 added Flick Stick in their respective Season 2 updates.
