= ESL One Cologne =

ESL One Cologne is a Counter-Strike: Global Offensive tournament run by the Electronic Sports League, with the first three tournaments being sponsored by video game developer Valve. There have been 11 tournaments by the name so far:

- ESL One Cologne 2014
- ESL One Cologne 2015
- ESL One Cologne 2016
- ESL One Cologne 2017
- ESL One Cologne 2018
- ESL One Cologne 2019
- ESL One Cologne 2020
- ESL One Cologne 2021
- ESL One Cologne 2022
- ESL One Cologne 2023
- ESL One Cologne 2024
