= Counter-Strike coaching bug scandal =

Bug abuse scandal in video game

The Counter-Strike coaching bug scandal was a bug abuse scandal in the game Counter-Strike: Global Offensive. The bug had multiple variants, all of which allowed team coaches to see parts of the map they normally would not have access to and gather information about the enemy team.

It was first made public on 26 August 2020 by Wisła Kraków coach Mariusz "Loord" Cybulski. Five days later, three coaches were banned by Esports Integrity Commission (ESIC) for exploiting the bug. ESIC launched an investigation on 4 September and on 28 September, ESIC banned a further 34 coaches after reviewing 20% of the demos. On 5 May 2022, ESIC announced that almost 100 coaches were going to be sanctioned as they neared the completion of the final investigation.

Valve Corporation, the developer of the game, announced on 26 August 2020 that it had fixed the bug.

== Background ==
Counter-Strike: Global Offensive is a multiplayer first-person shooter released in 2012, where two opposing teams compete against each other. Players of the game have incomplete information about the other team and their location, meaning that any method to discover additional information about the other team is extremely powerful.

The bug was first made public by Wisła Kraków coach Mariusz "Loord" Cybulski on 26 August 2020, who said that it allowed him to "see above the map and tell info to the players". The Esports Integrity Commission said that there were three variants of the bug: the "static" bug that placed coaches on a random point, the "free-roam" bug that allowed the coaches to fly around the map, and the "third-person" bug that allowed coaches to watch the match from a third-person view.

== Investigations ==
=== Initial investigations ===
==== August 2020 bans ====
On 31 August 2020, five days after the bug was uncovered, the Esports Integrity Commission banned three coaches due to their involvement in the scandal. These coaches were Ricardo "dead" Sinigaglia of Made in Brazil, Nicolai "HUNDEN" Petersen of Heroic, and Aleksandr "zoneR" Bogatiryev of Hard Legion.

==== September 2020 bans ====
On 4 September, ESIC announced that Michal Slowinski, a tournament admin, and Steve Dudenhoeffer, a software development manager at ESEA, were going to examine the "demos" (in-game video recordings) of coaches dating back to 2016 to see who had abused the bug. Coaches who confessed to using the exploit and assisted in the investigation itself were given a reduction of up to 60% of their suspension period. After reviewing 20% of the 99,650 demos, ESIC announced on 28 September that it had banned 37 coaches for periods ranging from 3 to 36 months.

=== Full investigation ===
On 29 March 2022, Dexerto reported that ESIC was close to finalizing its investigation into the scandal. The Counter-Strike Professional Players Association wanted the results to be published before the next Major, PGL Major Antwerp 2022. ESIC told Dust2.us on 1 May that they intended to release the bans before the Major.

On 5 May, ESIC announced that almost 100 coaches were going to be banned. The organization also temporarily suspended three unnamed coaches who were meant to be at the Antwerp Major. The next day, three days before the Major, ESIC announced that the three coaches were Sergey "hally" Shavayev of Team Spirit, Rafael "zakk" Fernandes of 9z, and Luis "peacemaker" Tadeu. hally and zakk encountered the "static" bug in 2018 to 2020, while peacemaker used the "free-roam" bug in March 2018. It was also determined that none of the coaches used the bug for more than two rounds.

=== Player involvement ===
ESIC had also announced in early September that there was insufficient evidence to determine any player involvement in the scandal. On 26 August 2021, during an interview with TV2.dk, Nicolai "HUNDEN" Petersen claimed that some of the players knew of him using the bug during his time at Heroic. On 3 September, HUNDEN released evidence of two players being aware of the bug. HUNDEN showed a conversation between him and Nikolaj "niko" Kristensen where they talked about the bug. Server logs allegedly show that René "TeSeS" Madsen helped HUNDEN to get into a position on the map. He also claimed that "everyone on [Heroic] knew it." On 18 October, ESIC announced that they had investigated the case. According to ESIC, HUNDEN had "manipulated" niko, who has Attention deficit hyperactivity disorder (ADHD) and Asperger syndrome. The rest of Heroic's players were cleared of any charges as they were "unable to find anywhere near enough evidence" supporting HUNDEN's claims.

== Aftermath ==
=== Players and organizations ===
Hard Legion coach Aleksandr "zoneR" Bogatiryev and K23 coach Aset "Solaar" Sembiyev were removed from their positions by their teams following their bans. mousesports coach Allan "Rejin" Petersen and Gambit coach Ivan "F_1N" Kochugov both admitted exploiting the bug and were also removed from their positions.

ENCE suspended their coach Slaava "Twista" Räsänen after it was revealed he had used the bug in 2017 and moved him to the analyst role for the duration of the ban. Heroic did the same with their coach Nicolai "HUNDEN" Petersen. This practice drew criticism from FaZe Clan head coach Janko "YNk" Paunović, who felt that the two didn't "face the consequences for what [they've] done."

ForZe contested the ban of their coach Sergey "lmbt" Bezhanov and provided an explanation for three of the four cases involving him on 28 September 2020. His 7.5 month ban was lifted two weeks later on 15 October by ESIC. Robert "RobbaN" Dahlström said that the bug occurred to him once and claimed he was not able to fix it despite his best efforts. He also added that he muted his microphone during the match. RobbaN was backed by his team FaZe Clan. Alessandro "Apoka" Marcucci also contested his ban and said that he was not on his PC in two cases and that he learned about the bug later.

=== Valve Corporation ===
The bug was fixed by Valve Corporation, the developer of the game, on 26 August 2020, the same day that Loord exposed the bug on Twitter. On 15 May 2021 however, Sergey "lmbt" Bezhanov released a video on Twitter showing that he is still able to recreate the bug. Following the scandal, Valve Corporation made changes in the Major Championships system on 28 January 2021. One of the changes included a rule which banned coaches from joining the server and being in the same room with players during online matches. The change garnered criticism from coaches and players.

== See also ==
- Counter-Strike match fixing scandal
