= World Esports Association =

Esports organization

- Abbreviation: WESA
- Formation: May 13, 2016; 10 years ago
- Founders: ESL 9 eSports teams: Fnatic; Natus Vincere; Team EnVyUs; Virtus.Pro; G2 Esports; Mousesports; Ninjas in Pyjamas; North; Splyce
- Type: Sporting association
- Website: www.wesa.gg

The World Esports Association (WESA) is an esports association founded in 2016. After a year of development, it was founded by ESL along with nine esports teams. Its founding members were Fnatic, Natus Vincere, Team EnVyUs, FaZe Clan, Virtus.pro, G2 Esports, North, Splyce, Mousesports, and Ninjas in Pyjamas. However, FaZe Clan dropped out of the organization just a day after it was unveiled due to fears of being locked in an exclusivity contract limiting the tournaments teams could play in.

== See also ==
- G7 Teams⁣ – similar organization that lasted from 2008 to 2010
- Professional Esports Association⁣ – similar organization of North American teams also founded in 2016
- International Games and Esports Tribunal - Arbitration non-for-profit specialized on esports
