= ELeague CS:GO Premier 2018 =

ELEAGUE
- 2018

Tournament information
- Sport: Counter-Strike: Global Offensive
- Location: Atlanta, Georgia, United States
- Dates: July 21, 2018–July 29, 2018
- Administrator: Turner Sports; William Morris Endeavor
- Tournament format(s): Group stage (Bo1/Bo3); Single-Elimination Brackets (Bo3)
- Venue: Turner Studios
- Teams: 8 teams

Final positions
- Champions: Astralis
- 1st runners-up: Team Liquid
- 2nd runners-up: mousesports Natus Vincere
- MVP: Nicolai "dev1ce" Reedtz

ELEAGUE CS:GO Premier 2018 was the sixth season of ELEAGUE that started on July 21, 2018, and ended on July 29, 2018. It was broadcast on the American cable television network TBS. The season featured eight teams from across the world competing in a season. The broadcast was simultaneously available on the online streaming service Twitch and YouTube Gaming, but when on television, a limited broadcast appeared on Twitch and YouTube.

== Results ==
The finals pitted Astralis, which won the ELEAGUE Major 2017, and Team Liquid. Astralis defeated Team Liquid 2–0 and did not drop a single map in the tournament to win the championship.

== Format ==
The format was similar to that of ELEAGUE Season 2. All eight teams were invited based on their top eight HLTV.org ranks from May 21, 2018. The seeding was the reorganized once the event came around to better reflect the teams' rankings.

The group stage featured two groups of four teams, with each group being a standard GSL format. All matchups wete best of three series. The highest seed in the group played against the lowest seed and the other two teams played against each other. The two winners and two losers then played against each other. The winner of the winner's match moved on to the Playoffs and the loser of the winners match played a third match against the winner of the losers match. The loser of the losers match is eliminated from the tournament. The last two teams in the group will play in a decider's match; the winner of the match will get a spot in the Playoffs and the loser will head home. The top two teams in each group will advance to the Playoffs.

The Playoffs consisted of the four teams. Teams will play in a single elimination, best of three bracket and will keep playing until a winner is decided. Each group winner will face off against a group runner-up in the semifinals.

== Teams ==
Eight teams were invited to the Premier. In parentheses are the HLTV.org ranks from May 21, 2018.

- Astralis (1)
- Cloud9 (7)
- FaZe Clan (2)
- Fnatic (5)
- mibr (8)
- mousesports (4)
- Natus Vincere (3)
- Team Liquid (6)

== Broadcast Talent ==
Host

- Alex "Machine" Richardson

Interviewer

- Sue "Smix" Lee

Commentators/Analysts

- James Bardolph
- Anders Blume
- Daniel "ddk" Kapadia
- Jason "moses" O'Toole
- Janko "YNk" Paunović

== Group stage ==
=== Group A ===
| Seed | Team | W-L | RF-RA | RD | Points |
|---|---|---|---|---|---|
| 1 | Astralis | 2–0 | 67–43 | +24 | 6 |
| 2 | Team Liquid | 2–1 | 83–69 | +14 | 6 |
| 3 | mibr | 1–2 | 72–86 | −14 | 3 |
| 4 | Cloud9 | 0–2 | 46–70 | −24 | 0 |

Group A Results
| Astralis | 2 | 0 | Cloud9 |
| Team Liquid | 2 | 0 | mibr |
| Astralis | 2 | 0 | Team Liquid |
| mibr | 2 | 0 | Cloud9 |
| Team Liquid | 2 | 0 | mibr |

Group A Scores

Group A scores
| Team | Score | Map | Score | Team |
|---|---|---|---|---|
| Astralis | 19 | Inferno | 15 | Cloud9 |
| Astralis | 16 | Overpass | 9 | Cloud9 |
| Astralis | – | Train | – | Cloud9 |
| Team Liquid | 16 | Inferno | 8 | mibr |
| Team Liquid | 16 | Cache | 9 | mibr |
| Team Liquid | – | Mirage | – | mibr |
| Astralis | 16 | Nuke | 12 | Team Liquid |
| Astralis | 16 | Mirage | 7 | Team Liquid |
| Astralis | – | Inferno | – | Team Liquid |
| mibr | 16 | Inferno | 5 | Cloud9 |
| mibr | 19 | Cache | 17 | Cloud9 |
| mibr | – | Overpass | – | Cloud9 |
| Team Liquid | 16 | Cache | 10 | mibr |
| Team Liquid | 16 | Overpass | 10 | mibr |
| Team Liquid | – | Inferno | – | mibr |

=== Group B ===
| Seed | Team | W-L | RF-RA | RD | Points |
|---|---|---|---|---|---|
| 1 | Natus Vincere | 2–0 | 89–71 | +18 | 6 |
| 2 | mousesports | 2–1 | 122–125 | −3 | 6 |
| 3 | Fnatic | 1–2 | 111–117 | −6 | 3 |
| 4 | FaZe Clan | 0–2 | 70–78 | −8 | 0 |

Group B Results
| Natus Vincere | 2 | 1 | Fnatic |
| FaZe Clan | 1 | 2 | mousesports |
| Natus Vincere | 2 | 1 | mousesports |
| FaZe Clan | 0 | 2 | Fnatic |
| mousesports | 2 | 1 | Fnatic |

Group B Scores

Group B Scores
| Team | Score | Map | Score | Team |
|---|---|---|---|---|
| Natus Vincere | 16 | Mirage | 13 | Fnatic |
| Natus Vincere | 11 | Inferno | 16 | Fnatic |
| Natus Vincere | 16 | Train | 8 | Fnatic |
| FaZe Clan | 16 | Train | 11 | mousesports |
| FaZe Clan | 12 | Cache | 16 | mousesports |
| FaZe Clan | 13 | Mirage | 16 | mousesports |
| Natus Vincere | 14 | Inferno | 16 | mousesports |
| Natus Vincere | 16 | Train | 7 | mousesports |
| Natus Vincere | 16 | Mirage | 11 | mousesports |
| FaZe Clan | 15 | Dust II | 19 | Fnatic |
| FaZe Clan | 14 | Mirage | 16 | Fnatic |
| FaZe Clan | – | Inferno | – | Fnatic |
| mousesports | 13 | Inferno | 16 | Fnatic |
| mousesports | 16 | Train | 14 | Fnatic |
| mousesports | 16 | Mirage | 9 | Fnatic |

== Playoffs ==
Semifinals
A1 | Astralis | 2
B2 | mousesports | 0
B1 | Natus Vincere | 0
A2 | Team Liquid | 2

Finals
A1 | Astralis | 2
A2 | Team Liquid | 0

Semifinals Scores
| Team | Score | Map | Score | Team |
|---|---|---|---|---|
| Astralis | 16 | Nuke | 11 | mousesports |
| Astralis | 16 | Mirage | 10 | mousesports |
| Astralis | – | Inferno | – | mousesports |
| Natus Vincere | 13 | Dust II | 16 | Team Liquid |
| Natus Vincere | 13 | Overpass | 16 | Team Liquid |
| Natus Vincere | – | Nuke | – | Team Liquid |

Finals Scores
| Team | Score | Map | Score | Team |
|---|---|---|---|---|
| Astralis | 16 | Inferno | 5 | Team Liquid |
| Astralis | 16 | Nuke | 12 | Team Liquid |
| Astralis | – | Dust II | – | Team Liquid |

== Final standings ==
The final standings, prize money distribution, and teams' rosters and coaches are shown below. Each team's in-game leader is shown first.

Final Standings
| Place | Prize Money | Team | Roster | Coach |
|---|---|---|---|---|
| 1st | US$500,000 | Astralis | gla1ve, dev1ce, dupreeh, Magisk, Xyp9x | zonic |
| 2nd | US$200,000 | Team Liquid | nitr0, ELiGE, NAF, Twistzz, TACO | jokasteve |
| 3rd – 4th | US$80,000 | Natus Vincere | Zeus, Edward, s1mple, electronic, flamie | kane |
| 3rd – 4th | US$80,000 | mousesports | chrisJ, oskar, ropz, Snax, suNny | lmbt |
| 5th – 6th | US$40,000 | Fnatic | Xizt, draken, flusha, KRiMZ, JW | Jumpy |
| 5th – 6th | US$40,000 | mibr | FalleN, coldzera, fer, Stewie2K, tarik | |
| 7th – 8th | US$30,000 | Cloud9 | Golden, autimatic, RUSH, Skadoodle, STYKO | valens |
| 7th – 8th | US$30,000 | FaZe Clan | karrigan, GuardiaN, NiKo, olofmeister, rain | RobbaN |
