= Counter-Strike match-fixing scandal =

Match fixing scandal in professional Counter-Strike: Global Offensive

The Counter-Strike match-fixing scandal was a 2014 match fixing scandal in the North American professional scene of Counter-Strike: Global Offensive (CS:GO). It involved a match between two teams, iBUYPOWER and NetCodeGuides.com, where questionable and unsportsmanlike performance from the team iBUYPOWER, then considered the best North American team, drew suspicion, resulting in a loss for the team; allegations quickly surfaced afterwards that the match was fixed. More decisive evidence and punishments would come half a year later, after an expository article was published by esports journalist Richard Lewis.

The event resulted in the bans of six North American players along with one associated person by the game's developer and organizer of Counter-Strike's Major tournaments, Valve. The severity of the punishment shocked the community; Valve, a year later, reiterated that the bans are permanent and any other caught matchfixers would be treated the same. A retrospective article on the Counter-Strike news platform Dust2 called the scandal "the most famous of all CS:GO scandals".

== Background ==
Counter-Strike: Global Offensive is a team-based first-person shooter developed by Valve and Hidden Path Entertainment that released in 2012. The game itself was built atop the Counter-Strike mod from 1999 which subsequently built out into a game series by Valve. Players in the game take the role of a terrorist or a counter-terrorist, with each team having a unique goal to complete before they are eliminated by the opposing team or before the timed round is completed. For example, the terrorist team may be required to plant and defend a bomb at a specific site, while the counter-terrorists must eliminate the terrorists before it can be planted, or disarm the bomb once it has been activated.

=== Skins as a currency and skin gambling ===
The introduction of the Arms Deal update to Global Offensive in August 2013 added cosmetic items termed "skins" to the game. The skins are virtual goods that alter the look of the game's weapons; they have no impact on the gameplay itself. These skins could be freely exchanged through the trading feature built into the digital distribution platform Steam, as well as sold on the Steam Community Market platform. The model is similar to another Valve game, Team Fortress 2; because of the rarity and other qualities, certain skins became highly sought after by players. Skins became a form of virtual currency, with some items like special cosmetic knives worth thousands of United States dollars.

As Global Offensive's popularity as an esport grew with increased viewership, there also came a desire for players to bet and gamble on matches. Outside of the United States, several sites arose to allow users to bet with direct cash funds on the result of matches from games like Global Offensive. Cash gambling on sports, including esports, had been banned in some European countries, and, up through May 2018, in all but four states within the United States under the Professional and Amateur Sports Protection Act of 1992 (PASPA). American case law, however, has determined that the use of virtual goods for betting on the outcome of matches is legal and not covered under gambling laws.

Some of the websites created to help with trading of Global Offensive skins started offering mechanisms for gambling with skins, appearing to avoid the conflation with real-world currency. These originated as sites that allowed players to use skins to bet on esport matches. Players would bet one or more skins from their Steam inventory, which are then moved to an account managed by the gambling site. Upon winning, the player would be given back their skins and a distribution of the skins that the losing players had offered. One of these websites, called CS:GO Lounge, had become quite popular; the bets placed on this match were placed through the mentioned platform. The platform would cease its skin gambling operations after being sent a cease & desist letter by Valve in the fallout of the CSGO Lotto scandal.

=== The teams ===
The team, playing under the banner of the custom PC manufacturer iBUYPOWER, at the time of the match consisted of the players Sam "DaZeD" Marine, Joshua "Steel" Nissan, Braxton "Swag" Pierce, Keven "AZK" Larivière and Tyler "Skadoodle" Latham; the team core of DaZeD, AZK and Skadoodle had been playing for the team since October 2013, while the players Swag and Steel joined the roster around March 2014, 5 months before the match. The team was considered as one of the best in the region and a serious international contender; the signing of Swag and Steel drove excitement for the performance of the team. This roster would have considerable international success in 2014, being able to win an international tournament in June, coming in second place in an October tournament, as well as securing a top 8 finish in the coveted ESWC 2014 tournament; their results in official majors were considered subpar.

NetcodeGuides.com, a website specializing in CS:GO tutoring, which was partly owned by the iBUYPOWER player DaZeD, hosted a team consisting of the players nicknamed tarik, hazed, reltuC, FNS and JDM64. The team was considered inexperienced compared to iBUYPOWER and the players playing for this team were young. Regardless, some of the players went on to have successful careers in the competitive circuits of Counter-Strike and VALORANT, for example, tarik, who played with Skadoodle in the Cloud9 lineup that won the ELEAGUE Major: Boston 2018 and earned the major's most valuable player trophy, the only North American player to do so, as well as FNS, who was the in-game leader for the 2022 OpTic Gaming roster in VALORANT, highly regarded as strong contenders for an international trophy.

== The match ==
iBUYPOWER vs. NetcodeGuides.com
iBUYPOWER		NetcodeGuides.com
4	de_season	16
- Date: 21 August 2014
- Venue: Match played online

The match was played on August 21, 2014, during the CEVO Professional Season 5 tournament, which was the top-level tournament in North America at the time. The match was played on the map de_season, a map seldom played, this tournament being one of only few to feature this map in a professional setting. The match was streamed on the Twitch platform, a recording of the match was later made available on YouTube. iBUYPOWER had already qualified for the playoffs of the event, but team NetcodeGuides.com had to win one game to make it to the playoffs of the event. iBUYPOWER was heavily favored to win the match, as they were considered much more experienced than the opposing team - they were in contention of the title of the best American team against team Cloud9, as well as having competed toe-to-toe with European teams, which were considered better than the North American counterparts and having made headways in top-level international tournaments before the match.

=== Gameplay of the match ===
On the first half, iBUYPOWER lost the opening round, also called the pistol round, which is considered an important round in the game. On round two, the team committed to a 'buy round' where the team spends their money on equipment, which is considered unusual if a team has lost the first round, since the value of the equipment that can be bought on the loss of an opening round is usually low. NetcodeGuides.com ended up winning the six rounds before iBUYPOWER won a round. iBUYPOWER ended up winning 4 rounds in the first half, ending the half in a score of 4–11. In the second half, NetcodeGuides won the 5 remaining rounds in a row to win the game.

The casters of the match made comments about the team not being in shape and using only basic strategies, while also pointing out inconsistencies regarding to the losing team's gameplay, such as the player Skadoodle, the team's dedicated sniper player, not carrying a sniper rifle on the opportunity to do so. Other match-ups against the same team had resulted in victories, and the decisive nature of the loss drew attention, particularly regarding the strange strategies employed by iBUYPOWER, such as attempting to carry out kills with the knife, a weapon usually only used as a bad manners move. Other contemporary analyses blamed travel issues — iBUYPOWER had just played at the ESL One Cologne 2014 major tournament, and could have been exhausted after — and unfamiliarity with the map.

== Evidence of matchfixing ==
The next day, journalist Richard Lewis of Dot Esports received a tip consisting of screenshots of a conversation with player Shahzeb "ShahZaM" Khan, who was friendly with the players of both teams, before the game; in the messages, Khan claimed that the match had been fixed and iBUYPOWER was to lose the match. While Khan declared his own innocence, he ultimately refused to reveal who was behind the match fixing. As a result, this evidence wasn't treated seriously by the community, owing to the reputation of the players.

In January 2015, the case resurfaced when a former girlfriend of an iBUYPOWER player posted a string of incriminating text messages between herself and Derek "dboorn" Boorn. In the texts, Boorn, who by this time had moved on to a new team, confirmed that the match had been fixed and that he had bet for the team using alternate accounts on the at-time popular CS:GO Lounge platform, used for conducting trading of in-game items, as well as placing bets on matches with the in-game items. The messages also revealed the identity of the individual who placed the bets on the team: Duc "cud" Pham, a player who was prominent in the trading and skin gambling communities. The CS:GO Lounge platform's moderation team upon further investigation found that Pham had used nine accounts to place wagers that yielded a return of $1,193.14 each, for a total of $10,738.26 in gains from match fixing; this fact did not go public until Dot Esports provided additional evidence that linked the teams to the scandal. The revelations came at a time when some of iBUYPOWER's former players were in the process of creating a new team, with the organization Evil Geniuses being named as among the potential candidates for hosting the players, by now no longer playing under the iBUYPOWER banner.

Potential non-monetary motivations for match fixing included conflicts of interest between iBUYPOWER players and the NetcodeGuides.com team and the fact that the win placed team NetcodeGuides one game away from qualification for the LAN finals with just two matches to play, as the player DaZeD was a part-owner of the NetcodeGuides.com platform and team. iBUYPOWER eventually placed first in the tournament, which involved scoring a follow-up victory over team NetcodeGuides.

== Consequences and aftermath ==
=== Direct consequences and punishments ===
On 26 January 2015, Valve issued a blog post on the official Counter-Strike webpage, titled "Integrity and Fair Play", which announced the permanent bans of six players - cud, dboorn, DaZeD, steel, swag, AZK, as well as another part-owner of the NetCodeGuides.com platform, Casey Foster - from all future Valve-sponsored professional tournaments. Skadoodle refused to accept the spoils of the matchfix, and was subsequently not banned by Valve. Valve's official release confirmed that "a substantial number of high valued items" were transferred from accounts owned by Pham to iBUYPOWER players and Foster. Subsequently, the players were also banned from participating in tournaments hosted by top-level tournament organizers, namely ESL and Dreamhack, and later ELEAGUE. A follow-up post, "A Follow Up to Integrity and Fair Play", reified the stance of Valve that the bans are permanent, and any other players proven to have matchfixed would also be permanently banned.

iBUYPOWER had released DaZeD and steel back in November, and the rest of the team had been released by January 5, 2015. The players had reportedly been trying to create a new team, with the organization Evil Geniuses a likely organization to host the team; the player Hiko was planned to be playing on the team alongside ex-iBUYPOWER members.

On August 1, 2017, ESL unbanned the players of iBUYPOWER, allowing them to play in all ESL Counter-Strike events, except for majors, which were hosted by Valve, ESL only acting as the production company in the tournaments. DreamHack followed suit for its own events, except for Valve majors, on September 6, bringing itself in line with guidelines issued by the Esports Integrity Coalition.

On January 26, 2025, 10 years after the four players of iBUYPOWER were banned, the players were allowed to once again participate in Valve events.

=== Legacy ===
The players continued playing Counter-Strike after the bans. Cloud9 ended up signing Skadoodle, the only member of the team that wasn't punished, in April 2015; Skadoodle played for the team for more than 3 years and helped win the ELEAGUE Major: Boston 2018, the only major won by a North American team to date. swag was signed by Cloud9 as its new analyst and streamer, occasionally playing as a stand-in player during non-Valve tournaments; he was part of the team until August 2017. They continued to have an impact on the regional scene by streaming gameplay and coaching and assisting young players. Though most organizations would not sign the players due to them having been banned, they continued playing smaller tournaments with and helping develop young talent, playing in teams with them and providing a platform for the young players to prove themselves; the players played with such players as TenZ, Zellsis, yay, leaf and vanity, who have gone on to find success in both the Counter-Strike and VALORANT professional circuits.

Richard Lewis, the journalist that broke the scandal, has scolded Valve for its response to the scandal, saying that the ban was a "brutally disproportionate punishment that was issued not based on the merits of what had occurred but instead issued to make an example of the players". The players also sought opportunities in new games, such as Overwatch and VALORANT. The players weren't considered banned under the competitive rules of the aforementioned games; some teams signed these players because of their pedigree in Counter-Strike. Steel in particular found major success in VALORANT, playing under organizations such as 100 Thieves and T1, helping claim multiple tournament victories for the teams.

The event is considered by many in the community as having had a negative impact on North American professional CS:GO landscape. Initially, North America was reduced from having two teams that were competitive on the top level to one; this would later change with the success of the North American rosters of such teams as Team Liquid and OpTic Gaming, however, some writers credit this ban as contributing to the demise of professional Counter-Strike in North America, particularly USA.

== See also ==
- Counter-Strike coaching bug scandal
