= ESEA League =

Competitive video gaming online league

ESEA League logo

E-Sports Entertainment Association League (ESEA League) is an esports competitive video gaming online league & community founded by E-Sports Entertainment Association (ESEA). The company is widely known for their anti-cheat software. ESEA features a system that allows players of all levels to play matches with others.

== History ==
ESEA League began offering lessons to improve gaming skills in 2003 providing instruction in Half-Life, Counter-Strike, and Warcraft III. ESEA created the first professional fantasy e-sports league in 2004. ESEA began its league history with Counter-Strike, but later added Team Fortress 2 (TF2) a game which gained more popularity after its adaption to "Free-to-play" gaming. However, due to the relative lack of players in its TF2 leagues, ESEA announced its intent to shut down the TF2 leagues on April 17, 2019.

== Viewing ==
ESEA League games can be viewed by fans as live streams from internet broadcasting channels such as eXtv, Nova Spivack's Live Matrix, TeamFortress.tv, streams on Twitch and clips on YouTube. The annual sponsored ESEA League LAN Finals are held in Dallas, Texas.

== Bitcoin mining incident ==
On 1 May 2013, a user reported that the ESEA's anti-cheat software was being used to mine bitcoins without the user's consent. This was confirmed by ESEA's co-founder Eric 'lpkane' Thunberg in two subsequent forum posts. As of the date of discovery, the claimed dollar value of bitcoins mined totaled $3,713.55. As of November 2013, ESEA has agreed to a US$1 million settlement, though a separate class action lawsuit is still ongoing.

== Middle East region ==
In 2017, the company announced new server expansion in Dubai to serve the CS:GO community in Middle East. In April 2018, ESEA announced Rank S division for players in that region. Later in May 2018, ESEA announced the first CS:GO League for Middle East teams.

== See also ==
- Electronic Sports League
