= Esports Integrity Commission =

Committee to investigate cheating in esports

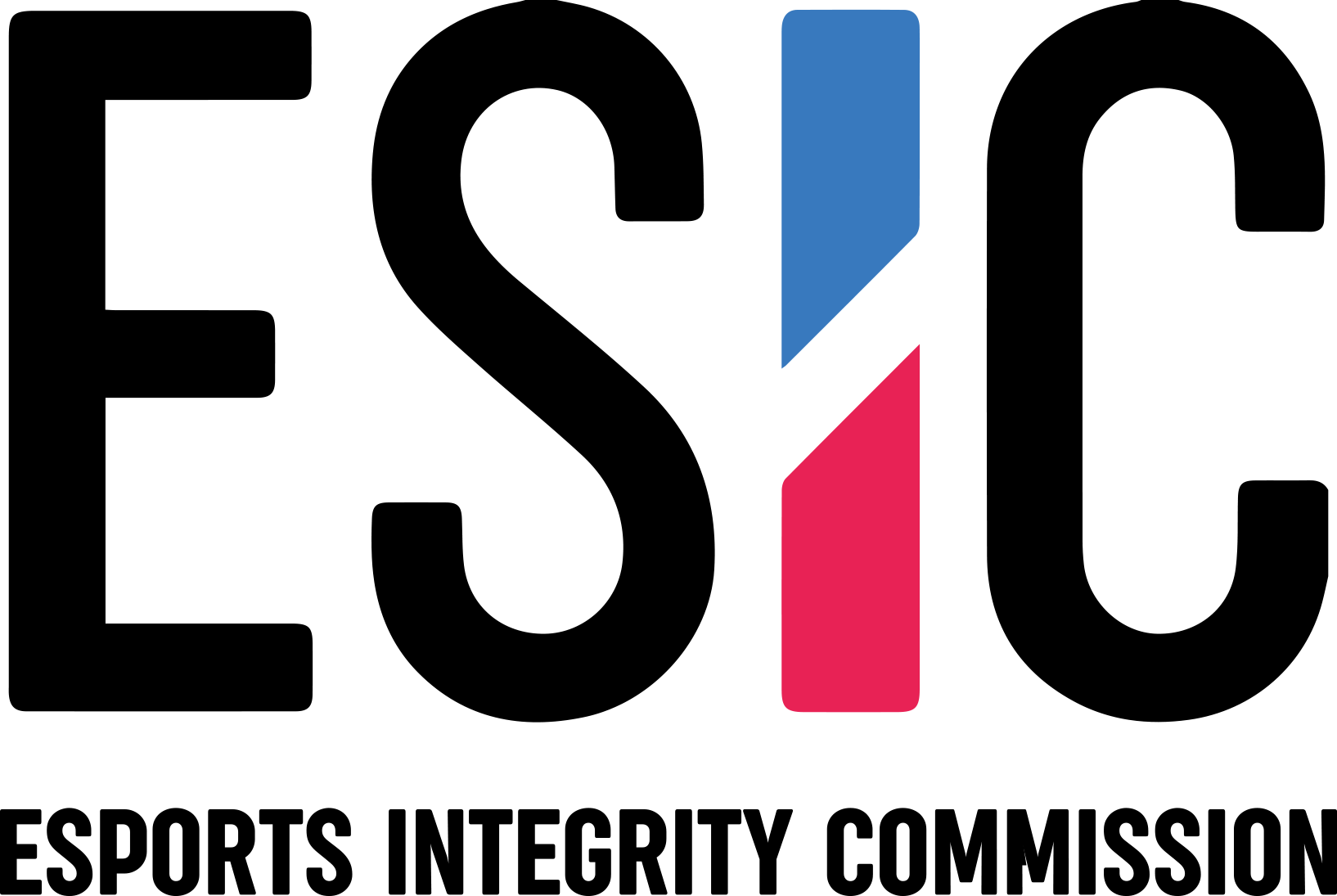
- Formerly: Esports Integrity Coalition
- Founded: 2016
- Headquarters: Shrewsbury, England; Parramatta, Australia
- Key people: Ian Smith (Commissioner)
- Services: Preventing corruption in esports.
- Website: esic.gg

The Esports Integrity Commission (ESIC), formerly the Esports Integrity Coalition, is a non-profit members' association established in 2016 to promote and facilitate competitive integrity in esports. Notable for investigating the coaching bug scandal in Counter-Strike: Global Offensive, the organization has received criticisms for a lack of resources and game knowledge.

== History ==
The organization was founded in 2016 by Ian Smith as the "Esports Integrity Coalition". The entity underwent a rebranding in 2019. Smith had been an attorney working in sports regulation law before he was brought into the Global Offensive scene to investigate skin gambling. His recognition of the lack of regulatory bodies in the scene led to the founding of ESIC.

In 2019, World Intellectual Property Organization Arbitration and Mediation Center (WIPO AMC) conducted a global survey on digital copyright and content disputes, which allowed to aware the increasing number of disputes occurring in sports. That results started, in 2021, a discussion on the necessity in having a one-stop shop dispute resolution mechanism in esports. WIPO AMC contacted the Esports Integrity Commission (ESIC). Both organizations agreed in combine ESIC's integrity expertise with WIPO's authority in intellectual property dispute resolution. From this collaboration the International Games and Esports Tribunal (IGET) was created and launched in January 2025, as an not-for-profit dispute resolution body and an industry-specific platform, tailored for esports.

== Services ==
The commission works to investigate and prevent all forms of match fixing, cheating, and use of doping, most recently investigating the coaching bug in Counter-Strike: Global Offensive. The commission only employs five full-time workers and works by partnering with several betting websites and tournament organizers. The results of investigations are passed on to the organizers, who enforce the sanctions recommended by ESIC.

== Criticism ==
While ESIC was initially seen as a positive project, the organization has come under significant criticism regarding its legitimacy and competence. According to The Washington Post, unnamed critics have described the organization as "underfunded". ESIC doing its work mostly hidden from the public has also caused "public speculation [to curdle] into skepticism". Although ESIC received plaudits for the CS:GO coaching bug investigation, the organization has also been criticized for a perceived lack of expertise about the games it regulates.

The ban of Team Spirit's coach just before the PGL Major Antwerp 2022 for a minor offense of the coaching bug in 2020 due to ESIC's investigation stalling at the time and the eventual overturn right after the major caused backlash from the CS:GO community. ESIC was criticized in December 2022 when it lifted Nicolai "HUNDEN" Petersen's two-year ban early after a "constructive engagement between the two parties". HUNDEN was banned by ESIC in August 2021 after he leaked the strategy folder of Heroic, the team he was coaching, to other teams during IEM Cologne 2021.
