= Counter-Strike: Global Offensive =

2012 video game

- Developers: Valve; Hidden Path Entertainment
- Publisher: Valve
- Composer: Mike Morasky
- Series: Counter-Strike
- Engine: Source
- Platforms: OS X; PlayStation 3; Windows; Xbox 360; Linux
- Release: OS X, PS3, Windows, 360; August 21, 2012; Linux; September 23, 2014
- Genre: Tactical first-person shooter
- Mode: Multiplayer

Counter-Strike: Global Offensive (CS:GO) is a multiplayer tactical first-person shooter developed by Valve and Hidden Path Entertainment. It is the fourth game in the Counter-Strike series. Developed for over two years, Global Offensive was released for OS X, PlayStation 3, Windows, and Xbox 360 in August 2012, and for Linux in 2014. In December 2018, Valve transitioned the game to a free-to-play model, focusing on revenue from cosmetic items.

The game pits two teams, Terrorists and Counter-Terrorists, against each other in different objective-based game modes. The most common game modes involve the Terrorists planting a bomb while Counter-Terrorists attempt to stop them, or Counter-Terrorists attempting to rescue hostages that the Terrorists have captured. There are nine official game modes, all of which have distinct characteristics specific to that mode. The game also has matchmaking support that allows players to play on dedicated Valve servers, in addition to community-hosted servers with custom maps and game modes. A battle-royale game-mode, "Danger Zone", was introduced in late 2018.

Global Offensive received positive reviews from critics on release, who praised the game for its gameplay and faithfulness to the Counter-Strike series, though it was criticized for some early features and the differences between the console and PC versions. Since its release, it has drawn in an estimated 11 million players per month and remains one of the most played games on Valve's Steam platform. The game had an active esports scene, continuing the history of international competitive play from previous games in the series. Teams competed in professional leagues and tournaments, with the game often cited as being among the best in esports.

Counter-Strike 2, a major update bringing the game to the Source 2 engine, was announced in March 2023 and released in September. Official matchmaking for Global Offensive was shut down upon the release of the update, though players are still able to connect to community servers. The game remains playable on the PlayStation 3 and Xbox 360.

== Gameplay ==
Global Offensive, like prior games in the Counter-Strike series, is an objective-based, multiplayer first-person shooter. Two opposing teams, the Terrorists and the Counter-Terrorists, compete in game modes to repeatedly complete objectives, such as securing a location to plant or defuse a bomb and rescuing or capturing hostages. At the end of each short round, players are rewarded based on individual and team performance with in-game currency to spend on other weapons or utility in subsequent rounds. Winning rounds generally rewards more money than losing does, and completing map-based objectives, including killing enemies, gives additional cash bonuses.

An in-progress match on Dust II, in which the player is using an AK-47

Global Offensive has nine official game modes: Competitive, Casual, Deathmatch, Arms Race, Demolition, Wingman, Flying Scoutsman, Retakes and Danger Zone. Competitive mode, the primary gameplay experience, pits two teams of five players against each other in a best-of-30 match. When playing Competitive, players have a skill rank based on a Glicko rating system and are paired with and against other players around the same ranking. The Casual and Deathmatch modes are less serious than Competitive mode and do not register friendly fire. Both are primarily used as a practice tool. Arms Race and Demolition, both based on mods for previous iterations in the series, were added alongside eight new maps for the modes. Arms Race is the Global Offensive variant of the "Gun Game" mode in other games in the series. Demolition is another bomb defusal game mode, with gun upgrades only given to players who killed an enemy in the previous round. Wingman is a two-on-two bomb defusal game mode taking place over sixteen rounds. Similar to Competitive, players are paired based on a dynamic skill ranking. The Flying Scoutsman mode equips players with only a SSG 08 (informally called the "Scout") and a knife in a low-gravity map. Retakes is a gamemode where three Terrorists will defend an already planted C4 against 4 Counter-Terrorists. Players will also be able to choose a loadout card at the beginning of each round to retake (or defend) the bomb site. Danger Zone was a battle-royale mode in which up to 18 players search for weapons, equipment, and money in an effort to be the last person or team remaining. Valve also included an offline practice mode designed to help new players learn how to use guns and grenades, called the Weapons Course. Apart from the Weapons Course and Danger Zone, all other game modes can be played online or offline with bots.

There are five categories of purchasable weaponry: rifles, submachine guns, "heavy" weaponry (light machine guns and shotguns), pistols, and grenades. Each gun in Global Offensive has a unique recoil pattern that can be controlled, a gameplay feature the series has long been associated with. Global Offensive also introduced weapons and equipment not seen in previous installments, including tasers and an incendiary grenade.

In-game matchmaking is supported for all online game modes and is managed through the Steam platform. The game servers run Valve Anti-Cheat to prevent cheating. One form of matchmaking in Global Offensive to prevent cheating is Prime Matchmaking which hosts matches that can only be played with other users with the "Prime" status. This feature also results in more equal matches as there are fewer "smurfs" in these matches. The PC version of Global Offensive also supports private dedicated servers that players may connect to through the community server menu in-game. These servers may be heavily modified and can drastically differ from the base game modes. There have been many community-made mods for the game, one of the popular ones being Kreedz Climbing, a mod that makes players complete obstacle courses requiring advanced strafing and jumping techniques.

== Development and release ==
External videos
- Counter-Strike: A Brief History, a YouTube video published by Valve on January 23, 2017

Counter-Strike: Global Offensive is the next installment in the Counter-Strike series following first-person shooter Counter-Strike: Source, both developed by Valve. Global Offensive's development began when Hidden Path Entertainment attempted to port Counter-Strike: Source onto video game consoles. During its development, Valve saw the opportunity to turn the port into a full game and expand on the predecessor's gameplay. Global Offensive began development in March 2010, and was revealed to the public on August 12, 2011. The closed beta started on November 30, 2011, and was initially restricted to around ten thousand people who received a key at events intended to showcase Global Offensive. After issues with client and server stability were addressed, the beta was opened up to progressively more people, and at E3 2012, Valve announced that Global Offensive would be released on August 21, 2012, with the open beta starting roughly a month before that. Before the public beta, Valve invited professional Counter-Strike players to play-test the game and give feedback.

There were plans for cross-platform multiplayer play between Windows, OS X, Linux, Xbox 360, and PlayStation 3 players, but this was ultimately dropped so that the PC and Mac versions could be actively updated. On August 21, 2012, the game was publicly released on all platforms except Linux, which would not be released until September 23, 2014.

=== Post-launch updates ===
Since the initial release of Global Offensive, Valve has continued to update the game by introducing new maps and weapons, game modes, and weapon balancing changes. One of the first major additions to the game post-release was the "Arms Deal" update. Released on August 13, 2013, the update added cosmetic weapon finishes, or skins, to the game. These items are obtainable by a loot box mechanism; players would receive cases that could be unlocked using virtual keys, purchased through in-game microtransactions. Global Offensive has Steam Workshop support, allowing users to upload user-created content, such as maps, weapon skins, and custom game-modes. Some popular user-created skins are added to the game and are obtainable from unboxing them in cases. The creators of the skins are paid when their item is added to a case. These skins helped form a virtual economy in Global Offensive, leading to the creation of gambling, betting, and trading sites. The addition of skins and the associated virtual economy launched Global Offensive's player count past the other games in the Counter-Strike series and is one of the most important updates in the game's history.

Events called "Operations" are held occasionally and can be accessed through purchasable expansion packs in the form of "operation passes." These passes grant access to operation objectives which are spread over different game modes, such as Arms Race and Deathmatch, or in operation-specific game modes, first seen in Operation Hydra, released in May 2017. Completing these challenges rewards the player with XP and the ability to upgrade the operation "coin." The maps in the operations are community made, meaning some of the revenue made goes towards the map designers.

An update in October 2014 added "music kits", which replace the default in-game music with music from soundtrack artists commissioned by Valve. If a player with a music kit equipped becomes the round's most valuable player, their music will play for others at the end of the round. There is a feature that allows kits to be borrowed, and kits can be sold and exchanged through Steam's Community Market.

In 2016, the game saw two remakes of original Counter-Strike maps, as well as the introduction of Prime matchmaking and additional items. As a part of the Operation Wildfire promotion, Nuke was remade and re-released in February with the primary goals being to balance the map and make it more aesthetically pleasing. In April, Prime matchmaking was added to the game. To partake in this mode, the user had to have a verified phone number connected to their account. It was introduced in an attempt to prevent legitimate players from playing with cheaters or high-skilled players playing on alternative, lower ranked accounts, a practice colloquially known as "smurfing". Inferno, another original map, was re-released in October. Valve said they had three reasons behind the remake: "to improve visibility; to make it easier to move around in groups; and to tune it with player feedback." Also in October, consumable items called graffiti were added to the game. These items replaced a feature present in the previous iterations of the series called sprays. Previously, players could customize their sprays. Graffiti ideas can be uploaded to the Steam Workshop in the similar manner as gun skins and players can buy and trade the existing graffiti in game. One month later, glove skins were added.

In September 2017, Valve Company worked with the publisher Perfect World to release Global Offensive in mainland China. Chinese citizens, with their identification verified, can receive the game for free and earn Prime matchmaking status immediately. The game is played through Perfect World's launcher and contains numerous exclusive changes to the game, including the censorship of skulls and other symbols. Some other changes were in the cosmetics in certain maps, for example, the hammer and sickle on Cache and Train were removed. In preparation for the release, multiple cities in China celebrated and heavily promoted its upcoming release. Users who played the game during its launch month received free promotional cosmetics. In compliance with Chinese law, Valve also had to disclose its loot box gambling odds.

In November 2017, an update to the competitive matchmaking was announced. Called the "Trust Factor", it meant a player's "Trust Factor" would be calculated through both in-game and Steam-wide actions. Factors such as playtime on Global Offensive, times a user has been reported for cheating, playtime on other Steam games, and other behaviors hidden by Valve are taken into consideration when a user's "Trust Factor" is developed. This was done in an attempt to let the community bond back together in matchmaking, as Prime matchmaking separated Prime and non-Prime players from each other. Valve will not let users view their "Trust Factor" or reveal all of the factors deciding one's "Trust". In August 2018, an offline version of the game was released that allows the players to play offline with bots.

An update released on December 6, 2018, made the game fully free to play. Users who had purchased the game prior to this update were automatically updated to "Prime" status and given modes that can drop cosmetic items. In addition, the new version introduced a battle royale mode called "Danger Zone", and brought a new interface style called "Panorama", which replaced the former Scaleform Interface.

In November 2019, Operation Shattered Web was released. It operated similarly to the previous operations and introduced new character models and a battle pass system.

In April 2020, source code for 2018 versions of Counter-Strike: Global Offensive and Team Fortress 2 were leaked on the Internet. This created fears that malicious users would take advantage of the code to develop potential remote code execution software and attack game servers or players' own computers. Several ongoing fan projects temporarily halted development in wake of this news until better confirmation of the impact of the leak could be determined. Valve confirmed the legitimacy of the code leaks, but stated they do not believe it impacts servers and clients running the latest official builds of either game.

In December 2020, Operation Broken Fang was released accompanied with a cinematic trailer, the first official Counter-Strike: Global Offensive cinematic trailer in eight years since the official launch trailer.

In May 2021, a subscription service called "CS:GO 360 Stats" was released for US$0.99 per month. It includes access to detailed match stats from official Competitive, Premier, and Wingman game modes and the Round Win Chance report introduced in Operation Broken Fang. The update was met with a mixed response from players, with many pointing to free third-party websites that provided similar stats.

In September 2021, Operation Riptide was released, adding gameplay and matchmaking changes, new maps, and new cosmetic items.

In January 2022, an update adding Flick Stick support for gyroscopic game controllers was released. Flick Stick is a control scheme which lets the player quickly "flick" their view using the right analog stick, while delegating all fine aiming to gyro movements.

=== Counter-Strike 2 ===
In March 2023, Valve announced Counter-Strike 2 as an update to Global Offensive. Following a closed beta that began on March 22, 2023, the game was released on September 27, 2023.

Counter-Strike 2 features major technical improvements over Global Offensive. The Counter-Strike 2 update moved the game from the Source game engine to Source 2, introduced "responsive smokes" that could be interacted with, and redesigned versions of classic series maps. Various features from Global Offensive were removed, such as the game modes Arms Race (which was later reintroduced in early 2024) and Danger Zone, and all 167 in-game achievements were removed. Alongside this, only ten maps were included at launch.

Counter-Strike 2 replaced Global Offensive on Steam, but it remained possible to play Global Offensive on community servers by selecting an older build version in a Steam configuration panel. Global Offensive was later re-listed on Steam on March 3, 2026 as a separate title from Counter-Strike 2, though the matchmaking servers remain offline. Additionally, the Xbox 360 console release was not updated, and Global Offensive remains playable there. Counter-Strike 2 received a mixed response from players, primarily as a result of removed content.

=== Gambling, third-party betting, and money laundering ===
Following the introduction of the Arms Deal update in August 2013, skins formed a virtual economy due to their rarity and other high-value factors that influenced their desirability. Due to this, the creation of a number of skin trading sites enabled by the Steamworks API were created. Some of these sites began to offer gambling functionality, allowing users to bet on the outcome of professional matches with skins. In June and July 2016, two formal lawsuits were filed against these gambling sites and Valve, stating that these encourage underage gambling and undisclosed promotion by some streamers. Valve in turn began to take steps to prevent these sites from using Steamworks for gambling purposes, and several of these sites ceased operating as a result. In July 2018, Valve disabled the opening of containers in Belgium and the Netherlands after their loot boxes appeared to violate Dutch and Belgian gambling laws.

In 2019, Valve made changes to Global Offensive's loot box mechanics due to a realization that "nearly all" of the trading on loot box keys was done by criminal organizations as a method of money laundering. Valve released a statement, saying, “In the past, most key trades we observed were between legitimate customers. However, worldwide fraud networks have recently shifted to using CS:GO keys to liquidate their gains. At this point, nearly all key purchases that end up being traded or sold on the marketplace are believed to be fraud-sourced. As a result, we have decided that newly purchased keys will not be tradeable or marketable.”

== Professional competition ==
Counter-Strike: Global Offensive Major Championships
- Sport: Esports
- Founded: 2013
- Folded: 2023 (Majors now held in CS2)
- No. of teams: 16 teams (2013–2017); 24 teams (2018–2023)
- Venue: Various
- Most titles: Astralis (Four)
- Broadcasters: Twitch, Steam.tv, YouTube
- Sponsor: Valve

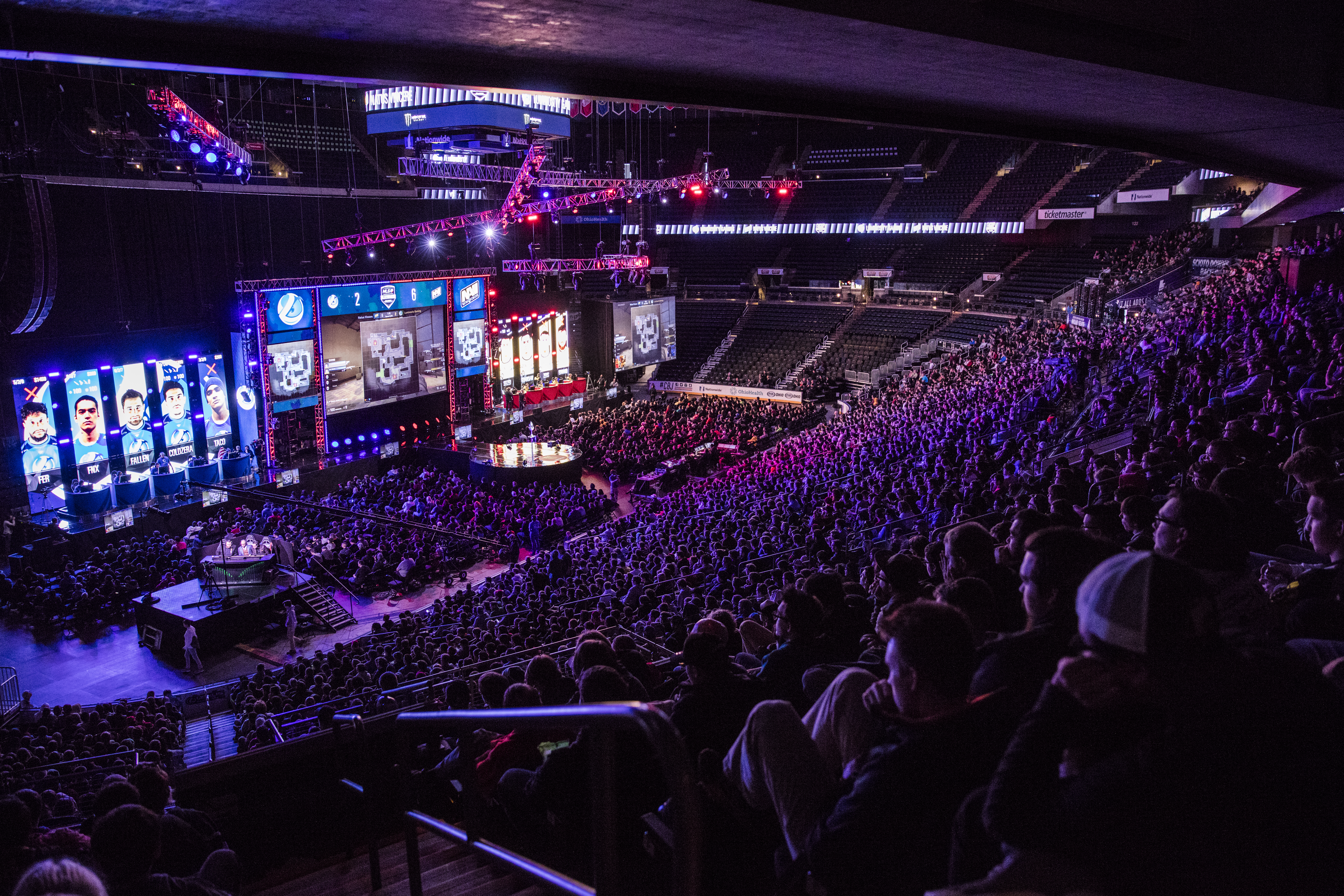
Luminosity Gaming competes against Natus Vincere at the MLG Columbus 2016 major.

Counter-Strike has one of the most popular esport scenes in the world. The Global Offensive professional scene consisted of leagues and tournaments hosted by third-party organizations, and Valve-sponsored tournaments known as Major Championships. Majors are considered the most prestigious tournaments in Counter-Strike circuit and have among the largest prize pools; originally announced at US$250,000, the prize pools for Majors have risen to US$1,000,000 since MLG Columbus 2016. Astralis was the most successful Global Offensive team of all time, with the core members of that team winning four Majors together. Professional Counter-Strike esports are now played in Counter-Strike 2

In 2014, the "first large match fixing scandal" in the Global Offensive community took place, where team iBuyPower purposefully lost a match against NetCodeGuides.com. The seven professional players that were involved in the scandal were permanently banned from all Majors by Valve, although some other organizers eventually allowed the players to compete at their tournaments.

In 2020, the Counter-Strike coaching bug scandal erupted, where team coaches used variants of a bug to see parts of the map they normally would not have access to and gather information about the enemy team. As of May 5, 2022, the Esports Integrity Commission announced that almost 100 coaches would be sanctioned as they neared the completion of the final investigation.

=== Media coverage ===
As the game and the scene grew in popularity, media companies, including WME/IMG and Turner Broadcasting, began to televise Global Offensive esports. The first significant television rights deal involved ELEAGUE Major 2017, held in the Fox Theatre and broadcast on US cable television network TBS in 2016. On August 22, 2018, Turner announced their further programming of Global Offensive with ELEAGUE’s Esports 101: CSGO and ELEAGUE CS:GO Premier 2018's docu-series on the TBS network.

== Reception ==
Reception

Aggregate score
| Aggregator | Score |
|---|---|
| Metacritic | PC: 83/100; PS3: 80/100; X360: 79/100 |

Review scores
| Publication | Score |
|---|---|
| Destructoid | PC: 9.5/10 |
| Eurogamer | PC: 9/10 |
| GameSpot | PC/PS3/X360: 8.5/10 |
| GameSpy | PC: 4/5 |
| IGN | PC: 8/10 |
| PC Gamer (US) | PC: 84% |

Counter-Strike: Global Offensive received generally positive reception from critics, according to review aggregator Metacritic. Since the game's release, Global Offensive has remained one of the most played and highest-grossing games on Steam. The game has remained very popular since release, reaching a new record of 1.4 million concurrent players in March 2023, surpassing the game's previous record of 1.3 million in April 2020 during the COVID-19 pandemic.

Reviewers praised Global Offensive's faithfulness to the previous game, Counter-Strike: Source, with Allistair Pinsof of Destructoid rating the game very highly and saying that Global Offensive is a "polished and better looking" version of the game. GameSpot writer Eric Neigher said in their review that this game stays true to its predecessors by adding much content, but tweaking small amounts and retaining their best features. The reviewers at gamesTM wrote in their review that the game stood "as a glowing reminder that quality game design is rewarded in longevity and variety." They also continued onto congratulate Valve that they had not only updated the popular game, but "had completely outclassed its contemporaries." Martin Gaston of VideoGamer.com wrote that although he was too old to truly enjoy the game, he believed that it was a "fine installment of one of the best games ever made," and that some people will experience "what will become the definitive moments of their gaming lives." Xav de Matos for Engadget wrote that for the price, "Global Offensive is a great extension to that legacy." Mitch Dyer from IGN said that "Global Offensive is definitely a Counter-Strike sequel – it looks and feels familiar, with minor tweaks here and there to help balance old issues and surprise longtime players."

Some of the features in the early releases of the game were criticized by reviewers. GameSpy's Mike Sharkey did not believe that the new content added was good or that there was much of it, and said that the Elo rating system seemed ineffective with many players of various skill levels all playing at once throughout the early days of release. Evan Lahti from PC Gamer noted that the majority of new official maps in Global Offensive were only for Arms Race or Demolition game modes, while Classic maps were only given "smart adjustments" to minor details. Pinsof thought that in its release state, it would not be the final version of the game. Paul Goodman said that for long-time fans of the series, Global Offensive will start to show the game's age, expressing that he "couldn't help but feel that I had been there and done that a dozen times before."

Although reviewers liked the console versions of the game, they believed there were obvious differences between the PC and console versions. Neigher believed that due to playing with thumbsticks and shoulder buttons "you definitely won't be getting the ultimate CS:GO experience." Ron Vorstermans for Gamer.nl said that the PC version is there to play at a higher competitive level, though he went on to say that the console versions are not inferior because of the PC's superiority for competition. Dyer wrote that the PlayStation 3 version was at an advantage to the Xbox version because of the ability to connect a keyboard and mouse to the system. He continued on to say that the user-interface on both of the consoles was as good as the PC one. Mark Langshaw of Digital Spy opined that although the game has support for the PlayStation Move, using it only makes the "already unforgiving game all the more challenging."

The game was nominated for "Best Spectator Game" in IGN's Best of 2017 Awards and for "eSports Game of the Year" at the 2017, 2018, and 2019 Golden Joystick Awards. The game won the fan-voted "eSports Game of the Year" award at The Game Awards 2015, and has been nominated for "Best Esports Game" at the 2017, 2019, 2020, 2021, and 2022 The Game Awards, and for "Game, eSports" at the 17th Annual National Academy of Video Game Trade Reviewers Awards. In 2018, the game was nominated for "Fan Favorite eSports Game" and "Fan Favorite eSports League Format" for the Majors at the Gamers' Choice Awards, and for "eSports Title of the Year" at the Australian Games Awards.
