= ESL (company) =

Esports organizer and production company

ESL Gaming GmbH
- Logo since 2019
- Formerly: Electronic Sports League
- Type: Private
- Industry: Esports
- Predecessor: Deutsche Clanliga
- Founded: 27 November 2000; 25 years ago
- Headquarters: Cologne, North Rhine-Westphalia
- Area served: Worldwide
- Key people: Ralf Reichert & Craig Levine (co-CEOs)
- Brands: DreamHack; Intel Extreme Masters
- Parent: Savvy Games Group
- Website: www.esl.com

ESL Gaming GmbH (formerly known as Electronic Sports League) is a German esports organizer and production company that produces video game competitions worldwide. ESL was the world's largest esports company in 2015, and the oldest that is still operational. Based in Cologne, North Rhine-Westphalia, ESL has eleven offices and multiple international TV studios globally. ESL is the largest esports company to broadcast on Twitch.

== History ==
Logo prior to February 2019

The Electronic Sports League was launched in 2000 as the successor to the Deutsche Clanliga, which was founded in 1997 by Jens Hilgers. The company began with an online gaming league and a gaming magazine. It also rented out servers for game competitions.

In 2015, ESL's Intel Extreme Masters Katowice was at the time, the most watched esports event in history. The event had more than 100,000 in attendance and Twitch viewership was over one million.

In July 2015, Modern Times Group (MTG) bought a 74 percent stake in ESL from its parent company, Turtle Entertainment, for $86 million. That same month, ESL announced its participation in "esports in Cinema," which would broadcast live esports events to over 1,500 movie theaters across the globe. Esports in Cinema included Dota 2 and Counter-Strike: Global Offensive coverage from ESL One Cologne 2015 and ESL One New York, as well as a documentary, "All Work All Play," which follows the rise of esports and highlights pro gamers as they work toward the Intel Extreme Masters World Championship.

After a player publicly admitted Adderall use following ESL One Katowice 2015, ESL worked with the National Anti-Doping Agency and the World Anti-Doping Agency to institute an anti-drug policy. It was the first international esports company to enforce anti-doping regulations. Random tests for the drugs prohibited by the World Anti-Doping Agency were implemented for its events. Punishments for the use of performance-enhancing drugs range from reduced prize money and tournament points to disqualification and a maximum two-year ban from ESL events.

ESL worked with publisher Valve in August 2015 for ESL One Cologne 2015 at the Lanxess Arena where 16 teams competed in Counter-Strike: Global Offensive. ESL implemented randomized drug testing at the event. All tests came back negative. The tournament had over 27 million viewers, making it the largest and most-watched CS:GO tournament at the time.

In October 2015, ESL held a Dota 2 championship at Madison Square Garden Theater. That same month, ESL partnered with ArenaNet to produce ESL Guild Wars 2 Pro League, which was one of seven official ESL Pro Leagues.

ESL held its 10th arena event in November 2015 at the SAP Center in San Jose, California. The event had over 10 million viewers on Twitch and was the largest Counter-Strike event in America at that time. ESL partnered with Activision for the 2016 Call of Duty World League for the World League's Pro Division.

In November 2015, ESL announced its acquisition of the E-Sports Entertainment Association (ESEA), promoters of the ESEA League, after previous collaborations: ESL uses the ESEA anti-cheat system for the ESL CS:GO Pro League. The ESEA platform is used for ESL events as well as offline finals. As of July 2016, ESL became a member of the Esports Integrity Coalition (ESIC), a non-profit members' association to maintain integrity in professional esports. In 2017, ESL partnered with Mercedes-Benz for Hamburg DOTA 2 Major.

In 2017, ESL partnered with Hulu to produce four esports series (Player v. Player, Bootcamp, Defining Moments and ESL Replay).

In March 2021, ESL announced a partnership with 1xBet. On 28 April 2021, Intel and ESL renewed their partnership again in a three-year contract, which will see the two companies invest US$100,000,000 in esports, throughout 2024.

=== Acquisition by SGG and merger with FACEIT ===
In 2022, it was announced that ESL and esports platform FACEIT were being acquired for a combined US$1.5 billion by Savvy Games Group (SGG), a holding company owned by Saudi Arabia's Public Investment Fund. The ESL purchase is worth $1.05 billion, while the FACEIT deal is worth $500 million; both deals are expected to close in the second quarter of 2022, subject to regulatory approval. As part of the acquisition, ESL and FACEIT are set to merge and form the ESL FaceIt Group. The new company will be headed by ESL CEO Craig Levine and FACEIT CEO Niccolo Maisto, while ESL co-founder Ralf Reichert will serve as executive chairman.

== Competitions ==
ESL hosts competitions around the globe, partnering with publishers such as Blizzard Entertainment, Riot Games, Valve, Microsoft, Wargaming and multiple others to facilitate thousands of gaming competitions annually. ESL competitors are supported on both national and international levels. Some of their more notable competitions include the following:

=== ESL Play ===
ESL Play is an esports platform that provides tournaments and ladders across all games and skill levels. ESL Open, the first cup on the league ladder, is open to everyone, including beginners. ESL Major competitions have entry requirements, and winning on this level is required to earn a spot in ESL Pro competition. However, ESL Major also contains Go4 Cups, which are free tournaments open to everyone. Tournaments at this level require prior qualification.

=== ESL National Championships ===
ESL National Championships were region-specific ESL Pro competitions held in various countries. ESL Meisterschaft, the German championship, began in 2002 and is the oldest esports league in existence. The ESL UK Premiership, another regional esports program, has been ESL's largest regional tournament since 2010. National Championships were established to spread local esports competition around the world.

ESL National Championships were held for Battlefield 4, Counter-Strike, Dota 2, Halo, Hearthstone, Heroes of the Storm, Mortal Kombat, Smite, StarCraft II, World of Tanks, and Rainbow Six.

On 15 September 2023, ESL announced that they would be ending all National Championships by the beginning of 2024. ESL Meisterschaft: Autumn 2023 was the final tournament to be played, which ended on 16 December 2023.

=== ESL Pro Tour ===
The ESL Pro Tour is a year-round circuit that uses a ranking system for qualification to a major championship event.

As of 2020, ESL hosts three titles for the ESL Pro Tour: Counter-Strike, StarCraft II and Warcraft III. The two major championship events for those titles are IEM Katowice 2021 (for the three titles) and ESL One Cologne 2020 (for Counter-Strike only).

Due to the COVID-19 pandemic, ESL One Cologne was held online in August 2020.

In 2023, ESL Pro Tour hosted tournaments for three titles: Counter-Strike: Global Offensive, Dota 2, and StarCraft II.

For Counter-Strike: Global Offensive, key events include IEM Katowice 2023, IEM Spring 2023, IEM Dallas 2023, IEM Cologne 2023, and the ESL Pro Tour CS:GO in Sydney.

For Dota 2, major tournaments include DreamLeague Season 19, DreamLeague Season 20, DreamLeague Season 21 and the Riyadh Masters. Notably, the Riyadh Masters is the third-largest esports tournament in terms of prize money, following the Fortnite World Championship and The International.

=== ESL One ===
ESL One logo

ESL One refers to premier offline tournaments across a variety of games, like Counter-Strike: Global Offensive and Dota 2, and are usually considered among the most prestigious events for each game. ESL One events are often selected to be part of the Valve-sponsored CS:GO Major series. The ESL Counter-Strike Majors have been: EMS One Katowice 2014, ESL One Cologne 2014, ESL One Katowice 2015, ESL One Cologne 2015, ESL One Cologne 2016, IEM Katowice 2019. ESL were originally set to host a major in Rio de Janeiro in 2020 under the ESL One brand, until the event was cancelled as a result of the COVID-19 pandemic. After 2020, the CS:GO event of ESL One was merged into IEM brand. As of November 2022, ESL has hosted seven of the eighteen CS:GO Major tournaments, while the last one was IEM Rio Major 2022.

=== ESL Impact League ===
ESL Impact League was launched in 2022 to promote women's Counter-Strike: Global Offensive around the world, and is often held simultaneously with other ESL tournaments such as IEM and ESL Challengers. In 2022, 3 LAN tournaments were held in Dallas, Valencia and Jönköping. It was announced in October 2025 that ESL would suspend the circuit upon the conclusion of its 8th season, citing concerns of sustainability.

=== Intel Extreme Masters ===
IEM logo

The Intel Extreme Masters is the world's longest-running global esports tournament series.

=== DreamHack ===
After DreamHack merged with ESL in 2020, the DreamHack Open CS:GO events were renamed to ESL Challengers, the DreamHack Masters events were discontinued. The StarCraft II events retained the DreamHack name.

== ESL Technology ==
ESL created the ESL Wire Anti Cheat software to combat online cheating in the increasingly competitive field. In 2015, ESL enhanced its tournament software by integrating Wargaming's "Battle API" into its tournaments. The API makes player and game data available through the API application. That same year, ESL released ESL Matchmaking which uses ESL's API to match competitors based on skill. Microsoft worked with ESL to create an Xbox app to use the ESL tournament system through Xbox Live on Xbox One in 2016.

== AnyKey ==
AnyKey is a diversity initiative created by ESL and Intel to include underrepresented members of the gaming community in competitions including women, LGBT people and people of color. AnyKey is made up of two teams for research and implementation. AnyKey has researched and implemented a code of conduct, which aims to address an inclusion policy for esports events and online broadcasts and the harassment issues underrepresented populations face. It has also created and hosted women's tournaments. The two teams continue to research and implement inclusion in the gaming community.
