= Duncan Shields =

British esports journalist and analyst

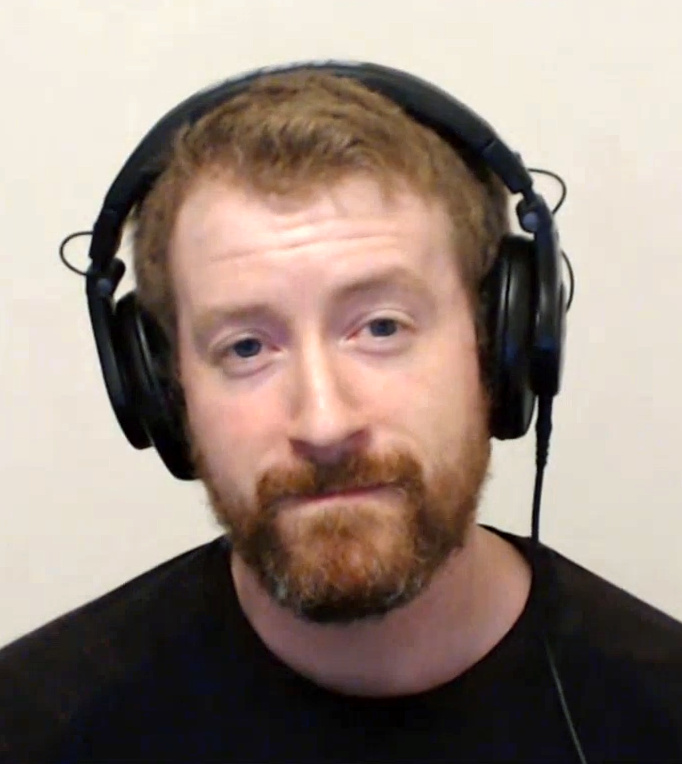
- Shields in 2017
- Other names: Thorin, The Esports Historian
- Occupations: Esports journalist, analyst, broadcaster
- Years active: 2001–present
- Known for: Reflections interview series, Summoning Insight, The Four Horsemen, former editor-in-chief of SK Gaming
- Website: esportshistorian.gg

Duncan "Thorin" Shields is a British esports journalist, analyst, and broadcaster, often referred to as "The Esports Historian" for his extensive knowledge of competitive gaming history. He has been active in esports journalism since 2001 and has worked across Counter-Strike, StarCraft, Quake, and League of Legends. He is the creator of the Reflections long-form interview series and co-host of the Summoning Insight podcast. Shields is a co-founder and part owner of Last Free Nation, an esports content creation network he launched alongside esports executive Christopher "MonteCristo" Mykles.

== Career ==
=== Journalism ===
Shields began writing about esports in 2001 for Pro-Cybernews, subsequently moving to Gamers.nu in April 2002. He went on to serve as editor-in-chief of SK Gaming from September 2009 to May 2012. In December 2013 he joined OnGamers as a senior esports content creator, departing in October 2014.

Shields has been noted for long-form historical writing and player profiles, specialising in Counter-Strike, Quake, StarCraft, and League of Legends. His written work includes extensive retrospectives and ranked lists of the greatest players in Counter-Strike history, which became widely cited reference points within the esports community. He co-authored two guides to competitive Counter-Strike, TAO-CS and TAO-fRoD, alongside professional players Rambo, steel, and fRoD.

In 2019, Shields gave a presentation at the Inven Global Esports Conference (IGEC) entitled "Online Journalism: A View of the Esports Journalism Landscape from the Trenches", in which he traced the history of esports media from the early 2000s through the dot-com crash to 2019.

In February 2025, Shields published an extended video investigation into the career and conduct of League of Legends professional player Rekkles, entitled "Rekkles Is a Narcissistic Diva and a Terrible Team-Mate", drawing on interviews with unnamed former teammates, coaches, and organisation staff. The video prompted public responses from Rekkles himself, several of his former teammates, and T1's CEO Joe Marsh, who defended Rekkles' character.

=== Broadcasting ===
Shields has served as a studio analyst at more than 60 esports events worldwide, working for broadcasters including ELEAGUE, ESL, MLG, DreamHack, PGL, StarLadder, FACEIT, and BLAST.

He is the creator of two long-form video interview series. Grilled ran from June 2012 to November 2013, featuring in-depth one-on-one interviews with esports competitors and community figures past and present. It was succeeded by Reflections, which continued the same format and expanded its scope across multiple esports titles. He is also the creator of Thorin's Thoughts, a long-running video commentary series covering esports news, history, and analysis, which surpassed 1,700 published episodes.

In October 2022, Shields co-founded Last Free Nation, a talent-owned esports media network, alongside Christopher "MonteCristo" Mykles. The network hosts several podcasts, including Summoning Insight, a League of Legends esports podcast co-hosted with Jakob "YamatoCannon" Mebdi, and The Four Horsemen, co-hosted with Mykles and Richard Lewis.

=== Awards ===
Shields won the Cadred/Heaven Media Esports Journalist of the Year award in both 2012 and 2013. In 2017 he won the Esports Awards Journalist of the Year.

=== Controversies ===
==== IEM Katowice 2014 ====
In 2014, Shields was removed from the broadcast team for the Intel Extreme Masters World Championship in Katowice, Poland, after making remarks on a podcast in which he described Poland as "one of the worst countries in Europe" and compared hosting the event there to the Olympic Games being held in Africa. ESL stated it did not "stand by or tolerate acts of racism, xenophobia or other forms of discrimination" and cited the offence caused to "the entire Polish production team that he was going to be a part of."

==== Alex Jones comments (2018) ====
In 2018, Shields attracted criticism after publicly defending Alex Jones, the American conspiracy theorist known for promoting false claims about the Sandy Hook Elementary School shooting. Vice reported on the remarks and noted that ESL, when contacted, reiterated that Shields worked for the organisation on a freelance basis rather than as a permanent employee.

==== m0e slur defence (2018) ====
Also in 2018, Shields drew widespread criticism within the esports community after defending streamer Mohamed "m0e" Assad's use of an anti-gay slur, for which Assad had received a Twitch ban. Shields argued that the word "is not and has never been explicitly or solely homophobic in meaning." He continued to work as an analyst at ESL One Cologne during the controversy. Newsweek reported on the incident, noting public criticism from several prominent members of the esports and gaming community.

==== ESL Pro League dispute (2020) ====
In 2020, Shields publicly announced he would cease working with ESL in any capacity, describing their handling of the ESL Pro League Season 11 format change, which reduced the number of participating teams from 48 to 24, as "unethical and unprofessional." He stated he would not work with the organisation "until the people responsible are named and fired or leave the company."
