= Jonas Jerebko =

Swedish basketball player (born 1987)

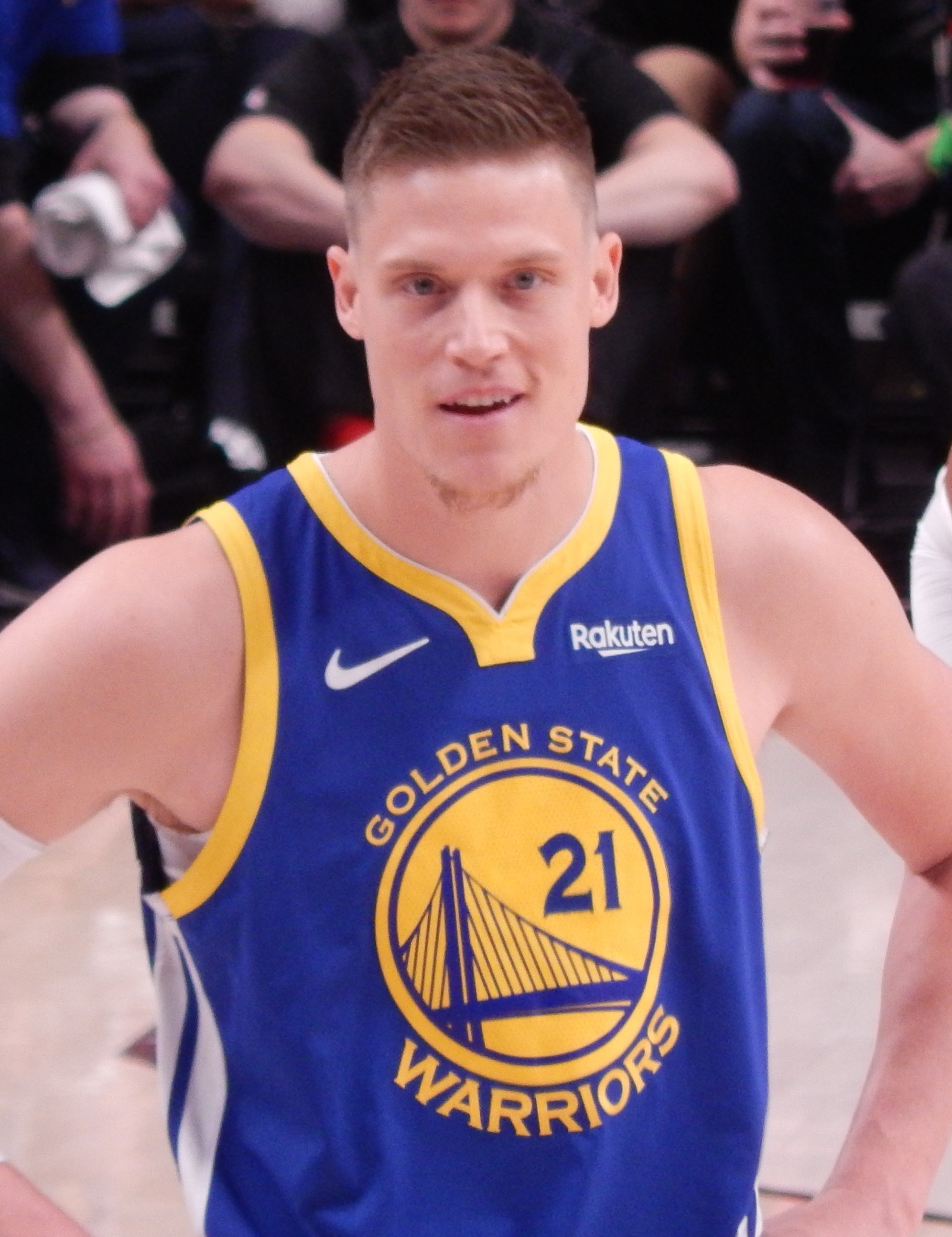
- Jerebko in 2019

Personal information
- Born: March 2, 1987 (age 39) Kinna, Sweden
- Listed height: 6 ft 10 in (2.08 m)
- Listed weight: 231 lb (105 kg)

Career information
- NBA draft: 2009: 2nd round, 39th overall pick
- Drafted by: Detroit Pistons
- Playing career: 2005–2024
- Position: Power forward
- Number: 33, 8, 21, 11, 32

Career history
- 2005–2006: Borås Basket
- 2006–2007: Plannja Basket
- 2007–2009: Angelico Biella
- 2009–2015: Detroit Pistons
- 2015–2017: Boston Celtics
- 2017–2018: Utah Jazz
- 2018–2019: Golden State Warriors
- 2019–2021: Khimki Moscow
- 2022: CSKA Moscow
- 2024: Santeros de Aguada

Career highlights
- NBA All-Rookie Second Team (2010); Swedish Basketball League champion (2007)
- Stats at NBA.com
- Stats at Basketball Reference

rebko

Personal information
- Name: Jonas Jerebko

Current team
- Team: Renegades
- Game: Counter-Strike: Global Offensive

Career information
- Playing career: 2016–present

Team history
- 2016: Renegades

Jonas Jerebko (Swedish pronunciation: [ˈjuːnas jɛˈrɛbːkʊ]; born March 2, 1987) is a Swedish former professional basketball player. He was selected as the 39th overall pick in the second round of the 2009 NBA draft by the Detroit Pistons, becoming the second Swedish-born basketball player (after Miles Simon) to be selected in the NBA draft. Jerebko played a total of 10 seasons in the NBA with four different teams, the Detroit Pistons, Boston Celtics, Utah Jazz and Golden State Warriors.

== Early life ==
As a child growing up in Sweden, Jerebko was involved in many sports, but he excelled at basketball. Having parents who played basketball was good for Jerebko because there was very little interest in the game among his friends. He moved to Massachusetts during his senior year for a better opportunity. He attended Norwood High School for his senior year and would impress on the court, receiving a few different offers.

In 2005, Jerebko signed to play basketball at the University at Buffalo in his father's hometown. Ultimately, he gave up a basketball scholarship for a professional career.

== Professional career ==
=== Europe (2005–2009) ===
Jerebko began his career playing with second-tiered Swedish club Borås Basket in the 2005–06 season before joining first-tiered Swedish club Plannja Basket for the 2006–07 season. He averaged 20.0 points, 11.6 rebounds and 2.6 blocks in 19 games for Borås, and 10.0 points and 5.0 rebounds in 22 games for Plannja.

In 2007, Jerebko moved to Italy where he joined Angelico Biella, playing for the club for two seasons.

=== Detroit Pistons (2009–2015) ===
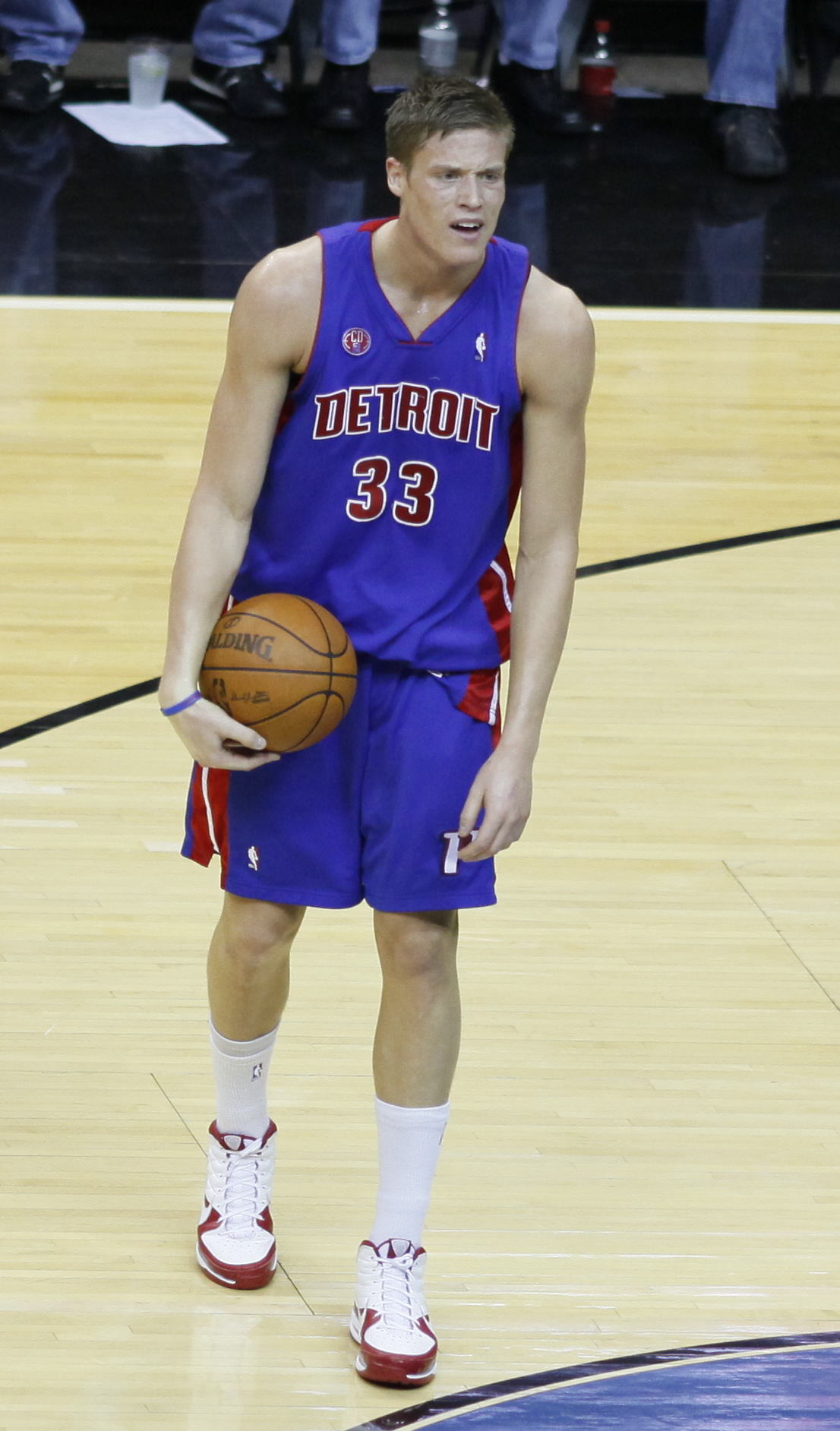
Jerebko with the Pistons in 2009

In May 2009, ESPN analyst Fran Fraschilla considered Jerebko one of the top five European prospects in the 2009 NBA draft. He was subsequently selected with the 39th overall pick by the Detroit Pistons, becoming the second Swedish national player to be selected in the NBA after the Swedish-born American Miles Simon. His career in the NBA got off to a rough-and-tumble start; in a preseason game, Jerebko was accused of punching Miami Heat center Jamaal Magloire in the face. Both players were suspended for the opening game of the regular season game for the ensuing fight. Jerebko's hustle and determination early on in 2009–10 made him a fan favorite. He was selected as a member of the Rookie Team as part of the 2010 Rookie Challenge and Youth Jam during the NBA All-Star Weekend. He appeared in 80 games (73 starts) for the Pistons as a rookie, averaging 9.3 points (.481 FG, .313 3FG), 6.0 rebounds, 0.7 assists and 0.99 steals in 27.9 minutes per game. He was among NBA rookie leaders ranked third in rebounds, fourth in blocks (0.36 bpg), fifth in minutes (27.9 mpg), eighth in steals, 10th in scoring and tied for 18th in assists. His 73 games as a starter ranks second in franchise history amongst rookies behind Kelly Tripucka who started all 82 games during the 1981–82 season.

On October 5, 2010, Jerebko strained his right Achilles' tendon in a preseason game against the Miami Heat. He subsequently missed the entire 2010–11 season.

On December 9, 2011, Jerebko re-signed with the Pistons on a four-year, $16 million deal.

=== Boston Celtics (2015–2017) ===
On February 19, 2015, Jerebko was traded, along with Luigi Datome, to the Boston Celtics in exchange for Tayshaun Prince.

On July 9, 2015, Jerebko re-signed with the Celtics.

=== Utah Jazz (2017–2018) ===
On July 17, 2017, Jerebko signed with the Utah Jazz. On July 7, 2018, he was waived by the Jazz.

=== Golden State Warriors (2018–2019) ===
On July 12, 2018, Jerebko signed with the Golden State Warriors. On October 19, he tipped in a shot against his former team with 0.3 seconds remaining to lift the Warriors to a 124–123 victory over the Jazz. On November 13, he posted his 11th career double-double with season bests of 14 points and 14 rebounds in a 110–103 win over the Atlanta Hawks. On December 22, he scored a career-high 23 points on 10-for-12 shooting with six rebounds in 21 minutes off the bench in a 120–116 win over the Dallas Mavericks. The Warriors made it to the 2019 NBA Finals, where they were defeated by the Toronto Raptors in six games.

=== Khimki (2019–2021) ===
On August 14, 2019, Jerebko signed with Khimki of the VTB United League and the EuroLeague. On January 23, 2021, Khimki terminated his contract, reportedly for personal reasons.

=== CSKA Moscow (2022) ===
On March 30, 2022, Jerebko signed with CSKA Moscow for the rest of the season. The news of the signing, which occurred one month after the start of the Russian invasion of Ukraine, was met with widespread criticism in his home country Sweden. He was swiftly suspended from the Sweden national team, and at least one of his main sponsors terminated his contract. On June 18, 2022, Jerebko left CSKA Moscow.

=== Santeros de Aguada (2024) ===
On March 13, 2024, Jerebko signed with the Santeros de Aguada. On April 9, he left the team after an injury.

== Career statistics ==
Legend
GP	Games played	GS	Games started	MPG	Minutes per game
FG%	Field-goal percentage	3P%	3-point field-goal percentage	FT%	Free-throw percentage
RPG	Rebounds per game	APG	Assists per game	SPG	Steals per game
BPG	Blocks per game	PPG	Points per game	PIR	Performance index rating
**Bold**	Career high

=== NBA ===
==== Regular season ====
Year	Team	GP	GS	MPG	FG%	3P%	FT%	RPG	APG	SPG	BPG	PPG
2009–10	Detroit	**80**	**73**	**27.9**	**.481**	.313	.710	**6.0**	.7	**1.0**	**.4**	**9.3**
2011–12	Detroit	64	13	22.9	.468	.302	.806	4.8	.7	.6	.3	8.7
2012–13	Detroit	49	2	18.2	.449	.301	.773	3.8	.9	.8	.2	7.7
2013–14	Detroit	64	0	11.6	.471	**.419**	.729	2.7	.6	.3	.1	4.2
2014–15	Detroit	46	0	15.3	.460	.368	**.861**	3.1	.9	.6	.2	5.2
2014–15	Boston	29	0	18.2	.431	.406	.833	4.8	1.0	.7	.2	7.1
2015–16	Boston	78	0	15.1	.413	.398	.782	3.7	.8	.3	.3	4.4
2016–17	Boston	78	6	15.8	.435	.346	.703	3.5	.9	.3	.2	3.8
2017–18	Utah	74	19	15.3	.466	.414	.807	3.3	.6	.3	.2	5.8
2018–19	Golden State	73	6	16.7	.459	.367	.800	3.9	**1.3**	.4	.2	6.3
Career		635	119	17.8	.457	.363	.770	4.0	.8	.5	.2	6.2

==== Playoffs ====
Year	Team	GP	GS	MPG	FG%	3P%	FT%	RPG	APG	SPG	BPG	PPG
2015	Boston	4	0	17.0	.333	.000	.500	3.5	.3	**.5**	.3	2.8
2016	Boston	6	**4**	**27.0**	.478	.318	.800	**6.8**	**1.7**	.3	**.7**	**9.2**
2017	Boston	12	0	10.7	**.484**	**.333**	**1.000**	2.4	1.0	.4	.3	3.6
2018	Utah	10	0	7.9	.421	.167	**1.000**	1.6	.3	.3	.0	1.9
2019	Golden State	**16**	0	7.6	.286	.263	.833	2.1	.8	.1	.1	2.1
Career		48	4	11.6	.405	.273	.870	2.8	.8	.3	.2	3.4

=== EuroLeague ===
*	Led the league

Year	Team	GP	GS	MPG	FG%	3P%	FT%	RPG	APG	SPG	BPG	PPG	PIR
2019–20	Khimki	**28***	14	23.7	**.525**	**.424**	.818	4.7	**1.7**	**.8**	.4	11.2	**12.8**
2020–21	Khimki	15	**15**	**26.1**	.470	.404	**.828**	**5.5**	1.6	.2	**.5**	**11.5**	12.0
Career		43	29	24.5	.504	.415	.821	5.0	1.7	.6	.4	11.3	12.5

== National team career ==
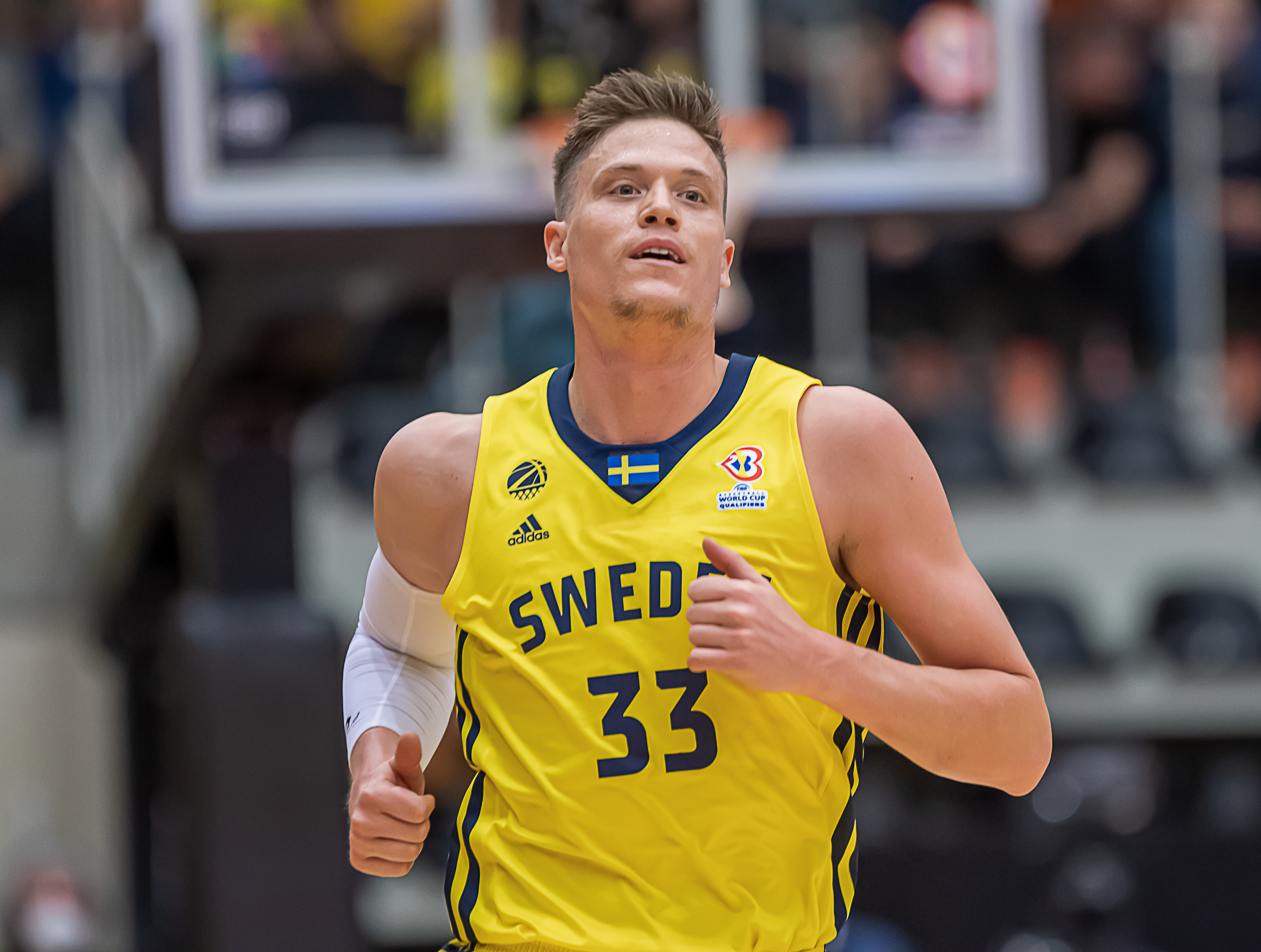
Jerebko playing for Sweden in 2022

Jerebko debuted for the Swedish national team as an 18-year-old, and has since played for them at the 2013 EuroBasket, 2022 EuroBasket qualifiers, and 2023 World Cup qualifiers. Following his decision of joining CSKA Moscow in the spring of 2022, Jerebko was expelled by the Swedish national team.

== Personal life ==
Jerebko is the son of former Syracuse forward Chris Jerebko, a Russian American who played professionally in Sweden with Borås Basket for five seasons before settling in that country. His mother also played basketball professionally.

Jerebko and his wife Johanna have two daughters and a son.

On August 26, 2016, Jerebko purchased the Renegades esports organization from Chris Badawi and Christopher "MonteCristo" Mykles.

== See also ==
- List of European basketball players in the United States
