= Richard Lewis (journalist) =

British esports journalist and broadcaster

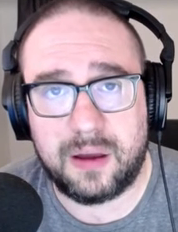
- Richard Lewis in 2018
- Born: Wales, United Kingdom
- Other name: Dr. Gonzo
- Occupations: Esports journalist, broadcaster
- Known for: The Richard Lewis Show, By The Numbers, The Four Horsemen, investigative esports journalism, former desk host of ELEAGUE
- Website: richardlewis.substack.com

Richard Lewis is a British esports journalist and broadcaster from Wales. He has been active in esports media since the early 2000s, beginning in the Counter-Strike: Source scene before becoming one of the most prominent investigative journalists in competitive gaming. His reporting has broken several major stories, including the iBUYPOWER match-fixing scandal in 2015, the undisclosed ownership of the CS:GO skin gambling site CSGOShuffle by streamer PhantomL0rd in 2016, and evidence that contributed to an FBI-assisted match-fixing investigation into the North American MDL in 2021. He also conducted the interview with former Ninjas in Pyjamas player Fifflaren that led to the resignation of the organisation's CEO.

As a broadcaster, Lewis served as desk host of ELEAGUE from 2016 to 2018, and hosted both the PGL Major Stockholm 2021 and the PGL Major Copenhagen 2024. He served as editor-at-large of Dexerto from 2020 to 2023, and co-hosts The Four Horsemen podcast alongside Duncan "Thorin" Shields and Christopher "MonteCristo" Mykles through the Last Free Nation media network.

Lewis has won the Esports Journalist of the Year award three times (2016, 2019, and 2023), becoming the first person to win the award on three occasions, and received a Lifetime Achievement Award from the Esports Industry Awards in 2020.

== Career ==
=== Early career ===
Lewis began writing about esports through a blog focused on the Counter-Strike: Source scene, before contributing to outlets including Cadred (later Esports Heaven), Tek-9, and eSports Heaven over a period of six years. He subsequently joined The Daily Dot as a senior esports correspondent, writing on competitive gaming across Counter-Strike, League of Legends, and other titles. He also contributed technology and esports articles to Breitbart News during this period.

=== Journalism ===
In January 2015, Lewis broke the story of the iBUYPOWER match-fixing scandal, reporting that professional players from iBUYPOWER had deliberately lost a CEVO Season 5 league match against NetcodeGuides.com on 20 August 2014 in exchange for in-game skins of significant monetary value. The investigation had taken Lewis several months to compile sufficient evidence. Valve permanently banned seven individuals from all Valve-sponsored tournaments on 26 January 2015, including iBUYPOWER players Sam "DaZeD" Marine, Joshua "steel" Nissan, Braxton "swag" Pierce, and Kévin "AZK" Larivière, as well as Derek "dBoorn" Boorn and Duc "cud" Pham, who had coordinated the betting arrangement. The bans remained in place for ten years; in January 2025, Valve permitted the four iBUYPOWER players to once again participate in Valve-sponsored events.

In July 2016, Lewis published an investigation revealing that Twitch streamer James "PhantomL0rd" Varga was the undisclosed co-owner of CS:GO skin gambling site CSGOShuffle, which he heavily promoted to his audience of nearly 1.4 million followers. Based on Skype logs obtained from a third party, Lewis's report showed Varga communicating with site staff about betting odds and referring to the operation as "us", indicating ownership he had not disclosed to viewers. Varga was permanently banned from Twitch following the publication of the report. Valve subsequently issued cease-and-desist letters against CS:GO gambling websites, preventing them from using Counter-Strike intellectual property.

In 2019, Lewis interviewed former Ninjas in Pyjamas CS:GO player Robin "Fifflaren" Johansson, in which Johansson alleged that NiP had failed to pay him and several teammates,including GeT_RiGhT, f0rest, and Xizt,prize money owed from tournament victories in 2013. The interview prompted corroborating statements from Friberg and Xizt. Following the publication, NiP's then-CEO stepped down from the role. An independent report by the Esports Integrity Coalition subsequently found Fifflaren's core complaint about unpaid prize money to be valid, whilst clearing current NiP management of active wrongdoing.

In 2015, Lewis reported that moderators of the League of Legends subreddit had signed non-disclosure agreements with the game's developer Riot Games and received free promotional merchandise from the company, despite public statements that the subreddit operated independently of Riot. Several former moderators had also been subsequently hired by the company. A month later, a moderator announced that Lewis's content had been indefinitely banned from the subreddit following alleged harassment of Reddit users by Lewis's followers. Lewis disputed the allegations, stating he had not directed his Twitter followers to harass anyone.

In 2017, Lewis published evidence of potential match-fixing in semi-professional CS:GO, extending his investigative coverage beyond the professional tier. In early 2021, Lewis received a covertly made audio recording of three North American players,Sebastian "retchy" Tropiano, Carson "nosraC" O'Reilly, and Kevin "4pack" Przypasniak,discussing plans to deliberately lose matches in ESEA MDL Season 35. Lewis provided the recording to the Esports Integrity Commission (ESIC), whose commissioner Ian Smith subsequently confirmed the organisation was working with the FBI, which had recently formed a dedicated sports betting investigation unit, to investigate organised match-fixing across the North American MDL tier. The investigation identified two distinct groups: players who bet on their own losses opportunistically, and players who had been bribed by outside betting syndicates to fix matches in an organised fashion.

In September 2020, Lewis was appointed the first editor-at-large of Dexerto. In 2022, Lewis broke the story that a former TSM League of Legends coach, Peter Zhang, had solicited payments from prospective players in exchange for guaranteeing their place on the team's roster. An independent investigation by the law firm Simpson Thacher & Bartlett LLP subsequently confirmed the misconduct. Later that year, Lewis also reported that TSM was considering selling their franchised LCS slot, which they subsequently did in 2023.

In March 2023, Lewis broke the news that Counter-Strike 2 was in development and would be released imminently, ahead of any official announcement from Valve. The story was subsequently confirmed and reported by The Verge. Lewis resigned from Dexerto the same month, citing creative differences.

=== Broadcasting ===
In late 2015, broadcasting conglomerate Turner announced it would launch a Counter-Strike: Global Offensive professional league, ELEAGUE, to be broadcast weekly on the American television channel TBS. Lewis was invited to serve as desk host for the league in 2016. In April 2018, Lewis announced he would be leaving ELEAGUE as its full-time host to pursue other opportunities after two years with the organisation.

In October and November 2021, Lewis served as desk host of the PGL Major Stockholm 2021, the first CS:GO Major since the start of the COVID-19 pandemic.

In October 2022, Lewis became a contributor to Last Free Nation, a talent-owned esports media network co-founded by Christopher "MonteCristo" Mykles and Duncan "Thorin" Shields. Through the network, Lewis co-hosts The Four Horsemen podcast with Mykles and Shields.

In March 2024, Lewis served as desk host for the PGL Major Copenhagen 2024, the first major tournament held for Counter-Strike 2.

=== Podcasts ===
From May 2015, Lewis co-hosted By The Numbers: CS:GO, a weekly Counter-Strike podcast, alongside Duncan "Thorin" Shields. The podcast ran until April 2016 and was later revived as Return of By The Numbers in August 2017. Lewis also hosts The Richard Lewis Show, a podcast covering esports affairs.

=== Other activities ===
In July 2018, ESP Gaming announced that Lewis would serve as Director of Talent for the World Showdown of Esports (WSOE), overseeing on-air personalities for the multi-genre tournament series.

In autumn 2021, Lewis began teaching an online course in esports integrity at the University of New Haven, as part of the university's Master's in Esports Business programme. He co-taught the course alongside Declan Hill, a specialist in sports corruption and match-fixing.

=== Awards ===
In 2016, Lewis was awarded Esports Journalist of the Year by the Esports Industry Awards. He won the award again in 2019; in his acceptance speech, Lewis criticised gaming outlets including Kotaku and Polygon for gatekeeping within the games industry. In 2020, Lewis received a Lifetime Achievement Award from the Esports Industry Awards. In 2023, Lewis won Esports Journalist of the Year for a third time, becoming the first person to win the award on three occasions.

== Controversies ==
=== DreamHack Winter 2015 altercation ===
In November 2015 at DreamHack Winter 2015, police were called following a physical altercation between Lewis and Alliance Dota 2 player Jonathan "Loda" Berg. Berg claimed on social media that Lewis had strangled him; Lewis stated he had acted defensively after feeling threatened when Berg approached him backstage. Lewis told PC Gamer he had apologised to Berg, and police confirmed an assault had been reported but that no charges were filed. DreamHack stated that Berg had "aggressively approached" Lewis, and that whilst both parties were yelling, Lewis had initiated physical contact by grabbing Berg's neck. Although DreamHack intended to remove both parties from the event, they were permitted to stay after apologising to each other. DreamHack subsequently announced it would not work with Lewis again, stating: "We cannot condone violent behavior at our events."

=== League of Legends subreddit ban (2015) ===
Following Lewis's 2015 reports on the relationship between Riot Games and the League of Legends subreddit moderation team, a subreddit moderator announced that Lewis's content had been indefinitely banned from the community after alleged harassment of Reddit users by his followers. Lewis disputed the allegations, arguing he had never directed his followers to target Reddit users.

== Personal life ==
Lewis was a close friend and roommate of Maria "Remilia" Creveling, the first woman and first transgender person to compete in the League Championship Series, with whom he shared a home in Las Vegas. Creveling died in her sleep on 27 December 2019 at the age of 24. Lewis was the first to publicly announce her death, writing on Twitter: "It is with great sadness that I inform you that my best friend Maria Creveling passed away peacefully in her sleep yesterday. Her absence will leave a void that can never be filled."
