= ELEAGUE Major: Boston 2018 =

Video game competition

ELEAGUE Major 2018
- 2018
- The ELEAGUE Major 2018 logo

Tournament information
- Sport: Counter-Strike: Global Offensive
- Location: Atlanta, Georgia, United States; Boston, Massachusetts, United States
- Dates: January 12, 2018–January 28, 2018
- Administrator: Valve; ELEAGUE
- Tournament format(s): Two 16 team swiss-system group stages 8 team single-elimination playoff
- Venue: Agganis Arena
- Teams: 24 (one withdrew)
- Purse: $1,000,000 USD

Final positions
- Champions: Cloud9 (1st title)
- 1st runners-up: FaZe Clan
- 2nd runners-up: Natus Vincere; SK Gaming
- MVP: Tarik "tarik" Celik

The ELEAGUE Major: Boston 2018, also known as ELEAGUE Major 2018 or Boston 2018, was the twelfth Counter-Strike: Global Offensive Major Championship and the second organized by ELEAGUE. The group stage was held in Atlanta, Georgia, United States from January 12 to January 22, 2018, and the playoff stage took place at the Agganis Arena in Boston, Massachusetts, United States from January 26 to January 28, 2018. It featured 24 professional teams from around the world, as ELEAGUE and Valve agreed to expand the Major from the usual 16. All 16 teams from the previous major, PGL Major: Kraków 2017, directly qualified for the Major, while another eight teams qualified through their respective regional qualifiers. Boston 2018 was the fifth consecutive Major with a prize pool of $1,000,000. This was also the first CS:GO Major to take place in two cities.

SK Gaming and Fnatic were the only entering Legends to advance to the playoff stage and retain their Legend status: the fewest in Major history. The two teams continued their respective streaks of making the playoffs at all Majors attended, with Fnatic's run starting at Dreamhack Winter 2013 and SK Gaming's run starting at ESL One Katowice 2015 as Keyd Stars. The new Legends at Boston 2018 were FaZe Clan, G2 Esports, Natus Vincere, Quantum Bellator Fire, Cloud9, and mousesports. Defending champions Gambit Esports, along with 100 Thieves (formerly Immortals), Astralis, BIG, North, and Virtus.pro, lost their Legend status. This marked the first time in Major history that Astralis's core – Nicolai "dev1ce" Reedtz, Peter "dupreeh" Rothmann, and Andreas "Xyp9x" Højsleth – did not make the playoffs. This left Olof "olofmeister" Kajbjer of FaZe Clan and Freddy "KRIMZ" Johansson of Fnatic the two remaining players to have been Legends at all twelve majors.

The grand finals featured FaZe Clan, the favorite to win the tournament, and Cloud9, the second North American team to reach a Major final. FaZe defeated mousesports and Natus Vincere to reach the finals, while Cloud9 pulled off two upsets with wins against G2 Esports and SK Gaming. Cloud9 etched out the win over FaZe Clan to become the first North American team to win a Major. It would also mark just the fourth time in CS:GO history in which a North American team won a premier international event, after iBUYPOWER winning the ESEA Global Finals Season 15, Cloud9 winning ESL Pro League Season 4, and OpTic Gaming winning ELEAGUE Season 2.

== Background ==
Counter-Strike: Global Offensive (CS:GO) is a multiplayer first-person shooter video game developed by Hidden Path Entertainment and Valve. It is the fourth game in the Counter-Strike series. In professional CS:GO, the Valve-sponsored Majors are the most prestigious tournaments.

The defending champion was Gambit Esports, which became the first Asian team, and just the second non-European team, to win a Major with their win at Kraków 2017. The Swedish team Fnatic attended as the most decorated CS:GO team in Major history, with three wins.

== Format ==
On December 13, 2017, ELEAGUE announced a revamp of the Major format, designed by Valve and ELEAGUE. The offline qualifier preceding the Major would be rebranded as part of the main Major and be called the "New Challengers stage." The teams in this qualifier would be given in-game stickers and receive the associated revenue. Four regional Minors – Americas, Asia, CIS, and Europe – sent two teams each to the New Challengers stage, competing against the bottom eight teams from the previous Major, Kraków 2017. The New Challengers stage was a Swiss-system tournament that took place in Atlanta from January 19, 2018, to January 22, 2018.

The top eight teams moved on to the "New Legends stage", which replaced the group stages of previous Majors. This stage also included the eight Legends from the previous Major, creating a 16-team group stage similar to previous Majors. Like the Challengers stage, the Legends stage used a Swiss-system format, and the top eight teams from this stage moved on to the playoff round. The playoffs, now known as the "Champions stage", remained a single elimination, best-of-three bracket.

=== Map pool ===
The map pool remained the same as at the previous major, even though Valve released the new version of Dust II in October 2017.

Maps

- Cache
- Cobblestone
- Inferno
- Mirage
- Nuke
- Overpass
- Train

== Regional qualifiers ==
Each regional qualifier, called "Minors", featured eight teams, whether through direct invitation or through qualifiers. Each minor featured two groups of four teams; these groups were in GSL double elimination formats, which was the format used at every major until the ELEAGUE Major, with the initial matches and winners match being best of ones and the losers and decider series being best of three. Two teams of each group qualify for the bracket phase, which is a four team, double elimination, best of three bracket. Two teams qualify for the major qualifier from each minor.

Each minor also had a US$50,000 prize pool with first place receiving US$30,000, second place taking in US$15,000, and third place raking in the last US$5,000.

=== Asia Minor ===
The Asia Minor took place shortly after the major announcement. Eight teams were invited to the qualifier in Seoul, South Korea and no online, open, or closed qualifier took place. This caused some controversy as minors were intended for all teams to be able to qualify and had no chance to prove themselves; top Asian teams such as Recca eSports, Grayhound Gaming, and Risky Gaming had more success than the likes of The MongolZ and other teams in the minor but were not invited. The Asia Minor took place on October 26, 2017, to October 29, 2017.

Teams

- B.O.O.T-dream[S]cape
- Flash Gaming
- Kings Gaming Club
- MVP PK
- Renegades
- Tainted Minds
- The MongolZ
- TyLoo

Upper round 1
A1	Renegades	2
B2	Flash Gaming	0
B1	TyLoo	2
A2	MVP PK	0
Lower round 1
B2	Flash Gaming	2
A2	MVP PK	0

Upper final
A1	Renegades	2
B1	TyLoo	1
Lower final
B1	TyLoo	2
B2	Flash Gaming	1

Final
A1	Renegades	2
B1	TyLoo	0

=== CIS Minor ===
The Commonwealth of Independent States Minor took place on the same dates as the Asia Minor in Bucharest, Romania and used the same format as the Asia Minor.

Teams

- Team Spirit (Invited)
- Tengri (Invited)
- AVANGAR (Open 1st–4th)
- NOTBAD (Open 1st–4th)
- pro100 (Open 1st–4th)
- Quantum Bellator Fire (Open 1st–4th)
- Nemiga Gaming (Open 7th–8th)
- forZe (Last Chance)

Upper round 1
A1	pro100	0
B2	Q.B. Fire	2
B1	AVANGAR	2
A2	Team Spirit	0
Lower round 1
A1	pro100	0
A2	Team Spirit	2

Upper final
B2	Q.B. Fire	1
B1	AVANGAR	2
Lower final
B2	Q.B. Fire	2
A2	Team Spirit	1

Final
B1	AVANGAR	2
B2	Q.B. Fire	1

=== Europe Minor ===
The Europe Minor took place on November 2, 2017, and ended on November 5, 2017. No team was invited to the minor, but eight teams – GODSENT, HellRaisers, Heroic, Ninjas in Pyjamas, OpTic Gaming, Space Soldiers, Team EnVyUs, and Team LDLC.com – were invited to the closed qualifier. Another eight teams qualified through an open qualifier, which was a 512 team bracket. There, the sixteen teams played in a Swiss group stage, with all matches played online. The final eight teams went on to go to Bucharest to determine which two teams would move on to the New Challenger stage.

The open qualifiers were played on the platform CEVO, as opposed to the more popular ESEA, which is run by ESL, and FACEIT as both had been used for the qualifiers in the past. However, ELEAGUE's decision to use CEVO spurred controversy in the community as CEVO's anti-cheat system was not as well developed as ESL or FACEIT, leading to many players, particularly in the Europe open qualifier, to play with cheats on. Many of these cheaters were banned mid-match, causing many forced forfeits in the 512 team bracket.

Teams

- OpTic Gaming (Closed #1–2)
- Space Soldiers (Closed #1–2)
- AGO Gaming (Closed #3–5)
- Windigo Gaming (Closed #3–5)
- Team EnVyUs (Closed #3–5)
- eXtatus (Closed #6–8)
- GODSENT (Closed #6–8)
- Pride Gaming (Closed #6–8)

Upper round 1
A1	Team EnVyUs	1
B2	Space Soldiers	2
B1	OpTic Gaming	2
A2	AGO Gaming	0
Lower round 1
A1	Team EnVyUs	2
A2	AGO Gaming	1

Upper final
B2	Space Soldiers	2
B1	OpTic Gaming	1
Lower final
B1	OpTic Gaming	0
A1	Team EnVyUs	2

Final
B2	Space Soldiers	2
A1	Team EnVyUs	0

=== Americas Minor ===
The Americas Minor took place on the same dates as the Europe Minor in Toronto, Canada. Two teams were automatically invited to the minor: Team Liquid and Counter Logic Gaming. One team from the South American open also qualified for the tournament. The remaining five spots went to the top five teams in the North American open qualifier. There, eight teams were invited – compLexity Gaming, Ghost Gaming, Immortals, Luminosity Gaming, Misfits, NRG Esports, Rogue, and Splyce – and another eight teams qualified through an open qualifier.

Teams

- Counter Logic Gaming (Invited)
- Team Liquid (Invited)
- compLexity Gaming (North America #1–2)
- NRG Esports (North America #1–2)
- Luminosity Gaming (North America #3–5)
- Rise Nation (North America #3–5)
- Team One (South America Open)
- Misfits (North America Last Chance)

Upper round 1
A1	Team Liquid	1
B2	Misfits	2
B1	Counter Logic G.	2
A2	compLexity G.	0
Lower round 1
A1	Team Liquid	2
A2	compLexity G.	0

Upper final
B2	Misfits	2
B1	Counter Logic G.	1
Lower final
B1	Counter Logic G.	0
A1	Team Liquid	2

Final
B2	Misfits	1
A1	Team Liquid	2

== Broadcast talent ==
The broadcast talent of the Boston major was announced on the same day as the preliminary group stage.

Desk host

- Richard Lewis

Stage host

- Sue "Smix" Lee

Master of Ceremonies

- Alex "Goldenboy" Mendez

Commentators

- Anders Blume
- James Bardolph
- Daniel "ddk" Kapadia
- Henry "HenryG" Greer
- Jason "moses" O'Toole
- Matthew "Sadokist" Trivett

Analysts

- Sean "seang@res" Gares
- Jordan "n0thing" Gilbert
- Janko "YNk" Paunović

The casters also served as analysts when not casting
Observers

- Heather "sapphiRe" Garozzo
- DJ "Prius" Kuntz

=== Broadcasts ===
The major was streamed in various languages across Twitch. ELEAGUE also streamed the major on its website and YouTube.

- ELEAGUE TV
- 1PV
- 99Damage
- Brekan
- Gamers Club
- GamerHUTV
- GamerTV
- Hitpoint
- Huomao
- Moreira
- Pitu Herranz
- Starladder
- wiizz

== Teams competing ==
Legends

- Gambit Esports
- ~~100 Thieves~~ (Note: On December 12, 2017, the organization 100 Thieves, founded by professional Call of Duty player Matthew "Nadeshot" Haag and backed by the National Basketball Association's Cleveland Cavaliers, acquired the Immortals roster that had finished second at the previous Major. At the end of the first day of the ELEAGUE Major, 100 Thieves announced that due to immigration issues, the team would not be able to attend.)
- Astralis
- Virtus.pro
- BIG
- Fnatic
- North
- SK Gaming

Kraków 2017 Bottom 8

- Cloud9
- FlipSid3 Tactics
- G2 Esports
- mousesports
- Natus Vincere
- Sprout Esports (Note: After two of PENTA Sports' players transferred to other teams, PENTA Sports released the remaining three players of kRYSTAL, innocent, and zehN. kRYSTAL later announced that the team would go under the name Seed until picked up by an organization. Seed was later acquired by Sprout Esports.)
- FaZe Clan
- Vega Squadron

Regional Qualifiers

- Renegades (Asia Minor #1)
- Flash Gaming (Asia Minor #3) (Note: TyLoo's star player Hansel "BnTet" Ferdinand was not able to make the Major because he was unable to acquire a US visa. TyLoo's former coach Luis "peacemaker" Tadeu was set to take BnTeT's place, but disagreements between peacemaker and the TyLoo organization forced TyLoo to drop out from the Major. Flash Gaming, the second runner-up at the Asia Minor, took TyLoo's spot.)
- AVANGAR (CIS Minor #1)
- Quantum Bellator Fire (CIS Minor #2)
- Space Soldiers (Europe Minor #1)
- Team EnVyUs (Europe Minor #2)
- Team Liquid (Americas Minor #1)
- Misfits Gaming (Americas Minor #2)

=== Controversy ===
Several problems arose from the Major. The most common complaint was that the announcement of the Major was announced so late that several players were not able to obtain visas to their Minors or the Major itself. In addition, Valve did not allow coaches Luis "peacemaker" Tadeu of TyLoo and Wilton "zews" Prado of Team Liquid to have their own stickers despite peacemaker standing in for Hansel "BnTeT" Ferdinand, who had visa issues, and zews standing in for Lucas "steel" Lopes, who had to sit out due to rules regarding roster locks. peacemaker said on Twitter that he was unhappy with the way ELEAGUE and Valve were handling player roster locks and the sticker situation – as player situations, handled by ELEAGUE, amounted to teams having to play with their original rosters and fifty percent of sticker sales went directly to the players and organization – and the team was considering to forfeit its spot in the major since peacemaker's role was a coach and not a player. In addition, peacemaker left TyLoo beforehand to become the coach of the Danish organization Heroic. TyLoo later confirmed its absence at the major as Flash Gaming, the third-place finisher from the Asia Minor, set to take its place as peacemaker and TyLoo could not work out a deal together.

Another big complication in the Major were the aforementioned the rules on roster locks. Valve said that the tournament organizers, not Valve, were responsible for the rules on roster locks, and ELEAGUE rules stated that players that competed in any Minor or the Americas Minor closed qualifier cannot compete on a team that would participate in the Major. The roster locks themselves were not the issue; the main issue was why the roster locks were placed months in advance of the major. SK Gaming had placed João "felps" Vasconcellos on the inactive roster by his own request and brought in Ricardo "boltz" Prass in October; Nicolai "dev1ce" Reedtz of Astralis had medical issues in late November; and Team Liquid brought in Lucas "steel" Lopes in place of Peter "stanislaw" Jarguz in mid November, but these teams had to be forced to play with stand-ins. Most of the community and players were dissatisfied with the situation. This raised the question as to why Joakim "disco doplan" Gidetun was allowed to play with Epsilon eSports during the European qualifier and then played with Fnatic at the last ELEAGUE Major, but that situation doesn't apply with a few teams at the Boston 2018 Major. Shortly after losing to SK Gaming at ESL Pro League Season 6, FaZe Clan's Ladislav "GuardiaN" Kovács said that the Major would be devalued if teams such as SK Gaming would have to play with a stand-in rather than their complete rosters. SK Gaming's Epitácio "TACO" de Melo said the rule was "ridiculous" and went on to say that "I don't think majors are a big deal in CS:GO anymore." Journalist Jarek "DeKay" Lewis said that he tried to reach out to ELEAGUE in an effort for an explanation "to try and find out when and why the roster lock rule changed" but the organization never responded. A couple of weeks later, SK Gaming's captain Gabriel "FalleN" Toledo also wanted an explanation as to why ELEAGUE won't say anything about the roster locks, but ELEAGUE continued to stay quiet. Journalist Richard Lewis, who worked as the host for ELEAGUE at the time, said in one of his podcasts with Duncan "Thorin" Shields that roster locks are necessary in order for teams to not make changes before the Major to benefit them for the tournament. After defeating SK Gaming in the semifinals, Cloud9 lurker Timothy "autimatic" Ta also claimed that the system wasn't fair.

In the New Champions stage, the continuing argument of why the fourth quarterfinal series was played on the same day as the two semifinals was asked, as the first team in the second semifinals was much more rested than the second team in the semifinals, who only had a few hours of rest. After Cloud9 defeated SK Gaming in that second semifinals, SK's captain FalleN, SK's entry fragger Fernando "fer" Alvarenga, Fnatic's coach Jimmy "Jumpy" Berndtsson, and Cloud9's support player Will "RUSH" Wierzba all said that the system was unfair to the team who had to play two series in a day compared to the team who only needed to play one. Out of the seven Majors in which the fourth quarterfinal match was played in the same day as the semifinals, the winner of that quarterfinal lost five times in the semifinals.

=== Pre-major ranking ===
HLTV.org rank teams based on results of teams' performances. The rankings shown below reflect the January 8, 2018 rankings.

HLTV.org pre-major ranking

World ranking
Place	Team	Points	Best Major placing
1	SK Gaming	998	1st at Columbus 2016 (as Luminosity); 1st at Cologne 2016
2	FaZe Clan	946	5th at Atlanta 2017
3	Astralis	570	1st at Atlanta 2017
5	Cloud9	400	5th at Cologne 2014
6	Fnatic	346	1st at Winter 2013; 1st at Katowice 2015; 1st Cologne 2015
7	G2 Esports	346	1st at Cluj-Napoca 2015 (as EnVyUs)
8	mousesports	326	9th at Cluj-Napoca 2015; 9th at Columbus 2016; 9th at Cologne 2016
9	North	286	5th at Atlanta 2017; 5th at Kraków 2017
10	Virtus.pro	239	1st at Katowice 2014
11	Gambit Esports	222	1st at Kraków 2017
13	Misfits Gaming	193	2nd at Boston 2018 Americas Minor
14	Natus Vincere	186	2nd at Cluj-Napoca 2015; 2nd at Columbus 2016
15	Team EnVyUs	157	2nd at Boston 2018 Europe Minor
17	Team Liquid	146	2nd at Cologne 2016
20	Renegades	123	9th at Cologne 2015
22	BIG	85	5th at Kraków 2017
23	Space Soldiers	79	1st at Boston 2018 Europe Minor
24	Vega Squadron	66	15th at Kraków 2017
27	100 Thieves	45	2nd at Kraków 2017 (as Immortals)
29	Sprout Esports	43	5th at Winter 2014 (as PENTA); 5th at Katowice 2015 (as PENTA)
37	AVANGAR	–	1st at Boston 2018 CIS Minor
60	Quantum Bellator Fire	–	2nd at Boston 2018 CIS Minor
61	Flash Gaming	–	3rd at Boston 2018 Asia Minor
NR	FlipSid3 Tactics	–	5th at Cologne 2016

== New Challengers stage ==
The Challengers stage, also known as the Preliminary stage and formerly known as the offline qualifier, will be a sixteen team swiss tournament: after the randomly-drawn Day 1 games, teams will play other teams with the same win–loss record. Every round will consist of one game. In addition, teams will not play the same team twice unless necessary and teams will be randomly chosen. Any team with three wins would qualify for the major, and any team with three losses would be eliminated. The Challenger stage will be played in Atlanta, Georgia, United States at the Turner Studios.

In the first round, teams from pool one will be matched up against teams in pool four. Teams in pool two will play teams in pool three. One team from a pool is randomly decided to face off against a randomly decided team in another pool. Cloud9, FlipSid3 Tactics, G2 Esports, and Natus Vincere (Na'Vi) were in pool one based on Cloud9, FlipSid3, and G2's ninth-place finish and Na'Vi's eleventh-place finish at the PGL Major; Na'Vi had the higher seed over Sprout Esports and mousesports as Na'Vi was already a Legend going into the PGL Major. Sprout, mousesports, FaZe Clan, and Vega Squadron were in pool two based on the eleventh-place finish or the last place finish at the PGL Major. Renegades, AVANGAR, Space Soldiers, and Team Liquid were in pool three based on winning their respective minor qualifiers. Flash Gaming, Quantum Bellator Fire, Team EnVyUs, and Misfits Gaming were in pool four based on being the runners-up in their respective minor qualifiers.

In the second round, the winners in the first round will face each other in the "high" matches, in which teams with a 1–0 record will play against each other; the losers will face each other in the "low" matches, in which teams with a 0–1 record will play each other.

In the third round, the winners of the high matches (teams with 2–0 records) from round two will face each other. The winners of these two matches will qualify for the major. The losers of the high round and the winners of the low round (teams with 1–1 records) will face each other in the "mid" matches. The losers from the previous low matches (teams with 0–2 records) will face each other in round three's low matches. The losers of these low matches are eliminated. Twelve teams remain in the Challengers stage.

In the fourth round, the losers of the high matches and the winners of the mid matches (teams with 2–1 records) will face each other in round four's high matches. The winners of those high matches qualify for the major. The losers of the mid matches and the winners of the low matches (teams with 1–2 records) will face each other in the low matches of round four. The losers of these matches are eliminated from the major. Six teams remain.

In the last round, the remaining teams will face off (teams with 2–2 records). The winners of these matches will qualify for the Legends stage and the losing teams will be eliminated from the major. In the most ideal of situations, the Swiss format should allow teams to have a harder time each time they win and have an easier time each time they lose.

The first round matchups were announced on January 9, 2018. The New Challengers stage took place from January 12 to January 15.

Place	Team	Record	RD	Round 1	Round 2	Round 3	Round 4	Round 5
1–2	Cloud9	3–0	+27	Team EnVyUs; 16–11; Cache	High match Sprout Esports; 16–5; Inferno	High match mousesports 16–5; Train	New Legends Stage	New Legends Stage
1–2	G2 Esports	3–0	+20	Flash Gaming; 16–11; Inferno	High match Misfits Gaming; 16–5; Cobblestone	High match Vega Squadron; 19–16; Overpass	New Legends Stage	New Legends Stage
3–5	FaZe Clan	3–1	+14	Team Liquid; 16–14; Overpass	High match Vega Squadron; 6–16; Inferno	Mid match Quantum Bellator Fire; 16–6; Mirage	High match Natus Vincere; 16–4; Train	New Legends stage
3–5	Vega Squadron	3–1	+11	Renegades; 16–14; Mirage	High match FaZe Clan; 16–6; Inferno	High match G2 Esports; 16–19; Overpass	High match Team Liquid; 16–14; Mirage	New Legends Stage
3–5	Space Soldiers	3–1	+7	Sprout Esports; 12–16; Cobblestone	Low match AVANGAR; 16–9; Mirage	Mid match Misfits Gaming; 16–13; Train	High match mousesports 19–17; Mirage	New Legends stage
6–8	mousesports	3–2	+19	AVANGAR; 16–12; Mirage	High match Natus Vincere; 16–2; Mirage	High match Cloud9; 5–16; Train	High match Space Soldiers; 17–19; Mirage	Renegades; 16–4; Mirage
6–8	Natus Vincere	3–2	+5	Quantum Bellator Fire; 16–8; Inferno	High match mousesports 2–16; Mirage	Mid match Sprout Esports; 3–16; Mirage	High match FaZe Clan; 4–16; Train	Team Liquid; 16–5; Inferno
6–8	Quantum Bellator Fire	3–2	+1	Natus Vincere; 8–16; Inferno	Low match Flash Gaming; 16–13; Inferno	Mid match FaZe Clan; 6–16; Mirage	Low match Team EnVyUs; 16–12; Inferno	AVANGAR; 16–6; Train
9–11	Renegades	2–3	0	Vega Squadron; 14–16; Mirage	Low match Team EnVyUs; 16–6; Cache	Mid match Team Liquid; 14–16; Cobblestone	Low match Sprout Esports; 16–10; Cobblestone	mousesports 4–16; Mirage
9–11	Team Liquid	2–3	−7	FaZe Clan; 14–16; Overpass	Low match FlipSid3 Tactics; 16–10; Cobblestone	Mid match Renegades; 16–14; Cobblestone	High match Vega Squadron; 14–16; Mirage	Natus Vincere; 5–16; Inferno
9–11	AVANGAR	2–3	−9	mousesports 12–16; Mirage	Low match Space Soldiers; 9–16; Mirage	Low match FlipSid3 Tactics; 16–7; Train	Low match Misfits Gaming; 16–13; Cache	Quantum Bellator Fire; 6–16; Train
12–14	Misfits Gaming	1–3	−5	FlipSid3 Tactics; 16–4; Overpass	High match G2 Esports; 5–16; Cobblestone	Mid match Space Soldiers; 13–16; Train	Low match AVANGAR; 13–16; Cache	Eliminated
12–14	Team EnVyUs	1–3	−16	Cloud9; 11–16; Cache	Low match Renegades; 6–16; Cache	Low match Flash Gaming; 16–13; Inferno	Low match Quantum Bellator Fire; 12–16; Inferno	Eliminated
12–14	Sprout Esports	1–3	−25	Space Soldiers; 16–12; Cobblestone	High match Cloud9; 5–16; Inferno	Mid match Natus Vincere; 3–16; Mirage	Low match Renegades; 10–16; Cobblestone	Eliminated
15–16	Flash Gaming	0–3	−11	G2 Esports; 11–16; Inferno	Low match Quantum Bellator Fire; 13–16; Inferno	Low match Team EnVyUs; 13–16; Inferno	Eliminated	Eliminated
15–16	FlipSid3 Tactics	0–3	−27	Misfits Gaming; 4–16; Overpass	Low match Team Liquid; 10–16; Cobblestone	Low match AVANGAR; 7–16; Train	Eliminated	Eliminated

=== Decider ===
After the conclusion of the first day, ELEAGUE and 100 Thieves, the runners-up of the last major, announced that the Brazilian roster would not attend due to immigration issues. To complete the sixteen team group stage for the New Legends stage, ELEAGUE decided to have one of the three ninth place teams take the open spot. The two teams with the easiest schedule from the three would face off in a best of one and then the winner of that match would go on to face off against the team that had the hardest schedule. The strength of schedule was determined by which how many wins the teams' opponents got. In the event in which the strength of schedule is the same, the tie breaker would be the head-to-head game. If the teams never played, then a random draw would take place.

Seeding
Renegades	AVANGAR	Team Liquid
Vega Squadron (3)	mousesports (3)	FaZe Clan (3)
Team EnVyUs (1)	Space Soldiers (3)	FlipSid3 Tactics (0)
Team Liquid (2)	FlipSid3 Tactics (0)	Renegades (2)
Sprout Esports (1)	Misfits Gaming (1)	Vega Squadron (3)
mousesports (3)	Quantum Bellator Fire (3)	Natus Vincere (3)
10	10	11

Renegades and AVANGAR faced off in the first match after round 5. Karlo "USTILO" Pivac had a back and forth major performance, but as he stepped up, Jame bettered the Renegades with a 30 bomb as AVANGAR pulled off yet another upset despite a last minute heroic play from NAF. AVANGAR went back to Mirage. Jame went stale against the Americans, but buster and qikert were able to step up to shoot down Liquid. However, Liquid made it close late into the game as the Americans were able to punish the aggression of the Kazakhs on their Terrorist side and Liquid defeated the underdogs in overtime.

Winner moves on to New Legends stage
Team	Score	Map	Score	Team
Renegades	10	Mirage	16	AVANGAR
Team Liquid	19	Mirage	15	AVANGAR

== New Legends stage ==
The Legends stage, formerly known as the Group stage, used the same format as the Challengers stage. This took place from January 19 to January 22.

Gambit Esports, Virtus.pro, Astralis, BIG were teams in pool one based on their top four placement at the PGL Major; BIG was in pool one because of its first-place finish in the Swiss stage last major. Fnatic, North, SK Gaming, and Cloud9 were teams in pool two based on their quarterfinals finish at the PGL Major; Cloud9 was randomly chosen between it and G2 Esports based on its first-place finish in the Challengers stage. G2 Esports, Vega Squadron, Space Soldiers, and FaZe Clan were in pool three. mousesports, Natus Vincere, Quantum Bellator Fire, and Team Liquid were in pool four.

Place	Team	Record	RD	Round 1	Round 2	Round 3	Round 4	Round 5
1–2	G2 Esports	3–0	+28	Cloud9; 16–8; Cache	High match Team Liquid; 16–8; Inferno	High match Quantum Bellator Fire; 16–4; Cache	New Champions stage	New Champions stage
1–2	FaZe Clan	3–0	+25	Fnatic; 16–8; Cache	High match Vega Squadron; 16–3; Train	High match SK Gaming; 16–12; Cache	New Champions stage	New Champions stage
3–5	Natus Vincere	3–1	+20	Gambit Esports; 5–16; Nuke	Low match BIG; 16–1; Inferno	Low match Team Liquid; 16–9; Overpass	High match Fnatic; 16–7; Inferno	New Champions stage
3–5	SK Gaming	3–1	+9	Space Soldiers; 16–13; Mirage	High match mousesports 16–12; Mirage	High match FaZe Clan; 12–16; Cache	High match Gambit Esports; 16–10; Overpass	New Champions stage
3–5	Quantum Bellator Fire	3–1	+6	Virtus.pro; 16–3; Cache	High match Gambit Esports; 19–16; Inferno	High match G2 Esports; 4–16; Cache	High match mousesports 16–14; Train	New Champions stage
6–8	mousesports	3–2	+24	Astralis; 16–2; Cache	High match SK Gaming; 12–16; Mirage	Mid match Vega Squadron; 16–3; Mirage	High match Quantum Bellator Fire; 14–16; Train	Space Soldiers; 16–13; Mirage
6–8	Cloud9	3–2	+20	G2 Esports; 8–16; Cache	Low match Space Soldiers; 13–16; Cobblestone	Low match Virtus.pro; 16–7; Mirage	Low match Astralis; 16–6; Train	Vega Squadron; 16–4; Mirage
6–8	Fnatic	3–2	+15	FaZe Clan; 8–16; Cache	Low match Virtus.pro; 16–6; Inferno	Mid match Astralis; 16–8; Mirage	High match Natus Vincere; 7–16; Inferno	Gambit Esports; 16–2; Mirage
9–11	Space Soldiers	2–3	+2	SK Gaming; 13–16; Mirage	Low match Cloud9; 16–13; Cobblestone	Mid match Gambit Esports; 13–16; Train	Low match BIG; 16–8; Cobblestone	mousesports 13–16; Mirage
9–11	Gambit Esports	2–3	−9	Natus Vincere; 16–5; Nuke	High match Quantum Bellator Fire; 16–19; Inferno	Mid match Space Soldiers; 16–13; Train	High match SK Gaming; 10–16; Overpass	Fnatic; 2–16; Mirage
9–11	Vega Squadron	2–3	−28	North; 16–10; Overpass	High match FaZe Clan; 3–16; Train	High match mousesports 3–16; Mirage	Low match Team Liquid; 16–12; Inferno	Cloud9; 4–16; Mirage
12–14	Team Liquid	1–3	−8	BIG; 16–5; Inferno	High match G2 Esports; 8–16; Inferno	High match Natus Vincere; 9–16; Overpass	Low match Vega Squadron; 12–16; Inferno	Eliminated
12–14	BIG	1–3	−28	Team Liquid; 5–16; Inferno	Low match Natus Vincere; 1–16; Inferno	Low match North; 16–12; Cobblestone	Low match Space Soldiers; 8–16; Cobblestone	Eliminated
12–14	Astralis	1–3	−30	mousesports 2–16; Cache	Low match North; 16–14; Train	Mid match Fnatic; 8–16; Mirage	Low match Cloud9; 6–16; Train	Eliminated
15–16	North	0–3	−12	Vega Squadron; 10–16; Overpass	Low match Astralis; 14–16; Train	Low match BIG; 12–16; Cobblestone	Eliminated	Eliminated
15–16	Virtus.pro	0–3	−32	Quantum Bellator Fire; 3–16; Cache	Low match Fnatic; 6–16; Inferno	Low match Cloud9; 7–16; Mirage	Eliminated	Eliminated

== New Champions stage ==
The New Champions Stage is a best of three single elimination bracket. Teams play into overtime until a winner is decided. This stage took place at the Agganis Arena between January 26 and January 28.

=== Bracket ===
Quarterfinals
2	FaZe Clan	19	16	–	2
6	mousesports	16	9	–	0
3	Natus Vincere	16	16	–	2
5	Quantum Bellator Fire	4	7	–	0
1	G2 Esports	8	7	–	0
7	Cloud9	16	16	–	2
4	SK Gaming	19	16	16	2
8	Fnatic	22	14	12	1

Semifinals
2	FaZe Clan	16	16	–	2
3	Natus Vincere	9	7	–	0
7	Cloud9	16	8	16	2
4	SK Gaming	3	16	9	1

Finals
2	FaZe Clan	16	10	19	1
7	Cloud9	14	16	22	2

=== Quarterfinals ===
==== FaZe Clan vs. mousesports ====
Casters: Sadokist & HenryG

FaZe Clan vs. mousesports Scores
Team	Score	Map	Score	Team
FaZe Clan	19	Nuke	16	mousesports
FaZe Clan	16	Cache	9	mousesports
FaZe Clan	–	Train	–	mousesports

==== Natus Vincere vs. Quantum Bellator Fire ====
Casters: James Bardolph & ddk

Natus Vincere vs. Quantum Bellator Fire Scores
Team	Score	Map	Score	Team
Natus Vincere	16	Mirage	4	Quantum Bellator Fire
Natus Vincere	16	Inferno	7	Quantum Bellator Fire
Natus Vincere	–	Train	–	Quantum Bellator Fire

==== G2 Esports vs. Cloud9 ====
Casters: Anders Blume & moses

G2 Esports vs. Cloud9 Scores
Team	Score	Map	Score	Team
G2 Esports	8	Mirage	16	Cloud9
G2 Esports	7	Overpass	16	Cloud9
G2 Esports	–	Cobblestone	–	Cloud9

==== SK Gaming vs. Fnatic ====
Casters: James Bardolph & ddk

SK Gaming vs. Fnatic Scores
Team	Score	Map	Score	Team
SK Gaming	19	Inferno	22	Fnatic
SK Gaming	16	Overpass	14	Fnatic
SK Gaming	16	Mirage	12	Fnatic

=== Semifinals ===
==== FaZe Clan vs. Natus Vincere ====
Casters: Sadokist & HenryG

FaZe Clan vs. Natus Vincere Scores
Team	Score	Map	Score	Team
FaZe Clan	16	Inferno	9	Natus Vincere
FaZe Clan	16	Mirage	7	Natus Vincere
FaZe Clan	–	Train	–	Natus Vincere

==== Cloud9 vs. SK Gaming ====
Casters: Anders Blume & moses

Cloud9 vs. SK Gaming Scores
Team	Score	Map	Score	Team
Cloud9	16	Mirage	3	SK Gaming
Cloud9	8	Cobblestone	16	SK Gaming
Cloud9	16	Inferno	9	SK Gaming

=== Finals ===
Casters: James Bardolph & ddk

Skadoodle was named the U.S. Air Force MVP of the tournament by ELEAGUE, while HLTV.org gave the MVP to tarik.

The final map broke a new record with more than 1.8 million viewers, including more than 1.3 million viewers on Twitch.

Cloud9 became the first ever North American team to win a Major and it was the fourth Major in which a non-European team won the Major in five Major tournaments.

FaZe Clan vs. Cloud9 Scores
Team	Score	Map	Score	Team
FaZe Clan	16	Mirage	14	Cloud9
FaZe Clan	10	Overpass	16	Cloud9
FaZe Clan	19	Inferno	22	Cloud9

== Final standings ==
The final placings are shown below. In addition, the prize distribution, seed for the next major, roster, and coaches are shown. Each team's in-game leader is shown first.

Place	Prize Money	Team	Seed	Roster	Coach
1st	US$500,000	Cloud9	London 2018 Legends	tarik, autimatic, RUSH, Skadoodle, Stewie2K	valens
2nd	US$150,000	FaZe Clan	London 2018 Legends	karrigan, GuardiaN, NiKo, olofmeister, rain	RobbaN
3rd – 4th	US$70,000	Natus Vincere	London 2018 Legends	Zeus, Edward, s1mple, electronic, flamie	kane
3rd – 4th	US$70,000	SK Gaming	London 2018 Legends	FalleN, coldzera, felps, fer, TACO	dead
5th – 8th	US$35,000	Fnatic	London 2018 Legends	Golden, flusha, JW, KRiMZ, Lekr0	Jumpy
5th – 8th	US$35,000	G2 Esports	London 2018 Legends	shox, apEX, bodyy, kennyS, NBK-	SmithZz
5th – 8th	US$35,000	mousesports	London 2018 Legends	chrisJ, oskar, ropz, STYKO, suNny	lmbt
5th – 8th	US$35,000	Quantum Bellator Fire	London 2018 Legends	waterfaLLZ, balblna, Boombl4, jmqa, Kvik	iksou
9th – 11th	US$8,750	Gambit Esports	London 2018 New Challengers	Dosia, AdreN, fitch, HObbit, mou	Andi
9th – 11th	US$8,750	Space Soldiers	London 2018 New Challengers	MAJ3R, Calyx, ngiN, paz, XANTARES	hardstyle
9th – 11th	US$8,750	Vega Squadron	London 2018 New Challengers	jR, chopper, hutji, keshander, mir	Fierce
12th – 14th	US$8,750	Astralis	London 2018 New Challengers	gla1ve, dev1ce, dupreeh, Kjaerbye, Xyp9x	zonic
12th – 14th	US$8,750	BIG	London 2018 New Challengers	gob b, keev, nex, tabseN, LEGIJA	kakafu
12th – 14th	US$8,750	Team Liquid	London 2018 New Challengers	zews, ELiGE, jdm64, nitr0, Twistzz	–
15th – 16th	US$8,750	North	London 2018 New Challengers	MSL, aizy, cajunb, k0nfig, valde	ruggah
15th – 16th	US$8,750	Virtus.pro	London 2018 New Challengers	TaZ, byali, NEO, pashaBiceps, Snax	kuben
17th	–	AVANGAR	–	Jame, buster, dimasick, KrizzeN, qikert	dastan
18th	–	Renegades	–	Nifty, AZR, jks, USTILO, NAF	kassad
19th – 21st	–	Misfits Gaming	–	seang@res, ShahZaM, SicK, AmaNeK, devoduvek	–
19th – 21st	–	Sprout Esports	–	kRYSTAL, denis, Spiidi, innocent, zehN	tow b
19th – 21st	–	Team EnVyUs	–	Happy, Rpk, SIXER, xms, ScreaM	maLeK
22nd – 23rd	–	Flash Gaming	–	karsa, AttackeR, LOVEYY, Summer, kaze	z8z
22nd – 23rd	–	FlipSid3 Tactics	–	B1ad3, markeloff, seized, WorldEdit, wayLander	–
DQ	–	100 Thieves	–	BIT, fnx, HEN1, kNgV-, LUCAS1	bLecker

=== Post-major ranking ===
HLTV.org rank teams based on results of teams' performances. The rankings shown below reflect the January 29, 2018 rankings, the first ranking after the major.

HLTV.org post-major ranking

World ranking
Place	Team	Points	Move^{1}
1	SK Gaming	916	Steady
2	FaZe Clan	914	Steady
3	Cloud9	609	▲2
4	G2 Esports	408	▲3
5	Astralis	407	▼2
6	Fnatic	358	Steady
7	mousesports	350	▲1
9	Natus Vincere	287	▲5
10	Virtus.pro	204	Steady
11	Gambit Esports	190	Steady
12	North	286	▼3
14	Team Liquid	145	▲3
15	Misfits Gaming	140	▼2
16	Quantum Bellator Fire	130	▲44
17	Vega Squadron	121	▲7
18	Space Soldiers	119	▲5
19	Renegades	114	▲1
20	Team EnVyUs	109	▼5
24	BIG	75	▼2
27	AVANGAR	56	▲10
28	Sprout Esports	43	▲1
54	Flash Gaming	–	▲7
60	FlipSid3 Tactics	–	▲ ?

^{1}Change since January 8, 2018 ranking
