= Remilia =

American professional gamer (1995–2019)

- Creveling in 2016

Personal information
- Name: Maria Creveling
- Nickname(s): Thresh Queen, MadWife
- Born: February 2, 1995; Portland, Maine, U.S.
- Died: December 27, 2019 (aged 24); Las Vegas, Nevada, U.S.

Career information
- Games: League of Legends
- Playing career: 2013–2019
- Role: Support

Team history
- 2013: Curse Academy
- 2013–2014: No Big Deal
- 2014: Necrofantasian
- 2014–2015: Team Dragon Knights
- 2014–2015: Roar
- 2015–2016: Misfits / Renegades
- 2016–2017: Kaos Latin Gamers
- 2016–2017: FlyQuest
- 2018: Team Quetzal
- 2019: Sector 7

Maria Creveling (February 2, 1995 – December 27, 2019), better known as Remilia, (Note: Other in-game names adopted by Creveling during her career include Remi, Sakuya and Yuno.) was an American professional League of Legends player. She was the first woman and first transgender person to compete in the North American League of Legends Championship Series, debuting in the 2016 spring split as the support for Renegades. However, she took a sudden hiatus from professional play a few weeks into her debut season due to onstage pressure and online harassment. During her career she was particularly known for her mastery of the character Thresh, which earned her the nicknames "Thresh Queen" and "MadWife". (Note: A reference to Hong "MadLife" Min-gi, a well-known South Korean Thresh player.)

== Early life ==
Maria Creveling was born in Portland, Maine, on February 2, 1995. According to Creveling, she came out as a trans woman when she was 15 years old, and was consequently disowned by her mother. Prior to the release of League of Legends, she was an avid player of the real-time strategy game Age of Mythology (2002) and the third-person shooter GunZ: The Duel (2005).

== Career ==
Creveling began her career competing in the North American League of Legends Challenger Series (NA CS), the secondary league of the North American League of Legends Championship Series (NA LCS). Adopting the in-game name "Yuno", (Note: A reference to Yuno Gasai, the female protagonist of the Japanese manga and anime series Future Diary.) she joined her first team, Curse Academy, in July 2013, and played as their support. She was recognized for her prowess with Thresh, a character known for his ability to hook opponents and the high skill ceiling of his gameplay. This led to her being nicknamed "Thresh Queen" and "MadWife", the latter a reference to Hong "MadLife" Min-gi, another well-known Thresh player. After leaving Curse Academy, Creveling played for a number of other teams attempting to qualify for the NA CS, including No Big Deal, Necrofantasian, Team Dragon Knights and Roar. In early 2015, she changed her in-game name to "Remilia" (Note: A reference to Remilia Scarlet, a character in the Japanese video game series Touhou Project.) and joined Misfits, the team she saw the most success with. Misfits rebranded to Renegades later that year in June, after qualifying for the NA CS. The team went on to defeat Team Coast in the 2015 NA CS summer finals, qualifying for the 2016 NA LCS spring split.

Creveling subsequently debuted as the NA LCS's first woman player, as well as its first transgender player, under the shortened alias "Remi". Guinness World Records recognizes Creveling as the "first female pro–League of Legends player". However, a few weeks into the 2016 spring split, Creveling stepped down from the starting roster, citing anxiety and self-esteem issues that were exacerbated by onstage pressure. Creveling had also been the target of sexist and transphobic comments during live streams of her team's matches and in the comment sections of related videos and articles.

After an eight-month hiatus from professional play, Creveling joined South American team Kaos Latin Gamers on October 5, 2016, under the in-game name "Sakuya". However, she only played one event with the team before leaving in January 2017 to return to the United States for surgery on a paralyzed vocal cord. Later that month, she joined FlyQuest as a substitute player but left shortly after in August. She then shifted her focus to streaming League of Legends and Teamfight Tactics gameplay on Twitch.

== Death ==
Creveling died in her sleep on December 27, 2019, at the age of 24. Her death was publicly announced a day later by esports journalist Richard Lewis, who was Creveling's close friend and roommate in Las Vegas at the time. Fans paid tribute to her online by leaving comments on her Twitch and Twitter pages. Riot Games, the developer of League of Legends, also released a statement mourning her death.
