= Dexerto =

Video game and entertainment news website

- Screenshot Screenshot of Dexerto on April 7, 2025
- Company type: Limited
- Website type: Entertainment news
- Founded: 19 March 2015; 11 years ago
- Headquarters: London, England, United Kingdom
- Founder: Joshua Nino, Chris Marsh, Mike Kent, Nicolas Hulsmans
- Editor: Tom East
- CEO: Joshua Nino
- Revenue: ▲US$10 million (2021)
- Website: dexerto.com dexerto.media

Dexerto is a video game and entertainment news website operated by Dexerto Limited. Founded in 2015 and headquartered in London, the site originally focused on esports but later shifted towards tabloid-style coverage of video games and internet culture, with a particularly strong focus on internet personalities.

== History ==
Dexerto was founded on 19 March 2015 by Joshua Nino, Chris Marsh, Mike Kent, and Nicolas Hulsmans to cover esports. It originally launched as two websites, one in English and the other in French. A Spanish website was also launched. The coverage of the website subsequently shifted. A 2022 Business Insider article described its coverage as "evolv[ing] to chronicle broader online culture, with a flair for drama in the gaming space and beyond", with a particular focus on drama and controversies involving internet personalities, who attract broader interest than esports, while continuing to cover esports to some degree. Esports analyst Rod Breslau described the website as the "TMZ of esports". Founder Nino described the website as being staffed by both "amateur bloggers and veteran esports journalists alike". Some internet personalities like Pokimane accuse Dexerto of producing clickbait content about them.

Dexerto director Mike Kent won joint "Reporter of the Year" at the 2018 UK Esports Awards. In 2020 Axios described the website as "The most high-profile independent [esports] outlet". In September 2020, the site named veteran esports journalist Richard Lewis as editor-at-large. In 2022, Dexerto's users exceeded 30 million per month, and the company reported in excess of $10 million in revenue. Also in 2022, the site was involved in controversy after tweeting "Former porn star Adriana Chechik gets her back blown out, this time by a hard floor at TwitchCon" after Chechik had suffered major spinal injuries after a hard fall diving into a foam pit without appropriate floor cushioning at that year's TwitchCon. The tweet was subsequently deleted.
