= Tarik (gamer) =

American Twitch streamer (born 1996)

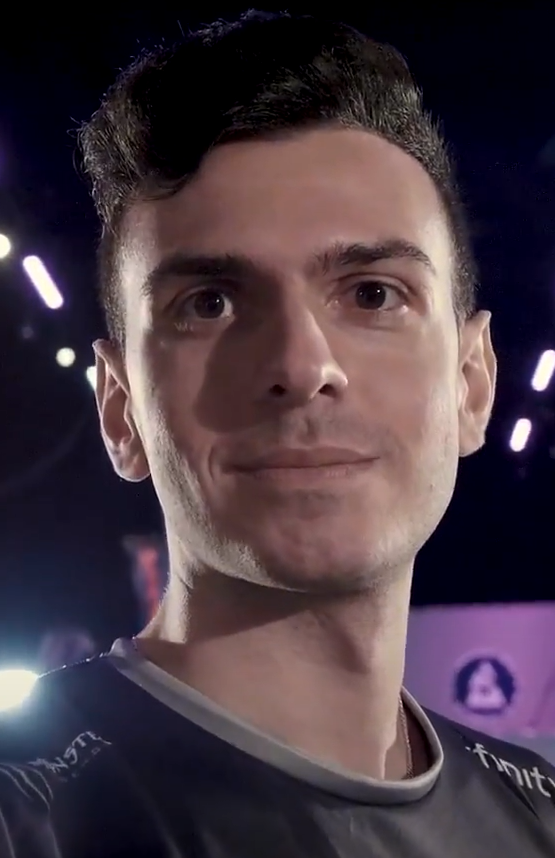
- Çelik in 2020
- Born: Tarık Çelik; February 18, 1996 (age 30); Brooklyn, New York

Twitch information
- Channel: tarik
- Years active: 2012–present
- Genres: Gaming; Just Chatting
- Games: Counter-Strike: Global Offensive; Valorant
- Followers: 3.3 million

YouTube information
- Channel: tarik
- Years active: 2014–present
- Genre: Gaming
- Subscribers: 1.02 million
- Views: 486 million

Esports career information
- Games: Counter-Strike: Global Offensive; Valorant
- Playing career: 2014–2021, 2022–present

Team history
- Counter-Strike: Global Offensive
- 2014: NetcodeGuides.com
- 2014–2015: mouseSpaz
- 2015–2016: Counter Logic Gaming
- 2016–2017: OpTic Gaming
- 2017–2018: Cloud9
- 2018–2019: MIBR
- 2019: NRG Esports
- 2019–2022: Evil Geniuses
- Valorant
- 2022–present: Sentinels
- Last updated: 20 March 2026

Tarık Çelik (born February 18, 1996), also known mononymously as Tarik, is an American Twitch streamer. He is a former professional Counter-Strike: Global Offensive and Valorant player. He signed to Sentinels as a content creator in 2022.

During his professional career in CS:GO, he won the ELEAGUE Season 2 with OpTic Gaming and the ELEAGUE Major: Boston 2018 with Cloud9. For the latter, he was named MVP. Çelik has earned over $750,000 in winnings.

== Early life ==
Tarık Çelik was born on February 18, 1996, in Brooklyn, New York. He is of Turkish descent and had an early interest in video games. Çelik competed in CAL leagues for CS:GO while he was still in middle school and, in high school, gained exposure in the community for creating deathmatch servers called FragShack.

== Career ==
Çelik first created his Twitch channel in 2012, and his YouTube channel in 2014. He was originally called NoShirtTV. Çelik went professional in 2014 after signing with NetcodeGuides.com. He joined Counter Logic Gaming in 2015 and performed well in multiple ESL One tournaments. With OpTic Gaming, he won his first six-figure tournament prize of $400,000 after winning ELEAGUE Season 2 in 2016. The team also won $120,000 in their second-place finish at Esports Championship Series Season 2. In 2018, while playing for Cloud9, he won the ELEAGUE Major: Boston 2018 and was named MVP. His team's win was the first time a North American team won a major for Counter-Strike and he is the only American MVP of a CS:GO major. In 2019, he helped Evil Geniuses win their first StarSeries i-League title after winning the StarSeries & i-League CS:GO Season 8. They also got first place at ESL One: Cologne 2020 Online - North America.

Çelik retired from professional gaming in 2019 to stream full-time. One of his nicknames was "The Content King". He grew significantly in 2021. He signed with management company Loaded in July 2022. He also began creating content under Sentinels in August 2022. During this time, he was known for his watch parties of matches in the Valorant Champions Tour. In 2024, he was named a part of the Forbes 30 Under 30.

== Awards and nominations ==
Year	Award	Category	Result	Ref.
2021	The Streamer Awards	Best FPS Streamer	Won	
2022	The Streamer Awards	Best Valorant Streamer	Nominated	
2022	The Streamer Awards	Gamer of the Year	Nominated	
2023	The Streamer Awards	Best FPS Streamer	Won	
2023	The Streamer Awards	Gamer of the Year	Nominated	
2022	Streamy Awards	Streamer of the Year	Nominated	
2022	Streamy Awards	Competitive Gamer	Won	
2023	Streamy Awards	Streamer of the Year	Nominated	
2023	Streamy Awards	Competitive Gamer	Nominated	
