= DoA (commentator) =

American esports commentator

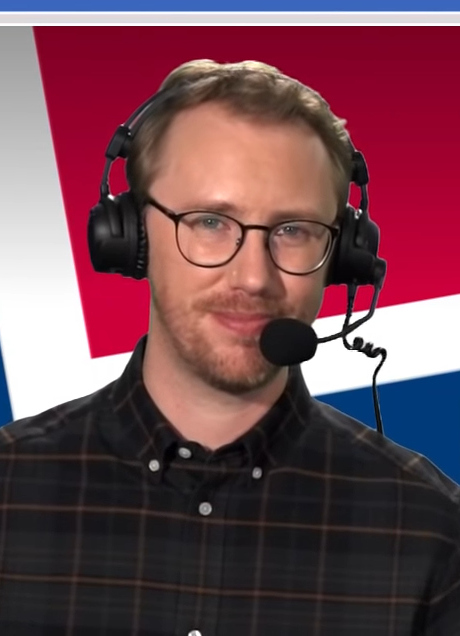
- Lonnquist in 2018

Personal information
- Name: Erik Lonnquist
- Born: 1982 or 1983 (age 43–44); Wisconsin, United States

Career information
- Games: StarCraft; League of Legends; Overwatch; Rainbow Six: Siege; Flesh and Blood
- Casting career: 2011–present

Erik Lonnquist, better known by DoA, is an American esports commentator. He began his career casting StarCraft II for companies such as GomTV in South Korea and IGN in California. He worked for OnGameNet from 2013 to 2017, casting League of Legends Champions in South Korea, where he worked with his casting partner Christopher "MonteCristo" Mykles. He was signed by Blizzard Entertainment to cast the Overwatch League from 2018 to 2019 and again in 2021. In 2022, he began hosting the Rainbow Six: Siege North American League.

== Early life and education ==
Lonnquist was born in Wisconsin and grew up as the eldest of eight siblings. His parents fostered his affinity for video games that came at an early age; his father taught him basic video game programming while he was in kindergarten, while his mother often played video games with him, such as Tetris. Lonnquist's family moved to Mankato, Minnesota in 2001, and he attended Bethany Lutheran College, where he graduated from in 2006. After college, Lonnquist worked several jobs, including working as an insurance door-to-door salesman, at a pawn shop, and as a tech support at Verizon.

== Casting career ==
=== Early career ===
Lonnquist worked for ESPNU and Fox Sports North for several years after college. Looking to get into the esports scene, he began casting replays of StarCraft matches on his personal YouTube channel. After seeing an advertisement for a position as an English-language caster in Korea, he submitted a demo of his work to the company, and in March 2011, he signed with GomTV as a caster in Seoul for the English broadcast of Global StarCraft II League's Code A matches.

In November 2011, IGN announced that they had brought on Lonnquist as a caster for the IGN Pro League (IPL), where he would be working alongside Kevin "CatsPajamas" Knocke, Alexander "HDStarCraft" Do, and Taylor "PainUser" Parsons at the IGN Headquarters in San Francisco California in early 2012. Citing that he wanted to move back to South Korea, Lonnquist left IGN in August 2012 to pursue a career with South Korean company OnGameNet (OGN) as a StarCraft II caster.

=== OnGameNet ===
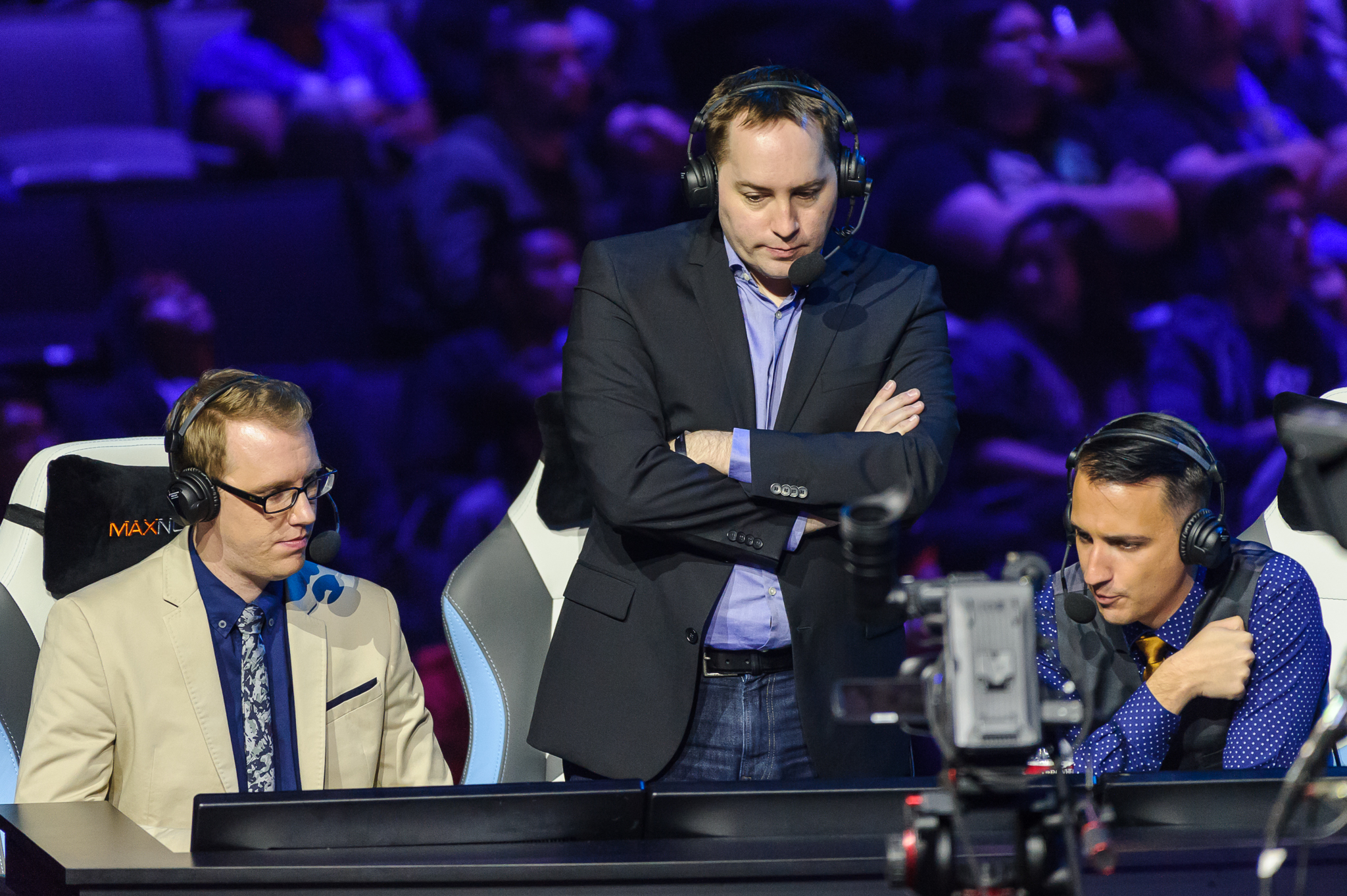
Lonnquist (left) at IEM San Jose 2015

Lonnquist returned to Korea in 2012, but he did not return to casting StarCraft II. In early 2013, OGN hired him as a play-by-play commentator for the English broadcast of League of Legends Champions, a League of Legends esports competition in South Korea, where he paired with his casting duo Christopher "MonteCristo" Mykles. The duo cast League of Legends Champions, which rebranded to League of Legends Champions Korea (LCK) in 2015, for several years, as well as other League of Legends events, including the 2015 League of Legends World Championship. In March 2016, Lonnquist, along with Mykles and Christopher "PapaSmithy" Smith, refused to cast the 2016 Mid-Season Invitational. The three were freelancers for the LCK and released a joint statement stating that the initial rate that Riot Games, the owner of League of Legends, offered was "40% to 70% of the rate received by talent for major events," and while Riot made a second offer, it was still "far below industry standard for 2016." Lonnquist also declined Riot's offer to cast the 2016 League of Legends World Championship, stating that he had other esports-related obligations in Korea, along with personal projects.

In September 2016, Lonnquist and Mykles were brought on by OGN to cast Overwatch APEX, an upcoming tournament series in South Korea for Blizzard Entertainment's Overwatch. Shortly after, the duo announced that they would not be casting the 2017 season of LCK onward. They cast Apex for two seasons, with their final broadcast being the Apex Season 2 Grand Finals.

=== Blizzard Entertainment ===
In April 2017, Lonnquist and Mykles were picked by Blizzard as both freelance casters and consultants for its upcoming Overwatch League. On January 6, 2020, Lonnquist announced that he was parting ways with the Overwatch League after two seasons; the departure effectively ended his seven-year casting partnership with Mykles. In an interview with ESPN, Lonnquist stated, "The way they're going about doing things just, unfortunately, didn't jive with me and the direction I saw for myself within the league, so it was time to go." Lonnquist continued working with Blizzard in 2020, returning to casting Hearthstone, a game that he had cast while with OGN more than four years prior, beginning with Hearthstone Masters Arlington. He returned to the Overwatch League for the 2021 season to cast late-night Eastern games alongside Andrew "ZP" Rush.

=== Ubisoft ===
In March 2022, Ubisoft announced that Lonnquist would be the desk host for the 2022 North American League season, a Rainbow Six: Siege league.

== College esports ==
In late 2020, Lonnquist became the director of esports broadcasting at his alma mater, Bethany Lutheran College.

== Awards and nominations ==
Year	Ceremony	Category	Result	Ref.
2018	Gamers' Choice Awards	Fan Favorite Esports Caster Duo	Won	
