= ELeague =

Esports league and American television show

- Founded: May 24, 2016
- Owners: Endeavor; Turner Broadcasting System
- Commissioner: Min-Sik Ko
- No. of teams: varies
- Headquarters: Atlanta, Georgia, United States
- Most recent champion: (United States) Cloud9
- Most titles: (Poland) Virtus.pro; OpTic Gaming (United States) PG | Punk (European Union) FaZe Clan (Japan) FOX | Tokido (Denmark) Astralis (United States) Cloud9
- Broadcasters: TBS; Twitch; Twitter; YouTube; Esporte Interativo
- Website: www.eleague.com

ELeague
- Genre: Esports
- Presented by: Richard Lewis (journalist)
- Original language: English

Production
- Production locations: Atlanta, Georgia, US
- Production company: TNT Sports

Original release
- Network: TBS
- Release: May 24, 2016

ELeague, shortened as EL, and stylized as ΞLEAGUE, was an esports league and American television program that aired on TBS. It was announced in September 2015 as a partnership between Turner Broadcasting and talent agency WME/IMG. The name "ELeague" was officially unveiled later that year.

Launched with Counter-Strike: Global Offensive in May 2016, the league featured 24 teams from across the world to compete in two 10-week league seasons annually, which includes a regular season, playoffs, and a championship. ELeague currently has no plans to lock teams into exclusivity, unlike the Championship Gaming Series, a previous attempt to bring professional video games to television in the United States. Matches were broadcast live on TBS every Monday night.

ELeague later shortened the number of teams in the tournament to sixteen for CS:GO. The third season of ELeague featured the popular fighting game Street Fighter. EL also featured side events, such as the Overwatch Open and the Rocket League Cup. The addition of esports programming was of part of a plan to revamp original programming for TBS. The broadcast was simultaneously available online through Twitch and YouTube, with additional content also being streamed. Matches were played at the Turner Studios facility in Atlanta.

== Season 1 ==
ELeague Season 1 began on May 24, 2016. Twenty-four teams were divided into six groups. After each team in a group plays the other three teams in its group twice, the teams are placed into a four-team, single-elimination bracket, with seeding based on the results of the group results. The winner of the group bracket moves on to the Playoffs and the runner-up moves on to the Last Chance Qualifier bracket. In addition, the top two third-place teams move on to the Last Chance Qualifier bracket. The Last Chance Qualifier teams play in an eight-team, single-elimination bracket, in which two teams move on to the Playoffs bracket. The Playoffs consisted of the six group winners—Team EnVyUs, Fnatic, Natus Vincere, Cloud9, Astralis, and Ninjas in Pyjamas—and the two teams out of the Last Chance Qualifier—mousesports and Virtus.pro.

The finals took place on July 30, 2016. It headed Fnatic and Virtus.pro, in which Virtus.pro won 2–0, and the inaugural ELeague season.

Luminosity Gaming and SK Gaming were both disqualified from ELeague. The Luminosity players, coach, and manager had all signed with SK to play with the team in the future prior to joining Luminosity. After weeks of contract disputes, Luminosity and SK settled to an agreement, resulting in the Brazilians joining SK Gaming and the Danish players forming a new team, Team X. ELeague saw this as a promotional campaign for the teams, thus, disqualifying both teams from the tournament. It was later reported that at least five ELeague participants—Cloud9, Echo Fox, NRG Esports, Team Liquid, and Team SoloMid—petitioned to prevent the current SK Gaming from inheriting Luminosity's spot in the Playoffs. SK Gaming's Epitácio "TACO" de Melo alleged that his team was not notified of the ruling before it was publicly announced.

== Season 2 ==
At the end of the season 1 finals, analyst Richard Lewis announced that the second season of ELeague would air on October 7, 2016. ELeague confirmed that the second season will once again use CS:GO.

The second season strayed away from the first season's format. Instead, it reflected the format of that of a Valve-sponsored CS:GO major, such as MLG Columbus 2016 or ESL One Cologne 2016. The season will feature open and closed qualifiers, double elimination group stages, and—like last season—a Playoffs.

The second season began on October 21, 2016. The eight teams in the playoffs were the group winners—mousesports, Virtus.pro, Astralis, and Team Dignitas—and the group runners-up—FaZe Clan, Ninjas in Pyjamas, SK Gaming, and OpTic Gaming.

The finals pitted Astralis, which defeated Ninjas in Pyjamas and SK Gaming, and OpTic Gaming, which defeated mousesports and FaZe Clan. In the end, OpTic Gaming defeated Astralis, two games to one, to win season two of ELeague.

== Season 3 – ELeague Street Fighter V Invitational ==
For the third season, ELeague invited thirty-two players from around the world to compete in this tournament. Sixteen of the players were invited based on their 2016 Capcom Pro Tour results and the other sixteen received invites from Capcom. The 32 players will advance to the regular season and then eight players will advance to the playoffs.

== Season 4 – ELeague CS:GO Premier ==
The fourth season of ELeague returned to competitive play in Counter-Strike: Global Offensive. Initially, twelve teams were invited to the competition based on previous ELeague results. Another four teams would have to qualify in their respective regional qualifiers. However, Season 2 champion OpTic Gaming only kept one of its five players, as stanislaw moved to Team Liquid shortly after winning the Season 2 title, tarik and RUSH were transferred to Cloud9, and NAF was moved to the backup position and then later joined Renegades, leaving mixwell as the only remaining member of the squad. OpTic later brought in four Europeans to fill up its lineup. Replacing the majority of the lineup would thus disqualify the team based on the ELeague ruleset. A third team from the Americas qualifier, which would later be Renegades, took its spot in the tournament.

The playoffs pitted the group winners—FaZe Clan, North, Cloud9, and Astralis—and the group runners-up—G2 Esports, Fnatic, Team EnVyUs, and Heroic.

Astralis defeated Fnatic and Cloud9 to reach the finals and FaZe Clan defeated Team EnVyUs and North on its path to the finals. Astralis kept its same lineup as it had when it won the ELeague Major 2017 while FaZe Clan brought in its new superteam and had not lost a map on LAN since losing to Gambit Esports at DreamHack Masters Malmö 2017. FaZe Clan defeated Astralis 2–0 after a huge comeback from 12–3 on the first map and dominated the second map to take home the fourth rendition of ELeague.

== Reality TV Series – ELEAGUE The Challenger: Street Fighter V ==
In 2018, ELeague announced their first-ever reality TV series, ELEAGUE The Challenger: Street Fighter V. The series featured seven invited personalities from the fighting game scene as they lived together in one house and competed against each other for a single prize. The series showcased the contestants playing against each other in the Capcom fighting game Street Fighter V, as well as the drama and interaction between them as they spent their days living under one roof. It premiered on April 20, 2018, and consisted of five episodes. The people invited to appear as contestants in the show included LowTierGod, Gllty and RobTV. Rapper Lupe Fiasco also appeared on the show as a special guest.

== ELeague CS:GO Premier 2018 ==
In the last day of the ELeague Major: Boston 2018, host Richard Lewis announced that a new Premier season of ELeague would debut on July 21, 2018.

== Counter-Strike Majors ==
=== ELeague Major 2017 ===
On September 27, 2016, Valve announced the tenth major in CS:GO and the first major of 2017: the ELeague Major 2017, also known as ELeague Atlanta 2017. Like other majors, the top eight teams from the last major, ESL One Cologne 2016, will be invited to the major and eight other teams will play through a qualifier. ELeague Major 2017 took place from January 22 to 29, making it the longest-running major with eight days. Previous majors lasted three to six days.

Like previous majors, eight teams received an automatic bid based on their top eight placement at the previous major, ESL One Cologne 2016, and another eight teams qualify through the Major Qualifier. The group stage format differed completely from previous majors, as the major would use a 16-team Swiss system rather than the four group GSL system.

The top eight teams in this major were Natus Vincere, Virtus.pro, Astralis, and North, FaZe Clan, Fnatic, SK Gaming, and Gambit Gaming, who were called Legends by making the top eight.

In the quarterfinals, Astralis defeated Natus Vincere, Fnatic defeated Gambit Gaming, Virtus.pro defeated North, and SK Gaming defeated FaZe Clan. In the semifinals, Astralis defeated Fnatic after a close game one and a clean game two. Virtus.pro scraped by a somewhat crippled SK Gaming in a close 2–0 set.

The finals pitted Astralis, who was in its first major championships, and Virtus.pro, who was in its second and had one major title under its belt. In a close and intense three-game set, Astralis defeated Virtus.pro—12–16, 16–14, 16–14—to win its first-ever major title. Markus "Kjaerbye" Kjærbye was named the MVP of the major.

=== ELeague Major: Boston 2018 ===
On October 5, 2017, Valve announced that ELeague would host the first major of 2018 and the twelfth major in CS:GO history: ELeague Major: Boston 2018. Unlike past majors, Boston major featured 24 teams as Valve expanded the format to include what was formerly known as "The Major Qualifier", now rebranded as "The New Challengers Stage". This major was the first in CS:GO major tournaments' history to take place in two different cities. The group stage took place in Turner Studios, where all ELeague season matches were played, in Atlanta from January 19 to 22. The playoffs took place in Boston from January 26 to 28 at the Agganis Arena in Boston University.

Only two Legends made the playoffs, as SK Gaming and Fnatic made it into the top eight. New Legends were G2 Esports, FaZe Clan, Natus Vincere, Quantum Bellator Fire, mousesports, and Cloud9. The grand finals put the pressure on the tournament favorites FaZe Clan, which defeated mousesports and Natus Vincere, and the dark horse Cloud9, which upset G2 Esports and SK Gaming. In what was being called one of the best series of all time in Global Offensive, Cloud9 upset FaZe Clan—14–16, 16–10, 22–19—to take home the Boston 2018 major. In addition, Cloud9 became the first ever North American team to win a major title.

== Other events ==
=== Overwatch Open ===
In July 2016, ELeague announced the first Overwatch Open, starting in August 2016, with a total prize pool of $300,000. Sixteen teams took part in the main tournament, eight from North America and eight from Europe, and many more took part in the qualifier for the main tournament. The winners of each continent faced off in the ELeague Arena. The tournament took place between August 1 and September 30, 2016. In North America, the final four teams were Team EnVyUs, Cloud9, Fnatic, and NRG Esports. EnVyUs defeated Fnatic 3–1 in the North American final. In Europe, the final four teams were Ninjas in Pyjamas, Misfits, Rogue, and FaZe Clan. Misfits defeated Rogue 3–2 in the Europe finals. In the grand finals, Misfits defeated EnVyUs three games to one to take home one third of the prize pool.

=== Injustice 2 World Championship ===
ELeague hosted the Injustice 2 World Championships that started on October 27, 2017, and will end on November 10, 2017. Sixteen players qualified for the tournament and competed for US$250,000.

Qualifying event	Qualifying root	Qualified players
Proseries Injustice 2 2017	Top 8	ALG | Dragon; F3 | DR Gross (Canada) PG | Hayatei (Canada) BC | Honeybee (United States) Noble | Semiij (United States) FOX | Sonic Fox (Bahrain) | Tekken Master (United States) FOX | Theo
Gamestop Hometown Heroes Injustice 2	Top 2	(United States) ER | Knicks (United States) Nubcakes
Injustice 2 Path To Pro	Top 2	(Russia) Bombooka (France) Happypow
Liga Latina Injustice 2 2017	Top 2	(Chile) VX | HeeyGe0rge (Brazil) VX | Killer Xenox
The ELeague Last Chance Qualifier	Top 2	(United Kingdom) PxP | A F0xy Grandpa (United States) Circa | ForeverKing

Players were separated into two groups of eight. Each group would be an eight player, best of five, double elimination bracket. Only two players from each group would make it to the main playoffs. In the playoffs, players played in a four player, best of five, double elimination bracket. In the end, Dragon defeated A F0xy Grandpa from the winner's side of the bracket to take home $150,000 of the $250,000 prize pool home.

=== ELeague Cup: Rocket League ===
ELeague announced the Rocket League Cup that would start on December 1, 2017, and end on December 3, 2017. The studio invited eight premier teams from around the world that included Chiefs Esports Club, Cloud9, G2 Esports, Gale Force eSports, Ghost Gaming, Method, Mock-It eSports, and PSG eSports. The teams competed for a $150,000 prize pool.

In a tense grand finals between G2 Esports and Gale Force eSports, G2 was able to take down the then current world champions in a close best-of-seven series, four games to three, to take home $70,000 of the $150,000 prize pool.
