= MonteCristo =

American esports personality

Christopher Mykles
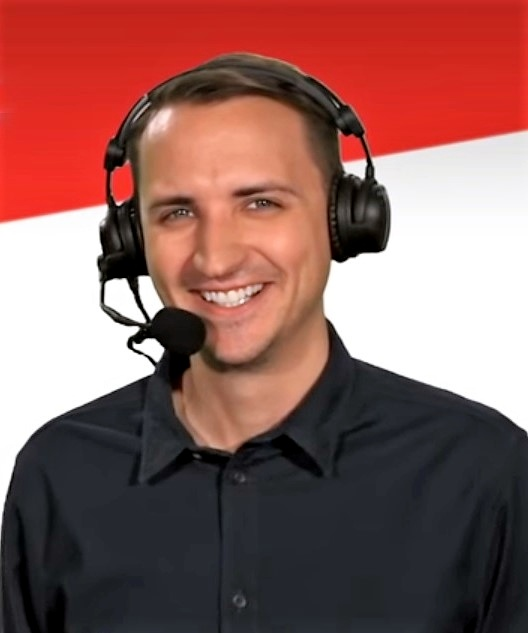
- Mykles in 2018
- Other name: MonteCristo
- Title: Vice president of B Site; Commissioner of Flashpoint
- Spouse: Susie Kim (m. 2017)
- Sports commentary career
- Sport: Esports
- Employer: OnGameNet (2012–2016); Blizzard (2017–2019)

Team history
- 2013–2014: Counter Logic Gaming (coach)
- 2015–2016: Renegades (owner)

Christopher Kjell Mykles, better known by his nickname MonteCristo, is an American esports executive and former color commentator, analyst, and organization owner. Mykles is a co-founder and part owner of Last Free Nation, an esports content creation network he launched alongside esports journalist Duncan "Thorin" Shields.

He rose to prominence whilst working in the League of Legends esports scene, most notably as an English-language commentator for OnGameNet, the broadcasting company of the LCK, from 2012 through 2016. He also worked on the broadcast team for the League of Legends World Championship from 2013 to 2015. In 2013 and 2014, he was a coach for Counter Logic Gaming, and from 2015 to 2016 he owned Renegades. He was employed as a shoutcaster for the Overwatch League from 2017 to 2019. In 2020, he became the commissioner of Flashpoint, a Counter-Strike: Global Offensive league, and a vice president of the league's parent company.

== Coaching and ownership ==
=== Counter Logic Gaming ===
On July 24, 2013, Mykles became a coach for Counter Logic Gaming. On September 5, 2014, Mykles left his coaching position at CLG.

=== Renegades ===
On June 22, 2015, Mykles became a co-owner of LA Renegades. On May 8, 2016, Riot Games announced that Team Impulse and Renegades were banned from the LCS. Additionally, Mykles would be banned from all Riot-sponsored activities as a team owner or manager for a year, though he could continue casting for those events. The punishment stemmed from charges of not properly disclosing team ownership, misleading player trades, and player mistreatment. Renegades later sold their LoL team to Team EnVyUs.

== Broadcasting ==
Mykles's first involvement with esports was as a volunteer writer for WCReplays, a Warcraft 3 replays site. He began shoutcasting for WCReplays with David "Phreak" Turley, later attesting that casting came naturally to him due to many years of stage performance. During his involvement with Warcraft 3, he managed a professional team with Verge Gaming and joined the Team Sportscast Network, a now defunct esports shoutcasting organization. He later accepted a full-time contract casting position at OnGameNet as an English-language caster for League of Legends Champions Korea. Mykles, Erik "DoA" Lonnquist, and Christopher "PapaSmithy" Smith declined to commentate at the 2016 Mid-Season Invitational in Shanghai because of a wage dispute with Riot.

In April 2017, Mykles and Lonnquist announced they would be moving from South Korea to the United States to serve as shoutcasters for the Overwatch League. After two seasons with the league, Mykles announced that he would no longer be casting for the OWL ahead of the 2020 season.

== Flashpoint ==
Mykles joined B Site, a team-owned producer for the Counter-Strike: Global Offensive league Flashpoint, and in June 2020, he was named as the league commissioner for Flashpoint and the vice president for brand for B Site.

== Awards and nominations ==
Year	Ceremony	Category	Result	Ref.
2013	onGamers League of Legends Awards	Caster of the Year	Won	
2015	The Game Awards 2015	Trending Gamer	Nominated	
2016	2016 Esports Awards	Esports Broadcaster of the Year	Nominated	
2018	2018 Esports Awards	Esports Broadcaster of the Year	Nominated	
2018	Gamers' Choice Awards	Fan Favorite Esports Caster Duo	Won	
2018	Stockholm International Esports Awards	On Camera Talent of the Year	Nominated	
2019	2019 Esports Awards	Esports Caster of the Year	Nominated	

== Personal life ==
On November 29, 2018, he gained notability on social media after inviting other esports personalities to an event he was hosting titled "Esports Mystery", which was later revealed to be his wedding with Susie "LilSusie" Kim. He later revealed that they had been married since June 2017, but wanted to wait before announcing their marriage to the public.
