= MadLife =

South Korean streamer, esports caster and former professional League of Legends player

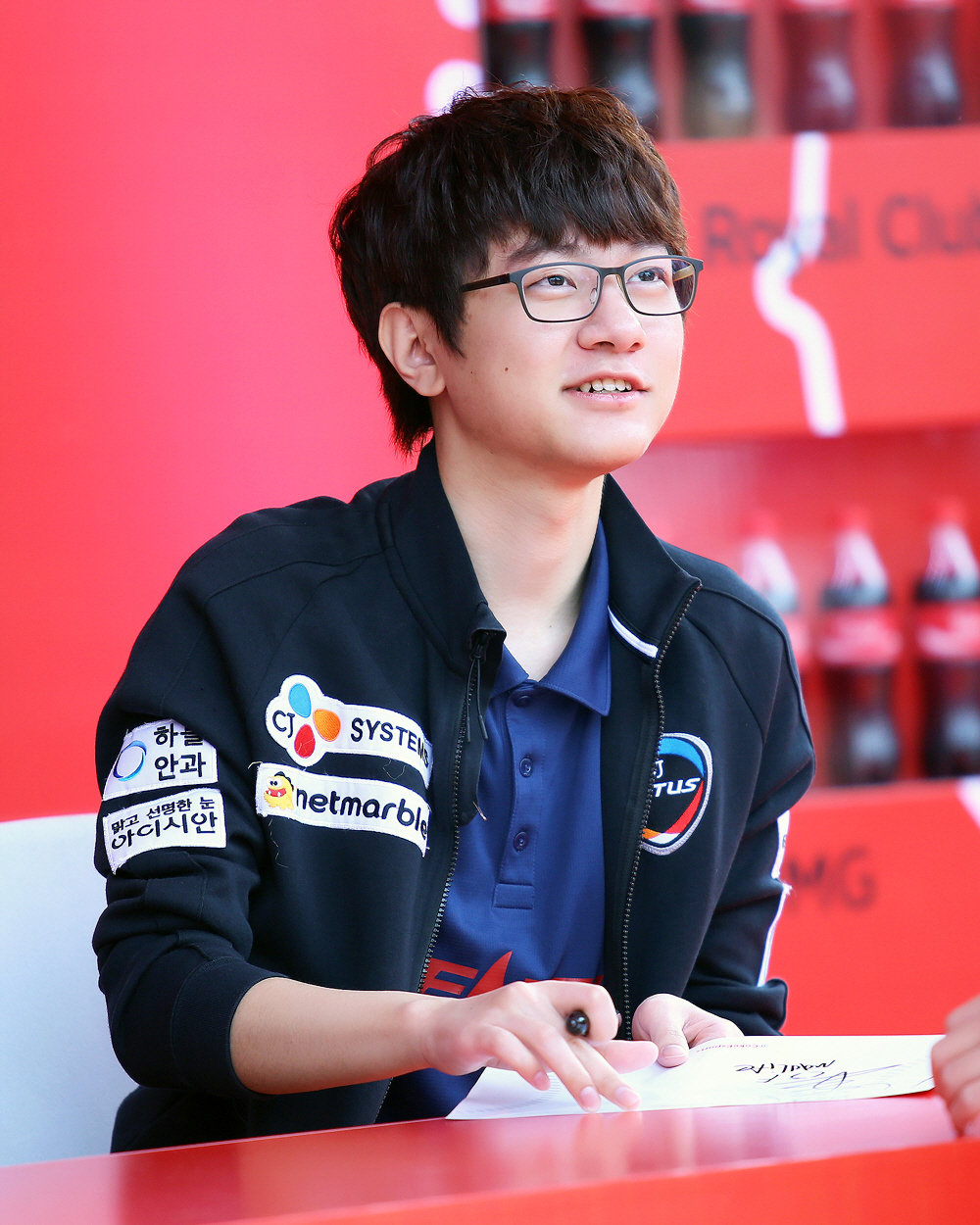
- MadLife at the 2014 World Championship

Personal information
- Name: 홍민기 (Hong Min-gi)
- Nationality: South Korean

Career information
- Game: League of Legends
- Playing career: 2011–2018
- Role: Support

Team history
- 2011–2012: MiG Frost
- 2012–2013: Azubu Frost
- 2013–2016: CJ Entus
- 2017: Gold Coin United

Career highlights and awards
- LoL Invitational champion (2012); LCK champion (Summer 2012); All-Star Shanghai champion (2013)

Hong Min-gi (Korean: 홍민기), better known as MadLife (Korean: 매드라이프), is a South Korean video game streamer, esports caster and former professional League of Legends player. During his career as a professional League of Legends player, MadLife was known internationally for his mastery of the champions Thresh and Blitzcrank. He is also a Worlds finalist, having qualified in 2012 while on Azubu Frost.

== Career ==
MadLife began his professional career in Season 2, joining Korean team MiG Frost. The team's main sponsor became streaming service Azubu in mid-2012 and was renamed Azubu Frost. MadLife and his teammates qualified for the Season 2 World Championship after reverse sweeping CLG Europe in the finals of The Champions Summer 2012. Azubu Frost made it all the way to the World Championship finals, where they lost to Taipei Assassins, finishing runner-up.

MadLife stayed with Azubu Frost after Season 2 and continued to play for all its later successors, gaining international notoriety for his plays on Thresh and Blitzcrank while on CJ Entus. In late 2016 he announced his departure from the South Korean League of Legends scene and his signing with NA CS team Gold Coin United. He was, however, unable to fly to the United States and play with the team during the first few weeks of competition due to visa issues. After two consecutive failed attempts to qualify for the NA LCS, MadLife left Gold Coin United in November 2017.

Upon returning to South Korea in early 2018, MadLife received multiple offers from domestic teams, as well as from teams in China, Europe and Turkey. He turned them all down and instead focused on streaming full-time. MadLife subsequently announced his retirement from professional play on June 19, 2018.

Hong has been acted as an esports Sports commentator since 2019.
