= Renegades (esports) =

American esports organization

- Founded: March 9, 2015
- Disbanded: October 2022 (de facto)
- Location: Detroit, Michigan
- Owner: Jonas Jerebko
- Website: www.renegadespro.com

Renegades (Note: Previously known as the Detroit Renegades and LA Renegades.) was an American esports organization. It had teams competing in multiple titles, including Call of Duty, Counter-Strike: Global Offensive, Fortnite, Overwatch, Super Smash Bros., Rocket League, iRacing and Valorant.

Renegades began as a League of Legends team named Misfits that qualified for the 2016 North American League of Legends Championship Series (NA LCS), but its NA LCS slot was sold to Team EnVyUs in 2016 after its owners were banned from NA LCS team ownership.

In September 2016, professional basketball player Jonas Jerebko purchased the rights to the Renegades franchise.

In October 2022, Renegades released its last team (an Apex Legends roster) and suspended its operations indefinitely.

== Former divisions ==
=== Call of Duty ===
On August 30, 2016, Renegades signed the former members of Dream Team known as Ground Zero. KiLLa, Chino, Sender and Diabolic had already qualified for the 2016 Call of Duty World League Championship by earning enough CWL Championship Points from Stage 1 and Stage 2 of the CWL. At the event, the team lost their first two matches in Group D to Epsilon eSports and Team Allegiance and then forfeited their match against PuLse Gaming after KiLLa didn't show up for the series. Renegades finished 25th–32nd. KiLLa was dropped less than a week later and was replaced by Ivy the following day.

=== Counter-Strike: Global Offensive ===
Renegades acquired the Australian CS:GO team Vox Eminor on June 19, 2015. Renegades were the first team announced to be participating in the ELeague. After placing second at IEM Taipei 2016, Renegades announced that Karlo "USTILO" Pivac would be replacing Luke "Havoc" Paton in their starting roster. On June 17, 2016, Chad "SPUNJ" Burchill announced his retirement from competitive Counter-Strike. Ricky "Rickeh" Mulholland was announced as SPUNJ's replacement on July 12, 2016. Following Rickeh's departure to Counter Logic Gaming, Renegades first added Nemanja "nexa" Isaković to their roster for a brief four-month stint, before releasing him. As their new fifth, they acquired David "Jayzwalkingz" Kempner on a trial-basis from Fnatic's academy team, before releasing him after a month. On September 1, 2017, Keith "NAF" Markovic was added as the fifth player from OpTic Gaming. He transferred to Team Liquid on February 5, 2018 and was replaced by Joakim "jkaem" Myrbostad three days later, as a long-term stand-in. After some time of rumoring it was confirmed on October 31, 2019, that the then-current Renegades team, containing AZR, jks, Gratisfaction, jkaem, Liazz and kassad is being transferred to 100 Thieves.

In December 2019, Renegades signed the roster of Grayhound Gaming, which consisted of Chris "dexter" Nong, Oliver "DickStacy" Tierney, Liam "malta" Schembri, Simon "Sico" Williams, and Joshua "INS" Potter. On January 8, 2020, DickStacy departed from the squad, and Jordan "Hatz" Bajic was brought in as his replacement three days later. On February 11, 2021, Christopher "dexter" Nong left the team to join mousesports. Following Nong's departure, Alistair "aliStair" Johnston joined from ORDER, with IGL duties going to Joshua "INS" Potter. On June 29, 2021, David "Kingfisher" Kingsford joined as the team's head coach.

They recently placed first at the Oceanian IEM fall 2021 tournament, thus securing enough RMR points to qualify themselves to compete in the 2021 Stockholm Major, the first Major Championship in two years.

On June 3, 2022, Renegades announced that they would be dropping their CSGO team, with Australian team ORDER picking up the roster

=== Gigantic ===
Renegades acquired the Gigantic roster known as Team ApeX on November 9, 2015.

=== Halo ===
Renegades acquired the team "Leftovers" on January 18, 2016. Following the Halo World Championship, Spartan and StelluR left Renegades for Team Liquid.

=== League of Legends ===
Renegades was initially announced as an unnamed Challenger team in early March 2015 by Chris Badawi. The team's first roster included mid laner Alex Ich and jungler Crumbzz, along with support Remilia from solo queue. After tryouts for the remaining two positions, top laner RF Legendary and AD carry Intense joined the team, and they named themselves Misfits. In April, Misfits participated in the AlphaDraft Challenger League (ADCL) and dropped only a single game during the regular season round robin, finishing 11–1 in first place. After the ADCL regular season ended, Intense left the team. Stixxay joined as a substitute AD carry and played with the team for the bracket stage of the ADCL, and they won the tournament, beating Frank Fang Gaming in the finals.

Misfits played under the name The Expendables6 on the Challenger Ladder and were in third place at the cut-off date for NA Challenger Series (NACS) Summer Qualifier participation. Danish AD Carry Jebus joined as the team's final permanent member, replacing Stixxay, but his first appearance was delayed due to visa issues. In the NACS Qualifier, Misfits played against Also Known As, Team Liquid Academy, and Magnetic, using two different substitute AD carries — Maplestreet against Also Known As and Magnetic, and Nien against Team Liquid Academy. Misfits swept their competition with three consecutive 2–0 victories and qualified for the Summer Season. The team shortly thereafter renamed to Renegades, with caster and former coach Chris "MonteCristo" Mykles joining as the team's co-owner.

Prior to the start of the Challenger Series, Riot Games published a competitive ruling regarding team owner Chris Badawi claiming that he had inappropriately attempted to persuade otherwise contracted players to join the team (then Misfits), including Team Liquid's Quas and Keith. The ruling stated that if Renegades were to qualify for the LCS, Badawi would have to drop his ownership stake in the team. Multiple parties reacted to the ruling, including MonteCristo and Badawi himself, who both protested the fairness of the ruling; and team owners and managers Steve "LiQuiD112" Arhancet of Team Liquid, Reginald of Team SoloMid, and Jack Etienne of Cloud9, who spoke out in support of it. Ultimately Badawi was banned from participating with the team in an official capacity and was forced to divulge his ownership stake in the team if they qualified for the LCS.

Renegades finished the Challenger Series regular season with an 8–2 record and in second place, after losing a tiebreaker to Team Coast. However, in the playoffs, they defeated Imagine 2–1 and then Coast 3–2, earning a berth in the 2016 NA LCS Spring Season. Remilia became the first woman to qualify for the LCS in the league's history.

In October 2015, Maplestreet stepped down from the starting roster. The organization announced open tryouts for his replacement.

In January 2016, Renegades picked up a team in the European Challenger Series, dubbed Renegades Banditos. The team consisted of Erik "Tabzz" van Helvert, Matthew "Impaler" Taylor, Marc "Caedrel" Lamont, Barney "Alphari" Morris, and Aleksi "Hiiva" Kaikkonen, with subs Marcin "Xaxus" Maczka and Divit "DxAlchemist" Bui.

In April 2016, the team was at the center of an ownership and management controversy, which resulted in the team being banned from the NA LCS and owners Chris Badawi and Christopher "MonteCristo" Mykles selling the team to NBA player Jonas Jerebko. Following the transfer, the team was rebranded as Detroit Renegades.

Renegades' League of Legends roster was disbanded on May 8, 2016, after they allegedly "violated the competitive ban against Chris Badawi, misrepresented their relationship with TDK, and compromised player welfare and safety". The roster was sold eventually to Team EnVyUs on May 18, 2016.

=== Rocket League ===
Renegade first entered the Rocket League scene in July 2017, picking up the former Selfless Gaming roster after the owners decided to step away from the organization. Their first season in the RLCS saw Renegades go 1–6 in League Play, finishing last in the North American region and placing them in the promotion/relegation tournament. However, the team was able to keep their spot in the top division after defeating both Fibeon eSports and Out of Style in the tournament. Before the start of Season 5, the team decided not to re-sign with the org. Renegades would sit out the next couple seasons of RLCS, returning to the scene halfway through Season 7 by acquiring the former Chiefs Esports roster.
