= OnGamers =

Online magazine

onGamers
- Website type: Online magazine
- Available in: English
- Owner: CBS Interactive
- Website: www.ongamers.com
- Commercial: Yes
- Registration: Optional
- Launched: November 7, 2013
- Current status: Discontinued

onGamers was an online magazine focused upon professional electronic sports (esports) coverage. The onGamers platform was originally a part of GameSpot as the esports division, which was also owned by owned by CBS Interactive.

== History ==
Development of the onGamers project began on July 16, 2013, when the former chief marketing officer of SteelSeries, Kim Rom, was appointed to the position of Vice President of eSports at CBS Interactive. The onGamers website was released in a beta version on November 7, 2013, with the announcement of the retirement of the CBS eSports brand and the recruitment of a content creation staff.

== Violation ==
After breaching the terms of the social news site reddit by engaging in vote manipulation, the site was banned from the service for a minimum of a year. Following the ban, the site experienced a 50% drop in visits, and was 'on the brink of disaster'.

== Rebranding ==
In December 2015, onGamers was quietly retired, with the site and all articles redirecting to GameSpot's League of Legends section. All online properties were also rebranded as G|League.

== See also ==
- Adventure Gamers
- Inside Mac Games
