= 2017 in esports =

List of events in 2017 in eSports (also known as professional gaming).

== Calendar of events ==
=== Tournaments ===
Date	Game	Event	Location	Winner(s)
January 5–8	Counter-Strike: Global Offensive	ESEA S23 Global	Burbank, United States	Rogue
January 6–8	Dota 2	ESL One Genting 2017	Arena of Stars – Genting Highlands, Malaysia	Digital Chaos
January 12–15	Counter-Strike: Global Offensive	WESG	Changzhou, China	Team EnvyUs
January 13–15	Counter-Strike: Global Offensive	DreamHack Leipzig	Leipzig, Germany	FlipSid3 Tactics
January 20–22	Super Smash Bros. Melee; Super Smash Bros. for Wii U Super Smash Bros.	Genesis 4	San Jose Convention Center (January 20 and 21); City National Civic (January 22); San Jose, United States	Armada (SSBM); MKLeo (SSB4); Alvin (SSB)
January 22–29	Counter-Strike: Global Offensive	ELEAGUE Major 2017	Fox Theater − Atlanta, United States	Astralis
March 10–12	Killer Instinct	Killer Instinct World Cup 2017	Tobin Center − San Antonio, United States	Sleep
April 27–30	Dota 2	Kiev Major	National Palace of Arts – Kyiv, Ukraine	OG
April 28–30	Counter Strike: Global Offensive; StarCraft II; Street Fighter V Super Smash Bros.	DreamHack Austin 2017	Austin Convention Center − Austin, United States	Various
May 25–28	Dota 2	Manila Masters 2017	Mall of Asia Arena − Pasay, The Philippines	Evil Geniuses
July 14–16	Various fighting games	Evolution 2017	Mandalay Bay − Las Vegas, United States	Various
July 16–23	Counter-Strike: Global Offensive	PGL Major 2017	Tauron Arena − Kraków, Poland	Gambit Esports
August 7–12	Dota 2	The International 2017	KeyArena – Seattle, United States	Team Liquid
September 1–3	Mobile Legends: Bang Bang	Mobile Legends Southeast Asia Cup (MSC) 2017	Jakarta, Indonesia	IDONOTSLEEP
September 1-October 13	Counter-Strike: Global Offensive	ELEAGUE CS:GO Premier	Turner Studios – Atlanta, United States	FaZe Clan
September 23—November 4	League of Legends	2017 League of Legends World Championship	Wuhan Sports Center Gymnasium - Wuhan, China (group stage); Guangzhou Gymnasium - Guangzhou, China (quarterfinals); Shanghai Oriental Sports Center - Shanghai, China (semifinals); Beijing National Stadium - Beijing, China (finals)	Samsung Galaxy
October 23–29	Counter-Strike: Global Offensive	Epicenter: CSGO 2017	Yubileyny Sports Palace – Saint Petersburg, Russia	SK Gaming
October 26–29	Dota 2	ESL One Hamburg 2017	Barclaycard Arena – Hamburg, Germany	Virtus.pro
November 14–19	Counter-Strike: Global Offensive; PlayerUnknown's Battlegrounds	Intel Extreme Masters Season XII – Oakland	Oracle Arena – Oakland, United States	Ninjas in Pyjamas (CS:GO) *aAa* Gaming (PUBG)
November 25–26	F1 2017	2017 FIA Formula One eSports Series	Yas Marina Circuit – Abu Dhabi, United Arab Emirates	Brendon Leigh (BAM Leigh)
December 1–4	Counter-Strike: Global Offensive; Dota 2 H1Z1; Hearthstone; Quake Champions; Super Smash Bros. Melee	DreamHack Winter 2017	Elmia Fair – Jönköping, Sweden	Natus Vincere (CS:GO); Team Secret (Dota 2); Impact Gaming (H1Z1); Zumpp (Hearthstone); DaHanG (Quake); Armada (SSMB)
December 8–10	Marvel vs. Capcom: Infinite	Battle for the Stones Finals	Hilton Anaheim (December 8); Anaheim Convention Center (December 10); Anaheim, United States	Cloud805
December 9–10	Street Fighter V	Capcom Cup 2017	Hilton Anaheim (December 9); Anaheim Convention Center (December 10); Anaheim, United States	MenaRD

== Awards ==
- Esports Industry Awards 2017

== Television series ==
- The King's Avatar (donghua)
