= 2017 in video games =

2017 saw the release of numerous video games as well as other developments in the video game industry. The Nintendo Switch console was released in 2017, which sold more than 14 million units by the end of the year, exceeding the under-performing Wii U lifetime sales. This has helped to revitalize Nintendo, along with the "retro" Super NES Classic Edition console, the refreshed New Nintendo 2DS XL handheld and a strategy for mobile gaming. Microsoft also released the higher-powered Xbox One X targeted for 4K resolutions and virtual reality support.

Series with new installments in 2017 include Assassin's Creed, Bomberman, Bubsy, Call of Duty, Crash Bandicoot, Danganronpa, Dawn of War, Destiny, Digimon, Dragon Quest, Doom, Dynasty Warriors, The Evil Within, Final Fantasy, Fire Emblem, Forza Motorsport, Gran Turismo, Gravity Rush, Halo Wars, Injustice, Kingdom Hearts, Kirby, The Legend of Zelda, Life Is Strange, Marvel vs. Capcom, Mass Effect, Metroid, Need for Speed, Nier, Persona, Planescape: Torment, Pokémon, Prey, Professor Layton, Resident Evil, Sniper Elite, Sniper: Ghost Warrior, Sonic the Hedgehog, Splatoon, Star Wars Battlefront, Super Mario, Tekken, Tom Clancy's Ghost Recon, Uncharted, Wipeout, Wolfenstein, WWE 2K, Xenoblade, Yakuza and Yoshi.

In addition, 2017 saw the introduction of several new properties, including Arms, Cuphead, Doki Doki Literature Club!, ELEX, Fortnite, Hellblade, Hollow Knight, Horizon, Nioh, and PlayerUnknown's Battlegrounds.

== Financial performance ==
According to analyst firm Newzoo, the video game industry had $116.6 billion in global revenues, a 10% growth from 2016. This growth was primarily driven by mobile gaming, as 43% ($50.4 billion) of those revenues came from this sector, a growth of 23.3% from 2016. Of the remaining, 29% (US$33.3 billion) came from consoles hardware and games, and 28% ($32.3 billion) from personal computer games. SuperData similarly estimated the global video game market in 2017 was around $108.4 billion, driven heavily by free-to-play mobile and computer games. Analyst firm Sensor Tower, which tracks revenue within the mobile industry, reported that of the $58.6 billion in total revenues in 2017, $48.3 billion came from mobile games.

Within the United States, the video industry grew from 2016 by 18% to a total revenue of $36 billion, with $6.9 billion from hardware sales (gaining 19% from 2016) and $29.1 billion (18%) from software and microtransactions, according to NPD Group and the Entertainment Software Association. Further, $10.7 billion was spent on mobile gaming in 2017 in the United States, according to Sensor Tower.

=== Highest-grossing games ===
The following were 2017's top ten highest-grossing video games in terms of worldwide revenue (including physical sales, digital purchases, microtransactions, free-to-play and pay-to-play) across all platforms (including mobile, PC and console platforms). Six of the top ten highest-grossing games are published or owned by Tencent, including the top three titles.

Rank	Game	Revenue	Publisher(s)	Genre	Platform(s)	Business model	Ref.
1	Honor of Kings / Arena of Valor	$2,400,000,000	Tencent	MOBA	Mobile	Free-to-play	
2	League of Legends	$2,100,000,000	Riot Games / Tencent	MOBA	PC	Free-to-play	
3	Dungeon Fighter Online (DFO)	$1,900,000,000	Nexon / Tencent	Beat 'em up	PC	Free-to-play	
4	Monster Strike	$1,641,000,000	Mixi	Physics	Mobile	Free-to-play	
5	Crossfire	$1,605,000,000	Smilegate / Tencent	FPS	PC, Mobile	Free-to-play	(Note: Crossfire: PC – $1.4 billion; Crossfire Mobile – $205 million)
6	Fantasy Westward Journey	$1,500,000,000	NetEase	MMORPG	Mobile	Free-to-play	
7	Clash Royale	$1,200,000,000	Supercell (Tencent)	Strategy	Mobile	Free-to-play	
8	Clash of Clans	$1,200,000,000	Supercell (Tencent)	Strategy	Mobile	Free-to-play	
9	Call of Duty: WWII	$1,000,000,000	Activision (Activision Blizzard)	FPS	Console, PC	Buy-to-play	
10	Fate/Grand Order (FGO)	$982,000,000	Aniplex (Sony Music Entertainment Japan)	RPG	Mobile	Free-to-play	

=== Highest-grossing free-to-play games ===
The following were the top ten highest-grossing free-to-play games in 2017. Six of the top ten titles were published or owned by Tencent, including the top three titles.

Rank	Game	Revenue	Publisher(s)	Genre	Platform(s)	Ref.
1	Honor of Kings / Arena of Valor	$2,400,000,000	Tencent	MOBA	Mobile	
2	League of Legends	$2,100,000,000	Riot Games / Tencent	MOBA	PC	
3	Dungeon Fighter Online (DFO)	$1,900,000,000	Nexon / Tencent	Beat 'em up	PC	
4	Monster Strike	$1,641,000,000	Mixi	Physics	Mobile	
5	Crossfire	$1,605,000,000	Smilegate / Tencent	FPS	PC, Mobile	
6	Fantasy Westward Journey	$1,500,000,000	NetEase	MMORPG	Mobile	
7	Clash Royale	$1,200,000,000	Supercell (Tencent)	Strategy	Mobile	
8	Clash of Clans	$1,200,000,000	Supercell (Tencent)	Strategy	Mobile	
9	Fate/Grand Order (FGO)	$982,000,000	Aniplex (Sony Music Entertainment Japan)	RPG	Mobile	
10	Lineage 2: Revolution	$980,000,000	Netmarble Games	MMORPG	Mobile	

Sensor Tower reported that the highest-grossing mobile games were the free-to-play titles Monster Strike, Honor of Kings, Fate/Grand Order, Clash Royale, and Candy Crush Saga. The top-grossing mobile games in the United States were Candy Crush Saga, Game of War: Fire Age, Clash of Clans, Mobile Strike, and Clash Royale.

=== Best-selling premium games ===
The following were the top ten best-selling premium games (including buy-to-play titles) in 2017. Four of the top ten titles were published by Nintendo.

Rank	Game	Units sold	Revenue	Genre	Publisher(s)	Platform(s)
1	PlayerUnknown's Battlegrounds (PUBG)	30,000,000	$900,000,000	Battle royale	PUBG Corporation (Bluehole)	
2	Call of Duty: WWII	< 19,630,000	$1,000,000,000	FPS	Activision (Activision Blizzard)	
3	Grand Theft Auto V / Online	15,000,000	$521,000,000	Action-adventure	Rockstar Games (Take-Two Interactive)	
4	Super Mario Odyssey	9,070,000	Unknown	Platformer	Nintendo	NS
5	Star Wars: Battlefront II	9,000,000	Unknown	Shooter	Electronic Arts	
6	Pokémon Sun / Moon / Ultra Sun / Ultra Moon	8,530,000 (Note: Pokémon Sun / Moon / Ultra Sun / Ultra Moon: Pokémon Ultra Sun / Ultra Moon – 7.17 million; Pokémon Sun / Moon – 1.36 million)	Unknown	RPG	Nintendo / The Pokémon Company	3DS
7	The Legend of Zelda: Breath of the Wild	7,780,000	Unknown	Action-adventure	Nintendo	
8	Mario Kart 8 / Deluxe	7,470,000 (Note: Mario Kart 8 / Deluxe: Mario Kart 8 Deluxe (Switch) – 7.33 million; Mario Kart 8 (Wii U) – 140,000)	Unknown	Kart racing	Nintendo	
9	FIFA 17	Unknown	$409,000,000	Sports	EA Sports (Electronic Arts)	
10	Overwatch	Unknown	$382,000,000	Shooter	Blizzard Entertainment (Activision Blizzard)	WIN

=== Best-selling games by country ===
The following were 2017's top ten best-selling video games by country, in terms of software units sold (excluding microtransactions and free-to-play titles) on PC and console platforms, for the United States, Japan, and United Kingdom.

Rank	Japan	United Kingdom	United States (Note: Not including PlayerUnknown's Battlegrounds, as PUBG Corporation did not share its sales figures with the NPD Group.)
1	Monster Hunter XX	FIFA 18	Call of Duty: WWII
2	Pokémon Sun / Moon	Call of Duty: WWII	NBA 2K18
3	Mario Kart 8 Deluxe	Grand Theft Auto V	Destiny 2 (Note: Not including PC digital sales)
4	The Legend of Zelda: Breath of the Wild	Assassin's Creed Origins	Madden NFL 18
5	Super Mario Maker	Star Wars Battlefront II	The Legend of Zelda: Breath of the Wild (Note: Not including digital sales)
6	Biohazard 7: Resident Evil	Crash Bandicoot N.Sane Trilogy	Grand Theft Auto V
7	NieR: Automata	Destiny 2	Tom Clancy's Ghost Recon: Wildlands
8	Momotaro Dentetsu 2017: Tachiagare Nippon!	Gran Turismo Sport	Star Wars: Battlefront II
9	Yo-kai Watch 3: Sukiyaki	Tom Clancy's Ghost Recon: Wildlands	Super Mario Odyssey
10	1-2-Switch	Horizon: Zero Dawn	Mario Kart 8 Deluxe

== Top-rated games ==
Top-rated games in 2017 included The Legend of Zelda: Breath of the Wild, Super Mario Odyssey, Persona 5, Divinity: Original Sin II, and Horizon Zero Dawn. One of the most influential games of 2017 was PlayerUnknown's Battlegrounds, which was released in early access for personal computers in March 2017 and by the end of the year had sold 30 million units, breaking several concurrent player count records and established the battle royale genre. The highest-grossing game of the year was the mobile game Honor of Kings, known as Arena of Valor internationally. Considerable debate was held over the use of loot boxes in video games and whether they constituted gambling, coming to a head with the release of Star Wars Battlefront II.

=== Critically acclaimed games ===
Metacritic is an aggregator of video game journalism reviews. It generally considers expansions and re-releases as separate entities.

Releases scoring higher than 90/100 in 2017
Game	Developer	Publisher	Release Date	Platform	Average Score out of 100
The Legend of Zelda: Breath of the Wild	Nintendo EPD	Nintendo	March 3, 2017	NS	97
Super Mario Odyssey	Nintendo EPD	Nintendo	October 27, 2017	NS	97
The Legend of Zelda: Breath of the Wild	Nintendo EPD	Nintendo	March 3, 2017	WiiU	96
Divinity: Original Sin II	Larian Studios		September 14, 2017	WIN	93
Persona 5	P-Studio	Atlus	April 4, 2017	PS4	93
What Remains of Edith Finch	Giant Sparrow	Annapurna Interactive	July 19, 2017	XBO	92
Undertale	8-4		August 15, 2017	PS4	92
Ōkami HD	Capcom		December 12, 2017	WIN	92
Mario Kart 8 Deluxe	Nintendo EPD	Nintendo	April 28, 2017	NS	92
SteamWorld Heist: Ultimate Edition	Image & Form		December 28, 2017	NS	91
Shovel Knight: Treasure Trove	Yacht Club Games		March 3, 2017	NS	91
Retro City Rampage DX	Vblank Entertainment		August 3, 2017	NS	91
Bayonetta	PlatinumGames	Sega	April 11, 2017	WIN	90
Opus Magnum	Zachtronics		December 8, 2017	WIN	90
Pinball FX 3: Universal Classics Pinball	Zen Studios		September 26, 2017	XBO	90
Linelight	My Dog Zorro		January 30, 2017	WIN	90

=== Major awards ===
Category/Organization		35th Golden Joystick Awards November 17, 2017	The Game Awards 2017 December 7, 2017	21st Annual D.I.C.E. Awards February 22, 2018	18th Game Developers Choice Awards March 21, 2018	14th British Academy Games Awards April 12, 2018	
Game of the Year		The Legend of Zelda: Breath of the Wild				What Remains of Edith Finch	
Independent / Debut (Note: Certain award presentations combine these categories.)	Indie	Friday the 13th: The Game	Cuphead	Snipperclips	Cuphead	Gorogoa	
Independent / Debut	Debut	Friday the 13th: The Game	Cuphead	Snipperclips	Cuphead	Gorogoa	
Mobile/Handheld	Mobile	Pokémon Sun and Moon	Monument Valley 2	Fire Emblem Heroes	Gorogoa	Golf Clash	
Mobile/Handheld	Handheld	Pokémon Sun and Moon	Metroid: Samus Returns		Gorogoa	Golf Clash	
VR/AR		Resident Evil 7: Biohazard		Lone Echo	Superhot VR	—N/a	
Innovation		—N/a			Gorogoa	The Legend of Zelda: Breath of the Wild	
Artistic Achievement	Animation	Cuphead		Cuphead	Cuphead	Hellblade: Senua's Sacrifice	
Artistic Achievement	Art Direction	Cuphead		Cuphead	Cuphead	Hellblade: Senua's Sacrifice	
Audio	Music	The Legend of Zelda: Breath of the Wild	Nier: Automata	Cuphead	The Legend of Zelda: Breath of the Wild	Cuphead	
Audio	Sound Design	The Legend of Zelda: Breath of the Wild	Hellblade: Senua's Sacrifice	Super Mario Odyssey	The Legend of Zelda: Breath of the Wild	Hellblade: Senua's Sacrifice	
Character or Performance		Ashly Burch as Aloy; Horizon Zero Dawn	Melina Juergens as Senua; Hellblade: Senua's Sacrifice	Senua; Hellblade: Senua's Sacrifice	—N/a	Melina Juergens as Senua; Hellblade: Senua's Sacrifice	
Game Design or Direction	Game Design	—N/a	The Legend of Zelda: Breath of the Wild	The Legend of Zelda: Breath of the Wild	The Legend of Zelda: Breath of the Wild	Super Mario Odyssey	
Game Design or Direction	Game Direction	—N/a	The Legend of Zelda: Breath of the Wild	The Legend of Zelda: Breath of the Wild	The Legend of Zelda: Breath of the Wild	Super Mario Odyssey	
Narrative		Horizon Zero Dawn	What Remains of Edith Finch	Horizon Zero Dawn	What Remains of Edith Finch	Night in the Woods	
Technical Achievement		—N/a		Horizon Zero Dawn		—N/a	
Multiplayer/Online		PlayerUnknown's Battlegrounds			—N/a	Divinity: Original Sin II	
Action		—N/a	Wolfenstein II: The New Colossus	PlayerUnknown's Battlegrounds	—N/a		
Adventure		—N/a	The Legend of Zelda: Breath of the Wild		—N/a		
Family		—N/a	Super Mario Odyssey	Snipperclips	—N/a	Super Mario Odyssey	
Fighting		—N/a	Injustice 2		—N/a		
Role-Playing		—N/a	Persona 5	Nier: Automata	—N/a		
Sports/Racing	Sports	—N/a	Forza Motorsport 7	FIFA 18	—N/a		
Sports/Racing	Racing	—N/a	Forza Motorsport 7	Mario Kart 8 Deluxe	—N/a		
Strategy/Simulation		—N/a	Mario + Rabbids Kingdom Battle		—N/a		
Social Impact		—N/a	Hellblade: Senua's Sacrifice	—N/a		Hellblade: Senua's Sacrifice	
Special Award		Lifetime Achievement	Industry Icon Award	Lifetime Achievement	Lifetime Achievement Award	BAFTA Special	BAFTA Fellowship
Special Award		Sid Meier	Carol Shaw	Genyo Takeda	Tim Schafer	Nolan North	Tim Schafer

== Major events ==
Date	Event	Ref.
January 3–7	The 2017 Consumer Electronics Show was held in Las Vegas, Nevada.	
January 9	Video game writer Corey May leaves Certain Affinity to work for 2K Games.	
January 13	Nintendo's Nintendo Switch console reveal, detailing its release day, price, and technical specifications, was held at Tokyo Big Sight, and livestreamed online on Nintendo Direct.	
January 13	Sony Interactive Entertainment closes Guerrilla Cambridge.	
January 16	Hidetaka Suehiro announces that he has formed a new independent studio called White Owls.	
January 19	Ubisoft acquires FreeStyleGames from Activision. FreeStyleGames is renamed into Ubisoft Leamington.	
January 19	Video game designer Kim Swift is hired by Electronic Arts into their Motive Studios division.	
January 24	Avalanche Software, previously shuttered by Disney in May 2016, is acquired by Warner Bros. Interactive Entertainment and re-opened.	
January 31	Global production of the Wii U has officially ended.	
February 1	ZeniMax Media acquires Escalation Studios.	
February 1	Take-Two Interactive acquires Social Point.	
February 1	ZeniMax Media is awarded $500 million from Oculus VR over intellectual property and contract issues over the virtual reality technology used in the Oculus Rift.	
February 17	Writer Erik Wolpaw leaves Valve.	
February 21–23	Academy of Interactive Arts & Sciences hosted the 2017 D.I.C.E. Summit and 20th Annual D.I.C.E. Awards at the Mandalay Bay Convention Center in Las Vegas, Nevada. Todd Howard inducted into the AIAS Hall of Fame.	
February 23	Irrational Games is rebranded as Ghost Story Games.	
February 27	Peter Moore steps down as head of EA Sports to become CEO of the Liverpool Football Club.	
February 27–March 3	The 2017 Game Developers Conference held in San Francisco.	
March 15	Kevin Bruner steps down as CEO of Telltale Games, with Dan Conners replacing him.	
March 30	Club Penguin shutdown its servers after 12 years.	
March 31	Square Enix withdraws from IO Interactive.	
March 31	Nintendo closes the Nintendo DSi Shop on the DSi and DSi XL.	
April 3	Christophe Balestra steps down as co-president of Naughty Dog. Evan Wells remains in his role as sole president.	
April 27	The Kirby franchise celebrated its 25th anniversary in Japan.	
May 2	Chet Faliszek announced he has left Valve.	
May 10	Owlchemy Labs is acquired by Google.	
June 7	Jay Pinkerton announces he has left Valve.	
June 10–12	EA Play was held at the Hollywood Palladium.	
June 13–15	E3 2017 was held at the Los Angeles Convention Center.	
June 16	IO Interactive becomes an independent studio from Square Enix, retaining rights to the Hitman franchise.	
June 27	Arkane Studios founder Raphaël Colantonio leaves the company.	
June 30	Triumph Studios, the developer of the Age of Wonders series, is acquired by Paradox Interactive.	
July 18	Casey Hudson replaces Aaryn Flynn as the General Manager of BioWare.	
August 1	Electronic Arts confirmed that BioWare Montreal, the developer of Mass Effect: Andromeda, was absorbed into Motive Studios.	
August 8	Ubisoft announced the establishment of a new studio in Stockholm, Sweden.	
August 7–12	The International 2017, one of the highest paying eSports tournament in history, was held at the KeyArena in Seattle.	
August 22–26	Gamescom 2017 was held at Koelnmesse.	
September	People Can Fly opened a new studio in Newcastle, UK; their first outside of Poland.	
September 13	Bruce Straley, co-director of The Last of Us and Uncharted 4: A Thief's End departed from Naughty Dog after 18 years	
October 3	Andrew House, president and CEO of Sony Interactive Entertainment announced his departure from the company.	
October 12	Mike Laidlaw, the creator director of the Dragon Age franchise, left BioWare.	
October 13	IGN acquires Humble Bundle.	
October 17	Visceral Games, the developer of the Dead Space series, was shut down by owner Electronic Arts.	
November 3	Perfect World Entertainment shut down Runic Games and Motiga.	
November 9	Electronic Arts announced that they had acquired Respawn Entertainment, the creators of the Titanfall series.	
November 20	100 Thieves is founded.	
December 7	The Game Awards 2017 were held.	
December 14	Private Division, a new publishing subsidiary of Take-Two Interactive is formed.	
December 28	A swatting in Wichita, Kansas, caused by a dispute between two Call of Duty: WWII gamers over a $1.50 wager leads to a man unrelated to the dispute being shot and killed by police.	

== Notable deaths ==
- January 10 – Tony Rosato, 62, actor who voiced Luigi in The Adventures of Super Mario Bros. 3 and Super Mario World and provided additional voices for Resident Evil 3: Nemesis.
- January 19 – Miguel Ferrer, 61, actor who voiced Shan Yu in Mulan and its Disney's Animated Storybook adaptation, Covenant heretic leader Sesa Refume in Halo 2, and Death in Adventure Time: Explore the Dungeon Because I Don't Know!.
- January 22 – Masaya Nakamura, 91, businessman and founder of Namco.
- February 17 – Alan Stone, 71, co-founder of Nintendo of America
- June 2 – John, 96, English actor and voice actor best known for playing Norman Clegg in Last of the Summer Wine. He voiced Wallace in the Wallace & Gromit franchise and he also voiced Rat in Cosgrove Hall's The Wind in the Willows. He also voiced Wallace in several video games including Wallace & Gromit in Project Zoo and Wallace & Gromit: The Curse of the Were-Rabbit.
- June 9 – Adam West, 88, voice actor best known for the voice of Mayor Adam West in the Family Guy franchise.
- July 18 – Harvey Atkin, 74, actor who played King Koopa in The Super Mario Bros. Super Show!, The Adventures of Super Mario Bros. 3, and Super Mario World.
- July 26 – June Foray, 99, voice actress best known for the voice of villainess Magica De Spell in the original Ducktales series, as well as the 2013 video game DuckTales: Remastered, which is a remaster of the original 1989 video game.
- August 5 – Daniel Licht, 60, composer of the Dishonored series and Silent Hill
- November 7 – Roy Halladay, 40, baseball player who appeared in the MLB 2K titles and was the cover star of MLB 2K11.
- December 10 – Angry Grandpa, 67, YouTuber known for destroying video game consoles.

== Hardware releases ==
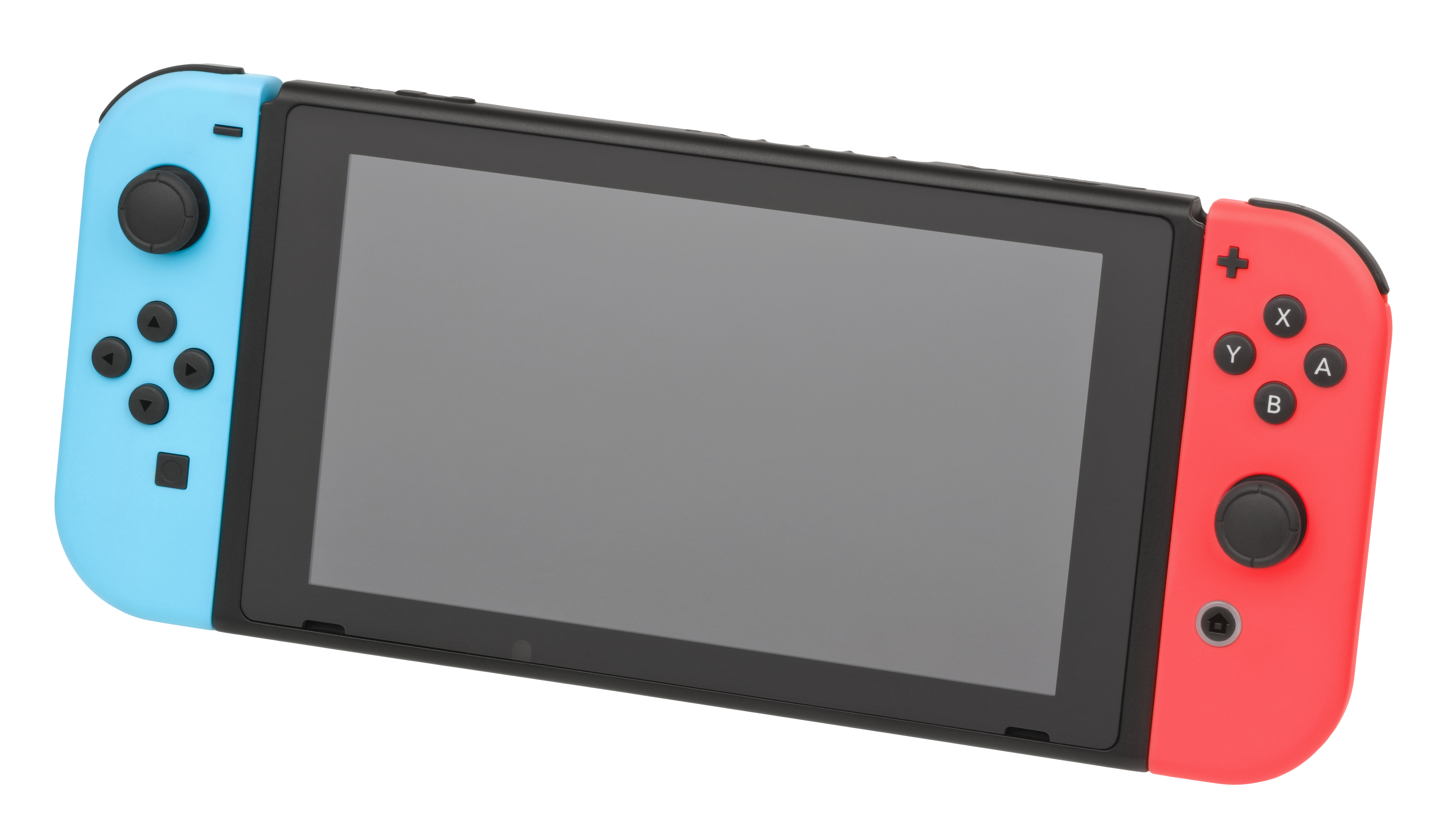
Nintendo Switch

The following is a list of game-related hardware released in 2017:

Nintendo released two systems this year; the Nintendo Switch, which helped save the company in the home console industry from the failure of the Wii U, and the New Nintendo 2DS XL, the final revision model of the Nintendo 3DS as well as the final entry in the Nintendo DS family overall.

Microsoft also released the Xbox One X, the second revision model of the Xbox One and the main competitor to Sony's PlayStation 4 Pro.

As of 2026, the Nintendo Switch is the 3rd best-selling video game console of all time, right behind the Nintendo DS (#2) and PlayStation 2 (#1).

Date	Console	Manufacturer	Ref.
January 10	New Shield Android TV	Nvidia	
March 3	Nintendo Switch^{WW}	Nintendo	
June 15	New Nintendo 2DS XL^{AU}	Nintendo	
July 13	New Nintendo 2DS XL^{JP/KOR}	Nintendo	
July 28	New Nintendo 2DS XL^{NA/EU}	Nintendo	
September 29	Super NES Classic Edition^{NA/EU}	Nintendo	
September 30	Super NES Classic Edition^{AUS}	Nintendo	
October 5	Super NES Classic Edition^{JP}	Nintendo	
November 7	Xbox One X^{WW}	Microsoft	

== Cancelled / delisted games ==
=== Cancelled ===
- Bloodstained: Ritual of the Night (WiiU)
- Scalebound (WIN, XBO)
- Titanfall: Frontline (iOS, DROID)

=== Delisted ===
- Club Penguin
- Firefall
- The Tomorrow Children
- Marvel Heroes

== Video game-based film and television releases ==
Title	Date	Type	Distributor	Franchise	Original game publisher(s)	Ref.
Akiba's Trip: The Animation	January 4, 2017	Anime television series	Funimation	Akiba's Trip	Acquire	
Granblue Fantasy: The Animation	April 1, 2017	Anime television series	Aniplex	Granblue Fantasy	Cygames	
Final Fantasy XIV: Dad of Light	April 17, 2017	Drama miniseries	Netflix	Final Fantasy	Square Enix	
The King's Avatar	April 19, 2017	Chinese animated series	YouTube	—N/a	—N/a	
Resident Evil: Vendetta	May 27, 2017	CGI animated film	Kadokawa	Resident Evil	Capcom	
Castlevania	July 7, 2017	Animated series	Netflix	Castlevania	Konami	
Candy Crush	July 9, 2017	Game show	CBS (United States)	Candy Crush Saga	King	
Parker Plays	July 15, 2017	Television series	Disney XD	—N/a	—N/a	
Player Select	July 15, 2017	Television series	Disney XD	—N/a	—N/a	
Pokémon the Movie: I Choose You!	July 15, 2017	Anime film	Toho (Japan)	Pokémon	Nintendo; The Pokémon Company	
Polaris Primetime	July 15, 2017	Television series	Disney XD	—N/a	—N/a	
The IGN Show	July 17, 2017	Television series	Disney XD/YouTube	—N/a	—N/a	
Play With Caution	July 17, 2017	Television series	Disney XD	—N/a	—N/a	
The Attack	July 31, 2017	Television series	Disney XD	—N/a	—N/a	
ESL Speedrunners	August 1, 2017	Television series	Disney XD	—N/a	—N/a	
Waypoint Presents	August 16, 2017	Television series	Disney XD	—N/a	—N/a	
Good Game	August 30, 2017	Television series	YouTube	Game Grumps	—N/a	
Overwatch Contenders	September 16, 2017	Television series	Disney XD	Overwatch	Blizzard Entertainment	
Jumanji: Welcome to the Jungle	December 20, 2017	Feature film	Sony Pictures Releasing	Jumanji	—N/a	

== See also ==
- 2017 in esports
- 2017 in games
