= The International 2019 =

2019 esports tournament

Tournament information
- Game: Dota 2
- Location: Shanghai, China
- Dates: August 20–25, 2019
- Administrator: Valve
- Tournament formats: Group stage; Round robin; Main event; Double elimination
- Venue: Mercedes-Benz Arena
- Participants: 18 teams
- Purse: US$34,330,068

Final positions
- Champions: OG
- 1st runner-up: Team Liquid
- 2nd runner-up: PSG.LGD

The International 2019 (TI9) was the ninth iteration of The International, an annual Dota 2 world championship esports tournament. Hosted by Valve, the game's developer, the tournament followed a year-long series of awarding qualifying points, known as the Dota Pro Circuit (DPC), with the top 12 ranking teams being directly invited to the tournament, which took place in August 2019 at the Mercedes-Benz Arena in Shanghai. In addition, six more teams earned invites through regional qualifiers played in July 2019. The grand finals took place between Team Liquid and OG, who had respectively won the International's 2017 and 2018 events. There, OG defeated Team Liquid 3–1 in the best-of-five series to become the first-ever repeat champion of an International.

As with every International from 2013 onwards, the prize pool was crowdfunded by the Dota 2 community via its battle pass feature, with the total at over US$34 million. In addition, various related activities were also held during the event, such as an all-star game and cosplay and submitted short film contests. The event had over a million concurrent viewers during the grand finals on the livestreaming platform Twitch.

== Background ==
Dota 2 is a 2013 multiplayer online battle arena (MOBA) video game developed by Valve. In it, two teams of five players compete by selecting characters known as "heroes", each team has a unique set of talents and powers, and cooperate together to be the first to destroy the base of the other team, which ends the match. The game is played from a top-down perspective, and the player sees a segment of the game's map near their character as well as mini-map that shows their allies, with any enemies revealed outside the fog of war. The game's map has three roughly symmetric "lanes" between each base, with a number of defensive towers protecting each side. Periodically, the team's base spawns a group of weak CPU-controlled creatures, called "creeps", that march down each of the three lanes towards the opponents' base, fighting any enemy hero, creep, or structure they encounter. If a hero character is killed, that character respawns back at their base after a delay period, which gets progressively longer the farther into the match.

As with previous years of the tournament, a corresponding battle pass for Dota 2 was released in May 2019, allowing the prize pool to be crowdfunded by players of the game. 25% of revenue made by it was sent directly towards the tournament's prize pool. In July 2019, the prize pool had reached over US$30 million. At the time of event, Dota 2 featured 117 playable characters, called "heroes". Prior to each game in the tournament, a draft is held between the opposing team captains to select which heroes their teams use, going back and forth until each side has banned six and selected five heroes. Once a hero is picked, it cannot be selected by any other player that match, so teams used the draft to strategically plan ahead and deny the opponents' heroes that may be good counters or would be able to take advantage of weaknesses to their current lineup.

== Format and teams ==
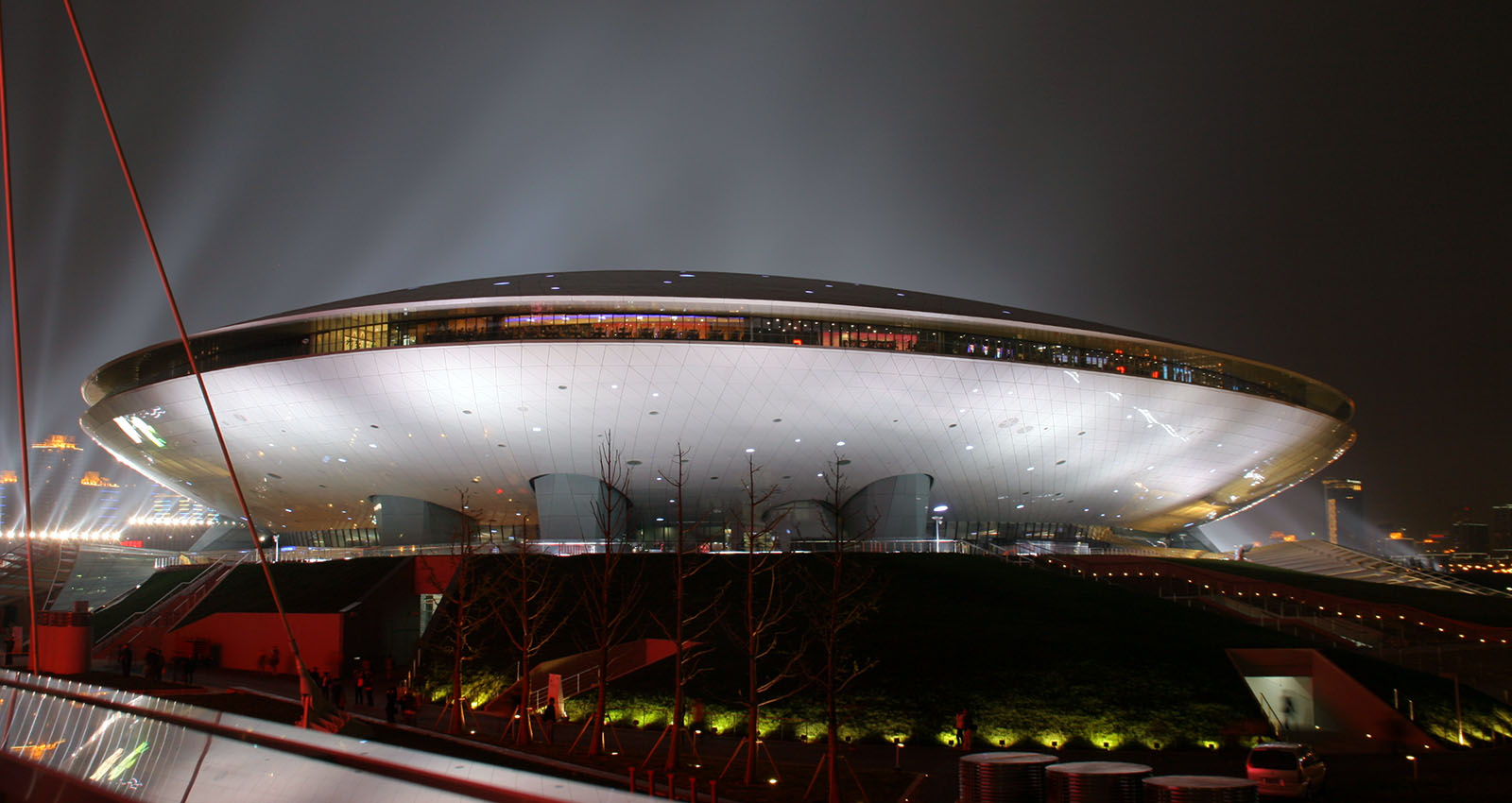
The main event was hosted at the Mercedes-Benz Arena in Shanghai

The International 2019 featured a series of pre-qualifying tournaments running from October 2018 until June 2019, known as the Dota Pro Circuit (DPC), with the top 12 ranking teams receiving direct invitations. In addition, six single-elimination qualifying playoff brackets were held in July 2019, with the winners from the regions of China, Commonwealth of Independent States (CIS), Europe, North America, South America, and Southeast Asia earning invites to the main event, bringing the total number of participating teams up to 18.

To seed the elimination bracket for the main event, round robin group stages featuring two groups of nine teams were played from August 15–18, 2019. In it, each of the teams played each other within their group in a two-game series. The top four placing teams of each group advanced to the upper bracket of the main event, while fifth through eighth advanced to the lower bracket. The lowest placed team from both groups were eliminated from the competition. The main event was held at the Mercedes-Benz Arena in Shanghai from August 20–25, making it the first International to take place in China. An all-star game, featuring the top 10 players based on their fantasy points during the group stage, was also played during the event.

Direct invitation (DPC)

- Team Secret
- Virtus.pro
- Vici Gaming
- Evil Geniuses
- Team Liquid
- PSG.LGD
- Fnatic
- Ninjas in Pyjamas
- TNC Predator
- OG
- Alliance
- Keen Gaming

Regional qualifier winners

- China: Royal Never Give Up
- CIS: Natus Vincere
- Europe: Chaos Esports Club
- North America: Newbee (Note: Qualified as Forward Gaming, but they ceased operations due to financial reasons a month prior to the tournament. The roster was then signed as free agents by the Chinese organization Newbee.)
- South America: Infamous
- Southeast Asia: Mineski

== Results ==
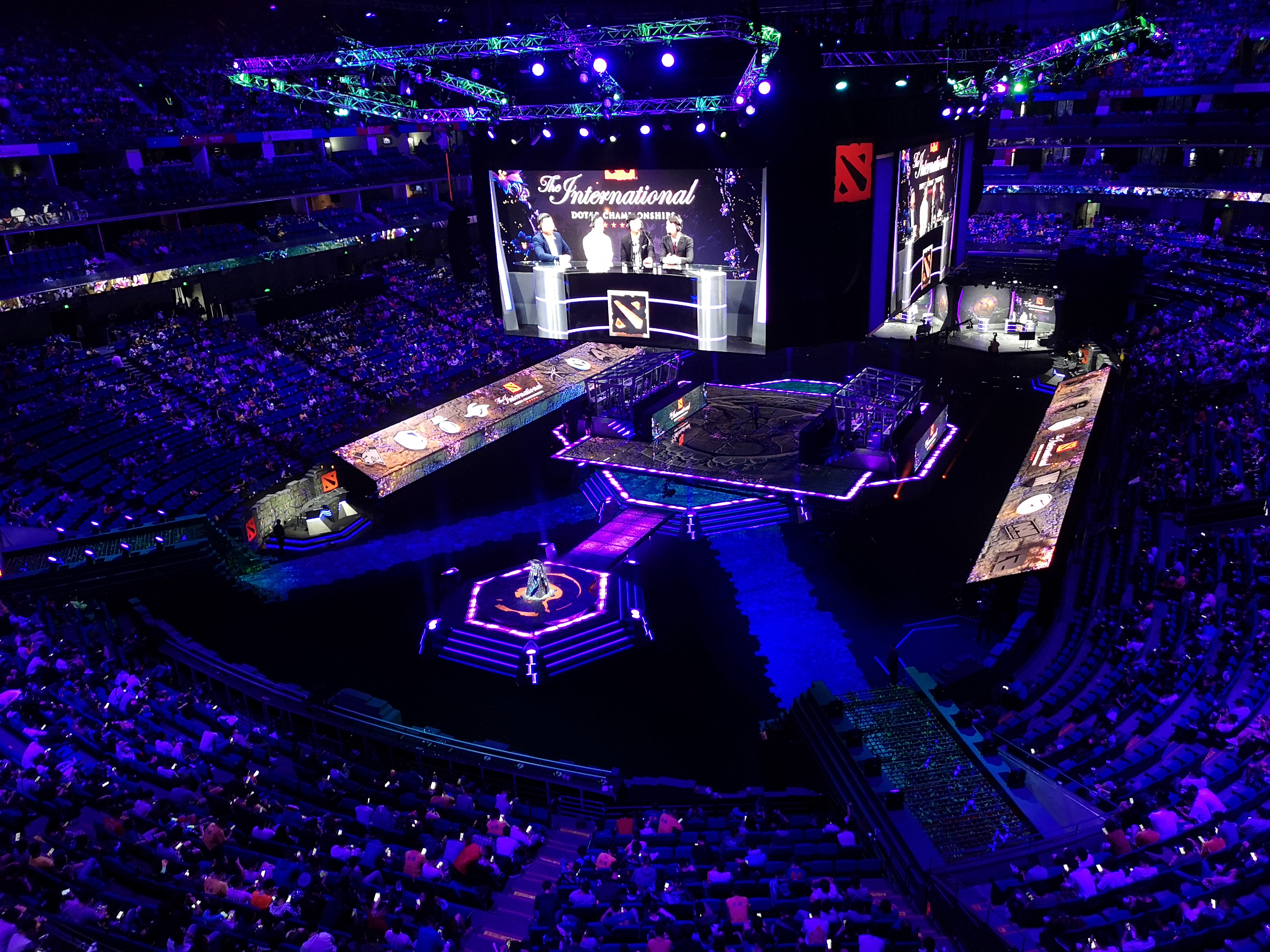
Inside the Mercedes-Benz Arena

=== Group stage ===
Group A
Pos	Team	W	L	
1	PSG.LGD	13	3	Advanced to the upper bracket
2	Team Secret	11	5	Advanced to the upper bracket
3	TNC Predator	9	7	Advanced to the upper bracket
4	Newbee	9	7	Advanced to the upper bracket
5	Alliance	8	8	Advanced to the lower bracket
6	Mineski	8	8	Advanced to the lower bracket
7	Team Liquid	6	10	Advanced to the lower bracket
8	Keen Gaming	5	11	Advanced to the lower bracket
9	Chaos Esports Club	3	13	Eliminated

Group B
Pos	Team	W	L	
1	OG	14	2	Advanced to the upper bracket
2	Vici Gaming	11	5	Advanced to the upper bracket
3	Evil Geniuses	9	7	Advanced to the upper bracket
4	Virtus.pro	8	8	Advanced to the upper bracket
5	Infamous	7	9	Advanced to the lower bracket
6	Fnatic	7	9	Advanced to the lower bracket
7	Natus Vincere	7	9	Advanced to the lower bracket
8	Royal Never Give Up	6	10	Advanced to the lower bracket
9	Ninjas in Pyjamas	3	13	Eliminated

=== Main event ===
==== Bracket ====
Upper round 1	Upper round 2	Upper final	Grand Finals
PSG.LGD	2
Virtus.pro	0
PSG.LGD	2
Vici Gaming	0
Vici Gaming	2
TNC Predator	1
PSG.LGD	1
OG	2
OG	2
Newbee	0
OG	2
Evil Geniuses	1
Team Secret	1
Evil Geniuses	2
OG	3
Team Liquid	1
Lower round 1	Lower round 2	Lower round 3	Lower round 4	Lower round 5	Lower final
Virtus.pro	0
Evil Geniuses	0
Alliance	0	Royal Never Give Up	2
Royal Never Give Up	0	Team Liquid	2
Royal Never Give Up	1
Team Liquid	2	PSG.LGD	1
TNC Predator	0
Team Liquid	2	Team Liquid	2
Fnatic	0	Team Liquid	2
Team Secret	0
Team Liquid	1
Newbee	1
Vici Gaming	0
Infamous	1	Infamous	2
Infamous	0	Team Secret	2
Keen Gaming	0
Team Secret	2
Team Secret	2
Mineski	1	Mineski	1
Natus Vincere	0

=== Winnings ===
Note: Prizes are in USD

Place	Team	Prize money
1st	OG	$15,620,181
2nd	Team Liquid	$4,462,909
3rd	PSG.LGD	$3,089,706
4th	Team Secret	$2,059,804
5th–6th	Evil Geniuses	$1,201,552
5th–6th	Vici Gaming	$1,201,552
7th–8th	Infamous	$858,252
7th–8th	Royal Never Give Up	$858,252
9th–12th	Mineski	$686,601
9th–12th	Newbee	$686,601
9th–12th	TNC Predator	$686,601
9th–12th	Virtus.pro	$686,601
13th–16th	Alliance	$514,951
13th–16th	Fnatic	$514,951
13th–16th	Keen Gaming	$514,951
13th–16th	Natus Vincere	$514,951
17th–18th	Chaos Esports Club	$85,825
17th–18th	Ninjas in Pyjamas	$85,825

== Legacy ==
The International 2019 set a crowdfunded esport prize pool record by eclipsing the previous years' record, finalizing at US$34,330,068. The tournament was the most watched Dota 2 event ever on the livestreaming platform Twitch, with a peak of over 1.1 million viewers during the grand finals. Other related events took place during the tournament, such as a cosplay and submitted short film contest with their own independent prize pools, as well as two new hero announcements for the game itself. An episode of True Sight, Valve's documentary film series on the professional Dota 2 scene, was filmed during the event. It followed OG and Team Liquid during the grand finals, documenting a number of behind the scenes moments for both teams before and after matches. It was released online for free on January 28, 2020, and also premiered to a live audience at the Kino Babylon in Berlin.

== Footnotes ==
Notes
