= ESL One Genting 2017 =

Esports championship tournament

Tournament information
- Sport: Dota 2
- Location: Genting Highlands, Pahang, Malaysia
- Dates: January 6–8, 2017
- Administrator: ESL
- Tournament format(s): Group stage Double elimination Main event Single elimination
- Host: ESL
- Venue: Arena of Stars
- Participants: 8 teams
- Purse: US$ 250,000

Final positions
- Champions: Digital Chaos
- Runner-up: Newbee

Tournament statistics
- Matches played: 13

ESL One Genting 2017 was a Dota 2 esports championship tournament hosted by ESL that took place in Genting Highlands, Malaysia, in January 2017. The tournament involved eight teams, which included three directly invited teams and five teams each represented qualifying regions of Americas, China, Europe, Malaysia and Southeast Asia. In the finals, Digital Chaos defeated Newbee 3–2 to win the tournament and their first major trophy. The 3rd place of the tournament went to The International 2016 champions Wings Gaming and Virtus.pro.

== Background ==
Dota 2 is a free-to-play multiplayer online battle arena video game (MOBA) developed by the Valve. In the game, two teams consist of five cooperating players are battling each other to destroy each other main base called "ancients". Players are controlling special units called "heroes", each having unique abilities and playstyle. The team who manages to destroy the opponent's team ancient first win the game. The game is played from a top-down perspective where players see a segment of the game's map with mini-map showing allies and revealed enemies outside the fog of war, and the player-controlled hero's health and abilities status. The game's map has three symmetric paths called "lanes" connect the two bases with automated defense turrets positioned in each side. Periodically, each base will spawn a group of weak non-playable units called "creeps" automatically march through each lanes to attack every hostile units or building they encounter. If a hero is killed mid-game, the hero will automatically respawn back at their base after a delay period which length gets progressively longer the farther into the match.

== Teams ==
The tournament involved 3 directly invited teams and 5 regional qualifier winners. The regional qualifiers took place in five qualifying regions: Americas, China, Europe, Malaysia and Southeast Asia (excluding Malaysia), from October 21 to November 21, 2016. Each qualifier used single-elimination format and consisted of two phases, the open qualifier and main qualifier. The open qualifier used best-of-one format and will have four teams qualified to the main qualifier. The main qualifier consisted of 12 teams, where eight teams are directly invited and four qualified teams from the open qualifier. All matches in the main qualifier except the grand finals used best-of-three format, while the grand finals used best-of-five format. The invited teams of the tournament are the Malaysian-based team Fnatic and The International 2016 champions and runners-up Wings Gaming and Digital Chaos.

Team	Qualified as
Digital Chaos	Direct invitee
Fnatic	Direct invitee
Wings Gaming	Direct invitee
Team NP	Americas regional qualifier winner
Newbee	Chinese regional qualifier winner
Virtus.pro	European regional qualifier winner
WarriorsGaming.Unity	Malaysian regional qualifier winner
Execration	Southeast Asian regional qualifier winner

== Venue ==
The main event of the tournament took place at Arena of Stars, a musical amphitheater with capacity around 6,000 seats, located at Genting Highlands, one of the most popular tourist resort in Malaysia. ESL chose to host the tournament in Malaysia due to the massive popularity of Dota 2 in Southeast Asia.

== Format ==
The group matches used double elimination format, while the playoffs used single elimination format. 8 participating teams were divided between 2 groups of four. The first two matches of each group used the best-of-one format, while the rest of the tournament used the best-of-three format, with the exception of the grand finals, which used the best-of-five format. The losers of the first two matches of each group move to the lower bracket and face each other, while the winners will face each other to take the first playoff seed. The second playoff seed is determined byGenting Highland Malaysia (16) a match between the lower bracket winner and the upper bracket loser.

== Results ==
=== Group stage ===
Group A

First Round
Virtus.pro	1
Fnatic	0
Winner's bracket
Newbee	1
Team NP	0
Fnatic	0
Team NP	2
Loser's bracket

Second Round
Virtus.pro	1
Newbee	2
Virtus.pro	2
Team NP	1

Group B

First Round
Digital Chaos	1
Execration	0
Winner's bracket
Wings Gaming	1
WG.Unity	0
Execration	2
WG.Unity	1
Loser's bracket

Second Round
Digital Chaos	2
Wings Gaming	1
Wings Gaming	2
Execration	0

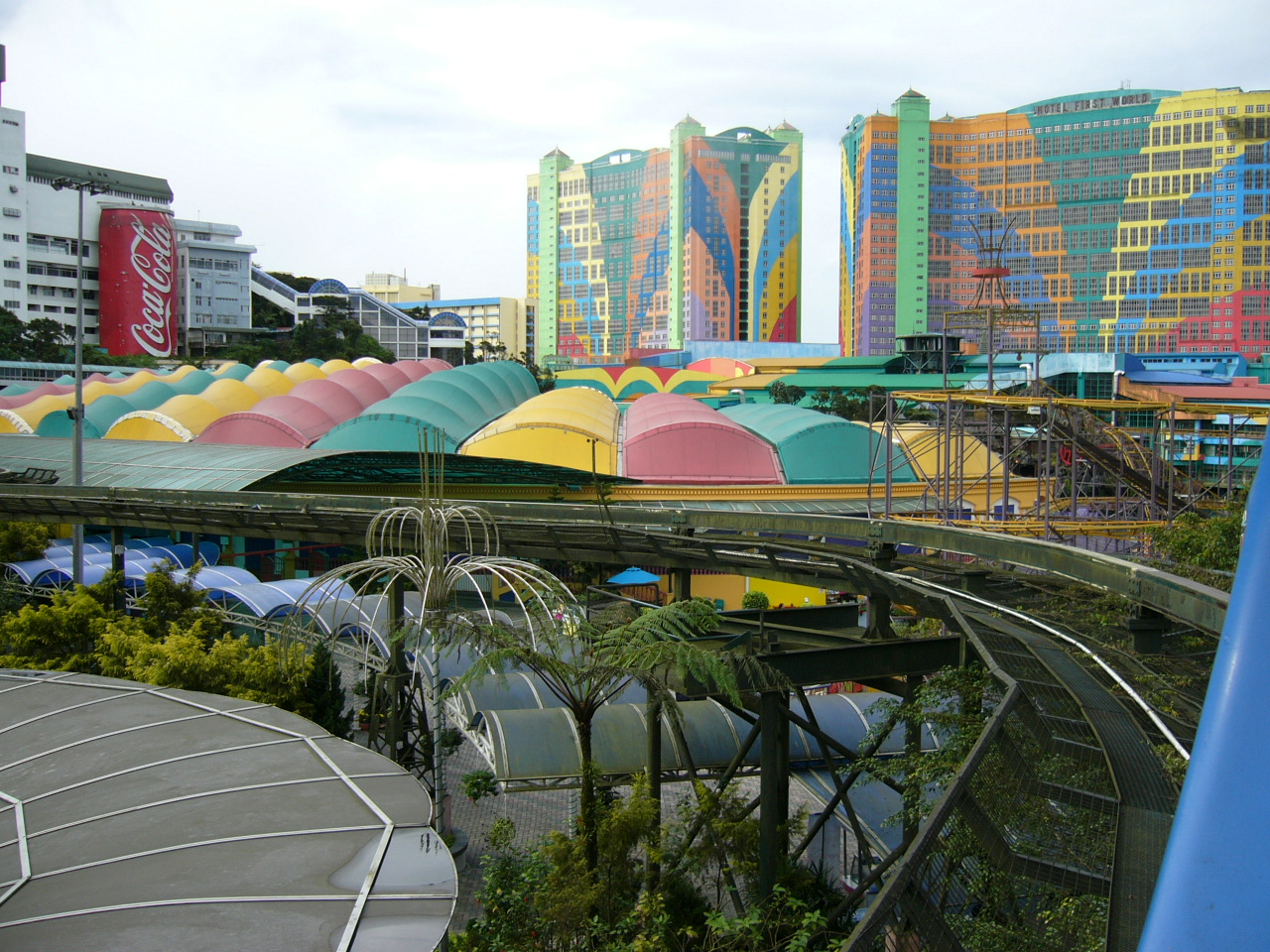
Outside view of Arena of Stars in Genting Highlands, Malaysia, the venue of the tournament

=== Playoffs ===
Semi-finals
January 8, 2017
Newbee	2
Wings Gaming	1
January 8, 2017
Digital Chaos	2
Virtus.pro	0

Grand finals
January 8, 2017
Newbee	2
Digital Chaos	3

=== Grand finals ===
January 8, 2017; 19:01 MST	Report	Newbee	2–3	Digital Chaos	Arena of Stars, Genting Highlands
Score by game:
Newbee won game 1	32–9
26–28	Digital Chaos won game 2
Newbee won game 3	19–5
7–17	Digital Chaos won game 4
11–31	Digital Chaos won game 5
–

After defeated Newbee 2–3 in the grand finals, Digital Chaos became champions of the tournament. This was the first major trophy win for Digital Chaos, after their best result as runners-up at The International 2016. as champions they received US$125,000 prize money.

== Winnings ==
ESL confirmed the tournament has a prize pool of US$250,000. US$125,000 went to the champions while the runners-up received US$50,000.

Place	Team	Prize money
1st	Digital Chaos	US$125,000
2nd	Newbee	US$50,000
3rd	Wings Gaming	US$22,500
3rd	Virtus.pro	US$22,500
5th	Team NP	US$10,000
5th	Execration	US$10,000
7th	Fnatic	US$5,000
7th	WarriorsGaming.Unity	US$5,000

== Media ==
The tournament was broadcast via Dota 2's built-in spectating client, as well as via ESL official live streams on ESL TV and ESL Twitch channel. It is estimated 11.4 million people watched the tournament online.
