= List of Show Lo concerts =

Show Lo concert tours
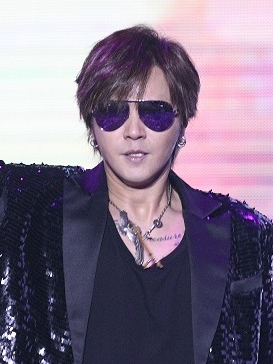
- Lo performing in 2022
- Concert tours: 6
- One-off concerts: 8

This is a list of concert tours by Taiwanese recording artist Show Lo. He has embarked on six concert tours, with the first being the Show on Stage World Tour in 2007.

== Show on Stage World Tour ==
List of concert dates
Date	City	Country	Venue
June 9, 2007	Shanghai	China	Shanghai Grand Stage
June 30, 2007	Nanjing	China	Olympic Sports Center
November 17, 2007	Taipei	Taiwan	Taipei Arena
November 18, 2007	Taipei	Taiwan	Taipei Arena
December 1, 2007	Singapore		Singapore Indoor Stadium
December 18, 2007	Wuxi	China	Wuxi New Sports Stadium
February 23, 2008	Hong Kong		Pop TV Arena
February 24, 2008	Hong Kong		Pop TV Arena
December 27, 2008	Guangzhou	China	Tianhe Sports Centre Stadium
May 2, 2009	Macau		Venetian Arena
November 26, 2009	Connecticut	United States	Mohegan Sun Arena
April 24, 2010	Tokyo	Japan	Shibuya-AX

== Dance Without Limits World Tour ==
List of concert dates
Date	City	Country	Venue
April 30, 2010	Hong Kong		Hong Kong Coliseum
May 1, 2010	Hong Kong		Hong Kong Coliseum
May 2, 2010	Hong Kong		Hong Kong Coliseum
May 15, 2010	Taipei	Taiwan	Taipei Arena
May 16, 2010	Taipei	Taiwan	Taipei Arena
May 22, 2010	Singapore		Singapore Indoor Stadium
June 26, 2010	Wuhan	China	Hankou Cultural Sports Centre
August 7, 2010	Shanghai	China	Hongkou Stadium
August 28, 2010	Chengdu	China	Chengdu Sports Centre Stadium
October 30, 2010	Macau		Venetian Arena
November 5, 2010	Hangzhou	China	Yellow Dragon Sports Centre Stadium
November 13, 2010	Beijing	China	Beijing Wukesong Culture & Sports Center
March 5, 2011	Guangzhou	China	Tianhe Sports Centre Stadium
March 19, 2011	Taichung	Taiwan	National Taiwan University
April 1, 2011	Sydney	Australia	Acer Arena
April 15, 2011	Melbourne	Australia	Melbourne Convention and Exhibition Centre
April 16, 2011	Kuala Lumpur	Malaysia	Putra Indoor Stadium
May 7, 2011	Macau		Venetian Arena
May 14, 2011	Singapore		Singapore Indoor Stadium
May 21, 2011	Shanghai	China	Mercedes-Benz Arena
July 10, 2011	Hong Kong		Hong Kong Coliseum
July 11, 2011	Hong Kong		Hong Kong Coliseum
July 12, 2011	Hong Kong		Hong Kong Coliseum
August 13, 2011	Kaohsiung	Taiwan	Kaohsiung Arena
September 5, 2011	Atlantic City	United States	Borgata Hotel Casino
September 10, 2011	Indio	United States	Fantasy Springs Resort Casino
September 11, 2011	San Jose	United States	Event Center Arena
October 8, 2011	Quanzhou	China	Straits Sports Centre Stadium

== Over the Limit World Tour ==
List of concert dates
Date	City	Country	Venue
January 4, 2013	Taipei	Taiwan	Taipei Arena
January 5, 2013	Taipei	Taiwan	Taipei Arena
January 6, 2013	Taipei	Taiwan	Taipei Arena
January 18, 2013	Hong Kong		Hong Kong Coliseum
January 19, 2013	Hong Kong		Hong Kong Coliseum
January 20, 2013	Hong Kong		Hong Kong Coliseum
January 21, 2013	Hong Kong		Hong Kong Coliseum
March 1, 2013	Singapore		Singapore Indoor Stadium
April 13, 2013	Shanghai	China	Mercedes-Benz Arena
April 20, 2013	Guangzhou	China	Guangzhou Gymnasium
May 3, 2013	Genting Highlands	Malaysia	Arena of Stars
May 4, 2013	Genting Highlands	Malaysia	Arena of Stars
May 11, 2013	Beijing	China	Beijing Wukesong Culture & Sports Center
May 25, 2013	Chengdu	China	Sichuan Provincial Sports Centre
June 1, 2013	Xiamen	China	Xiamen Convention and Exhibition Center
June 22, 2013	Nanning	China	Guangxi Sports Center
June 29, 2013	Tianjin	China	Tianjin Sports Center
August 24, 2013	Shenzhen	China	Shenzhen Bay Sports Center
August 30, 2013	Sydney	Australia	Sydney Entertainment Centre
September 1, 2013	Melbourne	Australia	Melbourne Convention and Exhibition Centre
September 7, 2013	Xi'an	China	Xi'an Sports Centre
October 5, 2013	Macau		Venetian Arena
October 26, 2013	Toronto	Canada	Hershey Centre
October 29, 2013	Vancouver	Canada	Rogers Arena
January 25, 2014	Kaohsiung	Taiwan	Kaohsiung Arena
May 3, 2014	Singapore		Singapore Indoor Stadium
May 10, 2014	Shanghai	China	Mercedes-Benz Arena
June 14, 2014	Beijing	China	Beijing Wukesong Culture & Sports Center
September 13, 2014	Hong Kong		Hong Kong Coliseum
September 14, 2014	Hong Kong		Hong Kong Coliseum
November 26, 2014	Uncasville	United States	Mohegan Sun Arena
November 27, 2014	Uncasville	United States	Mohegan Sun Arena
November 29, 2014	Las Vegas	United States	The Colosseum at Caesars Palace
December 13, 2014	Macau		Venetian Arena
March 28, 2015	Genting Highlands	Malaysia	Arena of Stars

== Crazy World Tour ==
List of concert dates
Date	City	Country	Venue	Attendance
April 23, 2016	Shanghai	China	Mercedes-Benz Arena	—
May 1, 2016	Fuzhou	China	Fuzhou Olympic Sports Centre Stadium	—
May 14, 2016	Guangzhou	China	Guangzhou International Sports Arena	—
May 28, 2016	Beijing	China	Beijing Wukesong Culture & Sports Center	—
June 18, 2016	Shijiazhuang	China	Hebei Stadium	—
July 29, 2016	Taipei	Taiwan	Taipei Arena	—
July 30, 2016	Taipei	Taiwan	Taipei Arena	—
July 31, 2016	Taipei	Taiwan	Taipei Arena	—
August 20, 2016	Shenzhen	China	Shenzhen Bay Sports Center	—
September 11, 2016	Shenyang	China	Liaoning Stadium	—
October 8, 2016	Macau		Venetian Arena	—
October 15, 2016	Chongqing	China	Chongqing International Centre	—
October 29, 2016	Nanjing	China	Nanjing Olympic Sports Centre	—
November 13, 2016	Zhengzhou	China	Zhengzhou International Centre	—
December 25, 2016	Hong Kong		AsiaWorld–Expo	—
December 26, 2016	Hong Kong		AsiaWorld–Expo	—
January 14, 2017	Xi'an	China	Qujiang International Centre	—
March 11, 2017	Genting Highlands	Malaysia	Arena of Stars	—
April 2, 2017	Hefei	China	Binhu Convention and Exhibition Centre	—
May 6, 2017	Nanchang	China	Nanchang Sports Centre	—
July 29, 2017	Guangzhou	China	Guangzhou Gymnasium	—
August 12, 2017	Singapore	China	Resorts World Sentosa	—
November 22, 2017	Uncasville	United States	Mohegan Sun Arena	20,000
November 23, 2017	Uncasville	United States	Mohegan Sun Arena	20,000
December 3, 2017	Wuhan	China	Wuhan Sports Center	—
January 12, 2018	Foshan	China	Lingnan Pearl Sports Center	—
January 28, 2018	Dongguan	China	Bank of Dongguan Basketball Center	—
April 28, 2018	Shenzhen	China	Shenzhen Bay Sports Center	—
May 26, 2018	Xiamen	China	Xiamen Jimei Tan Kah Kee Sports Center	—
June 2, 2018	Beijing	China	Cadillac Center	—

== Show Lo Evolution World Tour ==
List of concert dates
Date	City	Country	Venue	Attendance
July 9, 2022	Taipei	Taiwan	Taipei Arena	10,000
November 12, 2022	Kaohsiung	Taiwan	Kaohsiung Arena	—
November 26, 2022	Atlantic City	United States	Etess Arena	—
March 18, 2023	Genting Highlands	Malaysia	Arena of Stars	—
July 29, 2023	Taipei	Taiwan	Taipei Arena	—
July 30, 2023	Taipei	Taiwan	Taipei Arena	—
August 28, 2023	Paris	France	Salle Pleyel	—
August 30, 2023	London	England	Troxy	—
September 8, 2023	Melbourne	Australia	Festival Hall	—
September 10, 2023	Sydney	Australia	Darling Harbour Theatre	—
October 7, 2023	Singapore		Singapore Indoor Stadium	10,000
October 10, 2023	Toronto	Canada	Meridian Hall	—
October 17, 2023	Vancouver	Canada	The Orpheum	—
December 31, 2023	Kaohsiung	Taiwan	Kaohsiung Arena	—
January 7, 2024	Hong Kong		AsiaWorld–Expo	—
September 14, 2024	Kuala Lumpur	Malaysia	Mega Star Arena	—

== Show Lo 30th Anniversary World Tour ==
List of concert dates
Date	City	Country	Venue
December 28, 2024	Kaohsiung	Taiwan	Kaohsiung Arena
December 31, 2024	Kaohsiung	Taiwan	Kaohsiung Arena
February 14, 2025	Tokyo	Japan	Tokyo Garden Theater
May 31, 2025	Macau		Galaxy Arena
August 16, 2025	Singapore		Resorts World Sentosa Convention Centre
January 10, 2026	Genting Highlands	Malaysia	Arena of stars
June 13, 2026	Hong Kong		Hong Kong Coliseum
