= List of Lay Zhang concert tours =

Lay Zhang concert tours
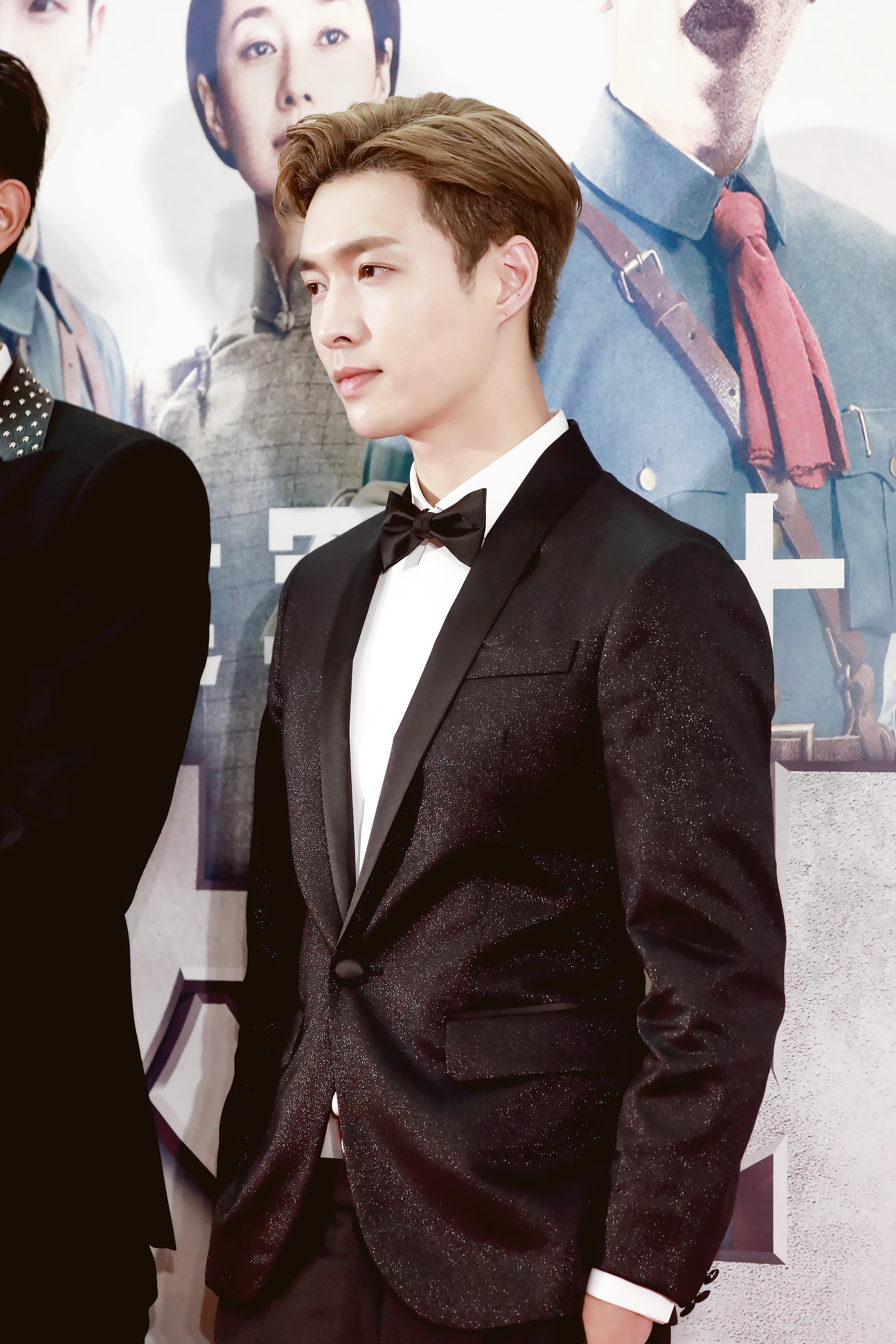
- Zhang in 2017
- Concert tours: 5
- Fan meetings: 7

This is a list of concerts and tours by Chinese singer Lay Zhang.

== 2019 Grand Line: The First Concert 大航海 ==
Zhang embarked on his first international concert tour, Grand Line, in July 2019. Tickets for the concert at the Mercedes-Benz Arena in Shanghai sold out in eight seconds, while tickets for the Nanjing show sold out in twenty-five seconds.

| Date | City | Country | Venue |
|---|---|---|---|
| July 6, 2019 | Shanghai | China | Mercedes-Benz Arena |
| July 14, 2019 | Chongqing | China | Huaxi Culture and Sports Center |
| July 20, 2019 | Nanjing | China | Nanjing Olympic Sports Center |
| August 3, 2019 | Beijing | China | Cadillac Arena |
| August 25, 2019 | Bangkok | Thailand | Impact Exhibition and Convention Center |
| December 14, 2019 | Shenzhen | China | Shenzhen Universiade Sports Centre |
| December 15, 2019 | Shenzhen | China | Shenzhen Universiade Sports Centre |

== 2022 Grand Line: Infinite Lands 未至之境 ==
| Date | City | Country | Venue |
|---|---|---|---|
| October 15, 2022 | Kuala Lumpur | Malaysia | Arena of Stars |
| October 19, 2022 | Singapore | | Resorts World Convention Center |
| October 22, 2022 | Bangkok | Thailand | Royal Paragon Hall |
| November 20, 2022 | San Francisco | United States | The Warfield |
| Augusts 5, 2023 | Shenzhen | China | Shenzhen Universiade Center Gymnasium |

== 2023 Grand Line: Boundless 无远弗届 ==
| Date | City | Country | Venue |
|---|---|---|---|
| August 12, 2023 | Beijing | China | Cadillac Arena |
| August 13, 2023 | Beijing | China | Cadillac Arena |
| October 6, 2023 | Shanghai | China | Mercedes-Benz Arena |
| October 7, 2023 | Shanghai | China | Mercedes-Benz Arena |
| October 28, 2023 | Dalian | China | Dalian Sports Center Gymnasium |
| November 4, 2023 | Nanjing | China | Nanjing Youth Olympic Sports Park Gymnasium |
| November 11, 2023 | Guangzhou | China | Baoneng Performing Arts Center |
| November 18, 2023 | Chengdu | China | Phoenix Mountain Sports Center Gymnasium |
| December 2, 2023 | Chongqing | China | Huaxi Culture and Sports Center |

== 2024 Grand Line: Step 舞步 ==
| Date | City | Country | Venue |
|---|---|---|---|
| June 15, 2024 | Nanjing | China | Nanjing Youth Olympic Sports Park Gymnasium |
| June 16, 2024 | Nanjing | China | Nanjing Youth Olympic Sports Park Gymnasium |
| June 22, 2024 | Seoul | South Korea | SK Olympic Handball Gymnasium |
| June 23, 2024 | Seoul | South Korea | SK Olympic Handball Gymnasium |
| July 06, 2024 | Chengdu | China | Phoenix Hill Sports Park Gymnasium |
| July 10, 2024 | Kuala Lumpur | Malaysia | Arena of Stars |
| July 13, 2024 | Yokohama | Japan | Pacifico Yokohama |
| July 27, 2024 | Xi'an | China | Xi'an Olympic Sports Center Gymnasium |
| August 2, 2024 | Guangzhou | China | Baoneng Performing Arts Center |
| August 3, 2024 | Guangzhou | China | Baoneng Performing Arts Center |

== 2025 Grand Line: Rock the Heavenly Palace 闹天宫 ==
| Date | City | Country | Venue | Attendance |
|---|---|---|---|---|
| August 2, 2025 | Beijing | China | Wukesong Arena | — |
| August 3, 2025 | Beijing | China | Wukesong Arena | — |
| August 8, 2025 | Chengdu | China | Phoenix Hill Sports Park Gymnasium | — |
| August 9, 2025 | Chengdu | China | Phoenix Hill Sports Park Gymnasium | — |
| August 16, 2025 | Haikou | China | Wuyuanhe Stadium | — |
| August 30, 2025 | Shenzhen | China | Shenzhen Universiade Stadium | — |
| August 31, 2025 | Shenzhen | China | Shenzhen Universiade Stadium | — |
| September 6, 2025 | Nanjing | China | Nanjing Youth Olympic Sports Park | 17,000 |
| September 13, 2025 | Shanghai | China | Mercedes‑Benz Arena | 32,000 |
| September 14, 2025 | Shanghai | China | Mercedes‑Benz Arena | 32,000 |
| September 26, 2025 | Ningbo | China | Ningbo Olympic Sports Center | — |
| September 27, 2025 | Ningbo | China | Ningbo Olympic Sports Center | — |
| October 6, 2025 | Beijing | China | Beijing National Stadium | 120,000 |
| October 7, 2025 | Beijing | China | Beijing National Stadium | 120,000 |
| Total | | | | — |
