= Intel Extreme Masters Season XII – Oakland =

Intel Extreme Masters
Tournament information
- Sport: Counter-Strike: Global Offensive; PlayerUnknown's Battlegrounds
- Location: Burbank, California, United States; Oakland, California, United States
- Dates: November 18–19, 2017
- Administrator: ESL
- Tournament format(s): CS:GO; Group stage: Round robin Playoffs: Single elimination PUBG; 8-matches Battle royal
- Host: ESL
- Venue: Oracle Arena

Intel Extreme Masters Season XII – Oakland (IEM Oakland 2017 for short) was an esports event in Oakland, United States in November 2017. It was hosted by ESL as a part of Intel Extreme Masters Season 12. The event consist of two First-person shooter tournaments, Counter-Strike: Global Offensive and PlayerUnknown's Battlegrounds, and involved many invited and qualified teams from different regions of the world.

== Venue ==
The main event of the tournament took take place at the Oracle Arena in Oakland, California, United States. It is a multipurpose arena known as the home tenant of NBA team Golden State Warriors, with total capacity around 20,000. It is the second time for Oracle Arena to host the event, after it previously hosted the IEM Oakland 2016.

== Counter-Strike: Global Offensive ==
=== Participating teams ===
==== Direct invitees ====
- Astralis
- Cloud9
- FaZe Clan
- G2 Esports
- Gambit Esports
- Ninjas in Pyjamas
- Renegades
- SK Gaming
- Team Liquid

==== Regional qualifier winners ====
- OpTic Gaming (North America)
- Team EnVyUs (Europe)
- The MongolZ (East and Southeast Asia)

=== Format ===
The group matches were held in Intel Esports Arena in Burbank, California between November 15–16, 2017 and used round robin format, while the playoffs in Oakland used single elimination format with 2 allocated byes for each group winners in the quarterfinals. 12 participating teams were divided between 2 groups of six. All group matches are played with best-of-one format, while playoffs and grand finals are best-of-three and best-of-five respectively. Group standings are determined by points and rounds won-lost difference. A win in normal time resulted 3 points, while a win in overtime resulted in 2 points, also a loss in overtime resulted in 1 point. Each group winners went straight to semifinals, while first and second group runners-up faced each other in quarterfinals.

=== Results ===
==== Group stage ====
===== Group A =====
Pos	Team	M	W	L	RW	RL	RD	Pts
1	Ninjas in Pyjamas	5	4	1	77	47	+30	12
2	Cloud9	5	3	2	60	54	+6	9
3	SK Gaming	5	3	2	82	80	+2	9
4	Astralis	5	3	2	74	70	+4	8
5	Team EnVyUs	5	2	3	74	74	0	7
6	The MongolZ	5	0	5	38	80	-42	0

===== Group B =====
Pos	Team	M	W	L	RW	RL	RD	Pts
1	FaZe Clan	5	4	1	67	51	+16	12
2	OpTic Gaming	5	3	2	57	63	-6	9
3	Gambit Esports	5	2	3	74	69	+5	9
4	Renegades	5	2	3	71	66	+5	7
5	G2 Esports	5	2	3	65	76	-11	5
6	Team Liquid	5	2	3	62	81	-19	4

==== Playoffs ====
Quarterfinals
SK Gaming	2
OpTic Gaming	0
Gambit Esports	1
Cloud9	2

Semifinals
Ninjas in Pyjamas	2
SK Gaming	1
FaZe Clan	2
Cloud9	0

Grand finals
Ninjas in Pyjamas	3
FaZe Clan	2

==== Grand finals ====
November 19, 2017; 4:20 PM PDT	Report	Ninjas in Pyjamas	3–2	FaZe Clan	Oracle Arena, Oakland; Attendance: 15,000
Score by game:
Ninjas in Pyjamas won game 1	16–10
7–16	FaZe Clan won game 2
Ninjas in Pyjamas won game 3	16–10
6–16	FaZe Clan won game 4
Ninjas in Pyjamas won game 5	16–10
–

=== Winnings ===
The total prize money for the tournament was confirmed by ESL as US$300,000. The champions and runners-up were rewarded US$125,000 and US$50,000, respectively. In addition to the base prize pool, teams were awarded US$1,000 per group stage victory.

Place	Team	Base prize money	Group stage money	Total prize money
1st	Ninjas in Pyjamas	US$125,000	US$4,000	US$129,000
2nd	FaZe Clan	US$50,000	US$4,000	US$54,000
3rd	SK Gaming	US$25,000	US$3,000	US$28,000
3rd	Cloud9	US$25,000	US$3,000	US$28,000
5th	OpTic Gaming	US$12,000	US$3,000	US$15,000
5th	Gambit Esports	US$12,000	US$2,000	US$14,000
7th	Astralis	US$5,000	US$3,000	US$8,000
7th	Renegades	US$5,000	US$2,000	US$7,000
9th	Team EnVyUs	US$3,500	US$2,000	US$5,500
9th	G2 Esports	US$3,500	US$2,000	US$5,500
11th	Team Liquid	US$2,000	US$2,000	US$4,000
11th	The MongolZ	US$2,000	US$0	US$2,000

== PlayerUnknown's Battlegrounds ==
=== Participating teams ===
==== Direct invitees ====
- Alliance
- Cloud9
- Evil Geniuses
- FaZe Clan
- Luminosity Gaming
- Method
- Ninjas in Pyjamas
- Noble
- Penta Sports
- Team SoloMid
- Team Liquid
- Tempo Storm

==== Regional qualifier winners ====
- *aAa* Gaming (Europe)
- Corn Shuckers (North America)
- Crimson Esports (Europe)
- Digital Chaos (Europe)
- Ghost Gaming (North America)
- Miami Flamingos (North America)
- Ronin Esports (North America)
- Wind and Rain (Europe)

=== Format ===
The tournament used the battle royal format where all 20 teams, each consist of 4 players, were simultaneously battling and eliminating each other in 8 matches across both days of the event. Teams were awarded points based on both finishing points and accrued kills within each match. The winning team were decided by cumulative points received after all matches had been played.

=== Results ===
French team *aAa* Gaming won the tournament with the highest cumulative points at the end of the 8th match. Second and third place went to two American teams Tempo Storm and Ghost Gaming, respectively.

==== Final standings ====
Pos	1	2	3	4	5	6	7	8
Team	*aAa* Gaming	Tempo Storm	Ghost Gaming	FaZe Clan	Digital Chaos	Team SoloMid	Method	Cloud9
Pts	1620	1385	1375	1355	1300	1285	1195	1195
K	38	28	31	39	35	31	38	31
Prize	US$200,000	US$60,000	US$45,000	US$20,000	US$15,000	US$12,000	US$10,000	US$8,000
