= Infamous Gaming =

South American esports organization

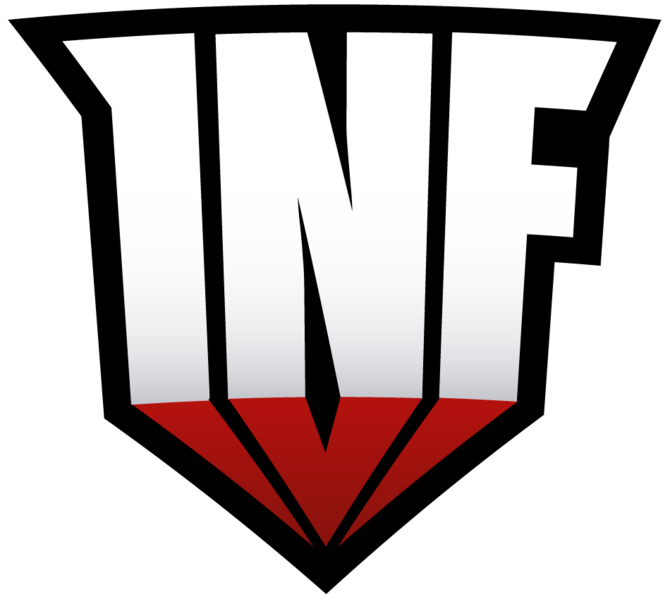
- Divisions: Dota 2; Clash Royale (former); Hearthstone (former)
- Founded: December 2015
- Based in: Lima, Peru
- Location: South America
- Website: infamous.gg

Infamous Gaming is a South American professional esports organization based in Lima, Peru, founded in 2015. Infamous' Dota 2 team is known for being one of the few South American teams to compete in major international events. The team first gained attention by winning the 2016 World Electronic Sports Games Americas Finals and placing fourth in the inaugural tournament, Infamous became the first South American team to qualify for The International, the game's premier tournament, in 2017. In 2019, the team again participated in The International, this time placing 7/8th in the tournament.

== History ==
Infamous Gaming was founded in December 2015, with an initial roster composed primarily by former members of Team Unknown, who, founded earlier in 2015, were the first South American team to participate in a Valve event, the Frankfurt Major.

Initially, Infamous competed in a number of Minor and Qualifier tier tournaments throughout the first half of 2016 but made its first breakthrough by finishing first in the WESG Americas Finals. Their position qualified them for entry in the WESG tournament in Changzhou, China. After winning their first two matches, the team lost 1–2 to Cloud9 in the semifinals and again 1–2 to Alliance to place fourth.

Infamous was invited to participate and placed first in the South American regional qualifiers for The International 2017 earning a place in the championship tournament in Seattle. The team was defeated by OG in the first group round to place 13th-16th.

Infamous competed in several tournaments in 2018, including placing fourth in the GESC Indonesia Minor, an international pro-circuit tournament where earned points would help qualify for participation in The International 2018. However, it was reported that the team failed to register its roster the previous month, forcing them to participate in the open qualifiers, in which the team was eliminated after placing 4-5th.

During EPICENTER Major 2019, Infamous Gaming only had one player from South American region. Black^, one of the players, have commented that this practice is overall positive to the development of weaker regions.

Infamous again placed first in the South American regional qualifiers for The International 2019 in Shanghai. After being placed in the lower-bracket following the round-robin, Infamous won their first two matches 1–0 against Keen Gaming and 2–1 against Newbee. In the third round of the lower bracket the team was defeated by 0-2 Team Secret placing 7-8th.

== Rosters ==
=== Infamous ===
ID	Name	Nationality
Parker	David Nicho Chote	Peru
Kxy	Eliseo Arancibia	Peru
Papita	Mariano A. Caneda	Argentina
Michael-	Miguel Choque	Bolivia
Accel	Cristian Cruz	Peru
Stakky	Stacey Bruhn	Australia
