= Titanfall: Frontline =

- Developer(s): Particle City
- Publisher(s): Nexon
- Series: Titanfall
- Platform(s): Android, iOS
- Release: Cancelled
- Genre(s): Card battle
- Mode(s): Multiplayer

Titanfall: Frontline is a cancelled free-to-play card battle video game developed by American studio Particle City for Android and iOS devices, as part of the Titanfall franchise.

== Gameplay ==
Players are situated on both ends of the screen, with a playfield in the middle. A Titan in the center faces the player's opponent.

Unlike other prominent collectible card games in the genre, which are played in turns, Titanfall: Frontline is played in real-time. The player collects and places Pilot, Titan, and burn cards to damage and defeat their opponent. Pilot and Titan cards can combine to perform extra damage.

The game is free-to-play, and players can choose to purchase in-game content.

== Development ==
In October 2015, Respawn Entertainment, creators of the Titanfall franchise, began a long-term partnership with Nexon, a company known for its free-to-play online games. The partnership was set to include Respawn sister studio and mobile game developer Particle City, which was co-founded by Respawn's Vince Zampella. Respawn owns a significant portion of Particle City, and Nexon invested in both Los Angeles-based companies as part of the deal. Several new franchise games are planned in the partnership, but none were expected to replicate the original's first-person shooter on a mobile device. Particle City led development on the title, and Nexon served as its publisher. It soft launched on Android in mid-September 2016 and on iOS in the Philippines later that month. Titanfall: Frontline was planned for a full release in 2016 on Android and iOS devices but was cancelled on January 13, 2017.
