= DreamHack Winter 2017 =

Esports tournament in Jönköping, Sweden

Tournament information
- Sport: Counter-Strike: Global Offensive; Dota 2 H1Z1; Hearthstone; Quake Champions; Super Smash Bros. Melee
- Location: Jönköping, Jönköping County, Sweden
- Dates: December 1–4 2017
- Administrator: DreamHack
- Venue(s): Elmia Fair

DreamHack Winter 2017 was an eSports and gaming convention event that was held in Jönköping, Sweden from December 1–4, 2017. The event hosted several eSports tournaments of multiple disciplines, such as Counter-Strike: Global Offensive (DreamHack ASTRO Open 2017), Dota 2, (DreamLeague Season 8), H1Z1 (H1Z1 Elite Series), Hearthstone (DreamHack Hearthstone Grand Prix), Quake Champions (Quake Champions Invitational), and Super Smash Bros. Melee (DreamHack Smash Championship).
