= The International 2017 =

2017 esports tournament

Tournament information
- Game: Dota 2
- Location: Seattle, Washington, U.S.
- Dates: August 7–12, 2017
- Administrator: Valve
- Tournament formats: Group stage; Round robin; Main event; Double elimination
- Venue: KeyArena
- Participants: 18 teams
- Purse: US$24,787,916

Final positions
- Champions: Team Liquid
- 1st runner-up: Newbee
- 2nd runner-up: LGD.Forever Young

The International 2017 (TI7) was the seventh iteration of The International, an annual Dota 2 esports world championship tournament. Hosted by Valve, the game's developer, the tournament began with the online qualifier phase in June 2017, and ended after the main event at the KeyArena in Seattle in August. The Grand Finals took place between the European-based Team Liquid and Chinese-based Newbee, with Liquid defeating Newbee 3–0 in a best-of-five series, winning nearly $11 million in prize money.

As with every International from 2013 onwards, the prize pool was crowdfunded by the Dota 2 community via its battle pass feature, with the total being one of the largest in esports history at nearly US$25 million. Other relevant events took place during the tournament, including a cosplay competition and submitted short film contest with their own independent prize pools. In addition, the first demonstration game of what later became the OpenAI Five, bots trained to defeat high-skill players of the game entirely through machine learning, was played live during the event.

== Overview ==
=== Background ===
Dota 2 is a multiplayer online battle arena (MOBA) video game developed by Valve, which released in 2013. In it, two teams of five players compete by selecting pre-designed in-game hero characters, each with a variety of innate skills and deploy-able powers, and cooperating together to destroy the base of the other team before their own base is destroyed as to win the round. The game is played from a top-down perspective, and the player sees a segment of the game's map near their character as well as mini-map that shows their allies, with any enemies revealed outside the fog of war. The game's map has three symmetric "lanes" between each base, with a number of automated defense towers protecting each side. Periodically, the team's base will spawn an army of weak non-playable "creeps" that will march down one lane towards the opponents' base, fighting any enemy hero, creep, or structure they encounter. If a hero character is killed, that character will respawn back at their base after a delay period, which gets progressively longer the farther into the match.

As with previous years of the tournament, a corresponding battle pass for Dota 2 was released in May 2017, allowing the prize pool to be crowdfunded by players of the game. Known as the "Compendium", 25% of revenue made by it was sent directly towards the tournament's prize pool. At the time of event, Dota 2 featured 113 playable characters, called "heroes". Prior to each game in the tournament, a pre-game draft was held between the opposing team captains to select which heroes their teams will use, going back and forth until each side has selected and banned five heroes. Once a hero is picked, it cannot be selected by any other player that match, so teams use the draft to strategically plan ahead and deny the opponent's heroes that may be good counters or would be able to take advantage of weaknesses to their current lineup. The first pick in a match is decided by an in-game coin toss, and switches between each game in that match; the team that does not get first pick does get the option of which side of the map to defend.

=== Format ===
The tournament initially began with the Commonwealth of Independent States (CIS), China, Europe, North America, South America, and Southeast Asia online regional qualifiers in June 2017. Following that, two separate best-of-two round robin groups consisting of nine teams each were played from August 2–5, with lowest placed team from both being eliminated from the competition. The remaining 16 teams moved on to the double elimination main event at the KeyArena in Seattle from August 7–12, with the top four finishing teams from both groups advancing to the upper bracket, and the bottom four advancing to the lower bracket. The first round of the lower bracket was treated as single-elimination, with the loser of each match being immediately eliminated from the tournament. Every other round of both brackets was played in a best-of-three series, with the exception being the Grand Finals, which was played between the winners of the upper and lower brackets in a best-of-five series.

Six teams were invited directly to the event, with an additional twelve qualifying teams participating. New to the event from previous years was the expansion from 16 to 18 total teams, as well as establishment of new qualifying regions; the Americas were split into separate North and South America regions, and the Commonwealth of Independent States (CIS) region was split off from Europe. The International 2016 champion Wings Gaming disbanded earlier in 2017 with its members taking a break from professional Dota, marking the first time in the International's history that a defending champion or any player of its former roster did not defend their title. The rosters of two independent teams, Planet Dog and Team NP, were signed after the qualifier stage respectively by the esports organizations HellRaisers and Cloud9. Valve tournament rules allow for players to freely play for another organization without restrictions, as long as the rosters remain the same.

As with previous years of the event, Seattle KCPQ reporter Kaci Aitchison reprised her role as co-host and interviewer. However, Paul "ReDeYe" Chaloner, the desk host of the last two Internationals, was not invited. Instead, Counter-Strike: Global Offensive tournament host Alex "Machine" Richardson and StarCraft personality Sean "Day[9]" Plott replaced him.

Direct invitation

- (United States) Evil Geniuses
- (China) Invictus Gaming
- (China) Newbee
- (Europe) OG
- (Europe) Team Liquid
- (Russia) Virtus.pro

Regional qualifier winners

- iG Vitality (China)
- LGD.Forever Young (China runner-up)
- LGD Gaming (China third place)
- (Russia) Team Empire (CIS)
- Team Secret (Europe)
- HellRaisers (Europe runner-up) (Note: Played through the qualifiers as Planet Dog)
- (United States) Cloud9 (North America) (Note: Played through the qualifiers as Team NP)
- (United States) Digital Chaos (North America runner-up)
- (Peru) Infamous (South America)
- (Philippines) TNC Pro Team (Southeast Asia)
- (Malaysia) Fnatic (Southeast Asia runner-up)
- (Philippines) Execration (Southeast Asia third place)

== Results ==
=== Group stage ===
The group stage events were round robin matches played before the main event that, based on results, either placed teams into the upper or lower bracket. The lowest placed team from both groups were eliminated from the competition.

Group A
| Pos | Team | W | L | |
|---|---|---|---|---|
| 1 | Team Liquid | 13 | 3 | Advanced to the upper bracket |
| 2 | LGD Gaming | 12 | 4 | Advanced to the upper bracket |
| 3 | Evil Geniuses | 11 | 5 | Advanced to the upper bracket |
| 4 | TNC Pro Team | 9 | 7 | Advanced to the upper bracket |
| 5 | Team Secret | 7 | 9 | Advanced to the lower bracket |
| 6 | iG.Vitality | 7 | 9 | Advanced to the lower bracket |
| 7 | Team Empire | 6 | 10 | Advanced to the lower bracket |
| 8 | Infamous | 5 | 11 | Advanced to the lower bracket |
| 9 | Fnatic | 2 | 14 | Eliminated |

Group B
| Pos | Team | W | L | |
|---|---|---|---|---|
| 1 | LGD.Forever Young | 14 | 2 | Advanced to the upper bracket |
| 2 | Newbee | 11 | 5 | Advanced to the upper bracket |
| 3 | Invictus Gaming | 10 | 6 | Advanced to the upper bracket |
| 4 | Virtus.pro | 10 | 6 | Advanced to the upper bracket |
| 5 | OG | 9 | 7 | Advanced to the lower bracket |
| 6 | Cloud9 | 6 | 10 | Advanced to the lower bracket |
| 7 | Digital Chaos | 6 | 10 | Advanced to the lower bracket |
| 8 | Execration | 5 | 11 | Advanced to the lower bracket |
| 9 | HellRaisers | 1 | 15 | Eliminated |

=== Main event ===
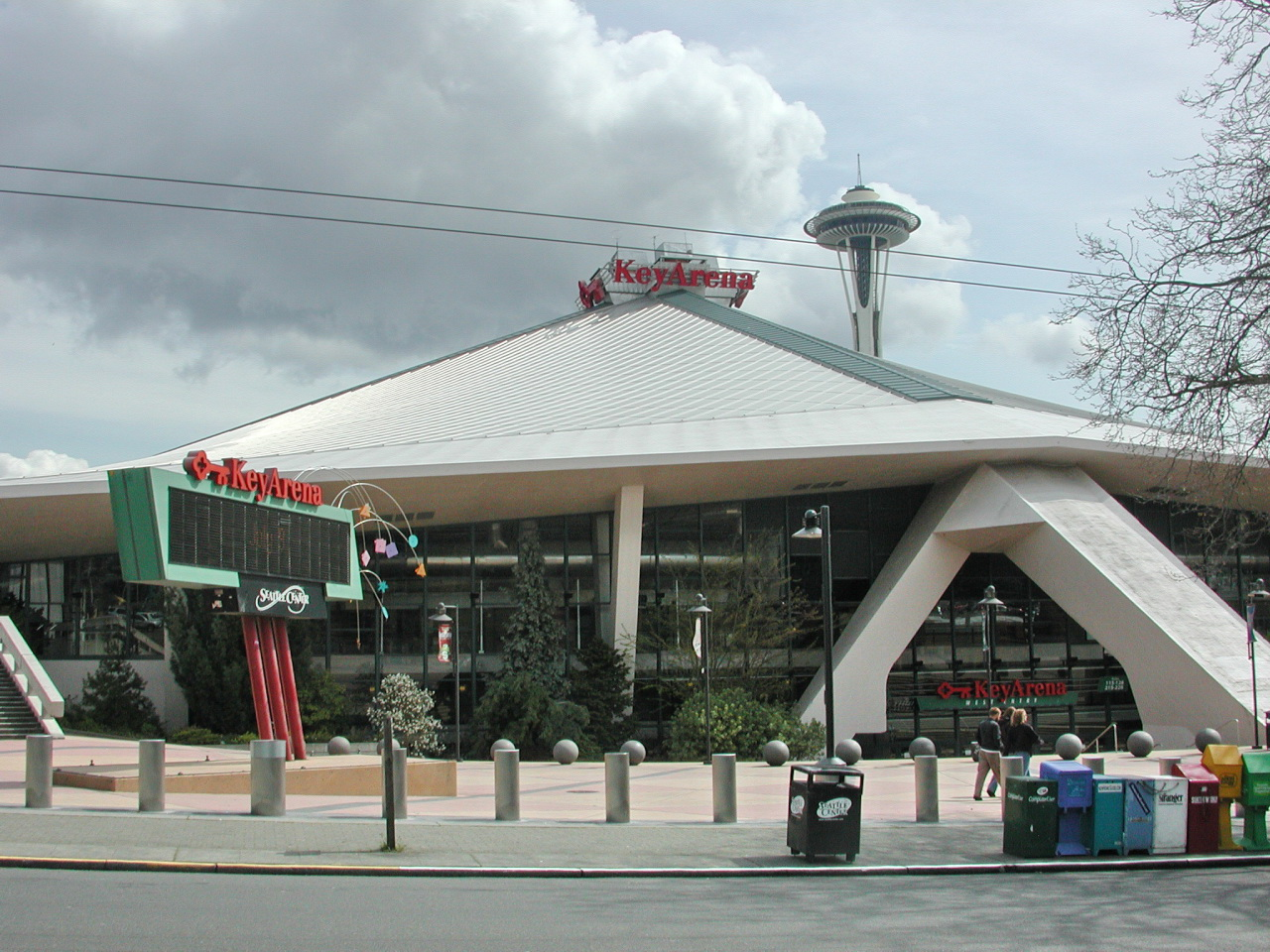
KeyArena in Seattle, the venue where the main event took place

The main event featured two brackets in a double-elimination tournament format. In the upper brackets, played to best-of-three, the winning team moved on, while the losing team would then be placed in respective rounds of the lower bracket. The winner of the upper bracket moved to the Grand Finals. The first round in the lower bracket was played as a best-of-one, with the loser being immediately eliminated. All other matches were best-of-three, with the winner of the lower bracket advancing to the Grand Finals, which was a best-of-five series, to face the winner of the upper bracket.

The grand finals took place between Team Liquid, who advanced from the lower bracket, and Newbee, who advanced from the upper bracket, with Liquid defeating Newbee 3–0 in a best-of-five series. After losing the first two games in similar fashion, Newbee then attempted to adjust their drafting strategy at the start of third and series-deciding match in a desperate attempt to save the series. However, it was in vain as Liquid had early game success and swiftly advanced towards Newbee's base, overwhelming them and winning the series and therefore the tournament, making Team Liquid the first team to have shut out the opposing team in an International grand finals.

==== Bracket ====
Upper round 1 | Upper round 2 | Upper final | Grand Finals
Team Liquid | 1
Invictus Gaming | 2
Invictus Gaming | 1
Newbee | 2
Evil Geniuses | 0
Newbee | 2
Newbee | 2
LGD.Forever Young | 1
LGD.Forever Young | 2
TNC Pro Team | 0
LGD.Forever Young | 2
Virtus.pro | 0
LGD Gaming | 0
Virtus.pro | 2
Newbee | 0
Team Liquid | 3
Lower round 1 | Lower round 2 | Lower round 3 | Lower round 4 | Lower round 5 | Lower final
Team Liquid | 2
Virtus.pro | 1
Team Secret | 1 | Team Secret | 1
Team Liquid | 2 | Team Liquid | 2
Execration | 0
Team Empire | 0 | LGD.Forever Young | 1
Evil Geniuses | 0
Team Liquid | 2 | Team Liquid | 2
Cloud9 | 0 | Team Empire | 2
LGD Gaming | 0
Team Empire | 1
TNC Pro Team | 0
Invictus Gaming | 0
OG | 1 | OG | 2
OG | 0 | LGD Gaming | 2
Infamous | 0
LGD Gaming | 2
LGD Gaming | 2
iG.Vitality | 0 | Digital Chaos | 0
Digital Chaos | 1

=== Winnings ===
(Note: Prizes are in USD)

| Place | Team | Prize money |
|---|---|---|
| 1st | Team Liquid | $10,862,683 |
| 2nd | Newbee | $3,950,067 |
| 3rd | LGD.Forever Young | $2,592,231 |
| 4th | LGD Gaming | $1,728,154 |
| 5th/6th | Invictus Gaming | $1,110,956 |
| 5th/6th | Virtus.pro | $1,110,956 |
| 7th/8th | OG | $617,198 |
| 7th/8th | Team Empire | $617,198 |
| 9th–12th | Digital Chaos | $370,319 |
| 9th–12th | Evil Geniuses | $370,319 |
| 9th–12th | Team Secret | $370,319 |
| 9th–12th | TNC Pro Team | $370,319 |
| 13th–16th | Cloud9 | $123,440 |
| 13th–16th | Execration | $123,440 |
| 13th–16th | iG Vitality | $123,440 |
| 13th–16th | Infamous | $123,440 |
| 17th–18th | Fnatic | $61,720 |
| 17th–18th | HellRaisers | $61,720 |

== Legacy ==
Until being surpassed by The International 2018, the event held the esports tournament record for the largest prize pool, which finalized at US$24,787,916. A four-part episodic documentary television series produced by TBS regarding the event aired throughout August 2017. Known as Eleague: Road To The International Dota 2 Championships, the documentary followed compLexity Gaming's attempt to qualify for the tournament. Other events took place during the tournament, including an all-star match, featuring players voted in by battle pass owners, a fan cosplay competition, and a Dota 2 themed short film contest, with all of them having their own independent prize pools. Also during the event, Valve revealed a teaser trailer for Artifact, a Valve-developed digital collectible card game based on Dota 2, as well as two new playable characters for the game itself. A live 1v1 demonstration was also played during the event between professional Dota 2 player Dendi and an OpenAI-curated machine learned bot, to which Dendi lost. The grand finals of the tournament between Team Liquid and Newbee were featured in an episode of Valve's Dota documentary series, True Sight.

The matches were broadcast through the game's built-in spectating client, as well as through the live streaming platform Twitch. Valve reported that concurrent viewership numbers exceeded five million during the event, surpassing numbers set at previous Internationals. During the Grand Finals, more than 400,000 people were watching the series via Twitch, with the KeyArena also being filled to its 15,000+ capacity.
