= Arena of Stars =

Musical amphitheater in Pahang, Malaysia

Coordinates: 3.42257°N 101.794022°E

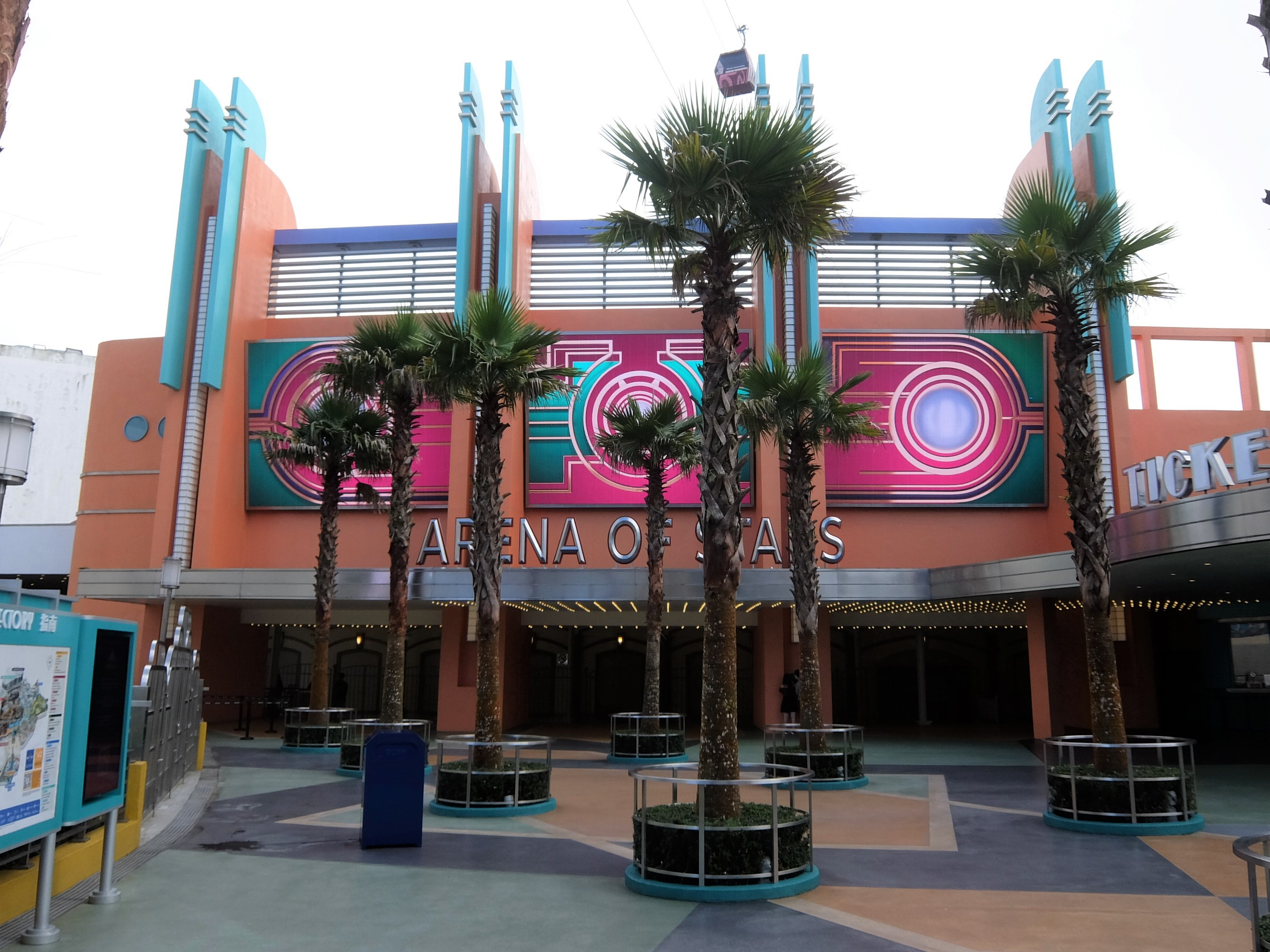
Arena of Stars in Genting Highlands

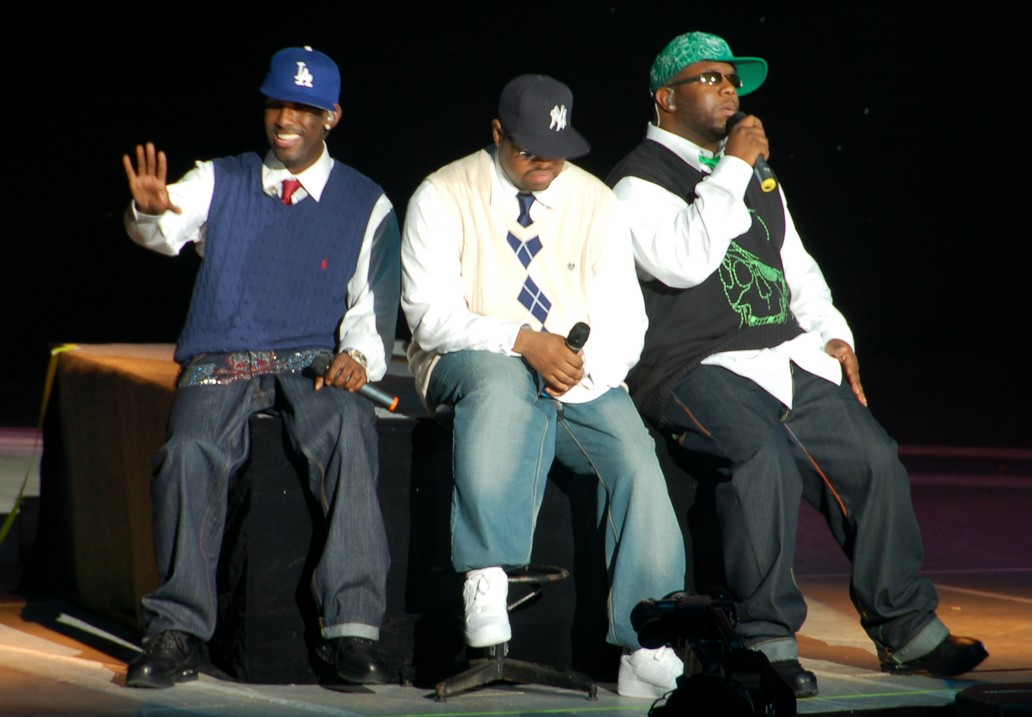
Boyz II Men concert in Arena of Stars

Arena of Stars is a 45,000 square feet (4,200 m^{2}) musical amphitheater in Genting Highlands, Pahang, Malaysia, built in 1998. The hall has a capacity of about 5,132 seats. It is also known for its famous national and international lion dance and dragon dance competitions.

== History ==
During its initial development, the amphitheater was built without a roof. However, due to the severe weather of Genting Highlands it was later decided that a roof was required. The first show at the amphitheater in January 1998 featured Sally Yeh and George Lam. The 2007 Zee Cine Award show was held at the amphitheater, necessitating an upgrade to the venue's make-up rooms.

In 2002, the amphitheater hosted the 3rd IIFA Awards, which honors artistic and technical excellence of professionals in Bollywood.

== Technical parameters ==
All of the events in Arena of Stars are managed by the Promotions and Entertainment Department of Resorts World Genting.

The amphitheater's sound system was upgraded in July 2011 at a cost of US$3 million, including new speakers for the entire amphitheater. Seating in the amphitheater is divided into five categories according to cost, with white as the most expensive followed by red, green, yellow and blue.

== See also ==
- List of concert hall in Malaysia
