= Chaos Esports Club =

American esports organization

- Short name: Chaos E.C.
- Sports: Counter-Strike: Global Offensive; Fortnite Battle Royale; Rocket League; Tom Clancy's Rainbow Six Siege; Dota 2; Apex Legends
- Founded: 2015
- Folded: 2021
- Location: United States
- CEO: Greg Laird
- Website: chaos.ec

Chaos Esports Club is an American esports organization. Originally founded as Digital Chaos in 2015, the organization is best known for their Dota 2 team's Cinderella run at The International 2016 tournament, where they finished as the runner-up.

In April 2017, the organization announced the departure of founding member and owner Shannon "SUNSfan" Scotten. The following year, they expanded into other games, such as PlayerUnknown's Battlegrounds, Tom Clancy's Rainbow Six Siege, and Counter-Strike: Global Offensive. Around the same time, the organization rebranded itself from Digital Chaos to Chaos Esports Club.

== Tom Clancy's Rainbow Six Siege ==
On March 6, 2018, Digital Chaos signed a team for tactical first-person shooter Tom Clancy's Rainbow Six Siege by signing organization-less European team, The Swedes. The original roster consisted of Christoffer "Kripps" Brushane, Rasmus "REDGROOVE" Larsson, Mattias Johannes "Renuilz" Nordebäck, Rickard "Secretly" Olofsson, and Lars Malte "sno0ken" Ekström.

The team performed badly in Pro League Season 10 and Kripps left and later retired towards the end of the season. On November 1, Chaos signed Pro League and World champion, Ville "SHA77E" Palola, after GiFu was relegated to Challenger League.
