= StarCraft II in esports =

- Highest governing body: Blizzard Entertainment
- First played: 2010

Characteristics
- Type: Video game, eSports
- Equipment: Computer, mouse, keyboard, headphones

Professional StarCraft II competition features professional gamers competing in Blizzard Entertainment's real-time strategy game StarCraft II. Professional play began following the game's initial release in 2010, as the game was the sequel to StarCraft, considered one of the first esports and the foundation of South Korea's interest and success in competitive gaming. Between 2016 and 2019, competition was centered around the Global StarCraft II League in Korea and the World Championship Series Circuit everywhere else, with all Blizzard-sanctioned events being under the StarCraft II World Championship Series (WCS) banner. Since 2020, Blizzard changed the format of WCS by entering into a three-year partnership with esports organizers ESL and DreamHack.

== History ==
=== Pre-release expectations ===
Prior to StarCraft II's release, StarCraft: Brood War had been called the most successful esport, featuring its own ranking system, and it had been referred to as the national pastime in South Korea, where there were two television channels dedicated to broadcasting professional StarCraft matches. The series' history with professional competition had brought about the creation of the Korean e-Sports Association (KeSPA) and the professional team league it administered, StarCraft Proleague. As such, the original was considered the founding esport of the country's successful infrastructure and scene. This led to high expectations for the sequel's success as an esport, but also a conflict between KeSPA and Blizzard Entertainment, sparking a three-year long legal battle between them. This meant KeSPA would not be transitioning to StarCraft II upon its release.

The first large StarCraft II tournaments occurred during the beta testing phase in the months prior to release, the most notable being the HDH Invitational and esports player Sean "Day[9]" Plott's King of the Beta. The success of both viewership and sponsorship of these early events cemented high expectations for professional play of the title going into its July 2010 release.

=== Early success ===
Following its launch, StarCraft II quickly turned into a successful esport, becoming the main feature of many leagues and circuits of ongoing tournaments with some of the largest prize pools in professional gaming. Among these, the first large professional events for the game were organized by Major League Gaming and Intel Extreme Masters in the months following the game's release, with IEM Season V - Global Challenge Cologne and 2010 MLG Pro Circuit Raleigh. Soon after, the game's first professional league was formed in Korea, the Global StarCraft II League (GSL) organized by GOMTV. The game also became a primary fixture of Dreamhack starting with a November showing in 2010 and Assembly that same year. The title's early popularity led to the creation of multiple StarCraft II-only competitions outside of Korea as well, with the return of StarCraft mainstay TeamLiquid's own event, the Team Liquid StarCraft League (TSL), and the creation of the North American Star League (NASL).

Blizzard and GOMTV signed an agreement on 26 May 2010, allowing the latter to create and broadcast the GSL starting with a series of three open tournaments, each with a US$170,000 prize pool, in South Korea. This agreement followed the decision from Blizzard to cease negotiations with KeSPA, and it confirmed that Blizzard had decided to work with a different partner to promote StarCraft II as an esport in South Korea. The non-profit public interest group Public Knowledge made the following statement regarding the issue: "The Battle.net Terms of Use state that it is a violation of the agreement—and an infringement of Blizzard's copyright in the underlying game—to "use the Service for any 'e-sports' or group competition sponsored, promoted or facilitated by any commercial or non-profit entity without Blizzard's prior written consent." Following the GSL's transition into a regular league format in 2011 with two tiers of play, Code S and Code A, the first professional Korean team league for StarCraft II was started by GOMTV, the Global StarCraft II Team League (GSTL). Alongside it, the e-Sports Federation (eSF) was founded to represent the teams participating in the team league.

=== KeSPA transition and peak ===
Late 2011 and 2012 constituted the peak of StarCraft II as the largest esport in the world, with the transition of KeSPA and associated tournaments StarCraft Proleague (SPL) and Ongamenet Starleague (OSL) to StarCraft II. 2012 saw the founding of the Blizzard-sanctioned and organized World Championship Series (WCS). StarCraft II remained the most viewed, sponsored, and active esport in the world and, for the first time since its release, clearly took over StarCraft's position in South Korea as all professional teams and both leagues transitioned to it.

Years after negotiations had ended, Blizzard and KeSPA once again renewed conversation which resulted in KeSPA receiving a license from Blizzard in 2012 and Ongamenet announcing StarCraft II competitions starting in the summer of 2012. This brought them into direct competition with the GSL and GSTL and led to a team league split which had eSF teams playing in GSTL and KeSPA teams playing in SPL. The WCS featured over 30 LAN events and culminated in the largest StarCraft II event until then in China as part of the Battle.net World Championship Series Global Finals.

=== Decline and end of Proleague ===
Starting with the release of Heart of the Swarm in early 2013, the WCS transitioned into a league format as Blizzard strengthened its hold on professional StarCraft II competition with the introduction of WCS points that decided who would qualify for the year's biggest tournament, the WCS Global Finals. This led to fewer non-WCS events yearly as 2014 marked Major League Gaming's last StarCraft II event, the second large blow to the North American scene following the last NASL event in late 2012. Non-Korean competition quickly became focused almost exclusively on WCS events, unlike the largely decentralized competitive circuits of the years prior.

In Korea with the peak of the eSF and KeSPA rivalry, KeSPA came out on top for team competition as the GSTL ended its second season of 2013 and its last. Teams that remained from the eSF after the end of GSTL transitioned to Proleague through the 2014 and 2015 seasons. However, the KeSPA-backed individual league OSL folded in 2013 following its second overall StarCraft II season and its only one that year. The only individual league that remained for 2014 was the GSL. Throughout the following years the GSL was joined by the StarCraft II StarLeague (SSL), while Proleague folded following its first and only Legacy of the Void season in 2016 following a matchfixing scandal that saw one of the game's most successful players, Lee "Life" Seung-Hyun, permanently banned from competing. The end of team competition in Korea marked the low point of the game's scene in the country and was accompanied by a resurgence in interest in StarCraft: Brood War professional competition.

=== Resurgence ===
In late 2017 the StarCraft II Warchest was introduced, featuring cosmetic rewards and an unlocking system to accompany them. For each purchase 25% of sales went to funding StarCraft II esports, and the funding target for BlizzCon 2017, a crowdfunding of $200,000, was reached within the first of three stages of the crowdfunding. The rest of the funds gained went into funding other events throughout the following months and year. New War Chests were released for both the IEM World Championship 2018, raising the prize pool by the targeted $150,000 within the first stage again, and BlizzCon 2018, raising the prize pool by the targeted $200,000 within the first stage once more.

During BlizzCon 2017, Blizzard Entertainment announced that StarCraft II would become free-to-play starting 14 November 2017. This included the Wings of Liberty campaign, full Legacy of the Void multiplayer and co-op access, and the custom games section called the Arcade, for everyone. This led to a resurgence in interest and player base as StarCraft II viewership surged in 2018, with many events showing great improvements, some over double their 2017 viewership. This included the GSL vs. the World 2018 tournament, the first GSL event to be won by a non-Korean, Finnish player Joona "Serral" Sotala. It became the highest-viewed Korean tournament outside of Korea for StarCraft II. Television network viewership has not been available for domestic comparison.

StarCraft II also saw growth and recognition as an international competitive sport, as it was featured at an exhibition tournament prior to the 2018 Winter Olympics at the Intel-sponsored IEM PyeongChang, which was won by Canada's Sasha "Scarlett" Hostyn, and the game was also featured as part of the 2018 Asian Games esports exhibition, an event won by South Korea's Cho "Maru" Seong-ju.

=== Change to ESL/DreamHack ===
From 2020 to 2023, Blizzard partnered with esports organizers ESL and DreamHack for a period of three years, where tournament qualification format would change to weekly cups, and the global finals would no longer be held at BlizzCon, rather the Intel Extreme Masters event would serve that purpose. This new system is denominated ESL Pro Tour.

== List of StarCraft II World Champions ==
Year	Host	Winner	Score	Runner-up
World Championship Series Era
2012; Details	(China) Shanghai	Won "PartinG" Lee-sak (P) South Korea	4–2	Jang "Creator" Hyun-woo (P) South Korea
2013; Details	(United States) Anaheim	Kim "sOs" Yoo-jin (P) South Korea	4–1	Lee "Jaedong" Jae-dong (Z) South Korea
2014; Details	(United States) Anaheim	no champion, because the winner was later convicted of match fixing		
2015; Details	(United States) Anaheim	Kim "sOs" Yoo-jin (P) South Korea	4–3	Lee "Life" Seung-hyun (Z) South Korea
2016; Details	(United States) Anaheim	Byun "ByuN" Hyun-woo (T) South Korea	4–2	Park "Dark" Ryung-woo (Z) South Korea
2017; Details	(United States) Anaheim	Lee "Rogue" Byung-ryul (Z) South Korea	4–2	Eo "soO" Yoon-su (Z) South Korea
2018; Details	(United States) Anaheim	Joona "Serral" Sotala (Z) Finland	4–2	Kim "Stats" Dae-yeob (P) South Korea
2019; Details	(United States) Anaheim	Park "Dark" Ryung-woo (Z) South Korea	4-1	Riccardo "Reynor" Romiti (Z) Italy
ESL Pro Tour Era
2021; Details	(Poland) Katowice	Riccardo "Reynor" Romiti (Z) Italy	4-2	Joo "Zest" Sung-wook (P) South Korea
2022; Details	(Poland) Katowice	Joona "Serral" Sotala (Z) Finland	4-3	Riccardo "Reynor" Romiti (Z) Italy
2023; Details	(Poland) Katowice	Li "Oliveira" Peinan (T) China	4-1	Cho "Maru" Seong-ju (T) South Korea
Esports World Cup Era
2024; Details	(Saudi Arabia) Riyadh	Clément "Clem" Desplanches (T) France	5-0	Joona "Serral" Sotala (Z) Finland
2025; Details	(Saudi Arabia) Riyadh	Joona "Serral" Sotala (Z) Finland	5-2	Kim "Classic" Doh-Woo (P) South Korea

== International competition ==
=== Asian Games ===
Starcraft II was part of an electronic sports demonstration event during the Asian Games 2018 held in Indonesia. Eight countries participated after qualifying from their respective regions with Indonesia automatically qualifying as host.

Year	Gold	Silver	Bronze
2018 Jakarta-Palembang	Cho "Maru" Seong-ju; South Korea	Huang "Nice" Yu-hsiang; Chinese Taipei	Trần "MeomaikA" Hồng Phúc; Vietnam

=== Asian Indoor and Martial Arts Games ===
Starcraft II has been part of the electronic sports event at the Asian Indoor and Martial Arts Games since 2013. The 2017 event in Turkmenistan was boycotted by some countries including the previous winner South Korea. Electronic sports in the 2017 event were also no longer recognized as an official sport and became a demonstration sport instead, to accompany electronic sports' status at the Asian Games.

Year (Version)	Gold	Silver	Bronze
2013 (Heart of the Swarm)	Kim Yoo-jin; South Korea	Lee Young-ho; South Korea	Li Junfeng; China
2017 (Legacy of the Void)	Zhou Hang; China	Wang Lei; China	Bataagiin Ononbat; Mongolia
