= 2019 StarCraft II World Championship Series =

Esports tournament

2019 StarCraft II World Championship Series Global Finals
- 2019

Tournament information
- Sport: StarCraft II
- Location: Anaheim, California
- Administrator: Blizzard Entertainment
- Venue: Anaheim Convention Center
- Purse: $700,000

Final positions
- Champion: Park "Dark" Ryung Woo
- Runner-up: Riccardo "Reynor" Romiti

The 2019 StarCraft II World Championship Series (WCS) was the 2019 edition of the StarCraft II World Championship Series, the top esports tournament circuit for StarCraft II. The tournament series' Global Finals were won by South Korean professional player Park "Dark" Ryung Woo.

== Format ==
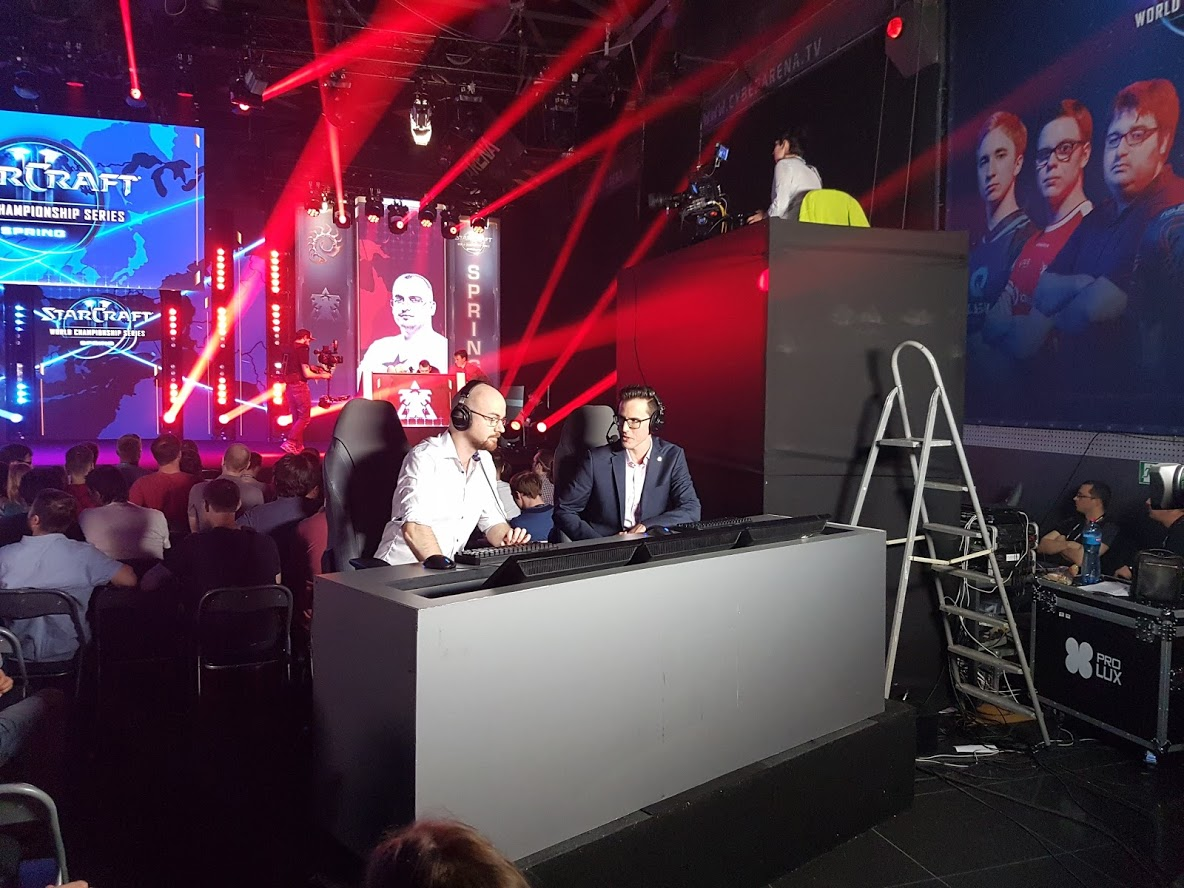
Benjamin "DeMusliM" Baker and Jared "PiG" Krensel casting WCS Spring event

The 2019 StarCraft II World Championship Series was separated into two regions, WCS Korea and WCS Circuit. The format of the former remained consistent with the standard set in 2017, featuring three seasons of the long-running Global StarCraft II League (GSL) Code S with two smaller GSL Super Tournament events interspersed. The format of the latter region, however, replaced one of the standard four large WCS Circuit events with WCS Winter, separated into WCS Winter Europe and WCS Winter America, two smaller tournaments with an online portion and an in-person playoff portion. Beyond this, the format remained unchanged, with three large WCS Circuit events and accompanying qualifiers under the WCS Challenger branding. Two shared World Championship Series Global events featured players from both regions before the Global Finals. All these events, excluding the second WCS Global event, GSL vs. the World, gave out WCS Circuit and/or WCS Korea points that determined the seeding of the Global Finals.

=== Seeding ===
Eight players from each WCS region qualify for the event based on their WCS points-based rankings. Winners of WCS Circuit stops, GSL Code S events, and IEM Katowice receive automatic qualification. Based on their region-specific ranking, the sixteen players are then seeded into four four-player groups for the first round. A draw is held for the quarterfinals bracket, with winners of each group facing second-place finishers of other groups.

== Results ==
=== Global Finals ===
The WCS Global Finals were held at the Anaheim Convention Center in Anaheim, California, as part of BlizzCon 2019. They featured a group stage as the first round of play, played out the week before the main event, followed by bracket play from the quarterfinals onward at the convention center. For the first time ever, the event was confined to one of the two days the convention ran for, with all matches from the quarterfinals through the finals happening on November 1, Friday.

Quarterfinals		Semifinals		Finals
(Finland) Serral	3
(South Korea) soO	0	(Finland) Serral	2
(Italy) Reynor	3	(Italy) Reynor	3
(South Korea) Trap	2			(Italy) Reynor	1
(South Korea) Rogue	2			(South Korea) Dark	4
(South Korea) Classic	3	(South Korea) Classic	0
(South Korea) Dark	3	(South Korea) Dark	3
(South Korea) Maru	0
