= 2015 StarCraft II World Championship Series =

Esports tournament

2015 StarCraft II World Championship Series Global Finals
- 2015

Tournament information
- Sport: StarCraft II
- Location: Anaheim, California
- Administrator: Blizzard Entertainment
- Venue: Anaheim Convention Center
- Purse: $250,000

Final positions
- Champion: Kim "sOs" Yoo Jin
- Runner-up: Lee "Life" Seung Hyun

The 2015 StarCraft II World Championship Series (WCS) is the 2015 edition of the StarCraft II World Championship Series, the highest level of esports competition for StarCraft II. The tournament series' Global Finals were won by South Korean professional player Kim "sOs" Yoo Jin, becoming the first two-time StarCraft II world champion.

== Format ==
The 2015 StarCraft II World Championship Series introduced greater region-locking restrictions in reaction to Korean dominance across all WCS leagues. WCS America and Europe's Premier and Challenger leagues were merged into a shared league, dropping the continental naming convention. In Korea, a second Korean league formed alongside the long-running Global StarCraft II League (GSL), SPOTV's StarCraft II StarLeague (SSL), replacing the defunct Ongamenet Starleague (OSL). Both Korean leagues featured three seasons of regular play, as did the WCS Premier League.

=== Seeding ===
All WCS-sanctioned events gave out points to players based on their ranking and the event's tier. The sixteen highest-ranking players received invites to the Global Finals, seeded into a bracket based on their rank. As there were two players tied for the 16th seed, a tie-breaker match was held prior to the commencement of the Global Finals.

== Results ==
=== Global Finals ===
The WCS Global Finals were held at the Anaheim Convention Center in Anaheim, California as part of BlizzCon 2015. They featured bracket play in the round of sixteen, played out the week prior to the main event as part of BlizzCon Opening Week, with the quarterfinals onward at the convention center itself.

Quarterfinals		Semifinals		Finals
(South Korea) herO	1
(South Korea) Classic	3	(South Korea) Classic	2
(South Korea) INnoVation	1	(South Korea) Life	3
(South Korea) Life	3			(South Korea) Life	3
(South Korea) Rain	0			(South Korea) sOs	4
(South Korea) sOs	3	(South Korea) sOs	3
(South Korea) Hydra	1	(South Korea) Rogue	0
(South Korea) Rogue	3
