= 2016 StarCraft II World Championship Series =

Esports tournament

2016 StarCraft II World Championship Series Global Finals
- 2016

Tournament information
- Sport: StarCraft II
- Location: Anaheim, California
- Administrator: Blizzard Entertainment
- Venue(s): Anaheim Convention Center
- Purse: $500,000

Final positions
- Champion: Byun "ByuN" Hyun Woo
- Runner-up: Park "Dark" Ryung Woo

The 2016 StarCraft II World Championship Series (WCS) is the 2016 edition of the StarCraft II World Championship Series, the highest level of esports competition for StarCraft II. The tournament series' Global Finals were won by South Korean professional player Byun "ByuN" Hyun Woo.

== Format ==
The 2016 StarCraft II World Championship Series continued the trend of increasing region-locking and residency restrictions. Competition was separated into two regions, World Championship Series Circuitand World Championship Series Korea. The WCS Circuit transitioned from a league format with three seasons per year to a tournament circuit with three stops. WCS Korea featured two seasons each of the two Korean leagues, afreecaTV's Global StarCraft II League (GSL), and SPOTV's StarCraft II StarLeague.

Unlike previous seasons which ranked players purely by WCS points, 2016's WCS guaranteed 8 slots of the Global Finals to each of the two regions, guaranteeing a larger non-Korean presence. The prize pool for the Global Finals was doubled, from $250,000 in 2015 to $500,000 in 2016. Additionally, a group stage was introduced for the first time for the first stage of play, with four groups of four players feeding into a bracket from the quarterfinals to the finals.

=== Seeding ===
Eight players from each of the two WCS regions qualify to the event based on their WCS Points-based rankings. Winners of WCS Circuit stops, GSL Code S events, and SSL Premier events receive automatic qualification. The sixteen players are then seeded into four four-player groups for the first round based on their region-specific ranking. A draw is held for the quarterfinals bracket, with winners of each group facing second-place finishers of other groups.

== Results ==
=== Global Finals ===
The WCS Global Finals were held at the Anaheim Convention Center in Anaheim, California as part of BlizzCon 2016. They featured a group stage as the first round of play, played out the week prior to the main event, followed by bracket play from the quarterfinals onward at the convention center itself.

| Quarterfinals | | Semifinals | | Finals |
| (Germany) ShoWTimE | 1 |
| (Poland) Elazer | 3 | (Poland) Elazer | 0 |
| (South Korea) Dark | 3 | (South Korea) Dark | 3 |
| (United States) Neeblet | 0 | | | (South Korea) Dark | 2 |
| (South Korea) TY | 1 | | | (South Korea) ByuN | 4 |
| (South Korea) ByuN | 3 | (South Korea) ByuN | 3 |
| (South Korea) Zest | 2 | (South Korea) Stats | 1 |
| (South Korea) Stats | 3 |
