= 2017 StarCraft II World Championship Series =

Esports tournament

2017 StarCraft II World Championship Series Global Finals
- 2017

Tournament information
- Sport: StarCraft II
- Location: Anaheim, California, U.S.
- Administrator: Blizzard Entertainment
- Venue: Anaheim Convention Center
- Purse: $700,000

Final positions
- Champion: Lee "Rogue" Byung Ryul
- Runner-up: Eo "soO" Yoon Soo

The 2017 StarCraft II World Championship Series (WCS) is the 2017 edition of the StarCraft II World Championship Series, the highest level of esports competition for StarCraft II. The tournament series' Global Finals were won by South Korean professional player Lee "Rogue" Byung Ryul.

== Format ==
For the first time since the tournament circuit's founding in 2012, the 2017 StarCraft II World Championship Series introduced a format that would stay consistent for two years. Competition was separated into two regions, WCS Circuit and WCS Korea. The former featured four large events with accompanying qualifiers under the WCS Challenger branding, while the latter featured three seasons of the long-running Global StarCraft II League (GSL) Code S with two smaller GSL Super Tournament events interspersed. Two shared World Championship Series Global events featured players from both regions prior to the Global Finals. All these events gave out WCS Circuit and/or WCS Korea points that determined the seeding of the Global Finals. Other events including two of ESL's Intel Extreme Masters and SPOTV's StarCraft II StarLeague also gave out points and were announced at later dates, separately from the main WCS format.

Another introduction to the circuit was crowdfunding, as Blizzard Entertainment introduced the War Chest to crowdfund StarCraft II esports, adding $200,000 to the prize pool of the 2017 Global Finals.

=== Seeding ===
Eight players from each WCS region qualify to the event based on their WCS points-based rankings. Winners of WCS Circuit stops, GSL Code S events, and IEM Katowice receive automatic qualification. The sixteen players are then seeded into four four-player groups for the first round based on their region-specific ranking. A draw is held for the quarterfinals bracket, with winners of each group facing second-place finishers of other groups.

== Results ==
=== Global Finals ===
The WCS Global Finals were held at the Anaheim Convention Center in Anaheim, California as part of BlizzCon 2017. They featured a group stage as the first round of play, played out the week prior to the main event, followed by bracket play from the quarterfinals onward at the convention center itself.

Quarterfinals		Semifinals		Finals
(Mexico) SpeCial	3
(Poland) Elazer	1	(Mexico) SpeCial	0
(South Korea) soO	3	(South Korea) soO	3
(South Korea) GuMiho	2			(South Korea) soO	2
(South Korea) herO	1			(South Korea) Rogue	4
(South Korea) Rogue	3	(South Korea) Rogue	3
(South Korea) INnoVation	2	(South Korea) TY	2
(South Korea) TY	3
