= World Championship Series =

The World Championship Series may refer to:

- NBA World Championship Series, former name of the NBA Finals basketball competition (1950–1985)
- StarCraft II World Championship Series, former video game competition (2012–2019)
- Virginia Slims World Championship Series, former women's tennis competition (1970–1989)

== See also ==
- World Series, North American baseball competition
