= Battle.net World Championship Series =

- Sport: StarCraft II; World of Warcraft; Hearthstone
- Founded: 2012
- Director: Blizzard Entertainment

The Battle.net World Championship Series (BWCS) was the shared branding for video game tournaments held by Blizzard Entertainment for their games StarCraft II (SC2) and World of Warcraft (WoW) in 2012. The StarCraft II event series, the StarCraft II World Championship Series, maintained the World Championship Series branding beyond the year and continued to use it until being replaced by the ESL Pro Tour StarCraft II in 2020, but the Battle.net World Championship Series brand was not used beyond 2012.

== Event Series ==
- The 2012 StarCraft II World Championship Series, the first edition of the StarCraft II World Championship Series, was the only one played on StarCraft II: Wings of Liberty. The tournament series included over 30 LAN events.
- The 2012 World of Warcraft Arena World Championship was the World of Warcraft series of tournaments. It was played on both the Cataclysm and the Mists of Pandaria expansions, as the latter released before the end of the tournament series and the finals were held on it.
