= StarCraft II World Championship Series =

Defunct professional esports circuit

- Most recent season or competition: 2019 StarCraft II World Championship Series
- Sport: StarCraft II
- Founded: 2012
- Folded: 2019
- Replaced by: ESL Pro Tour
- Owner: Blizzard Entertainment
- Last champion: Park "Dark" Ryung Woo
- Most titles: Kim "sOs" Yoo-jin (2)
- Broadcaster: Twitch
- Related competitions: Global StarCraft II League; Dreamhack; Intel Extreme Masters
- Website: wcs.starcraft2.com

The StarCraft II World Championship Series (WCS) was a StarCraft II professional tournament series organized and sanctioned by Blizzard Entertainment that ran from 2012 to 2019. For all but its first year of operation, it was the highest tier of professional StarCraft II competition. Its longest-running iteration featured two regions, World Championship Series Korea and World Championship Series Circuit, with World Championship Series Global events featuring players from both regions. Grand finals were held annually at BlizzCon in Anaheim, California, except for the first year of competition, when the finals were held in Shanghai, China. WCS Circuit events were streamed on Twitch while WCS Korea events were available on Twitch, YouTube, and afreecaTV.

World Championship Series Korea professional competition was centered on events organized by afreecaTV under the Global StarCraft II League (GSL) name, including GSL Code S seasons and GSL Super Tournament events. World Championship Series Circuit professional competition centered on tournaments held under the World Championship Series Circuit name with qualifiers held for each under the World Championship Series Challenger name.

World Championship Global competition featured two large events each year. These were ESL's Intel Extreme Masters World Championship event in Katowice, Poland, and afreecaTV's GSL vs. the World event in Seoul, Korea. For its final two iterations as part of the WCS system, the former has had its prize pool crowdfunded, as did the Global Finals event for its final three iterations. This was done through the StarCraft II War Chest system, which allowed players to purchase cosmetic items in game with 25% of sales going towards funding the professional scene.

== History ==
=== Founding (2012) ===
The StarCraft II World Championship Series was founded alongside a move to share branding among Blizzard Entertainment's competitive games and tournaments under the name Battle.net World Championship Series, which also included World of Warcraft competition. The first year of competition, the 2012 StarCraft II World Championship Series, featured over 30 events including national and continental championships that fed into the grand finals of the year held in Shanghai, China alongside the World of Warcraft finals. Events were limited to a few days or weeks of play with nationality-based limitations. This format lead to the series of events being well-viewed but not considered the peak of StarCraft II competition, especially all events that featured no Koreans and strict nationality requirements for players of the respective nationality or continent.

The shared branding initiative ended as starting with 2013, the respective games' events no longer culminated in the Battle.net World Championship and instead ended under separate names as more Blizzard games came to have their own professional circuits run by the company.

=== Transition to league format (2013–2014) ===
Coinciding with the release of StarCraft II's first expansion pack, Heart of the Swarm, the World Championship Series' format was changed drastically to center around Blizzard-run events, turning it into the highest level of professional StarCraft II competition. Starting with the 2013 season, the WCS transitioned to a GSL-inspired league format where seasons would run over multiple weeks and months. These leagues were played under the name WCS Premier League with the lower tier of competition named WCS Challenger, analogous to the GSL's Code S and Code A respectively. Korean StarCraft II leagues upon which this new format was based were included in this transition and came under the WCS banner, with WCS points being given out alongside prize money to define who would qualify for the Global Finals. Nationality requirements were removed for the first year of the new league format and though reintroduced in 2014, region-locking remained minimal. This led to Korean players, historically dominant in professional competition for both the original StarCraft and StarCraft II, winning all leagues across all regions for both years of open league play. 2013s WCS featured cross-league seasonal finals, while those were removed for the 2014 season.

Both of Korea's individual leagues, Ongamenet's Ongamenet Starleague (OSL) and GOMTV's Global StarCraft II League (GSL), were included in this new WCS format in 2013. The leagues alternated, with the first and last seasons of WCS 2013 in Korea being GSL events, and the second being an OSL event. In 2014, all Korean leagues were GSL events as the OSL had officially ceased operations.

=== Region-locking and end of non-Korean leagues (2015–2016) ===
In 2015, non-Korean leagues were consolidated into one, the WCS Premier League, while the Korean region saw the introduction of a new Korean league to run alongside the GSL, the StarCraft II StarLeague (SSL) organized by SPOTV. For the first time since the transition to a league format, harsh region-locking restrictions were introduced which lead to the first non-Korean WCS Premier League champion, though some Korean players managed to continue competing by moving to the United States and participating under the new residency requirements.

In 2016, coinciding with the release of StarCraft II's second expansion, Legacy of the Void, the format of the WCS was once again vastly changed. After 2015s consolidation, the WCS Premier League was completely phased out in favor of regional qualifiers and large weekend tournaments. The regional qualifiers took up the name of the lower flight of Premier League competition, and became WCS Challenger. Starting in 2016, Korean and non-Korean WCS rankings were separated, with the newly created WCS Korea and WCS Circuit rankings each constituting half of the seeds into the year's Global Finals.

=== Standardized format (2017–2019) ===
In late 2016 after the 2016 Global Finals, for the first time since the start of the World Championship Series, Blizzard announced a standard format that would remain unchanged for both 2017 and 2018, as all previous event years had featured large changes each year. There would now be three seasons of Korea's GSL Code S, joined by shorter week-long GSL Super Tournaments for WCS Korea, and four weekend events for WCS Circuit, with regional Challenger qualifiers held for six regions. Two official WCS Global tournaments would be held, IEM Katowice and GSL vs. the World. While other events could be included in the WCS if they covered given requirements, this was the official lineup of events for both 2017 and 2018.

Also starting in 2017, crowdfunding was introduced in the form of a War Chest system that allowed players to purchase cosmetic items in-game with 25% of revenue from purchases going to increasing the prize pool of a given event to a point, beyond which money would go to funding competitive play in general. The first event to have its prize pool increased was the 2017 WCS Global Finals, which received $200,000, the targeted amount, within the first of three stages of the crowdfunding. Since then, it has been used to crowdfund $200,000 for latter Global Finals and $150,000 for IEM Katowice events.

In 2019, one stop for the year's World Championship Series was replaced by a pair of online leagues with live in-studio finals, WCS Winter America and WCS Winter Europe. Two of the three remaining WCS Circuit stops were organized by Star Ladder, significantly lowering Dreamhack's participation in the circuit with just one stop compared to all four for the previous two years. Despite the changes in organizer partnerships, the tournament circuit format remained unchanged beyond the inclusion of WCS Winter.

=== End of WCS (2020) ===
In early 2020, Blizzard announced the end of the World Championship Series in favor of the creation of a new professional circuit, the ESL Pro Tour StarCraft II (EPT) run by ESL and Dreamhack with prizing funded by Blizzard. While the format of events run by Dreamhack would remain unchanged from the WCS Circuit, changes to the overall structure of the tournament were announced, including the final event of each year of competition being moved from BlizzCon to IEM Katowice. The EPT was announced with a commitment of three years of competition and prizing including a one-off increase in prize pools for events in 2020 for StarCraft II's tenth anniversary.

== Results ==
Year	Winner	Score	Runner-up
2012; Details	Won "PartinG" Lee-sak; South Korea	4–2	Jang "Creator" Hyun Woo; South Korea
2013; Details	Kim "sOs" Yoo-jin; South Korea	4–1	Lee "Jaedong" Jae-dong; South Korea
2014; Details	Lee "Life" Seung Hyun; South Korea	4–1	Mun "MMA" Seong Won; South Korea
2015; Details	Kim "sOs" Yoo-jin; South Korea	4–3	Lee "Life" Seung Hyun; South Korea
2016; Details	Byun "ByuN" Hyun Woo; South Korea	4–2	Park "Dark" Ryung Woo; South Korea
2017; Details	Lee "Rogue" Byung Ryul; South Korea	4–2	Eo "soO" Yoon Su; South Korea
2018; Details	Joona "Serral" Sotala; Finland	4–2	Kim "Stats" Dae Yeob; South Korea
2019; Details	Park "Dark" Ryung Woo; South Korea	4–1	Riccardo "Reynor" Romiti; Italy
