= StarCraft II: Legacy of the Void =

- StarCraft II: Legacy of the Void cover artwork, depicting protagonist Artanis
- Developer: Blizzard Entertainment
- Publisher: Blizzard Entertainment
- Director: Dustin Browder
- Producers: Tim Morten; Chris Sigaty
- Designer: Jason Huck
- Artist: Samwise Didier
- Writers: Chris Metzen; James Waugh
- Composer: Jason Hayes
- Series: StarCraft
- Platforms: Microsoft Windows macOS
- Release: November 10, 2015
- Genre: Real-time strategy
- Modes: Single-player, multiplayer

StarCraft II: Legacy of the Void is a standalone expansion pack to the military science fiction real-time strategy game StarCraft II: Wings of Liberty, and the third and final part of the StarCraft II trilogy developed by Blizzard Entertainment. The game was released on November 10, 2015.

The expansion includes additional units and multiplayer changes from StarCraft II: Heart of the Swarm, as well as a continuing campaign focusing on the Protoss race. The campaign, which focuses on Artanis as its protagonist, is a sequel to Wings of Liberty and Heart of the Swarm, and concludes the StarCraft II trilogy. Blizzard launched its invite-only beta testing of the game on March 31, 2015. The testing closed on November 2, 2015, a week before the November 10 release date.

The pre-order of the game was announced and made available for purchase on Battle.net and major game retailers on July 15, 2015. Pre-ordering the game granted immediate access to the multiplayer beta and a set of three prologue missions titled Whispers of Oblivion, which were subsequently made available to all players following the Heart of the Swarm 3.0 update on October 6, 2015.

== Gameplay ==
The single-player campaign features an even number of missions similar to Wings of Liberty and Heart of the Swarm and centers around the Protoss character Artanis, hierarch of the Khalai Protoss and the Nerazim (Dark Templar). Legacy of the Void's campaign focuses on the Protoss and concludes the events of the StarCraft II trilogy.

Like the two preceding games, the briefing room allows interactive exploration but this time on board a Protoss Arkship known as the Spear of Adun. Missions are accessed through a Protoss version of Hyperion's "Star Map" known as the Celestial Array. Artanis' goal is to unify the Protoss and stand against Amon, a fallen Xel'Naga who wishes to reshape the universe in his image. Other characters, including Jim Raynor and Sarah Kerrigan, play smaller parts in the story as well. Game writer Chris Metzen has likened the story to that of the film 300, with a small force engaging a much more powerful one in a desperate last stand.

=== Multiplayer ===
Several multiplayer game mechanics were modified in Legacy of the Void. Most notably, the resource system was changed in order to encourage aggression and territorial control, and to minimize a lack of action at the beginning of multiplayer games. Changes include decreasing resource quantity and increasing the number of workers spawned at the beginning of the game. Specific changes were also made to the abilities and mechanics of each playable race. The game is still being modified and balanced to this day, resulting in some of the changes described being outdated.

==== Protoss ====
The Protoss no longer have the Photon Overcharge ability. Chrono Boost can apply to multiple structures, and gives a good boost to production for a small amount of time. If used for full duration, it saves 10 seconds on production. The Oracle from Heart of the Swarm now has its Revelation and Envision abilities combined into one. It can now also cast a Stasis Ward, an invisible mine-like structure that, when detonated, traps units in a small radius in stasis, much like the Stasis Field ability from the Arbiter of StarCraft: Brood War. The Warp Prism, the trademark Protoss air transport, now has the ability to pick up units at a longer, safer range, but still must get on point to unload any cargo or deploy its psionic field utilized to warp-in Protoss units. The Carrier now has the ability to launch interceptors at a longer range and safer distance. The Immortal loses its trademark Hardened Shields from HotS and WoL, and instead receives the new "Barrier" ability, which mitigates damage temporarily. As for new units, the Protoss receive the Adept, a Gateway/Warp Gate unit which excels against light-class units like the Terran Marine or Zerg Hydralisk and can use "Psionic Transfer", creating a psionic copy of the unit to which the Adept teleports after a few seconds, favoring hit-and-run tactics. Another new unit is the Disruptor, built from the Robotics Facility and requiring the Robotics Bay. It attacks by discharging a ball of energy which can be player-controlled and directed at the opponent, dealing massive damage. The Disruptor is reminiscent of the Protoss Reaver from Brood War in that precise micromanagement is required to deliver greater damage.

==== Terran ====
The Terrans remain virtually unaltered of their macro-mechanics inherited from Wings of Liberty, meaning they can still deploy MULEs and Extra Supplies. The Banshee receives a speed upgrade which can be researched at a Tech Lab. The Battlecruiser can now warp instantly to any location, regardless of visibility. The Reaper from Heart of the Swarm gains a grenade-like ability that deals minimal damage, but knocks back and temporarily stuns enemy units. The Widow Mine remains unaltered, except it now has a targeting beam when it fires, which gives further warning to opponents. For new units, the Terrans receive the Cyclone, a Factory-built unit that can lock on and move while firing at air targets only (it can automatically auto-attack ground units), similar to the Protoss Phoenix. Another new Terran unit is the Liberator, which can engage aircraft with its normal area-of-effect attack, but can also transform to deploy a powerful cannon to attack ground targets. The ground attack mode has a range upgrade which can be researched through the Fusion Core.

==== Zerg ====
The main alteration to Zerg macro-mechanics is the reduction of extra Larvae produced by Queens per Hatchery, from 4 in HotS/WoL to 3 in Legacy of the Void, and additionally the Spawn Larvae ability can now be used multiple times on Hatcheries to queue Larvae production. For units, the Swarm Host, to accommodate for the returning Brood War Lurker, no longer burrows and has its role altered to a "siege assault" unit, able to spawn its Locust while moving and unburrowed. The Corruptor has its Corruption ability removed and replaced with "Caustic Spray", with which it can target ground buildings endlessly until they are destroyed. The Nydus Worm is altered so that it remains invulnerable while being constructed, removing the opponent's capacity of destroying them before completion with workers. For new units, the Zerg receive the Ravager, an evolution from Roaches (akin to Lurkers from Hydralisks and Banelings from Zerglings) and can use a "Corrosive Bile" special ability that acts like "focused artillery", focusing on a specific location and dealing damage to anything it hits, including air units.

== Plot ==
=== Prologue: Whispers of Oblivion ===
Some time before events of Wings of Liberty, Zeratul searches to unravel the final piece of the Xel'Naga prophecy, which requires him to find the place of Amon's resurrection. To uncover this, Zeratul travels to a Terran installation where he is contacted by Praetor Talis, one of Artanis' commanders. Talis explains that Protoss are captured and experimented upon by the Terrans and requests Zeratul's help. When arriving on the Terran-controlled station, Zeratul encounters Kerrigan and her Swarm, who seek to destroy the facility. Zeratul must race Kerrigan to free the captured Protoss and acquire the location of Amon's resurrection.

After completing his task Zeratul and Talis set off to the planet Atrias, where a Xel'Naga Temple is located. Before Zeratul can enter the temple, he must fight his way through a force of Tal'Darim Protoss, fanatically loyal to Amon. They are led by Highlord Ma'lash, who communes with Amon to receive instructions. Zeratul is successful in defeating the Tal'Darim and enters the temple. Inside he must again fight his way through Tal'Darim forces and destroy a structure known as the "Void Catalyst". This structure appears to allow the Tal'Darim to contact Amon and use its energies to empower them. After the Void Catalyst is destroyed, Zeratul is contacted by what appears to be Tassadar in spirit form, who instructs Zeratul to find the Keystone. Shortly after this, Amon himself attempts to kill Zeratul by collapsing the temple. Talis sacrifices herself and her forces to give Zeratul enough time to escape Amon's wrath. With the last fragment of the prophecy fulfilled, Zeratul sets off to warn Artanis about his findings.

=== Legacy of the Void ===
Artanis leads the Golden Armada in an invasion of their Zerg-infested homeworld of Aiur, abandoned since the Brood War six years earlier; Zeratul arrives to warn Artanis of Amon's return, but the invasion proceeds regardless. Amon awakens on Aiur and takes control of the majority of the Protoss race through the Khala, the telepathic bond that unites all emotions for the Khalai and Templar factions of the Protoss. Only Zeratul and the Nerazim, the Dark Templar, remain unaffected as a result of their ritualistic cutting of their nerve cords, which has severed their connection to the Khala. Zeratul and the Nerazim scramble to save as many of the Aiur Protoss as they can by severing their nerve cords, while fending off Amon's Zerg broods and possessed Protoss. Artanis succumbs to Amon's control and attacks Zeratul, who tries to cut off Artanis' nerve cords without harming him. In his final strike, Zeratul severs Artanis' nerve cords, releasing him from Amon's mind-control, but suffers a mortal wound. As Zeratul dies from Artanis' strike, he urges the Hierarch to combat Amon by going to the planet Korhal to recover the Xel'Naga Keystone – the artifact previously used to de-infest Sarah Kerrigan and free her from Amon's control. With the Golden Armada now under Amon's control, Artanis activates the last remaining Protoss Arkship, the Spear of Adun, to serve as his command ship while evacuating the Protoss who have escaped Amon's control.

In the meantime, Amon's forces within all three races, along with hybrids and beings from the Void, begin to wage war in order to extinguish all life from the Koprulu Sector. On Korhal, Artanis arrives in the middle of a Terran battle between Dominion forces and the rogue Moebius Foundation, now under the control of Amon. The Protoss intervene by aiding Jim Raynor and Emperor Valerian Mengsk in defending the planet from the Moebius Foundation and its hybrids before retrieving the artifact.

With the Keystone secured, Artanis undertakes numerous missions to rebuild the Protoss forces. On the Dark Templar homeworld of Shakuras, the warpgate connecting the planet to Aiur has been reactivated and Amon's forces overwhelm the planet. Upon arrival, Artanis helps Matriarch Vorazun, Raszagal's daughter, evacuate the rest of the Dark Templar before obliterating the planet to deny Amon control of it. Artanis also travels to the planet Glacius, a research facility involved in developing advanced Protoss weaponry. The Protoss discover and reawaken an experimental Purifier in stasis, only for Artanis to discover Fenix's consciousness in the Purifier's machine body.

Utilizing data from the Keystone, Artanis is directed to the Xel'Naga homeworld of Ulnar, a planet-sized temple-like structure hidden within a rift which the Protoss had believed could not sustain life. Upon reaching the inner temple grounds, Artanis comes upon Kerrigan battling Amon's hybrid. Artanis enters into a reluctant alliance with Kerrigan after learning that she also fights against Amon. During their investigation, Artanis and Kerrigan learn of the Xel'Naga's origins. Seeking their help in the war, Artanis and Kerrigan find the Xel'Naga dead, slain by Amon and his forces. Amon opens a gateway to the Void, and Kerrigan and Artanis are ambushed by hybrid and spectral forces from the Void. Meanwhile, the Spear of Adun is infiltrated by Alarak, First Ascendant of the Tal'Darim. Vorazun briefly clashes with Alarak, who claims they have a common enemy and that the Protoss Hierarch is in grave danger. Reluctantly, Vorazun sends Protoss forces to coordinates provided by Alarak. Artanis and Kerrigan are rescued by the timely arrival of their forces.

Alarak reveals Amon as a false prophet; the Tal'Darim believe their faith in Amon will be rewarded through their transformation into hybrids, a belief revealed by Alarak as a lie. Seeking vengeance for Amon's betrayal, Alarak proposes a bargain to Artanis: Artanis would help Alarak overthrow Highlord Ma'lash as leader of the Tal'Darim, and Alarak would remove the Tal'Darim from the conflict, depleting Amon's ranks. Artanis reluctantly agrees and helps Alarak complete the Tal'Darim tradition of Rak'Shir combat to overthrow Ma'lash. Alarak declares the Tal'Darim free from Amon's control, and declares vengeance against his former god.

At the behest of Fenix, Artanis seeks the help of the ancient Purifiers despite the misgivings of his advisers. At Cybros, a facility orbiting the forest world of Endion, Artanis fights through waves of Amon's Zerg to awaken the ancient Purifiers, mechanical soldiers programmed with the preserved minds of legendary Protoss warriors. Created by the now-defunct Protoss Conclave, Purifiers were treated as weapons instead of as fellow templar. This resentment came to a head when the Purifiers rebelled and the Purifier program was shut down. With the help of Fenix, Artanis is able to placate their bitterness and convince them to join his forces while standing together as equals.

With the newly united Protoss forces, Artanis stages another invasion of Aiur while the Golden Armada wreaks destruction in other parts of the sector. After destroying Amon's host body, Artanis is successful in temporarily trapping Amon's consciousness in the Keystone. With the brainwashed Daelaam Protoss temporarily freed from Amon's mind control, Artanis urges them to sever their nerve cords to disconnect themselves from the Khala and deny Amon's consciousness an anchor in real space. The Aiur Protoss sever their nerve cords and Amon is banished into the Void. With Aiur reclaimed and the Protoss unified under the Daelaam, the Protoss begin to rebuild, ushering in a new age of prosperity and peace on their home planet.

=== Epilogue: Into the Void ===
Some time after Amon's defeat on Aiur, Kerrigan sends a psionic call to Raynor and Artanis, directing them back to Ulnar as a staging ground for an invasion of the Void in order to permanently end Amon's threat. The combined Terran/Zerg/Protoss armada successfully breaches Amon's first line of defense, and Alexei Stukov, the Zerg-infested former vice admiral of the United Earth Directorate, kills a resurrected Duran/Narud, revealed to be a Xel'Naga himself, in retaliation for Duran killing Stukov on Braxis during the Brood War. In the process, Artanis, Kerrigan, and Raynor release an imprisoned Xel'Naga named Ouros. Upon Ouros' release, the three heroes learn he was the one who was using Tassadar's visage to guide them and that in order to maintain the Infinite Cycle, a fellow Xel'Naga has to kill Amon. Only Kerrigan at that point is capable of surviving such an ascension. After merging with Ouros' essence, Kerrigan becomes a Xel'Naga. With the help of the joint armada, Kerrigan kills Amon, ordering the remaining armies to flee as her final attack creates a psychic backlash in the Void, ending the conflict once and for all.

Two years after Kerrigan's victory over Amon, Emperor Valerian Mengsk and Admiral Matthew Horner have ushered the Terran Dominion into an age of peace and prosperity. Negotiations with the unified Protoss are making progress and the two races are at peace. Raynor reunites with Kerrigan, who appears in her human form, and leaves Mar Sara. He leaves behind his badge, setting aside the final piece of his troubled past, and is never seen again. Meanwhile, Alarak has declined to accept a permanent alliance with the Daelaam, but allows any Tal'Darim a single chance to join them before leaving to find a new homeworld. The Zerg, now under their new queen Zagara, have aggressively reclaimed Char and the surrounding systems as their new homeworld. As peace gradually settles in, life unexpectedly blooms on previously barren and ravaged worlds in the sector.

== Development ==
The development of StarCraft II was announced on May 19, 2007 at the Blizzard Worldwide Invitational in Seoul, South Korea. At the June 2008 Blizzard Worldwide Invitational, Blizzard Executive Vice President Rob Pardo said that StarCraft II was to be released as a trilogy of games, starting with Wings of Liberty, focused on the Terrans, followed by Heart of the Swarm, revolving around the Zerg, and finally Legacy of the Void, devoted to the Protoss. Blizzard's storyboard team was already working on Heart of the Swarm in early 2010 while Wings of Liberty's game play was refined.

As of 2008, little to no development was going into Legacy of the Void. Work had started on Legacy of the Void story, scripts and missions by March 2013, as Heart of the Swarm neared release. Dustin Browder, the game director of StarCraft II, stated that "we will certainly do our best to reduce the time between expansions", while noting that "efficient and quick game development is not something we have traditionally been great at." As of February 2013, James Waugh is serving as lead writer on Legacy of the Void.

By August 2013, the story for Legacy of the Void was written, much of the cinematics were completed, and voice actors were in the studio recording dialogue for the game. Dustin Browder announced in November 2013 he was satisfied with the game's story, but felt the missions and campaign mechanics needed more work, to make them "feel" like Protoss missions.

In November 2014, Blizzard released additional information for the game. As opposed to earlier information, the expansion won't require the original game, and will be released as a stand-alone expansion. Blizzard also announced the new cooperative game play modes Archon Mode, and Allied Commander. Additionally, new units and unit redesigns for the multiplayer part of the game were showcased. The beta testing started on March 31, 2015 and ended on November 2, 2015. On September 13, 2015, at the WCS Season 3 finals in Kraków, Blizzard announced that the release date would be November 10, 2015.

On June 16, 2015, at E3, Blizzard announced their intent to release a prologue to Legacy of the Void, titled Whispers of Oblivion and consisting of 3 missions. The prologue was made available to anyone who pre-purchased the game. After the October 6, 2015 update to Heart of the Swarm, it was made available to all players. The mini-series is intended to bridge the storyline between Heart of the Swarm and Legacy of the Void.

On October 13, 2015, Blizzard announced a free digital prequel comic book with Artanis being the main protagonist. Titled Artanis: Sacrifice, the comic was written by Matt Burns and James Waugh and illustrated by Edouard Guiton and Emanuele Tenderini. It was released on October 20, 2015.

== Release and reception ==
Reception

Aggregate score
| Aggregator | Score |
|---|---|
| Metacritic | 88/100 |

Review scores
| Publication | Score |
|---|---|
| Game Informer | 8.75/10 |
| GameSpot | 8/10 |
| IGN | 8.9/10 |
| PC Gamer (US) | 91% |

According to Blizzard Entertainment, StarCraft II: Legacy of the Void sold more than 1 million copies worldwide within its first 24 hours of being on sale.

Legacy of the Void has been favorably reviewed. On Metacritic, it currently has an 88/100 rating based on 59 reviews. Softpedia concluded that "Starcraft II deserves its place as one of the most influential releases of the past five years, and this Protoss-focused chapter manages to deliver a fitting end to its core narrative while opening up the multiplayer in some interesting ways."

=== Accolades ===
| Year | Award | Category | Result | Ref. |
|---|---|---|---|---|
| 2016 | Golden Joystick Awards 2016 | Competitive Game of the Year | Nominated | |
| 2016 | 19th Annual D.I.C.E. Awards | Outstanding Achievement in Original Music Composition | Nominated | |
| 2016 | 63rd Golden Reel Awards | Best Sound Editing: Computer Interactive Entertainment | Nominated | |
| 2016 | GameStar's Highest Rated 2015/2016 | Best Strategy Game 2015/2016 | Won | |

== Post-release ==
At BlizzCon 2015, during the "Future of StarCraft II" presentation, it was revealed that Blizzard would be releasing more post-release content for both the single-player and multiplayer game modes. New modes like co-op missions, where players can choose a commander from the StarCraft universe and play in campaign-style missions with a partner, were expanded upon. Lead developer David Kim mentioned that a ladder revamp and separate race matchmaking rating for the multiplayer was in the works and that features like automated tournaments would continue to receive support and changes. New micro content like skins and voice packs, requested by fans, were also announced for a mid to late 2016 release.

To keep players engaged with the story of StarCraft II after the events of Legacy of the Void, additional mission packs were announced. The first pack, called Nova Covert Ops, features a series of nine missions delivered in three episodic installments. It centers on the character Nova. The first episodic installment was released in March 2016, and all missions were released by November 2016.

== Professional competition ==
Professional StarCraft II competition was in decline prior to Legacy of the Void's release. Not long after its release, Blizzard Entertainment's primary sanctioned StarCraft II competition, the StarCraft II World Championship Series, was changed as the format transitioned from a league format, with competition consistently ongoing for weeks or months, to a circuit format, focusing on a few weekend-long events throughout the year. The format for the region of Korea, the most successful country in professional StarCraft II, remained league-focused. These changes did little to stop this as viewership continued to decline through its first two years of release. However, with the introduction of the War Chest in 2017 as a crowdfunding tool for the game's competitive scene and the transition of the multiplayer mode into a free-to-play business model in late 2017, the game has seen an increase in player base and viewership and a general resurgence of interest.

On January 7, 2020, Blizzard announced that they would be retiring the StarCraft II World Championship Series format, instead transitioning Professional competition to the ESL Pro Tour. This format would have ESL (company) manage professional competition for the next three years, with financial backing from Blizzard.
