= BlizzCon =

Annual gaming convention by Blizzard Entertainment

- Logo
- Status: Active
- Genre: Video games
- Venue: Anaheim Convention Center
- Location: Anaheim, California
- Country: United States
- Inaugurated: 2005; 21 years ago
- Most recent: September 12, 2026; 56 days ago
- Next event: TBD
- Attendance: ≈40,000 in 2018
- Organizer: Blizzard Entertainment
- Filing status: Corporate
- Website: blizzcon.com

BlizzCon is an annual gaming convention held by Blizzard Entertainment to promote its major franchises including Warcraft, StarCraft, Diablo, Overwatch, Hearthstone, and Heroes of the Storm.

The first BlizzCon was held in October 2005, and since then, all of the conventions have been held at the Anaheim Convention Center in Anaheim, California, near Blizzard's headquarters in Irvine. The convention features game-related announcements, previews of upcoming Blizzard Entertainment games and content, Q&A sessions and panels, costume contests, and playable versions of various Blizzard games. The closing ceremony has featured concerts by The Offspring, Tenacious D, Foo Fighters, Ozzy Osbourne, Blink-182, Metallica, Linkin Park, "Weird Al" Yankovic, and Muse. Blizzard also hosted a similar event outside the U.S. from 2004 to 2008, known as the Blizzard Worldwide Invitational.

== Tickets and pricing ==
=== General admission (since 2005) ===
General admission tickets are considered to be the baseline experience for BlizzCon. It grants access to all panels across both days; play new games, patches, and expansions; and order exclusive Blizzard merchandise online before the convention. Since its inception in 2005, the prices have changed drastically as its scope and attendees have grown.

- For BlizzCon 2005, tickets were set at US$120.
- For BlizzCon 2007 & 2008, the price was decreased by $20 to US$100.
- For BlizzCon 2009, the price was increased by $25 to $125.
- For BlizzCon 2010, the price was increased by another $25 to $150.
- For BlizzCon 2011 & 2013, the price was increased by another $25 to $175.
- For BlizzCon 2014–2018, the price was increased by another $24 to $199.
- For BlizzCon 2019, the price was increased by $30 to $229.
- For BlizzCon 2023, the price was increased by $70 to $299.
- For BlizzCon 2026, the price decreased by $10 to $289 and there was early-bird pricing of $249.

Each general admission ticket includes a goody bag with items like beta keys for upcoming Blizzard games, exclusive Blizzard paraphernalia, and in-game prizes. The in-game prizes have ranged from pets, transmog, mounts in World of Warcraft & Heroes of the Storm; exclusive card packs for Hearthstone; heroes for Heroes of the Storm; cosmetic wings & pets for Diablo III; skins for Overwatch; and portraits, unit skins, and console skins for Starcraft: Remastered and Starcraft II.

=== Benefit Dinner (2009–2019, 2026) ===
Starting with BlizzCon 2009, the BlizzCon Benefit Dinner, sometimes called the VIPs Dinner, was introduced as an additional ticket option. The dinner donates all net proceeds to the Children's Hospital of Orange County. Guests can meet with game developers, artists, executives, and other Blizzard Entertainment employees.

The tickets included the dinner, signed print of Blizzard artwork, and BlizzCon ticket. In later BlizzCons, reserved seating for the opening ceremony and Community Night on the first day of the show were added as additional benefits. These tickets usually had their own sale date separate from the main ticket. The price for these tickets were:

- $500 for BlizzCon 2009, 2010, 2011 & 2013
- $750 for BlizzCon 2014–2019
- $499 for BlizzCon 2026 Charity Night Addon

=== Portal Pass (2019 - 2023) ===
Beginning with BlizzCon 2019, the Portal Pass was added as an additional ticket option for $550; it effectively replaced the Benefit Dinner option for BlizzCon 2023. It is considered an upgrade over the General Admission ticket. This price was increased by $229 to $799 with BlizzCon 2023. It granted additional access to:

- "Night at the Faire" event in the Darkmoon Faire area the night before BlizzCon starts (BlizzCon 2019 Only)
- Access to the convention halls before general admission (BlizzCon 2019 Only)
- Private viewing lounge with video feeds of the panels
- Rotating set of Blizzard employees and special guests
- Early convention entry on both days to the Portal Pass Lounge Only
- Preferred lines for registration and security
- Preferred parking area
- Private concessions (Introduced with BlizzCon 2023)
- Gameplay experiences (Introduced with BlizzCon 2023)
- Concierge support (Introduced with BlizzCon 2023)

== Event cancellations ==
BlizzCon is typically held every year. However, it has been cancelled six times in 2006, 2012, 2020, 2022, 2024, and 2025.

- The first cancellation came in 2006 with no reason given at the time.
- Cancelled again in 2012, a Blizzard community manager claimed that Blizzard was working on "releasing multiple titles that year and so felt they may not have anything big, new or cool to talk about". World of Warcraft's fourth expansion, Mists of Pandaria, and Diablo III both launched in 2012 while StarCraft II: Heart of the Swarm launched in March 2013.
- The event was cancelled in 2020 due to the COVID-19 pandemic. A virtual event called BlizzConline was held in February 2021, in lieu of an in-person event.
- BlizzCon 2022 was to be held in a modified format with virtual programming and "smaller, in-person gatherings". It was again cancelled in October 2021 in order to prioritize "supporting our teams and progressing development of our games and experiences", and to provide time to "reinvent" the event to be "safe, welcoming, and inclusive as possible". This cancellation came amid the California state government's employee discrimination lawsuit against parent company Activision Blizzard.
- BlizzCon 2024 was cancelled in April 2024, with no reason given.
- BlizzCon 2025 was similarly cancelled in March 2025 with no explicit reason, but in the announcement, Blizzard stated its 2026 BlizzCon plans.

== BlizzCon events ==
Year	Dates	Number of attendees (approx.)	Closing Ceremonies	Ticket Price (USD)	Portal Pass Price (USD)	Virtual Ticket Price (USD)
2005	October 28–29	4,000	The Offspring, Christian Finnegan, L60ETC	100	N/A	N/A
2006	Not held					
2007	August 3–4	13,000	Video Games Live, Jay Mohr, L70ETC	100	N/A	N/A
2008	October 10–11	15,000	Video Games Live, Patton Oswalt, Kyle Kinane, L70ETC	100	N/A	N/A
2009	August 21–22	20,000	Ozzy Osbourne	125	N/A	39.95
2010	October 22–23	27,000	Tenacious D, Dave Grohl	150	N/A	39.99
2011	October 21–22	26,000	Foo Fighters, TAFKL80ETC/L90ETC	175	N/A	39.99
2012	Not held					
2013	November 8–9	26,000	Blink-182	175	N/A	39.99
2014	November 7–8	26,000	Metallica, L90ETC/Elite Tauren Chieftains	199	N/A	39.99
2015	November 6–7	25,000	Linkin Park	199	N/A	39.99
2016	November 4–5	27,000+	"Weird Al" Yankovic	199	N/A	39.99
2017	November 3–4	35,000+	Muse	199	N/A	39.99
2018	November 2–3	40,000+	Train, Lindsey Stirling, Kristian Nairn	199	N/A	49.99
2019	November 1–2		Fitz and the Tantrums, The Glitch Mob, Haywyre	229	550	49.99
2020	Not held					
2021	February 19–20	Online Only	Kristian Nairn, Metallica, Mamamoo	Free	N/A	19.99/39.99/59.99 Celebration Collection
2022	Not held					
2023	November 3–4	TBA	LE SSERAFIM	299	799	Free Live Stream (29.99/49.99 BlizzCon Collection Packs)
2024	Not held					
2025	Not held					
2026	September 12–13	TBA	LE SSERAFIM	289	N/A	Free Live Stream (24.99-49.99 BlizzCon Collection Bundles)

=== 2000s ===
==== 2005 ====
Attendees were able to try one of the two new playable races, the Blood Elves, for upcoming expansion based in Outland which was released as World of Warcraft: The Burning Crusade in 2007. Playable demos of the single and multiplayer modes of the since canceled Starcraft: Ghost were available. A songwriting competition was judged by Jonathan Davis of Korn.

Level 60 Elite Tauren Chieftain, comedian Christian Finnegan, and The Offspring performed at the closing concert.

==== 2007 ====
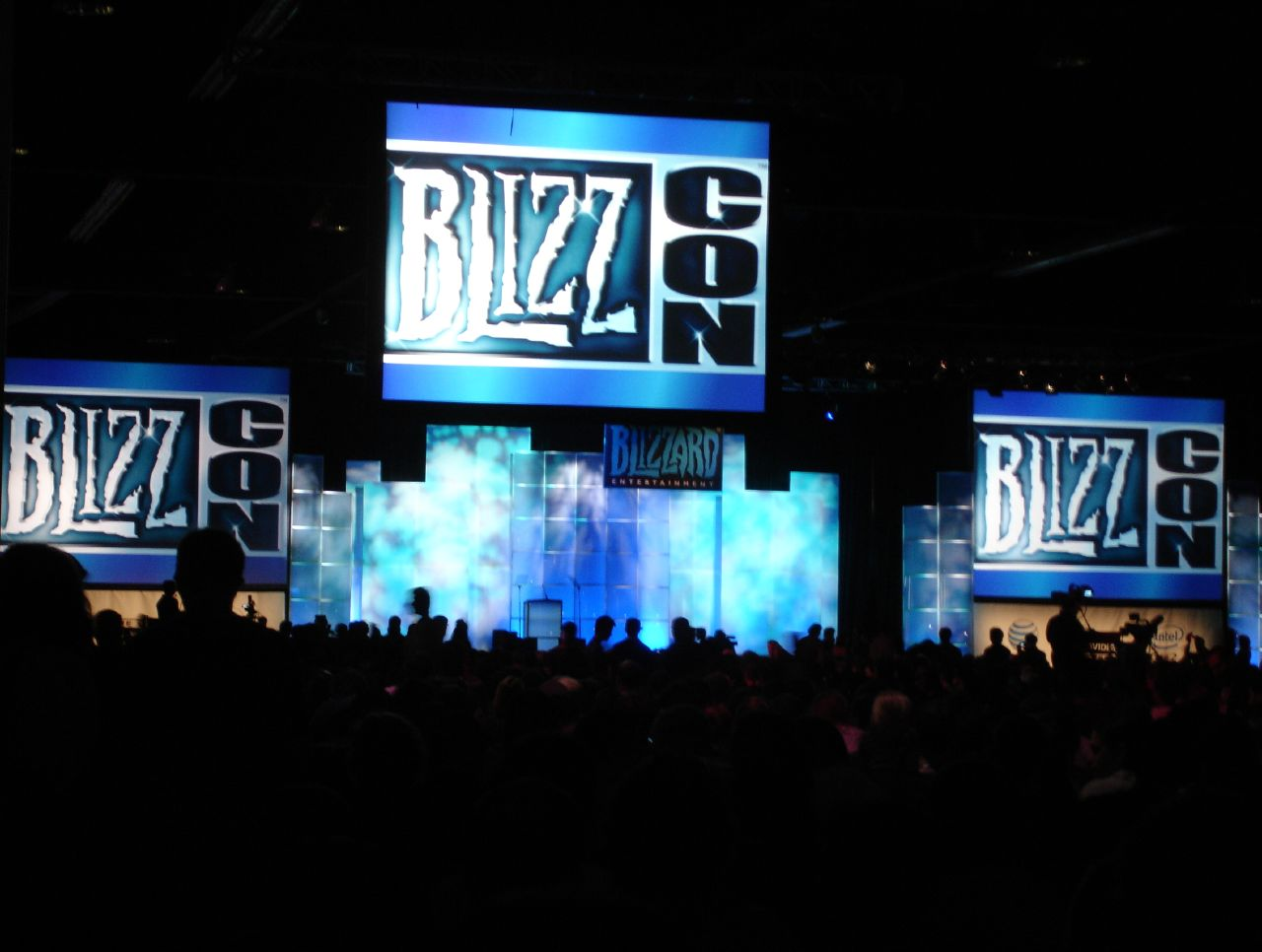
The opening ceremony at the 2007 BlizzCon

A pre-release version of StarCraft II was available for play (the game would be released as StarCraft II: Wings of Liberty only in 2010), as single player or 2v2 as Terran or Protoss. Much of the game, excluding the Zerg race, was revealed and explained as well as Q&A with attendees. The second expansion to World of Warcraft, titled Wrath of the Lich King, was officially announced and available to play.

Comedian Jay Mohr entertained at the closing ceremony followed by Level 70 Elite Tauren Chieftain (who changed their name to reflect the new level cap in The Burning Crusade) alongside Video Games Live performing at the closing concert.

==== 2008 ====
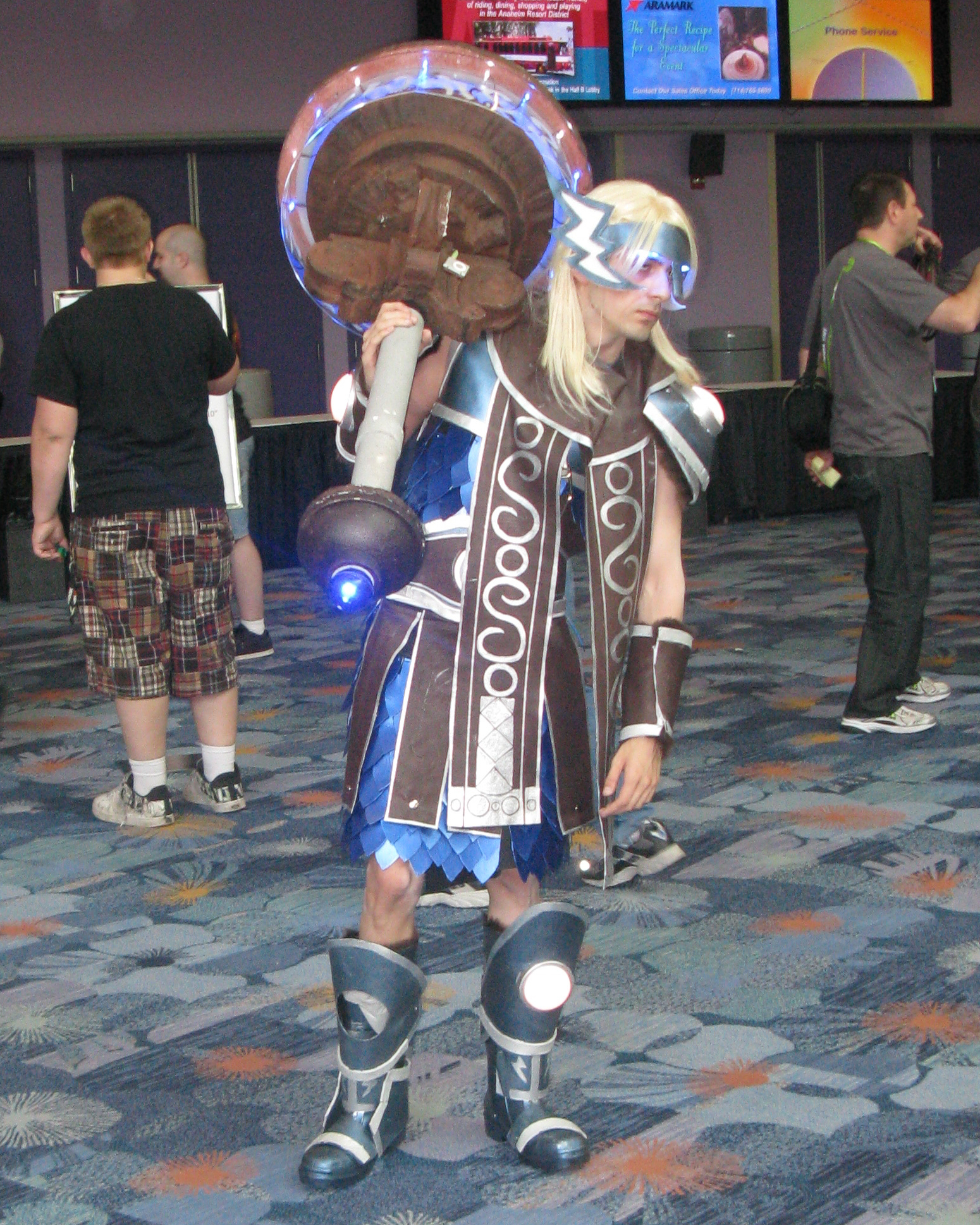
Fan in Thorim costume

In the opening ceremonies, Blizzard president Michael Morhaime revealed the third playable class for Diablo III, the Wizard, as well as the major announcement that Starcraft II would be separated into three games.

Playable versions of Diablo III, StarCraft II, and World of Warcraft: Wrath of the Lich King were available to test during the convention. There were also tournaments and competitions for the World of Warcraft trading card game, World of Warcraft miniatures game, StarCraft, StarCraft II, Warcraft III: The Frozen Throne, and World of Warcraft arena. For the first time, the Zerg race was playable in the StarCraft II demos.

BlizzCon 2008 was broadcast live on both days as a pay-per-view event on DirecTV for US viewers only, offering eight hours of content per day in high definition. Blizzard fansite WoW Radio broadcast live audio via SHOUTcast.

For the closing ceremonies on Saturday, comedians Kyle Kinane and Patton Oswalt performed. The closing concert was performed by Video Games Live, playing arrangements from all of the Blizzard games, including music from Wrath of the Lich King.

==== 2009 ====
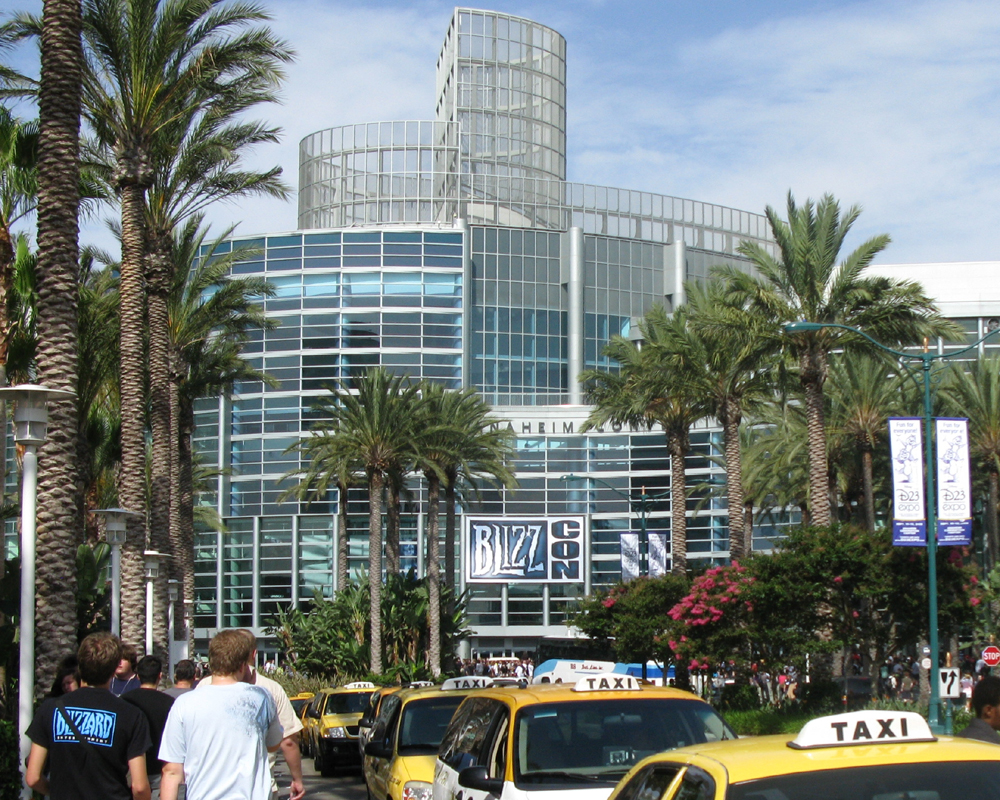
BlizzCon 2009 at the Anaheim Convention Center

To reduce frustrations over low ticket availability for previous BlizzCons, the convention added a fourth hall and a new system for ticket purchasing that used an online queue. DirecTV again carried both days of BlizzCon 2009 as a pay-per-view event ($39.95 for both days) for eight hours per day in both standard and high definition; purchasers also received an exclusive "Grunty the Murloc Marine" World of Warcraft in-game pet. New in 2019, BlizzCon was broadcast live via an internet stream with access offered as a "Virtual Ticket" and included for pay-per-view customers. The site covered both days of the convention featuring exclusive interviews and commentary, main stage presentations including the opening ceremony, and tournament coverage with team highlights.

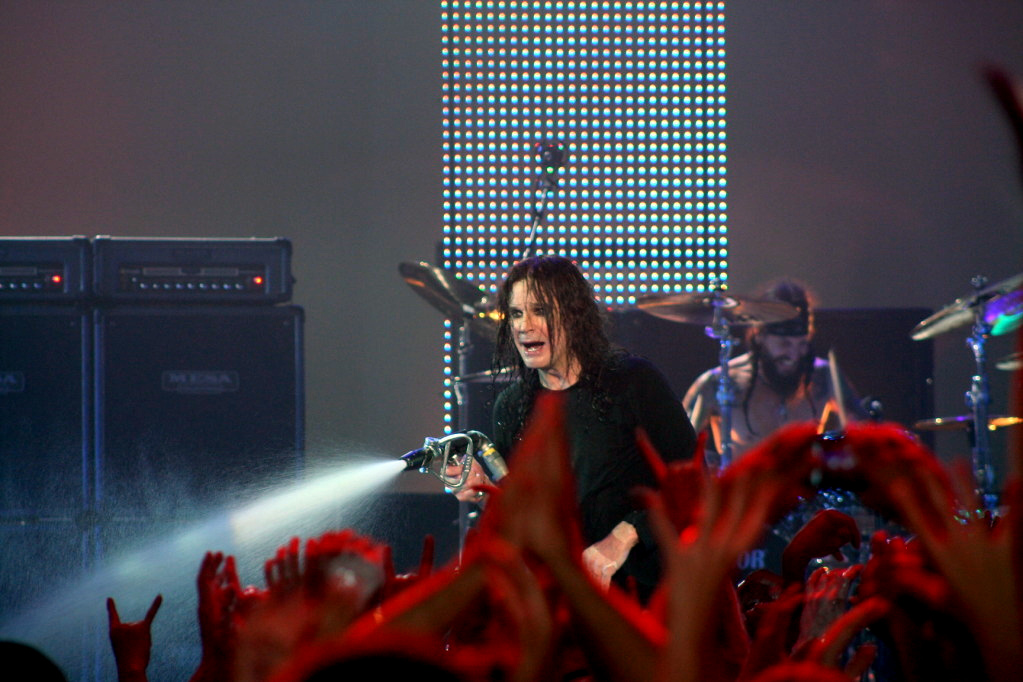
Ozzy Osbourne at BlizzCon 2009

The third expansion, World of Warcraft: Cataclysm was announced. Diablo III, StarCraft II: Wings of Liberty were available to play. Ozzy Osbourne performed for the closing concert.

=== 2010s ===
==== 2010 ====
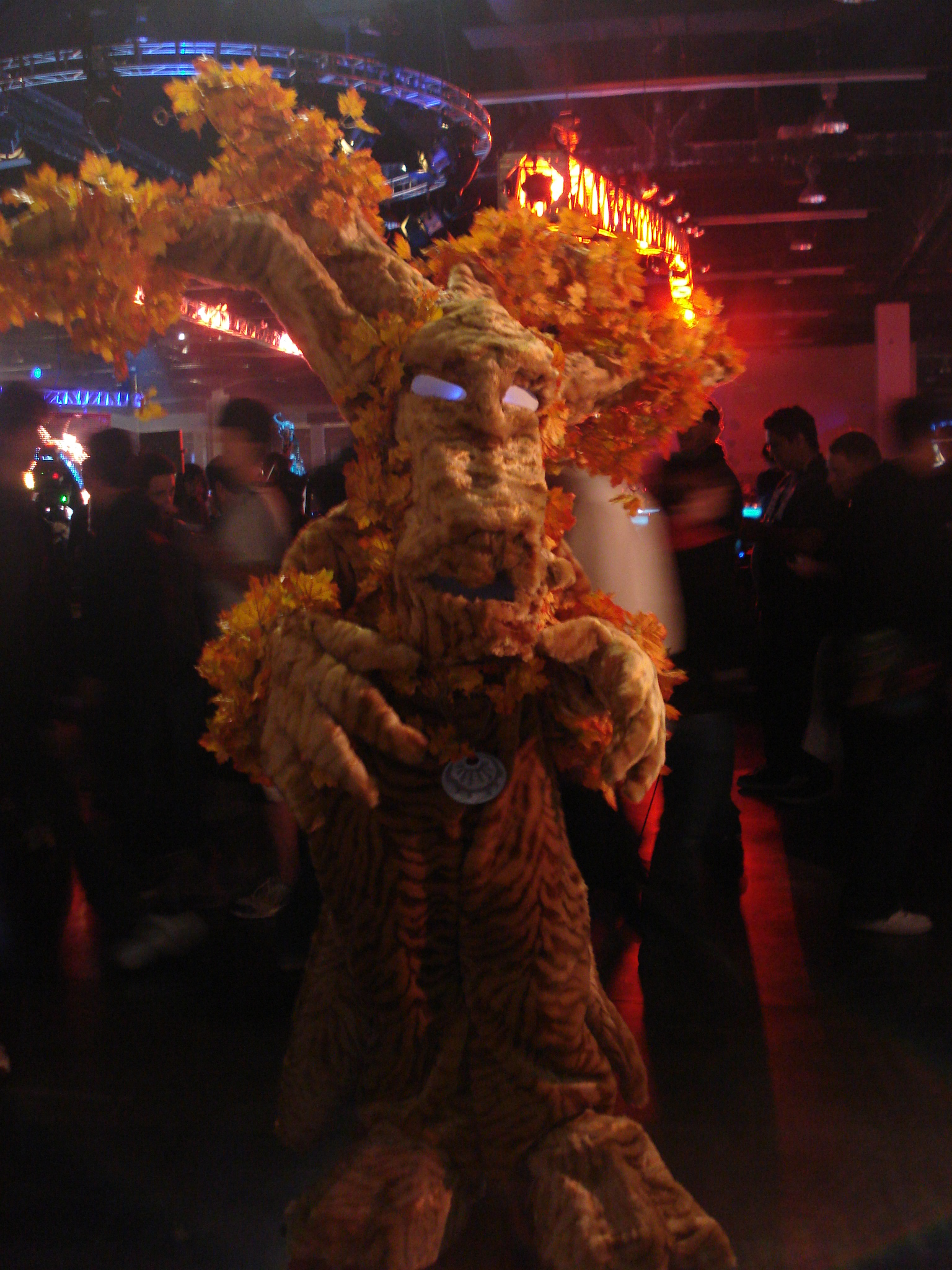
Resto Druid in Tree Form at BlizzCon 2010

The fifth playable Diablo III class was revealed to be the Demon Hunter and the StarCraft II modification called "Blizzard DotA" was presented, which later evolved into Heroes of the Storm. Diablo III, StarCraft II: Wings of Liberty and World of Warcraft: Cataclysm were playable.

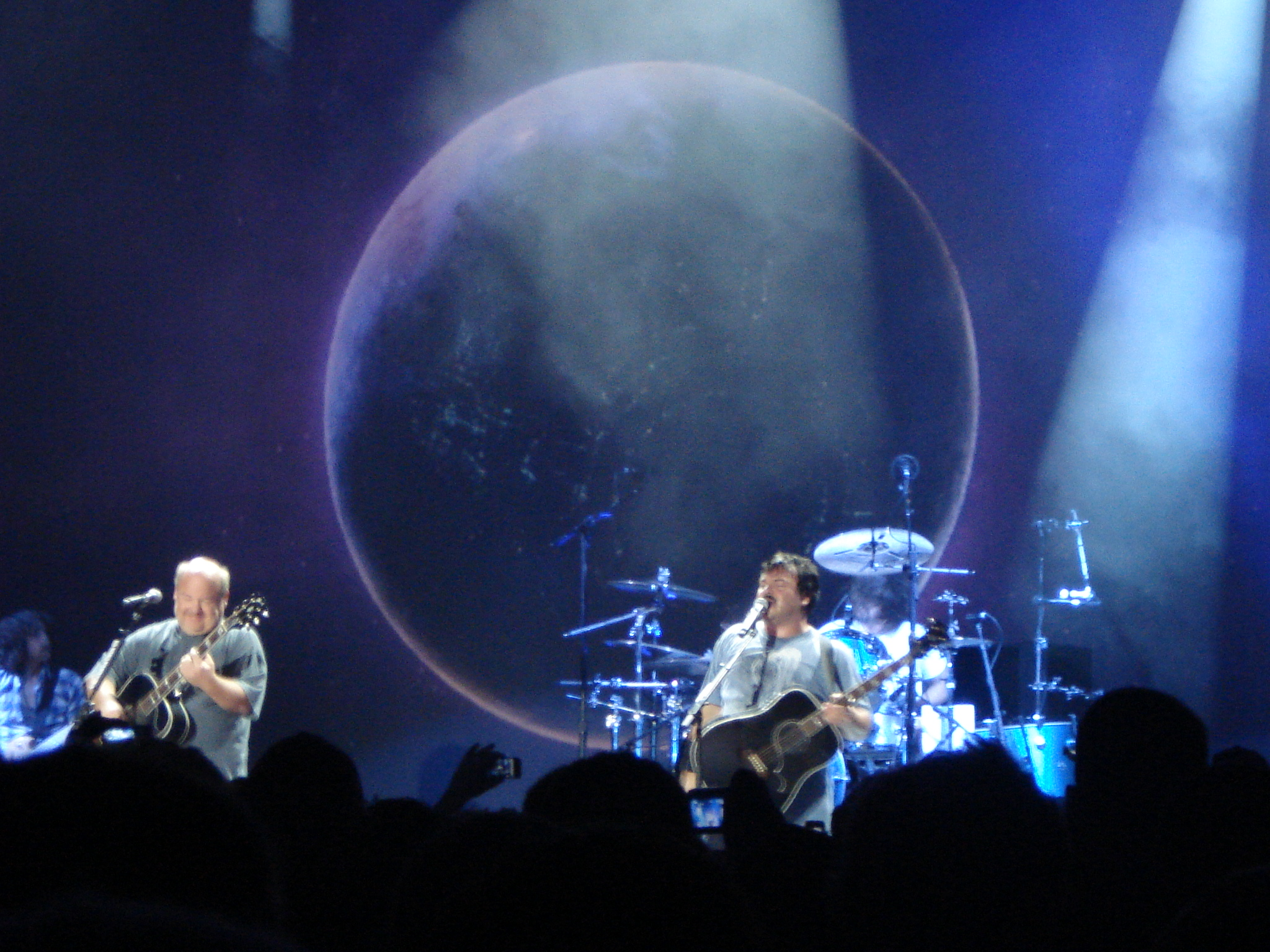
Tenacious D at BlizzCon 2010

Similar to 2009, BlizzCon 2010 was available live via an online broadcast on the "BlizzCon Virtual Ticket". The Virtual Ticket provided four live feeds from the convention floor, offering 50+ hours of BlizzCon programming. DirecTV again offered both days of BlizzCon 2010 as a pay-per-view event (US$39.95 for both days) for ten hours per day in both standard and high definition.

Korean player MVP_Genius won the StarCraft II BlizzCon Invitational. The vinyl record Revolution Overdrive: Songs of Liberty was released for the event. The comedy rock duo Tenacious D played the closing concert with Dave Grohl. Recordings of the event were released for free as part of the Live Music Archive.

==== 2011 ====
The opening ceremony showcased a new Diablo III cinematic trailer titled "The Black Soulstone," a StarCraft II: Heart of the Swarm reveal trailer showed new units and abilities, a "Blizzard DOTA" trailer for a new game made from StarCraft II, and the reveal of World of Warcraft: Mists of Pandaria, a new expansion for World of Warcraft. Diablo III, StarCraft II: Heart of the Swarm, and World of Warcraft: Mists of Pandaria were playable. DirecTV once again offered both days of BlizzCon 2011 as a pay-per-view event.

The GOMTV Global Starcraft II League October final match took place in Anaheim alongside BlizzCon. Moon "MMA" Sung Won beat Jeong "Mvp" Jong Hyeon, 4–1. The closing concert featured a performance from Blizzard's in-house band, The Artist Formerly Known as Level 80 Elite Tauren Chieftains (TAFKL80ETC), who changed their name mid-concert to Level 90 Elite Tauren Chieftains (L90ETC). The Foo Fighters headlined the closing concert.

==== 2013 ====
BlizzCon 2013 was held on November 8 and 9 in Anaheim. The tickets were sold in two batches across April 24 and 27, 2013, and both batches quickly sold out. Blizzard also sold special tickets that included access to a Benefit Dinner. Blizzard once again sold a Virtual Ticket for live streaming of all BlizzCon 2013 events.

The Heroes of the Storm "Cinematic Trailer" was presented with an alpha version of the game available for play. Hearthstone was announced for release to iOS and Android with public beta testing. The fifth expansion to World of Warcraft, Warlords of Draenor, was officially announced with a trailer. The Warcraft film concept art was shown. Diablo III: Reaper of Souls was announced to be released on PC, Xbox One, and PS4.

The gaming events included the finals of the 2013 StarCraft II World Championship Series as well as the Hearthstone Innkeeper's Invitational, a Hearthstone tournament featuring prominent Twitch streamers. The StarCraft II competition was won by Kim "sOs" Yoo-jin, World of Warcraft arena was won by the team Skill-Capped, and Hearthstone was won by Dan "Artosis" Stemkoski. The closing concert was performed by Blink-182.

==== 2014 ====
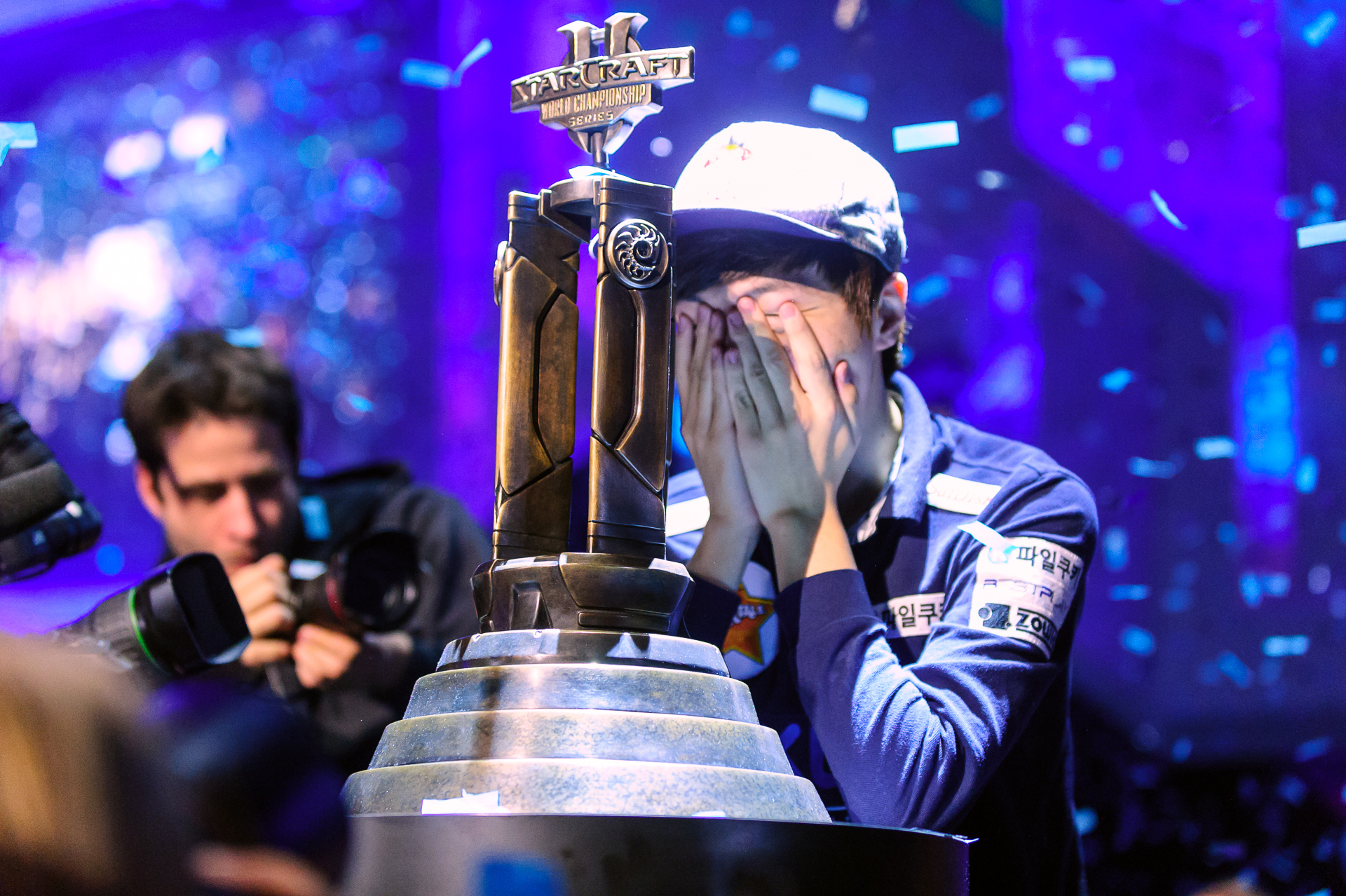
Life won the BlizzCon 2014 StarCraft II tournament.

The tickets were sold in two baches across May 7 and 10, 2014, using Eventbrite instead of the Blizzard Store. Blizzard once again sold a Virtual Ticket for live online streaming of all of the events.

Overwatch, a new class-based multi-player shooter, was announced on November 7, 2014. The third part of Starcraft II, Legacy of the Void was announced. The first expansion pack for Hearthstone, Goblins vs. Gnomes, was announced on the same day.

The first Hearthstone World Championship was hosted at the event, won by James "Firebat" Kostesich. The 2014 StarCraft II World Championship Series Global Finals was won by Lee "Life" Seung Hyun, who beat Mun "MMA" Seong Won. The World of Warcraft championship was won by team Bleached Bones. The first official Heroes of the Storm tournament was held at the event and won by team Cloud9. The closing ceremony concert was opened by Level 90 Elite Tauren Chieftains (changed their name during the show to Elite Tauren Chieftains) and closed by Metallica.

==== 2015 ====
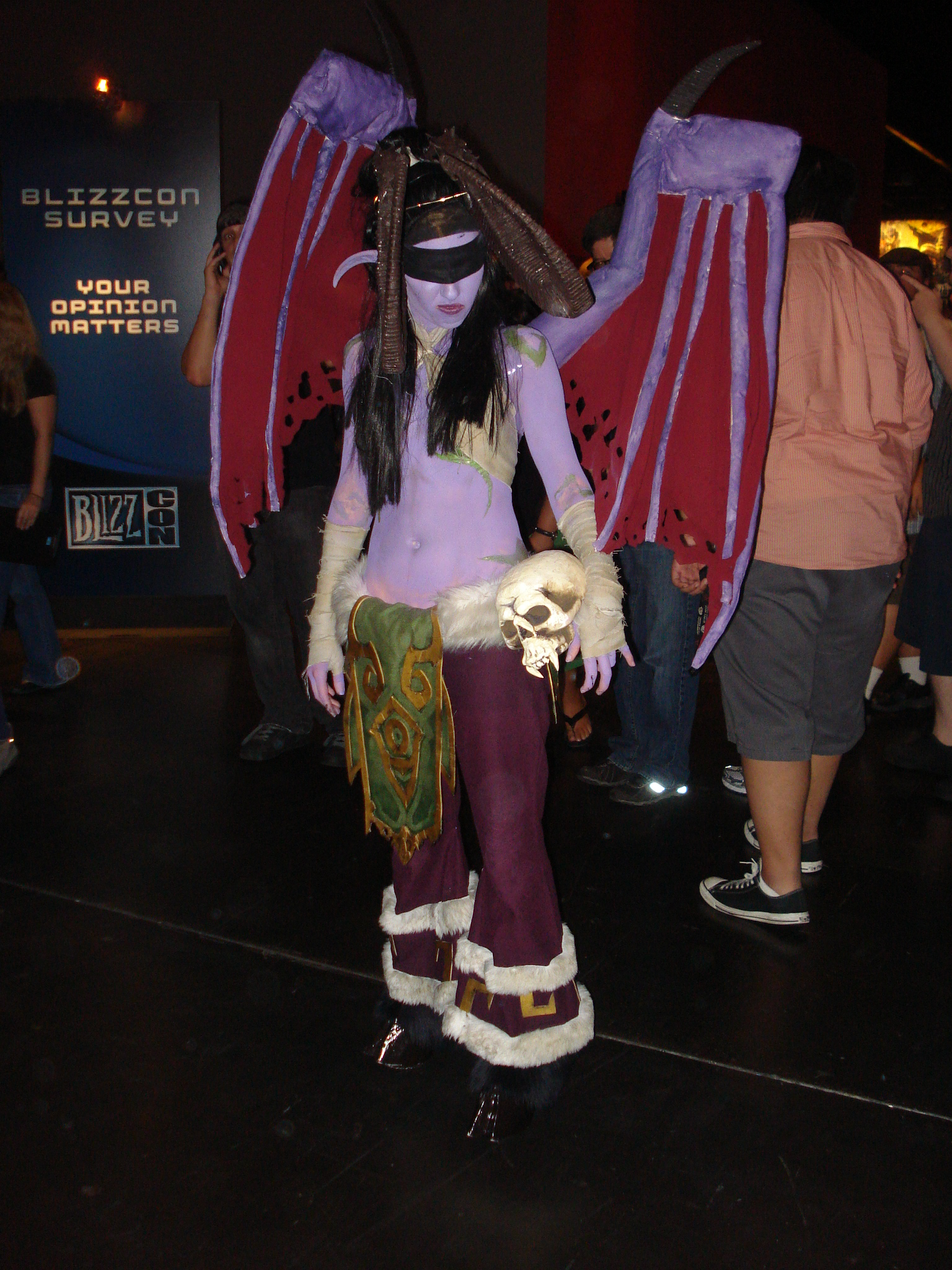
Fan in Illidan costume

The tickets went on sale on April 15 and 18 using Eventbrite and sold out near instantly. Blizzard once again sold a Virtual Ticket for live streaming of all BlizzCon events. The convention's online broadcast was watched by over 10 million people.

Hearthstone's third adventure, League of Explorers, was announced on November 6, 2015 and released on November 12. Overwatch was announced to have a Q2 2016 release date, later confirmed for May 24. The expansion World of Warcraft: Legion released its cinematic trailer confirming a release by September 21, 2016. The Warcraft film had its first official trailer announcing a June 10, 2016, release date. StarCraft II: Nova Covert Ops was announced as a set of three single-player mission packs.

The 2015 Heroes of the Storm World Championship and the second Hearthstone World Championship were hosted at the event. Hearthstone was won by Sebastian "Ostkaka" Engwall and Heroes of the Storm was won by team Cloud 9 again. The 2015 StarCraft II World Championship Series Global Finals was won by Kim "sOs" Yoo-jin beating reining winner Lee "Life" Seung Hyun, making him the first two-time StarCraft II world champion. The World of Warcraft arena team championship was won by SK Gaming. The closing concert was performed by Linkin Park.

==== 2016 ====
BlizzCon 2016, also known as BlizzCon X, was the tenth BlizzCon event. Its tickets were sold on April 20 and 23 using the ticketing service Universe. This year's Virtual Ticket included live streams of the conventions esports events and major panels, along with access to purchase the goody bag of promotional merchandise previously reserved for in-person attendees. While retaining its $39.99 price, the Virtual Ticket no longer included panels and interviews in smaller rooms. In September 2016, Blizzard Entertainment released a sneak peek at the BlizzCon 2016 in-game item rewards.

The gaming announcements included the fourth expansion for Hearthstone, titled Mean Streets of Gadgetzan, which released in December 2016. Overwatch announced Sombra as a new playable character after teasing her via an alternate reality game and the Overwatch League for esports. Diablo III announced an annual The Darkening of Tristram event, in Diablo I would be replayable through the game each January. Additionally, the necromancer class would be added to Diablo III in a DLC pack called Rise of the Necromancer.

The gaming events at BlizzCon 2016 included the StarCraft II World Championship Series Global Finals (won by Byun "ByuN" Hyun Woo), the World of Warcraft arena championship, the Hearthstone third world championship, the Heroes of the Storm fall championship, and the Overwatch World Cup. Kristian Nairn was the disc jockey during Blizzard's 25th anniversary party. The closing ceremony concert was performed by "Weird Al" Yankovic.

==== 2017 ====
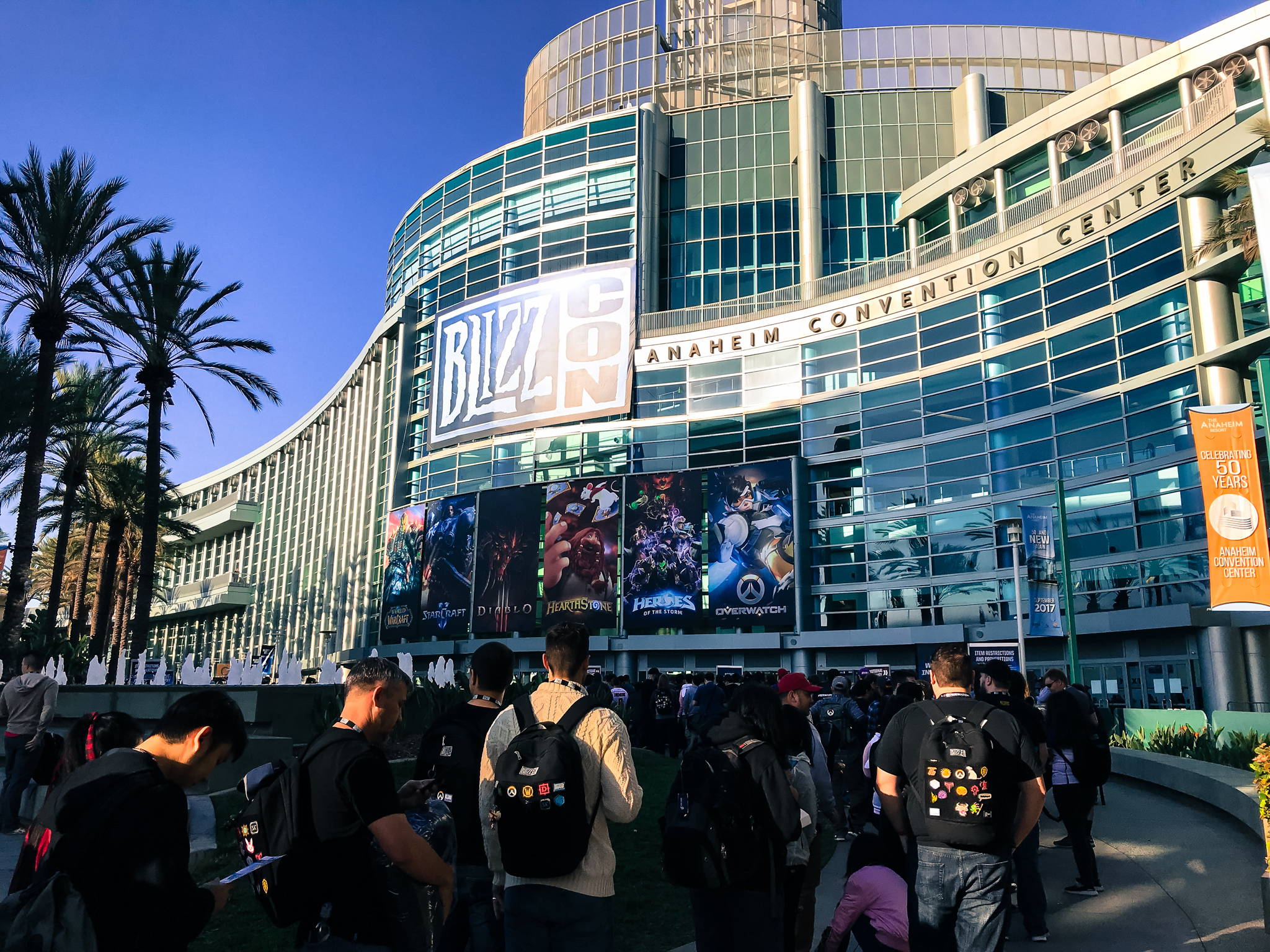
Outside of the Anaheim Convention Center for BlizzCon 2017

On March 14, Blizzard Entertainment announced that BlizzCon 2017 would be held on November 3 and 4, with tickets available for purchase on April 5 and 8 using the ticketing service Universe. A third round of tickets were sold on July 5 due to the convention center adding a new hall. On September 13, 2017, Virtual Tickets were opened for sale; this ticket included a faction-specific flying mount in World of Warcraft, and other special items in the various Blizzard games. BlizzCon 2017 had more than 35,000 attendees, made possible by a recent expansion of the Anaheim Convention Center.

The gaming announcements included the next expansion to World of Warcraft, Battle for Azeroth, opening of official World of Warcraft Classic servers, a new hero (Moira) and map (Blizzard World) for Overwatch, free re-releases ofStarCraft II: Wings of Liberty's first campaign, multiplayer other modes of the game, and the December 2017 release of the next Hearthstone expansion, Kobolds and Catacombs.

The esports events at BlizzCon 2017 included the StarCraft II World Championship Series Global Finals won by Lee "Rogue" Byung Ryul, the World of Warcraft arena championship won by ABC, the Hearthstone Innkeeper's Invitational won by the Grimestreet Grifters, the Heroes of the Storm HGC Finals won by MVP Black, the Overwatch World Cup won by South Korea for the second time, and StarCraft: Remastered Ultimate Title Fight won by Bisu. The closing concert was performed by Muse.

==== 2018 ====
Blizzard Entertainment announced that BlizzCon 2018 would be held on November 2 and 3 at the Anaheim Convention Center, with tickets again sold using Universe on May 9 and 12. A third round of tickets went on sale on August 18.

The announcements on the first day included Warcraft III: Reforged, a remaster of Warcraft III: Reign of Chaos and its expansion, The Frozen Throne; a new Western-themed hero for Overwatch named Ashe; the first original character for Heroes of the Storm, Orphea, who was gifted to attendees and Virtual Ticket holders; the Rastakhan's Rumble expansion for Hearthstone; a playable demo for World of Warcraft Classic; and Diablo: Immortal, an action role-playing game for mobile devices. The announcement of Diablo: Immortal was poorly received, resulting in a high number of dislikes on the YouTube gameplay and cinematic trailers, and considerable criticism from gaming journalists and streamers.

The esports events at BlizzCon 2018 included the StarCraft II World Championship Series Global Finals won by Joona "Serral" Sotala, the World of Warcraft Arena World Championship won by Method Orange, the World of Warcraft Mythic Dungeon Invitational All-Stars won by Free Marsy, the Hearthstone Global Games won by the China team, the Heroes of the Storm Global Championship won by Gen.G, and the Overwatch World Cup won by South Korea for a third consecutive time. Closing festivities included simultaneous concerts by Train, Kristian Nairn, and Lindsey Stirling.

==== 2019 ====
Blizzard Entertainment announced that BlizzCon 2019 would be held on November 1 and 2 at the Anaheim Convention Center, with tickets sold using AXS.com on May 4 and 8. In lieu of the traditional "goodie bag," convention attendees chose between an orc grunt or human footman statue to commemorate 25 years of Warcraft.

Announcements for upcoming releases included Diablo IV, Overwatch 2, World of Warcraft's eighth expansion, Shadowlands, and the Hearthstone expansion Descent of Dragons. Additionally, Hearthstone would be receiving a new game mode called Battlegrounds in December 2019.

The esports events at BlizzCon 2019 included the Overwatch World Cup that was won by the United States, StarCraft II WCS Global Finals won by Park "Dark" Ryung Woo, World of Warcraft Arena World Championship won by Method Black, World of Warcraft Mythic Dungeon International won by Method EU, and Hearthstone Grandmasters Global Finals won by VKLiooon, the first female to win Grandmasters in that game. Closing festivities included simultaneous concerts by The Glitch Mob, Haywyre, and Fitz and the Tantrums (the last concert was viewable for attendees only).

=== 2020s ===
==== 2020 ====
In April 2020, Blizzard announced that they were still working on plans for the next BlizzCon, noting that it may occur in some other form or be cancelled entirely due to the COVID-19 pandemic. In May 2020, Blizzard confirmed they will not hold the physical event, but was considering some online replacement which would not likely occur until early 2021.

==== 2021 ====
On September 21, 2020, Blizzard announced that the virtual event BlizzConline would be held from February 19–20, 2021. It featured the unveiling of Diablo II: Resurrected and the remastered version of The Burning Crusade expansion for World of Warcraft Classic, as well as further details on Overwatch 2 and Diablo Immortal.

In May 2021, Blizzard announced that the in-person BlizzCon event was again cancelled due to COVID-19, as the "ongoing complexities and uncertainties of the pandemic" made it impossible to organize an event at the required scale for its traditional November scheduling. Blizzard stated that there were plans for a "global event" with online components and "smaller in-person gatherings" to be held in early 2022.

==== 2022 ====
On October 26, 2021, amid, but without mentioning, ongoing litigation against the company over its workplace culture and treatment of female employees, Blizzard announced that the previously announced "global event" had been "paused", and that it would "take the time to reimagine what a BlizzCon event of the future could look like."

==== 2023 ====
In May 2023, Blizzard announced that BlizzCon will be held on November 3 and 4 at the Anaheim Convention Center. On June 29, 2023, Blizzard announced several new changes to BlizzCon but did confirm that tickets would be sold once more thru AXS.com in two waves across July 8 and 22. Attendees were restricted to purchasing two tickets per transaction, down from four tickets per transaction in 2019. For the first time in the event's history, tickets for BlizzCon failed to sell out.

Additionally, Blizzard included a Mature warning for BlizzCon content that would not permit children under the age of 7 and required an adult for those aged 7–17 to enter. Blizzard further announced that BlizzCon 2023 would be live streamed for free. However, the Virtual Ticket was still sold by offering in-game items for various Blizzard games. Seating for the opening ceremony was assigned with a lottery due to the smaller capacity of the BlizzCon Arena. In addition, all panels and Community Night events were held BlizzCon Arena using first-come, first-served seating. Events in the BlizzCon Arena were simulcast to screens across BlizzCon. Hall E of the Anaheim Convention Center was not used; the BlizzCon Store, merchandise pick-up, and costume contest typically held there was moved to the bottom half of the North Hall.

== Blizzard WorldWide Invitational ==
Blizzard WorldWide Invitationals were events similar to BlizzCon held outside the United States.

Edition	Dates	Location	Price	Game announce	Beta key	Playable games	Web sites
1	January 15 to 18, 2004	Seoul, South Korea, COEX Convention Center	Free	None	?	?	?
2	February 3 to 5, 2006	Seoul, South Korea, COEX Convention Center	?	None	?	?	WWI 2006
3	May 19 and 20, 2007	Seoul, South Korea	Free	StarCraft II	None	None	WWI 2007
4	June 28 and 29, 2008	Paris, France, Porte de Versailles	70 euros	Diablo III	WoW Wrath Lich King	StarCraft II, WoW Wrath Lich King	WWI 2008
