= Global StarCraft II League =

StarCraft II esports tournament

Global StarCraft II League (GSL)
- Sport: eSports (StarCraft II)
- Founded: September 2010
- CEO: Jung Chan Yong
- Country: South Korea
- Most recent champion: Park "Dark" Ryung Woo
- Most titles: Cho "Maru" Seong Ju (8 titles)
- Website: https://www.sooplive.com/station/gslenglish

Global StarCraft II League (GSL) is a StarCraft II tournament held in South Korea from 2010 to the present. It has been hosted by Soop (formerly known as afreecaTV) since 2016; GOMeXp (formerly GOMTV) hosted it from 2010–2015. Blizzard Entertainment was involved in co-producing and co-funding it for much of its history, although their involvement was greatly reduced in the 2020s. For the first two years of the tournament, it featured two leagues, Code S (major) and Code A (minor); afterward it ran as a single combined tournament.

An English language stream is available, aimed at a global audience. The English cast was mainly performed by Dan "Artosis" Stemkoski and Nicolas "Tasteless" Plott until 2022; in 2023, it switched to Tasteless and Ryan "State" Visbeck. Early broadcasts were done on GOMTV's website and player; it switched to Twitch and Afreeca's own platform after Afreeca took over; and the program now broadcasts on Mondays and Thursdays, with the English casts on YouTube, since 2020.

== History ==
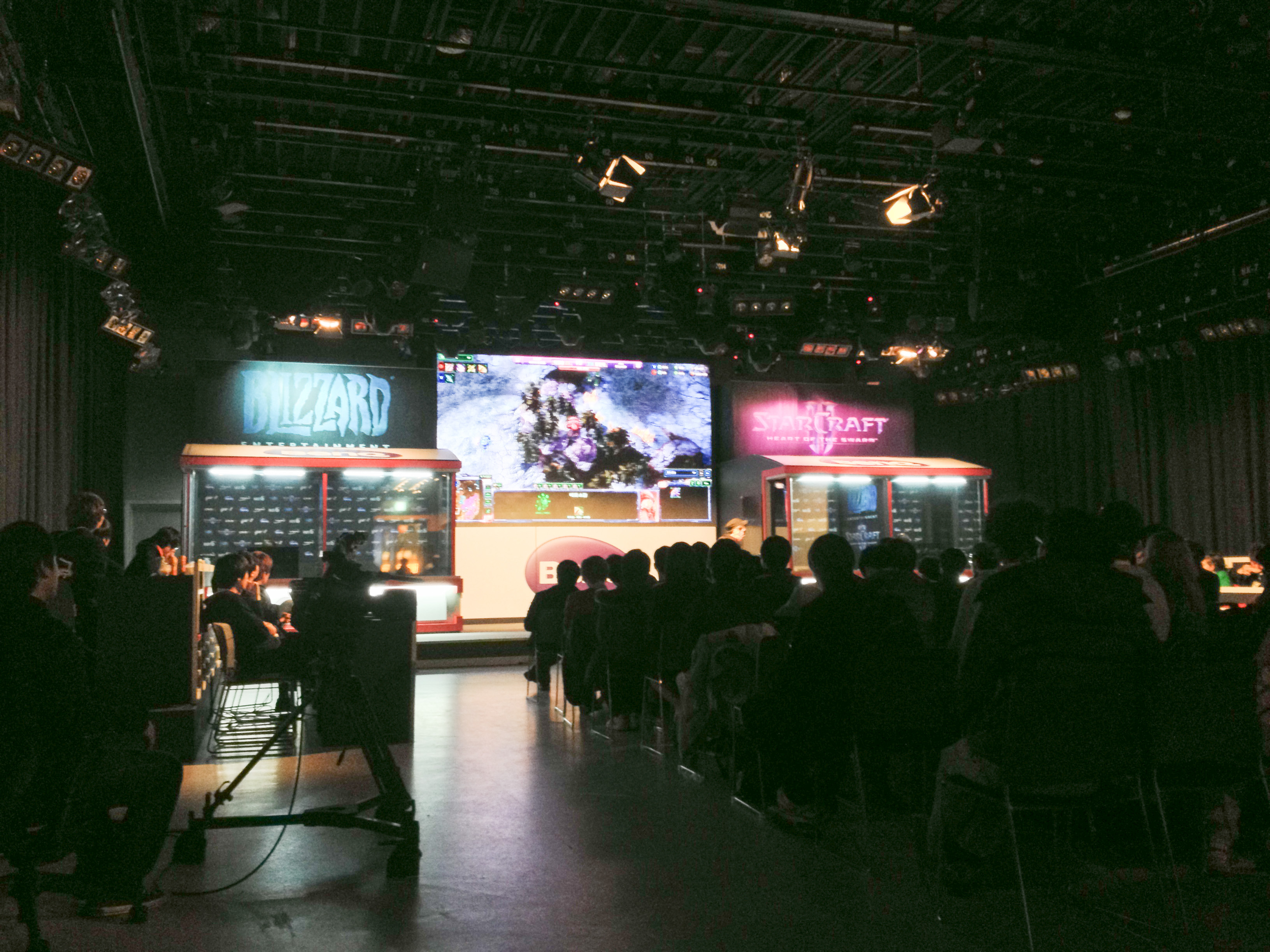
GOMtv Studio in Gangnam

The 2010 Open Seasons were the first tournaments for the GSL, featuring three initial events with an overall prize pool of 600 million Korean Won (approximately US$500,000) and a prize of 100 million Won for the winner. These attracted attention as they featured the largest prize pool in the history of e-Sports. The Open Seasons were used to sort the players into Code S and Code A for the 2011 season.

The major tournaments of the early era were divided into Code S and Code A. Code S is the major league and consists of 32 top players in Korea, with the winner of Code S crowned GSL champion. Code A is the minor league, also of 32 players. The initial rules were that the winner of the Code A tournament automatically qualifies to Code S. The top seven Code A players and bottom eight Code S players participate in Up & Down Matches in groups of five players. The top two of each group qualified to Code S. Code A qualifiers were also held before the start of a new season. Top ranking players (informally called Code B) on the Korean Battle.net server were allowed to participate, as were invited foreign players.

For the 2011 GSL November season, it was announced that the format would be changing. The new format would be a dual tournament format with double-elimination four-player groups (also known in esports generally as "GSL-style groups"), where losing players in Code S immediately drop to Code A. The new GSL format meant that there would no longer be a Code A champion, but rather victors would proceed into the Code S tournament.

The 2012 tour changed the tournament format slightly, resulting in a longer season. Due to the extended season, there were only 5 GSL tournaments in the year.

In 2013, the GSL and the OnGameNet Starleague (OSL) jointly ran the Korean qualifier league for Blizzard Entertainment's World Championship Series (WCS) under the name "WCS Korea".

OnGameNet stopped its StarCraft II activities in 2014, and the GSL became the only individual league in South Korea. It ran every season of WCS Korea under its own name again (GSL).

In 2015, the GSL and SPOTV's newly established StarCraft II StarLeague (SSL) ran parallel to each other as the focus of professional play in South Korea. Each league had three seasons throughout the year, for a total of six individual league seasons. From 2010 to the end of 2015 GSL Season 2, GOMTV awarded over 3.6 billion Korean won (over $3.1 million USD) from the individual GSL and Arena of Legends leagues in StarCraft II.

The GSL and the SSL continued to run as parallel leagues in South Korea for 2016. Each league had two seasons throughout the year, for a total of four individual league seasons, with the finalists of their first and second seasons playing in the first and second season Cross-Finals events. The first season of GSL for WCS 2016 was preceded by two GSL Pre-Season tournaments which both granted seeding into the main competition to their respective winners.

Some years, the organizers have run Super Tournaments as side events. The 2010 Super Tournament was a 64-man tournament featuring a prize pool of 202 million Korean Won. Participants are determined by the total GSL points obtained throughout the year. Super Tournaments were also run in 2011 and in 2017–2022.

In 2023, it was reported that the GSL will continue, but with a reduced presence: the first tournament in 2023 played the preliminary matches online, presumably due to Blizzard no longer funding the prize pools. They reversed the decision to move early round matches online after the conclusion of the first season, and restored the event to the studio for the later 2023 seasons.

== Casters ==
The English-language broadcast was performed for years by Dan "Artosis" Stemkoski and Nick "Tasteless" Plott, a combination known as "Tastosis." The pair were considered a major draw of the tournament and helped establish a new standard in esports commentary in the English-language market, with the pair praised as "fan favorites" and their work praised as iconic to the medium. Artosis departed from South Korea to move to Canada in 2022, with his last cast being of the 2022 GSL S3 Final in October 2022. From 2023 to the present, the cast is done by Tasteless and Ryan "State" Visbeck.

== Champions ==
=== Code S and other Major Tournaments ===
This is a list of all major GSL tournaments. The winner of a tournament is called a GSL champion.

Regular Season	World Championship	Super Tournament	Blizzard/HOT6 Cup	Open Season

Year	Name of Tournament	Winner	Result of Final	Runner-up
2010	TG-Intel STARCRAFT II Open Season1	Kim "Fruitdealer" Won Gi (TSL) (Zerg)	4 - 1	Kim "Rainbow" Sung Je (ST) (Terran)
2010	Sony Ericsson STARCRAFT II Open Season2	Lim "NesTea" Jae Duk (IM) (Zerg)	4 - 3	Lee "MarineKing" Jung Hoon (Prime) (Terran)
2010	Sony Ericsson STARCRAFT II Open Season3	Jang "MC" Min Chul (oGs) (Protoss)	4 - 1	Park "Rain" Seo Yong (TSL) (Terran)
2011	Sony Ericsson Global StarCraft II League Jan.	Jeong "Mvp" Jong Hyeon (IM) (Terran)	4 - 0	Lee "MarineKing" Jung Hoon (Prime) (Terran)
2011	2nd Gen. Intel Core Global StarCraft II League Mar.	Jang "MC" Min Chul (oGs) (Protoss)	4 - 1	Park "July" Sung Joon (ST) (Zerg)
2011	LG Cinema 3D World Championship Seoul	Jeong "Mvp" Jong Hyeon (IM) (Terran)	4 - 2	Lee "MarineKing" Jung Hoon (Prime) (Terran)
2011	LG Cinema 3D Global StarCraft II League May	Lim "NesTea" Jae Duk (IM) (Zerg)	4 - 0	Song "InCa" Joon Hyuk (oGs) (Protoss)
2011	LG Cinema 3D GSL Super Tournament	Choi "Polt" Sung Hoon (Prime) (Terran)	4 - 0	Moon "MMA" Sung Won (SlayerS) (Terran)
2011	Pepsi Global StarCraft II League July	Lim "NesTea" Jae Duk (IM) (Zerg)	4 - 0	Hwang "LosirA" Kang Ho (IM) (Zerg)
2011	Pepsi Global StarCraft II League August	Jeong "MVP" Jong Hyeon (IM) (Terran)	4 - 1	Kim "TOP" Jung Hoon (oGs) (Terran)
2011	Sony Ericsson Global StarCraft II League Oct.	Moon "MMA" Sung Won (SlayerS) (Terran)	4 - 1	Jeong "Mvp" Jong Hyeon (IM) (Terran)
2011	Sony Ericsson Global StarCraft II League Nov.	Jung "jjakji" Ji Hoon (NSHoSeo) (Terran)	4 - 2	Lee "Leenock" Dong Nyung (FXO) (Zerg)
2011	2011 Blizzard Cup	Moon "MMA" Sung Won (SlayerS) (Terran)	4 - 3	Park "DongRaeGu" Soo Ho (MVP) (Zerg)
2012	2012 Hot6ix Global StarCraft II League Season 1	Park "DongRaeGu" Soo Ho (MVP) (Zerg)	4 - 2	Jung "Genius" Min Soo (MVP) (Protoss)
2012	2012 Hot6ix Global StarCraft II League Season 2	Jeong "MVP" Jong Hyeon (LG-IM) (Terran)	4 - 3	Park "Squirtle" Hyun Woo (StarTale) (Protoss)
2012	2012 Monsieur J Global StarCraft II League Season 3	Ahn "Seed" Sang Won (LG-IM) (Protoss)	4 - 1	Jang "MC" Min Chul (SK Gaming) (Protoss)
2012	2012 Hot6ix Global StarCraft II League Season 4	Lee "Life" Seung Hyun (StarTale) (Zerg)	4 - 3	Jeong "MVP" Jong Hyun (LG-IM) (Terran)
2012	2012 Hot6ix Global StarCraft II League Season 5	Kwon "Sniper" Tae Hoon (MVP) (Zerg)	4 - 3	Ko "Hyun" Seok Hyun (TSL) (Zerg)
2012	2012 Blizzard Cup	Lee "Life" Seung Hyun (StarTale) (Zerg)	4 - 2	Won "PartinG" Lee Sak (StarTale) (Protoss)
2013	2013 Hot6ix Global StarCraft II League Season 1	Shin "RorO" No Yeol (Samsung KHAN) (Zerg)	4 - 2	Kang "Symbol" Dong Hyun (AZUBU) (Zerg)
2013	2013 WCS Korea Season 1 MANGOSIX GSL	Kim "Soulkey" Min Chul (WoongJin Stars) (Zerg)	4 - 3	Lee "INnoVation" Shin Hyung (STX SouL) (Terran)
2013	2013 WCS Korea Season 3 JOGUNSHOP GSL	Baek "Dear" Dong Jun (SouL) (Protoss)	4 - 2	Eo "soO" Yoon Su (SK Telecom T1) (Zerg)
2013	2013 HOT6 Cup	Jeong "Rain" Yoon Jong (SKT T1) (Protoss)	4 - 2	Kim "Soulkey" Min Cheol (WoongJin Stars) (Zerg)
2014	2014 HOT6 Global StarCraft II League Season 1	Joo "Zest" Sung Wook (KT Rolster) (Protoss)	4 - 3	Eo "soO" Yoon Su (SKT T1) (Zerg)
2014	2014 HOT6 GSL Global Tournament	Joo "Zest" Sung Wook (KT Rolster) (Protoss)	4 - 3	Won "PartinG" Lee Sak (SKT T1) (Protoss)
2014	2014 HOT6 Global StarCraft II League Season 2	Kim "Classic" Doh Woo (SKT T1) (Protoss)	4 - 2	Eo "soO" Yoon Su (SKT T1) (Zerg)
2014	2014 HOT6 Global StarCraft II League Season 3	Lee "INnoVation" Shin Hyung (SKT T1) (Terran)	4 - 2	Eo "soO" Yoon Su (SKT T1) (Zerg)
2014	2014 HOT6 Cup	Kim "sOs" Yoo Jin (JinAir Greenwings) (Protoss)	4 - 1	Lee "MarineKing" Jeong Hoon (MVP) (Terran)
2015	2015 Global StarCraft II League Season 1	Lee "Life" Seung Hyun (KT Rolster) (Zerg)	4 - 3	Won "PartinG" Lee Sak (yoe Flash Wolves) (Protoss)
2015	2015 SBENU Global StarCraft II League Season 2	Jung "Rain" Yoon Jong (mYinsanity) (Protoss)	4 - 1	Han "ByuL" Ji Won (CJ Entus) (Zerg)
2015	2015 HOT6 Global StarCraft II League Season 3	Lee "INnoVation" Shin Hyung (SKT T1) (Terran)	4 - 2	Han "ByuL" Ji Won (CJ Entus) (Zerg)
2016	2016 HOT6 Global StarCraft II League Season 1	Joo "Zest" Sung Wook (KT Rolster) (Protoss)	4 - 2	Jun "TY" Tae Yang (KT Rolster) (Terran)
2016	2016 HOT6 Global StarCraft II League Season 2	Byun "ByuN" Hyun Woo (Terran)	4 - 1	Kim "sOs" Yoo Jin (JinAir Greenwings) (Protoss)
2017	2017 HOT6 Global StarCraft II League Season 1	Kim "Stats" Dae Yeob (Splyce) (Protoss)	4 - 2	Eo "soO" Yoon Su (Zerg)
2017	2017 HOT6 GSL Super Tournament I	Kim "herO" Joon Ho (ROOT Gaming) (Protoss)	4 - 2	Han "aLive" Lee Seok (mYinsanity) (Terran)
2017	2017 HOT6 Global StarCraft II League Season 2	Koh "GuMiho" Byung Jae (PSISTORM Gaming) (Terran)	4 - 2	Eo "soO" Yoon Su (Zerg)
2017	2017 GSL vs. the World	Lee "INnoVation" Shin Hyung (Terran)	4 - 0	Jun "TY" Tae Yang (Splyce) (Terran)
2017	2017 HOT6 Global StarCraft II League Season 3	Lee "INnoVation" Shin Hyung (Terran)	4 - 3	Kim "sOs" Yoo Jin (Protoss)
2017	2017 HOT6 GSL Super Tournament II	Lee "Rogue" Byung Ryul (Jin Air Green Wings) (Zerg)	4 - 3	Kim "herO" Joon Ho (ROOT Gaming) (Protoss)
2018	2018 Global StarCraft II League Season 1	Cho "Maru" Seong Ju (Jin Air Green Wings) (Terran)	4 - 2	Kim "Stats" Dae Yeob (Splyce) (Protoss)
2018	2018 GSL Super Tournament I	Kim "Stats" Dae Yeob (Splyce) (Protoss)	4 - 3	Park "Dark" Ryung Woo (Zerg)
2018	2018 Global StarCraft II League Season 2	Cho "Maru" Seong Ju (Jin Air Green Wings) (Terran)	4 - 0	Joo "Zest" Sung Wook (Protoss)
2018	2018 GSL vs. the World	Joona "Serral" Sotala (ENCE eSports) (Zerg)	4 - 3	Kim "Stats" Dae Yeob (Splyce) (Protoss)
2018	2018 Global StarCraft II League Season 3	Cho "Maru" Seong Ju (Jin Air Green Wings) (Terran)	4 - 3	Jun "TY" Tae Yang (Splyce) (Terran)
2018	2018 GSL Super Tournament II	Kim "Classic" Doh Woo (The Gosu Crew) (Protoss)	4 - 3	Kim "sOs" Yoo Jin (JinAir Greenwings) (Protoss)
2019	2019 Mountain Dew Global StarCraft II League Season 1	Cho "Maru" Seong Ju (Jin Air Green Wings) (Terran)	4 - 2	Kim "Classic" Doh Woo (Splyce) (Protoss)
2019	2019 GSL Super Tournament I	Kim "Classic" Doh Woo (Protoss)	4 -1	Koh "GuMiho" Byung Jae (PSISTORM Gaming) (Terran)
2019	2019 Global StarCraft II League Season 2	Park "Dark" Ryung Woo (Zerg)	4 - 2	Cho "Trap" Sung-ho (Jin Air Green Wings) (Protoss)
2019	2019 GSL vs. the World	Joona "Serral" Sotala (Zerg)	4 - 2	Mikołaj "Elazer" Ogonowski (Zerg)
2019	2019 Global StarCraft II League Season 3	Lee "Rogue" Byung Ryul (Jin Air Green Wings) (Zerg)	4 - 0	Cho "Trap" Sung-ho (Jin Air Green Wings) (Protoss)
2019	2019 GSL Super Tournament II	Park "Dark" Ryung Woo (Zerg)	4 - 0	Jun "TY" Tae Yang (Splyce) (Terran)
2020	2020 AfreecaTV GSL Super Tournament I	Cho "Maru" Seong Ju (Jin Air Green Wings) (Terran)	4 - 3	Park "Dark" Ryung Woo (Dragon Phoenix Gaming) (Zerg)
2020	2020 Global StarCraft II League Season 1	Jun "TY" Tae Yang (Afreeca Freecs) (Terran)	4 - 0	Kim "Cure" Do Wook (Dragon Phoenix Gaming) (Terran)
2020	2020 Global StarCraft II League Season 2	Lee "Rogue" Byeong Yeol (Jin Air Green Wings) (Zerg)	4 - 1	Kim "Stats" Dae Yeob (Afreeca Freecs) (Protoss)
2020	2020 Global StarCraft II League Season 3	Jun "TY" Tae Yang (Afreeca Freecs) (Terran)	4 - 2	Cho "Maru" Seong Ju (Jin Air Green Wings) (Terran)
2020	2020 AfreecaTV GSL Super Tournament II	Cho "Trap" Sung-ho (Protoss)	4 - 3	Kim "Stats" Dae Yeob (Afreeca Freecs) (Protoss)
2021	2021 AfreecaTV GSL Super Tournament I	Cho "Trap" Sung-ho (Afreeca Freecs) (Protoss)	4 - 2	Park "Zoun" Han-sol (Alpha X) (Protoss)
2021	2021 Global StarCraft II League Season 1	Lee "Rogue" Byeong Yeol (Dragon Phoenix Gaming) (Zerg)	4 - 1	Cho "Maru" Seong Ju (Team NV) (Terran)
2021	2021 AfreecaTV GSL Super Tournament II	Cho "Trap" Sung-ho (Afreeca Freecs) (Protoss)	4 - 2	Park "Zoun" Han-sol (Alpha X) (Protoss)
2021	2021 Global StarCraft II League Season 2	Park "Dark" Ryung Woo (Dragon Phoenix Gaming) (Zerg)	4 - 1	Cho "Trap" Sung-ho (Afreeca Freecs) (Protoss)
2021	2021 Global StarCraft II League Season 3	Kim "Cure" Do Wook (Dragon Phoenix Gaming) (Terran)	4 - 2	Joo "Zest" Sung Wook (Dragon Phoenix Gaming) (Protoss)
2022	2022 AfreecaTV GSL Super Tournament I	Joo "Zest" Sung Wook (Dragon Phoenix Gaming) (Protoss)	4 - 3	Park "Dark" Ryung Woo (Dragon Phoenix Gaming) (Zerg)
2022	2022 Global StarCraft II League Season 1	Lee "Rogue" Byung Ryul (Dragon Phoenix Gaming) (Zerg)	4 - 2	Jang "Creator" Hyun Woo (Team NV) (Protoss)
2022	2022 Global StarCraft II League Season 2	Kim "herO" Joon-ho (Dragon Phoenix Gaming) (Protoss)	4 - 1	Cho "Maru" Seong Ju (ONSYDE Gaming) (Terran)
2022	2022 Global StarCraft II League Season 3	Cho "Maru" Seong Ju (ONSYDE Gaming) (Terran)	4 - 0	Shin "RagnaroK" Hee-Beom (AlphaX) (Zerg)
2022	2022 AfreecaTV GSL Super Tournament II	Kang "Solar" Min-soo (ONSYDE Gaming) (Zerg)	4 - 3	Park "Dark" Ryung Woo (Dragon Phoenix Gaming) (Zerg)
2023	2023 Global StarCraft II League Season 1	Cho "Maru" Seong Ju (ONSYDE Gaming) (Terran)	4 - 2	Kim "Cure" Do Wook (Club NV) (Terran)
2023	2023 Global StarCraft II League Season 2	Cho "Maru" Seong Ju (ONSYDE Gaming) (Terran)	4 - 2	Park "Dark" Ryung Woo (DKZ Gaming) (Zerg)
2023	2023 Global StarCraft II League Season 3	Kang "Solar" Min Soo (ONSYDE Gaming) (Zerg)	4 - 1	Koh "GuMiho" Pyung Jae (Cloud9) (Terran)
2024	2024 Global StarCraft II League Season 1	Cho "Maru" Seong Ju (Team Vitality) (Terran)	4 - 1	Kim "herO" Joon-ho (DKZ Gaming) (Protoss)
2024	2024 Global StarCraft II League Season 2	Park "Dark" Ryung Woo (Talon Esports Gaming) (Zerg)	4 - 2	Cho "Maru" Seong Ju (Team Vitality) (Terran)
2025	2025 Global StarCraft II League Season 1	Kim "herO" Joon-ho (Twisted Minds) (Protoss)	4 - 3	Kim "Cure" Do Wook (Team Liquid) (Terran)
2025	2025 Global StarCraft II League Season 2	Kim "Classic" Doh Woo (Virtus.pro) (Protoss)	4 - 3	Lee "Rogue" Byung Ryul (Team Falcons) (Zerg)
2026	2026 Global StarCraft II League Season 1	Kim "herO" Joon-ho (T1) (Protoss)	4 - 2	Shin "Shin" Hee-Beom (Zerg)
2026	2026 Global StarCraft II League Season 2	Kim "herO" Joon-ho (T1) (Protoss)	4 - 2	Kim "Cure" Do Wook (Team Liquid) (Terran)

- 2011 GSL October took place in Anaheim, California during BlizzCon. This was the first GSL final to take place outside South Korea.
- 2012 Hot6ix GSL Season 5 took place at IPL 5 in Las Vegas, Nevada.

=== Pre-Season Tournaments ===
Preceding the beginning of 2016 HOT6 Global StarCraft II League Season 1, two Pre-Season tournaments were held by AfreecaTV, with the winner of each being seeded into the main event.

Year	Name of Tournament	Winner	Result of Final	Runner-up
2015	2016 Global StarCraft II League Pre-Season Week 1	Kim "herO" Joon Ho (CJ Entus) (Protoss)	3 - 0	Lee "Life" Seung Hyun (KT Rolster) (Zerg)
2015	2016 Global StarCraft II League Pre-Season Week 2	Kim "MyuNgSik" Myung-Sik (TCM Gaming) (Protoss)	3 - 2	Jun "TY" Tae Yang (KT Rolster) (Terran)

=== Code A ===
Separate Code A tournaments were only held in 2011. The format changed in November 2011, where Code A become a direct qualifier into the main Code S tournament rather than a separate tournament.

Year	Name of Tournament	Winner	Result of Final	Runner-up
2011	Sony Ericsson Global StarCraft II League Jan.	Kim "TOP" Jung Hoon (oGs) (Terran)	4 - 3	Byun "Byun" Hyun Woo (ZeNex) (Terran)
2011	2nd Gen. Intel Core Global StarCraft II League Mar.	Hwang "LosirA" Kang Ho (IM) (Zerg)	4 - 3	Kim "SuperNoVa" Young Jin (oGs) (Terran)
2011	LG Cinema 3D Global StarCraft II League May	Choi "Bomber" Ji Sung (ST) (Terran)	4 - 2	Jeong "MVP" Jong Hyeon (IM) (Terran)
2011	Pepsi Global StarCraft II League July	Kim "Puzzle" Sang-Joon (ZeNEX) (Protoss)	4 - 2	Kim "Tassadar" Jung Hoon (NSHoSeo) (Protoss)
2011	Pepsi Global StarCraft II League August	Kim "GanZi" Dong Ju (SlayerS) (Terran)	4 - 3	Lee "MarineKing" Jung Hoon (Prime) (Terran)
2011	Sony Ericsson Global StarCraft II League Oct.	Lee "Curious" Won Pyo (ST) (Zerg)	4 - 0	Kim "Oz" Hak Soo (FXO) (Protoss)

=== Special Tournaments ===
Champions of special tournaments are not considered GSL Champions.

Year	Name of Tournament	Winner	Result of Final	Runner-up
2010	GomTV All-Stars Invitational 2010	Han "Kyrix" Joon (Zenith) (Zerg)	2 - 0	Lee "MarineKing" Jung Hoon (Prime) (Terran)
2011	Arena of Legends	Lee "MarineKing" Jung Hoon (Prime) (Terran)	4 - 1	Park "DongRaeGu" Soo Ho (MVP) (Zerg)
2011	Arena of Legends: Team Ace Invitational	Jeong "MVP" Jong Hyeon (IM) (Terran)	3 - 2	Kim "GanZi" Dong Ju (SlayerS) (Terran)
2012	Arena of Legends: King of Kongs	Park "DongRaeGu" Soo Ho (MVP) (Zerg)	4 - 1	Hwang "LosirA" Kang Ho (IM) (Zerg)

The third Arena of Legends tournament's name comes from Hong Jin-ho, a Brood War legend who was famous for getting second place. It invited non-champion runner-up players from previous GSL tournaments.

== Team League ==
GOMeXp (then GOMTV) ran a team league named GOMTV Global StarCraft II Team League (GSTL) from 2011 to 2013. In late 2011–2012, the rival KeSPA-run Proleague, which was also a team event, switched from Brood War to StarCraft II (with 2011-12 SK Planet Proleague Season 2). GOMeXp stopped running its own team league, with the last event run at the end of 2013.

== Other ==
=== Foreigner qualification house ===
GOMTV used to run a house for select foreigners to live in while attempting to qualify for Code A. The house could accommodate up to 8 players. Players are responsible for travel to the GOM house, but all expenses other than food were covered by GOMTV. The house closed in November 2012.

=== GSL-MLG Exchange Program ===
Major League Gaming and GOMTV announced a player exchange program between the tournaments. MLG will invite and provide travel for four Korean players every tournament and the players will be seeded directly into Championship pool. Starting from MLG Anaheim 2011 the winner of the tournament is given GSL Code S seed and top three non-Korean players (top four if the winner is Korean) are given Code A seeds.

MLG Columbus 2011 was the first event to see Korean invites. Moon "MMA" Sung Won won the tournament and the other invites finished 2nd, 3rd, and 8th. Non-Korean players accepting Code A seeds were Johan "NaNiWa" Lucchesi, Marcus "ThorZaIN" Eklöf, and Jian Carlo "Fenix" Morayra Alejo. They participated in both GSL August and GSTL August team leagues. For the team league, they formed a team, F.United, together with players from a Korean pro team, WeMadeFox.

It was thought that NaNiwa would have gotten the Code S spot for his second-place finish at the national finals at MLG Providence 2011, but it was revealed afterward that Code S would not have been given out at that event.

The GSL-MLG Exchange Program has since been nullified, as GSL is now partnered with IPL. MLG CEO Sundance DiGiovanni has hinted at the Naniwa Code S scandal as possible reasoning for the breakup of the partnership.

With the closure of IPL, the partner program between the two is now finished. Since 2013, the GSL took over as the Korean part of the World Championship Series created by Blizzard Entertainment.

=== Blizzard Cup ===
2011 and 2012 saw "Blizzard Cup" tournaments for an invited set of 10 players: 5 determined by GSL ranking, and 5 invitees from champions of other events such as MLG, BlizzCon and World Cyber Games 2011.

=== GSL vs. the World ===
The World Championship was a yearly tournament that invited eight of the top non-Korean players to South Korea to play against the top eight Korean players. This was a two-part tournament; the first being a Korea versus the World team tournament, the second being a 16-man single-elimination tournament.

== See also ==
- StarCraft II StarLeague
- Global StarCraft II Team League
- StarCraft II in esports
