= StarCraft II =

Military science fiction video game

- A logo variant for StarCraft II
- Genre: Real-time strategy
- Developer: Blizzard Entertainment
- Publisher: Blizzard Entertainment
- Creators: Dustin Browder; Chris Metzen; Samwise Didier
- Platforms: Microsoft Windows; macOS
- First release: StarCraft II: Wings of Liberty; July 27, 2010
- Latest release: StarCraft II: Nova Covert Ops; November 22, 2016
- Parent series: StarCraft

StarCraft II is a real-time strategy video game created by Blizzard Entertainment, first released in 2010. A sequel to the successful StarCraft, released in 1998, it is set in a militaristic far future. The narrative centers on a galactic struggle for dominance among various races.

StarCraft II single-player campaign is split into three installments, each of which focuses on one of the three races: StarCraft II: Wings of Liberty (released in 2010), Heart of the Swarm (2013) and Legacy of the Void (2015). A final campaign pack called StarCraft II: Nova Covert Ops was released in 2016.

StarCraft II multi-player gameplay spawned a separate esports competition that later drew interest from companies other than Blizzard, and attracted attention in South Korea and elsewhere, similar to the original StarCraft esports.

Since 2017, StarCraft II multi-player mode, co-op mode and the first single-player campaign have been free-to-play.

== Story ==
The story of StarCraft II continues on the story of the original StarCraft releases, dealing with the races of StarCraft and characters of StarCraft.

Wings of Liberty is set four years after the events of StarCraft: Brood War, and focuses on the conflict between Jim Raynor's rebel faction and the Terran Dominion regime led by its emperor, Arcturus Mengsk. The Zerg reappear as a frequent menace, though Raynor ultimately recovers their incapacitated queen Sarah Kerrigan from the Zerg home world.

In Heart of the Swarm, the Dominion attacks Raynor and Kerrigan, and the story mainly follows Kerrigan's exploits against Mengsk's forces as well as the newly emerged Protoss-Zerg hybrids.

In Legacy of the Void, the Protoss are the protagonists, led by Zeratul and Artanis, fighting against the architect of the Protoss-Zerg hybrids, the malevolent being known as Amon. In a short epilogue after the end of Legacy of the Void, all three factions join to confront Amon inside the Void.

Nova Covert Ops takes place sometime after Amon's final defeat, and follows the ghost operative Nova as she uncovers a conspiracy that threatens the reformed Terran Dominion.

== Games ==
Release timeline
2010	StarCraft II: Wings of Liberty
2011
2012
2013	StarCraft II: Heart of the Swarm
2014
2015	StarCraft II: Legacy of the Void
2016	StarCraft II: Nova Covert Ops

StarCraft II: Wings of Liberty was released in 2010, taking place four years after the end of StarCraft: Brood War. Two expansions, Heart of the Swarm and Legacy of the Void (both currently stand alone games), were planned from the beginning; the former was released in 2013 and the latter was released in 2015.

All the games in the main series are real-time strategy games, where the player views the events as a military commander for each of the three species.

StarCraft II: Wings of Liberty is the official sequel to StarCraft released for Windows and Mac OS X by Blizzard Entertainment on July 27, 2010. The game was announced at the Worldwide Invitational in South Korea on May 19, 2007, with a pre-rendered cinematic cut scene trailer and a gameplay demonstration of the Protoss. Further demonstrations regarding the game's new features have been showcased at subsequent BlizzCons and other games conventions. The game incorporates a new 3D graphics engine and adds new features such as the Havok physics engine. StarCraft II also incorporates DirectX 10 level effects in Windows. Originally envisioned as a single game, StarCraft II was split into three parts during development, one for focusing on each race. The base game, Wings of Liberty, follows the Terrans, while two expansion packs, Heart of the Swarm and Legacy of the Void, have been released to complement Wings of Liberty and further the story from the views of the Zerg and Protoss, respectively. The story of Wings of Liberty continues from four years after the conclusion of Brood War and revolves around Jim Raynor's struggles against the Terran Dominion.

StarCraft II: Heart of the Swarm is an expansion pack to StarCraft II: Wings of Liberty and was released on March 12, 2013. It is part two of the StarCraft II trilogy. The expansion includes additional units and multiplayer changes from Wings of Liberty, as well as a continuing campaign focusing on Kerrigan and the Zerg race. It spans 27 missions (20 main missions and 7 side missions).

The saga of StarCraft is ultimately completed with StarCraft II: Legacy of the Void, which was released on November 10, 2015. StarCraft II: Legacy of the Void is a stand-alone game in which new units are added to all three races as well as changing existing units, and also makes groundbreaking changes to the economy-aspect of the game. The story of StarCraft is concluded by following the Protoss Race in their quest to reclaim their homeworld and for Kerrigan to ultimately slay the greatest threat to the entire universe. The game is divided into a 3-mission prologue, a 19-mission main story campaign, and a 3-mission epilogue that wraps everything up.

At BlizzCon 2015, during the "Future of StarCraft II" presentation, it was revealed that Blizzard will release additional mission packs to keep players engaged with StarCraft II. The Nova Covert Ops mission pack consists of three episodes, with a total of nine new missions. It did not require the purchase of StarCraft II and could be played with the Starter Edition. The release date for the first episode was March 29, 2016. At the same time, Blizzard has announced that new commanders are planned to be added to the Co-Op mode in Legacy of the Void as a DLC, with Karax to be the first addition given for free.

== Development ==
StarCraft II was announced on May 19, 2007, nearly a decade after the original, at the Blizzard Worldwide Invitational in Seoul, South Korea. StarCraft II was being developed, under the codename Medusa, for concurrent release on Windows XP, Windows Vista and Mac OS X. Blizzard announced a release date for July 27, 2010. Development on the game began in 2003, shortly after Warcraft III: The Frozen Throne was released.

== Music ==
The soundtrack for StarCraft II was provided by Derek Duke, Glenn Stafford, Neal Acree, and Russell Brower.

Brower, Blizzard's Director of Audio, has suggested that the music of StarCraft serves two functions: the music heard during gameplay is designed to be unobtrusive in order to allow the player to focus, with only the music that attaches to the cinematic interludes permitted to become more distinctive. Brower has also pointed out that certain musical themes in StarCraft II become associated with certain characters, a technique borrowed from composers such as John Williams and Richard Wagner.

The original material for the Wings of Liberty soundtrack spans approximately four hours. Brower has said in interviews that his team was consciously seeking a film-score feel for StarCraft II. In a short commentary provided for Blizzard, he recounted that the orchestral music for StarCraft II: Wings of Liberty was performed by 78 members of the San Francisco Symphony and Opera and recorded at the Skywalker stage at the Lucasfilm Ranch in Marin County, California, under the name 'Skywalker Symphony Orchestra', conducted by Eímear Noone. Brower also recalled the use of a 32-voice choir in Seattle, Washington. Both these recording sessions were mixed by John Kurlander, who had previously worked on Peter Jackson's The Lord of the Rings and The Beatles' Abbey Road. The Terran country and blues pieces were recorded at Dreamland studio in Woodstock, New York and performed by members of Peter Gabriel's band, including bassist Tony Levin and drummer Jerry Marotta. Remaining pieces were recorded at the Blizzard studios, performed by musicians such as Laurence Juber (formerly of Wings) and Tommy Morgan. The soundtrack also contains John Bacchus Dykes and William Whiting's hymn Eternal Father, Strong to Save (1860).

The orchestral music for Heart of the Swarm was likewise recorded in Marin County, again with the services of Kurlander and Noone, with 80 performers from the Skywalker Symphony Orchestra.

Brower stated in an interview in 2013 that he intended to continue the process of associative musical themes in Legacy of the Void.

== Reception ==
Aggregate review scores As of June 28, 2026.
Game	GameRankings	Metacritic
StarCraft II: Wings of Liberty	92%	93
StarCraft II: Heart of the Swarm	86%	86
StarCraft II: Legacy of the Void	88%	88
StarCraft II: Nova Covert Ops - Mission Pack 1	—	73
StarCraft II: Nova Covert Ops - Mission Pack 2	—	—
StarCraft II: Nova Covert Ops - Mission Pack 3	—	—

The release of StarCraft II: Wings of Liberty performed very well commercially and critically, selling 1.8 million copies within the first forty eight hours of release, which breaks the record of best selling strategy game in the history of the gaming industry. It received very positive reviews with an aggregate GameRankings score of 93%, and was nominated as the "Best PC Game of 2010" on GameSpot. By the end of 2012, Wings of Liberty had sold more than 6 million copies. This success continued with the release of the first expansion pack, StarCraft II: Heart of the Swarm, which had a GameRankings aggregate score of 86%. The standalone expansion pack sold 1.1 million copies within the first two days of its release on March 12, 2013, and was the best-selling PC game in that quarter. StarCraft II: Legacy of the Void, the third expansion pack, was similarly well received, having a GameRankings aggregate score of 88% while selling more than 1 million copies worldwide within the first day of its release.

The StarCraft and StarCraft II series had sold over 17.6 million copies of games and expansions by the end of 2015. By the end of 2017, Blizzard had listed the combined StarCraft franchise among their brands that have lifetime revenue totaled over $1 billion.

== Multiplayer game modes ==
Aside from the single player campaigns corresponding to the four expansions, StarCraft II features several multiplayer game modes, the most common of which are the "versus" modes and the "co-op" mode.

=== Versus ===
The versus mode can be 1v1, 2v2, 3v3, 4v4, with the numbers indicating the number of players per team. The 1v1 mode is the most well-known one, and the basis for the esport competition (see below). In it, the players collect experience points and achievements, but these do not affect future gameplay per se. The complexity of the game grows as the player progresses through the ranks, based on a matchmaking system that is based on the number of wins and losses. The so-called "ladder", the ordering of all players, is organized per geographic region, and consists of tiers called leagues, ranging from the lowest bronze, through silver, gold, platinum, diamond, master and in turn the highest, grandmaster league.

As the number of players per team grows, the maps they can play on typically change as well. It is also possible to play multiplayer tournaments in each team size, where a team either wins or is eliminated. The versus mode also includes the "Archon" option, where the matches are ostensibly 1v1 but more than one human player control what is usually controlled by a single person.

=== Co-op ===
The co-op mode throws two players into intense battles against a powerful A.I., with each player controlling unique hero commanders inspired by characters from the main campaign. As matches progress, players earn XP, level up their commanders, and unlock upgrades and abilities that can dramatically change future runs and strategies. Each commander brings a distinct playstyle, encouraging teamwork, experimentation, and replayability.

To keep every mission fresh, the mode also introduces “Mutations” — special gameplay modifiers that can drastically increase the challenge with tougher enemies, unpredictable effects, and chaotic battlefield conditions. Players can choose from 18 commanders in total, evenly split across the three races, each offering their own units, powers, and tactical advantages. While the mode draws heavily from the game’s massive roster of 46 story heroes, only selected characters are fully playable in co-op.

== Professional competition ==
Since its release, StarCraft II was played professionally throughout the world, though much like its predecessor StarCraft: Brood War's professional competition, the highest level of play has historically been centered in South Korea.

Since the release of StarCraft II, a number of tournaments have been hosted in Korea and elsewhere, such as the Global StarCraft II League (GSL).

The game was widely considered the largest esport in the world during its early years and has been credited as bringing esports to the rest of the world in the way the original brought it to South Korea. It has since experienced a decline and a more recent resurgence following its transition to a free-to-play business model.

In 2012, Blizzard started the StarCraft II World Championship Series (WCS) as the primary sanctioned StarCraft II tournament circuit. Since 2013, both Korean individual leagues like the Global StarCraft II League (GSL) and non-Korean events such as Intel Extreme Masters (IEM) and Dreamhack had been included in the WCS system, distributing points and guaranteeing spots that qualify players for the Global Finals, held annually at BlizzCon.

Since 2020, Blizzard changed the format of WCS by entering into a three-year partnership with esports organizers ESL and DreamHack.

== Use in artificial intelligence ==
In November 2016 Alphabet's DeepMind branch announced a collaboration with Blizzard to create "a useful testing platform for the wider AI research community."

StarCraft II has been used in the field of multi-agent reinforcement learning for a dual purpose:

1. A proof-of-concept to show that modern reinforcement learning algorithms can compete with professional human players. In December 2018, DeepMind's StarCraft II bot, called AlphaStar, defeated professional StarCraft II players in the game for the first time. It beat the player MaNA 5–0, albeit under conditions some deemed to be unfair. A fairer version of AlphaStar attained Grandmaster status in August 2019, an accomplishment called a "landmark achievement" for the field of artificial intelligence.
2. A benchmark to measure and improve the performance of reinforcement learning algorithms that are used for environments other than StarCraft.
