= Av3k =

Polish professional player

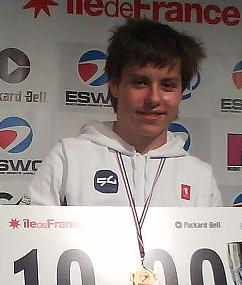
- Av3k at ESWC in July 2007

Personal information
- Name: Maciej Krzykowski
- Nickname: Avekkk
- Born: April 1, 1991 (age 35)
- Nationality: Polish

Career information
- Games: Quake Live, Quake IV, Quake III Arena, ShootMania

Team history
- Razer
- Serious Gaming
- Millenium
- Owly Six
- Virtus.Pro
- Nemiga
- Endpoint (current)

Career highlights and awards
- ESWC champion (2007)

Maciej Krzykowski (born April 1, 1991), who goes by the pseudonym Av3k (/ˈævɪk/), is a professional Quake and ShootMania player. He has Polish nationality and resides in Ostróda. He actively competes in international Quake competitions and was signed to Razer and Dutch electronic sports team Serious Gaming and French organization Millenium, but is now signed to British organisation Endpoint. On July 8, 2007, at age 16, he became the second youngest Quake champion ever after winning the Electronic Sports World Cup 2007 in Paris without losing a single map. Mark "wombat" Larsen won the first ever tournament for Quake 3 - 1999's CPL GroundZero in New York City, at the age of 15.

== Biography ==
=== Quake IV (2006–2007) ===
Av3k is widely regarded as the best Quake IV player ever alongside former Swedish professional gamer Johan "Toxjq" Quick and was defeated by only four other players: Anton "Cooller" Singov, Alex "Ztrider" Ingarv, Magnus "fox" Olsson, and Toxjq. He faced Johnathan "Fatal1ty" Wendel three times in competition and has gone undefeated. One of Av3k's victories is considered to be the sixth biggest moment in professional gaming by GamePro.

He was considered a prodigy player due to his young age. In 2006, he was nominated for Player of the Year and Quake Revelation of the Year by competitive gaming media around the world. In 2007, he was awarded the eSports Award's 'Breakthrough of the Year'.

=== Quake III (2008) ===
Following Quake IV, he focused on Quake III competitions in 2008, as it became the main competitive first-person shooter. He took third place at his first competition in the game, losing to Magnus "fox" Olsson and Alexey "Cypher" Yanushevsky at the ESWC Masters of Paris event. Later that year, he won two major competitions (DreamHack and GameGune) and took third place at the ESWC Masters of Athens in Athens, Greece. He was unable to defend his Electronic Sports World Cup title as his visa to the United States was denied.

=== Quake Live (2009–2012) ===
Following the beta launch of Quake Live, it became the main competitive first-person shooter starting in 2009, a year in which no Electronic Sports World Cup took place. This, combined with the previous cancellation of the World Series of Video Games, resulted in few remaining professional competitions. In 2010, the Electronic Sports World Cup renewed their lineup with Quake Live, as did Intel Extreme Masters. Av3k proved himself as one of the strongest players, taking second place at the European championship of the Intel Extreme Masters in 2010 and third place at the world championship. He additionally defended his DreamHack championship in 2009 and 2010.

During DreamHack Winter 2012, Av3k announced his retirement from Quake Live due to his inability to win any major tournaments in the last two years. He stated, "I just decided to not let people down anymore." After his victory of the FaceIt Legends Cup, however, Av3k retracted his previous announcement and relabelled his retirement as a hiatus. He cited his repeated losses to fellow progamer rapha demoralized him, and in response, he would take a break from Quake Live and improve his mental state.

=== ShootMania (2012–2016) ===
In June 2012, French organization Millenium signed three players to represent their ShootMania team, consisting of three current Quake players Kevin "Strenx" Baeza, Alexey "Cypher" Yanushevsky, and Av3k.

=== Overwatch (2015-17) ===
In late 2015, Av3k began to play Blizzard Gaming's new first-person shooter Overwatch, along with fellow former Quake players Cypher and Cooller. He played with Russian organisation ANOX and French team Owly Six, achieving few notable results. On 14 June 2017 it was announced that the Owly Six roster had disbanded.

=== Quake Champions (2017-present) ===
Av3k returned to the Quake franchise in August 2017 with the release of Quake Champions, the most recent game in the series. On August 21 he signed with Virtus.Pro, famous for their successful Counter-Strike: Global Offensive lineup, also from Poland. His signing came after Virtus.Pro player Cypher was denied entry to the United States ahead of QuakeCon 2017. On 13 June 2018, Virtus.Pro announced it was closing its Quake Champions division.

On 19 September 2018, Av3k and Cypher signed with Belarusian organisation Nemiga Gaming. While with Nemiga, Av3k achieved a runner-up finish in Dreamhack Winter 2018. On February 16, 2019, Nemiga announced that Av3k's contract had expired and he and Cypher left the organisation, which closed its Quake Champions division.

On July 23, 2019, Av3k signed with British organisation Endpoint. On 10 August 2020 Endpoint announced that Av3k had renewed his contract for another year. Av3k co-hosts Endpoint's Quake podcast, Quake: A Game of Champions, with British commentator Zoot.

== Notable tournament results ==
=== Quake Live ===
Year	Competition	Venue	Position	Event	Notes
2013	DreamHack Winter	Elmia in Jonkoping, Sweden	4th	Duel	$1,536
2012	FaceIt Legends Cup	Online	1st	Duel	$658. Retracted retirement announcement, relabling it as a hiatus
2012	DreamHack Winter	Elmia in Jonkoping, Sweden	3rd/4th	Duel	$1,508. Announced retirement from Quake Live
2012	Zynaps' Cup	Online	1st	Duel	$600
2012	Adroits	Wzzrd in Enschede, Netherlands	3rd	Duel	$800
2012	The Arena: Quake Live Invitation #3	Online	1st	Duel	$500
2011	DreamHack Winter	Elmia in Jonkoping, Sweden	3rd	Duel	$1,427
2011	DreamHack Winter	Elmia in Jonkoping, Sweden	3rd	Team Death Match	$357. With the team tRainspotting
2011	QuakeCon TDM Invitational Masters	Hilton Anatole in Dallas, Texas	1st	Team Death Match	$4,000
2011	Asus Summer	Online	1st	Duel	$217
2011	DreamHack Summer	Elmia in Jonkoping, Sweden	5th/6th	Duel	
2011	DreamHack Summer	Elmia in Jonkoping, Sweden	3rd	Team Death Match	$195. With the team Serious Gaming
2011	Intel Extreme Masters Season V World Championship Finals	CeBIT in Hanover, Germany	5th/6th	Duel	$600
2011	Intel Extreme Masters Season V European Championship Finals	Kyiv Cybersports Arena in Kyiv, Ukraine	2nd	Duel	$2,000
2010	DreamHack Winter	Elmia in Jonkoping, Sweden	5th-8th	Duel	$3,908
2010	FnaticMSI PLAY BEAT IT	Elmia in Jonkoping, Sweden	5th/6th	Duel	
2010	Intel Extreme Masters Season V Global Challenge: Cologne	Gamescom at Koelnmesse in Cologne, Germany	3rd	Duel	$850
2010	Electronic Sports World Cup	Disneyland Park in Paris, France	2nd	Duel	$4,000
2010	DreamHack Summer	Elmia in Jonkoping, Sweden	1st	Duel	$3,908
2010	Intel Extreme Masters Season IV World Championship Finals	CeBIT in Hanover, Germany	3rd	Duel	$1,600
2010	Intel Extreme Masters Season IV European Championship Finals	Cologne, Germany	2nd	Duel	$1,500
2009	DreamHack Winter	Elmia in Jonkoping, Sweden	1st	Duel	$3,586
2009	QuakeCon Masters Championship	Gaylord Texan Resort Hotel & Convention Center in Grapevine, Texas	9th-12th	Duel	

=== Quake IV ===
Year	Competition	Venue	Position	Event	Notes
2007	Multiplay i32 Cup	Newbury, Berkshire	2nd	Duel	$3,500
2007	World Series of Video Games Toronto	Toronto, Ontario, Canada	4th	Duel	$1,200
2007	Electronic Sports World Cup	Paris, France	1st	Duel	$10,000
2007	World Series of Video Games Lanwar	Louisville, Kentucky	1st	Duel	$5,250
2007	Multiplay i30 & Belkin Tournament	Newbury, Berkshire	1st	Duel	$4,000
2006	Poznan Game Arena	Poznan, Poland	1st	Duel	$1,500
2006	World Cyber Games All Stars	Monza, Italy	3rd	2v2	With the player Stermy
2006	World Cyber Games All Stars	Monza, Italy	6th	Duel	
2006	DigitalLife	New York, New York	2nd	Duel	$3,500
2006	QuakeCon	Hilton Anatole in Dallas, Texas	4th	Duel	$3,000
2006	QuakeCon	Hilton Anatole in Dallas, Texas	9th-12th	2v2	With the player forever
2006	The Gathering	Hamar Olympic Hall in Hamar, Norway	1st	Duel	$837
2006	Samsung Netgamez	Nieuwegein, Netherlands	1st	Duel	$360

=== Quake III Arena ===
Year	Competition	Venue	Position	Event	Notes
2008	DreamHack Winter	Elmia in Jonkoping, Sweden	1st	Duel	$1,800
2008	Electronic Sports World Cup Masters of Athens	Athens, Greece	3rd	Duel	$2,000
2008	GameGune	Bilbao, Spain	1st	Duel	$3,923
2008	Electronic Sports World Cup Masters of Paris	Paris, France	3rd	Duel	$1,000

== Awards and nominations ==
Year	Nominee / work	Award	Result
2007	Quake 4 Player of the Year	Global Gaming League	Nominated
2007	Breakthrough of the Year	eSports Award	Won
2007	Best FPS Duel Player	eSports Award	Nominated
2006	Quake Revelation of the Year	Global Gaming League	Nominated
