= Serious Gaming =

Dutch professional gaming team

- Divisions: Quake; WarCraft III: The Frozen Throne; Counter-Strike 1.6; Painkiller; Call of Duty 2 Defense of the Ancients
- Founded: 2004
- Location: Amsterdam, Netherlands
- Manager: Sebastiaan Peeperkorn
- Partners: Razer USA
- Website: www.serious-gaming.com

Serious Gaming is a professional gaming team based in Amsterdam, Netherlands. It was founded in 2004 by entrepreneur Bas Peeperkorn. Serious Gaming is known for their achievements in first-person shooter Deathmatch tournaments, most notably those by Quake series players Maciej "av3k" Krzykowski and Cypher.

== History ==
2005

Serious Gaming was founded in 2004 by Bas Peeperkorn, the team's first signing was Painkiller player Niels van Tilborg. Painkiller was the game used for the US$1,000,000 2005 CPL World Tour and following van Tilborg the following players were signed and represented Serious Gaming throughout the tour: Fredrik Edesater and Stefan Timmermans. Highlights for the team included a ninth-place finish at the Chile stop and two players being among the 32 players in the world tour finals.

In 2005 Serious Gaming also competed in televised competition at the World eSport Games in Seoul, Korea, being represented at the second edition of the event by a Counter-Strike division consisting of Finnish players. This division would disband shortly after their stay in Seoul.

2006–2007

Following the 2005 World Tour the main focus of the first-person shooter Deatmatch scene switched from Painkiller to the newly released Quake IV and Serious Gaming followed. Contracts with van Tilborg and Edesater ended, Timmermans would take a management position and help guide two newly signed players in the professional gaming scene: Markus Andersen and Maciej Krzykowski. Andersen would develop into a champion player at the national level but never take the step to international competition. Kryzkowski quickly established himself as a major contender in international competition, being recognized as the newcomer of the year in all of eSports in 2006. Kryzkowski ended up winning the Quake competition at ESWC 2007 without losing a map, becoming the youngest Quake and ESWC world champion in history.

2006 was also the year Serious Gaming established a Warcraft III: The Frozen Throne division, originally signing Oskar Rudberg and Jos Buijvoets. Rudberg would retire shortly after joining and Buijvoets transitioned into a managerial role. The team signed and released a variety of players including (now) professional gamers Benjamin Baker and Daniel Spenst. Eventually a stable line-up of players would emerge that represented the team for several years including Kevin van der Kooi, Nikolaus Cassidy and Hjalmar Högberg.

Serious Gaming also signed two separate European champion Call of Duty 2 teams, the first of which disbanded several months after joining and the second of which disbanded after unsuccessfully trying to transition to Call of Duty 4: Modern Warfare.

2008–2010

Following the collapse of the World Series of Video Games the focus of the Deathmatch scene switched back to Quake III in 2008. Serious Gaming signed Alexey Yanushevsky in July 2008. Yanushevsky would win the 2008 Electronic Sports World Cup with Kryzkowski being unable to defend his title due to his visa being rejected. Yanushevsky would later also win the professional tournament at QuakeCon 2008 which was the first time QuakeLive was used at a major professional gaming event, this game would quickly become the standard for professional Deathmatch competition and remains to be until today. The two would compete in various Quake competitions throughout 2008, 2009 and 2010 and in Tek-9 Network's inaugural QuakeLive ranking (February 2010) Yanushevsky was ranked the world's number one QuakeLive player with Kryzkowski taking a third place. Also signed 1 November 2009 was Adrien Denis "in full harmony with the teams philosophy of converting young talented players into tournament winners".

Individual Serious Gaming players won tournaments at the national and continental level. After signing Kim Dong Hwan the team also competed at the highest levels of team leagues, culminating in a third place at the Warcraft 3 Champions League season XVI. Kim was recognized as one of the most impressive newcomers in Warcraft III. In 2010 Cassidy and Buijvoets would transition to form a StarCraft II squad competing in the newly released StarCraft II beta while both still filling a role in the WarCraft III division. This year van der Kooi would leave Serious Gaming to lead a Heroes of Newerth division for professional gaming team fnatic. Added in 2010 would be Lennart Roest in order to ensure the team's viability in team competitions. On 21 May 2010, van der Kooi re-joined the real-time strategy roster as part of the StarCraft II squad. He would be joined by Dlovan van den Bosch on 14 June 2010 and Alexander Hein on 11 August 2010.

Serious Gaming also signed a French Defense of the Ancients division in 2008. Several months after announcing the team the Electronic Sports World Cup announced the inclusion of Defense of the Ancients at their main event. Serious Gaming Defense of the Ancients ended up winning the French championship and qualify for the 2008 Electronic Sports World Cup where they would take 7th place. Following this tournament the Serious Gaming organisation and its Defense of the Ancients division parted amicably.

== Current team structure ==
=== Management ===
- Bas Peeperkorn, 2004–present (owner)
- Jos Buijvoets, 2006–present (real-time strategy)

=== Players ===
- Maciej Krzykowski, 2006–present (Quake series)
- Alexey Yanushevsky, 2008–2012(Quake series)
- Nikolaus Cassidy, 2007–2008 / 2009–present (StarCraft II)
- Adrien Denis, 2009–present (Quake Series)
- Kim Dong Hwan, 2009–present (StarCraft II)
- Lennart Roest, 2010–present (StarCraft II)
- Kevin van der Kooi, 2007–2010 / 2010–present (StarCraft II)
- Dlovan van den Bosch 2010–present (StarCraft II)
- Alexander Hein 2010–present (StarCraft II)

== Notable former players and management ==
- Hjalmar Högberg, 2007–2010 (retired)
- Benjamin Baker, 2006–2007 (signed with Four Kings)
- Daniel Spenst, 2006 (signed with SK Gaming)
- Stefan Timmermans, 2005–2010 (Deathmatch manager and player)

== Tournament results ==
=== 2022 ===
- 1st – ASUS Summer – Treadway (QuakeLive)
- 1st – QuakeCon 2010 professional tournament – Treadway (QuakeLive)
- 2nd – Electronic Sports World Cup 2010 – Krzykowski (QuakeLive)
- 1st – DreamHack Summer Kaspersky QUAKE LIVE Championships – Krzykowski (QuakeLive)
- 2nd – DreamHack Summer Kaspersky QUAKE LIVE Championships – Treadway (QuakeLive)
- 1st – ESL Electronic Pro Series Benelux season 4 – Denis (QuakeLive)
- 1st – ASUS Spring – Treadway (QuakeLive)
- 3rd – ESL Intel Extreme Masters IV World Championship Finals – Krzykowski(QuakeLive)
- 4th – ESL Intel Extreme Masters IV World Championship Finals – Treadway (QuakeLive)
- 1st – ASUS Winter – Treadway (QuakeLive)
- 3rd – WarCraft III Champions League season XVI – Real Time Strategy division (WarCraft III: The Frozen Throne)
- 1st – ESL Extreme Masters IV European Championship Finals – Treadway (QuakeLive)
- 2nd – ESL Extreme Masters IV European Championship Finals – Krzykowski(QuakeLive)
- 1st – XP League VI – Dong Hawn (WarCraft III: The Frozen Throne)

=== 2009 ===
- 4th – International e-Sports Festival – van der Kooi (WarCraft III: The Frozen Throne)
- 1st – Dreamhack Winter 2009 – Krzykowski(QuakeLive)
- 2nd – ESL Electronic Pro Series Scandanivia season 1 – Högberg (WarCraft III: The Frozen Throne)
- 1st – ASUS Autumn – Yanushevsky (Quake III)
- 3rd – QuakeCon Masters Tournament – Yanushevsky (QuakeLive)
- 2nd – Intel Extreme Masters Global Challenge – Yanushevsky (QuakeLive)
- 1st – ASUS Summer – Yanushevsky (Quake III)
- 2nd – BlizzCon Regional Championship – Cassidy (WarCraft III: The Frozen Throne)
- 2nd – European Nations Championship – van der Kooi, Buijvoets [as part of team Netherlands] (WarCraft III: The Frozen Throne)
- 2nd – ESL Electronic Pro Series Benelux season 2 – van der Kooi (WarCraft III: The Frozen Throne)

=== 2008 ===
- 1st – ASUS Autumn – Yanushevsky (Quake III)
- 1st – Dreamhack Winter 2008 professional competition – Krzykowski(Quake III)
- 2nd – ESL Electronic Pro Series Benelux season 1 – van der Kooi (WarCraft III: The Frozen Throne)
- 3rd – Electronic Sports World Cup Masters of Athens – Krzykowski(Quake III)
- 4th – Electronic Sports World Cup Masters of Athens – Yanushevsky (Quake III)
- 1st – BlizzCon Regional Championship – Cassidy (WarCraft III: The Frozen Throne)
- 3rd – BlizzCon Regional Championship – Garneau (WarCraft III: The Frozen Throne)
- 1st – Electronic Sports World Cup – Yanushevsky (Quake III)
- 7th – Electronic Sports World Cup – Defense of the Ancients division (DotA)
- 1st – QuakeCon 2008 QuakeLive Championship – Yanushevsky (QuakeLive)
- 1st – GameGune – Krzykowski(Quake III)
- 2nd – Warcraft 3 Premier League VIII – Real Time Strategy division (WarCraft III)
- 3rd – Electronic Sports World Cup Masters of Paris – Krzykowski(Quake III)
- 5th – Electronic Sports World Cup Masters of Paris – Defense of the Ancients division (DotA)
- 1st – World Cyber Games Pan-American championship – Cassidy (WarCraft III: The Frozen Throne)

=== 2007 ===
- 2nd – Multiplay i32 $20.000 Quake IV Cup – Krzykowski(Quake IV)
- 2nd – Stars War IV – Karev [As part of team Romantic Elves] (WarCraft III: The Frozen Throne)
- 2nd – DreamHack Winter 2007 – Högberg (WarCraft III: The Frozen Throne)
- 1st – Electronic Sports World Cup 2007 – Krzykowski(Quake IV)
- 1st – World Series of Video Games, Louisville – Krzykowski(Quake IV)
- 3rd – Wonderbase – Call of Duty 2 division (Call of Duty 2)
- 1st – Crossfire Prize Challenge 2 – Call of Duty 2 division (Call of Duty 2)
- 1st – Samsung Netgamez – Call of Duty 2 division (Call of Duty 2)
- 1st – Multiplay i30 & Belkin Tournament – Krzykowski(Quake IV)

=== 2006 ===
- 3rd World Cyber Games All-stars 2on2 – Krzykowski(Quake IV)
- 5th World Cyber Games All-stars 1on1 – Krzykowski(Quake IV)
- 2nd Digital Life Expo – Kryzkowski (Quake IV)
- 4th QuakeCon 2006 professional competition – Krzykowski(Quake IV)
- 1st Samsung Netgamez – Krzykowski(Quake IV)
- 1st Samsung Netgamez – Counter-strike division (Counter-Strike 1.6)

=== 2005 ===
- 9th CPL World Tour Chile – Edesater (Painkiller)
- 9th World e-Sport Games II – Counter-strike division (Counter-Strike 1.6)
- 1st World e-Sport Games II European qualifier – Counter-strike division (Counter-Strike 1.6)
