= Titan (esports) =

Defunct esports organization

- Former divisions: Counter-Strike: Global Offensive; Dota 2 Quake Live; Smite
- Founded: September 2013
- Folded: January 2016
- Based in: Singapore
- Website: www.titan.pro

Titan was a professional esports organization founded in September 2013. Titan formerly sponsored teams in Counter-Strike: Global Offensive, Dota 2, Quake Live, and Smite. CEO and founder Damien Grust announced the organisation's dissolution on 13 January 2016, citing financial issues.

== Dota 2 ==
Titan started its Dota 2 team in 2013 by recruiting four players from Orange Esports, Lee "KyXy" Kong Yang, Lim "Net" Wai Pern, Joel "Xtinct" Chan and Chong "Ohaiyo" Xin Khoo, in addition to Chua "Ice" Chee Cai.

Although the team secured a podium finish at Mineski Pro Gaming League, in December 2013 Ice was dismissed from the team, being replaced first by Singaporean carry player Gavin ‘Meracle’ Kang and then Malaysian player Ng Wei "NWP" Poong (formerly known as "Yamateh").

The team went on to win the Asian Cyber Games 2013 and finished 9th/10th place at The International 4 in 2014.

In October 2014, the Titan Dota 2 team was disbanded and the division was officially put on hold. Most of the players went on to join the newly formed Team Malaysia.

== Counter-Strike: Global Offensive ==
In January 2014, Titan formed a CS:GO team by recruiting the VeryGames team of Kévin "Ex6TenZ" Droolans, Nathan "NBK" Schmitt, Edouard "SmithZz" Dubourdeaux, Adil "ScreaM" Benrlitom, and Richard "shox" Papillon. The team went on to win the February 2014 DreamHack Invitational tournament, defeating their rivals Ninjas in Pyjamas. With Copenhagen Games 2014 the first LAN to do groups based on world rankings, Titan was ranked as the second best team in the world, but failed to deliver at the event.

The team's lineup changed in May 2014, with the departure of shox and the arrival of Kenny "kennyS" Schrub. Following the change, the team did poorly, although they took second place at Gfinity 3 in August 2014.

In September 2014, the roster was restructured again. Only Ex6TenZ and kennyS were retained, and they were joined by three players from Team LDLC: Dan "apEX" Madesclaire, Mathieu "Maniac" Quiquerez and Hovik "KQLY" Tovmassian. The new lineup then went on to win the DreamHack Stockholm Invitational in Globen, taking down parts of their former teammates in LDLC. KennyS was also singled out as "the best Counter-Strike: Global Offensive player in the world" by CS:GO analyst Duncan "Thorin" Shields, with the team being ranked as no. 5 on his Top 10 World Ranking list leading up to DreamHack Winter 2014.

In November 2014, Hovik "KQLY" Tovmassian was dismissed from the team after receiving a VAC ban, with returning CS:S player Cédric "RpK" Guipouy taking his place. Also returning but in July 2015 would be previous Titan team members shox and SmithZz, replacing the two exiting players apEX and kennyS. In September 2015 Maniac, another longtime member, left the team, making room for yet another returning player, ScreaM.

However, on January 13, 2016, Titan's Founder and CEO, Damien Grust, issued a statement on its official website, announcing their inability to sustain their CS division due to financial constraints, leading to its disbandment.

"From then on, it was an uphill battle, and I pushed myself to reinvest in Titan to keep the company afloat for another year, hoping we could overcome the challenges. Throughout the year, we struggled to secure sponsorships to support our struggling yet talented CS and SMITE teams. We also explored options like selling company shares or merging with others, but none of these opportunities materialized with potential partners we approached."

"Now, as we start 2016, we lack the necessary budget to maintain our CS team or compensate our exceptional staff. It's a deeply saddening situation."

== Smite ==
In December 2014 Titan expanded its esports presence by recruiting Aquila, securing the lineup of Nate “Ataraxia” Mark, Andreas “KanyeLife” Christmansson, Emil “PrettyPriMe” Edström, Thomas “Repikas” Skallebaek, and Kevin “Confrey” Confrey.

Founded as Agilitas at the start of the Smite Pro league qualifier in 2013, the team had stayed largely intact since its inception, adding manager Job “CaptCoach” Hilbers and analyst Erik “Omgimabird” Sjösten as support staff.

Playing their way through the Smite Challenger Cup and placing 1st seven weeks in a row, the team ended 2014 by winning the Smite European Regionals after a 2-0 clean sweep against SK Gaming in the finals. In the following 2015 Smite World Championship tournament the team managed to beat Oh My God and SK Gaming, with Titan taking an impressive second place after losing 2–3 to the home soil lineup of Cognitive Prime in the grand final.

In August 2015 Job “CaptCoach” Hilbers left the team in search for new challenges, and the following month saw the team part ways with Kevin “Confrey” Confrey, being replaced by the up-and-coming talent of Nicklas "Brotuz" Petersen.

On 12 January 2016, Titan's Smite division dissolved due to the departure of the current Titan SMITE roster. It would only be a mere day later that Titan's CSGO division followed suite and was shut down, along with the rest of Titan.

"The departure from Titan also signals the end of the current roster, with parts of the Thomas "Repikas" Skallebaek, Nicklas "Brotuz" Petersen, Nate "Ataraxia" Mark, Emil "PrettyPriMe" Edström and Andreas "KanyeLife" Christmansson lineup going their separate ways."

== Former players ==
=== Counter-Strike: Global Offensive ===
- Nathan "NBK" Schmitt
- Kenny "kennyS" Schrub
- Adil "ScreaM" Benrlitom
- Dan "apEX" Madesclaire
- Mathieu "Maniac" Quiquerez
- Hovik "KQLY" Tovmassian
- Kévin "Ex6TenZ" Droolans
- Richard "shox" Papillon
- Cédric "RpK" Guipouy
- Edouard "SmithZz" Dubourdeaux
- Victor "LiCroM" Albe
- Jérôme "NiaK" Sudries (Manager)

=== Smite ===
- Kevin "Confrey" Confrey (Hunter)
- Thomas "Repikas" Skallebaek (Jungler/Guardian)
- Nicklas "Brotuz" Petersen (Solo)
- Nate "Ataraxia" Mark (Hunter)
- Emil "PrettyPriMe" Edström (Mid)
- Andreas "KanyeLife" Christmansson (Guardian)
- Job "CaptCoach" Hilbers (Coach)
- Erik "Omgimabird" Sjösten (Analyst)

=== Dota 2 ===
- Chua "Ice" Chee Cai
- Galvin Kang Jian "Meracle" Wen
- Chong Xin "Ohaiyo" Khoo
- Wei Poong "NWP" Ng
- Wai Pern "Net" Lim
- Joel Zhan Leong "XtiNcT" Chan
- Kong Yang "kY.xY" Lee

=== Quake Live ===
- Alexey "cYpheR" Yanushevsky
- Andrey "Vamper" Syrnikov
- Sergey "evil" Orekhov

== Achievements ==
=== Counter-Strike: Global Offensive ===
Place	Tournament	Location	Date
2nd Place	ESEA s15	Dallas, US	19 January 2014
1st Place	DreamHack Invitational	Stockholm, Sweden	21 February 2014
3rd Place	StarSeries XI	Kyiv, Ukraine	5 May 2014
2nd Place	Gfinity 3	London, United Kingdom	4 August 2014
1st Place	DreamHack Invitational	Stockholm, Sweden	27 September 2014
2nd Place	Asus ROG	Helsinki, Finland	31 January 2015
2nd Place	Pantamera CSGO Challenge	Stockholm, Sweden	7 February 2015
1st Place	Gamers Assembly 2015	Poitiers, France	6 April 2015
2nd Place	ESL Pro League Winter 2015	Cologne, Germany	12 April 2015
3rd Place	ESEA s18	Dallas, US	19 April 2015
3rd Place	Gaming Paradise	Portorož, Slovenia	9 September 2015
3rd Place	CEVO Season 8	Columbus, US	8 November 2015
14th Place	ESL One: Katowice 2015	Katowice, Silesian Voivodeship, Poland	March 12–15, 2015

=== Smite ===
Place	Tournament	Location	Date
1st Place	Wildcards	Online	26 October 2014
1st Place	SMITE European Regionals	Cologne, Germany	16 November 2014
2nd Place	SMITE World Championship 2015	Atlanta, US	11 January 2015
2nd Place	Hitbox EU Invitational	Online	12 July 2015

=== Dota 2 ===
Place	Tournament	Location	Date
1st Place	SteelSeries SEA Cup Season 3	Online	28–31 October 2013
2nd Place	GMPGL SEA Grand Finals Season Five	Quezon City, Philippines	9–10 November 2013
≈5	Rapture Gaming Network League 2013 - 2014	Online	18 May - 8 December 2013
1st Place	joinDOTA League Asia Season 1	Online	26 January - 13 April 2014
≈9	The International 2014	Seattle, Washington, United States	8–21 July 2014

=== Quake Live ===
Place	Tournament	Location	Date
1st Place	DreamHack Winter 2013	Jönköping, Sweden	1 December 2013
1st Place	QuakeCon 2014 Intel Duel Masters Invitational Championship	Dallas, Texas	20 July 2014
