= Ataraxia (disambiguation) =

Ataraxia is a Greek philosophical term for freedom from perturbation.

Ataraxia may also refer to:

- Ataraxia (band), an Italian neoclassical band
- Ataraxia/Taraxis, a 2012 EP by Pelican
- Ataraxia, a 1978 album by Passport
- Ataraxia, a 2026 album by Allt
- Ataraxia: The Unexplained, a 1975 album by Mort Garson
- "Ataraxia", a 2005 song by Team Sleep on their self-titled album Team Sleep
- "Ataraxia", a track on the 2005 album Perfect Pitch Black by Cave In
- "Ataraxia", a track on the 2021 album L.W. by King Gizzard & the Lizard Wizard
- "Ataraxia (Media Intro)", a track on the 1997 album So Much for the Afterglow by Everclear
- Ataraxia, a fictional planet in the manga series Toward the Terra
- Ataraxia (gamer), professional Smite player

== See also ==
- Hydroxyzine, or Atarax, a clinical drug used for the treatment of anxiety
