= Rapha =

Rapha may refer to:

- Rapha (biblical figure), a minor Hebrew Bible figure
- Rapha (gamer), Shane Hendrixson, American esports player
- Rapha–Gitane–Dunlop, a French cycling team 1959–1961
- Rapha (sportswear), a UK-based cycling sportswear brand founded in 2004
- Rapha Condor (and variants), later JLT–Condor, a British cycling team 2008–2014
