= DjWheat =

American esports commentator

Marcus Graham
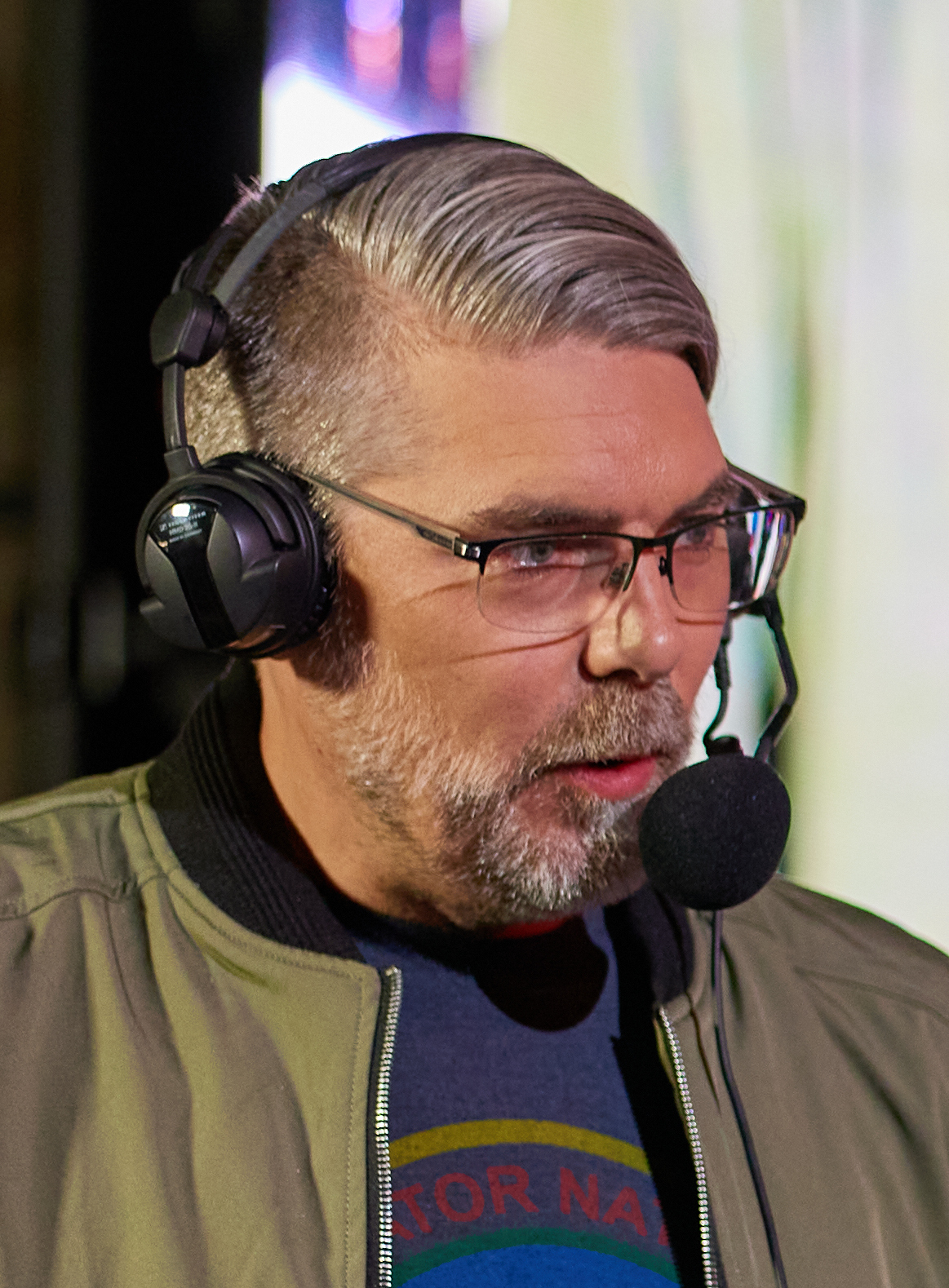
- Graham at QuakeCon 2023
- Born: 1977 or 1978 (age 48–49)
- Education: University of Nebraska–Lincoln
- Occupations: VP of Community Development at Fortis Games; Shoutcaster
- Website: djwheat.com

Marcus Graham, also known as djWheat, is an American shoutcaster and the former Director of Creator Development at Twitch, where he worked from 2011 to January 2022.

Graham is considered to be one of the earliest shoutcasters, doing play-by-play commentary at video game tournaments since the late 1990s, and has commentated over more than 50 titles. He has been referred to as the "John Madden" of esports commentating. He has hosted major gaming events, including The International and the World Cyber Games.

== Early life ==
Graham grew up in Omaha, Nebraska. He graduated from the University of Nebraska–Lincoln. After graduation, he worked in IT management and coached Quake III in his free time.

== Career ==
Graham was the leader of Clan 519, one of the top-ranked North American Quake II team deathmatch teams. His nickname was Styles519.

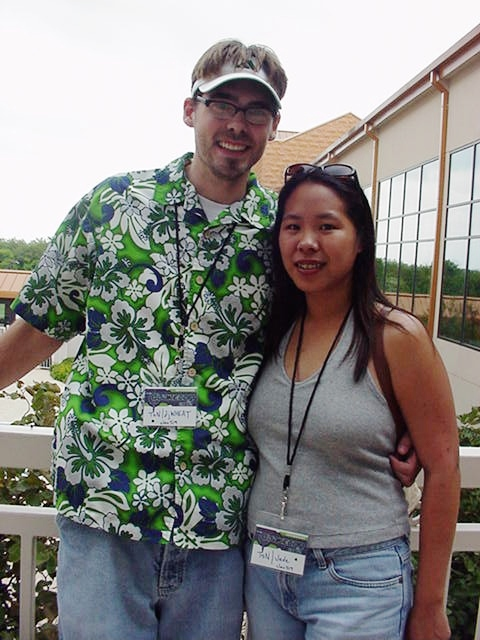
djWheat (left) and wife Jade at QuakeCon 2002 while working for TSN

Graham won $1,500 playing Quake III Arena. When he was unable to attend a tournament in Sweden in 1997, Graham relayed updates from his teams via RealAudio to a small audience listening online. However, RealAudio had an audience cap of 25, so he later transitioned to hosting his shows on SHOUTcast, which allowed for up to 1,000 listeners at a time. His broadcasting career was considered unprofitable for a long time, with a live event he broadcast in 2006 costing $18,000 in bandwidth. He broadcast on SHOUTcast seven days a week for four years. He was later invited to do live commentary in Texas in 2002 and World Cyber Games 2002 in Korea. He has since broadcast World Cyber Games 2009 and World Cyber Games 2010.

Graham later joined Team Sportscast Network (TSN) as their Quake broadcaster.

Around 2005 and 2006, Graham was working with DirecTV on the Championship Gaming Series. Shortly after DirecTV co-produced Friday Night Lights with NBC, they shuttered their gaming division and Graham moved back to Lincoln, Nebraska from Los Angeles to resume his old job in IT.

=== Twitch ===
In 2009, Graham restarted his old Inside the Game show on the live-streaming video website Stickam, which allowed him to host for free. From there, he would hop between streaming sites like Ustream and Justin.tv (and later Twitch). On Twitch, he hosted the Live On Three show with GameSpot esports reporter Rod "Slasher" Breslau and Scott "SirScoots" Smith. After Twitch created its Twitch Partner program in 2011, Graham signed up and created his Onemoregame.tv network, a parent network of other shows such as Inside the Game, Live on Three, Weapon of Choice, and Kings of Tin. In 2011, Twitch brought Graham onboard their esports partnership program.

Graham during his time at Twitch has served as director of programming, Director of Twitch Studios and Director of Creator Development.

In November 2021, Graham announced his departure from Twitch in January 2022 via his Twitter account.

=== Fortis Games ===
In September 2022, Graham announced his position of Vice President of Community Development at Fortis Games via his Twitter Account.

== Influence ==
Graham cites radio broadcaster Art Bell of Coast to Coast AM as an early influence.

Paul "Redeye" Chaloner said, "His influence on me and many others that worked alongside him helped shape the way we commentate on esports today."

== Personal life ==
Graham lives in the Mission District of San Francisco with his wife and son.
