= Cypher (gamer) =

Professional gamer

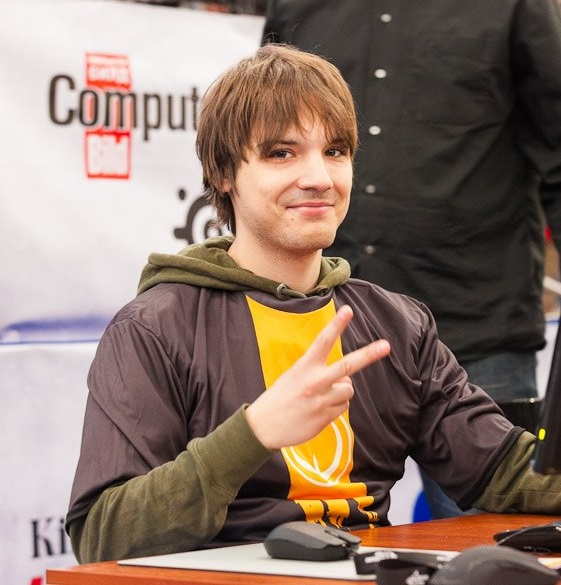

Personal information
- Name: Alexey Yanushevsky
- Born: May 17, 1990 (age 36)
- Nationality: Belarusian

Current team
- Team: Natus Vincere
- Game: Quake

Career information
- Games: Quake; Apex Legends
- Playing career: 2006–present
- Coaching career: 2019–2020

Team history
- 2006–2008: fnatic
- 2008–2012: Serious Gaming
- 2012: Millenium
- 2013-2014: Titan
- 2015: iGamerz
- 2016: ANOX
- 2017–2018: Virtus.pro
- 2018–2019: Nemiga Gaming
- 2019–2021: Natus Vincere

Alexey Yanushevsky (Алексе́й Анато́льевич Януше́вский) (born May 17, 1990), who also goes by the pseudonym "Cypher", resides in Minsk, and is a Belarusian professional player of the first person shooter series Quake. He has been actively competing in international Quake competitions since February 24, 2006. Cypher was most notably the first one to win the QuakeCon 1v1 tournament four times (in 2008, 2010, 2012, and 2014). He has been a champion of many other tournaments, including Electronic Sports World Cup, Intel Extreme Masters, Dreamhack and Asus Cups.

== Career ==
Originally a Quake III Arena player, Yanushevsky gained prominence with successes in Eastern European competitions in Quake IV shortly after the game's release. At the age of 16 he successfully qualified for the Electronic Sports World Cup in his native Belarus and defeated twofold world champion Russian Anton "Cooller" Singov in Moscow competitions. He subsequently entered the Electronic Sports World Cup and was considered a dark horse contestant at the world championship, Yanushevsky eventually reached the finals of the event, where he was defeated, taking second place at the event at an age at which he was too young to enter Cyberathlete Professional League or World Series of Video Games competitions.

Afterwards, Cypher was signed to professional video gaming team Fnatic. He made top five finishes at QuakeCon as well as the World Cyber Games. The following year he was one of the more successful players in international competition, taking 2nd and 3rd at two World Series of Video Games stops.

After the World Series of Video Games disbanded mid-season, Yanushevsky started focusing primarily on Quake III again, which eventually culminated in victory at the Electronic Sports World Cup Masters in July, 2008. He was then signed to the team Serious Gaming. On August 3, 2008, Yanushevsky won the Quake Live 1v1 Championship at QuakeCon 2008 his second major title. On August 27 he won the Electronic Sports World Cup 2008.

Cypher left Serious Gaming in December 2012. During this time he tried out the game Shootmania in Team Millenium, placing 3rd at the Cyberathlete Summit in Paris.

In December 2013, Cypher beat Shane "Rapha" Hendrixson to win DreamHack Winter 2013.

In July 2014 Cypher won his fourth QuakeCon, QuakeCon 2014, without losing a single map in the play-offs stage.

During 2015, Cypher tried out Counter Strike: Global Offensive and achieved a good level, but as he was looking for a team, Overwatch came out in beta and he decided to play that instead. During 2016 he played Overwatch and also achieved a good level (his team ANOX was top 6 in Europe during the ESL Overwatch Atlantic Showdown, and top 16 in the world during the Overwatch Open), but again he had to switch games as he was starting to find his form, this time because of the announcement of Quake Champions, due to come out in 2017.

== Notable achievements ==
=== 2017 ===
- – DreamHack Winter 2017 (Quake Champions) – Jönköping, Sweden
- – MediaMarkt LAN (Quake Champions) – Moscow, Russia

=== 2015 ===
- 6th – QuakeCon 2015 (Quake Live) – Dallas, Texas

=== 2014 ===
- – QuakeCon 2014 (Quake Live) – Dallas, Texas

=== 2013 ===
- – Dreamhack Winter 2013 (Quake Live) – Jonkoping, Sweden

=== 2012 ===
- – Dreamhack Winter 2012 (Quake Live) – Jonkoping, Sweden
- – Adroits LAN (Quake Live) – Enschede, Netherlands
- – QuakeCon 2012 (Quake Live) – Dallas, Texas
- - Cyberathlete Summit (ShootMania Storm) – Paris, France
- – Dreamhack Summer 2012 (Quake Live) – Jonkoping, Sweden

=== 2011 ===
- – Dreamhack Winter2011 (Quake Live) – Jonkoping, Sweden
- 9th – QuakeCon 2011 (Quake Live – Duel) – Dallas, Texas
- – QuakeCon 2011 (Quake Live – TDM) – Dallas, Texas
- – eSport Universe 2011 (Quake Live) Moscow, Russia
- – Dreamhack Summer 2011 (Quake Live) – Jonkoping, Sweden
- – ASUS Spring (Quake Live) – Kyiv, Ukraine
- – Ultimate Gaming Championship (Quake Live) – Lignano Sabbiadoro, Italy
- 7th – Intel Extreme Masters World Championship Finals (Quake Live) – Hanover, Germany
- 4th – Intel Extreme Masters European Championship Finals (Quake Live) – Kyiv, Ukraine

=== 2010 ===
- – ASUS Autumn Cup (Quake Live) – Kyiv, Ukraine
- – Dreamhack Winter Kasperksy Quakelive Championship (Quake Live) – Jonkoping, Sweden
- – Dreamhack Winter 2010 FNATICMSI BEAT IT FINALS (Quake Live) – Jonkoping, Sweden
- – ASUS Summer Cup (Quake Live) – Kyiv, Ukraine
- – QuakeCon 2010 (Quake Live) – Dallas, Texas
- 5th – Electronic Sports World Cup 2010 (Quake Live) – Paris, France
- – DreamHack Summer Kaspersky QUAKE LIVE Championships (Quake Live) – Jonkoping, Sweden
- – ASUS Spring Cup (Quake Live) – Moscow, Russia
- 4th – Intel Extreme Masters World Championship Finals (Quake Live) – Hannover, Germany
- – ASUS Winter Cup (Quake Live) – Moscow, Russia
- – Intel Extreme Masters European Championship Finals (Quake Live) – Cologne, Germany

=== 2009 ===
- – ASUS Autumn (Quake III) – Moscow, Russia
- – ASUS Summer (Quake III) – Moscow, Russia
- – ASUS Spring (Quake III) – Moscow, Russia
- – QuakeCon Masters Tournament (Quake Live) – Dallas, Texas
- – Intel Extreme Masters Global Challenge (Quake Live) – Dubai, United Arab Emirates
- 5th – Dreamhack Winter 2009 (Quake Live) – Jonkoping, Sweden

=== 2008 ===
- – ASUS Autumn (Quake III) – Moscow, Russia
- 4th – Electronic Sports World Cup Masters (Quake III) – Athens, Greece
- – 2008 Electronic Sports World Cup (Quake III) – San Jose, California
- – QuakeCon Intel QUAKE LIVE 1v1 Championship (Quake Live) – Dallas, Texas
- – Electronic Sport World Cup Masters (Quake III) – Paris, France
- 4th – ASUS Spring (Quake III) – Moscow, Russia
- – ASUS Winter (Quake III) – Moscow, Russia

=== 2007 ===
- – ASUS Autumn 1on1 (Quake III) – Moscow, Russia
- 4th – ASUS Autumn 2on2 (Quake III'') – Moscow, Russia
- – i32 Quake 4 tournament (Quake IV) – Newbury, United Kingdom
- 5th – ASUS Spring (Quake III) – Moscow, Russia
- 5th – World Series of Video Games (Quake IV) – Toronto, Ontario, Canada
- – World Series of Video Games (Quake IV) – Dallas, Texas
- – World Series of Video Games (Quake IV) – Louisville, Kentucky
- 5th – i30 Quake 4 tournament (Quake IV) – Newbury, United Kingdom

=== 2006 ===
- 4th – World Cyber Games All-stars 2on2 (Quake IV) – Monza, Italy
- 7th – World Cyber Games All-stars 1on1 (Quake IV) – Monza, Italy
- – ASUS Summer (Quake IV) – Moscow, Russia
- – ASUS Summer (Quake III) – Moscow, Russia
- – KODE5 Russia (Quake IV) – Moscow, Russia
- 5th – QuakeCon 2006 1on1 (Quake IV) – Dallas, Texas
- – Electronic Sports World Cup (Quake IV) – Paris, France
- – GigaGames (Quake IV) – Moscow, Russia
- 5th – ASUS Winter (Quake IV) – Moscow, Russia
- – ASUS Autumn (Quake III) – Moscow, Russia

=== Online ===
- – 125 FPS Sunday Cup #86 ($52)
- – 125 FPS Sunday Cup #83 ($52)
- – 125 FPS Sunday Cup #16 ($80)
- – 125 FPS Sunday Cup #15 ($80)
- – 125 FPS Sunday Cup #8 ($70)
- – 125 FPS Sunday Cup #5 ($70)
- – 125 FPS Season #19 (15,000 RUB)
- – 125 FPS Season #16 (15,352 RUB)
- – 125 FPS Season #13 (15,000 RUB)
- – 125 FPS Season #11 (15,000 RUB)
- – 125 FPS Season #10 ($420)
- – 125 FPS Season #9 ($526)
- – 125 FPS Season #8 ($465)
- – 125 FPS Season #3 (15,000 RUB)
- – 125 FPS Season #2 (15,000 RUB)
- – 125 FPS Cool Maps Cup ($100)
- – 125 FPS One Map Cup – Dismemberment ($180)
- – 125 FPS One Map Cup – House of Decay ($80)
- – 125 FPS One Map Cup – Delirium ($135)
- – 125 FPS One Map Cup – Fuse ($135)
- – Corsair Saturday Derby #4 (4,000 RUB)
- – Corsair Saturday Derby #3 (4,000 RUB)
- – Corsair Saturday Derby #2 (4,000 RUB)
- – Corsair Saturday Derby #1 (4,000 RUB)
- – FACEIT Road2QuakeCon 2015 ($1,500)
- – FACEIT Road2QuakeCon 2014 ($100)
- – FACEIT Spring Season Championship Finale 2014 ($250)
- – FACEIT Sunday Cup #64 ($100)
- – FACEIT Sunday Cup #56 ($100)
- – FACEIT Sunday Cup #55 ($100)
- – FACEIT Fall Season Championship Finale 2013 ($250)
- – FACEIT Sunday Cup #53 ($100)
- – FACEIT Sunday Cup #50 ($100)
- – FACEIT Sunday Cup #49 ($100)
- – FACEIT Sunday Cup #47 ($100)
- – FACEIT Sunday Cup #46 ($100)
- – FACEIT Sunday Cup #45 ($100)
- – FACEIT Sunday Cup #42 ($100)
- – FACEIT Sunday Cup #41 ($100)
- – FACEIT Winter Season Championship Finale 2013 ($250)
- – FACEIT Sunday Cup #23 ($100)
- – FACEIT Sunday Cup #11 ($100)
- – Q3God's Quake Live Cup #2 ($700)
- – ASUS Cup 2011 Final Battle of the Year (5,000 RUB)
- – ZOTAC QuakeLive Cup #144 (€100)
- – ZOTAC QuakeLive Cup #143 (€100)
- – ZOTAC QuakeLive Cup #142 (€100)
- – ZOTAC QuakeLive Cup #137 (€100)
- – ZOTAC QuakeLive Cup #135 (€100)
- – ZOTAC QuakeLive Cup #134 (€100)
- – ZOTAC QuakeLive Cup #128 (€100)
- – ZOTAC QuakeLive Cup #123 (€100)
- – ZOTAC QuakeLive Cup #122 (€100)
- – ZOTAC QuakeLive Cup #120 (€100)
- – ZOTAC QuakeLive Cup #119 (€100)
- – ZOTAC QuakeLive Cup #113 (€100)
- – ZOTAC QuakeLive Cup #112 (€100)
- – ZOTAC QuakeLive Cup #106 (€100)
- – ZOTAC QuakeLive Cup #94 (€100)
- – ZOTAC QuakeLive Cup #62 (€100)
- – ZOTAC QuakeLive Cup #24 (€100)
- – ZOTAC QuakeLive Cup #23 (€100)
- – G Data QuakeLive Cup #26 (€100)
- – G Data QuakeLive Cup #19 (€100)
- – G Data QuakeLive Cup #17 (€100)
- – G Data QuakeLive Cup #11 (€100)
- – G Data QuakeLive Cup #10 (€100)
- – G Data QuakeLive Cup #8 (€100)
- – ESL Major Series IV – Duel (€450)

== Awards ==
- 2010 – (Tek-9) Quake Live Player of the Year
