= Ataraxia (gamer) =

Former professional Smite player

Personal information
- Name: Nate Mark
- Nationality: Welsh, British

Career information
- Game: Smite
- Playing career: 2014–2020

Team history
- 2014: COGnitive Aquila
- 2015–2016: Titan
- 2016: Hungry For More
- 2017–2018: Obey Alliance
- 2019: Dignitas

Nathaniel "Nate" Mark, also known as Ataraxia, is a former professional Smite player who was the Hunter for Dignitas. He is one of the founding members of the team and previous other teams such as Obey Alliance, Cognitive Aquila, Agilitas, and Titan.

He hails from the town of Llanberis, Gwynedd in North Wales. He attended the University of Liverpool before discovering his interest in professional gaming and Smite, which he now trains and practices for full-time.

Nate claims to have gained an interest in Smite when his brother bought into the beta program of Smite and gave him a spare key. He has been with his team members since early 2012.

After winning second place in the 2015 Smite World Championships, Nate Mark became the highest paid professional gamer in the United Kingdom. Ataraxia became a member of Titan after the organization acquired the roster of COGnitive Aquila.
