= Rapha (gamer) =

American professional esports player

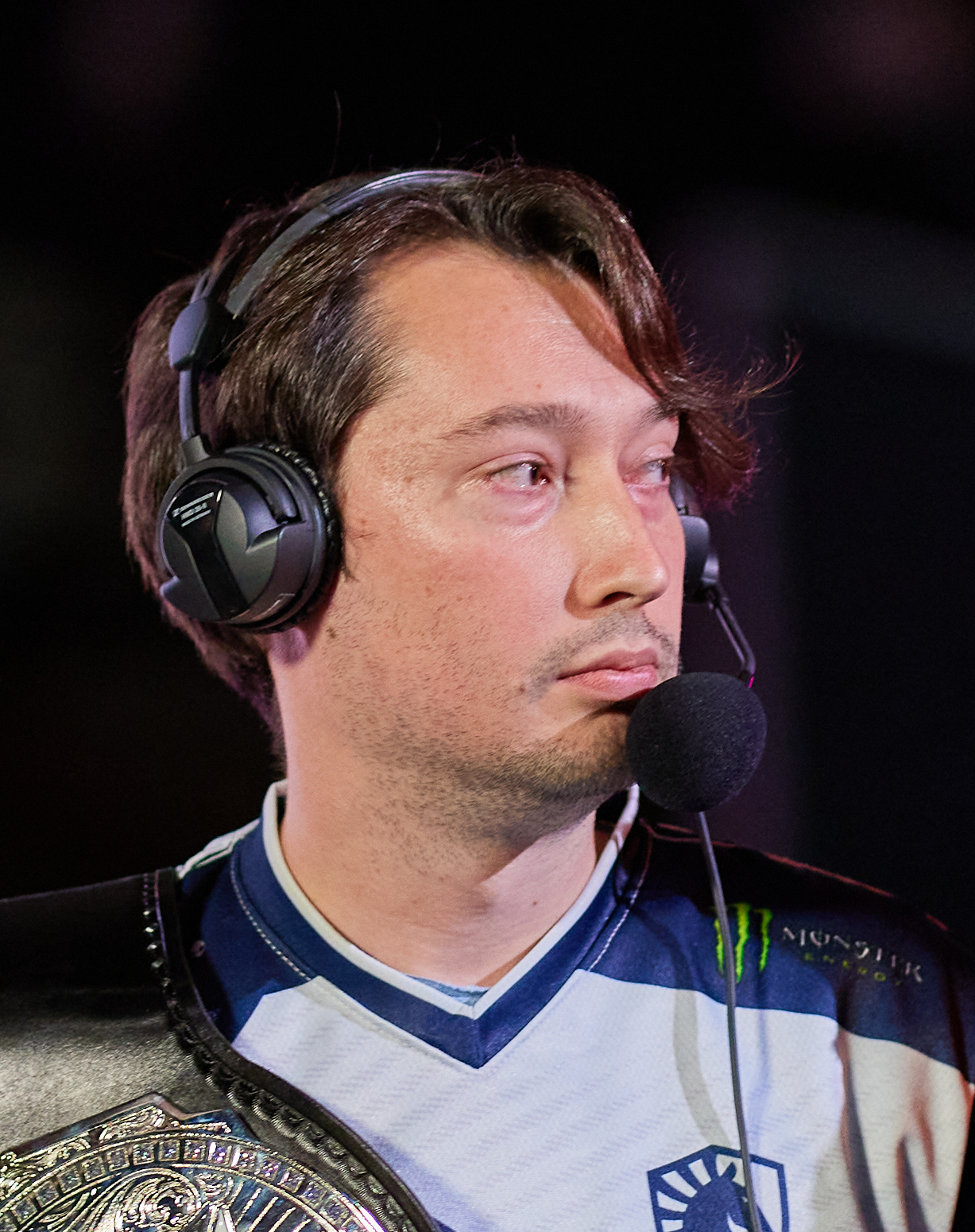
- Hendrixson in 2023

Personal information
- Name: Shane Hendrixson

Current team
- Team: Team Liquid
- Game: Quake

Career information
- Games: Quake; ShootMania; Overwatch
- Playing career: 2008–present

Team history
- 2008–2016: SK Gaming
- 2016–present: Team Liquid

Shane Hendrixson, also known by his pseudonym rapha, is an American professional esports Quake Live, Quake III Arena, ShootMania, Overwatch, and Quake Champions player for Team Liquid. Since he appeared in 2008, he has won sixteen major Quake duel tournaments and has placed top three in nearly every other participating tournament. Due to Hendrixson's consistent career performance and calculated style of play, he is widely considered to be the greatest Quake player of all time.

After four years of limited practice, able to play two to six weeks out of each year, Hendrixson joined SK Gaming in 2008. He immediately emerged as a top contender, taking third place at the Electronic Sports World Cup (ESWC) USA and grand finals. His calculated ability, illustrated by timing, predicting, and positioning, earned him the nickname "five steps ahead," which has been jokingly echoed by the community. At the end of his opening year, he took first place at the ESWC Masters of Athens and followed that achievement with two first place victories in 2009 and five more in 2010, securing his status as a leading player.

Red Bull included Hendrixson three times in their consideration of the five greatest Quake Live duel matches in history. During his career, he has won over $181,000 USD in cash and prizes from professional competitions worldwide.

== Biography ==
Brought to QuakeCon by his father at thirteen years of age, Hendrixson attended the annual event where he was inspired by the 2002 champion John "ZeRo4" Hill and fell in love with a game that had "the perfect balance of speed, tactics and skill all rolled into one." During his teenage years, he traveled between his divorced parents' houses and seldom played, for he lacked consistent access to both computer and Internet connection. As a result, he progressed slowly his first four years, playing a mere two to six weeks out of each, and since he could practice online only while living with his father, Hendrixson turned to watching point-of-view demos, particularly of his idols, John "ZeRo4" Hill and Anton "Cooller" Singov. When asked about his inability to train during his early years, Hendrixson stated, "I try not to think about it. I mean there's nothing I could have done to change it." He has also gone on to say, "It has kept me humble. Since I had so few opportunities, I have to make sure every event counts and that I give it my all."

In 2008, Hendrixson signed with the professional electronic sports organization SK Gaming, and he practiced often with teammate John "ZeRo4" Hill. After disappointing results at the Electronic Sports World Cup Masters of Paris where he failed to make it out of the group stage, Hendrixson returned home to prepare for the competition's grand finals. During this time, Hendrixson found that "something just clicked," propelling him to take third place and 4,000 USD at the grand finals. Months later, Hendrixson achieved his first major victory at the Electronic Sports World Cup Masters of Athens, where he defeated Sebastian "Spart1e" Siira, and solidified his status as a top player.

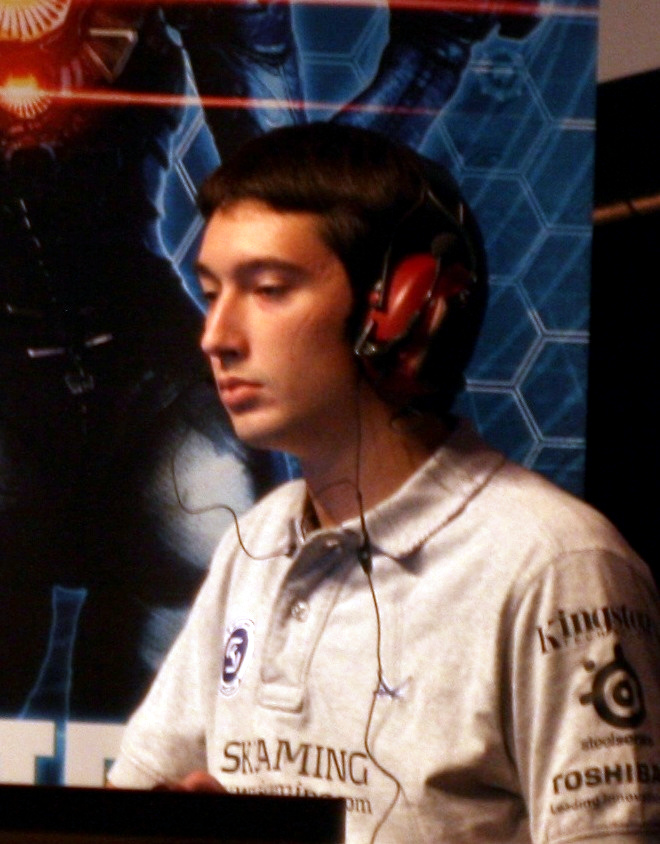
Hendrixson at Dreamhack Winter 2011

On November 6, 2012, SK Gaming announced Hendrixson as a player on the organization's new ShootMania team. He stated learning a new FPS game was "refreshing" and also "a nice change of pace" compared to mostly dueling in Quake Live.

In an interview with SteelSeries, Hendrixson imparted his post-retirement plans to study mobile electronics installation at university and throughout his appearances the following two years hinted at a possible halt in competitive play. Finally, in 2013, Hendrixson revealed a new statement regarding the subject of retirement:

I think I'll just look at it like 'Hey, if I have the time to go play in a big tournament and can prepare for it, I will, so I won't say that I'll 'retire'. I'm going to always leave the door open. I've accomplished quite a bit in Quake, and to me I don't really look at it like 'Okay, I've finally won this. Now I'm good.' I've always tried to take it one tournament at a time, and I'm always looking to win, and do more, and I think it'll always be that way. If you don't look at it that way it's so difficult to win against someone who really wants it more than you."

With the release of Overwatch, Hendrixson partnered with veteran Quake players cl0ck and ZeRo4 to participate in the game's first LAN tournament in North America. The group eventually disbanded, and Hendrixson shifted his focus to QuakeCon 2016. Following his victory, Team Liquid announced later that month that Hendrixson had joined as the team's sixth player alongside two other well-known Quake players, Tim "DaHanG" Fogarty and Andrew "id_" Trulli. Concerning motivation for playing Overwatch, Hendrixson echoed his previous statement on the team-oriented game ShootMania, stating that Overwatch was "fun, and coming from a mostly duel background in Quake—even though I have played team modes/games before—it's nice and refreshing to start something new and play a team game." When asked about his contributions to the team, he noted that many of his skills outside of playing Quake, such as studying demos to "understand and breakdown the mistakes in my gameplay and in the play of others," would allow the team to become more consistent and synergetic, but his biggest contribution laid in his "ability to read the game well and adapt accordingly while performing consistently."

He has now retired from competitive Overwatch to pursue his Quake career again in Quake Champions.

== Style of play ==
Hendrixson is most well known for his strong positioning, calm disposition, and ability to foresee his opponents' course of action minutes into the future, which Hendrixson attributes to his earlier years of playing basketball, saying it helped him develop the "ability to see the play unfold before it even happens and being aware of everything around you." In fact, Hendrixson believed any sport taught the importance of fundamentals. Noticing the parallel between sport and Quake, Hendrixson realized "how important it was to get the fundamentals down and master them, because when you're having an off day, you can always fall back on them. It becomes second nature to you." When questioned about his preferred style, Hendrixson said, "I know for myself that some games I've played, based just on the way I feel that day I've favored one [style] over the other. Almost always the strategy portion in my case." [sic] Hendrixson has described his biggest strengths to be "getting into the head of my opponent. Being able to be not just one but at times three, four, sometimes even five steps ahead of what they're going to do. And if they change something other than what I thought, being able to adapt quickly to the change and doing what I can to turn it in my favor. Sometimes my aim helps, but to me I aim well because of the way I think. It's not really a big reflex thing."

Following Hendrixson's defeat at DreamHack Winter 2012 to Sergey "Evil" Orekhov, who described Hendrixson's style of play:

Against Rapha, you need to know the things he starts his game with. He calculates a sequence of armors (spreads around in a circle within their proximity) and likes to take advantageous positions. He plays very standard, dry game, without special aggressive moves or focus on specific weapon(s). We rarely see him hitting four rails in a row. More likely he will use rocket-shaft combo and play safe. He seems to be like Cooller in this case. This is very effective against weak players, but against strong it is very predictable.

— Sergey "Evil" Orekhov

The year following this statement, Hendrixson faced Sergey at QuakeCon 2013, and in response to his and other players' styles, Hendrixson explained, "I'm not going to worry about how he's playing or anyone else. Like always I'm just going to look at the strengths and weaknesses of who I have to play and from there just worry about myself and try to make sure I'm giving myself the best chance to win no matter who I have to play. The only thing I can really control is myself and how I'm playing. I try not to think too much about how good someone else is at the time. I just respect what they bring to the table and try my best to overcome it."

Hendrixson stated: "I think if you're trying to do anything professionally you need to aim to be the best. If not, you'll sell yourself short, which is why you shouldn't be in the mindset of just trying to finish in the Top8 or Top4. You need to strive to be the best because that's what the best do." Before tournaments, Hendrixson describes himself as "nervous" and "anxious," but when finally sitting down and getting into the game, "all of that [melts] away." Though he has even noted nervousness as "being helpful", he feels "there's no reason to feel down or let pressure get to you. I can't do anything about the previous games anyway."

== Selected championships ==
All winnings are in USD.

=== Quake Live ===
Year	Competition	Venue	Position	Event	Notes
2016	QuakeCon Duel Masters Championship	Hilton Anatole in Dallas, Texas	1st	Duel	$12,000
2015	QuakeCon Tri-Masters Grand-Master Duel Finals	Hilton Anatole in Dallas, Texas	1st	Duel	$8000
2015	QuakeCon Tri-Masters Duel Division	Hilton Anatole in Dallas, Texas	1st	Duel(Team)	$8000. With Team Found 'Em.
2014	QuakeCon PCPartPicker Open	Hilton Anatole in Dallas, Texas	2nd	Capture the Flag	$2,000. With the team WELP, who additionally won the showmatch.
2013	DreamHack Winter	Elmia in Jönköping, Sweden	2nd	Duel	$3,841
2013	QuakeCon Intel Masters	Hilton Anatole in Dallas, Texas	1st	Duel	$9,000
2013	QuakeCon 3v3 Open	Hilton Anatole in Dallas, Texas	1st	Clan Arena	$1,000. With the team The Dream
2012	DreamHack Winter	Elmia in Jönköping, Sweden	2nd	Duel	$3,018
2012	QuakeCon Championship	Hilton Anatole in Dallas, Texas	1st	Capture the Flag	$1,000. With the team ROOF
2012	DreamHack Summer	Elmia in Jönköping, Sweden	1st	Duel	$4,314
2011	DreamHack Winter	Elmia in Jönköping, Sweden	2nd	Duel	$2,137
2011	QuakeCon Invitational Masters Championship	Hilton Anatole in Dallas, Texas	1st	Duel	$8,000
2011	DreamHack Summer	Elmia in Jönköping, Sweden	2nd	Duel	$1,570
2011	Ultimate Gaming Championship	Lignano Sabbiadoro, Italy	2nd	Duel	$1,600
2011	Intel Extreme Masters Season V World Championship Finals	CeBIT in Hanover, Germany	1st	Duel	$8,500
2010	FnaticMSI PLAY BEAT IT	Elmia in Jönköping, Sweden	1st	Duel	$6,000
2010	Intel Extreme Masters Season V American Championship Finals	New York, New York	1st	Duel	$3,000
2010	Intel Extreme Masters Season V Global Challenge: Cologne	Gamescom at Koelnmesse in Cologne, Germany	2nd	Duel	$1,700
2010	Big Bang	Ottumwa, Iowa	1st	Duel	$800
2010	Electronic Sports World Cup	Disneyland Park in Paris, France	1st	Duel	$8,000
2010	Intel Extreme Masters Season IV World Championship Finals	CeBIT in Hanover, Germany	1st	Duel	$10,000
2009	Intel Extreme Masters Season IV American Championship Finals	New York, New York	2nd	Duel	$1,500
2009	Intel Extreme Masters Season IV Global Challenge Dubai	Dubai, United Arab Emirates	1st	Duel	$3,000
2009	Intel Extreme Masters Season IV Pro/Am Challenge	Gamescom at Koelnmesse in Cologne, Germany	1st	Duel	$1,000
2009	QuakeCon Masters Championship	Gaylord Texan Resort Hotel & Convention Center in Grapevine, Texas	1st	Duel	$14,000
2008	QuakeCon Capture the Flag Championship	Hilton Anatole in Dallas, Texas	1st	Capture the Flag	With the team billymaysdaze

=== Quake III Arena ===
Year	Competition	Venue	Position	Event	Notes
2008	Electronic Sports World Cup Masters of Athens	Athens, Greece	1st	Duel	$7,500

=== ShootMania ===
Year	Competition	Venue	Position	Event	Notes
2012	Curse Invitational Tournament	Online	1st	Elite	$1,000
