= Multiplay =

Video game server company

- Type: Subsidiary
- Founded: 1997; 29 years ago
- Headquarters: Cardiff, Wales, United Kingdom
- Key people: Tom Daniel (CEO); Larry Rye (General Manager)
- Services: Game Server Hosting; Live Operations
- Parent: Rocket Science Group
- Website: multiplay.com

Multiplay is a game server hosting business owned by Rocket Science Group. It began as Multiplay (UK) Ltd., a UK-based company incorporated in May 1997. Originally founded as a gaming events company, it also specialised in dedicated game servers, working directly with game studios and publishers.

Multiplay was sold to GAME in 2015. The digital half of the business was further sold to Unity Technologies in 2017. In 2026, Unity ended direct support for its Multiplay Game Server Hosting service, and operation of the service passed to Rocket Science Group.

== History ==
Multiplay started as a LAN event organiser in 1999 hosting their first event "Insomnia" in conjunction with Wireplay. The event underwent a name change to i-series for their second event "i2" due to splitting with Wireplay.

On 2 December 2013 Multiplay announced the Insomnia event would move to the Ricoh Arena for i51 onwards citing continued growth. The event moved again for i56 onwards, this time to the Birmingham NEC, the UK's largest exhibition centre.

On 3 January 2019 Multiplay notified users that they would be ending their Community Servers. They closed down Community servers on 28 February 2019.

Following its sale to Unity, the server hosting business continued as Multiplay Game Server Hosting. Unity ended direct support for the service on 31 March 2026 and deprecated it the following day, with an exception for customers who had committed to migrating to Multiplay by Rocket Science. Rocket Science Group operates the service using hosting technology licensed from Unity.

== Events ==
=== Insomnia Gaming Festival ===
Insomnia Gaming Festival is a large-scale gaming event with a professional Main Stage, an Expo Hall and a large-scale LAN (Local Area Network) event which is the largest LAN in the UK. Originally this was a PC gaming only event, but in recent years has incorporated console gamers. The series of events, referred to as the ‘iSeries’ are sequentially numbered and run three times a year, typically with one around Easter, with the others usually hosted in August and November. The original events were hosted at Newbury Racecourse in the United Kingdom from i5 to i33 when the venue was relocated to Stoneleigh Park for i34. From i38 to i42 the event returned to Newbury. The home of i43 to i50 events was The Telford International Centre and from i51 to i55 it took place at the Ricoh Arena in Coventry. i56 - i72 were held at the NEC in Birmingham due to its growth and popularity. These events have evolved with professional competitive tournaments and large exhibition halls. Popular segments of the festival include main stage shows by special guests, often YouTube personalities, as well as evening entertainment such as the "World Famous Insomnia Pub Quiz". Sometimes referred to as "The Glastonbury of Gaming", Insomnia continues to be the biggest festival of its kind in the UK. The first Insomnia: Insomnia99 was a 300-player event. In 2020, i66 and i67 were cancelled due to the outbreak of the Coronavirus Pandemic. The event resumed with i68 in April 2022. In 2024, after i72, the event was shut down.

=== Minecon 2012 ===
Multiplay were approached by Sandbox/Survival game creators Mojang to produce their fan festival Minecon, celebrating the online world of Minecraft. The convention was held in Disneyland Paris in November 2012 and attracted over 4,500 visitors.

=== World Cyber Games ===
Multiplay UK have also hosted the United Kingdom's national qualifiers for the World Cyber Games at their I-Series events for a number of years, working on behalf of Samsung Electronics UK for the 2004, 2006, 2007 and 2008 games. For the 2009 games Multiplay have been confirmed as the strategic partner by global organiser International Cyber Marketing.

=== IPL 4 UK Qualifiers ===
Multiplay UK's i44 event in Telford hosted the IGN Pro League 4 UK Qualifiers (IPL 4 UK) resulting in the biggest eSports event the UK has ever hosted. Over 2,500,000 viewers watched the proceedings with TotalBiscuit and Apollo commentating on top Starcraft 2 professional players like White Ra, Stephano and Grubby. $20,000 prize pool was given out to the top 8 players, with the French player Stephano taking gold.

=== ESET UK Masters ===
Multiplay also hosted the finals for the ESET UK Masters in 2012/2013 which plays host to the biggest prize pool for a Starcraft 2 tournament sponsored by a UK organization at an esports event (£10,000 per event). This is set to take part for all 3 iSeries events in 2013 making it one of the most ambitious eSports projects hosted within the UK.
