= Hilton Anatole =

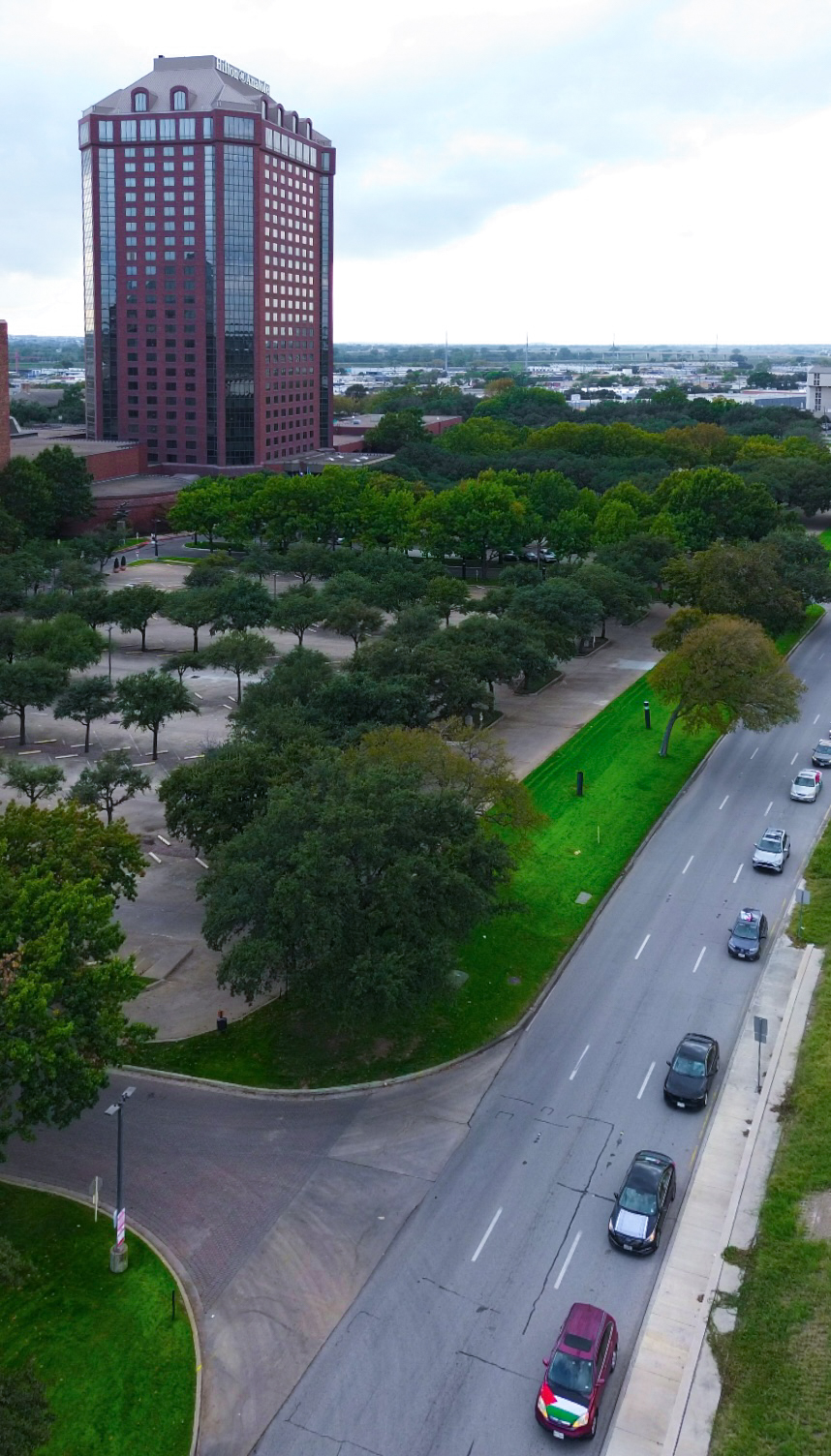
- Hilton Anatole in 2024
- Former names: Loews Anatole (1979-1995); Wyndham Anatole (1995-2005)

General information
- Status: Completed
- Type: Hotel
- Architectural style: Post-modernism
- Location: 2201 Stemmons Freeway; Dallas, Texas
- Coordinates: 32.8002°N 96.8286°W
- Completed: 1979 (low-rise); 1983 (high-rise)
- Opening: 1979 (low-rise); 1983 (high-rise)
- Cost: US$58 million
- Owner: Crow Holdings
- Operator: Hilton

Height
- Roof: 96.3 m (316 ft)

Technical details
- Floor count: 13 (low-rise); 28 (high-rise)
- Lifts/elevators: 22

Other information
- Number of rooms: 1,606

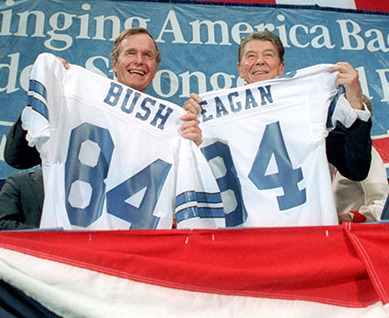
George H. W. Bush and Ronald Reagan attend a welcoming ceremony at the hotel during the 1984 RNC

The Hilton Anatole is a Dallas hotel at 2201 Stemmons Freeway in the Market Center district just north of downtown Dallas, Texas. Featuring 1,610 guest rooms, it is one of the largest hotels in the South and is a major convention and meeting facility. Over 1,000 art objects, including a casting of Riding Into the Sunset and two sections of the Berlin Wall, are located throughout the resort setting. The hotel previously featured the five-star Nana Restaurant, but it closed in May 2012 due to decreased demand for fine dining restaurants and was replaced with a high-energy steak house, SĒR (pronounced sear).

The hotel is notable for having a propeller salvaged from the RMS Lusitania on display.

== History ==
The Loews Anatole Hotel opened in 1979 with 1,000 rooms in two pyramid-topped buildings. It was developed by Trammell Crow, as part of his huge Dallas Market Center complex. The hotel was named after a restaurant Crow favored in Copenhagen., In 1981, a 27-story tower containing 700 more rooms, a ballroom, meeting space, shops, a health club, and a seven-acre garden was added to the hotel. In 1984, the hotel served as the headquarters for the Reagan-Bush '84 campaign staff during the Republican National Convention in Dallas.

On October 11, 1990, the Chantilly Ballroom of the Loews Anatole hosted a luncheon of the Greater Dallas Crime Commission that would turn out to have a major impact on the course of Texas politics. Republican Gubernatorial nominee Clayton Williams, incensed by hard-hitting television ads by State Treasurer and Democratic Gubernatorial nominee Ann Richards, confronted Richards at her seat at the head table shortly before the luncheon speaking began, in full view of television cameras, telling a companion "watch this" and then going up to Richards saying "I'm here to. . . to call you a liar today", with a stunned Richards then standing up and patting Williams on his left arm and saying "Aww, I'm sorry", with Williams then saying "Well no, that's what you are, you lied about me, you lied about (former Governor) Mark White (Texas politician), you lied about (State Attorney General) Jim Mattox, (inaudible), I'm going to finish this deal and you can count on it." Richards then said "Well, I'll tell you what Clayton", and extended her hand out toward him but Williams gave her a contemptuous wave of his right hand and said "I don't want to shake your hand" and greeted someone else at the table on the way to his seat there. Williams, already losing ground in the race after having a lead in polls over fifteen points, lost even more after a gaffe widely shown both in Texas and nationally and perceived by many as discourteous and unchivalrous by a candidate who regularly cultivated a cowboy image. Williams would commit more public relations blunders before the election and lost to Richards 49.5 to 46.9% despite the earlier wide polling lead and also despite outspending Richards - bloodied by a nasty Democratic primary and runoff while Williams easily coasted to a 60% plus Republican primary win - about $21 to 12 million. To date, Williams is the last Republican nominee to lose a Texas Gubernatorial election.

In 1995 Wyndham Hotels, a company owned by the Crow family, took over management of the hotel, renaming it the Wyndham Anatole Hotel and expanding the meeting facilities. It was the largest hotel in the South until the opening of the Sheraton Dallas Hotel in 1998.

In 2005, Hilton Hotels assumed management and the hotel was renamed the Hilton Anatole. Crow Holdings and Hilton invested over $185 million in renovations to the guest rooms, meeting space, restaurants & bars, and a new center Atrium. The Anatole is rated Four Diamonds by AAA Travel.

As of 2011, the Anatole had been host five times to QuakeCon, the largest LAN party in North America. The Anatole also hosts the annual Crystal Charity Ball, one of the largest single night charitable events in the United States. The Anatole is also the site for A-Kon, the longest running anime convention in the US.

In 2014, Hilton announced the opening of Geppetto's Marionette Theater as a collaborative venture with Le Theatre de Marionette.

JadeWaters, a $20 million seasonal resort pool complex, opened in late July 2016 utilizing 3 acres of the Anatole's seven acre park area. JadeWaters features a lazy river, two 180 foot water slides, a children's area, 46 pieces of art, a full-service restaurant and a large year-round leisure pool. It is an exclusive amenity for hotel guests

The Hilton Anatole was featured in several episodes of Season 13 of The Bachelorette.

The Hilton Anatole hosted auditions for the first season of American Idol in 2002.

In 2021, the hotel was host to the Conservative Political Action Conference, and featured prominent conservative speakers, including US senators and congressional representatives, Republican governors and media personalities. The keynote speech was given by President Donald Trump.

== Anatole General Managers ==
2003-2011: Marc Messina

2011-2016: Harold Rapoza

2016-2017: Mike McGilligan

2017-2023: Robert Watson

2023-present: Bruce Roy
