= Intel Extreme Masters =

Series of international esports tournaments

- Sport: Esports; Counter-Strike; StarCraft II
- Founded: 2007
- Country: Worldwide
- Most recent champions: Counter-Strike: Team Falcons (IEM Cologne 2026); StarCraft II: Joona "Serral" Sotala (Katowice 2024)
- Most titles: Counter-Strike: Fnatic
- Sponsors: Intel, Acer Predator, 1xBet, Paysafecard, DHL, MTN Dew AMP Game Fuel
- Website: www.intelextrememasters.com

The Intel Extreme Masters (IEM) is a series of international esports tournaments held around the world. These Electronic Sports League (ESL) sanctioned events, sponsored by Intel, as of 2025 currently host events in Counter-Strike 2. Other game titles were hosted in the past, including StarCraft II and League of Legends. The body that owns the league is Savvy Games Group. The League has operated 17 seasons as of 2023. The highest tier of events, known as Masters Championships, are held in the summer in Cologne, Germany and in the new year in Poland, offering the most prize money. Other events, known as Masters events, are held in numerous cities around the globe, which have included Dallas, Shanghai and Sydney.

== History ==
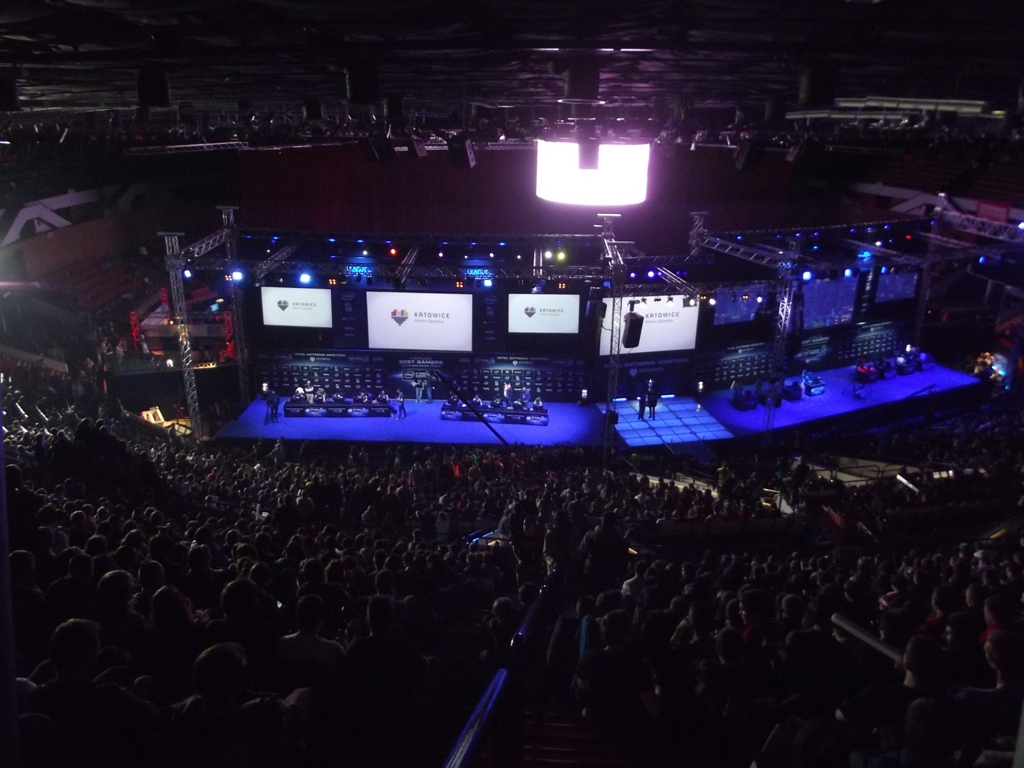
Intel Extreme Masters Katowice 2013

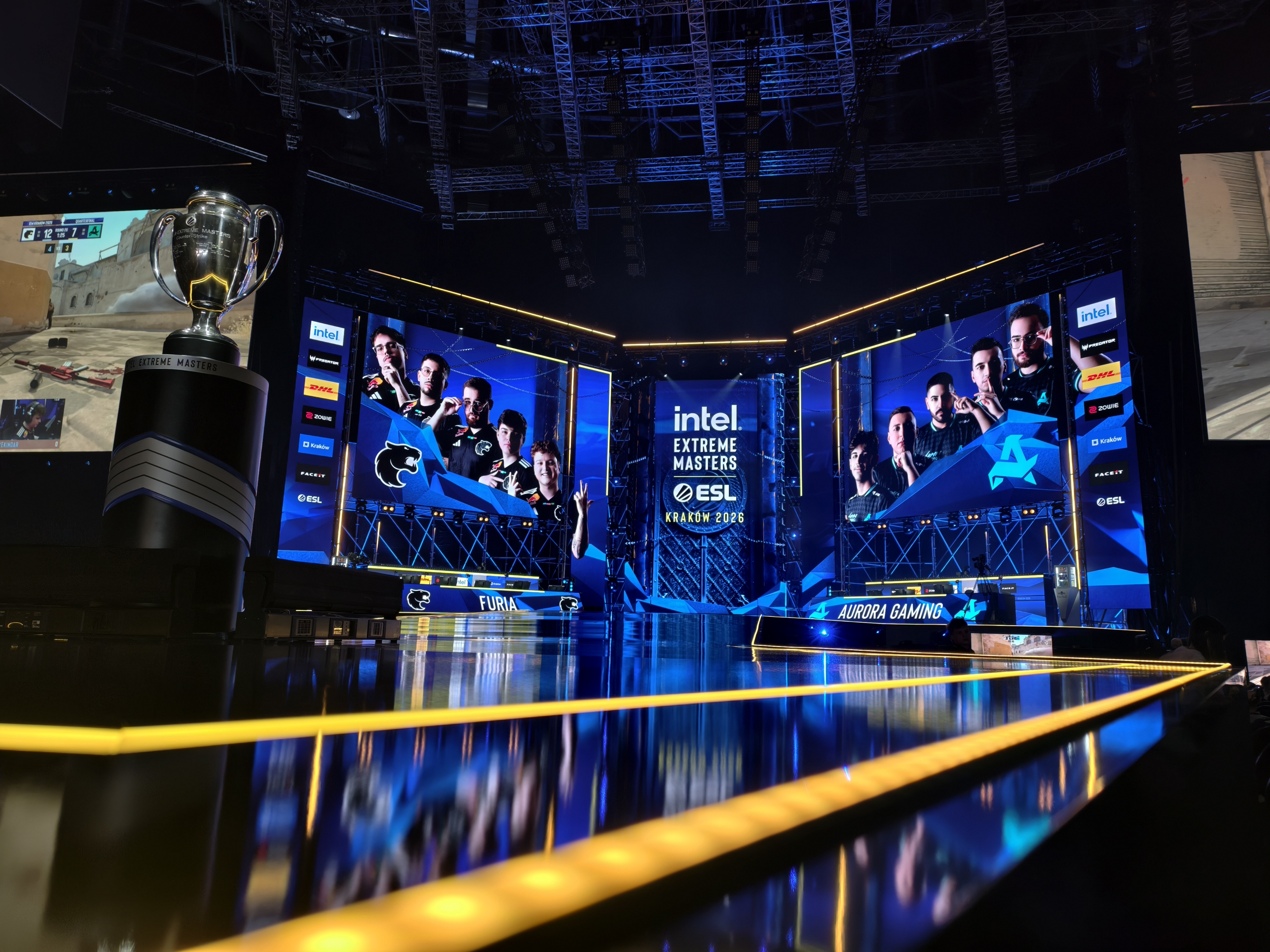
Intel Extreme Masters Kraków 2026 tournament stage

The Intel Extreme Masters are a product of the ESL. The first tournament was hosted at Games Convention 2006 under the name "Core 2 Extreme Masters". After the Intel sponsored European tournament saw room for expansion outside of Europe, especially in North American markets, Intel provided funds for a worldwide tournament, billing it as the Intel Extreme Masters. In 2007, when established, the IEM established a format of many smaller qualifying events, leading up to a large final event that is held at CeBIT. All of the Grand Finals have been held at CeBIT. Starting in 2008, the Tournament was billed as being worldwide, boasting participants from Europe, North America, and Asia. Although Counterstrike 1.6 was the only game offered in the first season, the variety of games has increased greatly, to the four that were offered during Season 5. World of Warcraft was offered during Season 4, but was dropped for Season 5. The Season 5 Finals was held at CeBIT 2011 and included a US$130,000 prize pool.

Games hosted
Game	Events hosted	Seasons
Counter-Strike	24	I-VI
Warcraft III: Reign of Chaos	7	I-IV
World of Warcraft	11	III-IV
Quake Live	10	IV-V
Defense of the Ancients	2	IV-V
Warcraft III: The Frozen Throne	1	V
StarCraft II	14	V-VII
League of Legends	29	V-XI
Counter-Strike: Global Offensive	35	VI-2023
StarCraft II: Heart of the Swarm	13	VIII-X
Hearthstone: Heroes of Warcraft	2	VIII-IX
Heroes of the Storm	1	X
StarCraft II: Legacy of the Void	14	X-2022, 2024
Overwatch	1	XI
PlayerUnknown's Battlegrounds	1	XII
Counter-Strike 2	18	2023-

== IEM seasons ==
=== Season I ===
Event	Dates	Game	Winner	Ref
World Championship	15-18 March 2007	Counter-Strike	Team Pentagram	
World Championship	15-18 March 2007	Warcraft III: Reign of Chaos	Yoan "ToD" Merlo	

=== Season II ===
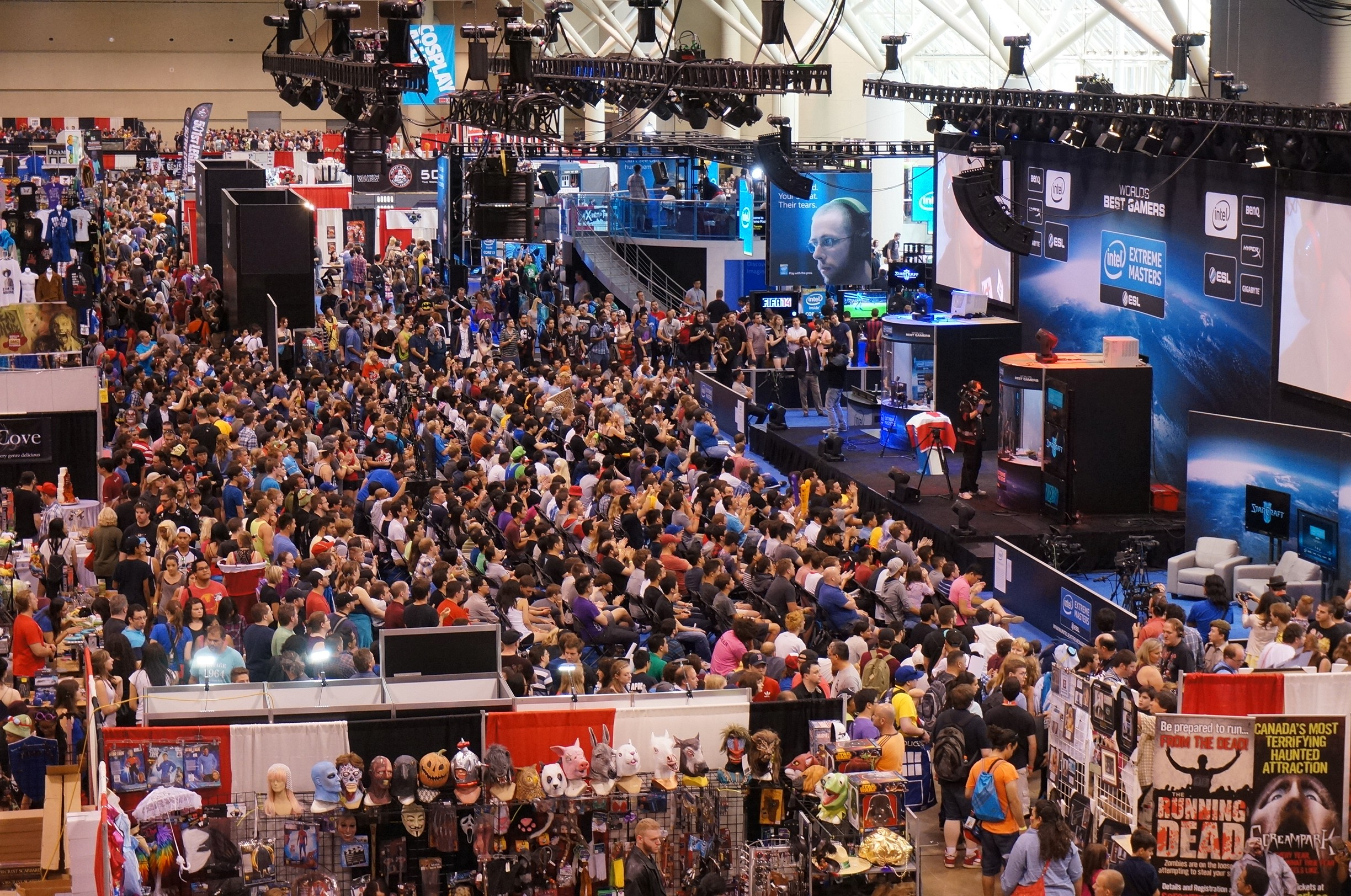
Fan Expo at Intel Extreme Masters Toronto 2014

Event	Dates	Game	Winner	Ref
Los Angeles	6-9 March 2008	Counter-Strike	FnaticRC	
Los Angeles	6-9 March 2008	Warcraft III: Reign of Chaos	June "Lyn" Park	
World Championship	6-9 March 2008	Counter-Strike	Mousesports	
World Championship	6-9 March 2008	Warcraft III: Reign of Chaos	June "Lyn" Park	

=== Season III ===
Event	Dates	Game	Winner	Ref
Games Convention		Warcraft III: Reign of Chaos	Nihilum Plasma	
Los Angeles		Counter-Strike	SK Gaming	
Los Angeles		World of Warcraft	x6tence	
Montreal	17-19 October 2008	Counter-Strike	Fnatic	
Montreal	17-19 October 2008	World of Warcraft	SK Gaming	
Global		Counter-Strike	Mousesports	
Asian WoW	13-16 November 2008	Counter-Strike	e-STRO	
Asian WoW	13-16 November 2008	World of Warcraft	H O N	
Asian WoW	13-16 November 2008	Warcraft III: Reign of Chaos	Manuel "Grubby" Schenkhuizen	
European		Counter-Strike	mTw	
European		World of Warcraft	iNNERFiRE	
American		Counter-Strike	Made in Brazil	
American		World of Warcraft	Trade Chat	
Asian CS1.6	16-18 January 2009	Counter-Strike	wNv Teamwork	
Asian CS1.6	16-18 January 2009	Warcraft III: Reign of Chaos	Li "Sky" Xiaofeng	
World Championship	3-8 March 2009	Counter-Strike	fnatic	
World Championship	3-8 March 2009	World of Warcraft	H O N	

=== Season IV ===
Event	Dates	Game	Winner	Ref
GamesCom	20-23 August 2009	Counter-Strike	Mousesports	
GamesCom	20-23 August 2009	Quake Live	Shane "rapha" Hendrixson	
GamesCom	20-23 August 2009	World of Warcraft	Ensidia	
Chengdu	1-3 October 2009	Counter-Strike	SK Gaming	
Chengdu	1-3 October 2009	Defense of the Ancients	For The Dream (ex-LGD)	
Chengdu	1-3 October 2009	Warcraft III: Reign of Chaos	Lu "Fly100%" Weiliang	
Dubai		Counter-Strike	Fnatic	
Dubai		Quake Live	Shane "rapha" Hendrixson	
European		Counter-Strike	Mousesports	
European		Quake Live	Alexey "Cypher" Yanushevsky	
European		World of Warcraft	SK Gaming Sansibar	
American		Counter-Strike	compLexity	
American		Quake Live	Tim "DaHanG" Fogarty	
American		World of Warcraft	compLexity Black	
Asian		Counter-Strike	WeMade FOX	
Asian		Quake Live	Fan "Jibo" Zhibo	
Asian		World of Warcraft	Button Bashers	
World Championship	2-6 March 2010	Counter-Strike	Natus Vincere	
World Championship	2-6 March 2010	Quake Live	Shane "rapha" Hendrixson	
World Championship	2-6 March 2010	World of Warcraft	Evil Geniuses	

=== Season V ===
Event	Dates	Game	Winner	Ref
Shanghai		Counter-Strike	fnatic	
Shanghai		Warcraft III: The Frozen Throne	June "Lyn" Park	
Shanghai		Defense of the Ancients	EHOME	
Cologne		StarCraft II	Stefan "MorroW" Andersson — Mousesports	
Cologne		Quake Live	k1llsen	
American		Counter-Strike	compLexity	
American		Quake Live	Shane "rapha" Hendrixson	
American		StarCraft II	Jian "Fenix" Morayra Alejo — fnatic	
European		Counter-Strike	fnatic	
European		Quake Live	Anton "Cooller" Singov	
European		StarCraft II	Jeffrey "SjoW" Brusi — Team Dignitas	
World Championship	1-5 March 2011	Counter-Strike	Natus Vincere	
World Championship	1-5 March 2011	Quake Live	Shane "rapha" Hendrixson	
World Championship	1-5 March 2011	StarCraft II	Jung "AcE" Woo-Seo — Team StarTale	
World Championship	1-5 March 2011	League of Legends Invitational	myRevenge	

=== Season VI ===
Event	Dates	Game	Winner	Ref
Cologne		League of Legends	Counter Logic Gaming	
Cologne		StarCraft II	Lee "PuMa" Ho-Joon — Evil Geniuses	
Guangzhou		League of Legends	World Elite	
Guangzhou		StarCraft II	Greg "IdrA" Fields — Evil Geniuses	
Guangzhou		Counter-Strike	fnatic	
New York City		League of Legends	fnatic	
New York City		StarCraft II	Park "DongRaeGu" Soo-Ho — Complexity Gaming & Team MvP	
New York City		Counter-Strike: Global Offensive	SK Gaming	
Kyiv		League of Legends	Moscow 5	
Kyiv		StarCraft II	Moon "MMA" Sung-Won — Team SlayerS	
Kyiv		Counter-Strike	Natus Vincere	
São Paulo		StarCraft II	Kim "viOLet" Dong-Hwan — Team Empire	
World Championship	6-10 March 2012	League of Legends	Moscow 5	
World Championship	6-10 March 2012	StarCraft II	Jang "MC" Min-Chul— SK Gaming	
World Championship	6-10 March 2012	Counter-Strike: Global Offensive	ESC Gaming	

=== Season VII ===
Event	Dates	Game	Winner	Ref
Gamescom		League of Legends	Moscow Five	
Gamescom		StarCraft II	Jung "Mvp" Jong-Hyun — Incredible Miracle	
Singapore		League of Legends	MeetYourMakers	
Singapore		StarCraft II	Ju "Sting" Hoon — Western Wolves	
Cologne		League of Legends	SK Telecom T1	
Katowice		League of Legends	Gambit Gaming (ex-M5)	
Katowice		StarCraft II	Kang "First" Hyun-Woo — Incredible Miracle	
Brazil		League of Legends	Incredible Miracle	
World Championship		League of Legends	CJ Entus Blaze	
World Championship		StarCraft II	Choi "YoDa" Byung-Hyun — Incredible Miracle	

=== Season VIII ===
Intel Extreme Masters Season VIII

Event	Dates	Game	Winner	Runner-up	Ref
Shanghai	25–28 July 2013	League of Legends	Team WE	Invictus Gaming	
Shanghai	25–28 July 2013	StarCraft II: Heart of the Swarm	Revival	Oz	
New York	10–13 October 2013	StarCraft II: Heart of the Swarm	Life	NaNiwa	
Cologne	23–24 November 2013	League of Legends (Pro)	Gambit Gaming	Fnatic	
Cologne	23–24 November 2013	League of Legends (Amateur)	Copenhagen Wolves	Ninjas in Pyjamas	
Singapore	28 November – 1 December 2013	League of Legends	Invictus Gaming	CJ Entus Frost	
Singapore	28 November – 1 December 2013	StarCraft II: Heart of the Swarm	herO	san	
São Paulo	28 January – 1 February 2014	League of Legends	Millenium	paiN Gaming	
São Paulo	28 January – 1 February 2014	StarCraft II: Heart of the Swarm	herO	MC	
Cologne	13–16 February 2014	StarCraft II: Heart of the Swarm	HerO	Polt	
World Championship Katowice	13–16 March 2014				
World Championship Katowice	13–16 March 2014	Hearthstone: Heroes of Warcraft	Gnimsh	Artosis	
World Championship Katowice	13–16 March 2014	League of Legends	KT Rolster Bullets	Fnatic	
World Championship Katowice	13–16 March 2014	StarCraft II: Heart of the Swarm	sOs	herO	

=== Season IX ===
Intel Extreme Masters Season IX

Event	Dates	Game	Winner	Runner-up	Ref
Shenzhen	16–20 July 2014	Hearthstone: Heroes of Warcraft	Amaz	Azeri	
Shenzhen	16–20 July 2014	League of Legends	Team WE	EDward Gaming	
Shenzhen	16–20 July 2014	StarCraft II: Heart of the Swarm	TaeJa	Solar	
Toronto	28–31 August 2014	StarCraft II: Heart of the Swarm	Flash	Zest	
San Jose	6–7 December 2014	League of Legends	Cloud9	Unicorns of Love	
San Jose	6–7 December 2014	StarCraft II: Heart of the Swarm	herO	Rain	
Cologne	18–21 December 2014	League of Legends	Gambit Gaming	Counter Logic Gaming	
Taipei	28 January – 1 February 2015	League of Legends	yoe Flash Wolves	Taipei Assassins	
Taipei	28 January – 1 February 2015	StarCraft II: Heart of the Swarm	Life	Maru	
World Championship Katowice	12–15 March 2015	Counter-Strike: Global Offensive	Fnatic	Ninjas in Pyjamas	
World Championship Katowice	12–15 March 2015	League of Legends	Team SoloMid	Team WE	
World Championship Katowice	12–15 March 2015	StarCraft II: Heart of the Swarm	Zest	Trap	

=== Season X ===
Intel Extreme Masters Season X

Event	Dates	Game	Winner	Runner-up	Ref
Shenzhen	16–20 July 2015	Heroes of the Storm	MVP Black	Virtus.pro	
Shenzhen	16–20 July 2015	StarCraft II: Heart of the Swarm	Classic	PartinG	
Gamescom	5–9 August 2015	Counter-Strike: Global Offensive	Team EnVyUs	Team SoloMid	
Gamescom	5–9 August 2015	StarCraft II: Heart of the Swarm	INnoVation	soO	
San Jose	21–22 November 2015	Counter-Strike: Global Offensive	Natus Vincere	Team SoloMid	
San Jose	21–22 November 2015	League of Legends	Origen	Counter Logic Gaming	
Cologne	18–20 December 2015	League of Legends	ESC Ever	Qiao Gu Reapers	
Taipei	29 January – 2 February 2016	Counter-Strike: Global Offensive	The MongolZ	Renegades	
Taipei	29 January – 2 February 2016	StarCraft II: Legacy of the Void	sOs	ByuN	
World Championship Katowice	4–6 March 2016	Counter-Strike: Global Offensive	Fnatic	Luminosity Gaming	
World Championship Katowice	4–6 March 2016	League of Legends	SK Telecom T1	Fnatic	
World Championship Katowice	4–6 March 2016	StarCraft II: Legacy of the Void	Polt	Snute	

=== Season XI ===
Intel Extreme Masters Season XI

Event	Dates	Game	Winner	Runner-up	Ref
Shanghai	28–31 July 2016	StarCraft II: Legacy of the Void	uThermal	Neeb	
Oakland	19–20 November 2016	Counter-Strike: Global Offensive	Ninjas in Pyjamas	SK Gaming	
Oakland	19–20 November 2016	League of Legends	Unicorns Of Love	Flash Wolves	
Gyeonggi	17–18 December 2016	League of Legends	Samsung Galaxy	Kongdoo Monster	
Gyeonggi	17–18 December 2016	Overwatch	LuxuryWatch Red	Lunatic-Hai	
Gyeonggi	17–18 December 2016	StarCraft II: Legacy of the Void	INnoVation	Stats	
World Championship Katowice	25–26 February & 3–5 March 2017	Counter-Strike: Global Offensive	Astralis	FaZe Clan	
World Championship Katowice	25–26 February & 3–5 March 2017	League of Legends	Flash Wolves	G2 Esports	
World Championship Katowice	25–26 February & 3–5 March 2017	StarCraft II: Legacy of the Void	TY	Stats	

=== Season XII ===
Intel Extreme Masters Season XII

Event	Dates	Game	Winner	Runner-up	Ref
Sydney	6–7 May 2017	Counter-Strike: Global Offensive	SK Gaming	FaZe Clan	
Shanghai	27–30 July 2017	Starcraft 2	Rogue	herO	
Oakland	18–19 November 2017	Counter-Strike: Global Offensive	Ninjas in Pyjamas	FaZe Clan	
Oakland	18–19 November 2017	PlayerUnknown's Battlegrounds	*aAa* Gaming	Tempo Storm	
PyeongChang	5–7 February 2018	Starcraft 2	Scarlett	sOs	
Katowice	2–4 March 2018	Counter-Strike: Global Offensive	Fnatic	FaZe Clan	
Katowice	2–4 March 2018	Starcraft 2	Rogue	Classic	

=== Season XIII ===
Intel Extreme Masters Season XVII

Event	Venue	Dates	Game	Champion	Runner-up	Prize Pool
Sydney	Qudos Bank Arena	1 - 6 May 2018	Counter-Strike: Global Offensive	Faze Clan	Astralis	US$250,000
Shanghai	Shanghai New International Expo Center	1 - 6 August 2018	Counter-Strike: Global Offensive	NRG Esports	TYLOO	US$250,000
Chicago	Jeunesse Arena	6 - 11 November 2018	Counter-Strike: Global Offensive	Astralis	Team Liquid	US$250,000
World Championship	Spodek Arena	13 February - 3 March 2019	Counter-Strike: Global Offensive	Astralis	ENCE	US$1,000,000
World Championship	Spodek Arena	13 February - 3 March 2019	StarCraft II	soO	Stats	US$400,000

=== Season XIV ===
Intel Extreme Masters Season XIV

Event	Venue	Dates	Game	Champion	Runner-up	Prize Pool
Sydney	Qudos Bank Arena	29 April – 5 May 2019	Counter-Strike: Global Offensive	Team Liquid	Fnatic	US$250,000
Chicago	United Center	18 – 21 July 2019	Counter-Strike: Global Offensive	Team Liquid	ENCE	US$250,000
Beijing	Beijing University Students' Stadium	7 – 10 November 2019	Counter-Strike: Global Offensive	Astralis	100 Thieves	US$250,000
World Championship	Spodek Arena	24 February – 1 March 2020	Counter-Strike: Global Offensive	Natus Vincere	G2 Esports	US$500,000
World Championship	Spodek Arena	24 February – 1 March 2020	StarCraft II	Rogue	Zest	US$400,000

=== Season XV ===
Intel Extreme Masters Season XV

Event	Venue	Dates	Game	Champion	Runner-up	Prize Pool
Global Challenge	Online	15 – 20 December 2020	Counter-Strike: Global Offensive	Astralis	Team Liquid	US$500,000
World Championship	Online	16 – 28 February 2021	Counter-Strike: Global Offensive	Gambit Esports	Virtus.pro	US$1,000,000
World Championship	Online	16 – 28 February 2021	StarCraft II	Reynor	Zest	US$250,000
Melbourne	Online	17 – 22 August 2021	Counter-Strike: Global Offensive	Cancelled		US$250,000

=== Season XVI ===
Intel Extreme Masters Season XVI

Event	Venue	Dates	Game	Champion	Runner-up	Prize Pool
Summer	Online	3 – 13 June 2021	Counter-Strike: Global Offensive	Gambit Esports	OG	US$250,000
Cologne	Lanxess Arena	6 – 18 July 2021	Counter-Strike: Global Offensive	Natus Vincere	G2 Esports	US$1,000,000
Winter	Quality Hotel™ Globe	2 – 12 December 2021	Counter-Strike: Global Offensive	Team Vitality	Ninjas in Pyjamas	US$250,000
Katowice	Spodek Arena	15 – 22 February 2022	Counter-Strike: Global Offensive	FaZe Clan	G2 Esports	US$1,000,000
Katowice	Spodek Arena	15 – 22 February 2022	StarCraft II	Serral	Reynor	US$500,000

=== Year 2022 ===
Intel Extreme Masters 2022

Event	Venue	Dates	Game	Champion	Runner-up	Prize Pool
Dallas	Kay Bailey Hutchison Convention Center	30 May – 5 June 2022	Counter-Strike: Global Offensive	Cloud9	ENCE	US$250,000
Cologne	Lanxess Arena	5 – 17 July 2022	Counter-Strike: Global Offensive	FaZe Clan	Natus Vincere	US$1,000,000
Rio Major	Jeunesse Arena	31 October – 13 November 2022	Counter-Strike: Global Offensive	Outsiders	Heroic	US$1,250,000
Katowice	Spodek Arena	31 January – 12 February 2023	Counter-Strike: Global Offensive	G2 Esports	Heroic	US$1,000,000
Katowice	Spodek Arena	31 January – 12 February 2023	StarCraft II	Oliveira	Maru	US$500,000

=== Year 2023 ===
Intel Extreme Masters 2023

Event	Venue	Dates	Game	Champion	Runner-up	Prize Pool
Katowice	Spodek Arena	4 - 12 February 2023	Counter-Strike: Global Offensive	G2 Esports	Heroic	US$1,000,000
Rio	Jeunesse Arena	17 – 23 April 2023	Counter-Strike: Global Offensive	Team Vitality	Heroic	US$250,000
Dallas	Kay Bailey Hutchison Convention Center	29 May – 4 June 2023	Counter-Strike: Global Offensive	ENCE	MOUZ	US$250,000
Cologne	Lanxess Arena	25 July – 6 August 2023	Counter-Strike: Global Offensive	G2 Esports	ENCE	US$1,000,000
Sydney	Aware Super Theater	16 – 22 October 2023	Counter-Strike 2	FaZe Clan	Complexity Gaming	US$250,000

=== Year 2024 ===
Intel Extreme Masters 2024

Event	Venue	Dates	Game	Champion	Runner-up	Prize Pool
Katowice	Spodek Arena	3 - 11 February 2024	Counter-Strike 2	Team Spirit	FaZe Clan	US$1,000,000
Katowice	Spodek Arena	3 - 11 February 2024	StarCraft II	Serral	Maru	US$500,000
Chengdu	Chengdu Performing Arts Center	8 – 14 April 2024	Counter-Strike 2	FaZe Clan	MOUZ	US$250,000
Dallas	Kay Bailey Hutchison Convention Center	27 May – 2 June 2024	Counter-Strike 2	G2 Esports	Team Vitality	US$250,000
Cologne	Lanxess Arena	7 – 18 August 2024	Counter-Strike 2	Team Vitality	Natus Vincere	US$1,000,000
Rio	Farmasi Arena	7 – 13 October 2024	Counter-Strike 2	Natus Vincere	MOUZ	US$250,000

=== Year 2025 ===
Intel Extreme Masters 2025

Event	Venue	Dates	Game	Champion	Runner-up	Prize Pool
Katowice	Spodek Arena	29 January – 9 February 2025	Counter-Strike 2	Team Vitality	Team Spirit	US$1,250,000
Melbourne	Rod Laver Arena	21 – 27 April 2025	Counter-Strike 2	Team Vitality	Team Falcons	US$1,000,000
Dallas	Kay Bailey Hutchison Convention Center	19 – 25 May 2025	Counter-Strike 2	Team Vitality	MOUZ	US$1,000,000
Cologne	Lanxess Arena	23 July – 3 August 2025	Counter-Strike 2	Team Spirit	MOUZ	US$1,000,000
Chengdu	Chengdu Financial City Performance Center	3 – 9 November 2025	Counter-Strike 2	FURIA	Team Vitality	US$1,000,000

=== Year 2026 ===
Intel Extreme Masters 2026

Event	Venue	Dates	Game	Champion	Runner-up	Prize Pool
Kraków	Tauron Arena Kraków	27 January – 8 February 2026	Counter-Strike 2	Team Vitality	Furia Esports	US$1,250,000
Rio	Farmasi Arena	14 April – 19 April 2026	Counter-Strike 2	Team Vitality	Team Spirit	US$1,000,000
Atlanta	Georgia World Congress Center	11 May – 15 May 2026	Counter-Strike 2	Natus Vincere	GamerLegion	US$1,000,000
Cologne Major	Lanxess Arena	2 June – 21 June 2026	Counter-Strike 2	Team Falcons	FURIA Esports	US$1,250,000
Beijing	Wukesong Arena	2 November – 8 November 2026	Counter-Strike 2			US$1,000,000

== Format ==
IEM utilizes a fair number of offline qualifiers. During Season 5, qualifiers were held for North America, Europe, and Southeast Asia regions. Those who qualify for the finals are placed into two groups of six, of which the top two advance. The first place member of each group goes directly to the semifinals, and the second and third place members go into the quarterfinals.

== Organisation ==
The Intel Extreme Masters are run by the ESL, part of the ESL FACEIT Group which is owned by Savvy Games Group. Savvy Games Group is based in Riyadh, Saudi Arabia and is owned by the Saudi Public Investment Fund (PIF).

== See also ==
- ESL Pro League
