= QuakeCon =

Annual video game convention

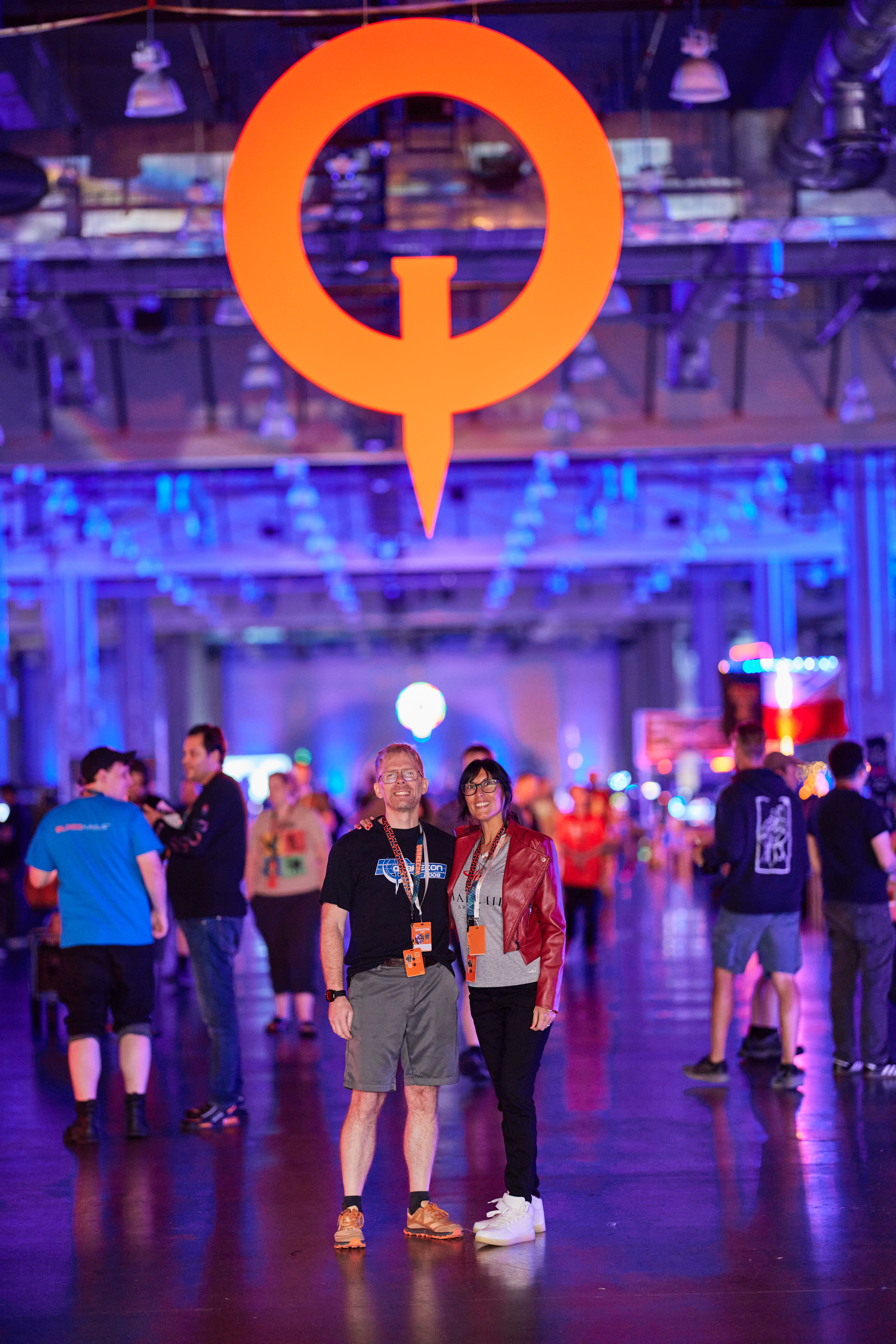
- Status: Active
- Genre: Video game (LAN party)
- Frequency: Annually
- Venue: Gaylord Texan
- Locations: Dallas, Texas
- Country: United States
- Years active: 30
- Inaugurated: August 15, 1996; 30 years ago
- Most recent: August 7, 2025; 15 months ago
- Organizer: ZeniMax Media
- Filing status: Corporate
- Website: quakecon.org

QuakeCon is a yearly convention held by ZeniMax Media to celebrate and promote the major franchises of id Software and other studios owned by ZeniMax. It includes a large, paid, bring-your-own-computer (BYOC) LAN party event with a competitive tournament held every year in Dallas, Texas, USA. The event, which is named after id Software's game Quake, sees thousands of gamers from all over the world attend every year to celebrate the company's gaming dynasty.

The event is highly dependent on volunteers to cover many aspects of the organization of the event. QuakeCon has historically had a reputation as the "Woodstock of gaming", and a week of "peace, love, and rockets!".

The 25th QuakeCon event had been planned for August 2020 in Dallas, Texas, but due to the COVID-19 pandemic, was canceled by Bethesda Softworks and id Software on March 31, citing difficulties in planning with vendors and exhibitors at this stage. An online QuakeCon was announced in June 2020 to replace the live show in August 2020. The 2021 and 2022 events were also held online. The return to a live event took place on August 10–13, 2023 in Grapevine, Texas.

== History ==
=== Origin ===
QuakeCon originally grew out of a group of people on the EFnet IRC network, in channel #quake. As various regular visitors to the channel began expressing a desire to meet and game together in person, Jim "H2H" Elson, a gamer from the Dallas area with ties to the local Dallas-area gaming community, and Yossarian "yossman" Holmberg, a computer consultant from Waterloo, Ontario, Canada, came up with the idea of assembling at a hotel. The original event name was actually '#quakecon', named after the IRC channel, though this quickly evolved into just 'QuakeCon'. Mr. Elson organized the bulk of the event for the first two years, until the number of people attending each year demanded a more organized approach. Volunteers grouped into teams to assist in the setup, troubleshooting, and tear down of the event's equipment and network.

=== 1996–2002 ===
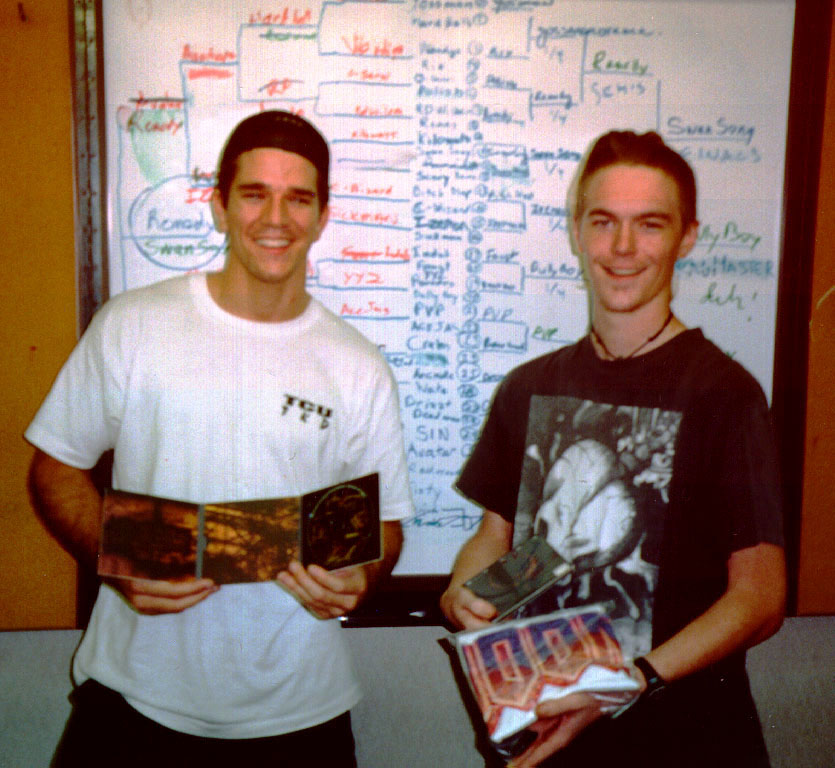
Winner Remedy (left) and runner-up Bullyboy (right) at QuakeCon 1996

The first event, in August 1996, was held at a conference room of a La Quinta Inn in Garland, Texas. The 1,250 square foot venue hosted around 40 people. Attendees who had brought their computers along to the event set up a small, impromptu network, in one of the hotel meeting rooms, playing mostly Quake I and Doom, testing deathmatch skills. A small tournament was held, with winners taking home T-shirts as prizes. The highlight of this first gathering came on the eve of the last day, when the entire id Software team showed up at the event in a surprise and most-welcome visit, stopping by to chat with the participants. John Carmack, lead programmer for Doom/Quake, participated in a 30–45 min. group chat with attendees on the porch of the hotel. Some ideas discussed during that chat eventually made it into Quake's future public releases. This "Carmack's Talk" grew into a yearly keynote speech that lasted through 2013.

QuakeCon 1997 brought an estimated 650 attendees to the Holiday Inn in Plano, Texas. It was covered by numerous Internet and broadcast media outlets, and was sponsored in part by id Software and Activision.

QuakeCon 1998 was held in conjunction with the Cyberathlete Professional League at Infomart in Dallas, Texas. Due to poor planning and the lack of people who had helped make the first two events a success, QuakeCon 1998 is regarded by many as being only partially a QuakeCon event. However, it was instrumental in motivating a group of people to start planning QuakeCon 1999 early.

From 1999 to 2002, QuakeCon took place that the Mesquite Convention Center in Texas. The 1999 event was the first event in which id Software played a major role in the organization. Recognizing that major sponsors were needed, David Miller a.k.a. "Wino" & Paul Horoky a.k.a. "devilseye", both original QuakeCon 1996 people, contacted id Software and convinced them to become the main sponsor, and to help out with finding more sponsors. Together with Anna Kang (then id Software employee, now John Carmack's wife) and a team of volunteers, Mr. Miller & Mr. Horoky set out to build QuakeCon 1999, which became the template for later years. A change of venue allowed the convention to grow larger than it had ever been before, and, this time, just down the street from id Software headquarters in Mesquite. id Software employees, including John Carmack, participated in various tournaments with attendees on-site as well. A large number of companies sponsored the event for the first time, including Activision, AMD, Apple Computer, ATI Technologies, Logitech, Linksys, and Lucent Technologies. QuakeCon 1999 was also the first time Quake 3 was used in competition as the game had not yet been released to the public.

2002 saw the retirement of John Carney, and Brian Davis assumed stewardship of the event as executive director. 2002 was also the first year id assumed a very active role in the pre-event activities, with the arrival of Marty Stratton a year earlier. Added Return to Castle Wolfenstein to the tournament lineup in a Team-based tournament. First unofficial Ms. QuakeCon event, first appearance of Doom III theater, also the first appearance of Mister Sinus Theater 3000 (later known as The Sinus Show, and ultimately Master Pancake Theater), an Austin, Texas-based MST3K troupe, lambasting Britney Spears' movie Crossroads.

=== 2003–2009 ===
QuakeCon 2003 took place at Adam's Mark Hotel in Dallas, Texas It was the first change in venue since the convention moved to Mesquite, Texas, USA, 4 years prior. Tapper continued to coordinate volunteer activity, while id assumed much more of the pre-event planning through the capable hands of Marty Stratton. Ms. QuakeCon evolved into a tournament-based event with a sponsor, id unveiled Doom 3 deathmatch. The first display of the award-winning franchise called "Call of Duty" found its way into the exhibitor area.

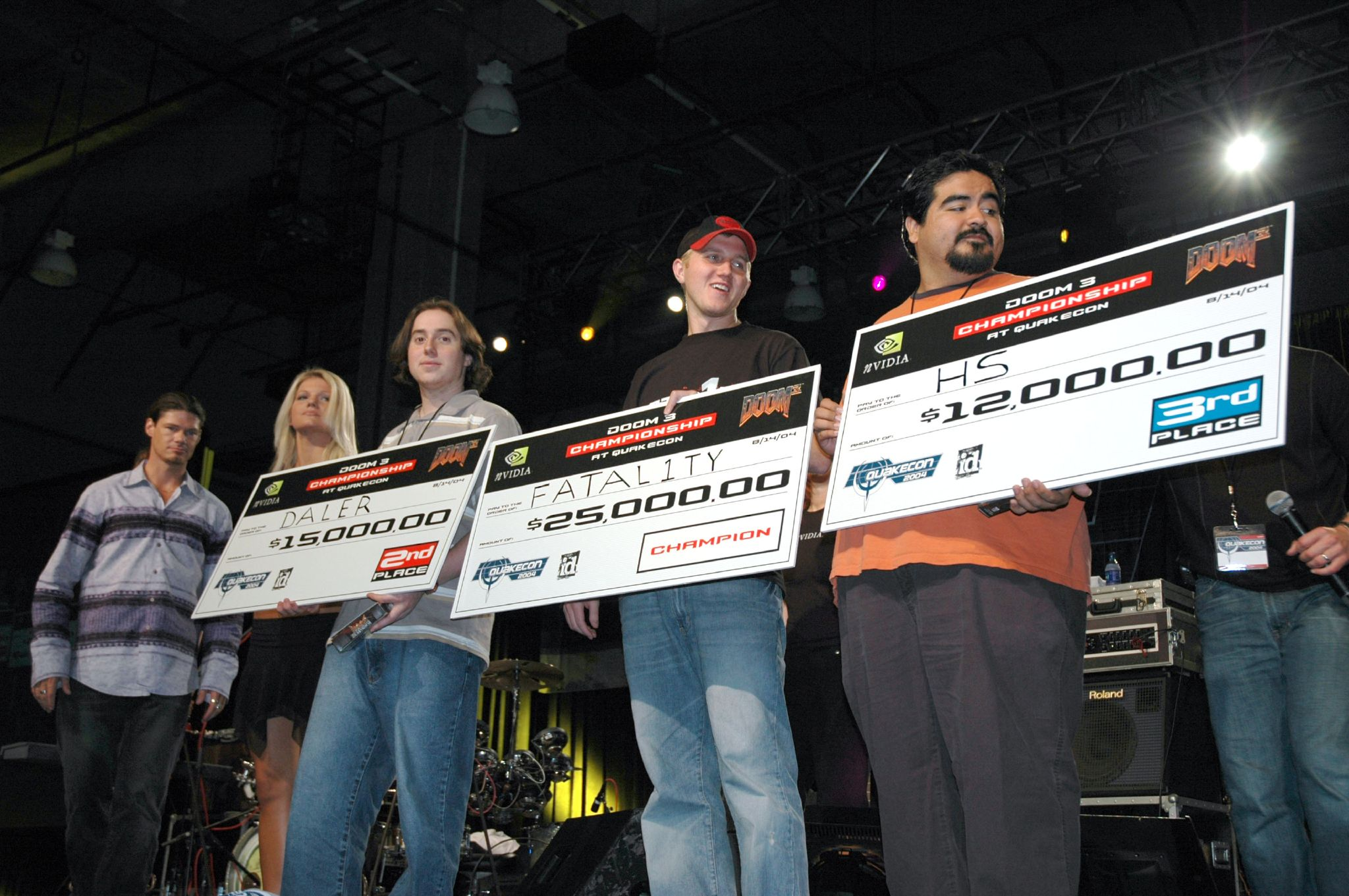
QuakeCon 2004 Doom 3 tournament winners

QuakeCon 2004 took place at the Gaylord Texan Resort Hotel and Convention Center in Texas. Yet another change of venue brought QuakeCon into the record books as the largest LAN party in North America, with over 3000 BYOC attendees. Tournaments prizes totaled over $150,000 and saw the world's first Official Doom 3 Tournament, won by Johnathan "Fatal1ty" Wendel. The event also had a live performances by The Sinus Show, and Tweaker, featuring Chris Vrenna, former Nine Inch Nails drummer. This year also saw another significant change in leadership, as a result of an injury to Brian Davis just weeks before the event. Aaron "Alric" Ferguson was appointed to fill in for Tapper at the last minute.

QuakeCon 2005 was another large event which saw the unveiling of Quake 4 multiplayer. It was Aaron Ferguson's first complete year as executive director, and the first time at QuakeCon featuring an all girl gamer tournament with major cash prizes. It was the first year of Intel's sponsorship of QuakeCon, beating out AMD.

QuakeCon 2006 took place at Hilton Anatole in Texas. QuakeCon 2006 was the first time Enemy Territory: Quake Wars was playable by the general public. Longer than normal delays leading up to the official event announcement fueled Internet speculation that the event was actually canceled for the first time ever. It was also discussed publicly earlier in the year by id Software executives that the event had a possibility of not being held inside Texas, nearly breaking a 10-year tradition since the convention's start. The entire event was also announced, planned, and executed in little over a month, a much shorter timeline than prior years. The first QuakeCon to feature a Team Deathmatch tournament. It was the first event to include the Nvidia Quickdraw tournaments, which pulled random people from the BYOC area to compete for 1,000 dollars.

At QuakeCon 2007, Aaron "Alric" Ferguson continued in the role of executive director for this event, which sported a 5x increase in vendor space (25,000 sq ft) over the 2006 event, 7,000 sq ft (650 m^{2}). total event space, and the return of the popular "Quick Draw" tournaments for all general attendees. The second public beta of Enemy Territory: Quake Wars was released to BYOC attendees on the first day of the event. There were just two featured tournaments, both with $50,000 purses, and both sponsored by NVIDIA: ET:QW, and the new Quad Damage Tournament, which combined all four Quake games into one competition. The event was also highlighted by a slew of major announcements, including id Software's new intellectual property RAGE, a sneak peek at the "id Tech 5" engine, a February 10, 2007, release date for ET:QW, updates on the new Return to Castle Wolfenstein game title and major motion picture, the revelation that old id Software titles were to be made available via Steam, the upcoming debuts of Quake Arena Arcade, Quake Zero (now officially named Quake Live), and Quake Arena DS, also—in an unprecedented move—the announcement of the dates and venue for the next QuakeCon before the current year's event was even finished.

QuakeCon 2008 marked the debut of the first-ever Quake Live 1v1 and CTF tournaments. (sponsored by Intel) As well as the Activision Enemy Territory: QUAKE Wars Team Championships (featuring competitions on both PC and for the first time on Xbox 360), The Alienware Quick-Draw Challenge, and the QuakeCon Ultimate Power Up.

QuakeCon 2009 returned to the Gaylord Texan Resort Hotel and Convention Center. Like the year before, Quakecon 2009 had both 1v1 and CTF tournaments for Quake Live. The notable difference with this year's tournaments was two separate 1v1 competitions, one for only pro players, and the other was open to everyone else. This was a much appreciated feature from the community because there was no longer as many blow out games in the tournament. Marcus "djWHEAT" Graham (one of the commentators for this year's tournaments) also expressed his opinions to John Carmack from the shout casting booth saying that the separation "alleviates any hesitation or frustration" for amateur players that want a chance to compete. Quakecon 2009 was also the first Quakecon to have the shoutcasters on stage during the grand finals.

=== 2010–present ===
QuakeCon 2010–2016 returned to Hilton Anatole. The 2012 event was the first year to ever fill BYOC on Friday. This year marked the first year for several Executive Staff including a new executive director of Michael "TnT_Trash" Wolf. Also Oculus Rift showcase.

QuakeCon 2017–2019 took place at the Gaylord Texan Convention Center in Texas, as did the 2023 event. QuakeCon 2024 took place at the same location on August 8–11, as did the 2025 event on August 7–10.

== Past events ==
=== Past results and records in Duel Tournaments ===
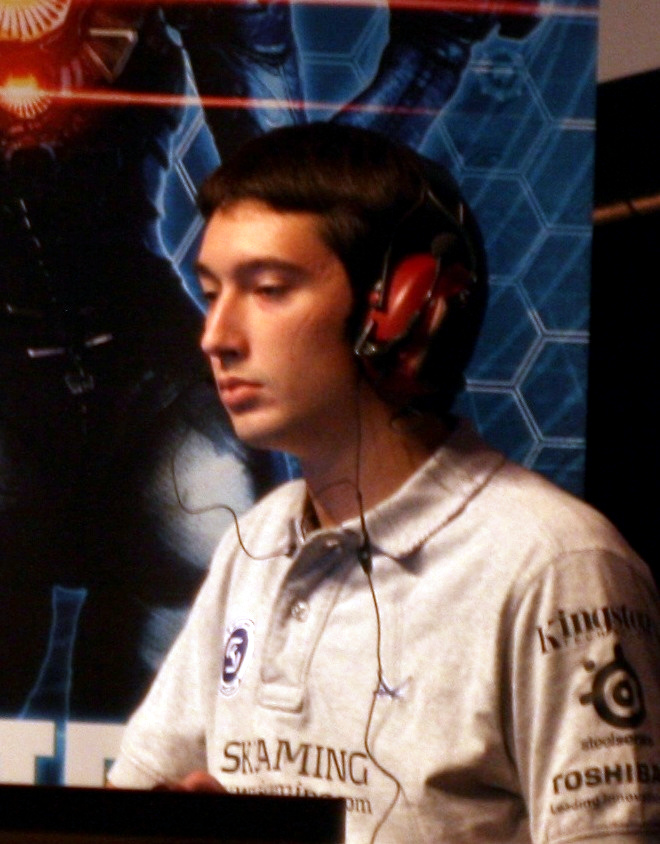
Rapha has won the most events at QuakeCon.

- Most wins
  - Shane "Rapha" Hendrixson : 7 (2009, 2011, 2013, 2015, 2016, 2020, 2023)
  - Alexey "Cypher" Yanushevsky : 4 (2008, 2010, 2012, 2014)
  - John "ZeRo4" Hill : 3 (2000, 2001, 2003)
  - Dan "RiX" Hammans : 2 (1997, 1998)
  - Johan "Toxjq" Quick : 2 (2006, 2007)
  - Nikita "clawz" Marchinsky : 2 (2017, 2018)
  - Marcel "k1llsen" Paul: 2 (2019, 2022)

Year	Champion	Runner-up	Game
1996	Richard "Remedy" Reed	BullyBoy	Quake
1997	Dan "RiX" Hammans	Forego	QuakeWorld
1998	Dan "RiX" Hammans	Victor "Makaveli" Cuadra	Quake II
1999	George "DieharD" Myshlyayev	Tim "1134-Bane" Santaniello	Quake III Arena
2000	John "ZeRo4" Hill	Terrel "Matador" Garret	Quake III Arena
2001	John "ZeRo4" Hill	Johnathan "Fatal1ty" Wendel	Quake III Arena
2002	Alexey "LeXeR" Nesterov	Sean "Daler" Price	Quake III Arena
2003	John "ZeRo4" Hill	Alexander "Z4muZ" Ihrfors	Quake III Arena
2004	Paul "czm" Nelson	John "ZeRo4" Hill	Quake III Arena
2004	Johnathan "Fatal1ty" Wendel	Sean "Daler" Price	Doom 3
2005	Fredrik "gopher" Quick	Yang "RocketBoy" Meng	Doom 3
2005	Jamie "g0d-Missy" Pereyda	Alana "g0d-Ms.X" Reid	Quake III Arena (Women only)
2005	Mikael "Purri" Tarvainen	Brad "Doze" Herrlinger	Quake II
2006	Johan "Toxjq" Quick	Anton "Cooller" Singov	Quake 4
2007	Johan "Toxjq" Quick	Magnus "fox" Olsson	QuakeWorld, Quake II, Quake III, Quake 4
2007	Kevin "Kev!" McShane	Zach "MrGreen" Segal	Doom 3
2008	Alexey "Cypher" Yanushevsky	John "ZeRo4" Hill	Quake Live
2009	Shane "Rapha" Hendrixson	Sebastian "Spart1e" Siira	Quake Live
2010	Alexey "Cypher" Yanushevsky	Anton "Cooller" Singov	Quake Live
2011	Shane "Rapha" Hendrixson	Kévin "strenx" Baéza	Quake Live
2012	Alexey "Cypher" Yanushevsky	Tim "DaHanG" Fogarty	Quake Live
2013	Shane "Rapha" Hendrixson	Sergey "evil" Orekhov	Quake Live
2013	Jefferson "JKist3" Kist	Chris "DevastatioN" Felix	Doom II
2014	Alexey "Cypher" Yanushevsky	Tim "DaHanG" Fogarty	Quake Live
2015	Shane "Rapha" Hendrixson	Sergey "evil" Orekhov	Quake Live
2016	Shane "Rapha" Hendrixson	Sergey "evil" Orekhov	Quake Live
2017	Nikita "clawz" Marchinsky	Sander "Vo0" Kaasjager	Quake Champions
2017	Dawid "David" Gryglewski	pthy	Quake II
2017	Dennis "LocKtar" Larsson	Marcus "dirtbox" Cooke	QuakeWorld
2018	Nikita "clawz" Marchinsky	Tim "DaHanG" Fogarty	Quake Champions
2019	Marcel "k1llsen" Paul	Anton "Cooller" Singov	Quake Champions
2019	Jeff "Thump4" McShane	Dead Beat	Quake II
2019	Jeff "Thump4" McShane	Dan "RiX" Hammans	QuakeWorld
2020	Shane "Rapha" Hendrixson	Adrián "RAISY" Birgány	Quake Champions
2021	Marco "vengeurR" Ragusa	Adrián "RAISY" Birgány	Quake Champions
2022	Marcel "k1llsen" Paul	Adrián "RAISY" Birgány	Quake Champions
2023	Shane "Rapha" Hendrixson	Adrián "RAISY" Birgány	Quake Champions
2026	Jeff "Thump4" McShane	Paul "czm" Nelson	Quake Live, Quake II, QuakeWorld

== Sponsors ==
QuakeCon is primarily paid for by ZeniMax Media and fees paid by attendees in conjunction with the sponsorship of leading technology companies. Past sponsors of the event include Activision, nVidia, AMD, Aspyr, ASUS, Ventrilo, Apple, ATI Technologies, AT&T Inc., Alienware, Ageia, 1UP Network, FragArcade, Intel, D-Link, Logitech, Linksys, Spike TV, Newegg and Lucent Technologies.
