= Quake Live =

2010 first-person shooter video game

- Developer: id Software
- Publisher: Bethesda Softworks
- Director: Tim Willits
- Programmers: Adam Pyle; Mike Rubits
- Series: Quake
- Engine: id Tech 3
- Platform: Microsoft Windows
- Release: August 6, 2010
- Genre: First-person shooter
- Modes: Single-player, multiplayer

Quake Live is a first-person arena shooter video game by id Software. It is an updated version of Quake III Arena that was originally designed as a free-to-play game launched via a web browser plug-in. On September 17, 2014, the game was re-launched as a standalone title on Steam.

Quake Live was previously a free to play game, with subscription options offering additional arenas, game types and game server options. The game is no longer free to play after October 27, 2015 and subscription options were removed.

== Gameplay ==
The gameplay of Quake Live consists of players attempting to kill more of their opponents than any other player or team in a given match. This is achieved by navigating a 3D environment and shooting other players with a variety of weapons, while collecting health, armor, weapons, ammo and various power-ups. As players get more advanced, they use other tricks and techniques such as rocket and strafe jumping.

Quake Live was released as a free version of Quake III: Gold (Quake III and its expansion pack, Team Arena) available only through a web browser. Skill-based matchmaking is powered by a "metagame engine" developed by GaimTheory. Development of the match-making system was taken on by id Software after GaimTheory's closure.

=== Game modes ===
Quake Live arena Dredwerkz

- Free-for-all (FFA): Players engage in a match, where everyone fights for themselves. Whoever hits the frag limit first wins and ends the game. When the time limit expires, player with the most frags is the winner.
  - Instagib: free-for-all mode or TDM where players start with only a railgun. There are no powerups around the map (i.e. health, ammo, weapons). Instagib servers are unranked. Instagib is one shot one kill.
- Duel: Player versus player (1-on-1) combat. Whoever gets the most frags before the time is up wins.
- Race: Players start at a point/flag, and they have to get to another point as fast as possible using strafe jumping, rocket jumping, and other techniques, competing against other players. Uses PQL physics, so the player moves faster than usual.
- Team deathmatch (TDM): Same rules as free-for-all but in this mode, two teams fight each other.
- Clan arena (CA): Teambased gameplay where everyone starts fully equipped with full armor and weapons. When fragged, the player must wait for the next round to begin. Players can rocket jump and plasma climb with no health penalty. Players on the same team suffer no damage from their own teammates' weapons.
- Capture the flag (CTF): Each team has a base, holding a flag. To earn points and win the game, a player must take the opposing team's flag and return it to their own base, while his team's flag is secure at his own base. Players have the ability to drop the flag at any given time for a tactical play.
  - InstaCTF: Similar to Instagib (i.e. railgun, lack of powerups, etc.) but in a CTF format. Instagib CTF servers are also unranked.
- 1-flag CTF (1FCTF): Each team fights for control of the white flag in the center, and work to carry it to the enemy flag stand. Unlike in CTF, the flag in 1FCTF, can be thrown between teammates as well as through teleporters.
- Harvester (HAR): When a player is fragged, a skull spawns from the skull generator. Players must then carry the skulls to the enemy flag stand to earn points.
- Freeze tag (FT): A team based game mode combining elements of clan arena and team deathmatch. Rather than spectating when one is fragged, one is instead "frozen", and cannot respawn until a player on their team "thaws" them by standing adjacent to them for several seconds. When all players on one team are frozen, the other team wins the round.
  - InstaFreeze (IFT): Similar to Instagib (i.e. railgun, lack of powerups, etc.) but in a FT format. Instagib FT servers are also unranked.
- Domination (DOM): Capture domination points to earn points for your team. First team to reach the Score Limit wins.
- Attack and defend (A&D): Players, spawn equipped with all weapons and full armor, alternate each round attacking or defending the flag. Touch the enemy's flag to be awarded a bonus point. Eliminate the opposing team or capture their flag to win the round.
- Red rover (RR): Every player joins either the red or the blue team, and these two teams play one match continuously. In this mode, when a player is fragged, they immediately respawn as a member of the opposing team. This allows for continuous play, instead of having to wait for the next round. The game ends when one team no longer has any players. Players receive a point for fragging another player and lose a point for dying. The player with the most points at the end of the round wins that particular match.

During the QuakeCon 2008 keynote speech, John Carmack stated that Quake Live has no plans to allow user-made modifications, but they have hired successful Quake III mod authors to help them with their project. A large number of the maps are based heavily on originals from Quake III Arena, Team Arena and popular user-made maps. Newer map additions even include maps from previous Quake titles, such as 'The Edge', which is almost identical to the famous Quake II map Q2DM1.

== Development ==
On August 3, 2007, at QuakeCon 2007, id Software publicly announced their plans to release a free browser-based Quake III game titled Quake Zero. In early 2008, the title was officially renamed to Quake Live due to a domain squatting issue.

During late 2008 and early 2009, Quake Live was in an invitation-only closed beta. A handful of players were selected to begin the testing of the beta and were later allowed to invite a limited number of friends, whom, in turn, were permitted to send out invitations of their own. On February 24, 2009, the game progressed from closed beta to open beta, which caused an increased amount of traffic on the web server. Queues were organized to limit the stress and prevent the overloading of the servers. Within the first six hours after launch over 113,000 user accounts were created. The queues were removed after several days, and the servers were then upgraded to handle the larger volume of traffic.

Once Quake Live exited its closed beta stage, it was to be funded partially by in-game and website-based advertisements. IGA Worldwide were contracted by id Software to handle this aspect of the game's marketing. Problems with this model surfaced almost immediately with the announcement by the advertising agency that they were struggling as a result of the financial difficulties. In March 2009, the agency admitted that sale was a possibility if further investments were not forthcoming.

At QuakeCon 2009, John Carmack stated publicly that their financial scheme for the game had so far failed to provide sufficient income to keep the project in the black. As a result, he announced that a premium subscription service was being planned:

The in-game advertising stuff has not been big business. That's not going to be able to carry the project ... Quake Live is gonna be Quake Live for the foreseeable future ... It's only just now that we're going to be able to put it to the test.

Marty Stratton, id Software's Executive Producer, has commented that:

The plan is to completely integrate the ability to start and manage private games directly through QUAKE LIVE, utilizing all of the friends, awareness and notification features we have available through the site. This ability will be the cornerstone of a QUAKE LIVE Premium Service that will be offered for a small monthly fee (likely less than $5 per month).

On August 6, 2010, the game left its public beta period, and "premium" and "pro" subscription options were announced. On September 11, 2012, id Software introduced subscriptions in one, three, six, and twelve month increments, along with the ability to purchase redeemable gift tokens.

In November 2013, citing the planned deprecation of NPAPI browser plug-ins by major browsers, Quake Live began to phase out its browser version and began migrating to a standalone client. However, this change necessitated the removal of OS X and Linux support from the game.

On August 27, 2014, Quake Live saw what was its biggest update since the game's initial release in 2010. The main objective of the update was to allow for new players to better integrate into the game with a prominent focus on the game's spawn system, movement and item control. Notable changes included the addition of loadouts in certain game types, a "continuous bunny hop" mode, a new Heavy Machine Gun weapon, and other changes across the game.

On October 28, 2015, a major update was released, representing "an accumulation of a year of code updates, optimizations, and over 4,500 map fixes". As part of the update, Quake Live also switched from its own in-house account system to using the Steamworks API, giving the game tighter integration with the Steam ecosystem and client features. However, due to these changes, all user statistics were reset. Premium subscription options were dropped as the game was no longer free-to-play and must be purchased for $10 USD.

== Competitive play ==
Being largely similar to Quake III Arena, which is renowned for its extensive use in professional electronic sports, Quake Live has seen inclusion in many tournaments worldwide. In recent years, however, the game has experienced a decline in the number of tournaments due to waning popularity. The last major event currently holding Quake Live competitions is QuakeCon.

The following competitions and organizations have held Quake Live events:

- Adroits (2012–present)
- Asus (2010–2011)
- DreamHack (2011–2013)
- Electronic Sports World Cup (2010)
- FaceIt (2012–Present)
- Fnatic MSI PLAY BEAT IT (2010)
- Intel Extreme Masters (2010–2011)
- The Gathering (2010–2011)
- QuakeCon (2008–2016)
- Zotac (2009–2012)
- 125fps (2013–present)

== Reception ==
PC Gamer gave the game an 8.8/10 score and commented: "Quake Live may be a 10-year-old shooter, but it's still a rush".
