= Paul Chaloner =

Esports commentator

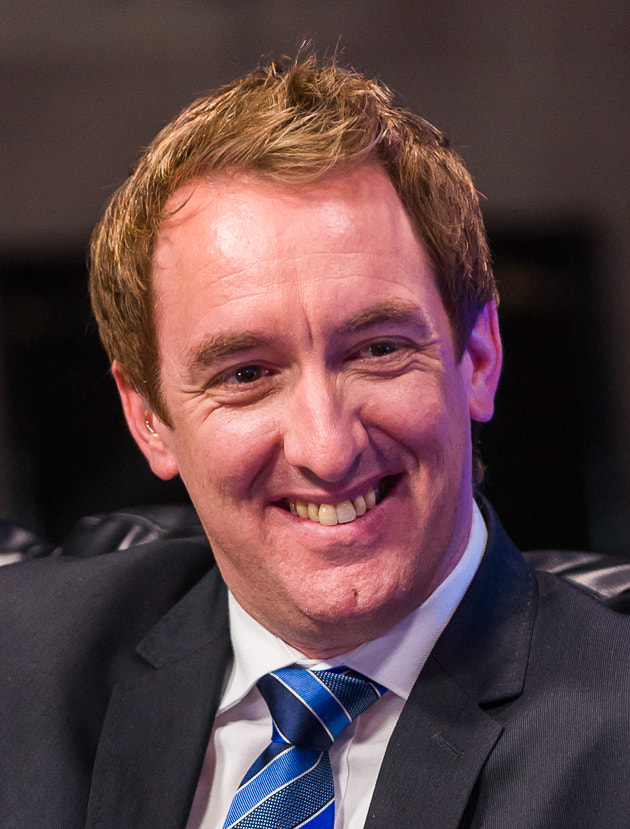
- Chaloner at the 2014 StarCraft II World Championship Series
- Born: 1971 (age 54–55)
- Other name: Redeye (Note: Previously "ReDeYe" (until 2017))
- Occupation: Esports commentator
- Years active: 2002–2020

Paul "Redeye" Chaloner (born 1971) is a British former esports broadcaster.

He has broadcast in dozens of countries including China, United States, Singapore, Australia, Denmark and others on media forms including TV channels, live internet videos, and TV series in the UK. He has also commentated on tournaments on live video streams and internet radio starting in 2002.

Redeye has commentated on games including Starcraft 2, Quake 3, Quake 4, Quake Champions, Unreal Tournament, Unreal Tournament 2004, Counter-Strike: Source, Call of Duty 2, Counter-Strike: Global Offensive, Hearthstone, World of Warcraft, Smite, Dota 2, FIFA, Team Fortress 2 and Project Gotham Racing.

== Career ==
Chaloner's career in esports started when he provided commentary for an online Quake game in 2002.

After a brief spell at ClanBase Radio, mainly commentating on ClanBase EuroCup and ClanBase OpenCups, he began commentating on other leagues, including the PC ZONE readers challenge and various Jolt leagues. He mainly covered Unreal Tournament games in the early days, but moved on to cover Quake 3, Counter-Strike and Counter-Strike: Source.

In early 2005, he joined up with Radio iTG and attended events around the world including the 2005 and 2006 iterations of the WCG, ESWC, and QuakeCon. He has also commentated in Singapore, Australia, China, North America and Europe.

By 2006, Chaloner worked on several TV shows, both in the United Kingdom, the United States, Denmark and Australia, and partnered with Creative Artists to work on gaming TV shows. He also hosted and presented the rock concert Fuse for Ubisoft in 2006. In March 2007, he set up and formed QuadV with his long-time friend Oliver "Jester" Aldridge.

Since leaving Heaven Media, Chaloner appeared as lead commentator at a number of high-profile events including the 2010 and 2011 WCG Grand Finals (in Los Angeles, United States and Busan, South Korea respectively), the AMD Heaven GamExperience (in London, UK) and the 2012 Intel Extreme Masters events in Kyiv, Ukraine and Hamburg, Germany. He worked for the Electronic Sports League as head of content and media.

In 2014, he took part at the Dota 2 ESL One tournament in the Commerzbank Arena in Frankfurt, Germany. He was the host of the ESL One Cologne 2015 CS:GO tournament in August 2014. In March 2014, he joined Gfinity as Head of Broadcasting. In 2015, he helped host the Dota 2 tournament The International 2015, which had the largest prize pool in esports history at the time. Richard Lewis and Chaloner hosted the CS:GO Major DreamHack Open Cluj-Napoca 2015. During the 2015 Frankfurt Major, Chaloner's deadpan delivery of "brutal, savage, rekt" in a post-game commentary became an internet meme, especially in the Dota 2 community. Chaloner later referenced the meme in 2016 by repeating "nippy, kind, langur" in the same cadence, referencing the autogenerated name a GIF of the incident was given on Gfycat.

In 2016, Chaloner returned to host The International 2016. In 2017, he returned to CS:GO to host the 11th official Valve Major, the PGL Major: Krakow 2017. That year, he was a commentator at the Quake World Champion Final (QuakeCon) in Houston, Texas. In 2018, he and Jorien "Sheever" van der Heijden hosted the China Dota2 Supermajor in Shanghai, China. He returned to host Dota 2s The International 2018. He again returned to host The International 2019.

In 2016, Chaloner co-founded Code Red Esports, an esports consultancy. In June 2020, Chaloner announced that he would no longer be working in the esports industry following several allegations against him of personal assault and workplace bullying. Chaloner has denied most of the allegations. He also announced that he would be resigning from his position at Code Red Esports.
