= Life (gamer) =

South Korean esports player

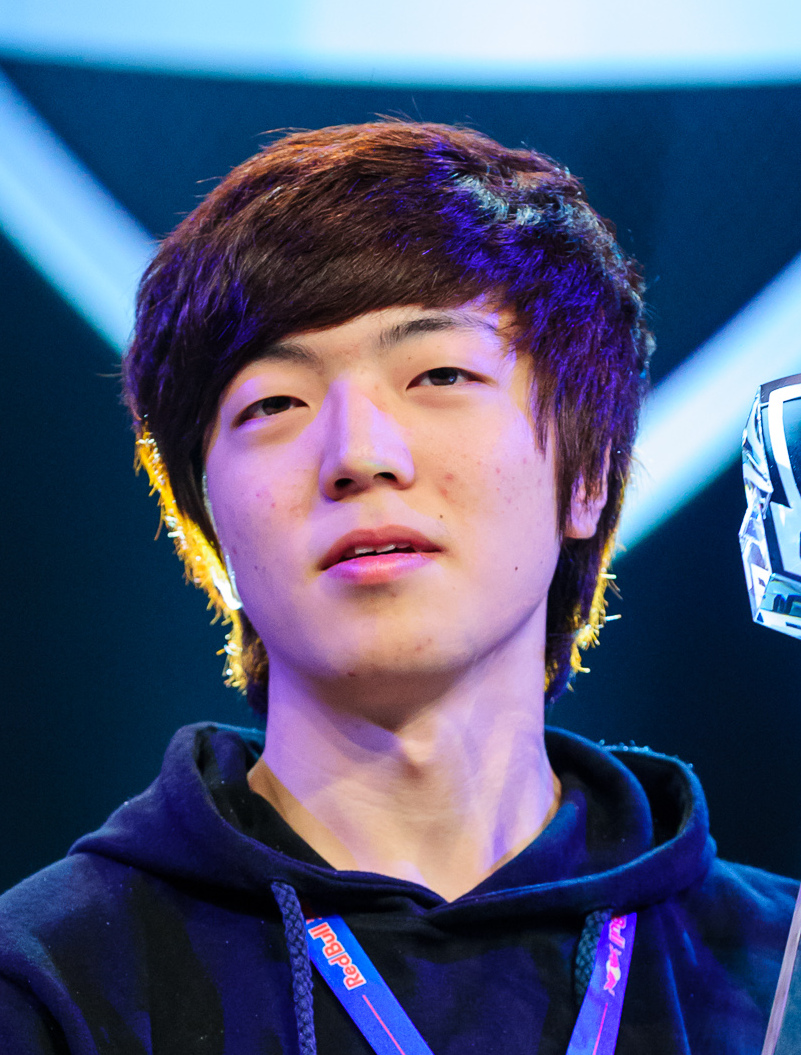
- Lee at the 2013 MLG Winter Championship

Personal information
- Name: 이승현 (Lee Seung-Hyun)
- Born: January 11, 1997 (age 29)
- Nationality: South Korean

Career information
- Game: StarCraft
- Playing career: 2011–2016

Team history
- 2011–2012: ZeNEX
- 2012–2015: StarTale
- 2015–2016: KT Rolster
- 2016: Afreeca Freecs

Lee Seung-Hyun (Korean: 이승현, born January 11, 1997), better known as Life, is a South Korean former professional StarCraft II player. He began his professional career in 2011 with Team Zenex, which later merged with StarTale. He subsequently represented teams such as KT Rolster and briefly, Afreeca Freecs. Throughout his career, Life distinguished himself as one of the most accomplished StarCraft II players in the history of the game. He secured numerous premier tournament victories, including a World Championship Series title in 2014, two Global StarCraft II League (GSL) titles, a GSL Blizzard Cup title, two Major League Gaming events, two DreamHack tournaments, and one Intel Extreme Masters competition.

Life's career ended with controversy in 2016 when he was embroiled in a match fixing scandal that resulted in his arrest. Subsequently, he was convicted and handed an 18-month suspended prison sentence, along with a fine of ₩70,000,000 (approximately US$58,000). Additionally, Life received a lifetime ban from participating in Korean esports events.

== Career ==
=== Early success (2011–2012) ===
At the age of 14, Life began his professional StarCraft career by joining Team Zenex in March 2011. He primarily participated in the iCCup Korean Weekly, later renamed the ESV TV Korean Weekly. Within one month of competitive play, he achieved his first tournament victory by defeating Jung "jjakji" Ji-hoon in the finals of ESV TV Korean Weekly Season 1 #6. Over his initial seven months as a competitor, Life secured top-eight finishes or higher nine times. Among these, he reached the finals on four occasions, claiming victory in two. During this period, Life engaged in a rivalry with fellow player Yun "TaeJa" Young-seo. Throughout their encounters in the Korean Weekly tournaments, TaeJa defeated Life on five occasions, while Life had yet to secure a win against him.

Subsequently, Life participated in the Global StarCraft II Team League (GSTL). During one of the GSTL events, he achieved an "All-Kill" when he defeated all five players from Team Liquid. In July 2012, Team Zenex merged with StarTale. Life then participated in the Team Liquid StarLeague, where his performance over a span of five months led him to a second-place finish. The only match he lost throughout the tournament was to Jang "Creator" Hyun Woo in the finals.

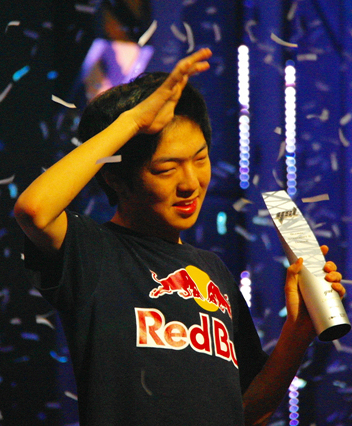
Life walked the Royal Road after winning the 2012 Season 4 GSL.

Following his participation in the Team Liquid StarLeague, Life made his debut in the Global StarCraft II League (GSL) Code S, the highest division of GSL, during GSL Season 4 in 2012. This season, Life achieved a feat known as "walking the Royal Road," a term used when a player secures a premier Korean title during their first qualification for competition. Throughout the season, Life displayed defeated players such as Lim "NesTea" Jae Duk, Ahn "Seed" Sang-wong, Lee "MarineKing" Jung-hoon, and TaeJa. In the grand finals of GSL Season 4, he faced off against Jung "Mvp" Jong-hun, a player who had won the third most premier StarCraft II tournaments at that time. Life won the series, four games to three, ultimately becoming the GSL champion. At 15 years old, he became the youngest player ever to secure a GSL championship and the first player to achieve the "Royal Roader" status in GSL history.

In the subsequent week following his GSL victory, Life won 2012 MLG Fall Championship in Dallas, Texas. He defeated Lee "Leenock" Dong-nyoung in the finals, despite initially trailing the match 1–3. This achievement made him the youngest player ever to secure an MLG championship. After returning to Korea to compete in the next GSL, Life faced a swift elimination within two weeks. One of the next tournaments he competed in was season five of the IGN Pro League (IPL5), held in Las Vegas, Nevada, in November 2012. He ultimately lost against Leenock and Jens "Snute" Aasgaard in the upper and lower brackets, respectively. While the IPL5 event was ongoing, the GSL World Championship exhibition series, a showmatch pitting Team Korea against Team World, took place, with Life competing as a member of Team Korea. In the first round, he won in his first match against Johan "Naniwa" Lucches, as Team Korea went on to win the round. In the second round, the winner was determined by the first team to secure five victories, with each match winner proceeding to face another player from the opposing team. Life, as the first representative of Team Korea, secured four consecutive victories. Although he lost his fifth match against Ilyes "Stephano" Satouri, Team Korea won the event.

Life's participation in the 2012 tournament circuit concluded with the GSL Blizzard Cup, an event featuring the top Korean players of that year. After advancing through the group stage, he defeated Park "DongRaeGu" Soo-ho and Leenock in the bracket stage, securing a place in the finals. In the championship match, he faced Won "Parting" Lee-sak. Parting took an early lead in the series by claiming victory in the first two games. However, Life won the following four matches to claim the tournament title.

=== Struggles and rebound (2013) ===
Early in 2013, Life secured a tournament victory at Iron Squid 2, after rallying back from a 0–3 deficit against Park "DRG" Soo-ho in the finals. During this period, the competitive landscape of StarCraft II was undergoing a transition from StarCraft II: Wings of Liberty to the new expansion, StarCraft II: Heart of the Swarm. Life's final tournament in the Wings of Liberty era was 2013 GSL Season 1, where he was eliminated during the group stage. He won his first Heart of the Swarm tournament at the 2013 MLG Winter after defeating Lee "Flash" Young-ho. This victory made him the first StarCraft player to win consecutive MLG Championship events. In April 2013, Life participated in the preliminary qualifiers for the 2013 Asian Indoor and Martial Arts Games, securing a spot at the event by defeating Flash in the qualifiers. However, due to a scheduling conflict with an upcoming MLG event, he was unable to attend the Asian Indoor and Martial Arts Games.

In the first of the three 2013 StarCraft II World Championship Series (WCS) seasons held in Korea, which was hosted by GSL, Life was eliminated during the group stage. This marked the third consecutive season in which he failed to progress beyond the round of 16. His performance in this event resulted in his relegation to the WCS Challenger League. However, he was qualified for the subsequent WCS season after defeating MarineKing in the Challenger League. Life continued to encounter difficulties throughout the rest of the year. In between WCS seasons, he participated in DreamHack Summer 2013, where he faced Jeffrey "Sjow" Brusi in a match where he was heavily favored to win but ultimately lost. Following the loss, Life's motivation appeared to wane, leading to a reduction in his practice regimen. Upon his return to Korea for the second WCS season of the year, this time hosted by the OnGameNet StarLeague (OSL), Life was eliminated after just two games, experiencing defeats by both Jung "Fantasy" Myung-hoon and Hwang "KangHo" Kang-ho. This once again relegated him to the Challenger League, where he was defeated in the round of 24 by Shin "hyvaa" Dae-kun. This early exit meant that Life would need to compete in the Up & Down matches, a qualifier tournament, in order to secure a spot in the following season's WCS Code S. In the Up & Down matches, Life lost his first two matches and ultimately failed to qualify for the next season's Code S tournament.

By the end of 2013, Life's competitive drive appeared to be rekindled, as he achieved success at several foreign events, reaching the semifinals or finals in four of them. In September, he traveled to Bucharest, Romania, to participate in his second DreamHack event. There, he reached the semifinals but was defeated by the eventual champion, Yun "TaeJa" Young-seo. Less than a month later, Life attended the Intel Extreme Masters New York 2013. After advancing past the group stage, he swept his opponents in both the quarterfinals and semifinals, securing a spot in the finals. In the championship match, he faced off against Naniwa and emerged victorious, claiming the IEM title with a 4–2 victory. In late December, Life travelled to Sweden for DreamHack Winter 2013. He reached the upper bracket finals, where he lost to TaeJa. However, after defeating Jo "Patience" Ji-hyun in the lower bracket finals, he earned a place in the grand finals. Ultimately, Life finished the event in second place, with TaeJa winning in the grand finals. At his final event in 2013, Life reached the semifinals at ASUS ROG NorthCon.

=== World champion (2014–2016) ===
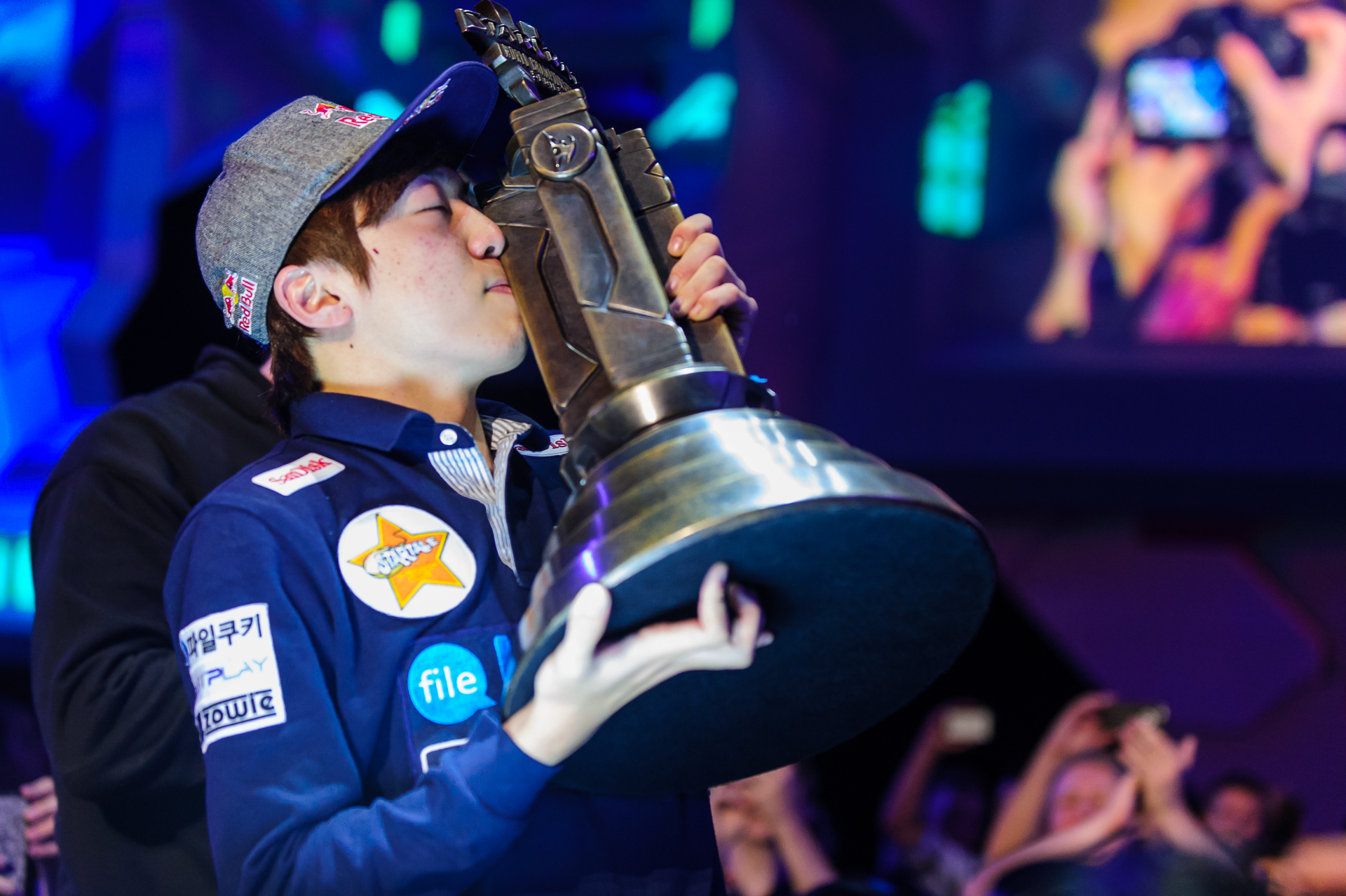
Life won the 2014 World Championship Series.

In the early months of 2014, Life qualified for Code S of GSL Season 1. During the tournament, he advanced to the semifinals where he lost to Eo "soO" Yoon-su. In April 2014, Life traveled to compete in DreamHack Bucharest 2014. Throughout the event, he lost only once during the group stage. Life won the event after defeating Kim "Impact" Joon-hyuk in the finals.

By the end of 2014, Life had accrued sufficient World Championship Points to secure a spot in the 2014 StarCraft II World Championship Series (WCS) at BlizzCon 2014, held in November. During the WCS tournament, he won his initial two matches, advancing him to the semifinals. In the semifinals, Life defeated TaeJa, who widely regarded as the strongest player remaining in the tournament. The championship match saw Life face Mun "MMA" Seong-won. In a 4–1 victory, he defeated MMA and clinched the 2014 championship title. Reflecting on his journey to the WCS title, Life said in a press conference, "[Last year] I had a lot of confidence in my skills, but since things didn't work out well this year, I have gotten more humble. Personally, being without that higher confidence level has been good for me. Because I can strive forward, work harder." At his final event in 2014, Life participated in DreamHack Winter 2014. He defeated TaeJa once again in the semifinals and finished the tournament in second place after losing to Park "ForGG" Ji-soo in the finals.

In January 2015, Life won IEM Taipei 2015. In this tournament, he achieved victory over Cho "Maru" Seong Ju in the finals, who was widely recognized as one of the top players at the time. The following month, he departed from StarTale and signed with KT Rolster. Life then participated in the 2015 GSL Season 1: Code S, where he ultimately defeated Parting and claimed the first-place title. Throughout the year, he maintained his competitive standing with top-four finishes in both the StarCraft II StarLeague (SSL) Season 1 and the KeSPA Cup, as well as a top-eight finish in SSL Season 2. However, it became apparent that Life's passion for the game began to wane once again by the end of 2015. Despite this, he had accumulated enough World Championship Points to secure a spot in the 2015 StarCraft II World Championship Series. In the event, Life reached the finals, facing off against Kim "sOs" Yoo Jin. He ultimately finished in second place, with a 3–4 loss in the finals.

In January 2016, Life signed with Afreeca Freecs. His professional StarCraft II career came to an end in 2016 when he received a lifetime ban from all Korean esports events due to his involvement in match-fixing activities. At the end of his career, Life had secured the second-highest number of premier StarCraft II tournament victories among all players and had accumulated the second largest prize money earnings in the competitive scene, amounting to around US$475,000.

== Match fixing ==
On January 29, 2016, the Korean e-Sports Association (KeSPA) released a statement announcing that Life was under investigation by the Changwon district prosecutors' office for his alleged involvement in match-fixing activities in professional StarCraft II matches. Three months later, on April 21, the Changwon Regional Prosecution Service special investigations division released a report confirming that Life, along with Jung "Bbyong" Woo-yong and 11 financial backers and brokers, had been convicted of match-fixing in two matches during the KeSPA Cup. As a result of this conviction, Life was sentenced to 18 months of imprisonment with a suspended sentence for three years. Additionally, he was fined ₩70,000,000 (approximately $58,000) as part of the legal consequences of his involvement. Furthermore, Life received a lifetime ban from participating in Korean esports events. The match-fixing scandal involving Life was regarded as the most disappointing event in esports in 2016 by ESPN.

== Accomplishments ==
World Championship Series

- One-time WCS Global Finals champion – 2014 (Note: According to the official Twitter account of StarCraft esports, Life's 2014 WCS championship was revoked.)

Global StarCraft II League

- Two-time GSL champion – 2012 Season Four, 2015 Season One
- One-time GSL Blizzard Cup champion – 2012

Other

- Two-time DreamHack champion – Bucharest 2014, Taipei 2015
- Two-time MLG champion – Fall 2012, Winter 2013
- One-time Iron Squid champion – 2013
- One-time IEM champion – New York 2013
- One-time IGN Pro Team League champion – 2012

== Notes ==
Preceded by Kim "sOs" Yoo Jin	StarCraft II World Championship Series winner 2014	Succeeded by Kim "sOs" Yoo Jin
