= 2013 StarCraft II World Championship Series =

Esports tournament

2013 StarCraft II World Championship Series Global Finals
- 2013

Tournament information
- Sport: StarCraft II
- Location: Anaheim, California
- Administrator: Blizzard Entertainment
- Venue(s): Anaheim Convention Center
- Purse: $250,000

Final positions
- Champion: Kim "sOs" Yoo Jin
- Runner-up: Lee "Jaedong" Jae-dong

The 2013 StarCraft II World Championship Series (WCS) is the 2013 edition of the StarCraft II World Championship Series, the highest level of esports competition for StarCraft II. The tournament series' Global Finals were won by South Korean professional player Kim "sOs" Yoo Jin.

== Format ==
The 2013 StarCraft II World Championship Series introduced large scale changes after the inaugural 2012 StarCraft II World Championship Series, turning the World Championship Series into the highest level of StarCraft II competition and culminating in the Global Finals at BlizzCon. Based on the format of the Global StarCraft II League (GSL), three Premier Leagues were formed - Korea, Europe, and America. Each region also contained a Challenger League that fed into Premier, in reaction to Korean dominance across all WCS leagues. Korea's WCS Premier League returned to Global StarCraft II League (GSL) branding, with all three seasons fully run by GOMTV, marking the end of the Ongamenet Starleague (OSL). All WCS leagues featured three seasons of regular play, with cross-regional Season Finals pitting the top-placing players of each region against each other.

Non-WCS events which covered some prize pool, online coverage, and qualification requirements were allowed to become sanctioned events and give out WCS Points to count towards qualification and seeding in the Global Finals.

=== Seeding ===
All sanctioned events, including Premier Leagues and non-WCS tournaments, gave out WCS Points to players based on their ranking and the event's WCS Points prize allocation. The sixteen highest-ranking players received invites to the Global Finals, seeded into a bracket based on their rank. As there were two players tied for the 16th seed, a tie-breaker match was held prior to the commencement of the Global Finals.

== Results ==
=== Global Finals ===
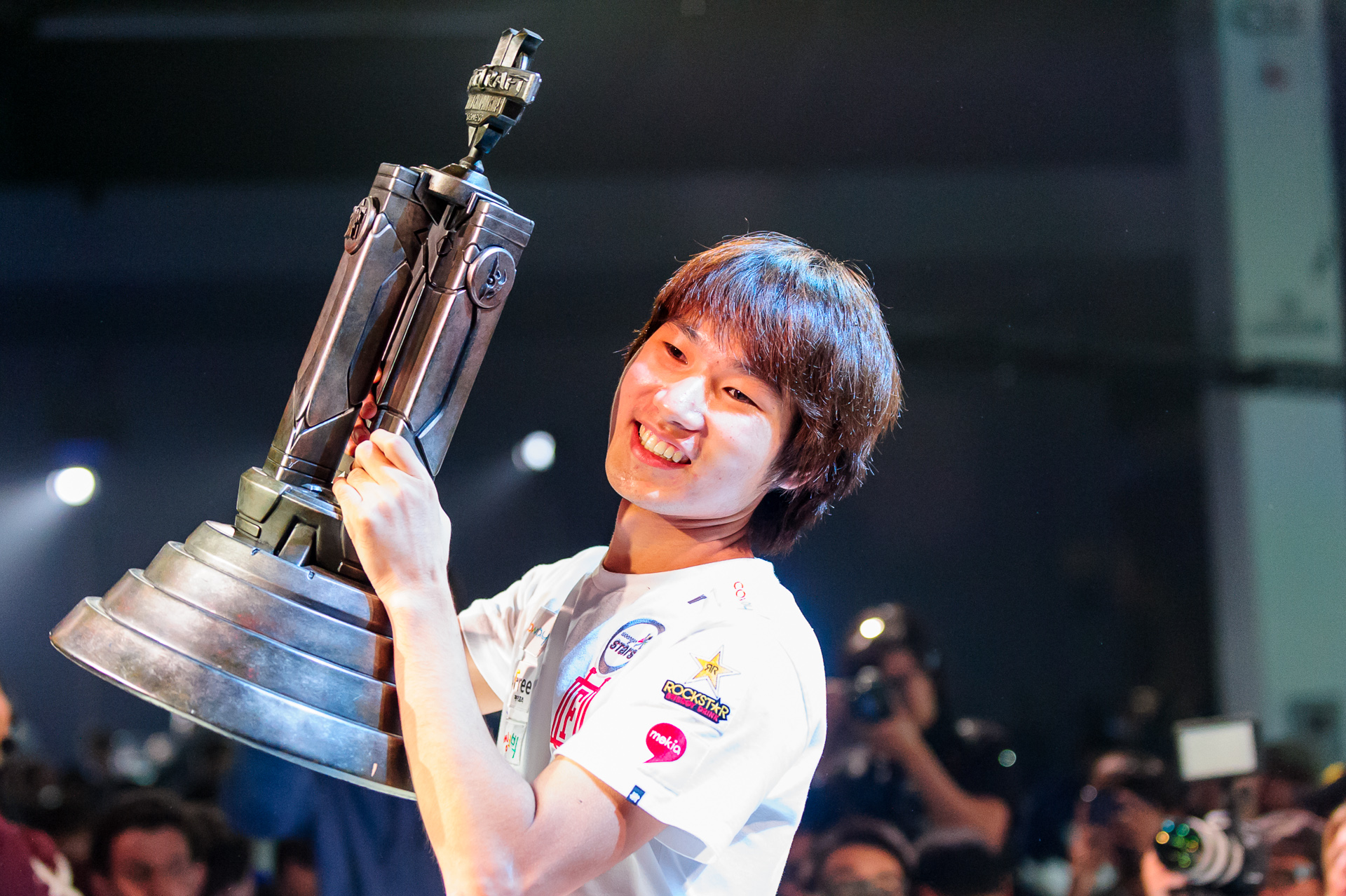
sOs won the 2013 WCS

The WCS Global Finals were held at the Anaheim Convention Center in Anaheim, California as part of BlizzCon 2013. They featured bracket play throughout the event, ending with Kim "sOs" Yoo Jin victorious.

Quarterfinals		Semifinals		Finals
(South Korea) Soulkey	1
(South Korea) Bomber	3	(South Korea) Bomber	1
(South Korea) sOs	3	(South Korea) sOs	3
(South Korea) Polt	1			(South Korea) sOs	4
(South Korea) Dear	2			(South Korea) Jaedong	1
(South Korea) Jaedong	3	(South Korea) Jaedong	3
(South Korea) Maru	3	(South Korea) Maru	1
(South Korea) duckdeok	2
