= The Amazing Race: China Rush 1 =

Season of television series

- Season 1
- Presented by: Allan Wu
- No. of teams: 10
- Winners: Charlie Gale & Rachel Chen
- No. of legs: 12
- No. of episodes: 12

Release
- Original network: ICS
- Original release: August 8 – October 30, 2010

Additional information
- Filming dates: April 28 – June 3, 2010

Season chronology
- Next → Season 2

The Amazing Race: China Rush 1 (Chinese: 极速前进：冲刺！中国; pinyin: Jísù Qiánjìn: Chōngcì! Zhōngguó) is the first season of The Amazing Race: China Rush, a Chinese reality competition show based on the American series The Amazing Race. It featured 10 teams of two, each with a pre-existing relationship, in a race across 11 cities in China to win a world tour provided by Travelzen. It is the third Asian version of the franchise, after The Amazing Race Asia and HaMerotz LaMillion. The host of the show was Allan Wu, who also hosted the Asian version as well.

The Amazing Race: China Rush premiered on ICS on Sunday, August 8, 2010 at 8:00 p.m. (UTC+8).

Australian and American "flirtatious friends" Charlie Gale and Rachel Chen were the winners of this season.

== Production ==
=== Development and filming ===
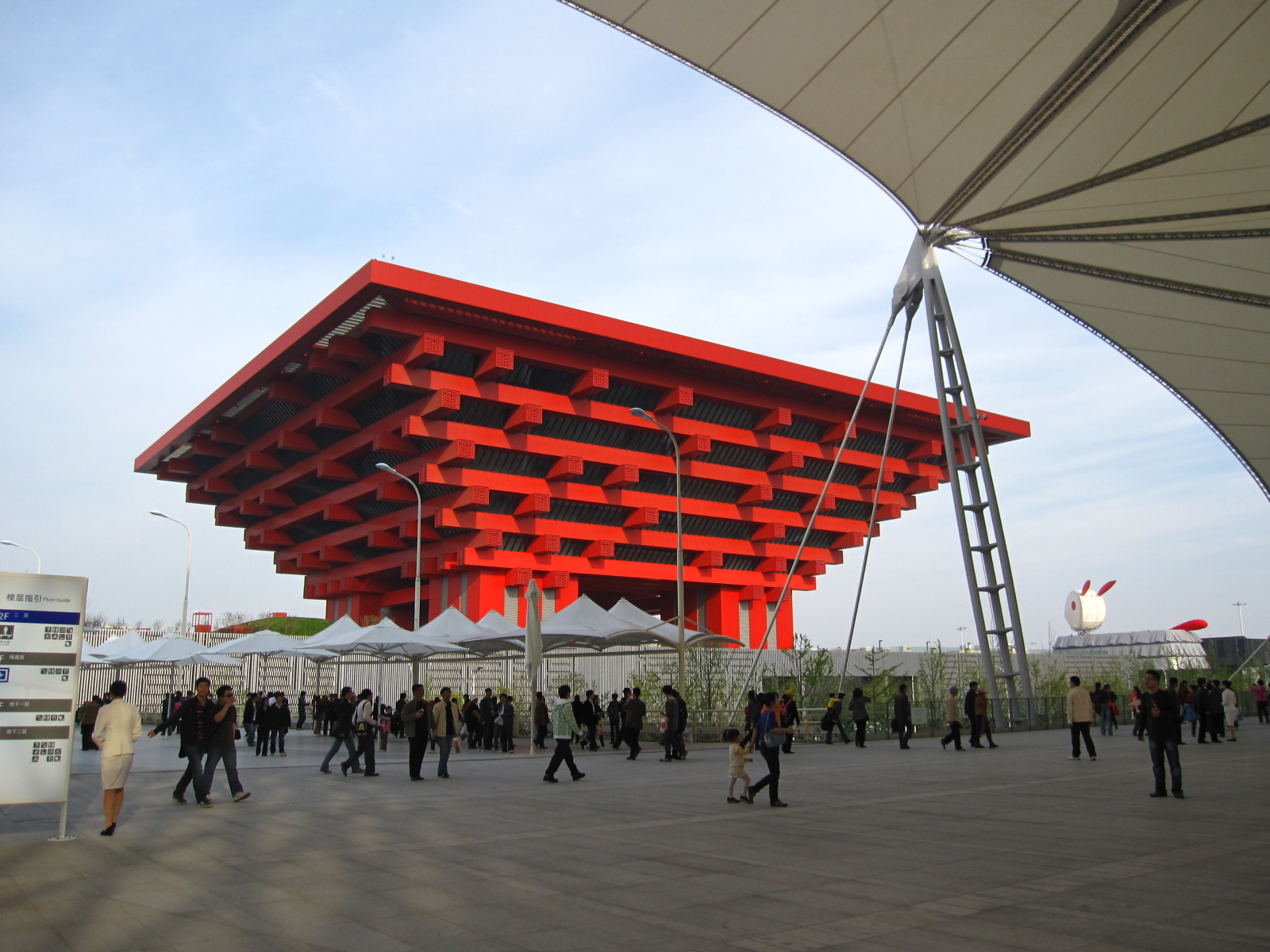
Teams began a race across China at Shanghai Expo Park.

In 2010, the Chinese TV network International Channel Shanghai acquired the rights to produce a version for its territories. The show was produced by Shanghai-based production company Fly Films. International Channel Shanghai had previously attempted to make their own version of the show entitled Shanghai Rush.

Filming took place between April 28 and June 3, 2010.

In this season, instead of flipping an hourglass, teams that have been forced to Yield had to wait until a spiral of incense finished burning, which took 15 minutes. This season was the first time an Amazing Race franchise had three non-elimination legs in a row, as the American and Asian editions have never had more than two in a row. It was also the first one to not offer any Fast Forward clues (the 14th American edition had an unaired Fast Forward was the first season to do so, and 18th American edition was the first American season overall not to offer any Fast Forward clue).

=== Casting ===
Applications for the first season ended April 16, 2010 (extended from the original deadline on March 29, 2010).

=== Broadcasting ===
Episode 2 which scheduled to air on August 15, 2010 was delayed to subsequent week due to National Mourning Day in China for Gansu mudslide victims.

=== Marketing ===
The Amazing Race: China Rush had eight official sponsors: CIIC, Double Tree, Hamilton, Hilton, New Balance, Organic Food, Travelzen and Shanghai International Automobile City.

== Cast ==
The 10 teams, all composed of expats living in China, were announced in a press release on April 27, 2010.

Karen is currently the first ever Canadian to be on any of the Amazing Race seasons representing Canada (Canadian citizens Tisha Silang, Natalie Glebova and Vince Chung from The Amazing Race Asia 3 were representing Philippines, Thailand and Hong Kong respectively). Rick, Joshua and Charlie are the first Australians to represent their country (similarly, Australian citizens Brett Money of The Amazing Race Asia 2, Henry Chan and Bernie Chan of The Amazing Race Asia 3 were representing Indonesia and Malaysia respectively), Paul & Francis are the first team from an African country (Kenya), and Janis, Aleksandra (Latvia) and Sarah (England) are the first Europeans to represent their home countries (British citizens Andy Lawson, Laura Kluk, Francesca von Etzdorf and Howard Bicknell from The Amazing Race Asia 1 represented Thailand, Hong Kong and Sri Lanka respectively and Frenchwoman Aurelia Chenat of The Amazing Race Asia 2 represented Hong Kong).

Janis Vaisla died on January 9, 2016, after being diagnosed with cardiac amyloidosis and while waiting for a heart transplant in Berlin, at the age of 46.

Contestants	Age	Relationship	Hometown	Status
Paul Lebeneiyo	27	Maasai Warriors	Rift Valley, Kenya	Eliminated 1st (in Wuxi, Jiangsu)
Francis Merinyi	31	Maasai Warriors	Rift Valley, Kenya	Eliminated 1st (in Wuxi, Jiangsu)
Miguel Villaneuva	27	Amigos	Mexico City, Mexico	Eliminated 2nd (in Changzhou, Jiangsu)
Hector Valenzuela	31	Amigos	Mexico City, Mexico	Eliminated 2nd (in Changzhou, Jiangsu)
Janis Vaisla	40	Reality TV Veterans	Riga, Latvia	Eliminated 3rd (in Yangzhou, Jiangsu)
Aleksandra Kurusova	24	Reality TV Veterans	Riga, Latvia	Eliminated 3rd (in Yangzhou, Jiangsu)
Bonnie Wisnewski	54	Expat Wives	United States	Eliminated 4th (in Beijing)
Mel Plumi	54	Expat Wives	Arizona, United States	Eliminated 4th (in Beijing)
Sean Slaughter	27	Newly Dating	United States	Eliminated 5th (in Tai'an, Shandong)
Amy Bromstead	32	Newly Dating	San Francisco, California	Eliminated 5th (in Tai'an, Shandong)
Sarah Edson	24	Ultra-Marathoners	London, United Kingdom	Eliminated 6th (in Tengchong, Yunnan)
Molly Fitzpatrick	34	Ultra-Marathoners	San Francisco, California	Eliminated 6th (in Tengchong, Yunnan)
Lisa Chiang	38	Momshells	United States	Eliminated 7th (in Zhaoqing, Guangdong)
Karen Spencer	45	Momshells	Vancouver, Canada	Eliminated 7th (in Zhaoqing, Guangdong)
Deepak Noutiyal	29	Cricket Fanatics	India	Third Place
Naresh Ludhani	30	Cricket Fanatics	India	Third Place
Rick Liston	25	Best Mates	Melbourne, Australia	Second Place
Josh Ogilvie	29	Best Mates	Melbourne, Australia	Second Place
Charlie Gale	26	Flirtatious Friends	Australia	Winners
Rachel Chen	25	Flirtatious Friends	United States	Winners

== Results ==
The following teams participated in the season, with their relationships at the time of filming. Note this table does not necessarily reflect all content broadcast on television due to inclusion or exclusion of some data. Placements are listed in finishing order.

Team	Position (by leg)												Roadblocks performed
Team	1	2	3	4	5	6	7	8	9	10	11	12	Roadblocks performed
Charlie & Rachel	1st	3rd^{1}	2nd	1st	4th	1st	2nd	1st	5th	4th	1st	1st	Charlie 6, Rachel 6
Rick & Josh	3rd	1st	1st	3rd	1st	5th	1st	3rd	2nd	1st	3rd	2nd	Rick 6, Josh 6
Deepak & Naresh	9th	5th^{2}	5th	4th	6th	3rd	4th	5th⊂	4th	3rd	2nd	3rd	Deepak 6, Naresh 6
Lisa & Karen	5th	8th	8th	5th>	5th	4th	5th	4th⊃	3rd	2nd	4th		Lisa 5, Karen 6
Sarah & Molly	4th	4th	4th	6th	3rd	2nd	3rd	2nd	1st	5th^{3}			Sarah 5^{3}, Molly 5
Sean & Amy	2nd	2nd	3rd	2nd	2nd	6th							Sean 3, Amy 3
Bonnie & Mel	7th	6th	6th	7th	7th								Bonnie 2, Mel 3
Janis & Aleksandra	6th	7th	7th	8th<									Janis 2, Aleksandra 2
Miguel & Hector	8th	9th	9th										Miguel 2, Hector 1
Paul & Francis	10th	10th											Paul 1, Francis 1

Key

- A red team placement indicates that the team was eliminated.
- An underlined blue team placement indicates that the team came in last on a non-elimination leg and had to perform a Speed Bump task in the following leg.
- A yellow > indicates that the team chose to use the Yield; < indicates the team who received it.
- A brown ⊃ indicates means the team chose to use a U-Turn; ⊂ indicates the team who received it.

Notes

1. Charlie & Rachel initially arrived 2nd, but were issued a 30-minute penalty as Charlie helped Rachel in the Roadblock. Sean & Amy checked in during the penalty time, dropping Charlie & Rachel to 3rd.
2. Deepak & Naresh initially arrived 4th, but were issued a 15-minute penalty for taking a golf cart instead of walking to the Pit Stop. Sarah & Molly checked in during the penalty time, dropping Deepak & Naresh to 5th.
3. Sarah failed to complete the Roadblock in Leg 10. After Sarah's second attempt and after all other teams had already checked in at the Pit Stop, Allan came out to the Roadblock location to inform them of their elimination.

== Prizes ==
The prize for each leg is awarded to the first place team for that leg. All trips are sponsored by TravelZen.

- Leg 1 – A three-day, two-night trip for two to Hangzhou.
- Leg 2 – A three-day, two-night trip for two to Xiamen.
- Leg 3 – A three-day, two-night trip for two to Hong Kong.
- Leg 4 – A three-day, two-night trip for two to Xi'an.
- Leg 5 – A three-day, two-night trip for two to Inner Mongolia.
- Leg 6 – A six-day, five-night trip for two to Mount Huang, Mount Lu and Mount Hua.
- Leg 7 – A three-day, two-night trip for two to Macau.
- Leg 8 – A three-day, two-night trip for two to Lhasa.
- Leg 9 – A six-day, five-night trip for two to Taiwan.
- Leg 10 – A six-day, five-night trip for two to Yunnan.
- Leg 11 – Roundtrip tickets to 10 destinations.
- Leg 12 – World Trip

== Race summary ==
Route Map.

Destinations	Air travel Rail travel Water travel Bus travel Helicopter travel Bicycle travel Gondola travel
Route Markers	Detour Roadblock Yield U-Turn Speed Bump Pit Stop

=== Leg 1 (Shanghai → Zhejiang) ===
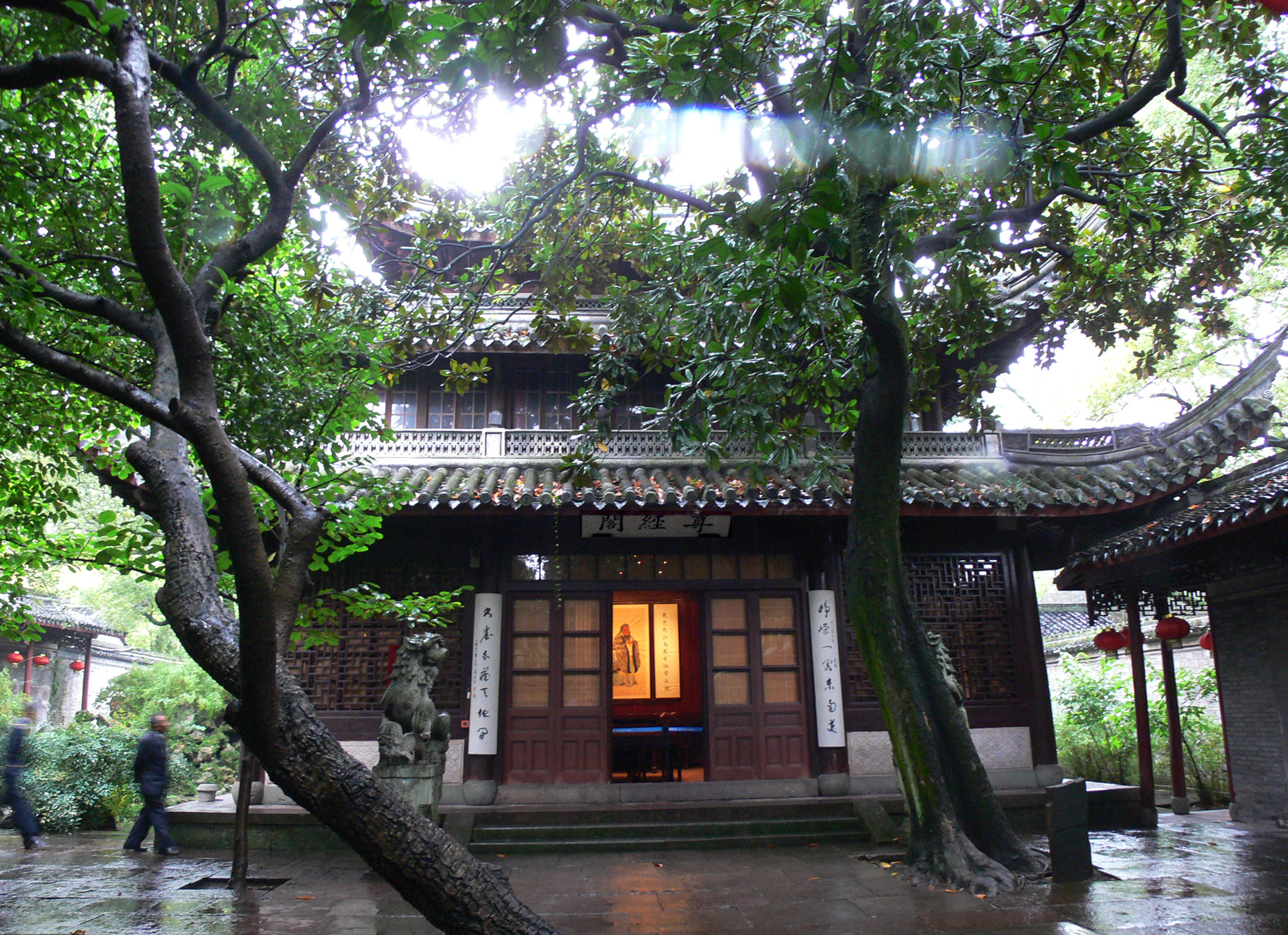
Tianyi Chamber was visited on the first leg of The Amazing Race: China Rush.

Airdate: August 8, 2010

- Shanghai, China (Shanghai Expo Park) (Starting Line)
- Shanghai (Shanghai South Railway Station) to Ningbo, Zhejiang (Ningbo Railway Station)
- Ningbo (Zhenbao Fang Restaurant)
- Ningbo (Lao Waitan) (Overnight Rest)
- Ningbo (Strawberry Farm)
- Ningbo (Dongqian Lake)
- Ningbo (Tianyi Chamber)
- Ningbo (Ningbo Scenic Waterfront)
- Ningbo (Ningbo Grand Theater)

In this series' first Roadblock, one team member had to eat a turtle, leaving nothing but the shell, to receive their next clue.

Additional tasks

- At the Shanghai South railway station, teams had to find a lady with an orange umbrella for tickets to their next destination.
- At Lao Wai Tan, teams picked departure times for next day.
- At the strawberry farm, teams had to pick five kilograms (11 lb) of strawberries to receive their next clue.
- At Dongqian Lake, teams had to play a game of paintball and pick up all 10 same colored flag to receive their next clue.
- At Ningbo Scenic Waterfront, teams had to complete a 100 pieces puzzle to receive their next clue.

=== Leg 2 (Zhejiang → Jiangsu) ===
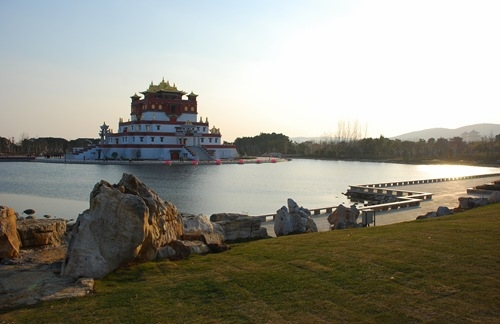
Teams ended the second leg at Lingshan "Five-signets" Palace, at Wuxi, Jiangsu.

Airdate: August 22, 2010

- Ningbo (Ningbo Bus Station) to Wuxi, Jiangsu (Wuxi Bus Station)
- Wuxi (Nanchan Temple)
- Wuxi (Dama Tofu Shop)
- Wuxi (3 Kingdoms Movie Studio)
- Wuxi (Turtle Head Park)
- Wuxi (Lingshan Buddha)
- Wuxi (Lingshan "Five-signets" Palace)

In this leg's Roadblock, one team member had to choose a brick and find its matching halve from 1000 different bricks to receive their next clue.

For their Speed Bump, Paul & Francis had to each make a clay tea cup before they could continue racing.

This series' first Detour was a choice between Warriors Strength or Warriors Skill. In Warriors Strength, teams had to take a boat to an island, perform a ladder climb, and rappel from other side to receive their next clue. In Warriors Skill, teams had to hit a bullseye using spears and arrows from the distance of 10 metres (33 ft) to receive their next clue.

Additional tasks

- At Nanchan Temple, teams had to take a boat down the river and find a building with three green colored lanterns on it.
- In Turtle Head Park, teams had to search the garden for the clue box.
- In Lingshan Temple, teams had to search for the smaller version of Buddha to find their next clue.
- In Lingshan Temple, teams had to climb 88m (217 steps) and correctly count all the flower pots decorating the monument (1509) to receive their next clue from a monk.

=== Leg 3 (Jiangsu) ===
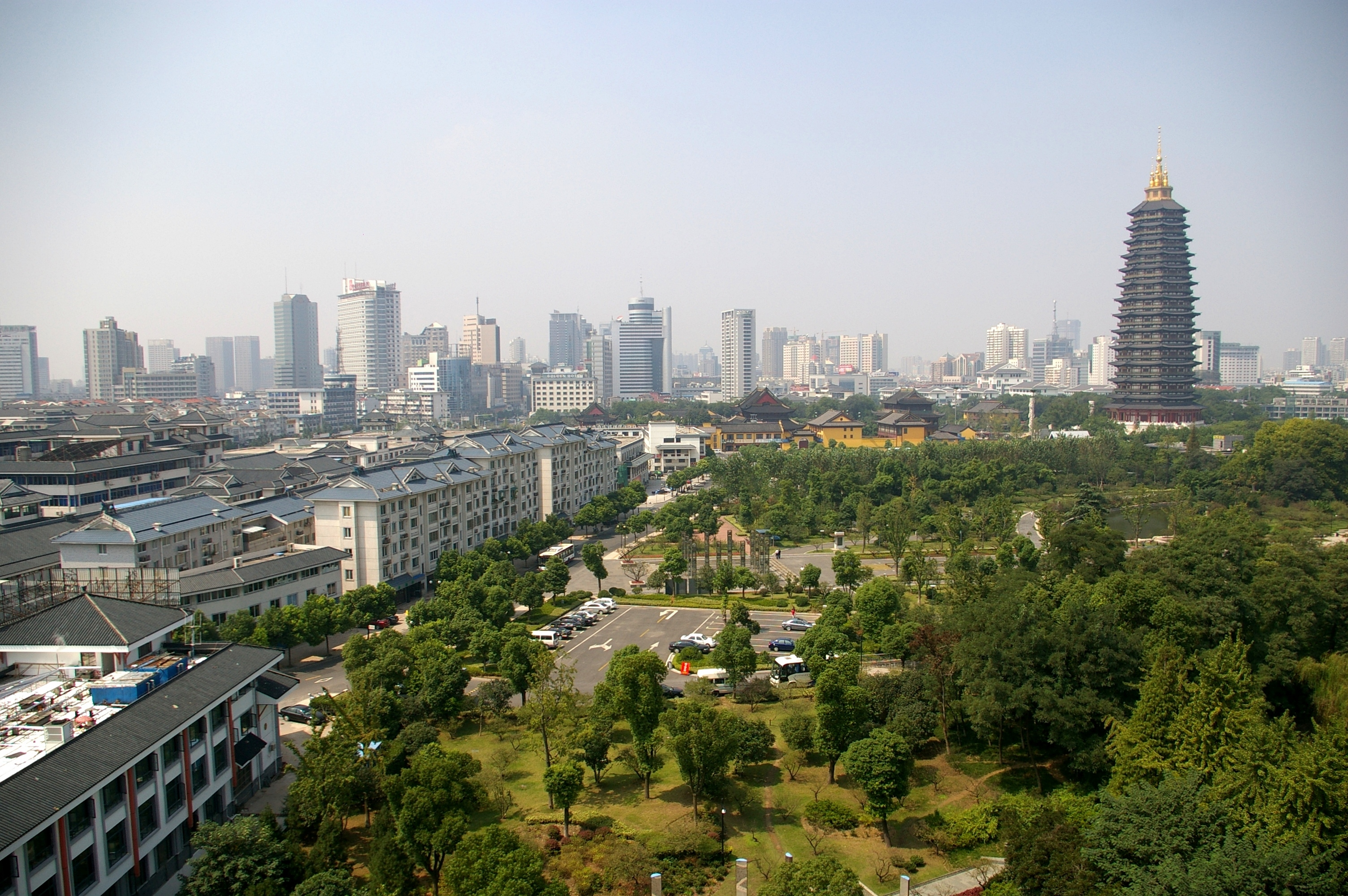
Teams traveled to the city of Changzhou for this leg.

Airdate: August 29, 2010

- Wuxi (Wuxi Railway Station) to Changzhou (Changzhou Railway Station)
- Changzhou (Qingfeng Sports Park)
- Changzhou (Changzhou Comb Factory)
- Changzhou (Miduqiao Primary School)
- Changzhou (City Wall)
- Changzhou (Baguo Buyi Restaurant)
- Changzhou (Yancheng Remains)

This leg's Detour was a choice between Rock or Roll. In Rock, teams took a boat across a lake and climbed to the top of the climbing wall to receive their next clue. In Roll, teams located a bicycle cart with a skateboard. One team member then had to take control of the bicycle and cycle around the park to the skating park while the other rode on the skateboard. Once at the skating park, they will receive their next clue.

In this leg's Roadblock, one team member had to navigate a boat through currents to the other side of the jetty, retrieve a flag and return the boat back in order to receive the next clue.

Additional tasks

- At Qingfeng Sports Park, teams found their next clue at the top of a staircase.
- In Changzhou Comb Factory, teams had to search for one out of nine combs which have Chinese characters "常州"(Changzhou). Afterwards, they proceeded to Miduqiao Primary School and had to comb and tie the hair of ten female students to receive their next clue from the teacher.
- In Baguo Buyi Restaurant, teams played a game of baijiu roulette where a rotating plate with a clue was spun. If the racer received the wine, teams had to finish it before they could play again and play until they spun onto the next clue.

=== Leg 4 (Jiangsu) ===
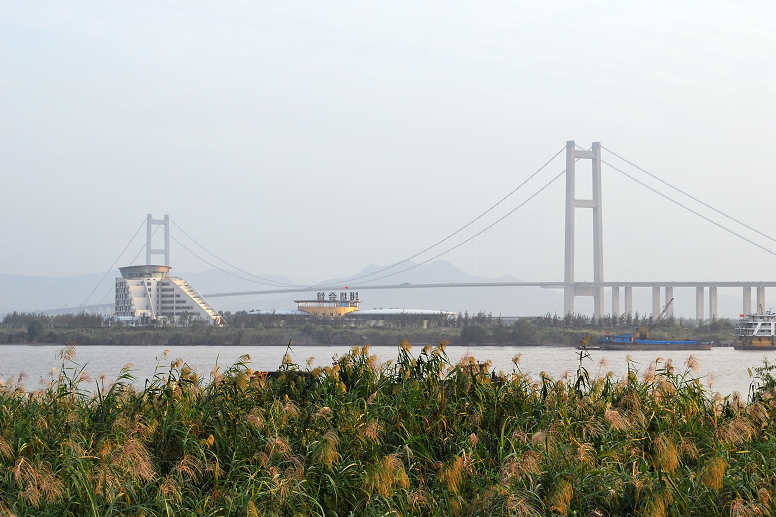
Teams visited the Runyang Bridge in this leg.

Airdate: September 5, 2010

- Changzhou (Runyang Bridge)
- Yangzhou (Ge Gardens)
- Yangzhou (Dongguan Street)
- Yangzhou (Yangzhou Ren Jia International Hotel)
- Yangzhou (Yangzhou Railway Station – Platform 1)

This leg's Detour was a choice between Blade or Brush. In Blade, one team member had to cut out the shape of Haibao, the mascot of Expo 2010, while the other team member traced and cut out the background. In Brush, one team member had to correctly write out a specific Chinese character, while the other reproduced a painting of a bamboo grove.

In this leg's Roadblock, one team member had to finish a 1.5-kilogram (3.3 lb) serving of Yangzhou's famous fried rice to receive their next clue.

Additional task

- At Runyang Bridge, teams received their next clue at the top of the bridge.

=== Leg 5 (Jiangsu → Beijing) ===
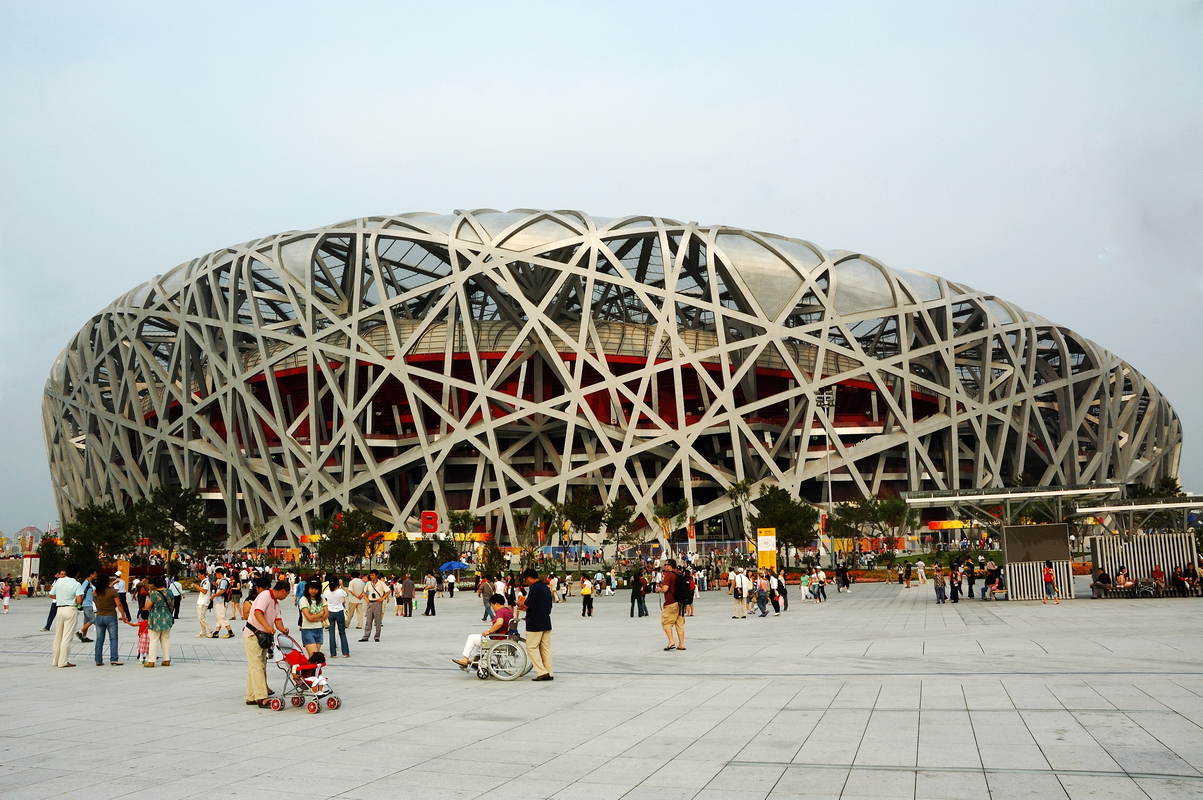
Teams performed an Olympic-styled Detour at the Beijing National Stadium, known locally as the 'Bird's Nest'.

Airdate: September 12, 2010

- Changzhou (Changzhou Railway Station) to Beijing (Beijing Railway Station)
- Beijing (Summer Palace – Nanhu Island)
- Beijing (Quanjude)
- Beijing (798 Art District)
- Beijing (Yan Club Arts Center)
- Beijing (Beijing National Stadium)
- Beijing (Great Wall of China – Badaling)

In this leg's Roadblock, one team member had to properly carve a Peking Roast Duck to the head chef's satisfaction to receive their next clue. If the duck was improperly cut, team members had to chop 10 leeks before making another attempt.

This leg's Olympic Games-themed Detour was a choice between Go for Gold or Go for Goal. In Go for the Gold, teams had to search amongst thousands of seats within the stadium's first and third levels to find one of seven gold medals to receive their next clue. In Go for the Goal, one team member had to execute a penalty shot with a soccer ball, while the other team member had to rebound it into an unguarded goal using only their head to receive their next clue.

Additional tasks

- In 798 art district, teams had to search for a large sculpture of a red monster that was holding the clue box.
- At the Yan Club Arts Center, teams had to participate in a team building communication exercise. One team member would be provided a drawing, while the other team member was prevented from seeing the aforementioned drawing. The latter team member had to recreate the drawing, using only verbal cues from their partner, to receive their next clue from a CIIC communications analyst.

=== Leg 6 (Beijing → Shandong) ===
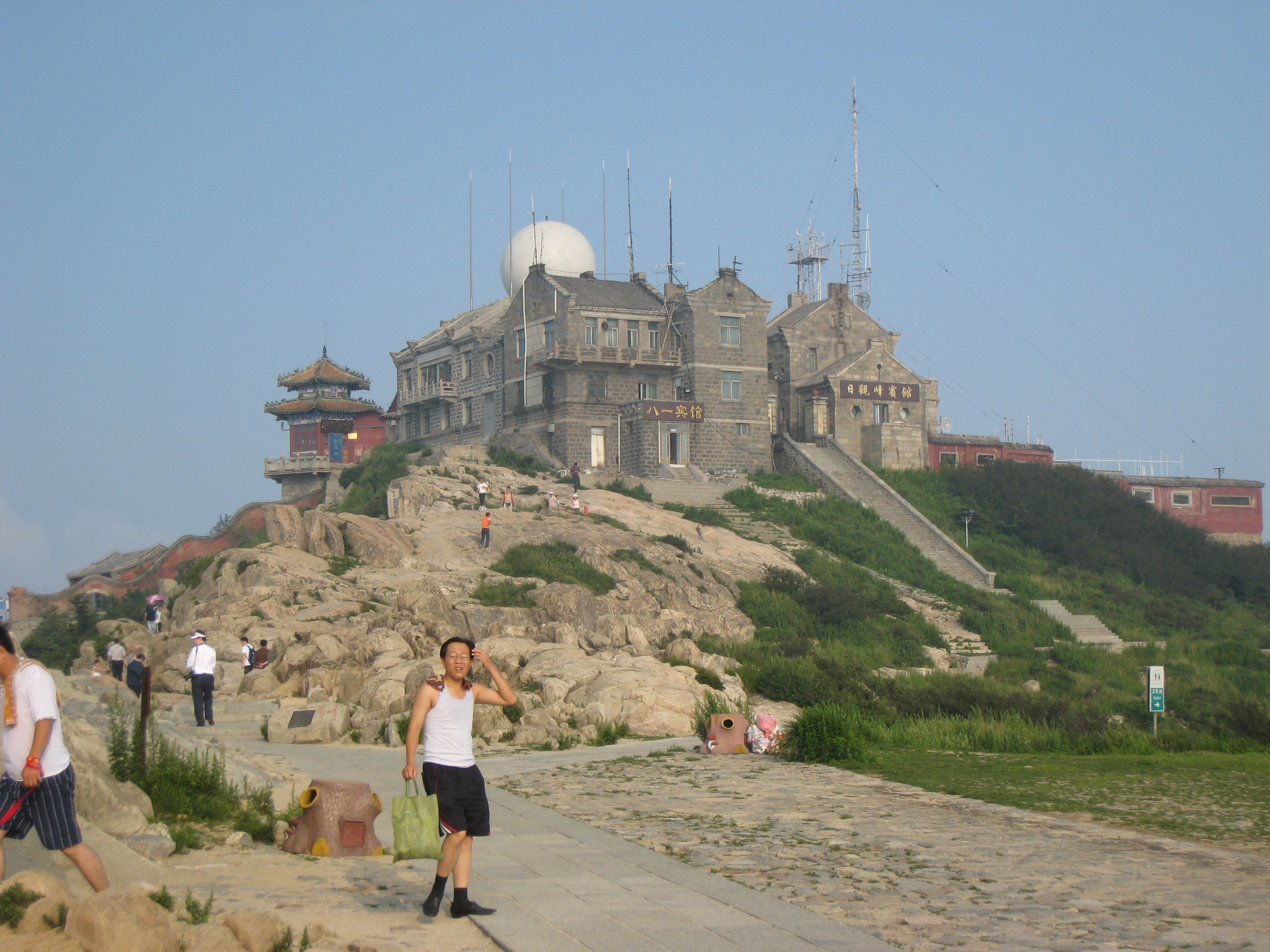
Mount Tai was the site of both the Detour and the Pit Stop in Shandong.

Airdate: September 19, 2010

- Beijing (Beijing South Railway Station) to Tai'an, Shandong (Tai'an Railway Station)
- Tai'an (Dai Temple)
- Tai'an (Tianwaicun Square)
- Tai'an (Dragon Reservoir Dam)
- Tai'an (Fengshan Dadian)
- Tai'an (Taishan Stone Shop)
- Tai'an (Mount Tai)
- Tai'an (Peak of Mount Tai)

In this leg's Roadblock, one team member had to scale the Dragon Reservoir Dam and make their way to a nearby pavilion to receive the next clue.

This leg's Detour was a choice between Trees or Keys. In Trees, teams had to plant a sapling tree to receive their next clue. In Keys, teams had to use one of the keys to open a lock to receive their next clue.

Additional tasks

- In Dai Temple, teams had to search for the clue box in the compound of the temple.
- At Fengshan Dadian, teams dressed up in traditional costume and had to travel by foot along a marked path to the stage area. Once there, they had to bow to the empress to receive their next clue.
- At Taishan Stone Shop, teams had to search for a hidden stone tablet inscribed with the Chinese characters for "China Rush" in order to receive their next clue. Afterwards, teams were instructed to carry the tablet and travel to Mount Tai via shuttle bus and cable-car. At the summit, they could drop off the tablet in exchange for their next clue. If teams broke the tablet before they reach the submit, they must go back to the shop and collect the tablet again.

=== Leg 7 (Shandong) ===
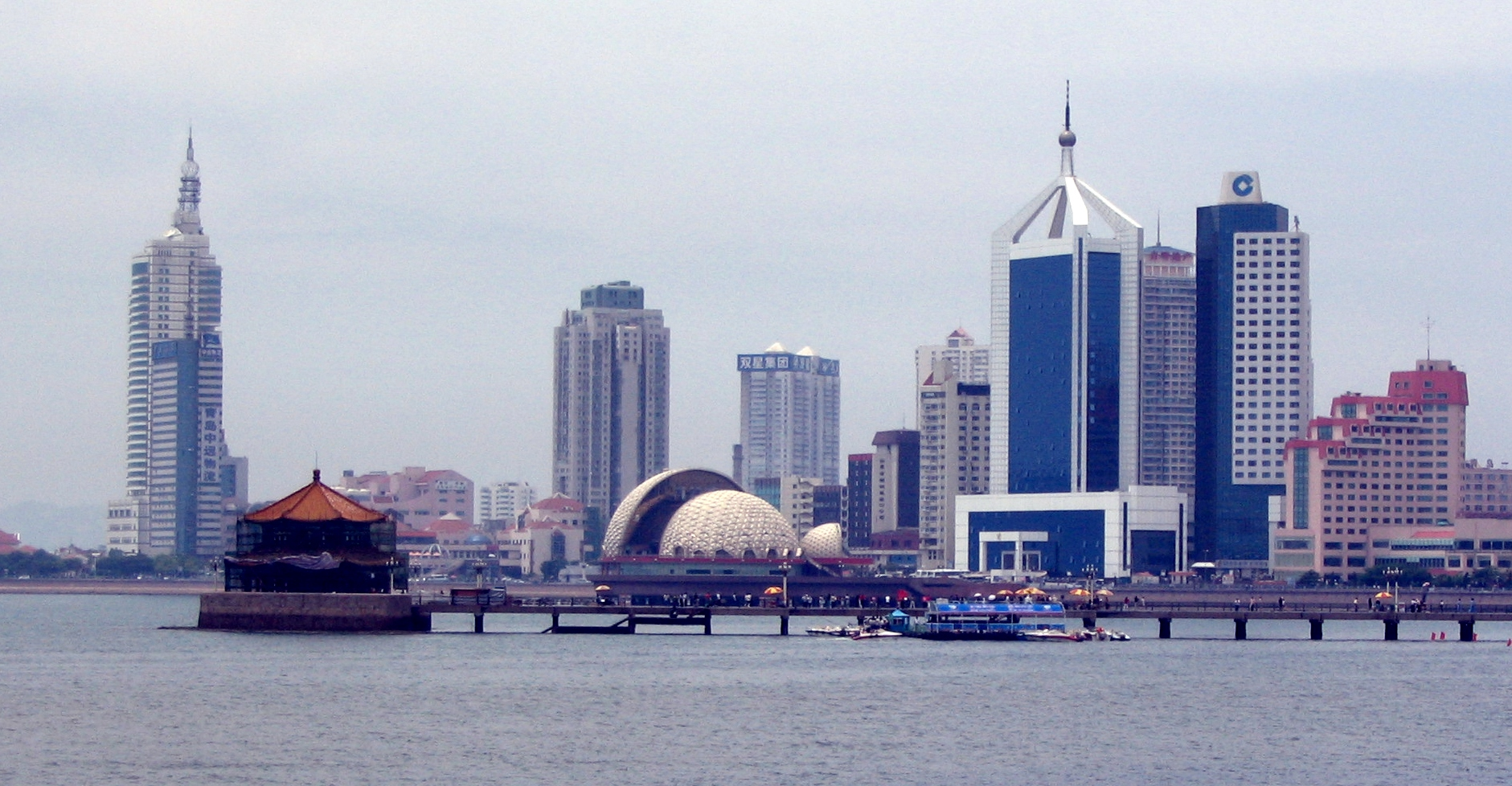
The skyline of Zhanqiao Pier was the backdrop of the leg's Pit Stop.

Airdate: September 26, 2010

- Tai'an (Tai'an Railway Station) to Qingdao (Qingdao Railway Station)
- Qingdao (Mount Lao) (Pit Start)
- Qingdao (Polar Ocean World)
- Qingdao (Badaguan Beach)
- Qingdao (Badaguan Beach or Qingdao Beer Street)
- Qingdao (Zhanqiao Pier) to Jiaozhou Bay (Yacht)

In this leg's Roadblock, one team member had to scuba dive in Polar Ocean World's tank and search for seven red letters (A, B, A, L, O, N, E). Once done, that team member had to spell out the word on paper to receive their next clue.

This leg's Detour was a choice between Buried Metal or Carried Metal. In Buried Metal, teams had to search a compass in the sand using a metal detector to receive their next clue. In Carried Metal, teams had to make their way to the Qingdao Beer Street, once there, they had to transport six full kegs from one end of the street to the other to receive their next clue.

Additional tasks

- At Polar Ocean World, teams had to prepare 20 kilograms (44 lb) of fish and then they had to feed a whale to receive their next clue. Afterwards, they had to retrieve their Roadblock information from the observation tunnel.
- At Zhanqiao Pier, teams had to ride a motorboat to the Pit Stop.

Additional note

- During the Pit Stop, teams traveled by train from Tai'an to Qingdao to begin the leg.

=== Leg 8 (Shandong → Sichuan) ===
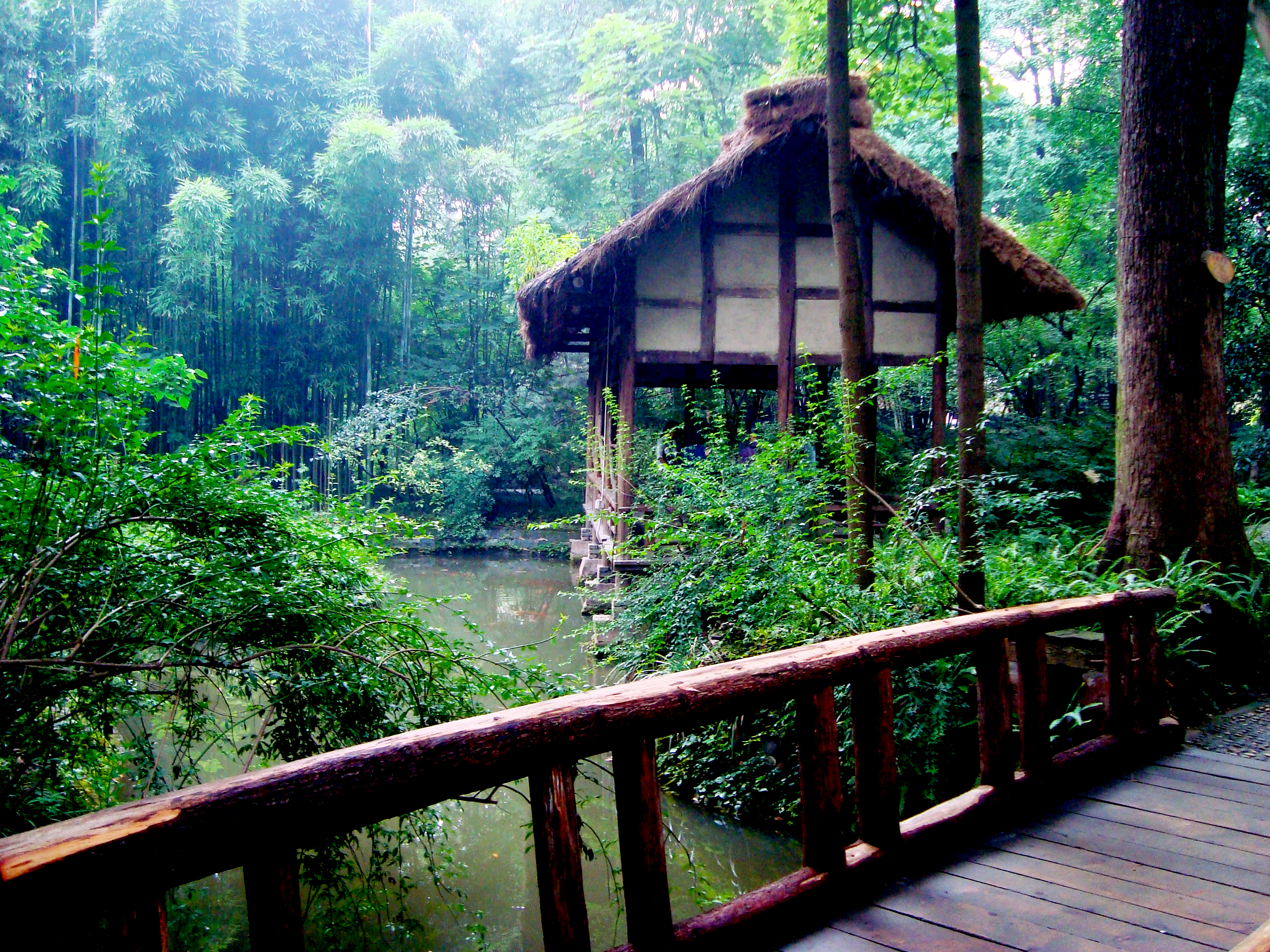
Racers completed the leg's Roadblock at the Du Fu Thatched Cottage.

Airdate: October 3, 2010

- Qingdao (Qingdao Olympic Sailing Center)
- Qingdao (Qingdao Liuting International Airport) to Chengdu, Sichuan (Chengdu Shuangliu International Airport)
- Chengdu (People's Square)
- Chengdu (Hot Pot Restaurant or Historic Lanes)
- Chengdu (Tianfu Square)
- Chengdu (Du Fu Thatched Cottage)
- Chengdu (Chunxi Road)

For their Speed Bump, Karen & Lisa had to both have their ears cleaned using traditional ear cleaning tools, which are, in essence, pieces of cotton on sticks of wire, before they could proceed to the Detour.

This leg's Detour was a choice between Hot Pot or Tea Pot. In Hot Pot, teams traveled to the Hot Pot Restaurant, where they had to eat a family-sized serving of meat, cocoa, lettuce, which was dipped in Sichuan's famous fiery Hot Pot soup, and a side serving of diced red peppers. Finally, they would have to find a Face-Changer to receive their next clue. In Tea Pot, teams traveled to a historic part of the area and then, with the assistance of two tea masters, had to properly pour tea into seven teacups per team member using ancient tea pots with long spouts to receive their next clue.

In this leg's Roadblock, one team member had to search the entire 24-acre (97,000 m^{2}) area of the Du Fu Cottage to find a scroll which could be traded for the next clue. For the task, the cottage was in complete darkness, and that team member could only use a single flashlight to navigate.

Additional task

- At the Qingdao Olympic Sailing Center, teams had to properly rig a sail onto a sailboat. If successful, the sailboat would take the team to a raft where they would receive their next clue.

=== Leg 9 (Sichuan) ===
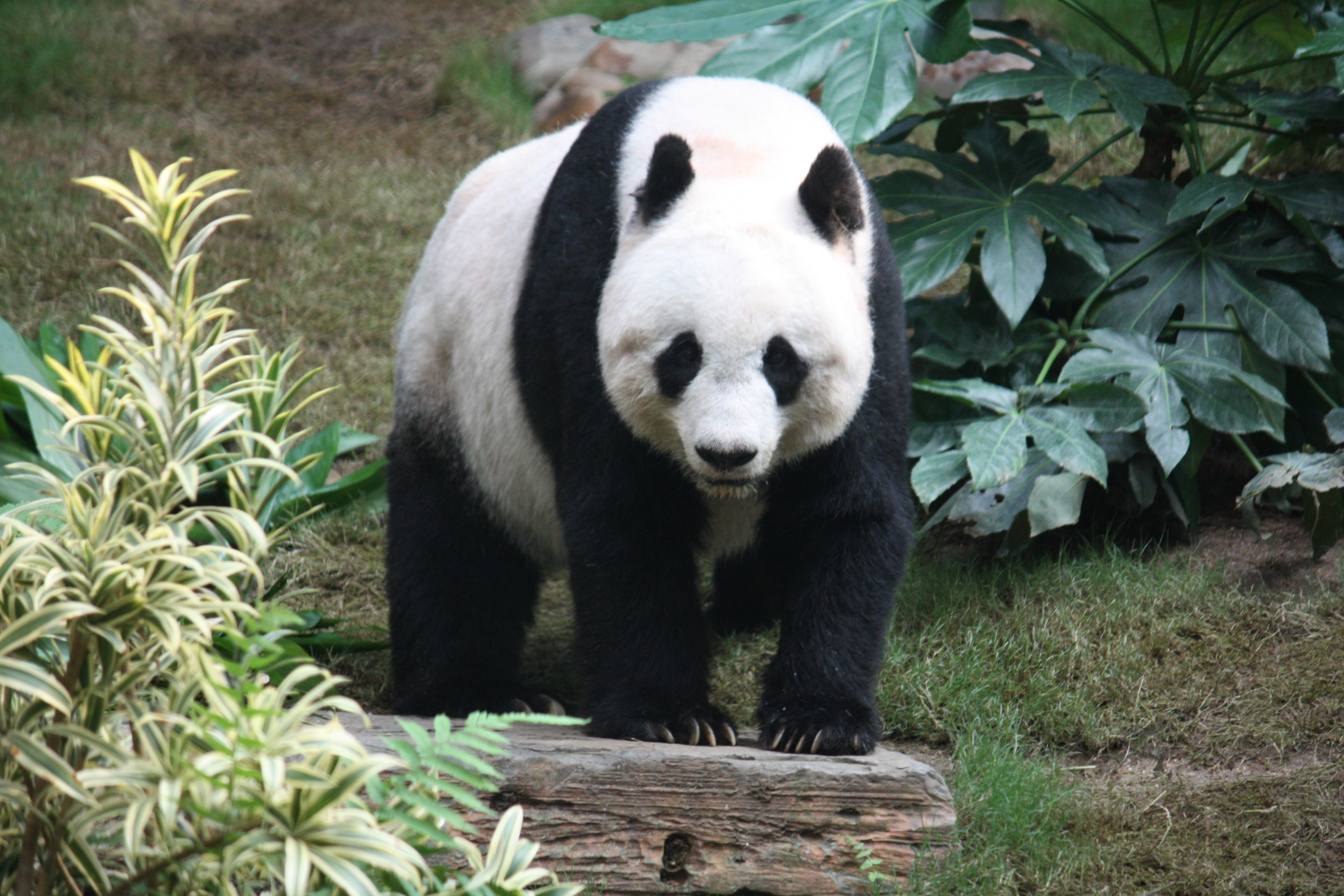
One team member participated a panda-feeding Roadblock for this leg.

Airdate: October 10, 2010

- Chengdu (Living Water Park)
- Chengdu (Chengdu Research Base of Giant Panda Breeding)
- Chengdu to Dujiangyan
- Dujiangyan (Lidui Park)
- Dujiangyan (Hongkou Primary School)
- Dujiangyan (Miaoba Rafting Pier)

In this leg's Roadblock, one team member would have to wash 10 kilograms (22 lb) of bamboo leaves to clean it and then bring it all to the panda feeding area to receive their next clue. If at any point the leaves drop to the ground along the way, the racer would have to start over.

For their Speed Bump, Deepak & Naresh had to learn and recite a song about Dujiangyan, before they could proceed to the Detour.

This leg's Detour was a choice between Face Detection or Face Detention. In Face Detection, teams received a partial picture of a child's face, whom they had to find in one of the classrooms and then bring to the headmaster's office to receive their next clue. In Face Detention, teams had to copy a sentence in Chinese 50 times onto a blackboard without making any errors to receive their next clue.

Additional task

- After completing the Detour, teams had to ride a raft down a river to reach the Pit Stop.

=== Leg 10 (Sichuan → Yunnan) ===
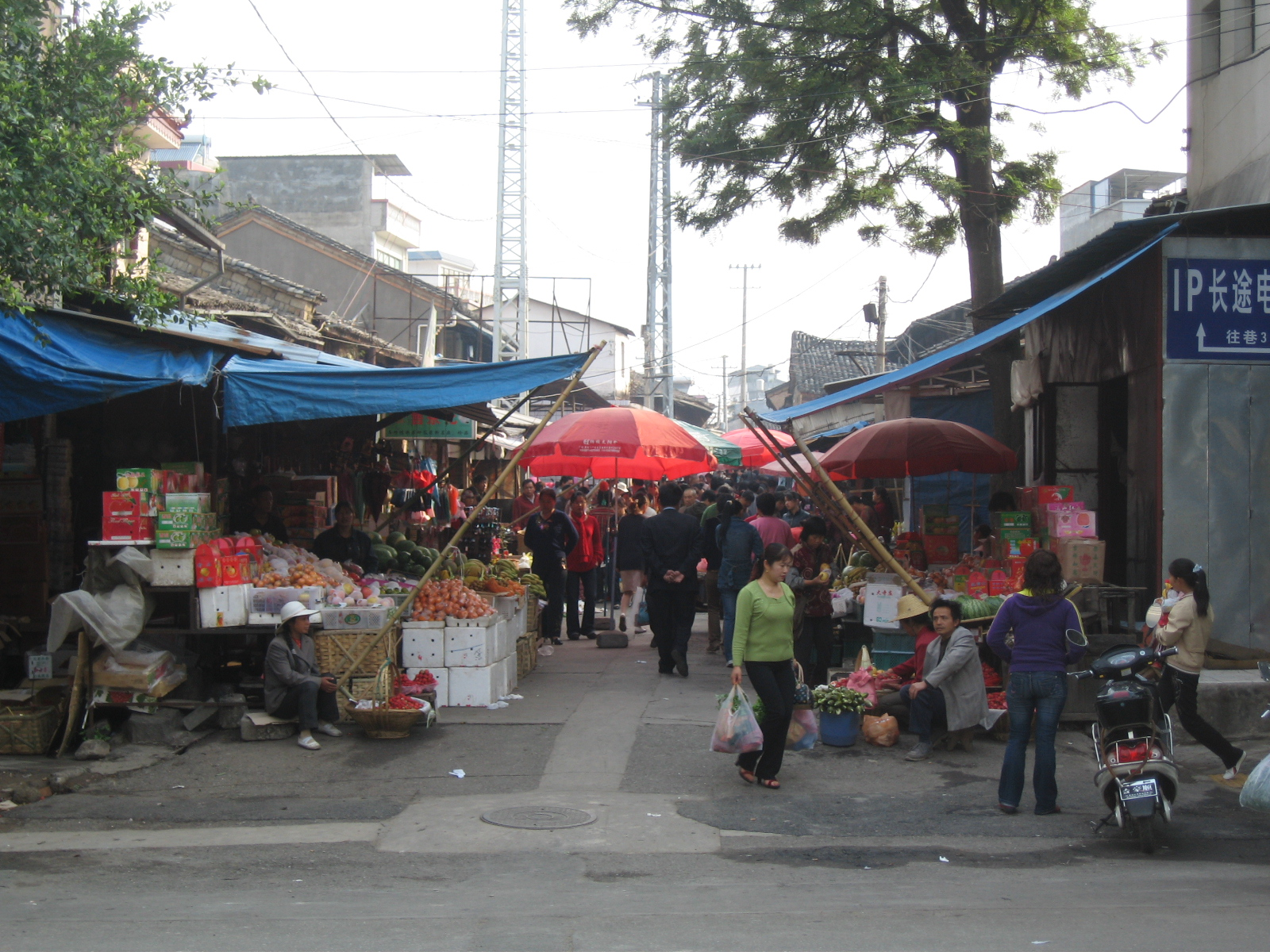
Tengchong, Yunnan was visited during this leg.

Airdate: October 17, 2010

- Chengdu (Chengdu Shuangliu International Airport) to Kunming, Yunnan (Kunming Wujiaba International Airport)
- Kunming to Tengchong, Baoshan
- Tengchong (Anti-Aggression War Memorial)
- Tengchong (Beihai Wetlands)
- Tengchong (Yunfeng Shan – Temple)
- Tengchong (Tengchong Volcano Park)
- Tengchong (Heshun Ancient Village)
- Tengchong (Wenxing Lou)

In this leg's Roadblock, one team member had to play golf. They would pick up a club and some tennis balls and hit them towards the hole. If all of the tennis balls landed in the water, they had to retrieve them and try again, but if they could get at least one to land on the island with the hole, they would receive their next clue.

For their Speed Bump, Charlie & Rachel had to help a local farmer and use two water buffalo to plow a field and complete three laps, before they could proceed on to the Detour.

This leg's Detour was a choice between Fish or Float. In Fish, teams had to catch two fish in a rice paddy with their bare hands. In Float, teams would given some bamboo and rope and had to build a raft. They then had to paddle it across Wild Duck Lake without sinking to receive their next clue.

Additional task

- At the Yunfeng Shan Temple, teams had to use a donkey to transport 20 kilograms (44 lb) of wood to another temple at the top of the mountain. If the donkeys got tired or refused to cooperate, teams could carry the wood on their backs instead.

=== Leg 11 (Yunnan → Guangdong) ===
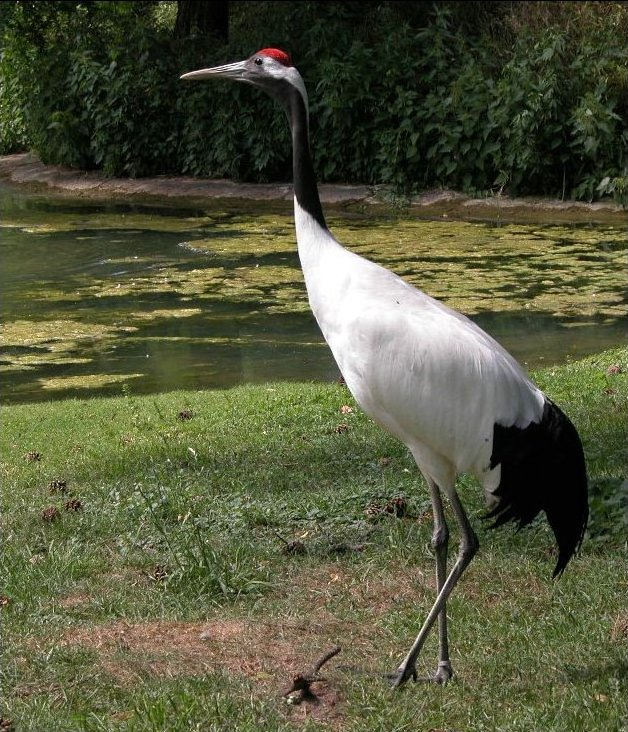
One side of the Detour had teams herd red-crowned cranes.

Airdate: October 24, 2010

- Tengchong (Tengchong Airport) to Guangzhou, Guangdong (Guangzhou Baiyun International Airport)
- Guangzhou (Guangzhou Baiyun International Airport) to Zhaoqing
- Zhaoqing (Longchuan Seafood Restaurant)
- Zhaoqing (Old City Wall) (Overnight Rest)
- Zhaoqing (Bagua Village)
- Zhaoqing (Dinghu Mountain)
- Zhaoqing (Flying Water Pool)
- Zhaoqing (Seven Star Crags)
- Zhaoqing (Lou Yuejiang)

In this leg's Roadblock, one team member had to rappel down a large waterfall and swim through a small platform to retrieve the next clue. They then have to swim back to complete the task.

This season's final Detour was a choice between Crags or Cranes. In Crags, teams made their way to an ancient cave. They would find tablets with numbers and Chinese characters. The Chinese characters would translate to an island in the park that contained 500 statues. Teams would have to use the numbers to find the correct statue to find their next clue. In Cranes, teams had to find another island in the park dedicated to the protection of the red-crowned crane. They would then have to herd seven cranes into a pen for the next clue.

Additional tasks

- At Longchuan Seafood Restaurant, teams had to eat ten cockroaches to receive their next clue.
- At Bagua Village, teams had to find the well and fill buckets with water. They then had to transfer this water to the village's direct center where they would find a large container to fill. Once the container was filled, teams would receive their next clue.

=== Leg 12 (Guangdong → Shanghai) ===
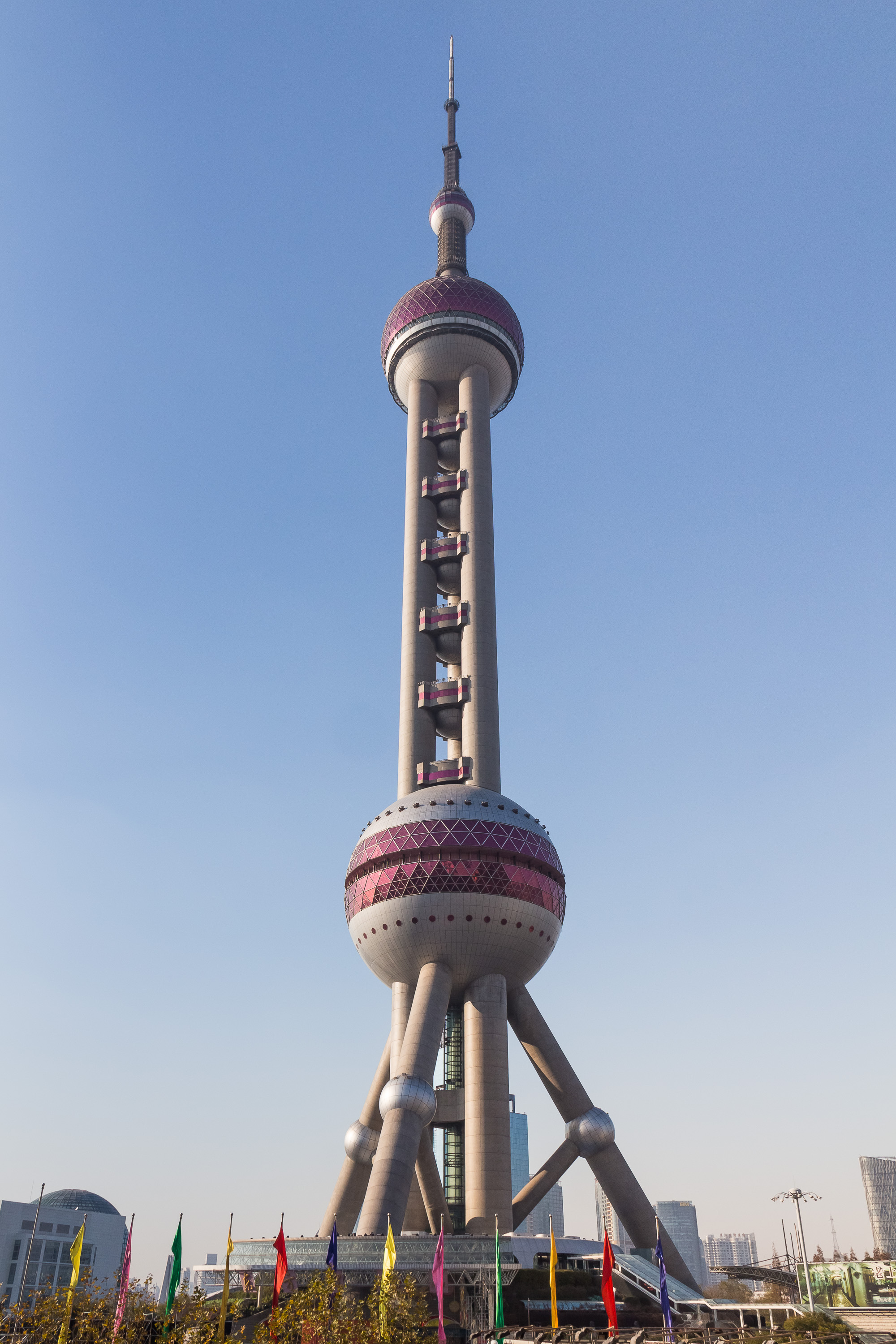
The Oriental Pearl Tower in Shanghai was the Finish line of the first season of The Amazing Race: China Rush.

Airdate: October 30, 2010

- Zhaoqing (Baiyun Bus Station) to Guangzhou (Guangzhou Baiyun International Airport)
- Guangzhou (Guangzhou Baiyun International Airport) to Shanghai (Shanghai Pudong International Airport)
- Shanghai (International Automobile City)
- Shanghai (International Automobile City – Shanghai Auto Museum)
- Shanghai (International Automobile City – Test Track)
- Shanghai (Shanghai Automobile City Station to Madang Road Station)
- Shanghai (Shanghai Expo Park – South Africa Pavilion)
- Shanghai (Shanghai Expo Park – China Railway Pavilion)
- Shanghai (The Bund)
- Shanghai (Oriental Pearl Tower)

In this season's final Roadblock, one team member had to climb to the top of a giant metal wheel to retrieve their next clue and then rappel back down to the ground.

Additional tasks

- At the Automobile Museum, teams had to find either one of three cars, a 1958 Fiat 500, a 1964 Jaguar XKE, or a 1966 Shanghai SH761, with keys in the ignition amongst many vintage cars and successfully start it. Then, they had to return the keys to the representative to get their next clue.
- At the test track, teams had to drive one lap around the track while obeying three different speed limits, within 3 km/h, to receive their next clue; however, only the team member not driving would be able to see the speedometer.
- At the South Africa Pavilion, teams had to match five glasses of wine to their corresponding bottles to receive their next clue from the sommelier.
- At the China Railway Pavilion, teams would find a map of China and had to correctly identify the ten Pit Stop cities from the season in chronological order by pinning numbered labels to receive their next clue.

Leg	City
1	Ningbo, Zhejiang
2	Wuxi, Jiangsu
3	Changzhou, Jiangsu
4	Yangzhou, Jiangsu
5	Beijing, Beijing
6	Tai'an, Shandong
7	Qingdao, Shandong
8 & 9	Chengdu, Sichuan
10	Tengchong, Baoshan, Yunnan
11	Zhaoqing, Guangdong

- The final clue found at The Bund was written entirely in Mandarin Chinese.
