= SOs (gamer) =

South Korean pro gamer

sOs
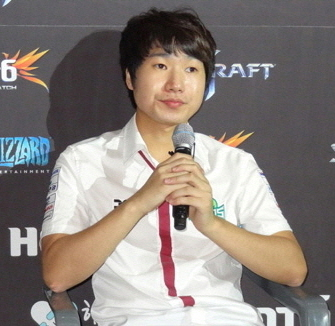
- Kim Yoo-Jin

Personal information
- Name: Kim Yoo Jin
- Nationality: South Korean

Current team
- Team: Woongjin Stars (2011–2013); Jin Air Green Wings (2013–2020); Team NV (2020–2021)
- Game: StarCraft II

Career highlights and awards
- 2× WCS champion (2013, 2015); 2× IEM champion (2014 Poland, 2016 Taipei)
Medal record
Esports
Representing South Korea
Asian Indoor and Martial Arts Games
Gold medal – first place	2013 South Korea	StarCraft II: Heart of the Swarm

Kim Yoo-jin (Korean: 김유진), better known by his gaming handle sOs, is a Korean professional StarCraft II player. He is the first two-time StarCraft II World Championship Series winner, claiming the title in 2013 and 2015. Kim spent most of his career playing for the Jin Air Green Wings team, from 2013–2020. He is a Protoss player. He announced his retirement from professional gaming in 2021.

== Career ==
In 2013, sOs beat Lee Jaedong at the World Championship Series (WCS).

In 2015, he repeated his WCS title after beating Life in the finals.

In 2018 he made another deep run in the WCS. soS defeated his Jin Air teammate Cho "Maru" Seong Ju 3:0 in the quarterfinal; Maru was one of the favorites after Maru had won three GSLs in a row. sOs lost 0:3 to Kim "Stats" Dae-yeob in the semifinal.

sOs left Jin Air Green Wings for a new Korean team, Team NV, in November 2020. In September 2021, sOs announced his retirement from StarCraft on Team NV's Instagram.

== Tournament results ==
- 3-4th - 2013 WCS Season 1 Korea GSL
- 2nd - 2013 WCS Season 1
- 1st - 2013 WCS Global Finals
- 2nd - Red Bull Battle Grounds New York City
- 1st - IEM Season VIII - World Championship
- 1st - 2014 Hot6ix Cup
- 3-4th - 2015 Global StarCraft II League Season 2
- 1st - 2015 MSI Masters Gaming Arena
- 3-4th - 2015 DreamHack Open: Stockholm
- 1st - 2015 WCS Global Finals
- 2nd - 2016 Global StarCraft II League Season 2
- 2nd - 2017 Global StarCraft II League Season 3
- 2nd - 2018 IEM Season XII - PyeongChang
- 2nd - 2018 AfreecaTV GSL Super Tournament 2
- 3-4th - 2018 WCS Global Finals

== Playstyle ==
sOs is known for his creative play, often going for unusual build orders and "cheeses": high risk, high reward unconventional openings such as cannon rushing. For example, at the finals of IEM Katowice 2014, sOs opened with the extremely high-risk proxy gateways (placing production buildings in the opponent's own base) strategy twice in a row in a best of seven against herO (Kim Joon-Ho) and won both games with it, and won the entire series 4–1.

Preceded by Won "PartinG" Lee-sak	StarCraft II World Championship Series winner 2013	Succeeded by Lee "Life" Seung-hyun

Preceded by Lee "Life" Seung-hyun	StarCraft II World Championship Series winner 2015	Succeeded by Byun "ByuN" Hyun Woo
