= 2012 StarCraft II World Championship Series =

Esports tournament

2012 StarCraft II World Championship Series Global Finals
- 2012

Tournament information
- Sport: StarCraft II
- Location: Shanghai
- Administrator: Blizzard Entertainment
- Venue: Shanghai Expo
- Purse: $250,000

Final positions
- Champion: PartinG

The 2012 StarCraft II World Championship Series (WCS) is part of the Battle.net World Championship Series, a series of video game tournaments held by Blizzard Entertainment, the creators of the video game StarCraft II (SC2). Tournaments were held in more than 28 countries to find top StarCraft II competitors. The top-ranked players from each continent were then invited to compete in the Global Finals in Shanghai, China. Korean player Won "PartinG" Lee-Sak emerged victorious in the final match against Jang "Creator" Hyun Woo, with third place going to Jung "Rain" Yoon Jong.

== Background ==
Blizzard Entertainment partnered with Turtle Entertainment, the company behind the Electronic Sports League (ESL). The Electronic Sports League helped run national level tournaments for the series in eleven countries: Naples, Italy; Wrocław, Poland; Rotterdam, Netherlands; Madrid, Spain; Cologne, Germany; London, England; Singapore; Paris, France; Kyiv, Ukraine; Rio de Janeiro, Brazil. In addition, ESL hosted an event for citizens of other European countries which did not have a national level tournament. ESL also helped operate the South American Continental Finals which took place in São Paulo, Brazil. Blizzard also partnered with DreamHack for the European Continental Finals and the Nordic Nationals, with MLG for the North American Continental Finals and respective nationals, GOM TV for the South Korean Nationals, NetEase for the Chinese Nationals, the Asian Continental Finals and the Global Finals, the Taiwan eSports League for the Taiwanese nationals, eSports Tournaments NZ for the New Zealand Nationals and the Australian Cyber League for the Australian Nationals and Oceania Finals.

== Seeding ==
The WCS began in April 2012, starting at the local level, with qualifiers held in 28 countries. Players that win a seed at the local level advance to the national level championships. From there, the top seeds are invited to one of several continental championship events, with the winners of those events advancing to the final stage of the series: the WCS Global Finals. The season included more than 30 electronic sports events.

== National finals ==
The United Kingdom national finals were held in London at the British Academy of Film and Television Arts on June 30 and July 1, 2012. The top three players from the event were invited to the next stage in the series: the European continental finals. 1000 spectators were estimated to attend the event in person, with others watching it online through live broadcasts hosted by Paul "ReDeYe" Chaloner and casting by Nick "Tasteless" Plott and GomTV's Dan "Artosis" Stemkoski.

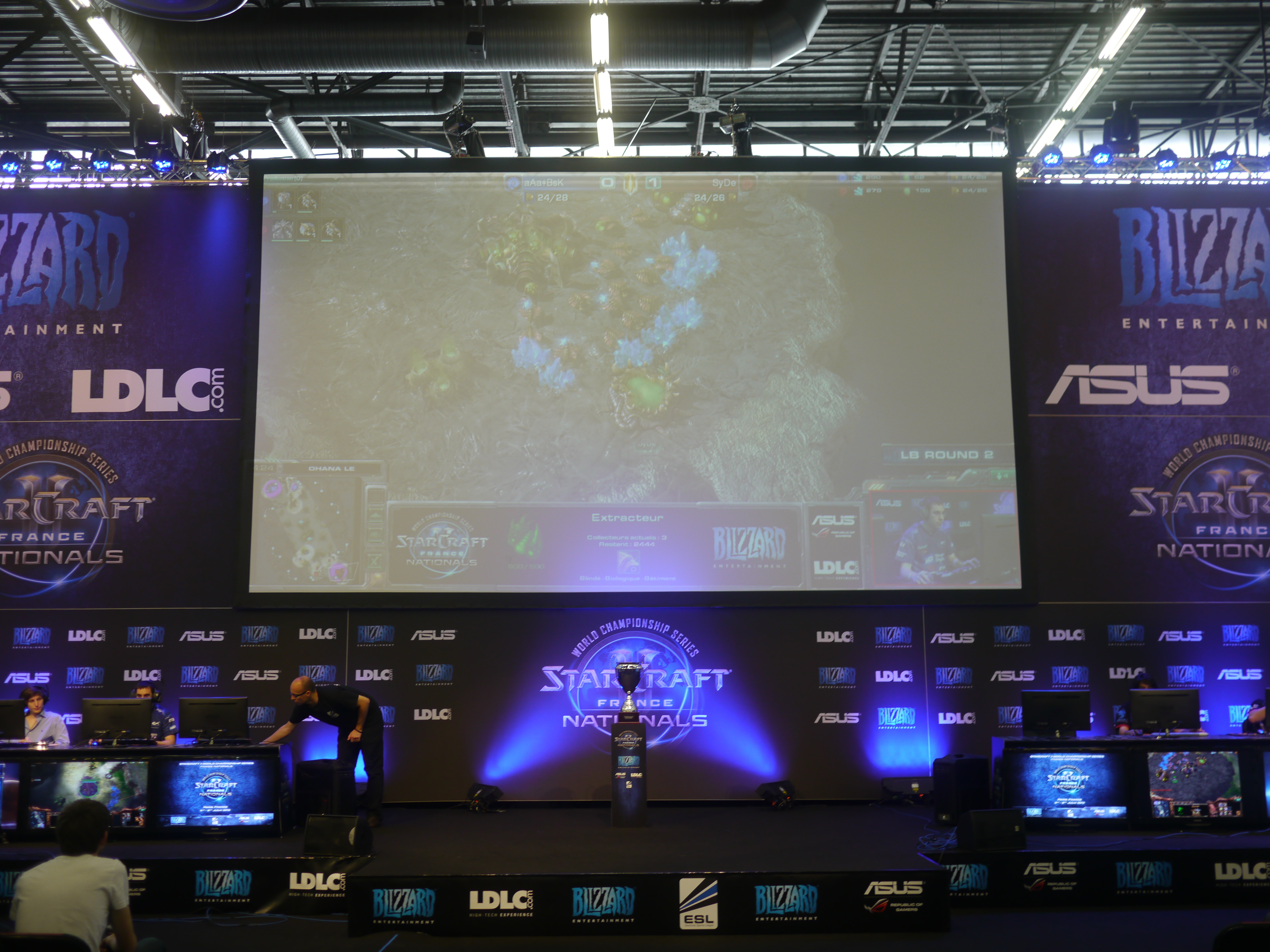
The 2012 France national finals were held At The 13th Impact Japan Expo in Paris-Nord Villepinte

The France national finals (sponsored by AsusTek Republic of Gamers brand) were held in Paris at The 13th Impact Japan Expo in Paris-Nord Villepinte from July 5 to 8, 2012. with a prize pool of $15,000 Also The top three players from the event qualified for the European continental finals.

The United States national finals were held in Anaheim, California at The Anaheim Convention Center from June 8 to 10, 2012. with a prize pool of $30,000 Also The top sixteen players from the event qualified for the North America continental finals.

== Continental finals ==
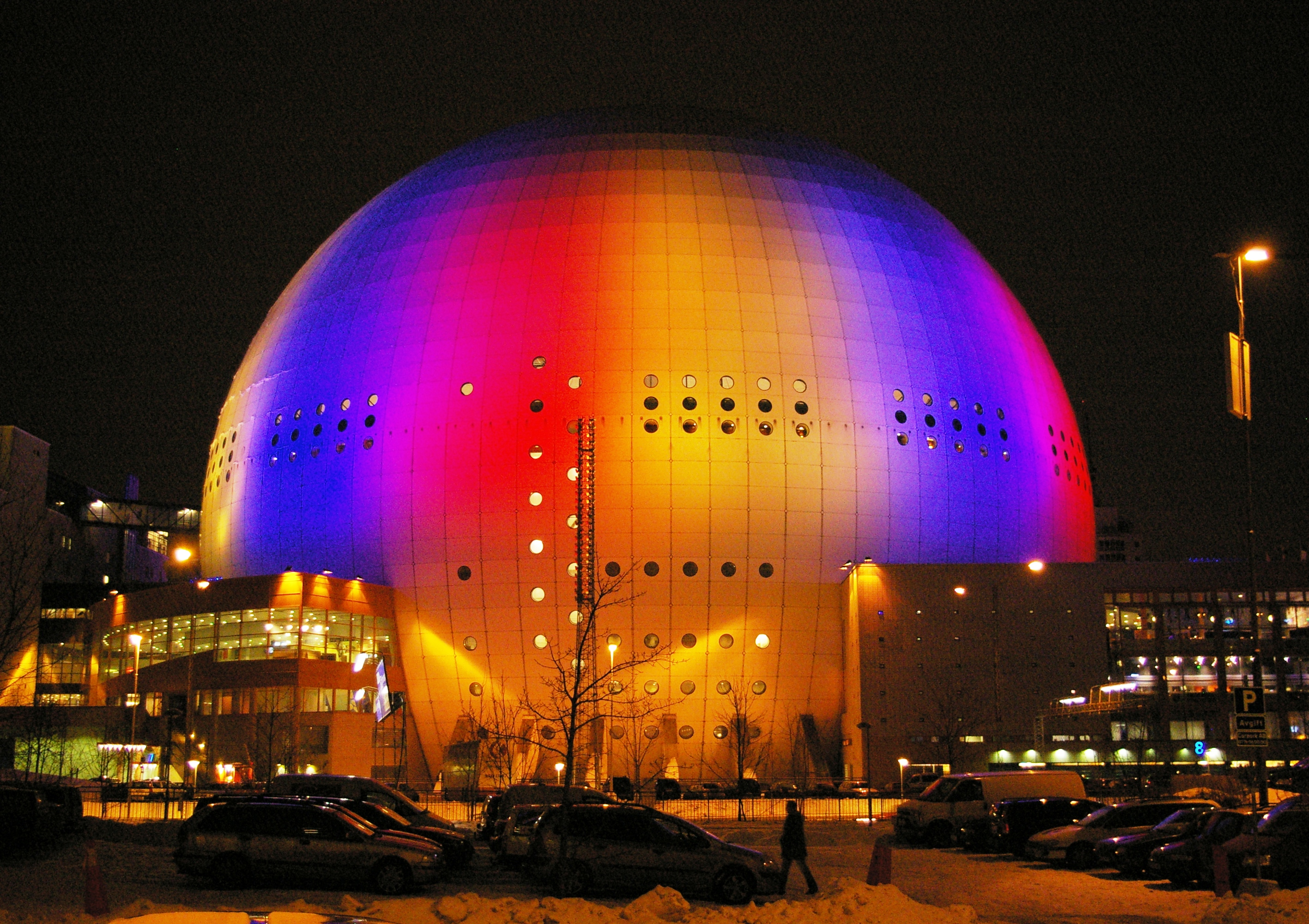
The 2012 European finals were held in the Ericsson Globe in Sweden.

The 2012 WCS European finals took place in the Ericsson Globe in Sweden on September 15–16 with a prize pool of $60,000 Also The top six players from the event qualified for the World Championship finals.

The 2012 WCS North America finals took place in Anaheim at The 2012 MLG Pro Circuit/Spring in Anaheim Convention Center from August 24 to 26, 2012 with a prize pool of $60,000 Also The top seven players from the event qualified for the World Championship finals.

== Global Finals ==
The WCS Global Finals were held at the Shanghai Expo Mart in Shanghai, China as part of the Battle.net World Championship event. The event included both the StarCraft II WCS Global Finals as well as the World of Warcraft Arena Global Finals. The event sold out, and the coordinators expected over 10,000 attendees.

Korean player Won "PartinG" Lee-Sak took first place in the StarCraft II WCS, with Creator and Rain following for second and third, respectively.

First round
(South Korea) PartinG	3
(Canada) Scarlett	0
(United States) Suppy	3
(Belarus) LoWeLy	1
(Taiwan) Sen	3
(South Korea) Curious	0
(Denmark) BabyKnight	1
(South Korea) HerO	3
(United States) IdrA	1
(South Korea) Rain	3
(Russia) TitaN	0
(Chile) KiLLeR	3
(Spain) LucifroN	2
(Spain) VortiX	3
(South Korea) Creator	3
(United States) Illusion	0

Second round
(South Korea) PartinG	3
(United States) Suppy	2
(Taiwan) Sen	3
(South Korea) HerO	2
(South Korea) Rain	3
(Chile) KiLLeR	0
(Spain) VortiX	2
(South Korea) Creator	3

Semifinals
(South Korea) PartinG	3
(Taiwan) Sen	0
(South Korea) Rain	2
(South Korea) Creator	3

Finals
(South Korea) PartinG	4
(South Korea) Creator	2
Third place
(Taiwan) Sen	0
(South Korea) Rain	3
