= PartinG (gamer) =

South Korean esports player

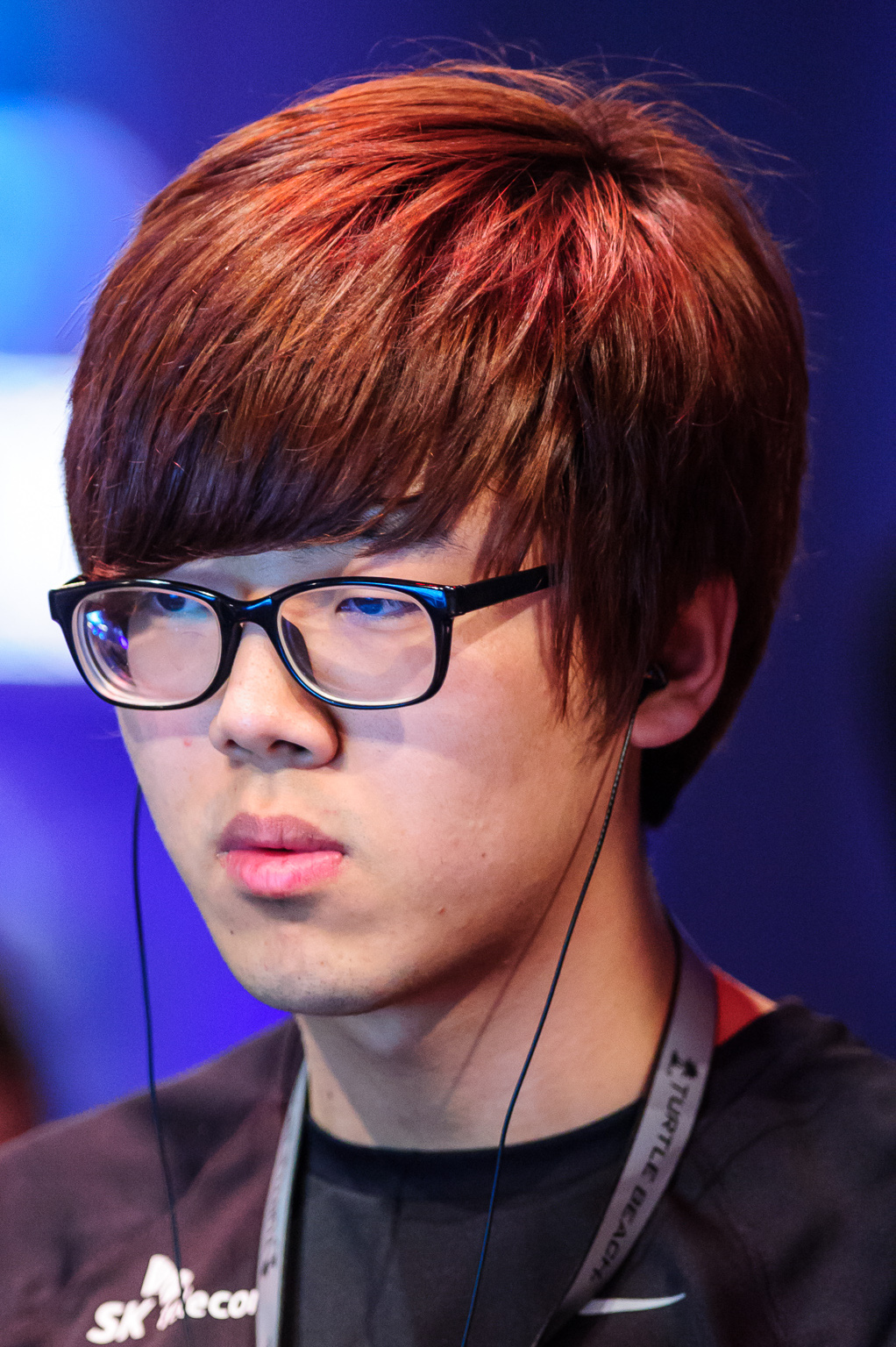
- Won Lee-sak in 2013

Personal information
- Name: Won Lee Sak
- Born: August 24, 1994 (age 32)
- Nationality: South Korean

Career information
- Game: StarCraft II
- Playing career: 2011–present

Team history
- StarTale
- SK Telecom T1
- yoe Flash Wolves/Flash Wolves
- PSISTORM Gaming
- Player 1/Pixel 1
- Dragon Phoenix Gaming

Career highlights and awards
- WCS champion (2012); WCG champion (2012)

Won Lee-sak, (Korean: 원이삭) better known by his in-game name PartinG, is a South Korean StarCraft II player. He was the winner of the 2012 StarCraft II World Championship Series. He has played for yoe Flash Wolves, SK Telecom T1, and Team Player 1.

== Career ==
=== Wings Of Liberty ===
PartinG participated in the ESV TV Korean Weekly and Korean StarLeague Daily.

==== Code A ====
Parting would make his Global StarCraft II League (GSL) debut in Code A for the GSL November, beating BBoongBBoong in his group finals. He then defeated the GSL August 2011 runner-up TOP 2–1 in the round of 48, and proceeded to 2-0 Code S dropout Clide in the Round of 32. He faced Killer in the round of 24 and defeated him 2–1 to clinch a Code S spot in GSL January.

==== Code S ====
PartinG made his debut in Code S in the 2012 GSL Season 1. As the only new Code S player to advance through the Round of 32, he defeated Puzzle and NaDa to advance 2–0. In the Round of 16, he took out jjakji in a 2–1 series, lost to MC 2–0, and then beat jjakji once again to move onto the Round of 8 where he eventually lost to DongRaeGu.

In 2012 GSL Season 2, PartinG defeated Polt and ForGG in the Round of 32, then he took down TheStC and MarineKing in the Round of 16, securing himself Code S status for this and next season in the process. In the Round of 8, he defeated Oz 3-0 advancing to the semifinals where he played against 3 time GSL champion Mvp. PartinG lost the first two games, then took game three on Cloud Kingdom before losing on Metropolis for a final score of 3–1.

In 2012 GSL Season 3, PartinG got eliminated by hands of Symbol and MarineKing, being able to defeat only YuGiOh and fell down into Code A being able to win against Killer and aLive and getting back his spot in Code S.

In 2012 GSL Season 4, PartinG was able to take down Leenock in opening match in his Ro32 group but lost to eventual champion Seed and then in rematch to Leenock, falling to Code A again. This time PartinG lost to Vampire and got eliminated from Ro32 Code A as well, getting sent into 2012 GSL Season 5 Up and Down. There he was able to get top-2 in his group and get back into Code S.

In 2012 GSL Season 5, PartinG finally advanced from his group, beating both Polt and finale. However, Ro16 was not kind to him and PartinG got swept from the group by Polt and Sniper with latter winning whole season later. This time PartinG was able to come back into Code S instantly by beating Center in Ro24 of Code A and securing his spot in last Wings of Liberty GSL.

Last Wings of Liberty GSL Code S started nice for PartinG after he won his group by beating against Byun and Losira. In Ro16, PartinG was able to recover after initial loss to Life by winning against BBoongBBoong and getting his revenge on Life. However, in Ro8 PartinG's run through tournament stopped after he was swept by Curious.

==== GSTL ====
On April 8 of 2012, in the Final of 2012 Global StarCraft II Team League Season 1/Playoffs at Las Vegas, PartinG was able to defeat Maru and BBoongBBoong. In his controversial match against MarineKing, even though he was able to take substantial lead at first, the sudden drop of Terran's connection forced a regame, in which MarineKing ended PartinG's winning Streak and eventually won the Championship.

==== Korean StarCraft II League ====
On December 13, 2011, PartinG participated in the KSL Daily Week 3 Day 2. PartinG started off from the quarterfinals. PartinG took down jookTo and AnNyeong in order to advance to the finals. In the finals, PartinG defeated Jjun by a score of 2-0 and grabbed first place.

On December 21, 2011, PartinG participated in the KSL Daily Week 4 Day 3. PartinG started off from the quarterfinals. PartinG took down Terius and jjakji in order to advance to the finals. In the finals, PartinG defeated Vampire by a score of 2-1 and grabbed first place.

==== OnGameNet Star II League ====
On July 2, 2012, PartinG participated in the 2012 OSL Non-KeSPA Preliminaries. PartinG received a BYE in rounds one and two, and then took down jookTo, sC, and faced Puzzle in the finals. After taking down Puzzle by a score of 2:1, PartinG advanced in to the 2012 OSL Non-KeSPA Dual Tournament. There, PartinG took down Seal in game one, and then advanced in to the winners bracket to face MC. After taking down MC, PartinG advanced in to the 2012 SC2 OSL Season 1 with a total score of 2–0. PartinG would end up going 2–1 in his group, beating BaBy and Mvp, but losing to Flying. Regardless, his second-place finish would allow him to move on to the round of 16, where he would play Rain in the first round and lose 3–1.

==== StarCraft II World Championship Series ====
===== 2012 WCS Korea Nationals =====
In the winners bracket of the 2012 WCS Korea Nationals, PartinG defeated sC 2:0, aLive 2:1, Curious 2:0, and Seed 2:0 before losing to Squirtle 0:2 in the winners bracket final. Parting would then lose to Creator 1:2 in the losers bracket final, but earned a seed for the 2012 WCS Asia Finals for his third-place finish.

===== 2012 WCS Asia Finals =====
In the winners bracket of the 2012 WCS Asia Finals, PartinG defeated MacSed 2:0, Curious 2:1, and RorO 2:0 before losing to HerO 0:2. In the losers bracket, he would again defeat Curious 2:1 and then defeated CJ Entus's herO 2:1 to reach the loser bracket final. There he would avenge his earlier defeat to HerO by a score of 2:0. In the grand final, PartinG fell to Rain 0:2, but earned a seed for the 2012 Battle.net World Championship for his second-place finish.

==== 2012 Battle.net World Championship ====
In the group stage of the 2012 Battle.net World Championship, PartinG defeated both Socke and Illusion by a score of 2:0 to take 1st place in the group. In the round of 16, PartinG defeated Scarlett 3:0. In a hard-fought quarterfinals he defeated Supply by a score of 3:2 after being down 0:2 after the first two games. In the semifinals, PartinG defeated Sen 3:0 to reach the World Championship finals vs Creator. While the two Protoss players split the first four games of the best of seven, PartinG won the next two to win the series 4:2, thereby winning the 2012 Battle.net World Championship.

==== IEM - Intel Extreme Masters ====
PartinG participated in IEM Season VII - Katowice on 18–20 January 2013, it was the first time PartinG ever competed in an IEM event. PartinG went 4–1 in groups, which advanced him into the Quarterfinals where he 3-0'ed Incredible Miracle's YoDa. He then went on to play the young Terran player Dream who very surprisingly upset PartinG with a 3–1 score, which means PartinG finished in 3rd-4th place.

==== WCG 2012 ====
PartinG participated in WCG 2012. In the qualifiers, he was able to win against HyuN and Heart, before conceding a series to MarineKing. Despite that, he won against KeeN in the 3rd place match and advanced to the main event. He got placed second in his group, surprisingly dropping a set to Fenix, but in bracket stage he was able to scrap the win against CombatEX, overcome a deficit against MacSed and finally, dispatch Adelscott in the finals, securing his gold medal.

On January 3, 2013, PartinG left StarTale, and joined SK Telecom T1 on January 14.

=== Heart of the Swarm ===
==== 2013 MLG Winter Championship ====
PartinG's run in HotS started at 2013 MLG Winter Championship. After defeating teammate FanTaSy in Showdowns he got seeded into bracket. He was able to defeat State and Sen before losing to eventual finalist Flash, securing a 5th-8th place before going back to Korea to play in GSL.

==== 2013 WCS Korea GSL/OSL ====
In WCS Korea Season 1 GSL, PartinG topped his group after beating Last and Leenock. In the group selections for the Ro16, he chose the arguably strongest group ever in the history of SC2 including himself, INnoVation – who was compared to an invincible robot at the time, Life – who had just won 2013 MLG Winter Championship, and Flash – who just beat PartinG at MLG. After losing his initial match to Life, PartinG was able to recover and win against both Flash and Life to advance into the playoffs. In the playoffs, PartinG met Soulkey and lost the first 2 maps convincingly. After winning two scrappy games, PartinG lost in the decider and got eliminated into Placement matches, where he lost to RorO 1-3 and was not able to qualify to WCS Season 1 Finals.

==== Red Bull Battle Grounds New York City ====
In order to advance to Battlegrounds, PartinG played in the TLMC qualifier with enjoyable and sometimes, even weird, maps. He beat Artist, Bunny, jjakji, aLive, herO, and finally San, and secured his spot at Red Bull Battle Grounds New York City.

At Red Bull Battle Grounds New York City, PartinG said that if he defeated sOs, who had just won the WCS Global Finals (where PartinG had not made the field as a top 16 WCS point earner), that he, not the BlizzCon champion, was the best player in the world. He backed up his talk by going undefeated and conceding only three maps as he bested (in order) Scarlett, former teammate Bomber, MC and finally sOs himself in the finals 4–1 to win his first Premier Tournament since his WCG win 11 months beforehand.

==== WCG 2013 ====
In the WCG Korean qualifiers, PartinG swept the bracket after winning against JangBi, Rain, INnoVation, and finally Sora, who was the main sensation of those preliminaries, and got seeded into main event a second time in a row. After winning Battlegrounds, PartinG said that he was not worried against anyone but Soulkey at World Cyber Games 2013, and all his thoughts were about playing him in the finals. He was able to sweep his group with a 12-1 mapscore, sweep Ian in the quarterfinals, but then lost to Sora. He had to play Jim in the Bronze final, and after winning, he got third place, securing an all-Korean podium.

==== 2014 WCS GSL ====
In Code S Season 1, PartinG topped MyuNgSiK and TRUE in the Ro32, before getting placed into a PvP slaughterhouse with T1 teammates Rain and Classic, and his former teammate Squirtle. After losing the initial match to Rain, PartinG was able to overcome Squirtle and Classic, due to his famous impeccable micro and decision making, and advanced to Ro8 where he met soO again. Despite winning a game on Yeonsu with the infamous Soul Train, PartinG surrendered 1-3 and got eliminated again, but secured a 10th consecutive Code S appearance.

Before his Ro32 group in Code S Season 2 started, PartinG got the NesTea Award, being the only holder who had not won a GSL. He swept his group with ease, dispatching ByuL and SuperNova with aggressive play. However, PartinG got placed into another group of death in the Ro16 with his SK Telecom teammates soO and Classic, and herO. After losing the initial match to Classic, he was able to dismantle herO, but then proceeded to concede another series to his kryptonite, soO, getting eliminated into Code A for the first time since the last OSL.

On September 11, 2014, he announced that he declined to re-sign a new contract with the team SK Telecom T1. He officially left on September 30. He joined yoe Flash Wolves on October 16, 2014 and this also meant he would play with his old team StarTale in the 2015 season of Proleague.

PartinG announced that he would not be re-signing with Flash Wolves after his contract expired on January 6, 2016.

Preceded by Jung "Mvp" Jong Hyun (BlizzCon 2011)	StarCraft II World Championship Series winner 2012	Succeeded by Kim "sOs" Yoo Jin
