= 2014 StarCraft II World Championship Series =

Esports tournament

2014 StarCraft II World Championship Series Global Finals
- 2014

Tournament information
- Sport: StarCraft II
- Location: Anaheim, California
- Administrator: Blizzard Entertainment
- Venue(s): Anaheim Convention Center
- Purse: $250,000

Final positions
- Champion: Lee "Life" Seung Hyun
- Runner-up: Mun "MMA" Seong Won

The 2014 StarCraft II World Championship Series (WCS) is the 2014 edition of the StarCraft II World Championship Series, the highest level of esports competition for StarCraft II. The tournament series' Global Finals were won by South Korean professional player Lee "Life" Seung Hyun.

== Format ==
The 2014 StarCraft II World Championship Series introduced some residency requirements for participation in the three different WCS Premier leagues, in reaction to Korean dominance across all WCS leagues. Korea's WCS Premier League returned to Global StarCraft II League (GSL) branding, with all three seasons fully run by GOMTV, marking the end of the Ongamenet Starleague (OSL). All WCS leagues featured three seasons of regular play, while the cross-regional Season Finals from 2013 did not return.

To support larger third party tournaments, tiers of non-WCS events that give out WCS points were created, for a total of three non-WCS tiers based on prize pool, qualification and invitation process, number of participants, language coverage, and other factors.

=== Seeding ===
All WCS-sanctioned events gave out points to players based on their ranking and the event's tier. The sixteen highest-ranking players received invites to the Global Finals, seeded into a bracket based on their rank.

== Results ==
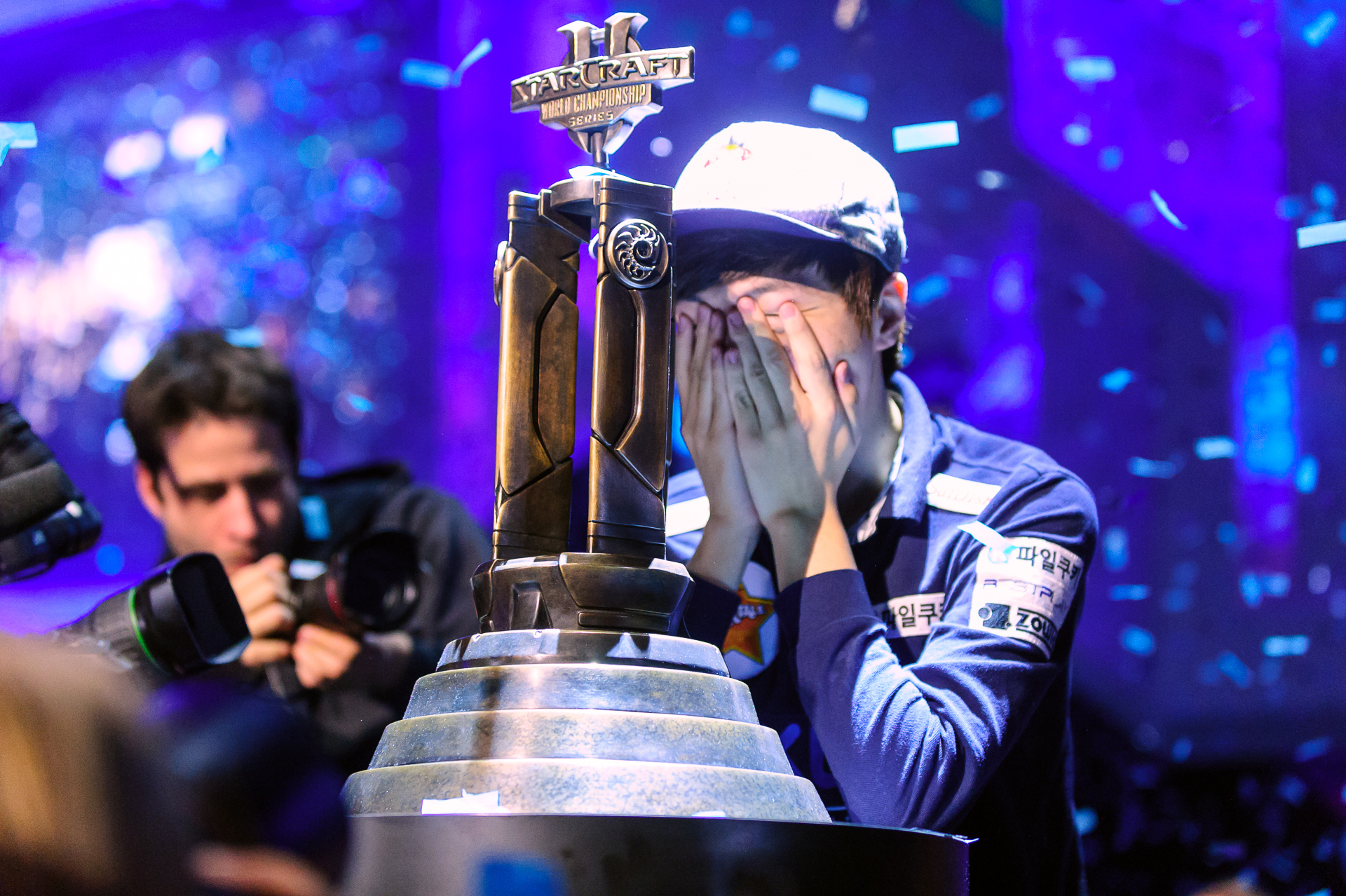
Lee "Life" Seung Hyun won 2014 StarCraft II World Championship Series

=== Global Finals ===
The WCS Global Finals were held at the Anaheim Convention Center in Anaheim, California as part of BlizzCon 2014. They featured bracket play in the round of sixteen, played out for the first time the week prior to the main event as part of BlizzCon Opening Week, with the quarterfinals onward at the convention center itself.

Quarterfinals		Semifinals		Finals
(South Korea) Bomber	1
(South Korea) MMA	3	(South Korea) MMA	3
(South Korea) herO	2	(South Korea) Classic	1
(South Korea) Classic	3			(South Korea) MMA	1
(South Korea) San	0			(South Korea) Life	4
(South Korea) Life	3	(South Korea) Life	3
(South Korea) Taeja	3	(South Korea) Taeja	2
(South Korea) INnoVation	1
