= Shanghai Expo Mart =

Chinese exhibition hall from Expo 2010

- 上海世博会展中心
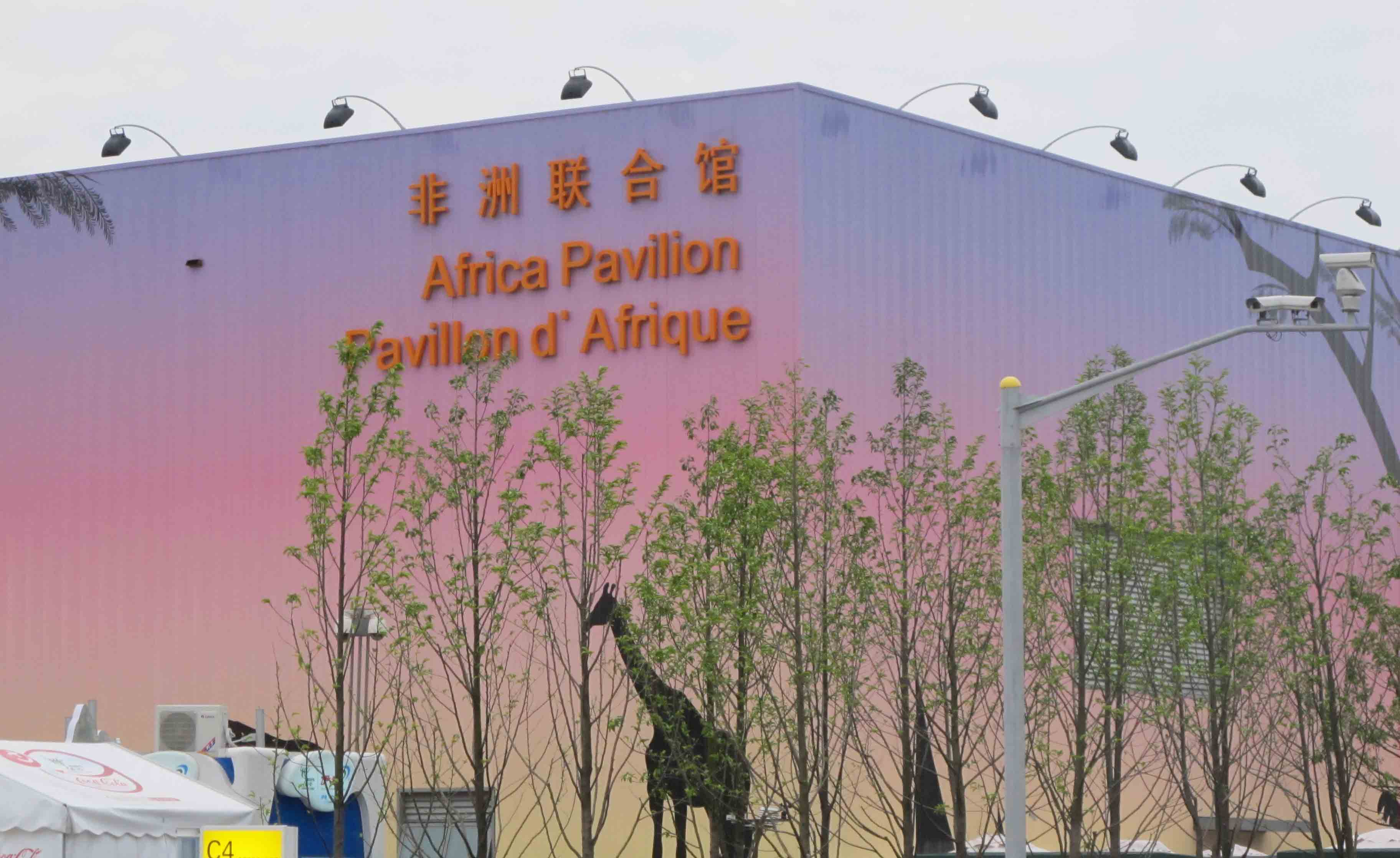

- Location within China
- Former names: Africa Joint Pavilion (Chinese: 非洲聯合館)

General information
- Status: Completed
- Location: Pudong, Shanghai, China, No. 2211, Shibo Avenue, China
- Coordinates: 31.1845°N 121.4692°E
- Completed: September 2009

Technical details
- Floor area: 21,000 square metres (230,000 sq ft)

The Shanghai Expo Mart (Chinese: 上海世博会展中心; pinyin: Shànghǎi shìbóhuì zhǎn zhōngxīn; Shanghainese: Zånhe sypohwe zaen tsonshin), formerly the Africa Joint Pavilion (Chinese: 非洲聯合館), is an exhibition hall near the Huangpu River in Shanghai, China. The hall was originally constructed for Expo 2010 and consists of 21,000 square metres (230,000 sq ft) of indoor area and 3,600 square metres (39,000 sq ft) of outdoor space. The hall underwent renovation after the expo, with renovations finishing in November 2011.

== Africa Joint Pavilion ==
The Shanghai Expo Mart was originally constructed for Expo 2010 as the Africa Joint Pavilion. It was built as a collaboration with Chinese and African people, and was completed in September 2009. The pavilion had a large, abstract mural of trees painted on the side of the building. The mural was nearing completion on June 11, 2009, and was shown on the building during the expo. The site was used to showcase the development and culture of cities in Africa. The expo lasted from May 1 until October 31, 2010. On May 19, the exhibit set a record after receiving one million visitors during the course of the exhibition, on June 22 broke five million visitors, and passed 10 million in July. It was both the largest pavilion and represented the highest number of countries of any pavilion at a World Expo. The pavilion featured exhibits from 42 African countries and 8 countries represented through their membership of the African Union.

After the end of Expo 2010, the expo management's plan was to demolish all of the national pavilions from the event except for China's. Some of the buildings had cost $16 million to construct, and after the event, six of them were donated to the city of Shanghai from other countries: the Saudi Arabia Pavilion, the Italy Pavilion, the Luxemburg Pavilion, the Spain Pavilion, the Russia Pavilion and the France Pavilion. Some of the pavilions were temporarily re-purposed: the Italy Pavilion became the Shanghai Italian Center, the Expo Performance Center became the Mercedes-Benz Arena, the China Pavilion became the China Art Palace, and the Africa Joint Pavilion became the Shanghai Expo Mart. The arena is host to sports, concerts, and other events; the China Art Palace hosts pieces of artwork. The Pudong Expo Site Management Office still plans to demolish most of the pavilions if regional development plans have need for the area; however, the Africa Joint Pavilion would be kept permanently. After the expo, the Africa Joint Pavilion was renovated, with the renovations finishing in November 2011. The pavilion was also renamed to the Shanghai Expo Mart.
