= Intel Extreme Masters Season XII – World Championship =

Intel Extreme Masters Season XII – World Championship Katowice
Tournament information
- Sport: Counter-Strike: Global Offensive
- Location: Katowice, Silesian Voivodeship, Poland
- Administrator: Electronic Sports League
- Venue(s): Spodek

Final positions
- Champions: Fnatic
- Runner-up: FaZe Clan

Intel Extreme Masters Season XII – World Championship Katowice
Tournament information
- Sport: StarCraft II
- Location: Katowice, Silesian Voivodeship, Poland
- Administrator: Electronic Sports League
- Venue(s): Spodek

Final positions
- Champions: Rogue
- Runner-up: Classic

The Intel Extreme Masters Season 12 – World Championship or IEM Katowice 2018 was the world championship for the twelfth season of the Intel Extreme Masters. It was held at the Spodek in Katowice, Silesian Voivodeship, Poland from February 27–March 4, 2018. The event featured tournaments for Counter-Strike: Global Offensive and StarCraft II.

== Counter-Strike: Global Offensive ==
=== Participating teams ===
==== Direct Invitees ====
- Astralis
- Cloud9
- FaZe Clan
- G2 Esports
- Ninjas in Pyjamas
- SK Gaming
- Virtus.pro

==== Qualifiers ====
- AVANGAR (Farmskins Championship)
- Heroic (Europe)
- Fnatic (Europe)
- North (Europe)
- Gambit (Europe)
- Team Liquid (North America)
- Renegades (North America)
- TyLoo (Asia)
- ORDER (Oceania)

=== Format ===
The group stage used a double elimination format, with the top 3 teams from each group of 8 moving on to the playoffs in the Spodek. The top team in each group earned a bye to the semifinals. All matches were played as best-of-threes except for the first round, which were played as best-of-ones, and the grand finals, which were played as a best-of-five.

=== Group stage ===
==== Group A ====
Quarterfinals
SK Gaming	16
AVANGAR	10
Renegades	13
Astralis	16
Team Liquid	16
Gambit	10
TyLoo	14
Cloud9	16
Lowers Quarterfinals
AVANGAR	0
Renegades	2
Gambit	2
TyLoo	1

Upper Semifinals
SK Gaming	0
Astralis	2
Team Liquid	2
Cloud9	0
Lowers Semifinals
Cloud9	2
Renegades	1
SK Gaming	2
Gambit	1

Upper Finals
Astralis	2
Team Liquid	1
Lowers Finals
Cloud9	2
SK Gaming	1

==== Group B ====
Quarterfinals
FaZe Clan	16
ORDER	3
Ninjas in Pyjamas	10
North	16
G2 Esports	16
Virtus.pro	12
Heroic	9
fnatic	16
Lowers Quarterfinals
ORDER	0
Ninjas in Pyjamas	2
Virtus.pro	0
Heroic	2

Upper Semifinals
FaZe Clan	2
North	0
G2 Esports	1
fnatic	2
Lowers Semifinals
G2 Esports	1
Ninjas in Pyjamas	2
North	2
Heroic	0

Upper Finals
FaZe Clan	0
fnatic	2
Lowers Finals
Ninjas in Pyjamas	2
North	1

=== Playoffs ===
Quarterfinals
A3	Cloud9	1
B2	FaZe Clan	2
B3	Ninjas in Pyjamas	1
A2	Team Liquid	2

Semifinals
A1	Astralis	0
B2	FaZe Clan	2
B1	fnatic	2
A2	Team Liquid	0

Grand Finals
B2	FaZe Clan	2
B1	fnatic	3

== StarCraft II ==
=== Participants ===
Protoss (8)	Terran (8)	Zerg (8)
2017 WCS Global Finals (1)
-	-	Rogue (Green Wings)
Server Qualifiers (11)
Classic	GuMiho (PSISTORM Gaming)	Dark
Dear	INnoVation	Elazer (QLASH)
ShoWTimE (Arma)	uThermal (Liquid)	Impact (TitanEX1)
sOs (Green Wings)	-	Nerchio
Online qualifiers (12)
Hurricane	HeRoMaRinE (mousesports)	Serral (Ence)
Neeb (Ting)	Maru (Green Wings)	Solar (Splyce)
Trap (Green Wings)	Ryung	TRUE (PSISTORM)
Zest	SpeCial (Exeed)	-
-	TY (Splyce)	-

=== Group stage ===
Group A
P	Player	W-L	Map W-L	MD
1	TY	5-0	10-2	+8
2	Dear	4-1	9-2	+7
3	Maru	3-2	7-5	+2
4	GuMiho	2-3	4-7	-3
5	SpeCial	1-4	3-9	-6
6	ShoWTimE	0-5	2-10	-8

Group B
P	Player	W-L	Map W-L	MD
1	Solar	5-0	10-2	+8
2	Dark	3-2	8-4	+3
3	Hurricane	3-2	7-6	+1
4	uThermal	3-2	6-7	-1
5	INnoVation	1-4	5-8	-3
6	TRUE	0-5	1-10	-9

Group C
P	Player	W-L	Map W-L	MD
1	Serral	5-0	10-2	+8
2	Rogue	4-1	9-3	+6
3	Impact	2-3	6-7	-1
4	Neeb	2-3	6-8	-2
5	Zest	1-4	3-8	-5
6	Nerchio	1-4	3-9	-6

Group D
P	Player	W-L	Map W-L	MD
1	Classic	5-0	10-1	+9
2	sOs	4-1	8-4	+4
3	Trap	3-2	6-6	0
4	Ryung	2-3	6-6	0
5	HeRoMaRinE	1-4	3-8	-5
6	Elazer	0-5	2-10	-8

=== Playoffs ===
First round
Trap	3
Dark	2
Dear	3
Impact	2
Hurricane	0
Rogue	3
sOs	2
Maru	3

Quarter-finals
Serral	3
Trap	2
Classic	3
Dear	1
TY	1
Rogue	3
Solar	1
Maru	3

Semi-finals
Serral	0
Classic	3
Rogue	3
Maru	2

Final
Classic	0
Rogue	4
