= Intel Extreme Masters Season XIII – World Championship =

2019 esports tournament

Intel Extreme Masters Season XIII – Katowice Major 2019
Tournament information
- Sport: Counter-Strike: Global Offensive
- Location: Katowice, Silesian Voivodeship, Poland
- Administrator: Valve; ESL
- Venue(s): ESL Arena; Katowice MCK; Spodek

Final positions
- Champions: Astralis
- 1st runners-up: ENCE eSports
- 2nd runners-up: MIBR; Natus Vincere
- MVP: Emil "Magisk" Reif

ESL One Katowice 2019
Tournament information
- Sport: Dota 2
- Location: Katowice, Silesian Voivodeship, Poland
- Administrator: Electronic Sports League
- Venue: Spodek

Final positions
- Champions: Team Secret
- 1st runners-up: Gambit Esports
- 2nd runners-up: OG

Intel Extreme Masters Season XIII – World Championship
Tournament information
- Sport: StarCraft II
- Location: Katowice, Silesian Voivodeship, Poland
- Administrator: Electronic Sports League
- Venue: Spodek

Final positions
- Champions: soO
- 1st runners-up: Stats
- 2nd runners-up: Dark herO

ESL Katowice Royale 2019
Tournament information
- Sport: Fortnite: Battle Royale
- Location: Katowice, Silesian Voivodeship, Poland
- Administrator: Electronic Sports League
- Venue: Spodek

The Intel Extreme Masters Season XIII – World Championship or IEM Katowice 2019 was the world championship for the thirteenth season of the Intel Extreme Masters. It was held at the Spodek in Katowice, Silesian Voivodeship, Poland from February 13–March 3, 2019. The event featured tournaments for Counter-Strike: Global Offensive, Dota 2, StarCraft II, and Fortnite: Battle Royale. In addition, the Counter-Strike tournament was the game's fourteenth Major Championship.

== Counter-Strike: Global Offensive ==
Valve awarded ESL a Counter-Strike: Global Offensive Major Championship for the first time in nearly two and a half years. This tournament featured twenty-four teams from around the world, fourteen of which were directly invited from their top fourteen placements from the last Major and another ten teams qualifying from their respective regional qualifiers.

=== Major Playoffs ===
Quarterfinals
3	Natus Vincere	2
6	FaZe Clan	0
2	Team Liquid	0
7	ENCE eSports	2
4	MIBR	2
5	Renegades	0
1	Astralis	2
8	Ninjas in Pyjamas	0

Semifinals
3	Natus Vincere	1
7	ENCE eSports	2
4	MIBR	0
1	Astralis	2

Finals
7	ENCE eSports	0
1	Astralis	2

=== Intel Challenge ===
This tournament also featured the Intel Challenge Katowice 2019, an eight team tournament consisted of female teams.

==== Group stage ====
Group A

Pos	Team	W	L	RF	RA	RD
1	Assassins	2	0	32	18	+14
2	Dignitas Female	2	1	59	31	+28
3	paiN Girls	1	2	60	86	-26
4	Orgless Female	0	2	46	62	-16

Group B

Pos	Team	W	L	RF	RA	RD
1	Beşiktaş Esports	2	0	32	21	+11
2	Counter Logic Gaming Red	2	1	57	42	+15
3	Crowns Female	1	2	58	69	-11
4	Carnage Esports Female	0	2	33	48	-29

==== Intel Challenge playoffs ====
Semifinals
A1	Assassins	1
B2	CLG Red	2
B1	Beşiktaş Esports	1
A2	Dignitas Female	2

Finals
B2	CLG Red	0
A2	Dignitas Female	2
Third place
A1	Assassins	1
B1	Beşiktaş Esports	2

== Dota 2 ==
Dota 2's tournament was called ESL One Katowice 2019 rather than IEM Katowice 2019 as ESL deemed it to be part of its Dota ESL One series.

=== Teams ===
==== Direct Invitees ====
- Alliance
- Chaos Esports Club
- Fnatic
- Forward Gaming
- Ninjas in Pyjamas
- OG
- Team Aster
- Team Secret

==== Qualifiers ====
- compLexity Gaming (North America)
- For The Dream (China)
- Gambit Esports (Europe)
- Mineski (Southeast Asia)

=== Group stage ===
==== Group A ====
Pos	Team	W-L	
1	Team Secret	9-1	Advance to upper bracket
2	Gambit Esports	7-3	Advance to upper bracket
3	OG	6-4	Advance to lower bracket
4	Mineski	4-6	Advance to lower bracket
5	Forward Gaming	3-7	Eliminated
6	For The Dream	1-9	Eliminated

Group A results

Results
	Secret	Gambit	FTD	OG	Forward	Mineski
Secret		2-0	2-0	1-1	2-0	2-0
Gambit	0-2		2-0	2-0	1-1	2-0
FTD	0-2	0-2		0-2	1-1	0-2
OG	1-1	0-2	2-0		1-1	2-0
Forward	0-2	1-1	1-1	1-1		0-2
Mineski	0-2	0-2	2-0	0-2	2-0	

==== Group B ====
Pos	Team	W-L	
1	Fnatic	8-2	Advance to upper bracket
2	Ninjas in Pyjamas	6-4	Advance to upper bracket
3	Chaos Esports Club	6-4	Advance to lower bracket
4	Team Aster	5-5	Advance to lower bracket
5	compLexity Gaming	3-7	Eliminated
6	Alliance	2-8	Eliminated

Group B results

Results
	NiP	coL	Fnatic	[A]	Chaos	Aster
NiP		1-1	1-1	2-0	1-1	1-1
coL	1-1		1-1	1-1	0-2	0-2
Fnatic	1-1	1-1		2-0	2-0	2-0
[A]	0-2	1-1	0-2		1-1	0-2
Chaos	1-1	2-0	0-2	1-1		2-0
Aster	1-1	2-0	0-2	2-0	0-2	

=== Playoffs ===
==== Upper bracket ====
Upper bracket semifinals
A1	Team Secret	2
B2	Ninjas in Pyjamas	0
B1	Fnatic	1
A2	Gambit Esports	2

Upper bracket finals
A1	Team Secret	2
A2	Gambit Esports	0

==== Lower bracket ====
Lower bracket round 1
A3	OG	2
B4	Team Aster	0
B3	Chaos Esports Club	1
A4	Mineski	2

Lower bracket round 2
B2	Ninjas in Pyjamas	1
A3	OG	2
B1	Fnatic	2
A4	Mineski	1

Lower bracket semifinals
A3	OG	2
B1	Fnatic	0

==== Top 3 ====
Lower bracket finals			Finals
			A1	Team Secret	3
A2	Gambit Esports	2	A2	Gambit Esports	0
A3	OG	0

== StarCraft II ==
=== Participants ===
Protoss (8)	Terran (7)	Zerg (9)
2018 WCS Global Finals (1)
-	-	Serral (ENCE eSports)
Server Qualifiers (11)
Neeb (Ting)	Bunny (Team Blacer)	Dark (The Gosu Crew)
Patience	INnoVation (Team Reprecocity)	Rogue (Green Wings)
Zest	Maru (Green Wings)	-
-	SpeCial (XTEN Esports)	-
-	TY (Splyce)	-
-	uThermal (Team Liquid)	-
Offline qualifiers (12)
Creator (Green Wings)	GuMiho (PSISTORM)	Lambo (QLASH)
Dear (Newbee)	-	Leenock
herO (TSGaming)	-	RaganaroK (PSISTORM)
Stats (Splyce)	-	Scarlett (Newbee)
Trap (Green Wings)	-	Solar (TSGaming)
-	-	soO (Chivo SC)

=== Group stage ===
Group A
P	Player	W-L	Map W-L	MD
1	Stats	5-0	10-2	+8
2	Zest	4-1	9-4	+5
3	herO	3-2	6-5	+1
4	SpeCial	2-3	6-7	-1
5	Patience	1-4	3-8	-5
6	Creator	0-5	2-10	-8

Group B
P	Player	W-L	Map W-L	MD
1	Dark	4-1	8-3	+5
2	Trap	3-2	6-5	+1
3	Neeb	3-2	6-6	0
4	Maru	2-3	6-6	0
5	Leenock	2-3	6-8	-1
6	Lambo	1-4	4-8	-4

Group C
P	Player	W-L	Map W-L	MD
1	Serral	4-1	9-5	+4
2	RagnaroK	3-2	8-5	+3
3	Solar	3-2	7-7	0
4	GuMiho	2-3	6-6	0
5	Rogue	2-3	5-7	-2
6	INnoVation	1-4	4-9	-5

Group D
P	Player	W-L	Map W-L	MD
1	Dear	4-1	8-2	+6
2	TY	3-2	6-6	0
3	soO	2-3	6-6	0
4	Bunny	2-3	6-7	-1
5	uThermal	2-3	5-7	-2
6	Scarlett	2-3	4-7	-3

=== Playoffs ===
First round
herO	3
Trap	0
Zest	0
soO	3
Neeb	3
RagnaroK	0
TY	0
Solar	3

Quarter-finals
Dear	0
herO	3
Serral	2
soO	3
Stats	3
Neeb	0
Dark	3
Solar	1

Semi-finals
herO	1
soO	3
Stats	3
Dark	1

Final
soO	4
Stats	2

== Fortnite: Battle Royale ==
=== Duos ===
- hrs - Chap
- 7ssk7 - Jamside
- Bizzle - Dmo
- Boyerxd - Crippa
- Domentos - Fwexy
- Hoopek - Sk1x
- Issa - Kamo
- Kinstaar - Hunter
- Magin - Juganza
- Mirwana - Inclyde
- Mitr0 - Khuna
- Motor - ErycTriceps
- Nate Hill - FunkBomb
- RazZzero0o - x8
- Saf - Zayt
- Sak0ner - Skram
- Skite - Vato
- Taiovsky - Nero
- Teeqzy - Mushway
- Tfue - Cloak
- TheVic - Blaxou
- Vivid - Poach
- ZexRow - Vinny1x
