= Spodek =

Multipurpose arena in Katowice, Poland

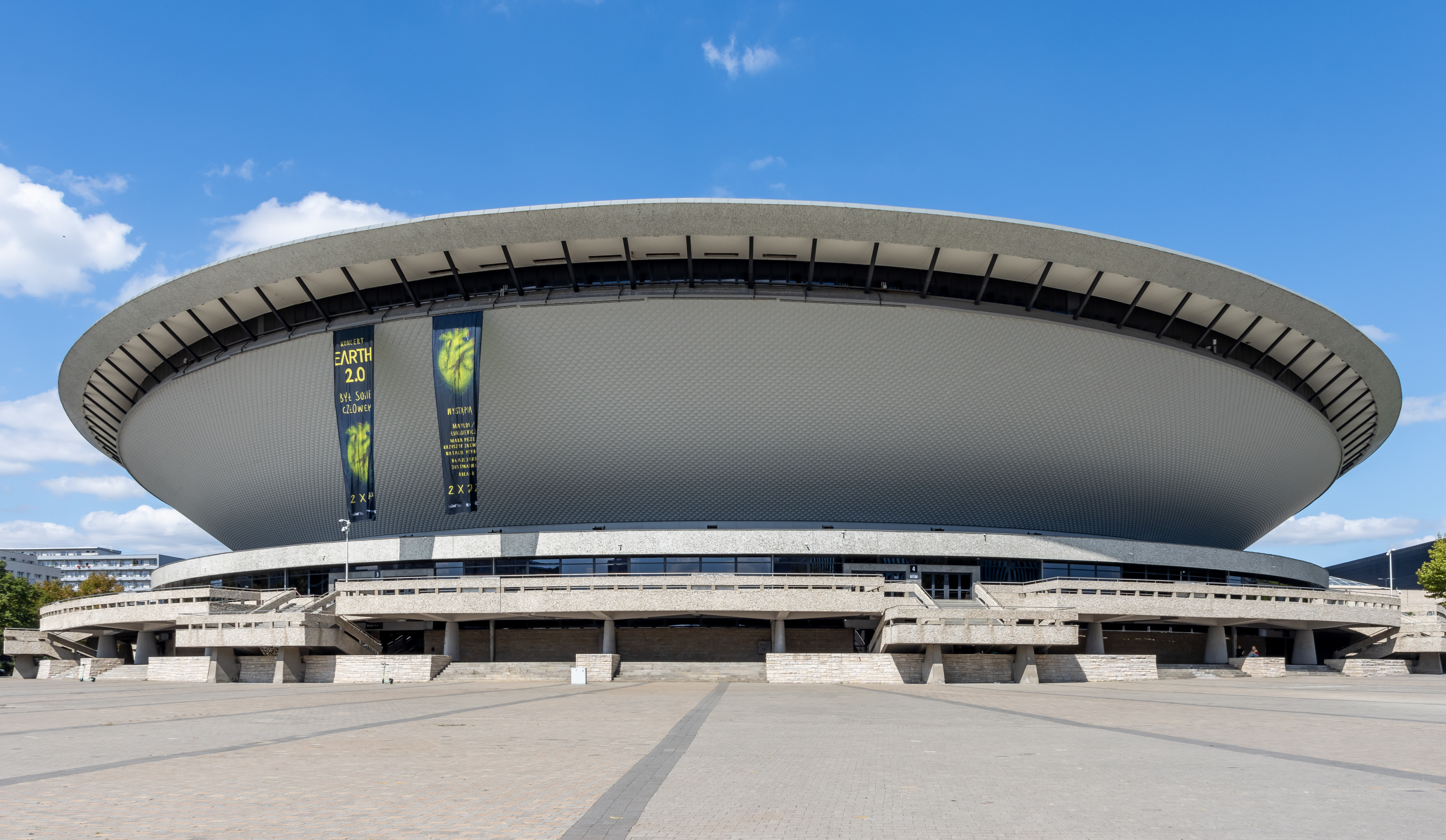
- The Spodek Arena in 2024
- Interactive map of Spodek
- Address: Aleja Korfantego 35, 40-005
- Location: Katowice, Poland
- Coordinates: 50°15′58″N 19°01′31″E
- Owner: City of Katowice
- Operator: PTWP Event Center sp. z o.o.
- Capacity: 11,036
- Surface: Versatile
- Acreage: 29 473 m^{2}
- Public transit: Katowice Spodek; Katowice Rondo

Construction
- Groundbreaking: 1964
- Built: 1964-1971
- Opened: 9 May 1971
- Renovated: 2011
- Expanded: 2009
- Cost: ~800 million zł
- Architects: Maciej Gintowt & Maciej Krasiński from Biuro Studiów i Projektów Typowych Budownictwa Przemysłowego (Warsaw)
- Structural engineer: Wacław Zalewski
- General contractor: Andrzej Żórawski

Website
- www.spodekkatowice.pl

Spodek is a multipurpose arena complex in Katowice, Poland, opened on 9 May 1971. Aside from the main dome, the complex includes a gym, an ice rink, a hotel and three large car parks. It was the largest indoor venue of its kind in Poland until it was surpassed by Tauron Arena in 2014.

The Spodek hosts many important cultural and business events. Music concerts are especially common non-sport events. It can hold around 11,500 people, although this number is in practice limited to 10,000 or even 8,000 due to stage set-ups obscuring the view.

The Polish word "spodek" translates to "saucer" in English, and also refers to a flying saucer since its iconic shape resembles a UFO. Spodek is a major contribution to the cultural significance of Katowice in Poland, especially for the younger generations. It has also been used as an unofficial logo for the city on posters promoting redevelopment in Katowice. Moreover, Spodek is home to ice hockey clubs in the winter months.

== History ==
The idea of building a large venue originated in 1955, while Katowice was temporarily renamed Stalinogród. A contest was held to select the best design. Initially, it was to be constructed on the outskirts of town, but the Voivodeship National Council decided it should be built near the city center. A mining waste dump site classified "2A" was chosen for construction.

The classification "2A" indicated medium mining damage with a possibility of local cave-ins. While excavating the foundations, the workers dug through coal instead of soil. Soon after construction began, rumors of design flaws in the new building spread, including the rumour that the dome would collapse when the scaffolding was removed. Because of this, in 1964, construction was halted for 18 months. Spodek's architects and chief engineers were present in the dome when the supports were dismantled as a statement against those rumors. Before opening the building to the public, as an endurance test, 3,500 soldiers marched throughout the hall; the vibration measurement was positive.

== Technology ==
Architects Maciej Gintowt and Maciej Krasiński designed the Spodek to employ the principle of tensegrity, as one of the first major structures to do so. For the roof they used an inclined surface held in check by a system of cables holding up its circumference.

The structural engineer who conceived the unique tensegrity roof and made it work was Wacław Zalewski. His innovative structures included Supersam, a supermarket in Warsaw with a roof made up of alternating arches and cables, many unique industrial roofs in Poland, two basketball arenas in Venezuela with hanging roofs, the structure of the National Museum of Art in Caracas, the Venezuelan Pavilion at the Seville's Expo in 1992, and several bridges and roofs in South Korea.

== Gallery ==
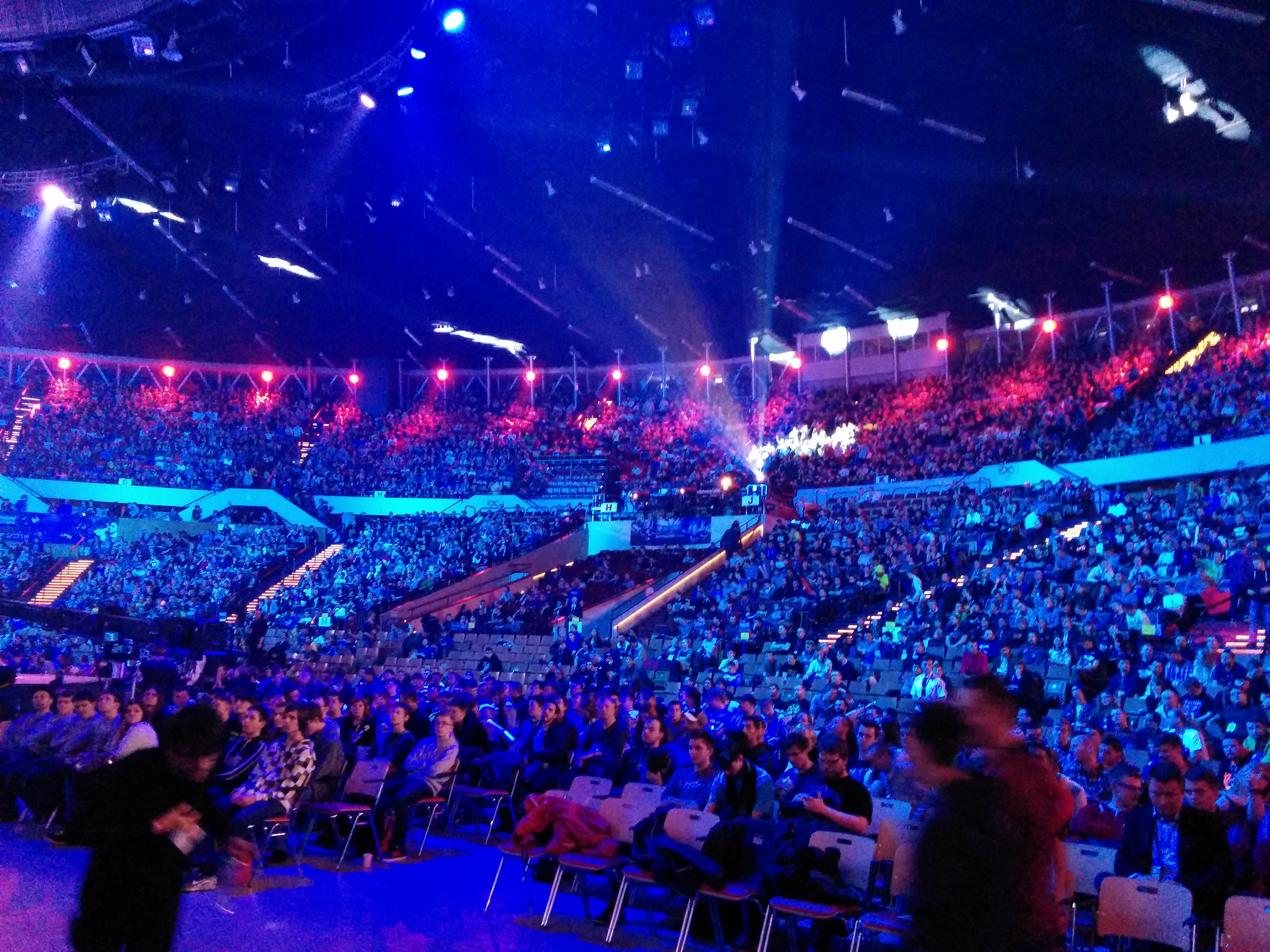
Spodek's interior during Intel Extreme Masters Katowice, 2015

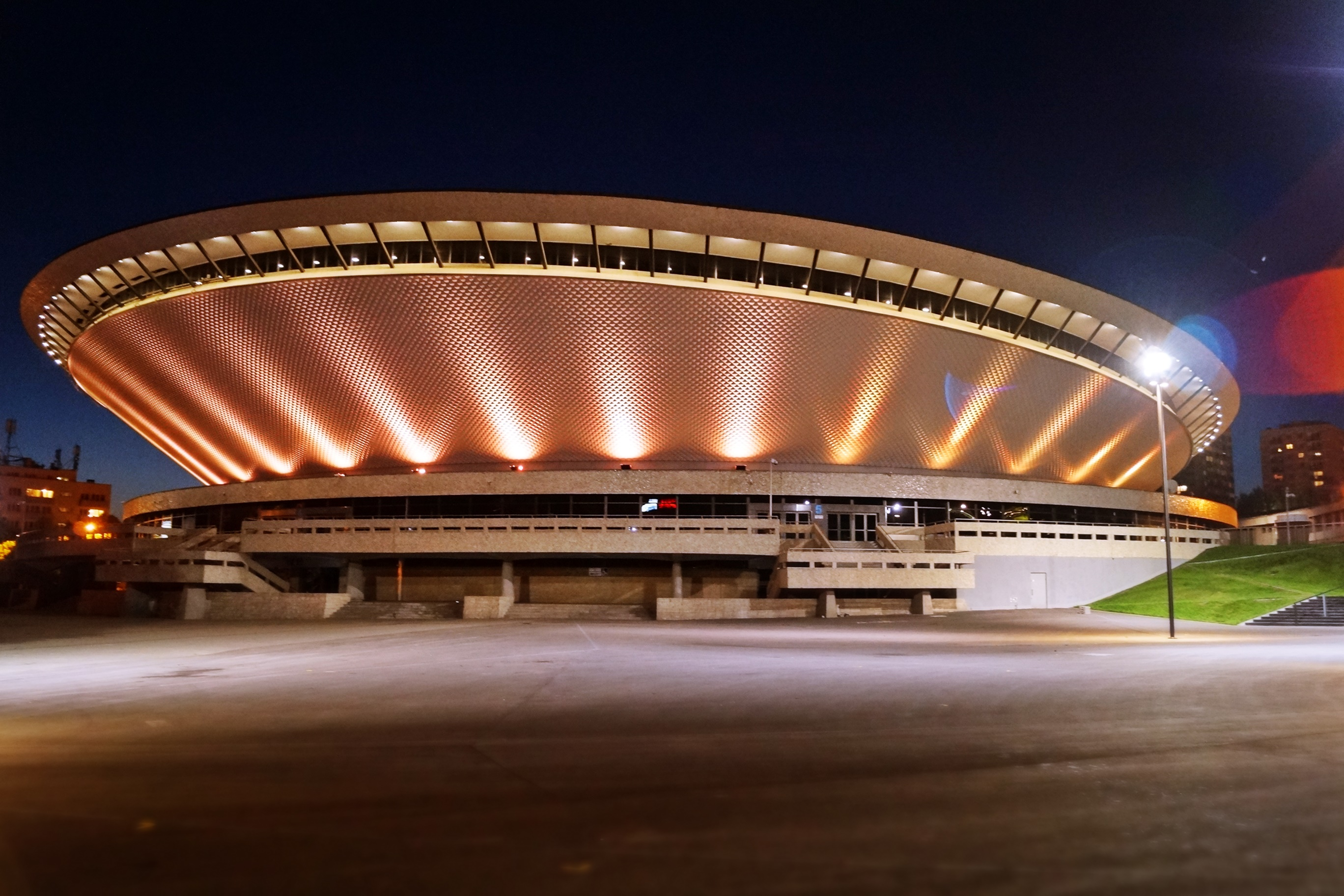
Night illumination of the façade, 2016

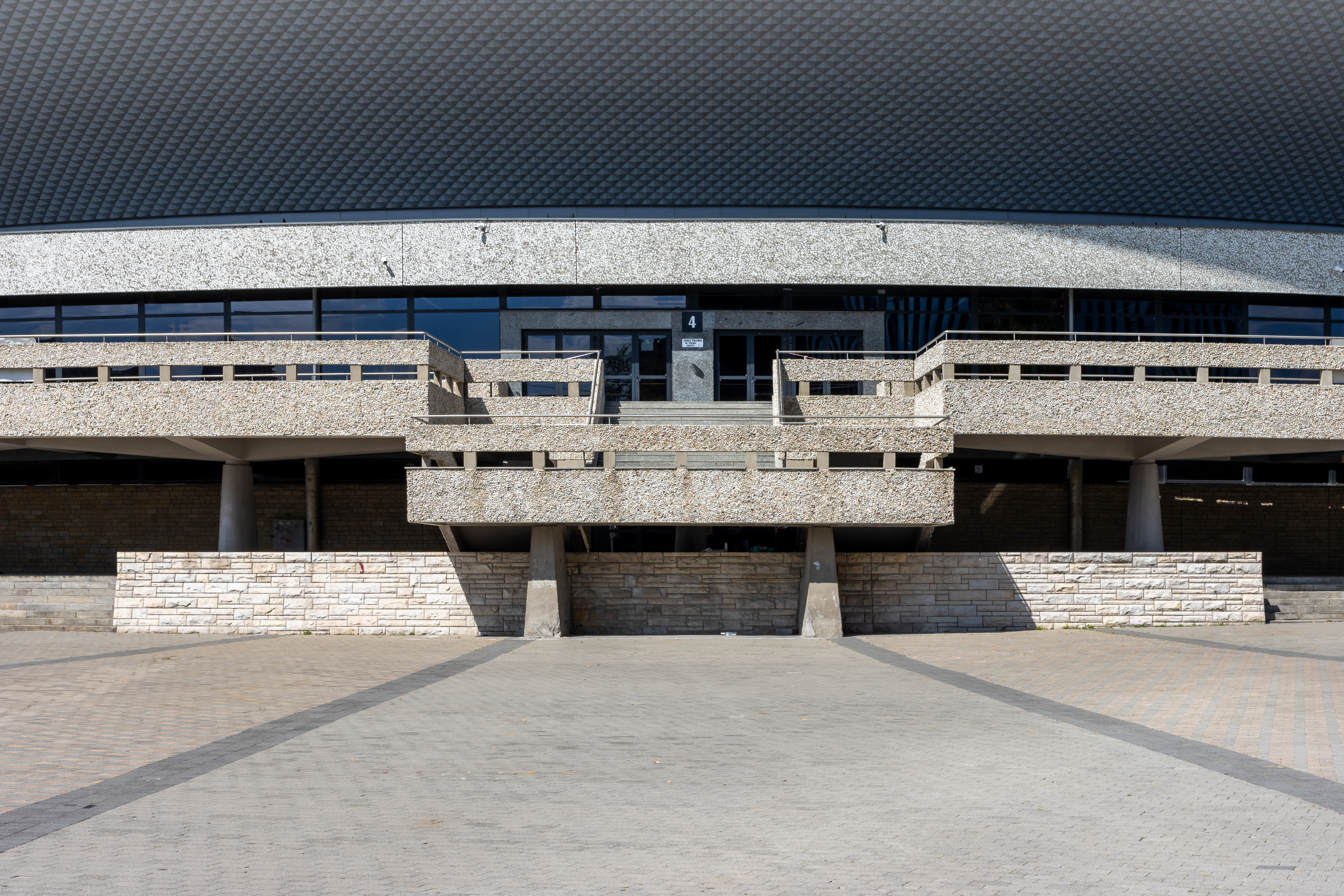
Entrance steps and terraces around Spodek

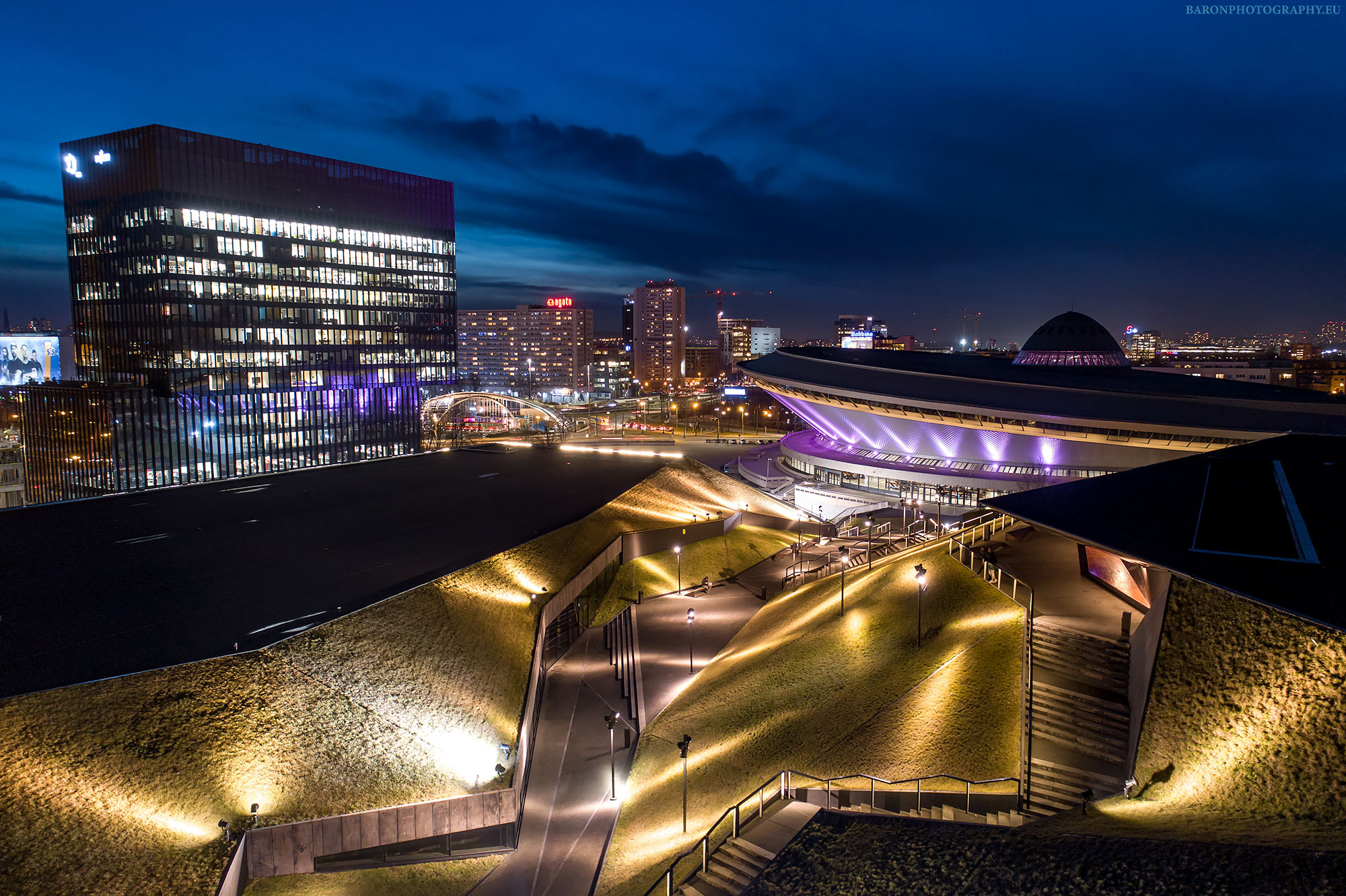
Spodek and the Katowice city centre at night, 2020

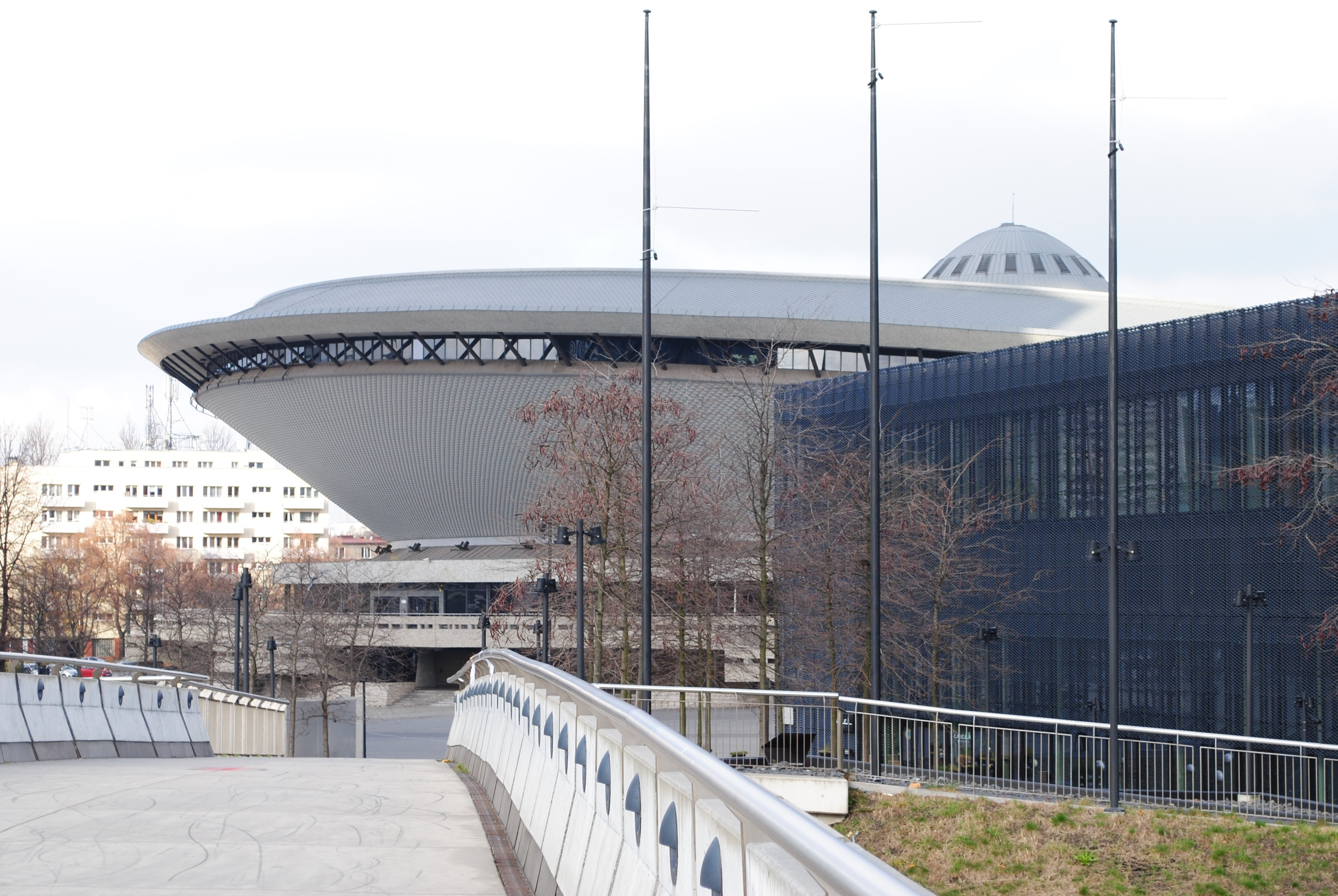
Spodek seen from NOSPR bridge, 2020

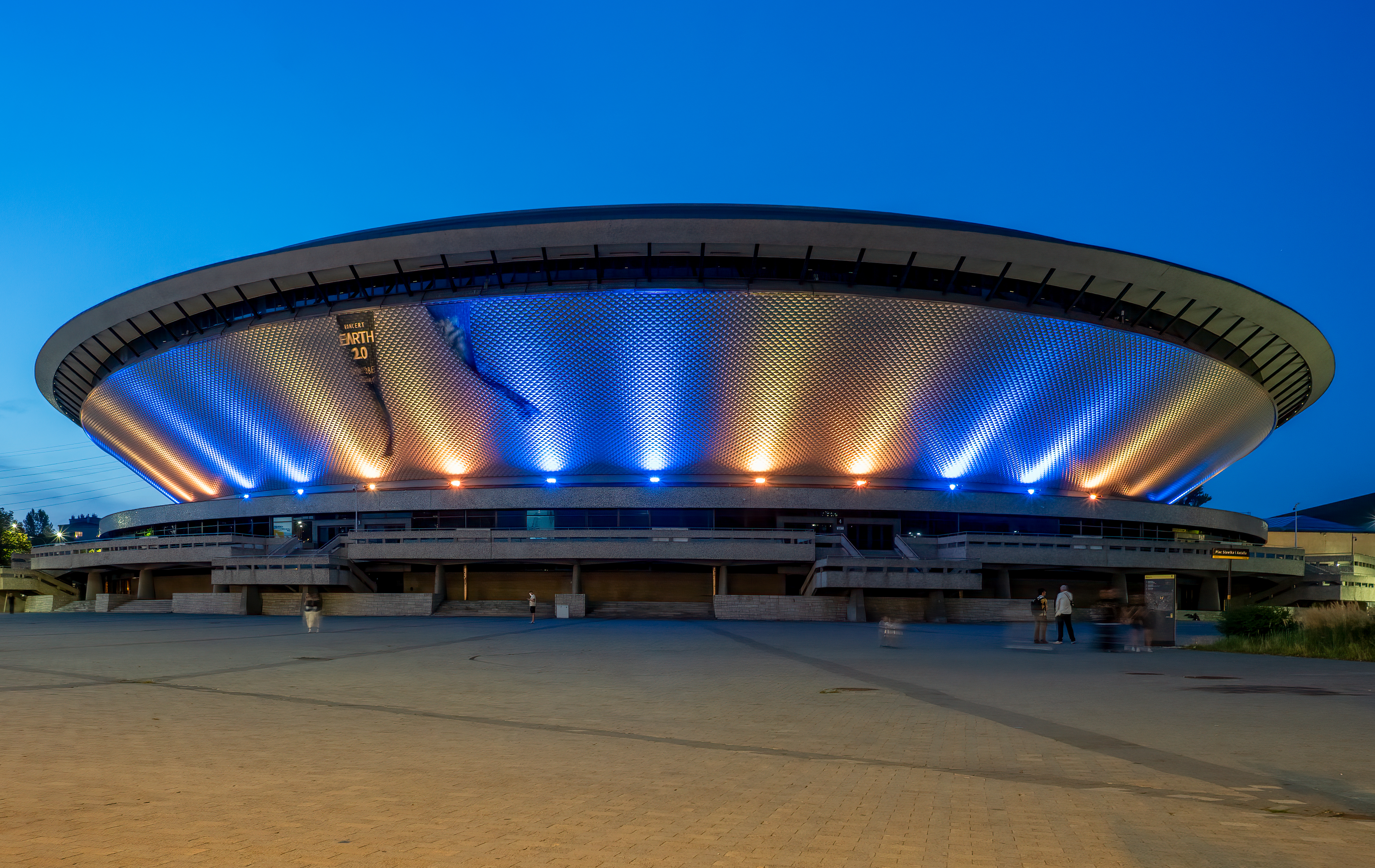
Spodek displaying the colors of the Ukrainian flag in 2024

== Hosted events ==
- Electronic Sports League tournaments, including the Intel Extreme Masters World Championships, from 2014 to 2025: EMS One Katowice 2014, ESL One Katowice 2015, IEM Season IX - Katowice, IEM Season X - Katowice, IEM Katowice 2017, IEM Katowice 2018, IEM Katowice 2019, IEM Katowice 2022, etc. Katowice 2014, 2015 and 2019 were also Counter-Strike Major Championships
- Blaze Bayley (of Iron Maiden and Wolfsbane) recorded his Alive in Poland DVD at Spodek in 2007
- Deep Purple recorded their Live Encounters DVD at Spodek in 1996
- Pearl Jam recorded their 6/15/00 – Katowice, Poland and 6/16/00 - Katowice, Poland albums at Spodek
- Smashing Pumpkins cover photo (inside) for the album Adore was taken in Katowice after a concert in Spodek
- The band Hey recorded their 1994 Hey Live! album at Spodek.
- The arena held the final rounds of the EuroBasket 2009.
- FIVB Volleyball World League Final Round 2001 & 2007
- EuroBasket Women 2011
- Intel Extreme Masters World Championship 2014
- 2014 FIVB Volleyball Men's World Championship
- Intel Extreme Masters World Championship 2015
- 2016 European Men's Handball Championship
- Intel Extreme Masters World Championship 2016
- 2016 IIHF World Championship Division IA
- Intel Extreme Masters World Championship 2017
- The WTA Tour BNP Paribas Katowice Open, a professional women's tennis tournament, was held at Spodek between 2013–2016
- Intel Extreme Masters World Championship 2018
- Intel Extreme Masters World Championship 2019 CS:GO Major
- 2019 BWF World Senior Championships
- Intel Extreme Masters World Championship 2020
- 2022 FIVB Volleyball Men's World Championship
- 2023 World Men's Handball Championship
- EuroBasket 2025
- 2026 European Women's Handball Championship
- Intel Extreme Masters Katowice 2024
- Intel Extreme Masters Katowice 2025
- ESL Pro League Season 24 Finals (2026)
- 2031 World Women's Handball Championship

== See also ==
- List of indoor arenas in Poland
- Supersam Warsaw
- Sport in Poland

Events and tenants
Preceded by Elmia; Jönköping, Dreamhack Winter 2013	Counter-Strike Major; Playoffs host venue 2014	Succeeded by Koelnmesse; Cologne, ESL One Cologne 2014
Preceded by Elmia; Jönköping, Dreamhack Winter 2014	Counter-Strike Major; Playoffs host venue 2015	Succeeded by Lanxess Arena; Cologne, ESL One Cologne 2015
Preceded by Wembley Arena; London, FACEIT Major: London 2018	Counter-Strike Major; Playoffs host venue 2019	Succeeded by Uber Arena; Berlin, StarLadder Major: Berlin 2019
Preceded by Scandinavium; Gothenburg	European Indoor Championships in Athletics; Venue; 1975	Succeeded by Olympiahalle; Munich
Preceded by Rotterdam Ahoy; Rotterdam	FIVB Volleyball World League; Final Venue; 2001	Succeeded by Mineirinho Arena; Belo Horizonte
Preceded by Luzhniki Small Sports Arena; Moscow	FIVB Volleyball World League; Final Venue; 2007	Succeeded by Ginásio do Maracanãzinho; Rio de Janeiro
Preceded by Palacio de Deportes de la CAM; Madrid	FIBA EuroBasket; Final Venue; 2009	Succeeded by Žalgiris Arena; Kaunas
Preceded by PalaLottomatica; Rome	FIVB Volleyball Men's World Championship; Final Venue; 2014	Succeeded by Pala Alpitour; Turin
Preceded by Pala Alpitour; Turin	FIVB Volleyball Men's World Championship; Final Venue; 2022	Succeeded by TBD
Preceded by Wiener Stadthalle; Vienna	European Women's Handball Championship; Final Venue; 2026	Succeeded by Telenor Arena; Oslo
Preceded by TBD; TBD	World Women's Handball Championship; Final Venue; 2031	Succeeded by TBD; TBD
