= 2018 StarCraft II World Championship Series =

Esports tournament

2018 StarCraft II World Championship Series Global Finals
- 2018

Tournament information
- Sport: StarCraft II
- Location: Anaheim, California
- Administrator: Blizzard Entertainment
- Venue(s): Anaheim Convention Center
- Purse: $700,000

Final positions
- Champion: Joona "Serral" Sotala
- Runner-up: Kim "Stats" Dae Yeob

The 2018 StarCraft II World Championship Series (WCS) is the 2018 edition of the StarCraft II World Championship Series, the top esports tournament circuit for StarCraft II. Featuring the top eight players from each WCS region, World Championship Series Korea and the World Championship Series Circuit, the Global Finals received greater coverage than most prior events when Finnish professional player Joona "Serral" Sotala became the first non-Korean world champion in the StarCraft series.

== Format ==
The 2018 StarCraft II World Championship Series was separated into two regions, WCS Circuit and WCS Korea. The former featured four large events with accompanying qualifiers under the WCS Challenger branding, while the latter featured three seasons of the long-running Global StarCraft II League (GSL) Code S with two smaller GSL Super Tournament events interspersed. Two shared World Championship Series Global events featured players from both regions prior to the Global Finals. All these events gave out WCS Circuit and/or WCS Korea points that determined the seeding of the Global Finals.

Following the introduction of the War Chest for the 2017 Global Finals, two events received War Chest crowdfunding in 2018, with $150,000 and $200,000 added to the prize pools of IEM Katowice and the WCS Global Finals, respectively.

=== Seeding ===
Eight players from each WCS region qualify to the event based on their WCS Points-based rankings. Winners of WCS Circuit stops, GSL Code S events, and IEM Katowice receive automatic qualification. The sixteen players are then seeded into four four-player groups for the first round based on their region-specific ranking. A draw is held for the quarterfinals bracket, with winners of each group facing second-place finishers of other groups.

== Results ==
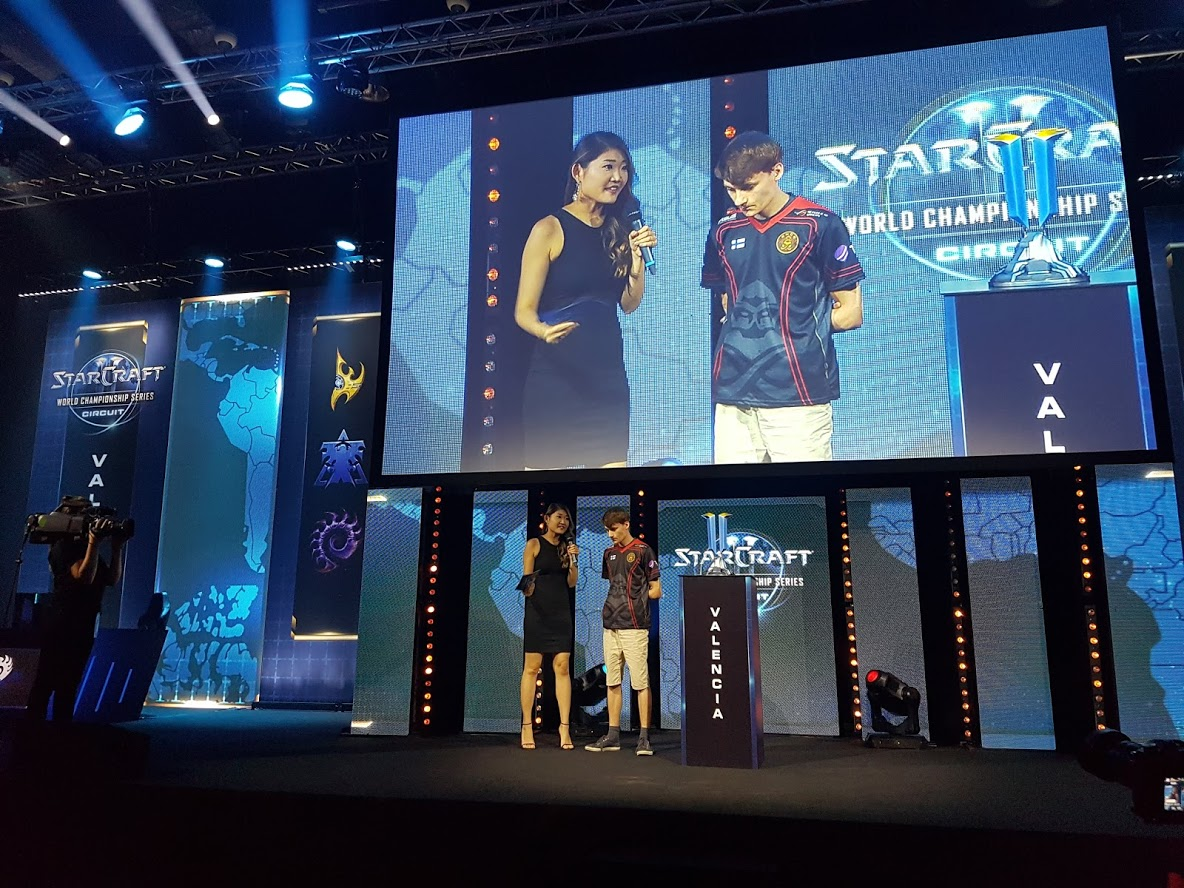
Joona "Serral" Sotala and Sue "Smix" Lee at 2018 WCS Valencia

For the first time in StarCraft II competition, both regions had all of their large events won by a single person. For WCS Circuit this was Joona "Serral" Sotala, who won all four stops and all related European Challenger events. For WCS Korea this was Cho "Maru" Seong Ju, who won all three GSL Code S seasons. WCS Global event IEM Katowice was won by the previous year's WCS champion, Lee "Rogue" Byung Ryul, with the other WCS Global event, GSL vs. the World, going to Joona "Serral" Sotala, marking the first non-Korean Global StarCraft II League champion.

=== Global Finals ===
The WCS Global Finals were held at the Anaheim Convention Center in Anaheim, California as part of BlizzCon 2018. They featured a group stage as the first round of play, played out the prior week as part of the BlizzCon Opening Week 2018, followed by bracket play from the quarterfinals onward at the convention center itself.

Quarterfinals		Semifinals		Finals
(South Korea) Maru	0
(South Korea) sOs	3	(South Korea) sOs	0
(Mexico) SpeCial	1	(South Korea) Stats	3
(South Korea) Stats	3			(South Korea) Stats	2
(South Korea) Rogue	3			(Finland) Serral	4
(South Korea) TY	2	(South Korea) Rogue	1
(South Korea) Dark	0	(Finland) Serral	3
(Finland) Serral	3
