= Wacław Zalewski =

Polish engineer

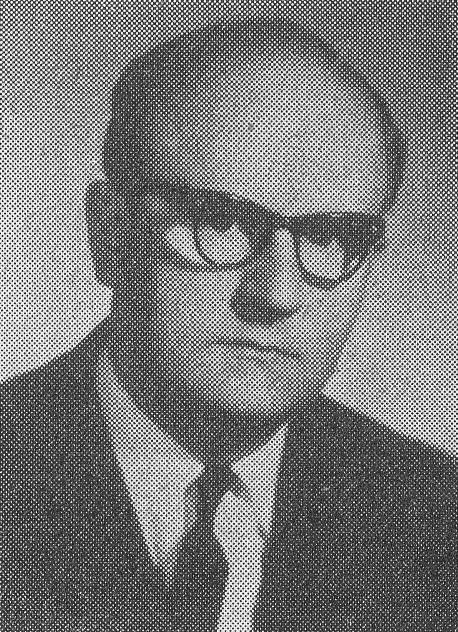
Wacław Zalewski

Wacław Piotr Zalewski (25 August 1917 – 29 December 2016) was a Polish construction engineer and designer, creator of innovative buildings such as "Spodek" in Katowice, "Supersam" in Warsaw from the roof of the structure funikularnej, or train station in Katowice. He was Professor Emeritus of Structural Design at the School of Architecture of MIT.

== Early life and education ==
Zalewski was born on 25 August 1917 to a Polish family settled in Samgorodek, Ukraine since the seventeenth century. He took part in the Warsaw Uprising of 1944 in Czerniaków. Went to Tadeusz Czacki High School in Warsaw, where he was in the same graduating class as the poet priest Jan Twardowski.

In 1947 he graduated from Warsaw University of Technology, which he began before the war, eventually graduating from the Gdańsk University of Technology.

== Career ==
He has designed a whole range of new industrial construction. He was repeatedly sent to foreign conferences during the communist era to "proclaim the Polish technical thought." In 1962 he earned a Ph.D. at the Technical University of Warsaw. His greatest achievement in Poland was working in the Office for the Study and Design of Industrial Building Types (BISTYP) in Warsaw until 1963.

In the years 1962 to 1966, he was in Venezuela at the Universidad de los Andes in Mérida, as a Visiting Professor, and later worked as a consultant for the Ministry of Public Works in Caracas. He designed a number of innovative structures, including buildings of hanging roofs and structures funikularne.

In 1965 he was invited as a full, tenured professor at the Massachusetts Institute of Technology (MIT), where he worked full-time until 1988, when he retired. Since that time, he has been a professor emeritus of architecture. He is considered one of the pioneers of the techniques of linear – rod on the principle of tensegrity structures in light canopies without the use of load-bearing columns. He wrote the book Shaping Structures with Ed Allen. Among others streams forces were introduced as a method for the calculation of the structure. He retained his connections in Venezuela for many years, however, and continued to design structures there during academic holidays and sabbaticals.

The exhibition "Shaping Structures" shown at MIT, supplemented by the Polish exhibits such as a model Supersam was also shown in Poland at the Technical University of Łódź, then in Warsaw in the Association of Polish Architects in Foksal, then Gdańsk University of Technology, and Wrocław University of Technology. A portion of the exhibit was also shown at Roger Williams University School of Architecture, Art and Historic Preservation in Bristol, Rhode Island, in Fall 2006.

In 1998, he received an honorary doctorate from Warsaw University of Technology from the Faculty of Architecture and the Faculty of Civil Engineering.

== Death ==
He died on 29 December 2016 at the age of 99.

== Projects ==
=== Architect/Engineer ===
- Department of Forest Engineering at the Universidad de los Andes (Mérida, Venezuela, 1965)

=== Structural Engineering ===
- Gimnasium Pedro Elias Belisario in Maracaibo (Venezuela, 1965)

=== Engineer ===
- Museum of Art in Caracas, Venezuela (1973)
- Keum Jung Sports Park in Pusan, Korea (2002)
- Spodek in Katowice, Poland (1972)
- Supersam supermarket in Warsaw, Poland (1960)
- Torwar Hall in Warsaw ( 1960)
- Venezuelan Pavilion at Expo 1992 in Seville (Spain) (1992)
- Factory in Mińsk Mazowiecki
- Furniture Factory in Las Vegas
- Monument of the Coast Defenders (Pomnik Obrońców Wybrzeża) in Gdańsk (1966) Monument in honor o the defenders of the Battle of Westerplatte

== Bibliography ==
- Shaping Structures, John Wiley & Sons, New York, ISBN 0471169684, 1998; pp. 416
- Shaping Structures: Statics Edward Allen, Waclaw Zalewski, ISBN 978-0471169680
- Buildings on Slopes, Massachusetts Institute of Technology, Cambridge, 1970
- A simplified procedure for torsional analysis of prismatic members with open section, Massachusetts Institute of Technology, Cambridge, 1971
- Form and Forces: Designing Efficient, Expressive Structures Edward Allen, Waclaw Zalewski ISBN 978-0-470-17465-4
