= Supersam =

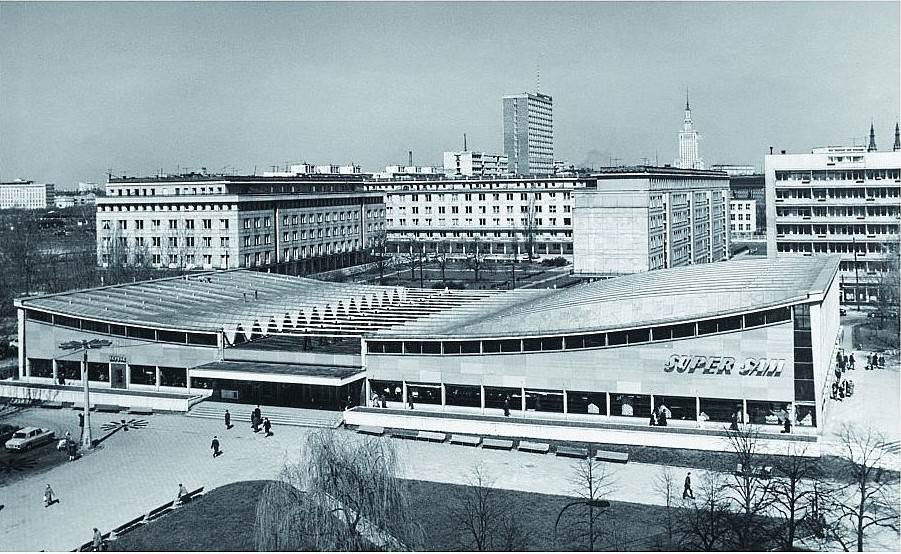
- Warsaw Supersam in 1969
- Interactive map of the Supersam area

General information
- Type: Supermarket
- Architectural style: Modernist
- Classification: Pavilion
- Location: Mokotowski Square, ul. Puławska 2, 02-566, Warsaw, Poland
- Coordinates: 52°12′46″N 21°01′12″E
- Completed: 6 June 1962
- Opened: 6 June 1962
- Closed: 2006
- Demolished: 2006

Height
- Roof: tensegrity-based

Technical details
- Floor area: 6000 m²

Design and construction
- Architects: Jerzy Hryniewiecki, Maciej Krasinski and Ewa Krasińska
- Engineer: Stanisław Kuś and Andrzej Żórawski
- Structural engineer: Wacław Zalewski

Supersam (also stylilised as SuperSam and Super Sam) was a modernist supermarket in Warsaw, at Mokotowski Square, built in 1962 and designed by Jerzy Hryniewiecki, Maciej Krasinski and Ewa Krasińska with structural engineer Wacław Zalewski. It was the first self-serve supermarket in the country, and was considered a primary example of modernist architecture in Poland. Supersam was demolished in 2006 and replaced by a new architectural complex built between 2013 and 2015.

== History ==
The Warsaw supermarket was built in 1962 at the Lublin Union Square (formerly also Mokotowski square,) on the site of the former Polish Radio building. Historically (1770–1818), this place was called Rondo Mokotowskie and standing here was the Southern Gate to the city. The supermarket building was an innovative design with a roof on the principle of tensegrity suspended and kept in place by steel girders and cables, designed by three architects: Professor Jerzy Hryniewiecki, Maciej Krasinski, Maciej Gintowt and three engineers: Waclaw Zalewski, a professor emeritus of MIT, Professor Stanislaw Kusia and Andrzej Żórawski.

Although a campaign was carried out to save the building from destruction as an architectural monument valuable PRL and unique construction design for its time, Supersam was demolished in December 2006.

== Architecture and technology ==
A hanging roof was desired from the beginning, but this would require sloping roof mainstays that would take up valuable real estate and would make the building structure vulnerable to catastrophic failure due to accidents or vandalism. Through progressive designs, a method was developed, by structural engineer Wacław Zalewski, employing the principle of tensegrity, to eliminate the backstays by alternating cables and arches of similar curvature. The outward thrust of arches at their highest points exactly balances the inward pull of the cables at each end. This whole structure was supported vertically by columns.

As the building aged, and further demands were placed on the roof structure, the building had to eventually be demolished reportedly because it was unsafe, according to the building owner, but this is a disputed fact.

== Lublin Union Square ==
In 2009, a new Supersam was opened in a new location in Katowice the corner of Domaniewska and Puławska, led by the Cooperative Warszawska Spółdzielnia Spożywców Supersam who served the previous building. This hall is to be temporary until the hill by the developer 90-meter triangular office building surrounded by a mall on the site of the former Supersam.

In the years 2010–2013 in the place where the former Supersam existed, a new office building and commercial space at Lublin Union Square called the "Plac Unii" (Union Square). 12 October 2013 a new "Supersam" was built. The buildings will house a 15,000 square meter shopping mall and 41,000 m2 of class A+ office space. The total area of the building, including the underground levels, will exceed 100,000 square meters. The complex foundation will feature four underground floors. The three lowest floors will serve as a parking lot for 800 cars. Whereas, the floor just below ground level will host a delicatessen operated by merchants of the Supersam Grocers Cooperative, after years, making their come-back to the Lublin Union Square.
