= Serral =

Finnish esports player

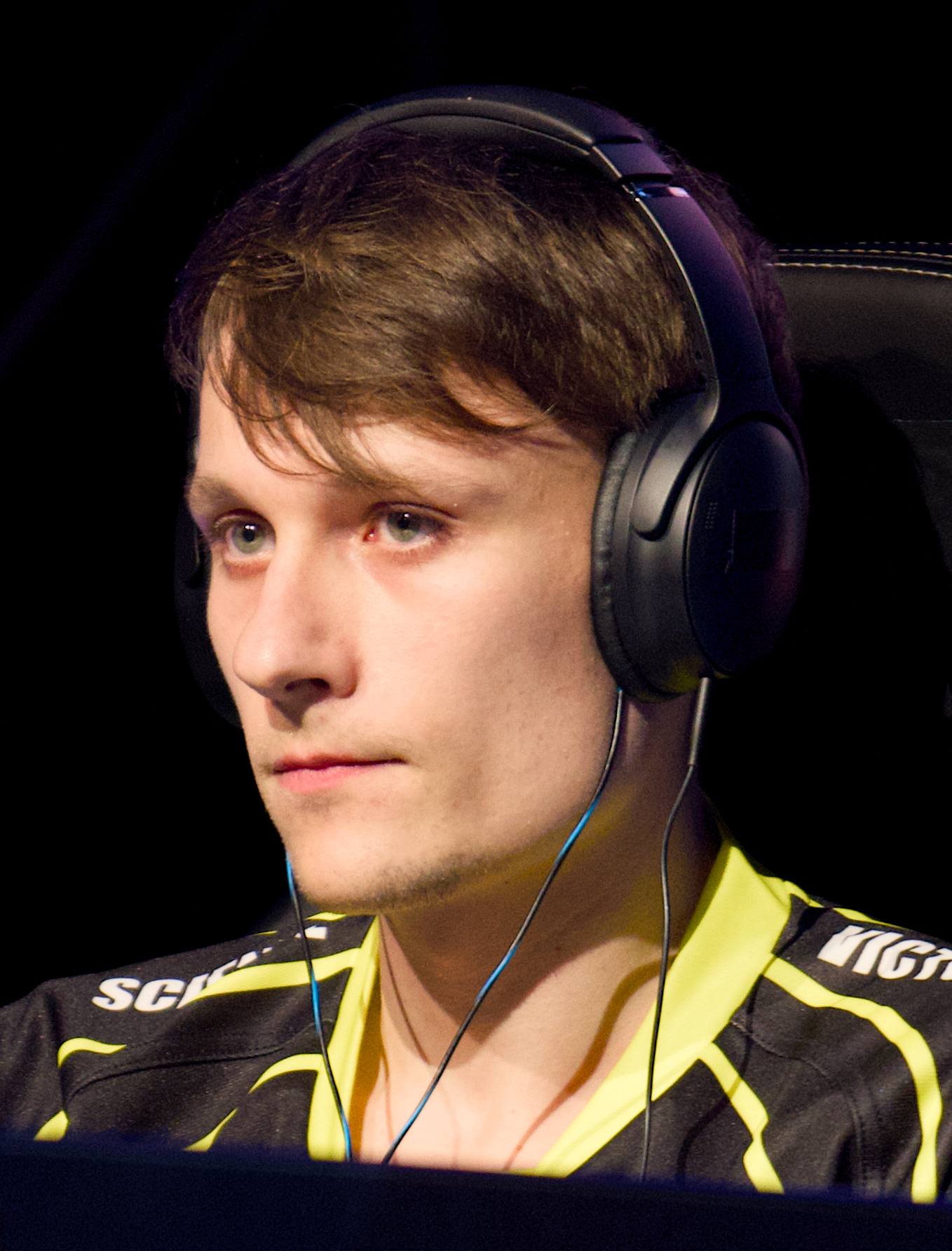
- Serral at ESL StarCraft 2 Masters 2023 Winter

Personal information
- Name: Joona Sotala
- Nicknames: The Night King; The Finnish Phenom; The Finnisher
- Born: 22 March 1998 (age 28); Pornainen, Finland
- Nationality: Finnish

Current team
- Team: BASILISK
- Game: StarCraft II

Career information
- Playing career: 2012–present

Team history
- 2012: eXelon Gaming
- 2013–2014: ENCE eSports
- 2014–2016: mYinsanity
- 2016–2023: ENCE
- 2023–present: BASILISK

Career highlights and awards
- WCS champion (2018); 2× IEM champion (2022 Katowice, 2024 Katowice); EWC champion (2025 Riyadh)

Joona Sotala (born 22 March 1998), better known as Serral, is a Finnish professional StarCraft II player using the race Zerg.

In 2018, Serral became the first non-Korean player to win the StarCraft II World Championship Series (WCS). He won every major non-Korean tournament in 2018, the 2018 Global StarCraft II League (GSL) vs. the World event and, ultimately, the 2018 WCS Global Finals.

Serral is a three-time world champion of StarCraft II, having claimed his first championship title at the BlizzCon in 2018, and repeating the feat again in 2022 with an updated championship format. He won a third championship title at Esports World Cup 2025. As a result, many consider Serral to be one of the greatest StarCraft II players of all time.

== StarCraft II career ==
=== Early career ===
Serral started competing at StarCraft II in 2012, but did not initially make a big splash. His first major tournament win would come in 2017 with the World Championship Series (WCS) Jönköping European Qualifier win, beating Zanster, Mana, ShoWTimE, Namshar and Elazer. He took second place in the main event after beating Stephano, PtitDrogo and Elazer, but lost 3–4 to Neeb in the Finals. In 2017, he also won the European Qualifier for WCS Valencia, taking out Stephano, Bly, HeRoMaRinE and Elazer twice. During the main event, he was knocked out in the quarter-finals by TRUE.

Serral won the European Qualifier for World Electronic Sports Games (WESG) by beating Clem, NightEnD, Starbuck, Majestic, uThermal, Elazer and Nerchio. In the main event, he did not lose a map during group play, beating ShoWTimE, Minato, Has, Elazer, Bly and Lambo. During playoffs, he beat Neeb in the quarterfinals, but lost 0–3 to the eventual champion Maru.

=== 2018: First Grand Slam in WCS history ===
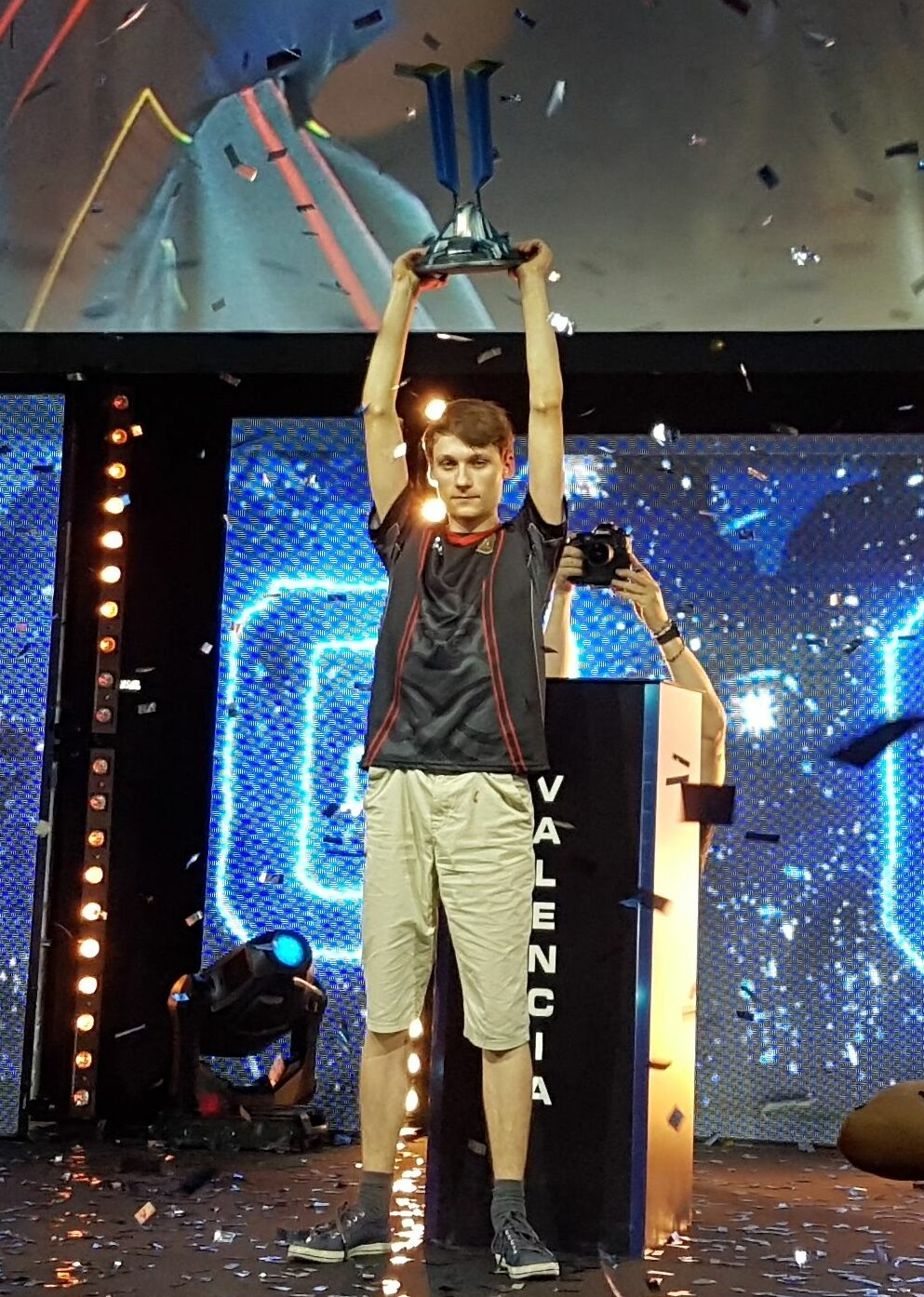
Serral lifting the 2018 WCS Valencia trophy

His first premier tournament win came in 2018 when he won WCS Leipzig, beating MaSa, Nerchio, SpeCial and ShoWTimE. He went on to win all 3 other major WCS tournaments in 2018, getting the first clean sweep, or Grand Slam, in WCS history. In WCS Austin, he defeated Kelazhur, HeRoMaRinE, Lambo and MaNa. In WCS Valencia, he beat Scarlett, Reynor, HeRoMaRinE and Has. In WCS Montreal, his domination of the 2018 WCS circuit was underscored by beating JonSnow, Scarlett, Lambo and Reynor. Serral also showed his prowess in the Korean scene at the 2018 Global StarCraft II League (GSL) vs. the World tournament where he took home a $26,901 prize over several of the strongest Korean players, beating Kelazhur, INnoVation, Dark and Stats.

The year end WCS Global Finals at Blizzcon featured 2018's eight best non-Koreans and eight best Koreans, including Cho "Maru" Seong Ju, who qualified for the Global Finals by making a clean sweep of GSL. Serral would win this tournament beating sOs, Zest, Dark, Rogue and Stats to become the first non-Korean to do so in the history of the StarCraft franchise.

=== 2019 ===
To start off the year 2019, Serral competed in the WCS Winter Europe Tournament, where he was expected to win. However, he was defeated 4–3 by 16-year-old Italian Zerg player, Reynor, in the Grand Finals in an incredibly close series. A month prior, he was also defeated by INnoVation in the WESG Finals. Not to mention, earlier that week he was eliminated in the Round of 8 of IEM Katowice to soO, the eventual winner of the tournament. After not losing a tournament in 2018, then falling short of victory in his first three tournaments of 2019, many started to question his dominance over the scene.

After the conclusion of WCS Winter, the Challengers for WCS Spring quickly started where Serral easily won, defeating ShoWTimE in the finals 4–2. During the main tournament, Serral quickly advanced to the playoff round. He defeated Lambo and TIME to advance to the semifinals. In the semifinal, he swept Reynor 3–0 to advance into the Grand Final—as a revenge for WCS Winter. In the Grand Final, Serral won 4–0 versus the Mexican Terran player SpeCial. His victory in WCS Spring was his Fifth WCS Circuit title.

However, he lost again to Reynor in the WCS Summer Grand Final 4–2. In his home tournament in Finland, Asus ROG Assembly 2019, he was projected to be one of the favorites to win the tournament, but lost to the strong Korean Protoss player Stats 2–3 in semifinals. Later during the summer, he won the GSL vs. the World tournament on Korean soil by defeating another Zerg player, Elazer, in the finals 4–2. The first time in the history no Korean players appeared in the final match. The win was Serral's second consecutive in the tournament. Serral won the last 2019 WCS Fall circuit tournament at Montreal against Reynor 4–1, and broke the previous WCS record by achieving an unprecedented map score of 17–1 - with his only map loss in the finals. Serral won the WCS season with 10,200 points, having already earned the top seed in Blizzcon 2019 with tournament victories in WCS Spring and WCS Fall tournaments. Despite being one of the main favorites to win The Blizzcon 2019 he lost the semifinal match against his season long rival Reynor 2–3, the eventual tournament runner-up, after tight series of best of 5.

In the season's last premier tournament HomeStory Cup XX held at Tropical Islands Resort in Germany, Serral came back to the winning ways defeating Reynor twice (2–1 and 3–2) in the finals after winning the double-elimination loser bracket final against Innovation 0–3, to which he was first relegated from winners' round 2 by him with map score 3–1.

Serral played a crucial role in the Nationwars 2019 tournament when Team Finland (ZhuGeLiang, Serral, TheMusZero) defeated Team Korea in the final match 5–3.

For recognition and honor of Serral's accomplishments and continued success in StarCraft II esports, the President of Finland Sauli Niinistö invited him to take part to the traditional Independence Day Reception in the Presidential Palace, Helsinki, 6 December 2019.

=== 2020 ===
Serral started off the year with a 4th-place finish at IEM Katowice 2020, losing 2–3 to Zest after a convincing 3–1 victory over INnoVation, something he would follow up by winning the first StayAtHome Story Cup, an online replacement for the HomeStory Cup, winning the finals against INnoVation 4–1. After a 13th-place finish he won the 2nd StayAtHome Story Cup, this time against Solar 3–2.

Serral carried on winning small online tournaments as many events got cancelled in the face of COVID-19. Notable performances for the rest of 2020 included a 2nd-place finish in the Douyu Cup, losing the finals to Reynor, a 2nd-place finish in the Warchest Team League where he played with Special, Armani and Dream on team War Pigs. He mentioned in an interview with RedBull's Ben Sillis that he had started playing golf to take his mind of StarCraft, he explained that "Golf fills the role of doing something else than playing StarCraft really well".

After a 1st-place finish against Stats in the season finals of DH SC2 Masters 2020 Winter Serral ended the year in a face off against Dark in the TSL6 finals which he lost 0–4.

=== 2022: First world championship title ===
Serral faced former Italian world champion Reynor in the IEM Katowice Finals and beat him 4–3.

=== 2023 ===
Serral faced GuMiho in the ESL Masters Summer 2023 Finals and beat him 4–2. 2023 would also be the year where Serral left his long time team ENCE for BASILISK.

Serral faced Cure in the finals of Master's Coliseum 6 and beat him 4–1.

On 19 November 2023, Serral won the Grand Final of the ESL SC2 Masters 2023 Winter: Europe, beating Clem 4–1. As such, he has earned a direct spot at IEM Katowice 2024. The Winter Regionals Champion for Europe receives an IEM invite, according to ESL's slots distribution rules.

Serral faced Clem in the finals of HomeStory Cup XXIV and beat him 3–1, becoming the first person to ever win 5 homestory cups.

He gave an interview for the YouTube channel Starcraft Historian, where he discussed his career and the StarCraft scene in general.

At the end of the year, Serral competed in the ESL SC2 Masters: Winter 2023 Finals, at DreamHack Atlanta, where he stopped in the semifinals, losing to Clem 3–1.

=== 2024: Second world championship title ===
At the start of the year, Serral competed in Master's Coliseum 7. As of 25 January 2024, he has made it to the upper bracket finals and won against his teammate, Reynor, 4–0. In the grand finals of Master's Coliseum 7, in a best of 9, Serral competed against Hero and beat him 5–1.

In February 2024, Serral reached the Grand Final of IEM Katowice 2024 and won 4–0 against Maru. This was considered the most dominant championship performance ever, with Serral lifting his second title on the back of a 20-1 combined map score and a clean sweep of 8–0 in matches.

Serral has already qualified for the Esports World Cup 2024 in Riyadh by winning SC2 Masters Summer back in 2023. Even if he had not won this competition, he would have still qualified by winning IEM Katowice 2024 on 11 February. Thus, due to Serral winning two slots for Esports World Cup 2024, the player with the highest EPT Global Standings rank will gain the spot instead.

On 2 June 2024, Serral reached the Grand Final of ESL SC2 Masters: Spring and won 4–0 against Maru.

Preceded by Lee "Rogue" Byung Ryul	StarCraft II World Championship Series Winner; 2018	Succeeded by Park "Dark" Ryung Woo
Preceded by Riccardo "Reynor" Romiti	Intel Extreme Masters Katowice; 2022	Succeeded by Incumbent
